= Electoral results for the Australian Senate in Tasmania =

This is a list of electoral results for the Australian Senate in Tasmania since Federation in 1901.

== Election results ==
=== Elections in the 2020s ===
==== 2025 ====
The Tasmanian senators whose terms expire due to this election are as follows:

- Jacqui Lambie (JLN)
- The Hon Richard Colbeck (LP)
- The Hon Carol Brown (ALP)
- Catryna Bilyk (ALP)
- Nick McKim (GRN)
- Claire Chandler (LP)

2025 Australian federal election: Senate, Tasmania
Party	Candidate	Votes	%	±%
Quota		48,720		
Labor	1. Carol Brown (elected 1); 2. Richard Dowling (elected 4); 3. Bailey Falls; 4. Saxon O'Donnell; 5. Greg Luckman; 6. Amelia Louise Meyers	121,276	35.56	+8.52
Liberal	1. Claire Chandler (elected 2); 2. Richard Colbeck; 3. Jacki Martin	80,567	23.62	–8.40
Greens	1. Nick McKim (elected 3); 2. Vanessa Bleyer; 3. Scott Jordan; 4. Trenton Hoare	55,228	16.19	+0.71
Lambie	1. Jacqui Lambie; 2. Christine Hannan	25,171	7.25	−1.42
One Nation	1. Lee Hanson; 2. James Dunn	17,635	5.08	+1.20
Legalise Cannabis	1. Matt Owen; 2. Gail Hester	11,286	3.31	+0.28
Trumpet of Patriots	1. Wayne Leslie Moore; 2. Matt Kelly; 3. Greg Smith	11,180	3.22	+3.05
Shooters, Fishers, Farmers	1. Phillip Bigg; 2. Melanie Roach	7,855	2.26	+0.36
Animal Justice	1. Casey Davies; 2. Kate Elizabeth Lucas	4,495	1.32	−0.05
Sustainable Australia	1. Dennis Bilic; 2. Pierre Richardson	4,147	1.19	+0.22
Libertarian	1. Chrysten Abraham; 2. Nicole Armstrong	1,529	0.44	+0.44
Citizens	1. Daryl Staggard; 2. Ray Williams	1,172	0.34	+0.34
Ungrouped	Fenella Edwards	811	0.24	+0.01
Total formal votes		341,034	95.50	−1.30
Informal votes		16,072	4.50	+1.30
Turnout		357,106	86.74	−6.07

Results are not final. Last updated on 13 May 2025 at 6:50 PM AEST.

==== 2022 ====
2022 Australian federal election: Senate, Tasmania
Party	Candidate	Votes	%	±%
Quota		51,579		
Liberal	1. Jonathon Duniam (elected 1); 2. Wendy Askew (elected 5); 3. Eric Abetz	115,594	32.02	+0.56
Labor	1. Anne Urquhart (elected 2); 2. Helen Polley (elected 4); 3. Kate Rainbird; 4. Daniel Hulme; 5. Wayne Roberts; 6. Chris Gourlay	97,614	27.04	–3.55
Greens	1. Peter Whish-Wilson (elected 3); 2. Vanessa Bleyer; 3. Tabatha Badger	55,899	15.48	+2.91
Lambie	1. Tammy Tyrrell (elected 6); 2. Sarah Groat; 3. Tom Lambie	31,203	8.64	–0.28
One Nation	1. Steve Mav; 2. Norelle Button	14,013	3.88	+0.43
Legalise Cannabis	1. Matt Owen; 2. Oliver Fitzgibbon	10,942	3.03	+1.85
Liberal Democrats	1. Topher Field; 2. Chris Croft	6,913	1.91	+1.23
Shooters, Fishers, Farmers	1. Ray Williams; 2. Carlo Di Falco; 3. Brenton Jones	6,844	1.90	+0.16
United Australia	1. Diana Adams; 2. Alan Hennessy	5,862	1.62	–1.02
Local	1. Leanne Minshull; 2. Linda Poulton; 3. Lara Van Raay	5,216	1.44	+1.44
Animal Justice	1. Ivan Davis; 2. Virginia Thomas-Wurth	4,938	1.37	+0.09
Sustainable Australia	1. Todd Dudley; 2. Daria Lockwood	3,457	0.96	+0.45
Informed Medical Options	1. Lynne Kershaw; 2. Matthew Pickering	1,099	0.30	+0.30
Federation	1. Ray Broomhall; 2. Justin Stringer	623	0.17	+0.17
Ungrouped	Steve Crothers; Fenella Edwards	831	0.23	–1.99
Total formal votes		361,048	96.80	+0.44
Informal votes		11,925	3.20	−0.44
Turnout		372,973	92.81	–1.87
Party total seats			Seats	±
Liberal			4	▼1
Labor			4	Steady
Greens			2	Steady
Lambie			2	▲1

#	Senator	Party
1	Jonathon Duniam	Liberal
2	Anne Urquhart	Labor
3	Peter Whish-Wilson	Greens
4	Helen Polley	Labor
5	Wendy Askew	Liberal
6	Tammy Tyrrell	Lambie

=== Elections in the 2010s ===
==== 2019 ====
2019 Australian federal election: Senate, Tasmania
Party	Candidate	Votes	%	±%
Quota		50,285		
Liberal	1. Richard Colbeck (elected 1); 2. Claire Chandler (elected 3); 3. Tanya Denison	110,730	31.46	−1.07
Labor	1. Carol Brown (elected 2); 2. Catryna Bilyk (elected 5); 3. John Short; 4. Lisa Singh; 5. Wayne Roberts; 6. Robert Flanagan	107,670	30.59	−3.00
Greens	1. Nick McKim (elected 4); 2. Helen Hutchinson; 3. Simone Marsh	44,236	12.57	+1.41
Lambie	1. Jacqui Lambie (elected 6); 2. Glynn Williams; 3. Chris Reynolds	31,383	8.92	+0.62
One Nation	1. Matthew Stephen; 2. Adam Lambert	12,159	3.45	+0.88
United Australia	1. Kevin Morgan; 2. David Williams; 3. Craig Gunnis	9,281	2.64	+2.64
Shooters, Fishers, Farmers	1. Rebecca Byfield; 2. Kim Swanson	6,133	1.74	+0.36
Animal Justice	1. Karen Bevis; 2. Isobel Turner	4,521	1.28	+0.58
HEMP	1. Alfred Informal; 2. Matt Owen	4,141	1.18	+1.18
National	1. Steve Martin; 2. Wendy Hilditch	4,041	1.15	+1.15
Conservatives	1. Justin Stringer; 2. Nigel Frame	3,822	1.09	+1.09
Group O	1. Craig Garland; 2. Mark Duncan	3,649	1.03	+1.03
Liberal Democrats	1. Clinton Mead; 2. Matthew Rabey	2,400	0.68	+0.19
Sustainable Australia	1. Todd Dudley; 2. Christopher Maclay	1,783	0.51	+0.51
Conservative National	1. Michael Jones; 2. Frank Falzon	1,528	0.43	+0.43
Citizens Electoral Council	1. Ray Williams; 2. Steve Kucina	329	0.09	+0.04
Ungrouped	Greg Beck; Steve Mav; Francis Flannery; Karen Street	4,182	1.19	+1.04
Total formal votes		351,988	96.36	−0.16
Informal votes		13,284	3.64	+0.16
Turnout		365,272	94.68	+0.59

Elected	#	Senator	Party
2019	1	Richard Colbeck	Liberal
2019	2	Carol Brown	Labor
2019	3	Claire Chandler	Liberal
2019	4	Nick McKim	Greens
2019	5	Catryna Bilyk	Labor
2019	6	Jacqui Lambie	Lambie
2016
2016	1	Eric Abetz	Liberal
2016	2	Anne Urquhart	Labor
2016	3	Jonathon Duniam	Liberal
2016	4	Peter Whish-Wilson	Greens
2016	5	Wendy Askew	Liberal
2016	6	Helen Polley	Labor

==== 2016 ====
2016 Australian federal election: Senate, Tasmania
Party	Candidate	Votes	%	±%
Quota		26,090		
Labor	1. Anne Urquhart (elected 2); 2. Helen Polley (elected 6); 3. Carol Brown (elected 8); 4. Catryna Bilyk (elected 11); 5. John Short; 6. Lisa Singh (elected 10) (Note: In 2016, Lisa Singh was demoted to sixth position on the Labor Party's Tasmanian Senate ticket behind Senator Catryna Bilyk and union secretary John Short. A quota in Tasmania was 26,090 votes with Singh receiving 20,741 below-the-line votes: enough to overturn the party’s ticket order. She was the 10th senator elected for Tasmania, ahead of Catryna Bilyk (elected 11th), with John Short missing out.)	113,935	33.59	+0.76
Liberal	1. Eric Abetz (elected 1); 2. Stephen Parry (elected 5) (Note: Parry resigned on 1 November 2017 because he was a dual citizen of the United Kingdom. A special recount determined that Colbeck was elected instead.); 3. Jonathon Duniam (elected 7); 4. David Bushby (elected 9); 5. Richard Colbeck; 6. John Tucker	110,318	32.53	−4.98
Greens	1. Peter Whish-Wilson (elected 3); 2. Nick McKim (elected 12); 3. Anna Reynolds	37,840	11.16	−0.50
Lambie	1. Jacqui Lambie (elected 4) (Note: Lambie resigned on 14 November 2017 because she was a dual citizen of the United Kingdom. The Court of Disputed Returns declared she had been ineligible to be elected on 9 February 2018. A special recount determined that Martin was elected instead.); 2. Steve Martin; 3. Rob Waterman	28,146	8.30	+8.30
One Nation	1. Kate McCulloch; 2. Natasia Manzi	8,700	2.57	+2.57
Family First	1. Peter Madden; 2. Andrew Goelst; 3. Nick Cramp; 4. Mihi Ngawhare	6,692	1.97	+0.66
Xenophon	1. Michelle Hoult; 2. Nicky Cohen	5,128	1.51	+1.51
Shooters, Fishers, Farmers	1. Matthew Allen; 2. Ricky Midson	4,688	1.38	+0.28
Sex Party–HEMP joint ticket	1. Francesca Collins; 2. Matt Owen	4,493	1.32	+1.32
Christian Democrats	1. Silvana Nero-Nile; 2. Mishka Gora	2,861	0.84	+0.84
Animal Justice	1. Karen Bevis; 2. Alison Baker	2,377	0.70	+0.70
Recreational Fishers	1. Kevin Harkins; 2. Carmen Evans	2,376	0.70	+0.70
Palmer United	1. Kevin Morgan; 2. Justin Stringer; 3. Quentin Von Stieglitz	2,363	0.70	−5.88
Liberal Democrats	1. Clinton Mead; 2. Ian Alston	1,662	0.49	−1.83
Justice	1. Suzanne Cass; 2. Daniel Baker	1,473	0.43	+0.43
Renewable Energy	1. Rob Manson; 2. Sharon Joyce	1,340	0.40	+0.40
Science	1. Hans Willink; 2. Jin-oh Choi	1,306	0.39	+0.39
Liberty Alliance	1. Tony Robinson; 2. Susan Horwood	1,112	0.33	+0.33
VOTEFLUX.ORG	1. Adam Poulton; 2. Max Kaye	946	0.28	+0.28
Arts	1. Scott O'Hara; 2. JoAnne Volta	728	0.21	+0.21
Citizens Electoral Council	1. Meg Thornton; 2. Steve Kucina	177	0.05	+0.05
Ungrouped	David Crawford; Kaye Marskell; Richard Temby; Grant Russell; George Lane	498	0.15	+0.05
Total formal votes		339,159	96.52	−1.02
Informal votes		12,221	3.48	+1.02
Turnout		351,380	94.06	−1.02

#	Senator	Party
1	Eric Abetz	Liberal
2	Anne Urquhart	Labor
3	Peter Whish-Wilson	Greens
4	Jacqui Lambie	Lambie
5	Stephen Parry	Liberal
6	Helen Polley	Labor
7	Jonathon Duniam	Liberal
8	Carol Brown	Labor
9	David Bushby	Liberal
10	Lisa Singh	Labor
11	Catryna Bilyk	Labor
12	Nick McKim	Greens

==== 2013 ====
2013 Australian federal election: Senate, Tasmania
Party	Candidate	Votes	%	±%
Quota		48,137		
Liberal	1. Richard Colbeck (elected 1); 2. David Bushby (elected 3); 3. Sally Chandler; 4. Sarah Courtney	126,400	37.51	+4.54
Labor	1. Carol Brown (elected 2); 2. Catryna Bilyk (elected 4); 3. Lin Thorp; 4. John Dowling	110,617	32.83	−8.57
Greens	1. Peter Whish-Wilson (elected 5); 2. Helen Burnet; 3. Penelope Ann	39,284	11.66	−8.61
Palmer United	1. Jacqui Lambie (elected 6); 2. Kevin Deakin	22,184	6.58	+6.58
Liberal Democrats	1. Clinton Mead; 2. Katrina Lloyd	7,807	2.32	+2.32
Sex Party	1. Robbie Swan; 2. Liam Eales	4,873	1.45	+1.45
Family First	1. Peter Madden; 2. Andrew Goelst; 3. Nick Cramp; 4. Mihi Ngawhare	4,403	1.31	+0.09
Shooters and Fishers	1. Matthew Allen; 2. Shane Broadby	3,697	1.10	−0.91
Democratic Labour	1. Robyne Ferri; 2. Glen McNamara	2,598	0.77	+0.30
Australian Independents	1. Neville Solomon; 2. Steven Wood	2,494	0.74	+0.74
Pirate	1. Thomas Randle; 2. Thomas Storey	1,954	0.58	+0.58
HEMP	1. Matt Owen; 2. John Reeves	1,714	0.51	+0.51
Christians	1. Kevin Swarts; 2. Ans Jongeling	1,622	0.48	+0.48
Outdoor Recreation	1. Ian Best; 2. John Phibbs	1,399	0.42	+0.42
Katter's Australian	1. Geoff Herbert; 2. Joanne Rolls	1,375	0.41	+0.41
Rise Up Australia	1. Philip Lamont; 2. Peter Gathercole	996	0.30	+0.30
Country Alliance	1. Cheryl Arnol; 2. Debra Garth	951	0.28	+0.28
Smokers Rights	1. Graham Nickols; 2. Matthew Thompson	803	0.24	+0.24
Fishing and Lifestyle	1. Maxwell Stewart; 2. Lorraine Stewart	729	0.22	+0.22
Stable Population	1. Todd Dudley; 2. Pierre Richardson	372	0.11	+0.11
Independent	Andrew Roberts	332	0.10	+0.10
Climate Sceptics	1. James Hawes; 2. Petta Hines	211	0.06	−0.17
Senator Online	1. David Bullard; 2. Sven Wiener	104	0.03	−0.42
Republican	1. Nick Rouen; 2. Timothy Rouen	34	0.01	+0.01
Total formal votes		336,953	97.54	+0.77
Informal votes		8,486	2.46	−0.77
Turnout		345,439	95.13	−0.17

Elected	#	Senator	Party
2013	1	Richard Colbeck	Liberal
2013	2	Carol Brown	Labor
2013	3	David Bushby	Liberal
2013	4	Catryna Bilyk	Labor
2013	5	Peter Whish-Wilson	Greens
2013	6	Jacqui Lambie	Palmer
2010
2010	1	Helen Polley	Labor
2010	2	Eric Abetz	Liberal
2010	3	Christine Milne	Greens
2010	4	Anne Urquhart	Labor
2010	5	Stephen Parry	Liberal
2010	6	Lisa Singh	Labor

==== 2010 ====
2010 Australian federal election: Senate, Tasmania
Party	Candidate	Votes	%	±%
Quota		47,242		
Labor	1. Helen Polley (elected 1); 2. Anne Urquhart (elected 4); 3. Lisa Singh (elected 6)	136,908	41.40	+1.30
Liberal	1. Eric Abetz (elected 2); 2. Stephen Parry (elected 5); 3. Guy Barnett	109,023	32.97	−4.42
Greens	1. Christine Milne (elected 3); 2. Peter Whish-Wilson; 3. Penelope Ann	67,016	20.27	+2.14
Shooters and Fishers	1. Ray Williams; 2. Jeff Blackmore	6,649	2.01	+2.01
Family First	1. Jim Zubic; 2. Hamish Woodcock	4,045	1.22	−0.82
Democrats	1. Paulene Hutton; 2. Timothy Neal	1,608	0.49	+0.49
Democratic Labor	1. Mishka Gora; 2. Margaret Williams	1,560	0.47	−0.16
Senator On-Line	1. Julie Murray; 2. Sven Wiener	1,488	0.45	+0.45
Independent	Dino Ottavi	1,054	0.32	+0.32
Climate Sceptics	1. Frank Waller; 2. Sally Costella	766	0.23	+0.23
Secular	1. Jeff Keogh; 2. Jin-oh Choi	574	0.17	+0.17
Total formal votes		330,691	96.77	−0.60
Informal votes		11,047	3.23	+0.60
Turnout		341,738	95.30	−0.68

Elected	#	Senator	Party
2010	1	Helen Polley	Labor
2010	2	Eric Abetz	Liberal
2010	3	Christine Milne	Greens
2010	4	Anne Urquhart	Labor
2010	5	Stephen Parry	Liberal
2010	6	Lisa Singh	Labor
2007
2007	1	Nick Sherry	Labor
2007	2	Richard Colbeck	Liberal
2007	3	Bob Brown	Greens
2007	4	Carol Brown	Labor
2007	5	David Bushby	Liberal
2007	6	Catryna Bilyk	Labor

Primary votes saw the Liberals and Labor both win two seats and the Greens win one, which left Labor ahead of the Greens and the Liberals. It is possible that Liberal preferences may have pushed the Greens ahead of Labor, which would've led to them taking the final seat, but Shooters and Fishers preferences meant that the Liberals ended up ahead of the Greens, and Labor ended up taking the seat with Green preferences. The final result was three seats Labor, two seats Liberal and one seat Green.

=== Elections in the 2000s ===
==== 2007 ====
Elected	#	Senator	Party
2007	1	Nick Sherry	Labor
2007	2	Richard Colbeck	Liberal
2007	3	Bob Brown	Greens
2007	4	Carol Brown	Labor
2007	5	David Bushby	Liberal
2007	6	Catryna Bilyk	Labor
2004
2004	1	Eric Abetz	Liberal
2004	2	Kerry O'Brien	Labor
2004	3	Guy Barnett	Liberal
2004	4	Helen Polley	Labor
2004	5	Stephen Parry	Liberal
2004	6	Christine Milne	Greens

2007 Australian federal election: Senate, Tasmania
Party	Candidate	Votes	%	±%
Quota		46,693		
Labor	1. Nick Sherry (elected 1); 2. Carol Brown (elected 4); 3. Catryna Bilyk (elected 6)	131,055	40.10	+6.56
Liberal	1. Richard Colbeck (elected 2); 2. David Bushby (elected 5); 3. Don Morris	122,203	37.39	−8.74
Greens	1. Bob Brown (elected 3); 2. Andrew Wilkie; 3. Sophie Houghton; 4. Scott Jordan	59,254	18.13	+4.84
Family First	1. Jacquie Petrusma; 2. Andrew Bennett; 3. Betty Roberts	6,663	2.04	−0.34
What Women Want	1. Debra Cashion; 2. Belinda Gleeson	2,540	0.78	+0.78
Democratic Labor	1. Pat Crea; 2. Joan Shackcloth	2,061	0.63	+0.63
Group G	1. Dino Ottavi; 2. Mick Cook; 3. Chris Smallbane	1,398	0.43	+0.03
Group C	1. Steve Martin; 2. Karley Nelson	789	0.24	−0.12
Citizens Electoral Council	1. Caroline Larner; 2. Michael Phibbs	313	0.10	−0.06
Liberty & Democracy	1. Bede Ireland; 2. Luke Hamilton	302	0.09	+0.09
Secular	1. Robyn Doyle; 2. David Hammond	268	0.08	+0.08
Total formal votes		326,846	97.37	+0.74
Informal votes		8,830	2.63	−0.74
Turnout		335,676	95.98	+0.08

Labor finished ahead of the Liberals with around 40% of the vote each, followed by the Greens with over 18%. Labor and the Liberals each won two seats on primary vote alone whilst the Greens won one on primary vote. Preferences from the Greens led to Labor winning the remaining seat. The final result was three seats to Labor, two seats to the Liberals and one seat to the Greens.

==== 2004 ====
Elected	#	Senator	Party
2004	1	Eric Abetz	Liberal
2004	2	Kerry O'Brien	Labor
2004	3	Guy Barnett	Liberal
2004	4	Helen Polley	Labor
2004	5	Stephen Parry	Liberal
2004	6	Christine Milne	Greens
2001
2001	1	Paul Calvert	Liberal
2001	2	Sue Mackay	Labor
2004	3	John Watson	Liberal
2001	4	Nick Sherry	Labor
2001	5	Bob Brown	Greens
2001	6	Richard Colbeck	Liberal

2004 Australian federal election: Senate, Tasmania
Party	Candidate	Votes	%	±%
Quota		45,382		
Liberal	1. Eric Abetz (elected 1); 2. Guy Barnett (elected 3); 3. Stephen Parry (elected 5)	146,532	46.13	+7.34
Labor	1. Kerry O'Brien (elected 2); 2. Helen Polley (elected 4); 3. David Price; 4. Nicole Wells	106,531	33.54	−3.30
Greens	1. Christine Milne (elected 6); 2. Karen Cassidy; 3. Tom Millen	42,214	13.29	−0.50
Family First	1. Jacquie Petrusma; 2. Lance Bergman; 3. Lindsay Smith	7,563	2.38	+2.38
Group F	1. Shayne Murphy	6,888	2.17	+2.17
Democrats	1. Yulia Onsman; 2. Suzanne Cass	2,614	0.82	−3.80
Christian Democrats	1. David Mitchell; 2. Michael Fracalossi	2,076	0.65	+0.65
Independent	Dino Ottavi	1,283	0.40	+0.40
Group G (Harradine candidates)	1. Steve Martin; 2. John Newman	1,139	0.36	+0.36
Citizens Electoral Council	1. Rob Larner; 2. Adrian Watts	508	0.16	+0.16
Independent	Rob Newitt	188	0.06	+0.06
Independent	John McDonald	99	0.03	+0.03
Independent	Ellen Gargan	32	0.01	+0.01
Total formal votes		317,667	96.63	−0.08
Informal votes		11,091	3.37	+0.08
Turnout		328,758	95.90	−0.93

Primary votes saw the Liberal Party winning three senate seats and Labor winning two, leaving the Greens leading for the sixth seat against the Family First Party with a sizable majority. However, Tasmania was one of two states where Labor preferenced the Family First Party ahead the Greens, meaning that the Family First candidate Jacquie Petrusma was expected to receive large amounts of preferences and win the final seat. However, Greens candidate Christine Milne ended up winning the seat, mainly due to the high amount of "below the line" voting in Tasmania. The result was three seats Liberal, two seats Labor and one seat Green.

==== 2001 ====
Elected	#	Senator	Party
2001	1	Paul Calvert	Liberal
2001	2	Sue Mackay	Labor
2001	3	John Watson	Liberal
2001	4	Nick Sherry	Labor
2001	5	Bob Brown	Greens
2001	6	Richard Colbeck	Liberal
1998
1998	1	Kerry O'Brien	Labor
1998	2	Eric Abetz	Liberal
1998	3	Shayne Murphy	Independent (Note: Shayne Murphy had resigned from the Labor Party on 2 October 2001 and served out the rest of his term as an independent.)
1998	4	Brian Gibson	Liberal
1998	5	Kay Denman	Labor
1998	6	Brian Harradine	Independent

2001 Australian federal election: Senate, Tasmania
Party	Candidate	Votes	%	±%
Quota		44,095		
Liberal	1. Paul Calvert (elected 1); 2. John Watson (elected 3); 3. Richard Colbeck (elected 6)	119,720	38.79	+6.1
Labor	1. Sue Mackay (elected 2); 2. Nick Sherry (elected 4); 3. Catryna Bilyk	113,709	36.84	−4.6
Greens	Bob Brown (elected 5)	42,568	13.79	+8.0
Democrats	1. Debbie Butler; 2. Brendan Toohey	14,273	4.62	+0.7
One Nation	1. Bronwyn Boag; 2. Peter Stokes	10,169	3.29	−0.4
Tasmania First	1. Merilyn Crack; 2. David Jackson; 3. John Presser	3,895	1.26	−0.2
Liberals for Forests	1. Peter Pullinger; 2. Michael Thomas	1,892	0.61	+0.6
Independent	Eric Lockett	464	0.15	+0.1
Group D	1. Stephen Bonner; 2. Geoff Howard	414	0.13	+0.1
Group G	1. Alex Bainbridge; 2. Sarah Cleary	389	0.13	+0.1
Republican	1. Peter Consandine; 2. Bert Lawatsch	368	0.12	+0.0
Hope	1. James Bristow; 2. Shamara Petherbridge-de Tissera	368	0.12	+0.12
Independent	Helen Lane	268	0.09	+0.09
Independent	John Marmarinos	85	0.03	+0.03
Citizens Electoral Council	Rob Larner	82	0.03	+0.03
Total formal votes		308,662	96.71	−0.23
Informal votes		10,493	3.29	+0.23
Turnout		319,155	96.83	+0.37

=== Elections in the 1990s ===
==== 1998 ====
Elected	#	Senator	Party
1998
1998	1	Kerry O'Brien	Labor
1998	2	Eric Abetz	Liberal
1998	3	Shayne Murphy	Labor
1998	4	Brian Gibson	Liberal
1998	5	Brian Harradine	Independent
1998	6	Kay Denman	Labor
1996
1996	1	Jocelyn Newman	Liberal
1996	2	Sue Mackay	Labor
1996	3	Paul Calvert	Liberal
1996	4	Nick Sherry	Labor
1996	5	John Watson	Liberal
1996	6	Bob Brown	Greens

1998 Australian federal election: Senate, Tasmania
Party	Candidate	Votes	%	±%
Quota		44,054		
Labor	1. Kerry O'Brien (elected 1); 2. Shayne Murphy (elected 3); 3. Kay Denman (elected 6)	128,377	41.6	+2.5
Liberal	1. Eric Abetz (elected 2); 2. Brian Gibson (elected 4); 3. Guy Barnett; 4. Peter Collenette	104,268	33.8	−8.4
Independent	Brian Harradine (elected 5)	24,254	7.9	+7.9
Greens	1. Louise Crossley; 2. Simon Baptist	17,905	5.8	−2.9
Democrats	1. Robert Bell; 2. Debbie Butler; 3. Chris Ivory	12,107	3.9	−3.2
One Nation	1. Peter Stokes; 2. Michael Cartwright; 3. Leigh Spicer	11,655	3.7	+3.7
Tasmania First	1. David Pickford; 2. David Jackson; 3. Petita Abblitt	4,548	1.5	+1.5
Abolish Child Support	1. Ian Hickman; 2. Fred Lombardi	1,750	0.5	+0.5
Christian Democrats	1. Don Rogers; 2. Beryl Rogers	945	0.3	−0.2
Women's Party	1. Lin MacQueen; 2. Carolyn Bindon	804	0.2	−0.4
Democratic Socialist	1. Kamala Emanuel; 2. Ian Jamieson	754	0.2	+0.2
Independent	Norma Jamieson	659	0.2	+0.2
Republican	1. Jenny Sheridan; 2. Rena Dare	249	0.1	+0.1
Independent	Laurie Heathorn	75	0.0	0.0
Independent	Steven Suli	27	0.0	0.0
Total formal votes		308,377	97.0	+0.2
Informal votes		9,704	3.0	−0.2
Turnout		318,081	96.5	−0.4

==== 1996 ====
Elected	#	Senator	Party
1996
1996	1	Jocelyn Newman	Liberal
1996	2	Sue Mackay	Labor
1996	3	Paul Calvert	Liberal
1996	4	Nick Sherry	Labor
1996	5	John Watson	Liberal
1996	6	Bob Brown	Greens
1993
1993	1	Kay Denman	Labor
1993	2	Eric Abetz	Liberal
1993	3	John Coates	Labor
1993	4	Brian Gibson	Liberal
1993	5	Brian Harradine	Independent
1993	6	Shayne Murphy	Labor

1996 Australian federal election: Senate, Tasmania
Party	Candidate	Votes	%	±%
Quota		44,139		
Liberal	1. Jocelyn Newman (elected 1); 2. Paul Calvert (elected 3); 3. John Watson (elected 5)	130,552	42.2	+5.5
Labor	1. Sue Mackay (elected 2); 2. Nick Sherry (elected 4); 3. Charles Touber	120,678	39.1	−3.6
Greens	1. Bob Brown (elected 6); 2. Janet Dale	26,830	8.9	+2.0
Democrats	1. Robert Bell; 2. Julia Onsman; 3. Philip Tattersall	22,006	7.1	+5.5
National	1. Mary Jackson; 2. Jeff Clayton	3,554	1.2	+1.2
Women's Party	1. Claire Andersen; 2. Lin MacQueen	1,881	0.6	+0.6
Natural Law	1. Gregory Broszczyk; 2. James James Harlow	1,811	0.6	+0.6
Call to Australia	1. Don Rogers; 2. Beryl Rogers	1,519	0.5	+0.5
Total formal votes		308,970	96.8	−0.6
Informal votes		10,083	3.2	+0.6
Turnout		319,053	96.9	+0.3

==== 1993 ====
Elected	#	Senator	Party
1993	1	Michael Tate	Labor
1993	2	Brian Archer	Liberal
1993	3	John Coates	Labor
1993	4	Brian Gibson	Liberal
1993	5	Brian Harradine	Independent
1993	6	Shayne Murphy	Labor
1990	1	Jocelyn Newman	Liberal
1990	2	Nick Sherry	Labor
1990	3	John Watson	Liberal
1990	4	John Devereux	Labor
1990	5	Paul Calvert	Liberal
1990	6	Robert Bell	Democrat

1993 Australian federal election: Senate, Tasmania
Party	Candidate	Votes	%	±%
Quota		44,110		
Labor	1. Michael Tate (elected 1); 2. John Coates (elected 3); 3. Shayne Murphy (elected 6); 4. Terry Aulich	131,876	42.7	+1.4
Liberal	1. Brian Archer (elected 2); 2. Brian Gibson (elected 4); 3. Eric Abetz	113,347	36.7	−7.4
Independent	Brian Harradine (elected 5)	32,202	10.4	+10.4
Greens	1. Judy Henderson; 2. Peter Jones; 3. Marion Fry	21,087	6.9	+6.9
Democrats	1. Patsy Harmsen; 2. David Stephen	5,162	1.6	−5.7
Tasmania First	1. Alan Sproule; 2. Frances McShane	2,815	0.9	+0.9
Call to Australia	1. Philip Hopson; 2. Janelle Hopson	1,512	0.5	+0.5
Natural Law	1. Greg Broszczyk; 2. Caroline Davies	490	0.1	+0.1
Independent	Ian Jamieson	265	0.1	+0.1
Total formal votes		308,763	97.4	+0.5
Informal votes		8,121	2.6	−0.5
Turnout		316,884	96.6	−0.3

==== 1990 ====
Elected	#	Senator	Party
1990
1990	1	Jocelyn Newman	Liberal
1990	2	Nick Sherry	Labor
1990	3	John Watson	Liberal
1990	4	John Devereux	Labor
1990	5	Paul Calvert	Liberal
1990	6	Robert Bell	Democrats
1987
1987	1	Michael Tate	Labor
1987	2	Brian Archer	Liberal
1987	3	Brian Harradine	Independent
1987	4	John Coates	Labor
1987	5	Shirley Walters	Liberal
1987	6	Terry Aulich	Labor

1990 Australian federal election: Senate, Tasmania
Party	Candidate	Votes	%	±%
Quota		41,614		
Liberal	1. Jocelyn Newman (elected 1); 2. John Watson (elected 3); 3. Paul Calvert (elected 5)	128,374	44.1	+5.4
Labor	1. Nick Sherry (elected 2); 2. John Devereux (elected 4); 3. Jacquie Murphy; 4. Sue Mackay	120,195	41.3	+0.5
Democrats	1. Robert Bell (elected 6); 2. Sarah Hancock	22,888	7.8	+1.1
United Tasmania	1. Michael Lynch; 2. Juliet Lavers; 3. Joan Staples; 4. Eva Ruzicka	14,160	4.9	+4.9
Democratic Socialist	1. Kath Gelber; 2. Scott Lewington	4,957	1.8	+1.8
Independent	John Gademski	718	0.3	+0.3
Total formal votes		291,292	96.9	+0.7
Informal votes		9,300	3.1	−0.7
Turnout		300,592	96.9	+0.5

=== Elections in the 1980s ===
==== 1987 ====
1987 Australian federal election: Senate, Tasmania
Party	Candidate	Votes	%	±%
Quota		21,451		
Labor	1. Michael Tate (elected 1); 2. John Coates (elected 4); 3. Terry Aulich (elected 6); 4. Ray Devlin (elected 8); 5. John Devereux (elected 10); 6. Janet Cooper; 7. John Green	113,638	40.8	−0.8
Liberal	1. Brian Archer (elected 2); 2. Shirley Walters (elected 5); 3. John Watson (elected 7); 4. Jocelyn Newman (elected 9); 5. Paul Calvert (elected 11); 6. Vince Smith; 7. Peter Aldridge	108,039	38.7	−2.0
Harradine Group	1. Brian Harradine (elected 3); 2. Colin Sacco	37,037	13.3	+4.5
Democrats	1. Norm Sanders (elected 12); 2. Nick Goldie; 3. Isla Macgregor	18,841	6.8	+0.7
Independent	Michael Mansell	1,102	0.4	+0.4
Independent	Laurie Heathorn	203	0.1	+0.1
Total formal votes		278,860	96.2	+2.0
Informal votes		11,119	3.8	−2.0
Turnout		289,979	96.4	+0.6

#	Senator	Party
1	Michael Tate	Labor
2	Brian Archer	Liberal
3	Brian Harradine	Independent
4	John Coates	Labor
5	Shirley Walters	Liberal
6	Terry Aulich	Labor
7	John Watson	Liberal
8	Ray Devlin	Labor
9	Jocelyn Newman	Liberal
10	John Devereux	Labor
11	Paul Calvert	Liberal
12	Norm Sanders	Democrats

==== 1984 ====
Elected	#	Senator	Party
1985
1985	1	Terry Aulich	Labor
1985	2	Brian Archer	Liberal
1985	3	Ray Devlin	Labor
1985	4	John Watson	Liberal
1985	5	John Coates	Labor
1985	6	Michael Townley	Liberal
1985	7	Norm Sanders	Democrats
1982
1982	1	Peter Rae	Liberal
1982	2	Don Grimes	Labor
1982	3	Brian Harradine	Independent
1982	4	Shirley Walters	Liberal
1982	5	Michael Tate	Labor

1984 Australian federal election: Senate, Tasmania
Party	Candidate	Votes	%	±%
Quota		32,724		
Labor	1. Terry Aulich (elected 1); 2. Ray Devlin (elected 3); 3. John Coates (elected 5); 4. John White	108,900	41.6	+8.8
Liberal	1. Brian Archer (elected 2); 2. John Watson (elected 4); 3. Michael Townley (elected 6); 4. Eric Abetz; 5. Des Cooper; 6. Michael Chabrel	106,427	40.6	−2.0
Group C (Harradine Group)	1. Kath Venn; 2. Colin Sacco	22,992	8.8	−9.0
Democrats	1. Norm Sanders (elected 7}; 2. Lyn Hewitt	15,897	6.1	−0.7
Nuclear Disarmament	1. Ian Paulin; 2. Anne Parker	7,574	2.9	+2.9
Total formal votes		261,790	94.2	+1.6
Informal votes		16,155	5.8	−1.6
Turnout		277,945	95.8	−0.2

==== 1983 ====
1983 Australian federal election: Senate, Tasmania
Party	Candidate	Votes	%	±%
Quota		22,809		
Liberal	1. Peter Rae (elected 1); 2. Shirley Walters (elected 4); 3. Brian Archer (elected 6); 4. Michael Townley (elected 8); 5. John Watson (elected 10); 6. Gordon Ibbett	106,768	42.6	+3.2
Labor	1. Don Grimes (elected 2); 2. Michael Tate (elected 5); 3. Jean Hearn (elected 7); 4. John Coates (elected 9); 5. John White; 6. Vicki Buchanan	82,343	32.8	−2.8
Group D	1. Brian Harradine (elected 3); 2. John Jones	44,696	17.8	−4.0
Democrats	1. Norm Sanders; 2. Peter Creet; 3. Margaret Duthoit	17,089	6.8	+3.6
Total formal votes		250,896	92.6	+0.1
Informal votes		20,104	7.4	−0.1
Turnout		271,000	96.0	−0.3

#	Senator	Party
1	Peter Rae	Liberal
2	Don Grimes	Labor
3	Brian Harradine	Independent
4	Shirley Walters	Liberal
5	Michael Tate	Labor
6	Brian Archer	Liberal
7	Jean Hearn	Labor
8	Michael Townley	Liberal
9	John Coates	Labor
10	John Watson	Liberal

==== 1980 ====
Elected	#	Senator	Party
1981
1981	1	Peter Rae	Liberal
1981	2	Jean Hearn	Labor
1981	3	Brian Harradine	Independent
1981	4	Michael Townley	Liberal
1981	5	John Coates	Labor
1978
1978	1	Shirley Walters	Liberal
1978	2	Don Grimes	Labor
1978	3	Brian Archer	Liberal
1978	4	Michael Tate	Labor
1978	5	John Watson	Liberal

1980 Australian federal election: Senate, Tasmania
Party	Candidate	Votes	%	±%
Quota		40,640		
Liberal	1. Peter Rae (elected 1); 2. Michael Townley (elected 4); 3. Peter Jones	96,098	39.4	−10.4
Labor	1. Jean Hearn (elected 2); 2. John Coates (elected 5); 3. John White	86,833	35.6	−2.1
Group B	1. Brian Harradine (elected 3); 2. Harry Upston	52,247	21.4	+21.4
Democrats	1. Norman Siberry; 2. Rae Saxon; 3. Brian Austen	7,780	3.2	−2.7
Total formal votes		243,838	92.5	−0.4
Informal votes		19,651	7.5	+0.4
Turnout		263,489	96.3	−0.4

=== Elections in the 1910s ===
==== 1914 ====
Each elector voted for up to six candidates. Percentages refer to the number of voters rather than the number of votes.

1914 Australian federal election: Senate, Tasmania
Party	Candidate	Votes	%	±%
Labor	David O'Keefe (re-elected 1)	39,879	50.9	−5.3 (Note: Change compared to the personal vote at the 1910 election.)
Labor	James Long (re-elected 2)	39,853	50.8	−4.8
Labor	James Guy (elected 3)	39,656	50.6	+6.2 (Note: Change compared to the personal vote at the 1913 election.)
Liberal	John Keating (re-elected 4)	39,193	50.0	−2.3
Labor	Rudolph Ready (re-elected 5)	38,779	49.5	−3.9
Liberal	Thomas Bakhap (re-elected 6)	38,779	49.5	−3.3
Labor	William Shoobridge	38,096	48.6	
Liberal	Edward Mulcahy	38,016	48.5	
Liberal	Louis Shoobridge	38,006	48.5	
Labor	James McDonald	37,771	48.2	
Liberal	John Clemons (defeated)	36,577	46.7	−4.0
Liberal	Hubert Nichols	36,325	46.3	
Independent	Cyril Cameron	6,979	8.9	+2.8
Independent	David Blanchard	2,820	3.6	
Total formal votes		470,292; 78,382 voters	95.29	+1.51
Informal votes		3,871	4.71	−1.51
Turnout		82,253	77.61	+2.30
Party total votes
Labor		234,034	49.76	+3.52
Liberal		226,459	48.15	−3.57
Independent		9,799	2.08	+0.04

==== 1913 ====
Each elector voted for up to three candidates. Percentages refer to the number of voters rather than the number of votes.

1913 Australian federal election: Senate, Tasmania
Party	Candidate	Votes	%	±%
Liberal	John Keating (re-elected 1)	39,409	52.3	+1.2 (Note: Change compared to the personal vote at the 1906 election.)
Liberal	Thomas Bakhap (elected 2)	39,331	52.2	
Liberal	John Clemons (re-elected 2)	38,249	50.7	−0.4
Labour	James Guy	35,062	44.4	+2.1
Labour	James Ogden	34,951	46.4	
Labour	James Hurst	34,583	45.9	
Independent	Cyril Cameron (defeated) (Note: Cyril Cameron lost Liberal pre-selection and contested the election as an Independent.)	4,615	6.1	−47.6
Total formal votes		226,200; 75,400 voters	93.8	
Informal votes		4,998	6.2	
Turnout		80,398	75.3	
Party total votes
Liberal		116,989	51.7	+8.0
Labour		104,596	46.2	−8.9
Independent		4,615	2.0	

==== 1910 ====
Each elector voted for up to three candidates. Percentages refer to the number of voters rather than the number of votes.

1910 Australian federal election: Senate, Tasmania
Party	Candidate	Votes	%	±%
Labour	David O'Keefe (elected 1)	31,304	56.2	+8.8
Labour	James Long (re-elected 2)	30,973	55.6	
Labour	Rudolph Ready (elected 3)	29,756	53.4	
Liberal	Henry Dobson (defeated)	24,422	43.8	−6.8 (Note: Change compared to the personal vote at the 1903 election.)
Liberal	Edward Mulcahy (defeated)	24,419	43.8	+7.9
Liberal	James Macfarlane (defeated)	24,233	43.5	−0.9
Independent	James Campbell	2,041	3.8	
Total formal votes		167,148; 55,716 voters		
Informal votes		unknown		
Turnout		unknown		
Party total votes
Labour		92,033	55.1	+24.5
Liberal		73,074	43.7	−25.7 (Note: Change compared to the combined Anti-Socialist and Protectionist vote at the 1906 election.)

=== Elections in the 1900s ===
==== 1906 ====
Each elector voted for up to three candidates. Percentages refer to the number of voters rather than the number of votes.

1906 Australian federal election: Senate, Tasmania
Party	Candidate	Votes	%	±%
Anti-Socialist	Cyril Cameron (elected 1)	25,089	53.7	
Anti-Socialist	John Clemons (re-elected 2)	24,844	51.1	
Protectionist	John Keating (re-elected 3)	23,862	51.1	
Anti-Socialist	Norman Ewing	23,390	50.1	
Labour	David O'Keefe (defeated)	22,128	47.4	
Labour	James Guy	20,748	44.4	
Total formal votes		140,061; 46,687 voters	95.5	
Informal votes		2,192	4.5	
Turnout		48,879	54.2	
Party total votes
Anti-Socialist		73,323	52.4	
Labour		42,876	30.6	
Protectionist		23,862	17.0	

==== 1903 ====
Each elector voted for up to three candidates. Percentages refer to the number of voters rather than the number of votes.

1903 Australian federal election: Senate, Tasmania
Party	Candidate	Votes	%	±%
Revenue Tariff	Henry Dobson (re-elected 1)	17,979	50.6	
Free Trade	James Macfarlane (re-elected 2)	15,796	44.4	
Protectionist	Edward Mulcahy (elected 3)	12,762	35.9	
Protectionist	Cyril Cameron (defeated)	12,094	34.0	
Labour	Milner Macmaster	11,333	31.9	
Labour	Charles Metz	9,776	27.5	
Labour	James Mahoney	8,728	24.6	
Revenue Tariff	Stafford Bird	7,331	20.6	
Free Trade	James Waldron	6,776	19.1	
Free Trade	Edward Miles	4,062	11.4	
Total formal votes		106,637; 35,546 voters	96.1	
Informal votes		1,441	3.9	
Turnout		36,987	45.0	
Party total votes
Labour		29,837	28.0	
Free Trade		26,634	25.0	
Revenue Tariff		25,310	23.7	
Protectionist		24,856	23.3	

==== 1901 ====
Each elector cast a single vote, Tasmania being the only state to use this method.

There was no labour organisation in Tasmania, although O'Keefe joined the Labour caucus when parliament sat.

1901 Australian federal election: Senate, Tasmania
Party	Candidate	Votes	%	±%
Protectionist	John Keating (elected 1)	3,761	20.4	+20.4
Free Trade	John Clemons (elected 2)	2,520	13.7	+13.7
Protectionist	David O'Keefe (elected 3)	1,904	10.3	+10.3
Free Trade	Henry Dobson (elected 4)	1,566	8.5	+8.5
Protectionist	Cyril Cameron (elected 5)	1,452	7.9	+7.9
Free Trade	James Macfarlane (elected 6)	1,199	6.5	+6.5
Ind. Free Trade	Don Urquhart	1,156	6.3	+6.3
Protectionist	William Moore	968	5.3	+5.3
Free Trade	Jonathan Best	962	5.2	+5.2
Ind. Free Trade	James Waldron	758	4.1	+4.1
Free Trade	Henry Murray	740	4.0	+4.0
Free Trade	Robert Patterson	585	3.2	+3.2
Ind. Free Trade	Alfred Page	414	2.2	+2.2
Ind. Free Trade	Joseph Woollnough	230	1.2	+1.2
Ind. Free Trade	Arthur Morrisby	188	1.0	+1.0
Total formal votes		18,403	97.8	
Informal votes		417	2.2	
Turnout		18,820	48.4	
Party total votes
Protectionist		8,085	43.9	+43.9
Free Trade		7,572	41.1	+41.1
Ind. Free Trade		2,746	14.9	+14.9

== See also ==
- List of senators from Tasmania
