= Members of the Australian Senate, 1993–1996 =

Senate composition at 1 July 1993
Government (30)
Labor (30) – (9 seat minority) (Note: John Devereux resigned from the Labor Party on 21 December 1994, and sat as an independent until his resignation from the Senate on 7 February 1996. Sue Mackay, a Labor member, was appointed as his replacement on 8 March.)

Opposition (36)
Liberal (29)
National Party (6)
Country Liberal (1)

Crossbench (10)
Democrats (7)
WA Greens (2)
Independent (Harradine) (1)

Changes in composition

This is a list of members of the Australian Senate from 1993 to 1996. Half of the state senators had been elected at the March 1990 election and had terms due to finish on 30 June 1996; the other half of the state senators were elected at the March 1993 election and had terms due to finish on 30 June 1999. The territory senators were elected at the March 1993 election and their terms ended at the next federal election, which was March 1996.

Senator	Party	State	Term ending	Years in office
Eric Abetz (Note: Tasmanian Liberal Senator Brian Archer resigned on 31 January 1994. Eric Abetz was appointed as his replacement on 22 February.)	Liberal	Tasmania	1999	1994–2022
Richard Alston	Liberal	Victoria	1996	1986–2004
Brian Archer (Note: Father of the Senate)	Liberal	Tasmania	1999	1975–1994
Michael Baume	Liberal	New South Wales	1999	1984–1996
Michael Beahan	Labor	Western Australia	1996	1987–1996
Robert Bell	Democrats	Tasmania	1996	1990–1996
Bronwyn Bishop (Note: New South Wales Liberal Senator Bronwyn Bishop resigned on 24 February 1994. Bob Woods was appointed as her replacement on 8 March.)	Liberal	New South Wales	1996	1987–1994
Nick Bolkus	Labor	South Australia	1999	1981–2005
Ron Boswell	National	Queensland	1996	1983–2014
Vicki Bourne	Democrats	New South Wales	1996	1990–2002
David Brownhill	National	New South Wales	1996	1984–2000
Bryant Burns	Labor	Queensland	1996	1987–1996
Paul Calvert	Liberal	Tasmania	1996	1987–2007
Ian Campbell	Liberal	Western Australia	1999	1990–2007
Kim Carr	Labor	Victoria	1999	1993–2022
Christabel Chamarette	WA Greens	Western Australia	1996	1992–1996
Grant Chapman	Liberal	South Australia	1996	1987–2008
Bruce Childs	Labor	New South Wales	1996	1980–1997
John Coates	Labor	Tasmania	1999	1980–1996
Bob Collins	Labor	Northern Territory	1996 (Note: The term of a territory senator ends at the dissolution of the House of Representatives, which was March 1996.)	1987–1998
Jacinta Collins (Note: Victorian Labor Senator Olive Zakharov died on 6 March 1995. Jacinta Collins was appointed as her replacement on 3 May.)	Labor	Victoria	1999	1995–2005, 2008–2019
Mal Colston	Labor	Queensland	1999	1975–1999
Stephen Conroy (Note: Victorian Labor Senator Gareth Evans resigned on 6 February 1996, to run for the House of Representatives seat of Holt. Steve Conroy was appointed as his replacement on 30 April.)	Labor	Victoria	1999	1996–2016
Peter Cook	Labor	Western Australia	1999	1983–2005
Barney Cooney	Labor	Victoria	1996	1984–2002
John Coulter (Note: South Australian Democrat Senator John Coulter resigned on 20 November 1995. Natasha Stott Despoja was appointed as his replacement on 23 November.)	Democrats	South Australia	1996	1987–1995
Winston Crane	Liberal	Western Australia	1996	1990–2002
Noel Crichton-Browne	Liberal	Western Australia	1996	1980–1996
Rosemary Crowley	Labor	South Australia	1996	1983–2002
Kay Denman (Note: Tasmanian Labor Senator Michael Tate resigned on 5 July 1993. Kay Denman was appointed as his replacement on 24 August.)	Labor	Tasmania	1999	1993–2005
John Devereux (Note: Tasmanian Senator John Devereux resigned from the Labor Party on 21 December 1994, and sat as an independent until his resignation from the Senate on 7 February 1996. Though he was an independent at the time of his resignation, because he had been elected as a Labor member, Sue Mackay, a Labor member, was appointed as his replacement on 8 March.)	Labor/Independent	Tasmania	1996	1987–1996
Chris Ellison	Liberal	Western Australia	1999	1993–2009
Chris Evans	Labor	Western Australia	1999	1993–2013
Gareth Evans	Labor	Victoria	1999	1977–1996
John Faulkner	Labor	New South Wales	1999	1989–2015
Alan Ferguson	Liberal	South Australia	1999	1992–2011
Dominic Foreman	Labor	South Australia	1999	1980–1997
Michael Forshaw (Note: New South Wales Labor Senator Graham Richardson resigned on 25 March 1994. Michael Forshaw was appointed as his replacement on 10 May.)	Labor	New South Wales	1999	1994–2011
Brian Gibson	Liberal	Tasmania	1999	1993–2002
Brian Harradine	Independent	Tasmania	1999	1975–2005
John Herron	Liberal	Queensland	1996	1990–2002
Robert Hill	Liberal	South Australia	1996	1981–2006
Gerry Jones	Labor	Queensland	1996	1980–1996
Rod Kemp	Liberal	Victoria	1996	1990–2008
Cheryl Kernot	Democrats	Queensland	1996	1990–1997
Sue Knowles	Liberal	Western Australia	1999	1984–2005
Meg Lees	Democrats	South Australia	1999	1990–2005
Stephen Loosley (Note: New South Wales Labor Senator Stephen Loosley resigned on 21 May 1995. Tom Wheelwright was appointed as his replacement on 24 May.)	Labor	New South Wales	1996	1990–1995
Ian Macdonald	Liberal	Queensland	1996	1990–2019
Sandy Macdonald	National	New South Wales	1999	1993–1999, 2000–2008
David MacGibbon	Liberal	Queensland	1999	1977–1999
Sue Mackay	Labor	Tasmania	1996	1996–2005
Julian McGauran	National	Victoria	1999	1987–1990, 1993–2011
Jim McKiernan	Labor	Western Australia	1996	1984–2002
Bob McMullan (Note: ACT Labor Senator Bob McMullan resigned on 6 February 1996 in order to contest a lower house seat at the 2 March 1996 election. His term was due to expire on 1 March 1996 and the ACT Legislative Assembly decided not to fill the vacancy.)	Labor	Australian Capital Territory	1996	1988–1996
Dee Margetts	WA Greens	Western Australia	1999	1993–1999
Nick Minchin	Liberal	South Australia	1999	1993–2011
Shayne Murphy	Labor	Tasmania	1999	1993–2005
Belinda Neal (Note: New South Wales Labor Senator Kerry Sibraa resigned on 1 February 1994. Belinda Neal was appointed as his replacement on 8 March.)	Labor	New South Wales	1999	1994–1998
Jocelyn Newman	Liberal	Tasmania	1996	1986–2002
Bill O'Chee	National	Queensland	1999	1990–1999
John Panizza	Liberal	Western Australia	1996	1987–1997
Warwick Parer	Liberal	Queensland	1999	1984–2000
Kay Patterson	Liberal	Victoria	1996	1987–2008
Robert Ray	Labor	Victoria	1996	1981–2008
Margaret Reid	Liberal	Australian Capital Territory	1996	1981–2003
Margaret Reynolds	Labor	Queensland	1999	1983–1999
Graham Richardson	Labor	New South Wales	1999	1983–1994
Chris Schacht	Labor	South Australia	1996	1987–2002
Nick Sherry	Labor	Tasmania	1996	1990–2012
Jim Short	Liberal	Victoria	1999	1984–1997
Kerry Sibraa	Labor	New South Wales	1999	1975–1978, 1978–1994
Sid Spindler	Democrats	Victoria	1996	1990–1996
Natasha Stott Despoja	Democrats	South Australia	1996	1995–2008
Grant Tambling	Country Liberal	Northern Territory	1996	1987–2001
Michael Tate	Labor	Tasmania	1999	1977–1993
Baden Teague	Liberal	South Australia	1996	1977–1996
John Tierney	Liberal	New South Wales	1999	1991–2005
Judith Troeth	Liberal	Victoria	1999	1993–2011
Amanda Vanstone	Liberal	South Australia	1999	1984–2007
John Watson	Liberal	Tasmania	1996	1978–2008
Sue West	Labor	New South Wales	1996	1987, 1990–2002
Tom Wheelwright	Labor	New South Wales	1996	1995–1996
John Woodley	Democrats	Queensland	1999	1993–2001
Bob Woods	Liberal	New South Wales	1996	1994–1997
Olive Zakharov	Labor	Victoria	1999	1983–1995
