= Members of the Australian Senate, 1985–1987 =

Senate composition at 1 July 1985
Government (34)
Labor (34) – (5 seat minority)

Opposition (33)
Liberal (27)
National Party (5)
Country Liberal (1)

Crossbench (9)
Democrats (7)
Nuclear Disarmament Party (1) (Note: Jo Vallentine was elected as a Nuclear Disarmament Party member, but resigned in 1985 and served out the remainder of her term as an independent.)
Independent (Harradine) (1)

Changes in composition

This is a list of members of the Australian Senate from 1985 to 1987. The number of senators was increased from ten to twelve senators for each of the six states of Australia. The representation of the Northern Territory and the Australian Capital Territory remained at two senators each. This would give a total of 76 senators in the Senate.

30 state senators were elected at the 1983 double dissolution election and were allocated 6-year terms starting on 1 July 1982 and due to finish on 30 June 1988. The other 30 state senators elected were allocated 3-year terms starting on 1 July 1982 and due to finish on 30 June 1985, and were up for reelection in the 1984 election.

With 30 senators having terms due to finish in 1988, the other 42 state and 4 territory senators were elected at the 1984 election, rather than the normal case of only half of the state senators being elected. Therefore, each state would elect 7 senators instead of previous 5 in this election. With the increase of 12 state senators, some changes were made to the terms of senators elected in this election as per Representation Act 1983:

- The first two non-sitting state senators to be elected (total 12) were chosen for a term starting immediately (1 December 1984) instead of the usual 1 July 1985. This would immediately increase the number of senators to 76 following the election. Terms were due to end on 30 June 1991 unless the senator(s) was elected last (7th) in the state (see next point).
- The last (7th) state senators to be elected (total 6) were chosen for a term ending 30 June 1988. This would ensure that exactly half of the state senators (36 in total) would have their terms ending on 30 June 1988.

The changes affected 17 elected state senators, with David Vigor satisfying both criteria. All other state senators were elected as normal and had 6-year terms due to finish on 30 June 1991. The four territory senators elected had terms due to finish at the next dissolution of the House of Representatives as normal. However, the Senate was dissolved on 5 June 1987 for another double dissolution election on 11 July 1987.

Senator	Party	State	Term ending	Years in office
Richard Alston (Note: Victorian Liberal Senator Alan Missen died on 30 March 1986. Richard Alston was appointed as his replacement on 7 May.)	Liberal	Victoria	1991	1986–2004
Brian Archer	Liberal	Tasmania	1991	1975–1994
Terry Aulich	Labor	Tasmania	1991 (Note: New senator elected for a term from 1 December 1984 unil 30 June 1991.)	1984–1993
Michael Baume	Liberal	New South Wales	1991	1985–1996
Peter Baume	Liberal	New South Wales	1988	1974–1991
Florence Bjelke-Petersen	National	Queensland	1988	1980–1993
John Black	Labor	Queensland	1991	1984–1990
Nick Bolkus	Labor	South Australia	1991	1981–2005
Ron Boswell	National	Queensland	1991	1983–2014
David Brownhill	National	New South Wales	1991	1984–2000
John Button	Labor	Victoria	1988	1974–1993
Sir John Carrick	Liberal	New South Wales	1988	1970–1987
Fred Chaney	Liberal	Western Australia	1988	1974–1990
Bruce Childs	Labor	New South Wales	1991	1980–1997
Don Chipp (Note: Victorian Democrat Senator Don Chipp resigned on 18 August 1986. Janet Powell was appointed as his replacement on 28 August.)	Democrats	Victoria	1988	1977–1986
John Coates	Labor	Tasmania	1991	1980–1996
Ruth Coleman	Labor	Western Australia	1988	1974–1987
Stan Collard	National	Queensland	1988	1975–1987
Mal Colston	Labor	Queensland	1988	1975–1999
Barney Cooney	Labor	Victoria	1991	1984–2002
Peter Cook	Labor	Western Australia	1991	1983–2005
Noel Crichton-Browne	Liberal	Western Australia	1991	1980–1996
Rosemary Crowley	Labor	South Australia	1991	1983–2002
Ray Devlin	Labor	Tasmania	1991	1984–1990
Peter Durack	Liberal	Western Australia	1988	1970–1993
Ron Elstob	Labor	South Australia	1988	1977–1987
Gareth Evans	Labor	Victoria	1988	1977–1996
Dominic Foreman	Labor	South Australia	1988	1980–1997
George Georges	Labor	Queensland	1988	1967–1987
Arthur Gietzelt	Labor	New South Wales	1988	1970–1989
Patricia Giles	Labor	Western Australia	1991	1980–1993
Don Grimes (Note: Tasmanian Labor Senator Don Grimes resigned on 2 April 1987 however he was not replaced by the Tasmanian Parliament as a result of a tied vote.)	Labor	Tasmania	1988	1974–1987
Dame Margaret Guilfoyle	Liberal	Victoria	1988	1970–1987
Janine Haines	Democrats	South Australia	1988	1977–1978, 1980–1990
David Hamer	Liberal	Victoria	1991	1977–1990
Brian Harradine	Independent	Tasmania	1988	1975–2005
Robert Hill	Liberal	South Australia	1988	1981–2006
Don Jessop	Liberal	South Australia	1991	1970–1991
Gerry Jones	Labor	Queensland	1991	1980–1996
Bernie Kilgariff	Country Liberal	Northern Territory	1987 (Note: The term of a territory senator ends at the dissolution of the House of Representatives, which was July 1987.)	1975–1987
Sue Knowles	Liberal	Western Australia	1991	1984–2005
Austin Lewis	Liberal	Victoria	1988	1976–1993
David MacGibbon	Liberal	Queensland	1991	1977–1999
Michael Macklin	Democrats	Queensland	1988 (Note: The 7th senator elected, for a term from 1 July 1985 until 30 June 1988.)	1980–1990
Graham Maguire	Labor	South Australia	1991	1983–1993
Colin Mason	Democrats	New South Wales	1988	1977–1987
Doug McClelland (Note: Father of the Senate) (Note: New South Wales Labor Senator Doug McClelland resigned on 23 January 1987. Sue West was appointed as his replacement on 11 February.)	Labor	New South Wales	1988	1961–1987
Gordon McIntosh	Labor	Western Australia	1988	1974–1987
Jim McKiernan	Labor	Western Australia	1991	1984–2002
Tony Messner	Liberal	South Australia	1988	1975–1990
Alan Missen	Liberal	Victoria	1991	1974–1986
John Morris	Labor	New South Wales	1991	1985–1990
Jocelyn Newman (Note: Tasmanian Liberal Senator Peter Rae resigned on 16 January 1986. Jocelyn Newman was appointed as his replacement on 13 March.)	Liberal	Tasmania	1988	1986–2002
Warwick Parer	Liberal	Queensland	1988	1984–2000
Janet Powell	Democrats	Victoria	1988	1986–1993
Chris Puplick	Liberal	New South Wales	1991	1978–1980, 1984–1990
Peter Rae	Liberal	Tasmania	1988	1967–1986
Robert Ray	Labor	Victoria	1991	1981–2008
Margaret Reid	Liberal	Australian Capital Territory	1987	1981–2003
Margaret Reynolds	Labor	Queensland	1991	1983–1999
Graham Richardson	Labor	New South Wales	1988	1983–1994
Ted Robertson	Labor	Northern Territory	1987	1975–1987
Susan Ryan	Labor	Australian Capital Territory	1987	1975–1988
Norm Sanders	Democrats	Tasmania	1988	1985–1990
Glen Sheil	National	Queensland	1991	1974–1981, 1984–1990
Jim Short	Liberal	Victoria	1991	1984–1997
Kerry Sibraa	Labor	New South Wales	1991	1975–1978, 1978–1994
John Siddons	Democrats/Unite Australia	Victoria	1988	1980–1983, 1985–1987
Michael Tate	Labor	Tasmania	1988	1977–1993
Baden Teague	Liberal	South Australia	1991	1977–1996
Michael Townley	Liberal	Tasmania	1991	1970–1987
Jo Vallentine	NDP/Independent (Note: Jo Vallentine was elected as a Nuclear Disarmament Party member, but resigned in 1985 as the party collapsed amidst allegations of Socialist Workers Party entryism. She served out the remainder of her term as an independent, though she registered the Vallentine Peace Group as an electoral vehicle for her supporters.)	Western Australia	1988	1985–1992
Amanda Vanstone	Liberal	South Australia	1991	1984–2007
David Vigor	Democrats/Unite Australia	South Australia	1988 (Note: The 2nd non-sitting senator elected so term started on 1 December 1984 but 7th senator elected so term ended on 30 June 1988.)	1984–1987
Peter Walsh	Labor	Western Australia	1988	1974–1993
Shirley Walters	Liberal	Tasmania	1988	1975–1993
John Watson	Liberal	Tasmania	1991	1978–2008
Sue West	Labor	New South Wales	1988	1987, 1990–2002
Rt. Reg Withers	Liberal	Western Australia	1991	1966, 1967–1987
Olive Zakharov	Labor	Victoria	1991	1983–1995
