= Members of the Australian Senate, 1999–2002 =

Senate composition at 1 July 1999
Government (35) – (4 seat minority)
Liberal (31)
National Party (3)
Country Liberal (1)

Opposition (29)
Labor (29) (Note: Shayne Murphy resigned from the ALP on 2 October 2001 and served out the rest of his term as an independent.)

Crossbench (12)
Democrats (9)
Greens (1)
One Nation (1)
Independent (Harradine) (1)

Changes in composition

This is a list of members of the Australian Senate from 1999 to 2002. Half of the state senators had been elected at the March 1996 election and had terms due to finish on 30 June 2002; the other half of the state senators were elected at the October 1998 election and had terms due to finish on 30 June 2005. The territory senators were elected at the October 1998 election and their terms ended at the next federal election, which was November 2001.

Senator	Party	State	Term ending	Years in office
Eric Abetz	Liberal	Tasmania	2005	1994–2022
Lyn Allison	Democrats	Victoria	2002	1996–2008
Richard Alston	Liberal	Victoria	2002	1986–2004
Guy Barnett (Note: Liberal Senator Brian Gibson resigned in 2002. Guy Barnett was appointed as his replacement.)	Liberal	Tasmania	2005	2002–2011
Andrew Bartlett	Democrats	Queensland	2002	1997–2008, 2017–2018
Mark Bishop	Labor	Western Australia	2002	1996–2014
Nick Bolkus	Labor	South Australia	2005	1981–2005
Ron Boswell	National	Queensland	2002	1983–2014
Vicki Bourne	Democrats	New South Wales	2002	1996–2002
George Brandis (Note: Liberal Senator Warwick Parer resigned in 2000. George Brandis was appointed as his replacement on 16 May.)	Liberal	Queensland	2005	2000–2018
Bob Brown	Greens	Tasmania	2002	1996–2012
David Brownhill (Note: National Senator David Brownhill resigned in 2000. Former Senator Sandy Macdonald was appointed as his replacement on 4 May.)	National	New South Wales	2002	1984–2000
Geoff Buckland (Note: ALP Senator John Quirke resigned in 2000. Geoff Buckland was appointed as his replacement on 14 September.)	Labor	South Australia	2005	2000–2005
Paul Calvert	Liberal	Tasmania	2002	1987–2007
George Campbell	Labor	New South Wales	2002	1997–2008
Ian Campbell	Liberal	Western Australia	2005	1990–2007
Kim Carr	Labor	Victoria	2005	1993–2022
Grant Chapman	Liberal	South Australia	2002	1987–2008
John Cherry (Note: Democrat Senator John Woodley resigned in 2001. John Cherry was appointed as his replacement on 31 July.)	Democrats	Queensland	2005	2001–2005
Richard Colbeck (Note: Liberal Senator Jocelyn Newman resigned in 2002. Richard Colbeck was appointed as her replacement.)	Liberal	Tasmania	2002	2002–2016, 2018–present
Jacinta Collins	Labor	Victoria	2005	1995–2005, 2008–2019
Helen Coonan	Liberal	New South Wales	2002	1996–2011
Barney Cooney	Labor	Victoria	2002	1984–2002
Stephen Conroy	Labor	Victoria	2005	1996–2016
Peter Cook	Labor	Western Australia	2005	1983–2005
Winston Crane	Liberal	Western Australia	2002	1990–2002
Trish Crossin	Labor	Northern Territory	2001, 2004 (Note: The term of a territory senator ends at the dissolution of the House of Representatives, which was November 2001.)	1998–2013
Rosemary Crowley	Labor	South Australia	2002	1983–2002
Kay Denman	Labor	Tasmania	2005	1993–2005
Alan Eggleston	Liberal	Western Australia	2002	1996–2014
Chris Ellison	Liberal	Western Australia	2005	1993–2009
Chris Evans	Labor	Western Australia	2005	1993–2013
John Faulkner	Labor	New South Wales	2005	1989–2015
Alan Ferguson	Liberal	South Australia	2005	1992–2011
Jeannie Ferris	Liberal	South Australia	2002	1996–2007
Michael Forshaw	Labor	New South Wales	2005	1994–2011
Brenda Gibbs	Labor	Queensland	2002	1996–2002
Brian Gibson	Liberal	Tasmania	2005	1993–2002
Brian Greig	Democrats	Western Australia	2005	1999–2005
Brian Harradine (Note: Father of the Senate)	Independent	Tasmania	2005	1975–2005
Len Harris (Note: Heather Hill was initially elected as a One Nation Senator in Queensland, but she was declared ineligible as the citizen of a foreign power before she was able to take her seat. One Nation member Len Harris was subsequently elected on a recount.)	One Nation	Queensland	2005	1999–2005
Bill Heffernan	Liberal	New South Wales	2005	1996–2016
John Herron	Liberal	Queensland	2002	1990–2002
Robert Hill	Liberal	South Australia	2002	1981–2006
John Hogg	Labor	Queensland	2002	1996–2014
Steve Hutchins	Labor	New South Wales	2005	1999–2011
Rod Kemp	Liberal	Victoria	2002	1990–2008
Sue Knowles	Liberal	Western Australia	2005	1984–2005
Meg Lees	Democrats	South Australia	2005	1990–2005
Ross Lightfoot	Liberal	Western Australia	2002	1997–2008
Joe Ludwig	Labor	Queensland	2005	1999–2016
Kate Lundy	Labor	Australian Capital Territory	2001, 2004	1996–2015
Ian Macdonald	Liberal	Queensland	2002	1990–2019
Sandy Macdonald	National	New South Wales	2002	1993–1999, 2000–2008
Sue Mackay	Labor	Tasmania	2002	1996–2005
Brett Mason	Liberal	Queensland	2005	1999–2015
Julian McGauran	National	Victoria	2005	1987–1990, 1993–2011
Jim McKiernan	Labor	Western Australia	2002	1984–2002
Jan McLucas	Labor	Queensland	2005	1999–2016
Nick Minchin	Liberal	South Australia	2005	1993–2011
Shayne Murphy	Labor/Independent (Note: ALP Senator Shayne Murphy resigned from the party on 2 October 2001 and served out the rest of his term as an independent.)	Tasmania	2005	1993–2005
Andrew Murray	Democrats	Western Australia	2002	1996–2008
Jocelyn Newman	Liberal	Tasmania	2002	1986–2002
Kerry O'Brien	Labor	Tasmania	2005	1996–2011
Warwick Parer	Liberal	Queensland	2005	1984–2000
Kay Patterson	Liberal	Victoria	2002	1987–2008
Marise Payne	Liberal	New South Wales	2002	1997–2023
John Quirke	Labor	South Australia	2005	1997–2000
Robert Ray	Labor	Victoria	2002	1981–2008
Margaret Reid	Liberal	Australian Capital Territory	2001, 2004	1981–2003
Aden Ridgeway	Democrats	New South Wales	2005	1999–2005
Chris Schacht	Labor	South Australia	2002	1987–2002
Nigel Scullion (Note: The Country Liberal Party disendorsed Grant Tambling before the 2001 election, and Nigel Scullion was subsequently elected.)	Country Liberal	Northern Territory	2004	2001–2019
Nick Sherry	Labor	Tasmania	2002	1990–2012
Natasha Stott Despoja	Democrats	South Australia	2002	1995–2008
Grant Tambling	Country Liberal	Northern Territory	2001	1987–2001
Tsebin Tchen	Liberal	Victoria	2005	1999–2005
John Tierney	Liberal	New South Wales	2005	1991–2005
Judith Troeth	Liberal	Victoria	2005	1993–2011
Amanda Vanstone	Liberal	South Australia	2005	1984–2007
John Watson	Liberal	Tasmania	2002	1978–2008
Sue West	Labor	New South Wales	2002	1987, 1990–2002
John Woodley	Democrats	Queensland	2005	1993–2001
