= Members of the Australian Senate, 2002–2005 =

Senate composition at 1 July 2002
Government (35) – (4 seat minority)
Liberal (31)
National Party (3)
Country Liberal (1)

Opposition (28)
Labor (28)

Crossbench (13)
Democrats (8) (Note: Meg Lees resigned from the Democrats in July 2002 to sit as an independent. In April 2003, she founded the Australian Progressive Alliance)
Greens (2)
One Nation (1)
Independent (2) (Note: Shayne Murphy had resigned from the Labor Party on 2 October 2001 and served out the rest of his term as an independent.)

Changes in composition

This is a list of members of the Australian Senate from 1 July 2002 to 30 June 2005. Half of the state senators had been elected at the November 2001 election and had terms due to finish on 30 June 2008; the other half of the state senators had been elected at the October 1998 election and had terms due to finish on 30 June 2005. The territory senators were elected at the November 2001 election and their terms ended at the next federal election, which was October 2004.

Senator	Party	State	Term ending	Years in office
Eric Abetz	Liberal	Tasmania	2005	1994–2022
Lyn Allison	Democrats	Victoria	2008	1996–2008
Richard Alston (Note: Liberal Senator Richard Alston resigned in 2004. Mitch Fifield was appointed as his replacement on 31 March.)	Liberal	Victoria	2008	1986–2004
Guy Barnett	Liberal	Tasmania	2005	2002–2011
Andrew Bartlett	Democrats	Queensland	2008	1997–2008, 2017–2018
Mark Bishop	Labor	Western Australia	2008	1996–2014
Nick Bolkus	Labor	South Australia	2005	1981–2005
Ron Boswell	National	Queensland	2008	1983–2014
George Brandis	Liberal	Queensland	2005	2000–2018
Bob Brown	Greens	Tasmania	2008	1996–2012
Geoff Buckland	Labor	South Australia	2005	2000–2005
Paul Calvert	Liberal	Tasmania	2008	1987–2007
George Campbell	Labor	New South Wales	2008	1997–2008
Ian Campbell	Liberal	Western Australia	2005	1990–2007
Kim Carr	Labor	Victoria	2005	1993–2022
Grant Chapman	Liberal	South Australia	2008	1987–2008
John Cherry	Democrats	Queensland	2005	2001–2005
Richard Colbeck	Liberal	Tasmania	2008	2002–2016, 2018–present
Jacinta Collins	Labor	Victoria	2005	1995–2005, 2008–2019
Stephen Conroy	Labor	Victoria	2005	1996–2016
Peter Cook	Labor	Western Australia	2005	1983–2005
Helen Coonan	Liberal	New South Wales	2008	1996–2011
Trish Crossin	Labor	Northern Territory	2004, 2007 (Note: The term of a territory senator ends at the dissolution of the House of Representatives, which was October 2004.)	1998–2013
Kay Denman	Labor	Tasmania	2005	1993–2005
Alan Eggleston	Liberal	Western Australia	2008	1996–2014
Chris Ellison	Liberal	Western Australia	2005	1993–2009
Chris Evans	Labor	Western Australia	2005	1993–2013
John Faulkner	Labor	New South Wales	2005	1989–2015
Alan Ferguson	Liberal	South Australia	2005	1992–2011
Jeannie Ferris	Liberal	South Australia	2008	1996–2007
Concetta Fierravanti-Wells (Note: Liberal Senator John Tierney resigned in 2005. Concetta Fierravanti-Wells, who had already been elected as Tierney's replacement, but had not yet taken her seat, was appointed to the vacancy on 5 May 2015.)	Liberal	New South Wales	2005	2005–2022
Mitch Fifield	Liberal	Victoria	2008	2004–2019
Michael Forshaw	Labor	New South Wales	2005	1994–2011
Brian Greig	Democrats	Western Australia	2005	1999–2005
Brian Harradine (Note: Father of the Senate)	Independent	Tasmania	2005	1975–2005
Len Harris	One Nation	Queensland	2005	1999–2005
Bill Heffernan	Liberal	New South Wales	2005	1996–2016
John Herron (Note: Liberal Senator John Herron resigned in 2002. Santo Santoro was appointed as his replacement on 29 October.)	Liberal	Queensland	2008	1990–2002
Robert Hill	Liberal	South Australia	2008	1981–2006
John Hogg	Labor	Queensland	2008	1996–2014
Gary Humphries (Note: Liberal Senator Margaret Reid resigned in 2003. Gary Humphries was appointed as her replacement on 18 February.)	Liberal	Australian Capital Territory	2004, 2007	2003–2013
Steve Hutchins	Labor	New South Wales	2005	1999–2011
David Johnston	Liberal	Western Australia	2008	2002–2016
Rod Kemp	Liberal	Victoria	2008	1990–2008
Linda Kirk	Labor	South Australia	2008	2002–2008
Sue Knowles	Liberal	Western Australia	2005	1984–2005
Meg Lees	Dem/Ind/APA (Note: Meg Lees was elected as a member of the Australian Democrats, but resigned from the party in July 2002 to sit as an independent. In April 2003, she founded the Australian Progressive Alliance, and served as its only representative in parliament.)	South Australia	2005	1990–2005
Ross Lightfoot	Liberal	Western Australia	2008	1997–2008
Joe Ludwig	Labor	Queensland	2005	1999–2016
Kate Lundy	Labor	Australian Capital Territory	2004, 2007	1996–2015
Ian Macdonald	Liberal	Queensland	2008	1990–2019
Sandy Macdonald	National	New South Wales	2008	1993–1999, 2000–2008
Sue Mackay	Labor	Tasmania	2008	1996–2005
Gavin Marshall	Labor	Victoria	2008	2002–2019
Brett Mason	Liberal	Queensland	2005	1999–2015
Julian McGauran	National	Victoria	2005	1987–1990, 1993–2011
Jan McLucas	Labor	Queensland	2005	1999–2016
Nick Minchin	Liberal	South Australia	2005	1993–2011
Claire Moore	Labor	Queensland	2008	2002–2019
Shayne Murphy	Independent (Note: Shayne Murphy had resigned from the Labor Party on 2 October 2001 and served out the rest of his term as an independent.)	Tasmania	2005	1993–2005
Andrew Murray	Democrats	Western Australia	2008	1996–2008
Kerry Nettle	Greens	New South Wales	2008	2002–2008
Kerry O'Brien	Labor	Tasmania	2005	1996–2011
Kay Patterson	Liberal	Victoria	2008	1987–2008
Marise Payne	Liberal	New South Wales	2008	1997–2023
Robert Ray	Labor	Victoria	2008	1981–2008
Margaret Reid	Liberal	Australian Capital Territory	2004	1981–2003
Aden Ridgeway	Democrats	New South Wales	2005	1999–2005
Santo Santoro	Liberal	Queensland	2008	2002–2007
Nigel Scullion	Country Liberal	Northern Territory	2004, 2007	2001–2019
Nick Sherry	Labor	Tasmania	2008	1990–2012
Natasha Stott Despoja	Democrats	South Australia	2008	1995–2008
Ursula Stephens	Labor	New South Wales	2008	2002–2014
Tsebin Tchen	Liberal	Victoria	2005	1999–2005
John Tierney	Liberal	New South Wales	2005	1991–2005
Judith Troeth	Liberal	Victoria	2005	1993–2011
Amanda Vanstone	Liberal	South Australia	2005	1984–2007
John Watson	Liberal	Tasmania	2008	1978–2008
Ruth Webber	Labor	Western Australia	2008	2002–2008
Penny Wong	Labor	South Australia	2008	2002–present
