= Members of the Australian Senate, 1983–1985 =

Senate composition at 1 July 1983
Government (30)
Labor (30) - (3 seat minority)

Opposition (28)
Liberal (23)
National Party (4)
Country Liberal (1)

Crossbench (6)
Democrats (5)
Independent (Harradine) (1)

This is a list of members of the Australian Senate from 1983 to 1985. It consisted of ten senators for each of the six states of Australia and two senators representing each of the Northern Territory and the Australian Capital Territory. All members were elected at the 1983 election following a double dissolution of both houses of parliament, rather than the normal case of only half of the state senators facing election.

In accordance with section 13 of the Constitution, following a double dissolution of Parliament, the terms for senators commence on 1 July preceding the election – i.e., on 1 July 1982. The first five senators elected in each state were allocated the full six-year terms ending on 30 June 1988 while the other half were allocated three-year terms ending on 30 June 1985. Senators took their seats immediately following the election on 5 March 1983. The four territory senators were elected in March 1983 and their terms ended at the dissolution of the House of Representatives, which was December 1984.

| Senator | Party | State | Term ending | Years in office |
|---|---|---|---|---|
| Brian Archer | Liberal | Tasmania | 1985 | 1975–1994 |
| Peter Baume | Liberal | New South Wales | 1988 | 1974–1991 |
| Florence Bjelke-Petersen | National | Queensland | 1988 | 1980–1993 |
| Nick Bolkus | Labor | South Australia | 1985 | 1981–2005 |
| Ron Boswell | National | Queensland | 1985 | 1983–2014 |
| John Button | Labor | Victoria | 1988 | 1974–1993 |
| Sir John Carrick | Liberal | New South Wales | 1988 | 1970–1987 |
| Fred Chaney | Liberal | Western Australia | 1988 | 1974–1990 |
| Bruce Childs | Labor | New South Wales | 1985 | 1980–1997 |
| Don Chipp | Democrats | Victoria | 1988 | 1977–1986 |
| John Coates | Labor | Tasmania | 1985 | 1980–1996 |
| Ruth Coleman | Labor | Western Australia | 1988 | 1974–1987 |
| Stan Collard | National | Queensland | 1988 | 1975–1987 |
| Mal Colston | Labor | Queensland | 1988 | 1975–1999 |
| Peter Cook | Labor | Western Australia | 1985 | 1983–2005 |
| Noel Crichton-Browne | Liberal | Western Australia | 1985 | 1980–1996 |
| Rosemary Crowley | Labor | South Australia | 1985 | 1983–2002 |
| Peter Durack | Liberal | Western Australia | 1988 | 1970–1993 |
| Ron Elstob | Labor | South Australia | 1988 | 1977–1987 |
| Gareth Evans | Labor | Victoria | 1988 | 1977–1996 |
| Jack Evans | Democrats | Western Australia | 1985 | 1983–1985 |
| Dominic Foreman | Labor | South Australia | 1988 | 1980–1997 |
| George Georges | Labor | Queensland | 1988 | 1967–1987 |
| Arthur Gietzelt | Labor | New South Wales | 1988 | 1970–1989 |
| Patricia Giles | Labor | Western Australia | 1985 | 1980–1993 |
| Don Grimes | Labor | Tasmania | 1988 | 1974–1987 |
| Dame Margaret Guilfoyle | Liberal | Victoria | 1988 | 1970–1987 |
| Janine Haines | Democrats | South Australia | 1988 | 1977–1978, 1980–1990 |
| David Hamer | Liberal | Victoria | 1985 | 1977–1990 |
| Brian Harradine | Independent | Tasmania | 1988 | 1975–2005 |
| Jean Hearn | Labor | Tasmania | 1985 | 1980–1985 |
| Robert Hill | Liberal | South Australia | 1988 | 1981–2006 |
| Don Jessop | Liberal | South Australia | 1985 | 1970–1991 |
| Gerry Jones | Labor | Queensland | 1985 | 1980–1996 |
| Bernie Kilgariff | Country Liberal | Northern Territory | 1984, 1987 (Note: The term of a territory senator ends at the dissolution of the House of Representatives, which was December 1984.) | 1975–1987 |
| Misha Lajovic | Liberal | New South Wales | 1985 | 1975–1985 |
| Austin Lewis | Liberal | Victoria | 1988 | 1976–1993 |
| David MacGibbon | Liberal | Queensland | 1985 | 1977–1999 |
| Michael Macklin | Democrats | Queensland | 1985 | 1980–1990 |
| Graham Maguire | Labor | South Australia | 1985 | 1983–1993 |
| Kathy Martin (Note: Queensland Liberal Senator Kathy Martin resigned on 5 November 1984. Warwick Parer was appointed as her replacement on 22 November for a term ending 30 June 1988.) | Liberal | Queensland | 1988 | 1974–1984 |
| Colin Mason | Democrats | New South Wales | 1985 | 1977–1987 |
| Doug McClelland (Note: Father of the Senate) | Labor | New South Wales | 1988 | 1961–1987 |
| Gordon McIntosh | Labor | Western Australia | 1988 | 1974–1987 |
| Tony Messner | Liberal | South Australia | 1988 | 1975–1990 |
| Alan Missen | Liberal | Victoria | 1985 | 1974–1986 |
| Warwick Parer | Liberal | Queensland | 1988 | 1984–1999 |
| Cyril Primmer | Labor | Victoria | 1985 | 1971–1985 |
| Peter Rae | Liberal | Tasmania | 1988 | 1967–1986 |
| Robert Ray | Labor | Victoria | 1985 | 1981–2008 |
| Margaret Reid | Liberal | Australian Capital Territory | 1984, 1987 | 1981–2003 |
| Margaret Reynolds | Labor | Queensland | 1985 | 1983–1999 |
| Graham Richardson | Labor | New South Wales | 1988 | 1983–1994 |
| Ted Robertson | Labor | Northern Territory | 1984, 1987 | 1975–1987 |
| Susan Ryan | Labor | Australian Capital Territory | 1984, 1987 | 1975–1988 |
| Douglas Scott | National | New South Wales | 1985 | 1970, 1974–1985 |
| Kerry Sibraa | Labor | New South Wales | 1985 | 1975–1978, 1978–1994 |
| Michael Tate | Labor | Tasmania | 1988 | 1977–1993 |
| Baden Teague | Liberal | South Australia | 1985 | 1977–1996 |
| Michael Townley | Liberal | Tasmania | 1985 | 1970–1987 |
| Peter Walsh | Labor | Western Australia | 1988 | 1974–1993 |
| Shirley Walters | Liberal | Tasmania | 1988 | 1975–1993 |
| John Watson | Liberal | Tasmania | 1985 | 1978–2008 |
| Rt. Reg Withers | Liberal | Western Australia | 1985 | 1966, 1967–1987 |
| Olive Zakharov | Labor | Victoria | 1985 | 1983–1995 |
