= Members of the Australian Senate =

Following are lists of members of the Australian Senate:

- Members of the Australian Senate, 1901–1903
- Members of the Australian Senate, 1904–1906
- Members of the Australian Senate, 1907–1910
- Members of the Australian Senate, 1910–1913
- Members of the Australian Senate, 1913–1914
- Members of the Australian Senate, 1914–1917
- Members of the Australian Senate, 1917–1920
- Members of the Australian Senate, 1920–1923
- Members of the Australian Senate, 1923–1926
- Members of the Australian Senate, 1926–1929
- Members of the Australian Senate, 1929–1932
- Members of the Australian Senate, 1932–1935
- Members of the Australian Senate, 1935–1938
- Members of the Australian Senate, 1938–1941
- Members of the Australian Senate, 1941–1944
- Members of the Australian Senate, 1944–1947
- Members of the Australian Senate, 1947–1950
- Members of the Australian Senate, 1950–1951
- Members of the Australian Senate, 1951–1953 (terms deemed to have begun 1950)
- Members of the Australian Senate, 1953–1956
- Members of the Australian Senate, 1956–1959
- Members of the Australian Senate, 1959–1962
- Members of the Australian Senate, 1962–1965
- Members of the Australian Senate, 1965–1968
- Members of the Australian Senate, 1968–1971
- Members of the Australian Senate, 1971–1974
- Members of the Australian Senate, 1974–1975 (terms deemed to have begun 1973)
- Members of the Australian Senate, 1975–1978
- Members of the Australian Senate, 1978–1981
- Members of the Australian Senate, 1981–1983
- Members of the Australian Senate, 1983–1985 (terms deemed to have begun 1982)
- Members of the Australian Senate, 1985–1987
- Members of the Australian Senate, 1987–1990
- Members of the Australian Senate, 1990–1993
- Members of the Australian Senate, 1993–1996
- Members of the Australian Senate, 1996–1999
- Members of the Australian Senate, 1999–2002
- Members of the Australian Senate, 2002–2005
- Members of the Australian Senate, 2005–2008
- Members of the Australian Senate, 2008–2011
- Members of the Australian Senate, 2011–2014
- Members of the Australian Senate, 2014–2016
- Members of the Australian Senate, 2016–2019 (elected 2 July 2016, terms deemed to have begun on 1 July 2016)
- Members of the Australian Senate, 2019–2022
- Members of the Australian Senate, 2022–2025
- Members of the Australian Senate, 2025–2028
