= Members of the Australian Senate, 2005–2008 =

Senate composition at 1 July 2005
Government (39) – (1 seat majority)
Liberal (33)
National Party (5)
Country Liberal (1)

Opposition (28)
Labor (28)

Crossbench (9)
Greens (4)
Democrats (4)
Family First (1)

This is a list of members of the Australian Senate from 1 July 2005 to 30 June 2008. Half of the state senators had been elected at the November 2001 election and had terms due to finish on 30 June 2008; the other half of the state senators were elected at the October 2004 election and had terms due to finish on 30 June 2011. The territory senators were elected at the October 2004 election and their terms ended at the next federal election, which was November 2007. The new Senate first met in August 2005, with state senators elected in 2004 sworn in on 9 August 2005.

This election was the beginning of the end for the Australian Democrats, in that while they still had 4 senators from the 2001 election, they failed to win a single senate seat at the 2004 election and have not won a senate seat since.

Senator	Party	State	Term ending	Years in office
Eric Abetz	Liberal	Tasmania	2011	1994–2022
Judith Adams	Liberal	Western Australia	2011	2005–2012
Lyn Allison	Democrats	Victoria	2008	1996–2008
Guy Barnett	Liberal	Tasmania	2011	2002–2011
Andrew Bartlett	Democrats	Queensland	2008	1997–2008, 2017–2018
Cory Bernardi (Note: South Australian Liberal Senator Robert Hill resigned on 2 March 2006 to take up a position as Australian Ambassador to the United Nations. Cory Bernardi was appointed as his replacement on 4 May.)	Liberal	South Australia	2008	2006–2020
Simon Birmingham (Note: South Australian Liberal Senator Jeannie Ferris died on 1 April 2007. Simon Birmingham was appointed as her replacement on 3 May.)	Liberal	South Australia	2008	2007–2025
Mark Bishop	Labor	Western Australia	2008	1996–2014
Ron Boswell	National	Queensland	2008	1983–2014
Sue Boyce (Note: Queensland Liberal Senator Santo Santoro resigned on 11 April 2007. Sue Boyce was appointed as his replacement on 20 April.)	Liberal	Queensland	2008	2007–2014
George Brandis	Liberal	Queensland	2011	2000–2018
Bob Brown	Greens	Tasmania	2008	1996–2012
Carol Brown (Note: Tasmanian ALP Senator Sue Mackay resigned on 30 July 2005. Carol Brown was appointed as her replacement on 25 August.)	Labor	Tasmania	2008	2005–present
David Bushby (Note: Tasmanian Liberal Senator Paul Calvert resigned on 29 August 2007. David Bushby was appointed as his replacement on 30 August.)	Liberal	Tasmania	2008	2007–2019
Paul Calvert	Liberal	Tasmania	2008	1987–2007
George Campbell	Labor	New South Wales	2008	1997–2008
Ian Campbell (Note: Western Australian Liberal Senator Ian Campbell resigned on 31 May 2007. Mathias Cormann was appointed as his replacement on 19 June.)	Liberal	Western Australia	2011	1990–2007
Kim Carr	Labor	Victoria	2011	1993–2022
Grant Chapman	Liberal	South Australia	2008	1987–2008
Richard Colbeck	Liberal	Tasmania	2008	2002–2016, 2018–present
Jacinta Collins (Note: Victorian ALP Senator Robert Ray resigned on 5 May 2008. Jacinta Collins was appointed as his replacement on 8 May.)	Labor	Victoria	2008	1995–2005, 2008–2019
Stephen Conroy	Labor	Victoria	2011	1996–2016
Helen Coonan	Liberal	New South Wales	2008	1996–2011
Mathias Cormann	Liberal	Western Australia	2011	2007–2020
Trish Crossin	Labor	Northern Territory	2007, 2010 (Note: The term of a territory senator ends at the dissolution of the House of Representatives, which was November 2007.)	1998–2013
Alan Eggleston	Liberal	Western Australia	2008	1996–2014
Chris Ellison	Liberal	Western Australia	2011	1993–2009
Chris Evans	Labor	Western Australia	2011	1993–2013
John Faulkner	Labor	New South Wales	2011	1989–2015
Alan Ferguson	Liberal	South Australia	2011	1992–2011
Jeannie Ferris	Liberal	South Australia	2008	1996–2007
Steve Fielding	Family First	Victoria	2011	2005–2011
Concetta Fierravanti-Wells	Liberal	New South Wales	2011	2005–2022
Mitch Fifield	Liberal	Victoria	2008	2004–2019
Mary Jo Fisher (Note: South Australian Liberal Senator Amanda Vanstone resigned on 26 April 2007. Mary Jo Fisher was appointed as her replacement on 6 June.)	Liberal	South Australia	2011	2007–2012
Michael Forshaw	Labor	New South Wales	2011	1994–2011
Bill Heffernan	Liberal	New South Wales	2011	1996–2016
Robert Hill	Liberal	South Australia	2008	1981–2006
John Hogg	Labor	Queensland	2008	1996–2014
Gary Humphries	Liberal	Australian Capital Territory	2007, 2010	2003–2013
Annette Hurley	Labor	South Australia	2011	2005–2011
Steve Hutchins	Labor	New South Wales	2011	1999–2011
David Johnston	Liberal	Western Australia	2008	2002–2016
Barnaby Joyce	National	Queensland	2011	2005–2013
Rod Kemp	Liberal	Victoria	2008	1990–2008
Linda Kirk	Labor	South Australia	2008	2002–2008
Ross Lightfoot	Liberal	Western Australia	2008	1997–2008
Joe Ludwig	Labor	Queensland	2011	1999–2016
Kate Lundy	Labor	Australian Capital Territory	2007, 2010	1996–2015
Ian Macdonald	Liberal	Queensland	2008	1990–2019
Sandy Macdonald	National	New South Wales	2008	1993–1999, 2000–2008
Sue Mackay	Labor	Tasmania	2008	1996–2005
Gavin Marshall	Labor	Victoria	2008	2002–2019
Brett Mason	Liberal	Queensland	2011	1999–2015
Anne McEwen	Labor	South Australia	2011	2005–2016
Julian McGauran	National/Liberal (Note: Victorian Senator Julian McGauran was elected as a National Party member, but defected to the Liberal Party on 23 January 2006.)	Victoria	2011	1987–1990, 1993–2011
Jan McLucas	Labor	Queensland	2011	1999–2016
Christine Milne	Greens	Tasmania	2011	2005–2015
Nick Minchin	Liberal	South Australia	2011	1993–2011
Claire Moore	Labor	Queensland	2008	2002–2019
Andrew Murray	Democrats	Western Australia	2008	1996–2008
Fiona Nash	National	New South Wales	2011	2005–2017
Kerry Nettle	Greens	New South Wales	2008	2002–2008
Kerry O'Brien	Labor	Tasmania	2011	1996–2011
Stephen Parry	Liberal	Tasmania	2011	2005–2017
Kay Patterson	Liberal	Victoria	2008	1987–2008
Marise Payne	Liberal	New South Wales	2008	1997–2023
Helen Polley	Labor	Tasmania	2011	2005–present
Robert Ray	Labor	Victoria	2008	1981–2008
Michael Ronaldson	Liberal	Victoria	2011	2005–2016
Santo Santoro	Liberal	Queensland	2008	2002–2007
Nigel Scullion	Country Liberal (Note: Northern Territory Senator Nigel Scullion was elected as a candidate of the Country Liberal Party, which is the equivalent of both the Nationals and Liberals in the Northern Territory. He sat with the Nationals and since 3 December 2007 he served as that party's deputy leader & Senate leader.)	Northern Territory	2007, 2010	2001–2019
Nick Sherry	Labor	Tasmania	2008	1990–2012
Rachel Siewert	Greens	Western Australia	2011	2005–2021
Ursula Stephens	Labor	New South Wales	2008	2002–2014
Glenn Sterle	Labor	Western Australia	2011	2005–present
Natasha Stott Despoja	Democrats	South Australia	2008	1995–2008
Judith Troeth	Liberal	Victoria	2011	1993–2011
Russell Trood	Liberal	Queensland	2011	2005–2011
Amanda Vanstone	Liberal	South Australia	2011	1984–2007
John Watson	Liberal	Tasmania	2008	1978–2008
Ruth Webber	Labor	Western Australia	2008	2002–2008
Penny Wong	Labor	South Australia	2008	2002–present
Dana Wortley	Labor	South Australia	2011	2005–2011
