= Arthur Devlin =

Arthur Devlin may refer to:

- Art Devlin (baseball) (1879–1948), American athlete and coach
- Art Devlin (ski jumper) (1922–2004), American ski jumper
- Ray Devlin (Arthur Ray Devlin, 1926–1995), Australian politician
