= Aulich =

Aulich is a surname. Notable people with the surname include:

- Lajos Aulich (1793–1849), Hungarian soldier
- Terry Aulich (born 1945), Australian politician
