= Helen Polley =

Australian politician

Senator Helen Polley
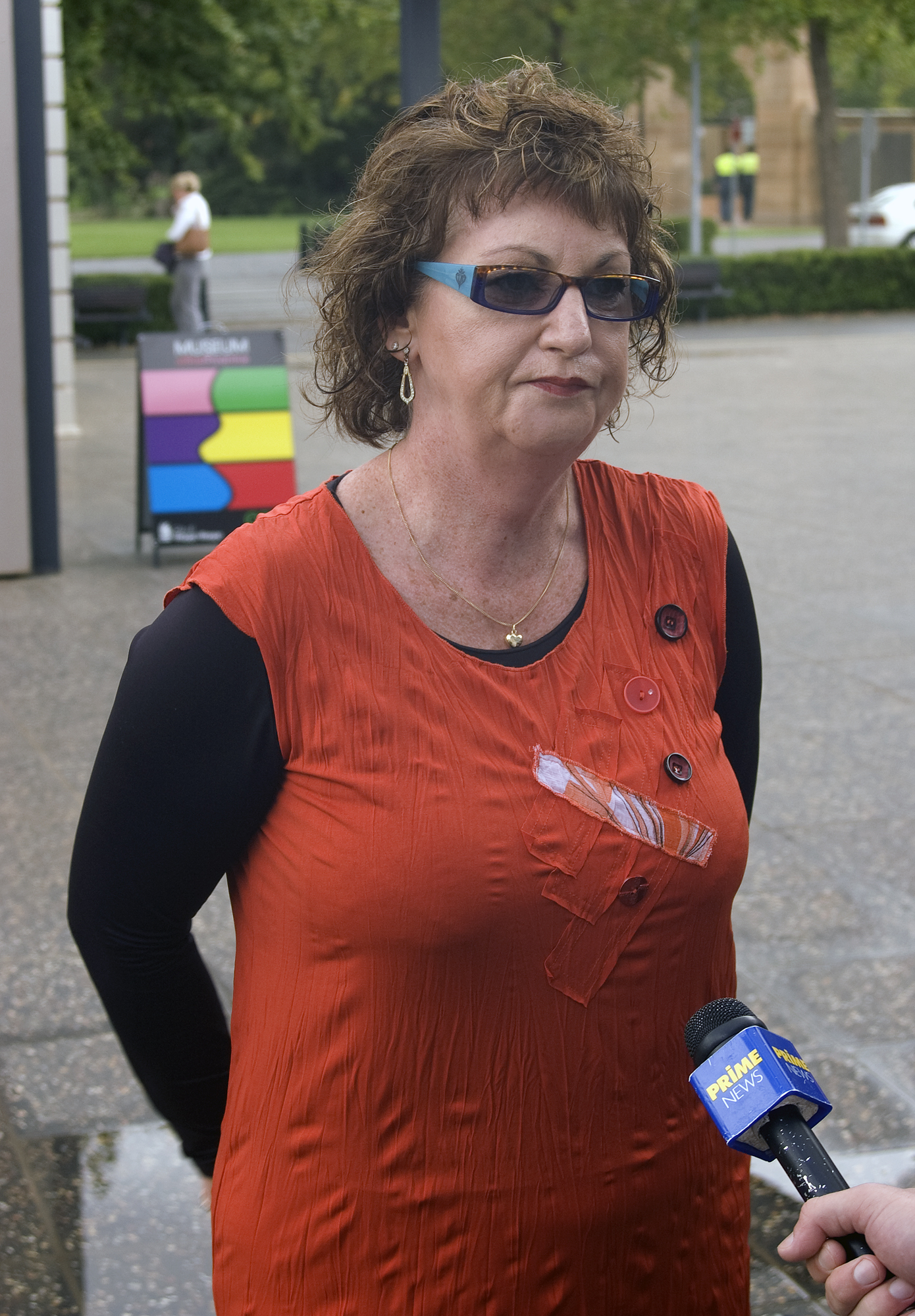
- Polley in 2010

Senator for Tasmania
- Incumbent
- Assumed office 1 July 2005

Personal details
- Born: 9 February 1957 (age 69) Ulverstone, Tasmania, Australia
- Party: Australian Labor Party
- Relations: Michael Polley
- Profession: Political adviser Politician

Helen Beatrice Polley (born 9 February 1957) is an Australian politician. A member of the Australian Labor Party, she has served as a member of the Australian Senate representing Tasmania since 1 July 2005.

== Early life and education ==
Born in Ulverstone, Tasmania, Polley is the daughter of Michael and Eileen Polley, and the sister of Michael Polley, former Speaker of the Tasmanian House of Assembly. She was educated at Deloraine High School, Launceston Community College and Launceston Business College, where she obtained a Diploma of Business Administration.

Senator Polley started work in administrative roles and work in finance, transport and manufacturing.

== Political career ==
=== Early career (1984–2005) ===
Polley spent time working as an adviser to Senator Terry Aulich from 1984 to 1992, Premier Michael Field from 1992 to 1995, Senator Shayne Murphy from 1995 to 1998, and Premiers Jim Bacon from 1998 to 2004 and Paul Lennon from 2004 to 2005.

She was also the first female President of the Tasmanian branch of the ALP from 1992 to 1995, before being elected as Senator for Tasmania at the 2004 Federal Election.

=== Australian Senate (2005–present) ===
Polley took up her position on 1 July 2005 and retained her Senate seat at the 2010 and 2016 Federal Elections.

Polley is a committee member of the Joint Committee on the National Broadband Network and Law Enforcement – Parliamentary Joint Committee.

Polley served as Deputy Government Whip in the Senate in the Second Gillard Ministry and Second Rudd Ministry from 2010 to 2013, and then as Parliamentary Secretary for Aged Care from 2013 to 2016.

=== Comcare Investigation ===
Following several staff alleging harassment and abuse by Polley, Commonwealth workplace health and safety agency Comcare commenced an investigation. The investigation found Polley's office had an unhealthy workplace culture that had "an adverse impact on the morale, health and well-being" of staff. Several staff had compensation claims approved for damages resulting from the bullying endured during their time working for Polley.

=== Travel expenditure ===
In 2014, Polley admitted to spending about $23,000 of taxpayer money on chartered flights between Hobart and Launceston, each lasting about 35 minutes. According to Polley this was within the entitlements of all Senators of Australia depending on their geographical location.

=== Use of "All lives matter" slogan ===
In 2020, Polley apologised after sharing the a variation of the All Lives Matter slogan that said "Instead of Black Lives Matter how about every life matters no matter what the color of your skin is", on social media in an incident that she acknowledged was "careless" and "insensitive". She claimed that she had been unaware of the issues with the slogan.

== Political views ==
Polley is a member of Labor's Right faction. She is a member of the Australian Workers' Union (AWU), and is linked with the Shop, Distributive and Allied Employees Association (SDA).

Polley opposes same-sex marriage and voted against the Marriage Amendment Act 2017 following the Australian Marriage Law Postal Survey.

Polley opposes abortion. In 2006, Polley voted against the Therapeutic Goods Amendment Bill that would provide for medical abortions. Speaking against the Bill, Polley said:

"I dread to think that this chamber might very well be condemning our daughters to a horrible death or complications that may remove the opportunity for them to ever conceive again."

Senator Polley opposes euthanasia and the ability of the Northern Territory and Australian Capital Territory governments to legislate on the matter. Polley argues "...legislation will never be able to guarantee that a human life will not be prematurely ended due to abuse or flaws within such a legislative framework", and where assisted dying has been legalised "life has been extinguished prematurely and without the consent of the person. Effectively, in many jurisdictions the state is killing people where voluntary euthanasia laws have been established."
