= Ray Devlin =

Australian politician

Senator for Tasmania
- In office 1 December 1984 – 30 June 1990

Personal details
- Born: 17 March 1926 Burnie, Tasmania, Australia
- Died: 17 May 1995 (aged 69) Burnie, Tasmania, Australia
- Party: Labor
- Occupation: Waterside worker

Arthur Ray Devlin (17 March 1926 – 17 May 1995) was an Australian trade unionist and politician. He was a Senator for Tasmania from 1984 to 1990, representing the Australian Labor Party (ALP). He was a waterside worker from Burnie, Tasmania, before entering politics and served as secretary of the Burnie Trades and Labour Council from 1966 to 1993.

== Early life ==
Devlin was born on 17 March 1926 in Burnie, Tasmania. He was one of eight children born to Sarah Ellen (née Holmyard) and Llewellyn Max Devlin; his father was a waterside worker.

Devlin attended Burnie State School. He left school at the age of 14 and began working at the Electrolytic Zinc Company's Hercules mine near Williamsford. He later worked for the Postmaster-General's Department and then in 1950 joined his father working on the Burnie waterfront.

== Labour movement ==
Devlin was active in the Waterside Workers' Federation of Australia and in 1966 was elected honorary secretary of the Burnie Trades and Labour Council (BTLC). He and the BTLC supported industrial action on several occasions, including a fuel boycott of the Ringarooma Tin Mining Company in 1974 and 1975 and a strike at EZ's Rosebery mine in 1983. He was also involved in disputes at Luina, Renison Bell and Savage River.

Devlin sought to preserve the BTLC's independence and in 1968 declined to join the new Hobart-based Tasmanian Trades and Labor Council. He subsequently clashed with the TTLC's leader Brian Harradine, who established the Burnie Trades Union Council as a rival body. Devlin and the BTLC subsequently aligned with the new Tasmanian Trade Union Council headed by John Devereux. The situation was resolved in the early 1980s via ACTU mediation and Devlin later served alongside Harradine and Devereux in the Senate.

== Politics ==
Devlin joined the ALP at a young age and served as secretary of the party's Emu Bay branch. He was elected to the ALP state executive in 1973 and was aligned with the party's left faction.

At the 1984 federal election, Devlin was elected to a six-year Senate term running second on the ALP's ticket in Tasmania. His term was cut short by a double dissolution and he was re-elected to a further three-year term at the 1987 election, placed fourth on the ticket. He retired at the expiry of his term on 30 June 1990, in accordance with the ALP's age limit on candidates that prevented him seeking preselection at the 1990 election.

Devlin's maiden speech to the Senate in 1985 focused on waterside workers' issues, including the loss of jobs to new technologies, industrial safety, and insecure employment. He noted that his brother had been killed in an industrial accident earlier in the year. Devlin served on several Senate committees, including as chair of the Select Committee on Animal Welfare from 1989 to 1990. He regularly spoke on veterans' issues, including compensation for prisoners of war and support for wounded servicemen. He supported the expansion of the Tasmanian forestry industry, a divisive issue in the ALP, and the opening of the Wesley Vale pulp mill, citing its employment benefits.

In 1988, it was reported that Devlin had continued to live in subsidised public housing in Burnie while in the Senate, paying less than $4,000 per year in rent while earning a household income of over $80,000. In response Devlin stated that he had lived in the housing unit for twelve years and had unsuccessfully offered to buy the unit from the government on several occasions.

== Personal life ==
Devlin had one son from his first marriage to Rae Summers and two step-children from his second marriage to Vurlie. He was an amateur boxer and boxing coach and played for the Montello and Burnie Football Clubs. He was also a boundary umpire in the North West Football Union.

Devlin died of cancer in Burnie on 17 May 1995, aged 69.
