= Jean Hearn =

Australian politician and trade unionist

Senator for Tasmania
- In office 15 October 1980 – 30 June 1985
- Preceded by: Ken Wriedt

Personal details
- Born: Jean Margaret Button; 30 March 1921 Launceston, Tasmania, Australia
- Died: 20 November 2017 (aged 96)
- Party: Labor

Jean Margaret Hearn (30 March 1921 – 20 November 2017) was an Australian Senator and trade unionist. Hearn was appointed to the Senate on 15 October 1980 as a representative from Tasmania. She was the first woman from the Australian Labor Party to represent Tasmania in the Senate.

== Biography ==
Hearn née Button was born on 30 March 1921 in Launceston, Tasmania. She attended Methodist Ladies' College. In 1940 she married Frederick William Howe with whom she had one child. Howe died in a P.O.W. camp in Java, Indonesia. Hearne married Alfred Hearn in 1948 with whom she had three children.

Hearn was a pacifist. She died on 20 November 2017. She was a member of the Religious Society of Friends and the Australian Anthroposophical Society. In 1954 she joined the Australian Labor Party, serving on the Tasmanian Labor's State Administrative Committee from 1970 through 1980. In 1980 she was appointed to fill a vacant Senate seat, becoming the first woman ALP senator from Tasmania. She was elected to two more terms. She retired on 30 June 1985.

In 2015 Hearn established the Tamar Community Peace Trust. She died in November 2017.
