= Geoff Buckland =

Australian politician

Senator for South Australia
- In office 12 October 2000 – 30 June 2005
- Preceded by: John Quirke

Personal details
- Born: 10 November 1947 (age 78) Sydney, New South Wales, Australia
- Party: Labor

Geoffrey Frederick Buckland (born 10 November 1947), was an Australian Labor Party member of the Australian Senate from 2000 to 2005, representing the state of South Australia. Buckland was selected by the Parliament of South Australia to fill the Senate seat left vacant after the resignation of John Quirke under Section 15 of the Australian Constitution. He was born in Sydney, New South Wales, and was blast furnace operator, and an official with the Federated Ironworkers' Association and later the Whyalla-Woomera Branch Secretary of the Australian Workers' Union before entering politics.

Buckland did not contest the 2004 election. His term expired on 30 June 2005.
