= Carol Brown (politician) =

Australian politician (born 1963)

Senator The Honourable Carol Brown
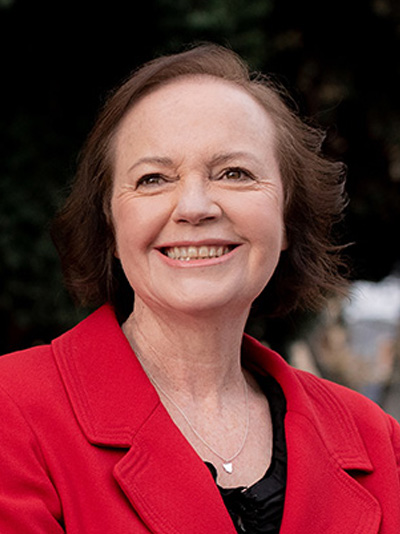
- Brown in 2022

Assistant Minister for Infrastructure and Transport
- In office 1 June 2022 – 29 July 2024
- Prime Minister: Anthony Albanese
- Minister: Catherine King

Senator for Tasmania
- Incumbent
- Assumed office 25 August 2005
- Preceded by: Sue Mackay

Personal details
- Born: 19 July 1963 (age 63) Hobart, Tasmania, Australia
- Party: Australian Labor Party
- Relations: Allison Ritchie (niece); Meg Brown (niece)
- Occupation: Political adviser Public servant

Carol Louise Brown (born 19 July 1963) is an Australian politician. She is a member of the Australian Labor Party (ALP) and has been a Senator for Tasmania since 2005. She was an assistant minister in the Albanese government from 2022 to 2024.

== Early life ==
Brown was born in Hobart, Tasmania. She is the eighth of thirteen children born to Julia and Rex Brown. In her maiden speech she recalled "a proud history, on both sides of my family, of union and Labor activism". Her great-grandmother Mary Butler was a founding member of the Hobart branch of the ALP, her uncle Leo Brown was state president of the ALP, one niece (Allison Ritchie) served in the Tasmanian Legislative Council, and another niece (Meg Brown) is currently a member of the Tasmanian House of Assembly.

Brown grew up in the suburb of Warrane. She joined the ALP at a young age and worked as an administrative officer with the party from 1984 to 1996. She later worked as an adviser to Senator Sue Mackay (1996–1998) and then held various positions with the Tasmanian state government, including portfolio services manager within the Department of Premier and Cabinet (1998–2002), office manager for the Minister for Primary Industries, Water and Environment (2002–2004), and office manager for the Minister for Infrastructure, Energy and Resources (2004–2005). She served as an assistant secretary of the Tasmanian Labor Party and acted as state secretary in 2000.

== Senate ==
Brown was appointed to the Senate on 25 August 2005 to fill a casual vacancy caused by the resignation of Sue Mackay. She was elected in her own right at the 2007 federal election and re-elected in 2013, 2016, 2019 and 2025. She is a member of the ALP's left faction.

Brown was elected Deputy Government Whip following the 2010 election. Following the 2013 election she was added to Bill Shorten's shadow ministry as a shadow parliamentary secretary. She was promoted to Shadow Minister for Disability and Carers in 2016, but in 2019 was returned to the rank of shadow assistant minister.

With Labor winning government in the 2022 federal election, Brown was appointed Assistant Minister for Infrastructure and Transport in the Albanese government. In July 2024, she announced she would step down from the assistant ministry for health reasons, with effect from 29 July 2024. In August 2024 she was appointed chair of the Joint Standing Committee on Electoral Matters.
