= Kerry Sibraa =

Australian politician

The Honourable Kerry Sibraa AO

President of the Senate
- In office 17 February 1987 – 31 January 1994
- Preceded by: Doug McClelland
- Succeeded by: Michael Beahan

Senator for New South Wales
- In office 13 December 1975 – 30 June 1978
- In office 9 August 1978 – 1 February 1994
- Preceded by: Jim McClelland
- Succeeded by: Belinda Neal

Personal details
- Born: 12 October 1937 (age 89) Sydney, New South Wales, Australia
- Party: Labor
- Spouse(s): Yvonne Melvin (m. 1957; div. 1992) Julie Hatcher (m. 1993)
- Occupation: Clerk; Trade unionist

Kerry Walter Sibraa AO (born 12 October 1937) is an Australian former politician. He was a Senator for New South Wales from 1975 to 1994, representing the Australian Labor Party (ALP), and served as President of the Senate from 1987 to 1994.

== Early life ==
Sibraa was born in Sydney on 12 October 1937. He was the son of Edna May (née Williams) and Arthur Francis Sibraa.

Sibraa's father worked as a schoolteacher in country New South Wales and he moved frequently as a child, attending schools at Condobolin, Ungarie, Shortland and Newcastle. He began his secondary education at Newcastle Boys High School and completed it at North Sydney Boys High School and Manly Boys High School when his family moved back to Sydney.

Sibraa left school after completing his Intermediate Certificate and subsequently worked as a clerk at the Metropolitan Water Sewerage and Drainage Board and at Manly Municipal Council. He was an officeholder in the Municipal and Shire Council Employees' Union and was also a co-founder of the Mackellar County Council Employees' Credit Union.

== Politics ==
=== Early involvement ===
Sibraa joined the ALP in 1960 as a member of its Narrabeen branch and first stood for parliament at the 1966 federal election, standing unsuccessfully for the safe Liberal seat of Wentworth. He subsequently began working full-time for the ALP, including as a paid organiser (1969–1971), administrative officer (1971–1973), and assistant general secretary (1973–1975). He was active in the Labor Right faction associated with state president John Ducker and federal MP Paul Keating.

=== Senate ===
Sibraa served as a Senator for from 13 December 1975 to 30 June 1978, and then again from 9 August 1978 until 1 February 1994, and was President of the Senate from 17 February 1987 to 31 January 1994. According to an article by C. J. Coventry, Sibraa had been an informer for the U.S.

== Later activities ==
After leaving Parliament, Sibraa was the Australian High Commissioner to Zimbabwe from March 1994 until February 1998. On 26 January 1997 Sibraa was made an Officer of the Order of Australia "for service to the Parliament of Australia, to international relations and to the community." On 1 January 2001 he was awarded the Centenary Medal.

Sibraa was a special counsel for the public relations and government relations firm Wells Haslem.

== Personal life ==
In 1957, Sibraa married Yvonne Melvin, with whom he had two children. They divorced in 1992 and the following year he married Julie Hatcher.

Parliament of Australia
Preceded by Doug McClelland	President of the Australian Senate; 1987–1994	Succeeded by Michael Beahan
Diplomatic posts
Preceded by J.D. Thwaites	Australian High Commissioner to Zimbabwe; 1994–1998	Succeeded by Denise Fisher
