= Shirley Walters =

Australian politician (1925–2017)

Senator for Tasmania
- In office 13 December 1975 – 30 June 1993

Personal details
- Born: Mary Shirley Harrison; 31 August 1925 Sydney, New South Wales, Australia
- Died: 18 June 2017 (aged 91) Hobart, Tasmania, Australia
- Party: Liberal
- Spouse: David Walters (m. 1949–2009)
- Relations: Sir Eric Harrison (father)

Mary Shirley Walters (née Harrison; 31 August 1925 – 18 June 2017) was an Australian politician who served as a Senator for Tasmania from 1975 to 1993, representing the Liberal Party. She was the first woman to represent Tasmania in the Senate, and was known for her social conservatism.

== Early life ==
Mary Shirley Harrison was born in Sydney, New South Wales, to Eric John Harrison and the former Mary Cook McCall. Her father was also a politician, serving as a government minister under Robert Menzies and later as High Commissioner to the United Kingdom. Her mother died in 1941 (when she was 15), and her father remarried a few years later. Harrison and her two sisters grew up in Rose Bay, and attended Kambala School. She became an accounts clerk with the Rural Bank of New South Wales after leaving school, but later trained as a nurse and began working at Royal Prince Alfred Hospital (RPA). In 1949, Harrison married obstetrician David Walters, whom she had first met in high school. They moved to Hobart, Tasmania, after he had completed his residency at RPA, and had four children together.

== Public life ==
Walters had been required to give up nursing when she married, but returned to the profession once her children were older and became a senior nurse at St John's Hospital, South Hobart. She was a member of the state committee of the National Trust, and was prominent in the Right to Life Association. In 1975, she represented the RLA at a women's health conference at the University of Queensland; her advocacy of conservatism in sex education brought her to the attention of the public.

=== Senator for Tasmania ===
Walters was elected to the Senate at the December 1975 federal election, which followed the dismissal of the Whitlam government. She was placed fifth on the Liberal Party ticket, defeating two sitting senators (Eric Bessell and John Marriott) for preselection. She became the first woman to represent Tasmania in the Senate, and only the second Tasmanian woman elected to parliament as a whole (after Enid Lyons, MHR 1943–1951). Walters was re-elected to the Senate in 1977, 1983, and 1987, in each occasion placed either first or second on the ticket. She announced her retirement in September 1991, with her final term ending in June 1993.

== Later life ==
Walters remained involved in the Liberal Party's organisational wing after her retirement from the Senate, and in 2003 was awarded life membership. She died in June 2017, aged 91.

== See also ==
- Women in the Australian Senate
