= Peter Rae =

Australian politician

The Honourable Peter Rae AO
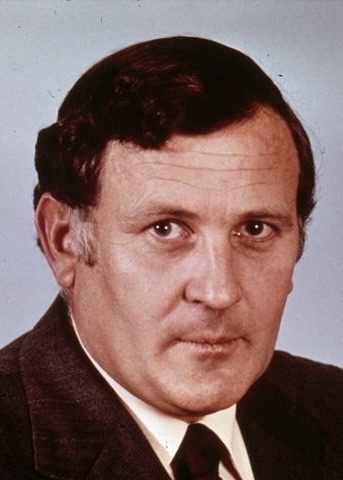
- Rae in 1975

Senator for Tasmania
- In office 1 July 1968 – 16 January 1986
- Succeeded by: Jocelyn Newman

Personal details
- Born: 24 September 1932 (age 93) Launceston, Tasmania
- Party: Liberal

Peter Elliot Rae AO (born 24 September 1932, Launceston, Tasmania) is a retired Australian politician who represented the Liberal Party for the state of Tasmania in the Australian Senate. He served as a Senator from 1967 until his resignation in January 1986. He was subsequently elected to the division of Bass in the Tasmanian House of Assembly at the February 1986 election, serving until his defeat on 13 May 1989.

== Career ==
Rae served as a Shadow Minister under Billy Snedden with portfolios that included Industry and Commerce, Finance, and Education and Science. As of 2026, Rae is the only living former parliamentarian who served on the Liberal frontbench prior to 1975.

Rae led a four-year investigation of the capital markets of Australia, particularly the Stock Exchanges. The "Rae Report" led to what became the Australian Securities and Investments Commission. He was a leader of several delegations to the European Parliament, the Council of Europe and NATO.

Rae worked to amend the Constitution Alteration (Senate Casual Vacancies) Bill 1977 to provide for direct election of replacement senators by Tasmanian-style countback, instead of the indirect party political appointment system that was eventually instituted.

Following his legislative career, Rae practised law at Rae & Partners law firm in Tasmania. From 1993-2004 he served as Chair of the Hydro-Electric Commission.

In 1999 Rae was made an Officer of the Order of Australia "for service to business and commerce, to the Federal and Tasmanian Parliaments, and to the Aboriginal community of Flinders Island."

In November 2003, Rae became Vice President of the World Wind Energy Association and became President in October 2015. Rae is Honorary Chairman of the International Renewable Energy Alliance (REN Alliance) the global alliance of renewable energy associations (bioenergy, hydro, wind, solar and geothermal). He is on the Board of several other Alliance partners.

He chaired sessions of the World Energy Conference in 2004 and was a keynote speaker at the National Business Leaders Forum on Sustainable Development.

He was an invited industry delegate to the inaugural International Renewable Energy Conference in Bonn in 2004 and was a member of the United Nations Expert Group as a Lead Reviewer and keynote speaker for the Beijing International Renewable Energy Conference in 2005. He participated in the 2008 Washington Conference as a side event moderator and was a member of the group organising the 2010 Delhi Conference.

Peter Rae attended COP meetings from 2000 to 2007, mostly as a member of the Australian delegation. He participated in the 2009 Copenhagen Conference where he chaired a joint side event with the International Renewable Energy Alliance (REN Alliance) and the newly formed International Renewable Energy Agency (IRENA).

He was Vice Chairman of REN21 (2008-2013) and is a member of the International Jury of the Energy Globe Sustainability Awards.

He was leader of the Renewable Energy industry delegation to the 14th and 15th sessions of the UN Commission on Sustainable Development (CSD) in New York. He was the moderator for the Renewable Energy side event at the CSD.

Peter Rae is member of the Honorary Board of the Energy Globe Foundation, representing Australia and the category YOUTH for the Annual Energy Globe World Award. The Award is the most prestigious environmental Award in over 180 countries.

On 4 June 1991 he was granted the right to use the term "The Honourable" for life.
