= Brian Gibson (politician) =

Australian politician and businessman

The Honourable Brian Gibson AM

Senator for Tasmania
- In office 1 July 1993 – 22 February 2002
- Succeeded by: Guy Barnett

Personal details
- Born: Brian Francis Gibson; 4 November 1936 Ascot Vale, Victoria, Australia
- Died: 15 August 2017 (aged 80) South Hobart, Tasmania, Australia
- Party: Liberal
- Spouse: Pauline James
- Occupation: Politician, businessman

Brian Francis Gibson AM (4 November 1936 – 15 August 2017) was an Australian politician and businessman who held senior appointments in Australian companies and industry bodies.

Gibson had a career in business that included being Managing Director of Australian Newsprint Mills from 1980 to 1983, and chairman of the Hydro-Electric Commission of Tasmania from 1989 to 1993. He was also National President of the forest industry peak representative body, the National Association of Forest Industries, from 1987 to 1991.

Gibson was elected to the Australian Senate at the 1993 election, as a member of the Liberal Party of Australia representing the state of Tasmania. After the 1996 election, Gibson was appointed as Parliamentary Secretary to the Treasurer. However, following concerns raised regarding a conflict of interest, he lost the portfolio from 15 October 1996 and did not hold a further ministerial position.

Gibson was re-elected in the 1998 election for a second six-year term, but resigned from parliament on 22 February 2002, having indicated to his party some months previously that he wished to move on to other things.

After resigning from parliament, Gibson was a board member of Concept Systems, a payroll and human resource management company; director of the Tasmanian advisory board of the AMP; Australian government nominated director to the board of the Australian Stem Cell Centre; director of the Australian National Maritime Museum, and several other companies.

Gibson was appointed a Member of the Order of Australia in June 1988, and received the Centenary Medal in 2000.

Gibson died from cancer on 15 August 2017 at the age of 80.
