= John Devereux (politician) =

Australian politician

Senator for Tasmania
- In office 11 July 1987 – 7 February 1996
- Succeeded by: Sue Mackay

Personal details
- Born: 8 February 1946 (age 80) Gormanston, Tasmania, Australia
- Party: Labor (to 1994); Independent (from 1994)

John Robert Devereux (born 8 February 1946) is a former Australian politician. He was a Senator for Tasmania from 1987 to 1996. He was elected as a member of the Australian Labor Party (ALP) but resigned from the party in 1994 and served the remainder of his final term as an independent.

== Early life ==
Devereux was born on 8 February 1946 in Gormanston, Tasmania. He was the second of seven children born to Albert Bernard and Floris Merle Devereux. His father was a truck and bus driver.

Devereux attended St Mary's Convent School in Gormanston and St Joseph's School and R. M. Murray High School in Queenstown. He trained as an electrician at the Mount Lyell School of Mines in Queenstown and became involved with the Electrical Trades Union (ETU). He worked as a state organiser for the ETU from 1975 to 1978 and was then state secretary until his election to the Senate in 1987.

== Politics ==
He was first nominated to fill the casual vacancy caused by the resignation of Don Grimes in April 1987. However, his nomination was rejected by a tied vote in the Tasmanian Parliament. As one Tasmanian Minister (Ray Groom) argued: "we can choose only a person who is a member of the same party ... but we are not bound to accept the nomination of the party concerned". Following a double dissolution of the Commonwealth Parliament, Devereux was elected at the election of 11 July 1987.

From 24 to 27 January 1994, thirty protesters from the Tasmanian Wilderness Society (TWS) blockaded Riveaux Road in the Picton Valley in Tasmania to prevent logging of woodland. At the blockade, Devereux announced his resignation from the ALP in protest against its policies on forest issues.

Devereux served out the rest of his term, from 1994 until 1996, as an independent Senator.

On 7 February 1996, Devereux resigned from the Senate in order to contest the 1996 Tasmanian state election as an independent. He was an unsuccessful candidate for the Tasmanian House of Assembly seat of Franklin.

== Personal life ==
He lives in Tasmania with his wife Glynis. His three children, all married, also live in Tasmania. He was previously the CEO of the Tasmanian Pacing Club.
