= Brian Archer =

Australian politician (1929–2013)

Senator for Tasmania
- In office 13 December 1975 – 31 January 1994
- Succeeded by: Eric Abetz

Personal details
- Born: 21 August 1929 Calder, Tasmania, Australia
- Died: 10 March 2013 (aged 83) Launceston, Tasmania, Australia
- Party: Liberal
- Spouse: Dorothy Bird (m. 1955)
- Relations: Dick Archer (brother)
- Occupation: Real estate agent Farmer

Brian Roper Archer (21 August 1929 – 10 March 2013) was an Australian politician and businessman. He was a member of the Liberal Party and served as a senator for Tasmania from 1975 to 1994.

== Early life ==
Archer was born on 21 August 1929 in Calder, Tasmania. He was the youngest of four children born to Ellen (née Gilmour) and Clive Anton Archer. His older brother was state upper house politician Dick Archer.

Archer was raised on his family's dairy farming property; his father was a World War I veteran who had taken up farming as part of a soldier settlement scheme. He began his education at the state school in Wynyard, going on to attend Burnie High School and Launceston Church Grammar School. His family relocated to Launceston in 1945. Archer left school at the age of seventeen and began working for C. J. Weedon and Co., a local real estate, insurance and stockbroking firm. In 1955 he returned to Wynyward and went into business as a real estate agent and valuer.

Archer was one of the first real estate agents in Tasmania to adopt a franchising model; his firm expanded to eleven offices in north-west Tasmania. He was president of the Real Estate Institute of Tasmania in 1966 and 1971 and served on the council of the Real Estate and Stock Institute of Australia. Archer developed other business interests including a building company and a sporting goods store. In 1974 he established a cattle stud and sheep farm at Boat Harbour, breeding Limousin cattle and Prolific sheep.

== Politics ==
At the 1975 federal election, which followed a double dissolution, Archer was elected to a three-year Senate term. He would be re-elected at the 1977, 1983, 1984, 1987 and 1993 elections. Two of his terms were cut short by further double dissolutions.

When John Howard became Leader of the Opposition in September 1985, Archer was appointed Shadow Special Minister of State and Spokesman on Science. He held those positions until August 1987.

Archer announced his retirement from the Senate on 21 December 1993, six months after being re-elected to another six-year term. He formally resigned from the Senate on 31 January 1994.

== Personal life ==
In 1955, Archer married Dorothy Bird, with whom he had four children. He was the founding president of the Northern Tasmanian Table Tennis Association. After leaving parliament he retired to Launceston, where he died on 10 March 2013.
