= Kay Denman =

Australian politician (1937–2026)

Senator for Tasmania
- In office 24 August 1993 – 30 June 2005
- Preceded by: Michael Tate

Personal details
- Born: 22 July 1937 Latrobe, Tasmania, Australia
- Died: 20 April 2026 (aged 88)
- Party: Labor
- Education: University of Tasmania
- Occupation: Schoolteacher

Kay Janet Denman (22 July 1937 – 20 April 2026) was an Australian politician. She was a Senator for Tasmania from 1993 to 2005, representing the Australian Labor Party (ALP). She was a schoolteacher before entering politics.

== Early life and education ==
Denman was born in Latrobe, Tasmania, and raised in Railton. She was educated at Railton Primary School and Devonport High School, before graduating with a Bachelor of Education and Diploma of Special Education from the University of Tasmania. She was a school teacher from 1958 to 1961, took a break in which she had two children, and returned to teaching from 1964 to 1989. Denman was then private secretary to Premier of Tasmania Michael Field from 1989 to 1992 and manager of the Devonport Community Legal Centre in 1993. She was an inaugural member of the Mersey Leven Family Day Care committee, in which she was a strong advocate for access to day care for children with disabilities, and was also involved with Family Planning Tasmania. Denman joined the Labor Party in the early 1980s and was the president of the Labor Party's Devonport branch and a member of its national executive from 1990.

== Senate ==
Denman was appointed to the Senate in August 1993 to fill a casual vacancy caused by the resignation of Senator Michael Tate. She was Deputy Government Whip in the Senate from 1995 to 1996 and Deputy Opposition Whip in the Senate from 1997 to 2001. Denman was a long-running chair of the Senate Standing Committee on Senators' Interests between 1996 and 2005. She was re-elected in her own right at the 1998 election and retired at the 2004 election. Her term expired on 30 June 2005. She had a strong interest in health, education and access issues during her time in parliament, and was an advocate for people with disabilities, asbestos-related issues (her hometown of Railton had a major asbestos factory) and gay and lesbian rights.

== Later career ==
After retiring from politics, Denman was a board member of disability organisation Devonfield Enterprises, a member of the Tasmanian Community Advisory Group Mental Health Advisory Committee and the North-West Area Health Services Network Advisory Group, and was made a life member of the Tasmanian Council for AIDS and Related Diseases (TasCARD). She also continued her asbestos advocacy, stating that her only regret on retiring from the Senate was that she would not be there to further the cause of those with asbestos-related diseases. She was inducted to the Tasmanian Honour Roll of Women in 2011.

== Death ==
Denman's death was announced in an official statement issued by Senator Penny Wong, on 21 April 2026. She was 88.
