= Michael Forshaw =

Australian politician (born 1952)

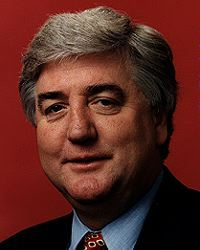

Senator for New South Wales
- In office 10 May 1994 – 30 June 2011
- Preceded by: Graham Richardson

Personal details
- Born: 11 January 1952 (age 74) Sydney, New South Wales, Australia
- Party: Australian Labor Party
- Spouse: Jan Forshaw.
- Education: University of Sydney; University of New South Wales
- Occupation: Barrister

Michael George Forshaw (born 11 January 1952) is an Australian politician who served as a member of the Australian Senate for the state of New South Wales from May 1994 to June 2011, representing the Australian Labor Party.

== Early life and education ==
Forshaw was born in Sydney. He was educated at the University of Sydney, where he graduated in arts, and the University of New South Wales, where he graduated in law.

== Career ==
Forshaw was admitted as a barrister in 1985.

Forshaw began employment with the Australian Workers' Union in 1975 as an Industrial Officer and was elected as the union's Assistant General Secretary in 1989. In 1991 Forshaw was elected as the General Secretary of the AWU when he negotiated the amalgamation of the AWU with the Federation of Industrial Manufacturing & Engineering Employees (formerly the Federated Ironworkers' Association of Australia) to form the AWU-FIMEE Amalgamated Union. From 1993 until entering the Senate in 1994 Forshaw was the Joint National Secretary of the AWU-FIMEE Amalgamated Union (which changed its name back to the AWU in 1995).

A member of Labor's right faction, on 2 March 2010 Forshaw announced his decision to retire, citing he was making way for outgoing state party boss Matt Thistlethwaite. His term ended on 30 June 2011.

In September 2016, he was elected to Sutherland Shire Council as a Councillor and in September 2020 he became Deputy Mayor.

== Personal ==
Forshaw is married to retired Sutherland Shire Councillor Jan Forshaw and has three sons, Simon, Martin and Jeremy.

Trade union offices
Preceded by Errol Hodder	General Secretary of the Australian Workers' Union; 1991–94	Succeeded by Ian Cambridge; Steve Harrison
