= Shayne Murphy =

Australian politician

Senator for Tasmania
- In office 1 July 1993 – 30 June 2005

Personal details
- Born: 8 January 1952 (age 74) Queenstown, Tasmania
- Party: Labor (1993–2001); Independent (2001–05)

Shayne Michael Murphy (born 8 January 1952), Australian politician, was a member of the Australian Senate, representing Tasmania, from 1993 to 2005. He represented the Australian Labor Party from his election until 2001, when he left the party and became an independent.

Murphy was born in Queenstown, Tasmania, and became a shearer. He became involved with the union movement, rising to become State Secretary of the Tasmanian branch of the Construction, Forestry, Mining and Energy Union. He was also the secretary of the ALP's Industry Policy Committee in Tasmania. He attributed his October 2001 resignation from the ALP to their policies on logging.

In the 2001–04 Parliament, Murphy shared the balance of power with Senators Len Harris, Brian Harradine and Meg Lees, who left the Australian Democrats in 2002. This meant that the government could pass legislation through the Senate only by winning the support of these Senators. Murphy often voted with the government to pass key pieces of legislation. An example of this was Education Minister Brendan Nelson's higher education reforms, which allowed universities to increase fees. Murphy did, however, vote down several pieces of government legislation; most notably when, in March 2004, Murphy joined with Harradine to block the full privatisation of two-thirds state-owned telecommunications company Telstra. Murphy was defeated at the 2004 election. His term expired on 30 June 2005.
