= Terry Aulich =

Australian politician

The Honourable Terry Aulich

Senator for Tasmania
- In office 1 December 1984 – 30 June 1993

Personal details
- Born: 5 October 1945 (age 80) Bathurst, New South Wales
- Party: Labor

Terrence Gordon Aulich (born 5 October 1945) is a former Australian Labor Party politician who represented the Division of Wilmot (now the Division of Lyons) in the Tasmanian House of Assembly (1976–82) and the state of Tasmania in the Federal Senate (1984–93).

== Early life ==
Born in Bathurst, New South Wales, where his father Gordon Joseph (known as the Baron) was based in the Army, Aulich grew up in Scottsdale, Tasmania. He completed his secondary education at Scottsdale High School and Launceston High School, earned a B.A. from the University of Tasmania in 1966 and worked as a teacher before entering politics.

== Career ==
=== Politics ===
Aulich was elected in the 1976 Tasmanian election and then re-elected in 1979, before being defeated in 1982. While in the Tasmanian parliament he held a number of ministerial positions in the Lowe and Holgate governments, including Administrative Services, Industrial Relations and Manpower Planning, Primary Industry, the Environment, Water Resources, Construction, Education and the Arts. In 1982 Aulich was appointed by the National Executive of the Australian Labor Party to be the State Secretary of the Tasmanian ALP with a brief to rewrite party rules, increase membership and rebuild the finances of the State Branch.

In the 1984 federal election, Aulich successfully stood for the Australian Senate, beginning his term as Senator on 1 December 1984. He was re-elected in 1987, but defeated in the 1993 election, his term as Senator expiring on 30 June 1993. His defeat was due to a preselection which demoted him to an unwinnable position on the ALP ticket. Knowing that he would not be reelected with his placing on the ALP ticket, Senator Aulich made his valedictory speech in the Senate in late 1992 despite still being a candidate at the 1993 election.

During his term in the Senate he chaired a number of key Committees such as Education, Employment and Training, the ALP Caucus Committee on Legal Affairs, the Industrial Relations Committee and the Select Committee on the Australia Card which recommended the creation of the Privacy Act, the Tax File Number system, 100 points bank account verification and other anti-fraud and privacy protection measures. The then Labor Government implemented those recommendations. Aulich also chaired the ALP caucus committee which recommended to Cabinet that gay people should legally be permitted to enter or remain in the Armed Forces.

=== Business ===
In 1993 Aulich set up Aulich and Co, strategic advisors to a large number of corporate and not-for-profit organisations such as IBM, AMCOR, Glaxo-Wellcome, the Biometrics Institute. Aulich and Co provides polling and focus group services for its clients. He was Chair of the Clubs NSW Code Authority and the Privacy Committee of the Association of Market and Social Research Organisations. He was Senior Vice President of Professions Australia until 2012 and chaired the Biometrics Institute's Privacy Committee.

He later became chief executive officer of national organisations in the education sector and in 2009 was appointed chief executive officer of the Australian Institute of Quantity Surveyors which represents cost managers in the construction industry across Australia and the Asia-Pacific region. He retired from the AIQS in February 2012 to return as chief executive officer of Aulich & Co which provides market research, polling, communications and business strategies to associations and business.

In 2012 he was appointed Chair of the Industry Reference Panel of the University of New South Wales-led consortium (Alliance for Building Excellence) which aims to set bench-marks for improving efficiencies, cost controls and quality in Australia's construction industry. In the same year he an Australian Standards Organisation delegate to the Paris conference which set international standards in biometric usage for areas such as passport controls and identity protection. He was a guest speaker at conferences in both Paris and London, speaking about the challenges of privacy protection and new technologies.

== Writing ==
Aulich's fictional book The River's End was published in 1992, covering the Franklin River dispute. It was selected by the Australian newspaper as one of the year's best crime novels. Aulich's play "Moonlight at Midday" was produced at the National Playwrights' Conference in the late 1990s and a book of poetry "Acacia Road" was published in 1976. A second novel, Clapperland, a black comedy about the nexus between social media, mega churches and politics was published in 2020 and a third, "Sete", which satirized right wing rebellions in France, in 2021.His fourth novel, "Darwin's Vineyard", published in 2026, was set in Tasmania's East Coast and Hobart and dealt with the theme of crime, privilege and belonging in modern Tasmania. It was described by journalist Charles Wooley as a metaphor for the Age of Putin and Trump.
