= Kerry O'Brien (politician) =

Australian politician

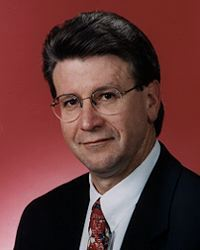

Senator for Tasmania
- In office 15 September 1996 – 30 June 2011
- Preceded by: John Coates

Personal details
- Born: Kerry Williams Kelso O'Brien; 19 July 1951 (age 75) Sydney, New South Wales, Australia
- Party: Labor
- Education: University of Sydney; University of New South Wales
- Occupation: Trade union official
- Website: Parliament of Australia – Biography

Kerry Williams Kelso O'Brien (born 19 July 1951), is an Australian former politician. O'Brien was a member of the Australian Senate for the state of Tasmania from September 1996 until June 2011, representing the Australian Labor Party.

== Background ==
O'Brien was born in Sydney. He was a research officer and elected official with the Federated Miscellaneous Workers' Union 1974–92, and Tasmanian Branch Secretary of the Australian Liquor, Hospitality and Miscellaneous Workers' Union 1992–96.

== Political career – Australian Senate ==
O'Brien was an Opposition Whip in the Senate 1998–2001, and was a member of the Opposition Shadow Ministry from November 2001 till 2007. He was Shadow Minister for Primary Industries and Shadow Minister for Resources 2001–03, Shadow Minister for Reconciliation and Indigenous Affairs and Shadow Minister for Tourism, Regional Services and Territories 2003–04, and Shadow Minister for Regional Services, Local Government and Territories 2004–05. He was appointed Shadow Minister for Transport in June 2005.

From December 2007 to September 2010, he held the position of Chief Government Whip in the Senate.

On 9 April 2010, he lost Labor preselection for the 2010 Australian federal election. His Senate term expired in June 2011.
