= Michael Tate =

Australian legal academic, politician and priest (1945–2026)

The Honourable and Reverend Michael Tate AO

Minister for Justice
- In office 27 May 1992 – 24 March 1993
- Prime Minister: Paul Keating
- Preceded by: Himself (as Minister for Justice and Consumer Affairs)
- Succeeded by: Duncan Kerr
- In office 18 September 1987 – 4 April 1990
- Prime Minister: Bob Hawke
- Preceded by: Position established
- Succeeded by: Himself (as Minister for Justice and Consumer Affairs)

Minister Assisting the Minister for Immigration, Local Government and Ethnic Affairs
- In office 27 May 1992 – 24 March 1993
- Prime Minister: Paul Keating
- Preceded by: Position established
- Succeeded by: Nick Bolkus (as Minister Assisting the Prime Minister for Multicultural Affairs)

Minister for Justice and Consumer Affairs
- In office 4 April 1990 – 27 May 1992
- Prime Minister: Bob Hawke; Paul Keating
- Preceded by: Himself (as Minister for Justice); Nick Bolkus (as Minister for Consumer Affairs)
- Succeeded by: Himself (as Minister for Justice); Jeannette McHugh (as Minister for Consumer Affairs)

Parliamentary-Secretary for Justice
- In office 24 July 1987 – 18 September 1987
- Prime Minister: Bob Hawke
- Preceded by: Position established
- Succeeded by: Position abolished

Special Minister of State
- In office 16 February 1987 – 24 July 1987
- Prime Minister: Bob Hawke
- Preceded by: Mick Young
- Succeeded by: Susan Ryan

Senator for Tasmania
- In office 1 July 1978 – 5 July 1993
- Succeeded by: Kay Denman

Personal details
- Born: Michael Carter Tate; 6 July 1945 Sydney, New South Wales, Australia
- Died: 5 June 2026 (aged 80)
- Party: Australian Labor Party
- Education: University of Tasmania; University of Oxford
- Occupation: Priest, legal academic

Michael Carter Tate (6 July 1945 – 5 June 2026) was an Australian legal academic and Labor Party politician who later became an ambassador and then a Catholic priest.

== Early life and education ==
Michael Carter Tate was born in Sydney on 6 July 1945.

He was educated at St Virgil's College in Hobart, and then studied law at the University of Tasmania, where he resided at St. John Fisher College and graduated with a Bachelor of Laws with First Class Honours in 1968. He attributed his achievement to the long hours he spent in libraries, rather than in sporting or social activities, while recovering from a serious road accident in 1963, which hospitalised him in neck-to-knee plaster for five months and required further operations for the next eight years.

Tate later gained a Master of Arts in theology from the University of Oxford in 1971.

== Career ==
=== Early career ===
Tate worked as a lecturer in law at the University of Tasmania Faculty of Law from 1972 to 1978, serving as dean of the faculty from 1977 to 1978.

He served as legal adviser to the Tasmanian Parliamentary Delegation to the Constitutional Conventions from 1973 to 1977, and was a member of the Catholic Commission for Justice and Peace from 1972 to 1978.

=== Politics ===
Tate was elected to the Senate representing Tasmania, at the 1977 election, his term commencing on 1 July 1978. He was re-elected in 1983, 1987 and 1993. He was President of the Parliamentary Christian Fellowship 1985 to 1988. In 1986 he chaired two Senate enquiries into the conduct of his former Labor colleague and now High Court justice Lionel Murphy. He concluded that on the civil law standard of proof, the balance of probabilities, Murphy had a case to answer on the charge of perverting the course of justice, but not if the criminal standard, beyond reasonable doubt, was applied. He served as Minister for Justice from 1987 to 1993 in the Hawke and Keating governments, in addition to other portfolios. He resigned from the Senate on 5 July 1993.

After leaving politics he was appointed Australian ambassador to the Netherlands and the Holy See, before retiring to enter the priesthood.

=== Priesthood ===
On 19 May 2000 he was ordained by the Archbishop of Hobart, the Most Rev. Adrian Leo Doyle in St Mary's Cathedral, Hobart. Guests included former Governor-General Bill Hayden, former Prime Minister, Gough Whitlam, and former Attorneys-General Lionel Bowen and Michael Duffy. Congratulatory messages were received from Pope John Paul II and former Prime Ministers Bob Hawke and Paul Keating. That night, he told the ABC's 7.30 Report that during his last audience with the Pope as Ambassador to the Holy See, John Paul II asked him what his next posting would be. John Paul was somewhat surprised when Tate told him he would be studying for the priesthood.

Tate worked as parish priest of the Roman Catholic Parishes of Bridgewater, Sandy Bay, Huon Valley, and South Hobart. He also served the Catholic Archdiocese of Hobart for a time as Vicar General.

In April 2008, Tate participated in the Future of Australian Governance Committee at the Australia 2020 Summit as a general summit delegate.

On 18 November 2010, Tate was appointed Tasmania's first Parliamentary Standards Commissioner. The role was established under the Integrity Commission Act 2009. The Commissioner is independent of the Integrity Commission and provides advice to Members of Parliament and the Integrity Commission about conduct, propriety and ethics and the interpretation of any relevant codes of conduct and guidelines relating to the conduct of Members of Parliament.

On top of his ministry, Tate continued his research in law, particularly in the area of international humanitarian law, and worked in a part-time capacity as Honorary Research Professor at the University of Tasmania's Faculty of Law. He was a member of Australian Red Cross's International Humanitarian Law Committee.

== Death ==
Tate died on 5 June 2026 in Hobart, Tasmania, at the age of 80.

== Honours ==
In 1992 and 1996, respectively, Tate was awarded honorary doctorates from the University of Tasmania and Charles Sturt University.

In the 1996 Australia Day Honours, he was appointed an Officer of the Order of Australia (AO). All of these awards honoured the role Tate played as Federal Minister for Justice.

He was invited to give the Newman Lecture at Mannix College, Monash University.

Political offices
Preceded by Mick Young	Special Minister of State; 1987	Succeeded by Frank Walker
Preceded by New title	Minister for Justice; 1987–1993	Succeeded by Duncan Kerr
Preceded by Nick Bolkus	Minister for Consumer Affairs; 1990–1992	Succeeded by Jeannette McHugh
Diplomatic posts
Preceded by Terence McCarthy	Australian Ambassador to the Holy See; 1993–1996	Succeeded by Edward Stevens
Preceded by Warwick Weemaes	Australian Ambassador to the Netherlands; 1993 – 1996	Succeeded by Ted Delofski
