= Sue Mackay =

Australian politician

Senator for Tasmania
- In office 8 March 1996 – 29 July 2005
- Preceded by: John Devereux
- Succeeded by: Carol Brown

Personal details
- Born: 14 April 1960 (age 65) Aberdeen, Scotland
- Party: Labor
- Domestic partner: David Crean

Sue Mary Mackay (born 14 April 1960) is a former Australian politician who served as a Senator for Tasmania from 1996 to 2005, representing the Australian Labor Party (ALP). She was a shadow minister under Kim Beazley (1998–2001) and an opposition whip (2001–2004).

== Early life ==
Mackay was born on 14 April 1960 in Aberdeen, Scotland. She came to Australia in the late 1960s with her parents and brothers. Prior to entering politics she worked as an organiser for the Federated Liquor and Allied Industries Employees' Union of Australia (1980–1982), employment officer for the Commonwealth Employment Service (1982–1983), and as women's organiser (1983–1984) and state industrial officer (1984–1988) for the Public Sector Union.

== Politics ==
Mackay joined the Australian Labor Party in 1978. After leaving her union job she served as a senior adviser to Tasmanian Labor parliamentarians, including federal MP Duncan Kerr (1988–1990), state health minister John White (1990–1992) and opposition leader Michael Field (1992). She then served as state secretary of the Australian Labor Party (Tasmanian Branch) from 1992 to 1996.

=== Senate ===
In March 1996, Mackay was appointed to the Senate to fill a casual vacancy caused by the resignation of John Devereux. She was elected to a six-year term in her own right at the 1996 federal election, and re-elected in 2001.

Mackay was made a shadow parliamentary secretary in August 1997, and after the 1998 election was appointed to Kim Beazley's shadow ministry with responsibility for regional services, territories and local government. She was strongly against the privatisation of Telstra. Following the 2001 election, she was instead elected Opposition Whip in the Senate, a position she held until after the 2004 election.

Mackay announced her retirement from politics in July 2005, citing the ill health of her partner as well as "the impending change in numbers in the Senate" (the Howard government's new majority status). She stated that she left parliament "with a real sense of apprehension at the unfettered power of the executive with none of the checks and balances that the Senate has provided".

== Personal life ==
As of 2018, Mackay was in a long-term relationship with former Tasmanian state MP David Crean. They moved to Victoria in 2008 to be closer to Crean's elderly parents, buying a house in South Yarra.
