= Brian Harradine =

Australian politician (1935–2014)

- Harradine in 1996

Senator for Tasmania
- In office 11 November 1975 – 30 June 2005
- Preceded by: Merv Everett
- Succeeded by: Christine Milne

Father of the Senate
- In office 1993–2005 Serving with Mal Colston
- Preceded by: Peter Durack
- Succeeded by: John Watson

Personal details
- Born: 9 January 1935 Quorn, South Australia
- Died: 14 April 2014 (aged 79) Tasmania, Australia
- Party: Independent (1975–1984); Tasmanian Independent Senator Brian Harradine Group (1984–2005)
- Other political affiliations: Labor (until 1975)

Richard William Brian Harradine (9 January 1935 – 14 April 2014) was an Australian politician who served as an independent member of the Australian Senate, from 1975 to 2005, representing the state of Tasmania. He was the longest-serving independent federal politician in Australian history, and a Father of the Senate.

== Early life ==
Harradine was born in Quorn, South Australia, and moved to Tasmania in 1959.

== Political career ==
He was an official for the Federated Clerks' Union. He then served from 1964 to 1976 as Secretary-General of the Tasmanian Trades and Labour Council and a member of the executive of the Australian Council of Trade Unions.

In 1968, the Federal Executive of the Australian Labor Party (ALP) refused to let Harradine take his seat on the body. He was suspected of links with the Democratic Labor Party, and had declared that "the friends of the Communists intend to try and silence me". The Executive's actions prompted ALP leader Gough Whitlam, who had supported Harradine, to resign and seek a renewed mandate from the caucus. He was re-elected by a narrow margin, 38 votes to 32, in a ballot against Jim Cairns.

In 1975, the Federal Executive, by a majority of only one vote, expelled Harradine. It subsequently rejected, by the same margin, an attempt to convene a special conference to hear his appeal. The Executive's action came after the Tasmanian State Executive declined to expel him. He had been accused of involvement with the National Civic Council.

He decided to contest the 1975 election as an independent for the Senate, and won comfortably. Thereafter, he remained a senator until deciding not to contest the 2004 election. His term expired on 30 June 2005.

From 1993 to 1999, Harradine and Mal Colston were joint Fathers of the Senate. Between 1999 and 2005, Harradine held the title alone.

He was a particularly important figure in the Senate between 1994 and 1999. (See Australian Senate for the Senate numbers.) From December 1994 to March 1996, the make-up of the Senate meant that Harradine's vote combined with that of Labor and the Australian Democrats was just enough to pass Labor government legislation, making his support extremely valuable to either side of politics. Then, after the March 1996 election and the resignation from the Labor Party by the disgraced Colston, Harradine's and Colston's votes were sufficient to pass Coalition legislation, notably the Native Title Amendment Act 1998 (also known as the "Wik ten-point plan") and the partial privatisation of Telstra. He secured $350 million in communications and environmental funding for Tasmania in return for backing the Telstra legislation. However, he refused to support the Goods and Services Tax. After 1 July 1999, the Coalition needed four extra votes to pass Senate legislation so Harradine's vote became less important.

He was socially conservative, reflecting his Catholic values. He opposed abortion, embryonic stem cell research, same-sex marriage, and pornography. He secured a ministerial veto on importation of the abortifacient RU486, and a prohibition on Australian overseas aid financing family planning that included abortion advice.

=== Electoral results ===
Date of election	Constituency	Votes	%
1980 Australian federal election	Senate	52,247 (#3)	21.4
1983 Australian federal election	Senate	44,696 (#3)	17.8
1987 Australian federal election	Senate	37,037 (#3)	13.3
1993 Australian federal election	Senate	32,202 (#3)	10.4
1998 Australian federal election	Senate	24,254 (#3)	7.9

== Tasmanian Independent Senator Brian Harradine Group ==
Tasmanian Independent Senator Brian Harradine Group
- Abbreviation: HAR; Harradine Group
- Leader: Brian Harradine
- Founder: Brian Harradine
- Founded: 12 June 1984
- Registered: 2 August 1984
- Dissolved: 22 August 2005
- Ideology: Social conservatism Tasmanian regionalism
- Senate: 1 / 12 (Tasmania seats) (1984–2005)

Harradine formed the Tasmanian Independent Senator Brian Harradine Group ahead of the 1984 Australian Senate election. The party was registered on 2 August 1984 and was voluntarily deregistered on 22 August 2005 after Harradine retired from the Senate.

== Death ==
He died in April 2014 at his home, in Tasmania, aged 79. He had suffered several strokes prior to his death. Prime Minister Tony Abbott offered Harradine's family a state funeral, which was accepted. The funeral was held on 23 April 2014 at St Mary's Cathedral, Hobart.

Parliament of Australia
Preceded by Peter Durack	Father of the Australian Senate; 1993–2005 with Mal Colston (1993–1999)	Succeeded by John Watson
