= John Watson (Australian politician) =

Australian politician (1937–2025)

John Watson AM

Senator for Tasmania
- In office 1 July 1978 – 30 June 2008

Personal details
- Born: 25 January 1937 Launceston, Tasmania, Australia
- Died: 8 August 2025 (aged 88)
- Party: Liberal
- Profession: Accountant

John Odin Wentworth Watson AM (25 January 1937 – 8 August 2025) was an Australian politician. He was a Liberal member of the Australian Senate from 1978 to 2008, representing the state of Tasmania. From July 2005 until he left parliament in June 2008, he was the Father of the Senate.

== Life and career ==
Watson was born in Launceston and educated at the University of Tasmania, where he graduated in economics and accountancy. He was a chartered accountant, company director and lecturer in accountancy before entering politics.

Watson was a member of the Coalition Shadow Ministry from 1990 to 1994 but never held ministerial office. He was however one of the Senate's leading experts on taxation and superannuation matters and was highly regarded by his Coalition colleagues.

He was expected to announce his retirement at the 2007 election, but decided to recontest, despite being 70 years of age. On 12 May 2007, Watson was defeated in his bid for preselection after his decision to recontest sparked anger within the party. His Senate term ended on 30 June 2008.

John Watson died on 8 August 2025, at the age of 88.

Parliament of Australia
Preceded by Brian Harradine	Father of the Australian Senate; 2005–2008	Succeeded by Ron Boswell
