= Electoral results for the Australian Senate in South Australia =

This is a list of electoral results for the Australian Senate in South Australia since Federation in 1901.

== Election results ==
=== Elections in the 2020s ===
==== 2025 ====
2025 Australian federal election: Senate, South Australia
| Party | Candidate | Votes | % | ±% |
|---|---|---|---|---|
| Quota | | 146,458 | | |
| Labor | 1. Marielle Smith (elected 1); 2. Karen Grogan (elected 3); 3. Charlotte Walker (elected 6); 4. Jennifer Allison | 395,872 | 38.61 | +6.35 |
| Liberal | 1. Alex Antic (elected 2); 2. Anne Ruston (elected 4); 3. David Fawcett; 4. Damian Wyld | 284,314 | 27.73 | –6.20 |
| Greens | 1. Sarah Hanson-Young (elected 5); 2. Noah Schultz-Byard | 130,162 | 12.70 | +0.75 |
| One Nation | 1. Jennifer Game; 2. Carlos Quaremba | 56,168 | 5.26 | +1.21 |
| Trumpet of Patriots | 1. Nicole Smeltz; 2. Bob Day; 3. Antonio Rea; 4. Matilda Bawden | 29,963 | 2.80 | +2.36 |
| Legalise Cannabis | 1. Jessica Nies; 2. Timothy John Hall | 27,787 | 2.71 | +0.39 |
| Lambie | 1. Rex Patrick; 2. Anne Elizabeth Fordham | 27,733 | 2.71 | +2.71 |
| Family First | 1. Frederick Christopher Brohier; 2. Deepa Mathew | 21,235 | 1.99 | +1.98 |
| Animal Justice | 1. Frankie Bray; 2. Julie Pastro | 13,676 | 1.33 | −0.43 |
| People First | 1. Rob Lonie; 2. Patrick J. Amadio | 12,150 | 1.14 | +1.14 |
| Libertarian | 1. Tyler Bradley Green; 2. Jacob Nicholas Van Raalte | 10,077 | 0.94 | +0.94 |
| Australia's Voice | 1. Jordan Shane; 2. Craig Michael Nielsen | 7,146 | 0.70 | +0.70 |
| National | 1. Monique Crossling; 2. Emma Azzopardi | 4,973 | 0.49 | +0.14 |
| Fusion | 1. Imelda Adamson Agars; 2. Drew Wolfendale | 4,666 | 0.46 | +0.13 |
| Sustainable Australia | 1. Madeleine Wearne; 2. Michael Dwyer | 3,162 | 0.30 | −0.02 |
| Citizens | 1. Louise Ackland; 2. Mark Freer | 1,462 | 0.14 | +0.03 |
| Ungrouped | Kosta Hadjimarkou; Janette Gail Francis | 1,059 | 0.10 | −3.42 |
| Total formal votes | | 1,025,200 | 95.80 | −1.28 |
| Informal votes | | 44,996 | 4.20 | +1.28 |
| Turnout | | 1,070,196 | 81.89 | −9.61 |

| # | Senator | Party |
|---|---|---|
| 1 | Marielle Smith | Labor |
| 2 | Alex Antic | Liberal |
| 3 | Karen Grogan | Labor |
| 4 | Anne Ruston | Liberal |
| 5 | Sarah Hanson-Young | Greens |
| 6 | Charlotte Walker | Labor |

Results are not final. Last updated on 13 May 2025 at 6:20 PM AEST.

==== 2022 ====
2022 Australian federal election: Senate, South Australia
| Party | Candidate | Votes | % | ±% |
|---|---|---|---|---|
| Quota | | 158,672 | | |
| Liberal | 1. Simon Birmingham (elected 1); 2. Andrew McLachlan (elected 3); 3. Kerrynne Liddle (elected 6); 4. Tania Stock | 382,874 | 33.93 | –3.88 |
| Labor | 1. Penny Wong (elected 2); 2. Don Farrell (elected 4); 3. Trimann Gill; 4. Joanne Sutton; 5. Belinda Owens | 364,104 | 32.26 | +1.90 |
| Greens | 1. Barbara Pocock (elected 5); 2. Major Sumner; 3. Melanie Selwood | 134,908 | 11.95 | +1.04 |
| One Nation | 1. Jennifer Game; 2. Alan Watchman | 45,249 | 4.01 | –0.86 |
| United Australia | 1. Michael Arbon; 2. Caelum Schild | 34,167 | 3.03 | +0.00 |
| Group O | 1. Nick Xenophon; 2. Stirling Griff | 33,713 | 2.99 | +2.99 |
| Legalise Cannabis | 1. Tyler Green; 2. Angela Adams | 26,235 | 2.32 | +0.19 |
| Liberal Democrats | 1. Ian Markos; 2. Josh Smith | 24,866 | 2.20 | +1.53 |
| Rex Patrick Team | 1. Rex Patrick; 2. Leonie McMahon | 23,425 | 2.08 | +2.08 |
| Animal Justice | 1. Louise Pfeiffer; 2. Julie Pastro | 19,843 | 1.76 | –0.11 |
| Great Australian | 1. Jo-Anne Eason; 2. Trevor Bennett | 6,910 | 0.61 | –0.55 |
| Federation | 1. Cathy Byrne; 2. Nick Duffield | 4,902 | 0.43 | +0.43 |
| Australian Family | 1. Bob Day; 2. Pat Amadio | 4,799 | 0.43 | +0.43 |
| National | 1. Lisa Blandford; 2. Damien Buijs | 3,969 | 0.35 | +0.35 |
| Fusion | 1. Drew Wolfendale; 2. David Kennedy | 3,770 | 0.33 | +0.33 |
| Sustainable Australia | 1. Elise Michie; 2. Jack Duxbury | 3,448 | 0.31 | –0.17 |
| Democrats | 1. Roger Yazbek; 2. Sandra Kanck | 3,194 | 0.28 | –0.31 |
| Local | 1. Julie-Ann Finney; 2. Rodney Parnell | 2,389 | 0.21 | +0.21 |
| Informed Medical Options | 1. Raina Cruise; 2. Heather Harley | 2,320 | 0.21 | +0.21 |
| Citizens | 1. Russell Francis; 2. Rodney Currey | 1,205 | 0.11 | –0.04 |
| Democratic Alliance | 1. Adila Yarmuhammad; 2. Amina Yarmuhammad | 1,011 | 0.09 | +0.09 |
| Group M | 1. Harmeet Kaur; 2. Rajesh Kumar | 571 | 0.05 | +0.05 |
| Ungrouped | Michael Hopper | 652 | 0.06 | −0.04 |
| Total formal votes | | 1,128,524 | 97.08 | +0.58 |
| Informal votes | | 33,948 | 2.92 | −0.58 |
| Turnout | | 1,162,472 | 91.50 | –2.20 |
| Party total seats | | | Seats | ± |
| Liberal | | | 5 | ▲1 |
| Labor | | | 4 | Steady |
| Greens | | | 2 | ▲1 |
| Centre Alliance | | | 0 | ▼2 |

| # | Senator | Party |
| 1 | Simon Birmingham | Liberal |
| 2 | Penny Wong | Labor |
| 3 | Andrew McLachlan | Liberal |
| 4 | Don Farrell | Labor |
| 5 | Barbara Pocock | Greens |
| 6 | Kerrynne Liddle | Liberal |

=== Elections in the 2010s ===
==== 2019 ====
2019 Australian federal election: Senate, South Australia
| Party | Candidate | Votes | % | ±% |
|---|---|---|---|---|
| Quota | | 156,404 | | |
| Liberal | 1. Anne Ruston (elected 1); 2. David Fawcett (elected 3); 3. Alex Antic (elected 6); 4. Lucy Gichuhi | 413,957 | 37.81 | +5.16 |
| Labor | 1. Alex Gallacher (elected 2); 2. Marielle Smith (elected 4); 3. Emily Gore; 4. Larissa Harrison | 332,399 | 30.36 | +3.04 |
| Greens | 1. Sarah Hanson-Young (elected 5); 2. Major Sumner; 3. Gwydion Rozitisolds; 4. Robyn Seto | 119,470 | 10.91 | +5.03 |
| One Nation | 1. Jennifer Game; 2. Emma Illies | 53,314 | 4.87 | +1.88 |
| United Australia | 1. Kristian Rees; 2. Kerry Kovacs; 3. Sharon Hoskin | 33,191 | 3.03 | +3.03 |
| Centre Alliance | 1. Skye Kakoschke-Moore; 2. Craig Bossie | 28,416 | 2.60 | −19.16 |
| HEMP | 1. Angela Adams; 2. Matthew Iverson | 23,265 | 2.13 | +2.13 |
| Animal Justice | 1. Louise Pfeiffer; 2. Wendy Davey | 20,445 | 1.87 | +1.02 |
| Conservatives | 1. Rikki Lambert; 2. Carl Teusner | 16,145 | 1.47 | +1.47 |
| Great Australian | 1. Mark Aldridge; 2. Gary Matthews | 12,698 | 1.16 | +1.16 |
| Shooters, Fishers, Farmers | 1. John Hahn; 2. Wayne Kirk | 12,003 | 1.10 | +0.36 |
| Conservative National | 1. Peter Manuel; 2. Tim Dwyer | 7,829 | 0.72 | +0.72 |
| Liberal Democrats | 1. Kimbra Ransley; 2. Stephen Humble | 7,345 | 0.67 | +0.02 |
| Democrats | 1. Tim Burrow; 2. Andrew Castrique | 6,497 | 0.59 | +0.59 |
| Sustainable Australia | 1. Graham Davies; 2. Robyn Coleman | 5,295 | 0.48 | +0.48 |
| Citizens Electoral Council | 1. Sean Allwood; 2. Paul Siebert | 1,611 | 0.15 | +0.10 |
| Ungrouped | Michael Lesiw; Brett O'Donnell; Henry Cox | 943 | 0.09 | +0.01 |
| Total formal votes | | 1,094,823 | 96.50 | −0.17 |
| Informal votes | | 39,733 | 3.50 | +0.17 |
| Turnout | | 1,134,556 | 93.70 | +0.91 |

| Elected | # | Senator | Party |
| 2019 | 1 | Anne Ruston | Liberal |
| 2019 | 2 | Alex Gallacher | Labor |
| 2019 | 3 | David Fawcett | Liberal |
| 2019 | 4 | Marielle Smith | Labor |
| 2019 | 5 | Sarah Hanson-Young | Greens |
| 2019 | 6 | Alex Antic | Liberal |
2016
| 2016 | 1 | Simon Birmingham | Liberal |
| 2016 | 2 | Penny Wong | Labor |
| 2016 | 3 | Rex Patrick | Centre Alliance |
| 2016 | 4 | Cory Bernardi | Conservatives (Note: Cory Bernardi had resigned from the Liberal Party in February 2017 to form a separate party, the Australian Conservatives.) (Note: Lucy Gichuhi resigned from Family First and joined the Liberal Party.) |
| 2016 | 5 | Don Farrell | Labor |
| 2016 | 6 | Stirling Griff | Centre Alliance |

==== 2016 ====
2016 Australian federal election: Senate, South Australia
| Party | Candidate | Votes | % | ±% |
|---|---|---|---|---|
| Quota | | 81,629 | | |
| Liberal | 1. Simon Birmingham (elected 1); 2. Cory Bernardi (elected 4); 3. Anne Ruston (elected 7); 4. David Fawcett (elected 9); 5. Sean Edwards; 6. Kerrynne Liddle | 346,423 | 32.65 | +5.20 |
| Labor | 1. Penny Wong (elected 2); 2. Don Farrell (elected 5); 3. Alex Gallacher (elected 8); 4. Anne McEwen; 5. Michael Allison; 6. Bronwyn Gallacher | 289,942 | 27.32 | +4.66 |
| Xenophon | 1. Nick Xenophon (elected 3); 2. Stirling Griff (elected 6); 3. Skye Kakoschke-Moore (elected 10) (Note: Kakoschke-Moore resigned on 22 November 2017 after learning she was a British citizen by descent. The Court of Disputed Returns declared she had been ineligible to be elected on 13 February 2018. A special recount determined that Tim Storer was elected instead.); 4. Tim Storer | 230,866 | 21.76 | −3.12 |
| Greens | 1. Sarah Hanson-Young (elected 11); 2. Robert Simms; 3. Jody Moate; 4. Harriet de Kok | 62,345 | 5.88 | −1.21 |
| One Nation | 1. Steven Burgess; 2. Angelina Nicolis | 31,681 | 2.99 | +2.70 |
| Family First | 1. Bob Day (elected 12) (Note: Day was found ineligible by the Court of Disputed Returns. A special recount led to Gichuhi being declared to have been elected on 19 April 2017.); 2. Lucy Gichuhi | 29,187 | 2.75 | −1.01 |
| Sex Party–HEMP joint ticket | 1. Ryan Parker; 2. Margaret Saunders | 12,102 | 1.14 | +1.14 |
| Animal Justice | 1. Tania Noble; 2. Emma Breagan | 9,000 | 0.85 | +0.23 |
| Shooters, Fishers, Farmers | 1. John Hahn; 2. Nick Carter | 7,825 | 0.74 | +0.15 |
| Liberal Democrats | 1. Roostam Sadri; 2. Michael Noack | 6,924 | 0.65 | −2.88 |
| Motoring Enthusiasts | 1. Nathan Green; 2. Judith Kuerschner | 5,101 | 0.48 | −0.18 |
| Mature Australia | 1. Darryl Bothe; 2. Lyndal Denny | 4,448 | 0.42 | +0.42 |
| Liberty Alliance | 1. Wanda Lee Marsh; 2. Andrew Horwood | 4,441 | 0.42 | +0.42 |
| Marriage Equality | 1. Adrian Tuazon-McCheyne; 2. Alex Bond | 4,056 | 0.38 | +0.38 |
| Arts | 1. Terence Crawford; 2. Charles Sanders | 3,371 | 0.32 | +0.32 |
| Christian Democrats | 1. Matt Attia; 2. Joseph Stephen | 3,011 | 0.26 | +0.26 |
| Justice | 1. Lynn-Marie Grosser; 2. Colin Thomas | 2,362 | 0.22 | +0.22 |
| Voluntary Euthanasia | 1. Jessica Knight; 2. Kym Buckley | 2,289 | 0.22 | −0.09 |
| Cyclists | 1. Sundance Bilson-Thompson; 2. Angus Harker-Smith | 1,668 | 0.16 | +0.16 |
| Progressives | 1. Sasha Pazeski-Nikoloski; 2. Jaz Priddey | 1,161 | 0.11 | +0.11 |
| VOTEFLUX.ORG | 1. Adam Bird; 2. Jeff Baker | 826 | 0.08 | +0.08 |
| Palmer United | 1. Kristian Rees; 2. Carlo Filingeri | 782 | 0.07 | −2.58 |
| Citizens Electoral Council | 1. Alex Kozlow; 2. Paul Siebert | 500 | 0.05 | +0.05 |
| Ungrouped | Ron Waters; Christopher Cochrane; Adam Richards; Mohammad Ali; Dave Saddler; Malcolm Davey | 854 | 0.08 | −0.14 |
| Total formal votes | | 1,061,165 | 96.67 | −0.68 |
| Informal votes | | 36,545 | 3.33 | +0.68 |
| Turnout | | 1,097,710 | 92.79 | −1.56 |

| # | Senator | Party |
| 1 | Simon Birmingham | Liberal |
| 2 | Penny Wong | Labor |
| 3 | Nick Xenophon | NXT |
| 4 | Cory Bernardi | Liberal |
| 5 | Don Farrell | Labor |
| 6 | Stirling Griff | NXT |
| 7 | Anne Ruston | Liberal |
| 8 | Alex Gallacher | Labor |
| 9 | David Fawcett | Liberal |
| 10 | Skye Kakoschke-Moore | NXT |
| 11 | Sarah Hanson-Young | Greens |
| 12 | Bob Day | FFP |

==== 2013 ====
2013 Australian federal election: Senate, South Australia
| Party | Candidate | Votes | % | ±% |
|---|---|---|---|---|
| Quota | | 148,348 | | |
| Liberal | 1. Cory Bernardi (elected 1); 2. Simon Birmingham (elected 6); 3. Cathie Webb; 4. Gary Burgess | 285,058 | 27.45 | −9.85 |
| Xenophon Group | 1. Nick Xenophon (elected 2); 2. Stirling Griff | 258,376 | 24.88 | +24.88 |
| Labor | 1. Penny Wong (elected 3); 2. Don Farrell; 3. Simon Pisoni | 235,312 | 22.66 | −15.63 |
| Greens | 1. Sarah Hanson-Young (elected 4); 2. Nikki Mortier; 3. Matthew Carey | 73,612 | 7.09 | −6.21 |
| Family First | 1. Bob Day (elected 5); 2. Judi Potter; 3. Dan Casey | 39,032 | 3.76 | −0.32 |
| Liberal Democrats | 1. Michael Gameau; 2. Michael Noack | 36,657 | 3.53 | +2.98 |
| Palmer United | 1. James McDonald; 2. Peter Collis | 27,484 | 2.65 | +2.65 |
| Sex Party | 1. Deb Milka; 2. Jason Virgo | 10,427 | 1.00 | −0.67 |
| Democratic Labour | 1. Kim Lawless; 2. Tanya Linsell | 10,143 | 0.98 | +0.31 |
| Motoring Enthusiasts | 1. Nathan Green; 2. Robert Stewart | 6,822 | 0.66 | +0.66 |
| Animal Justice | 1. Colin Thomas; 2. Sally Sutton | 6,439 | 0.62 | +0.62 |
| Shooters and Fishers | 1. Jess Marks; 2. John Hahn | 6,151 | 0.59 | −0.54 |
| HEMP | 1. Ray Thorpe; 2. Chris Calvert | 6,032 | 0.58 | +0.58 |
| Christians | 1. Trevor Grace; 2. Theophilus Engela | 3,540 | 0.34 | +0.34 |
| Fishing and Lifestyle | 1. Darren Haydon; 2. Chris Miles | 3,354 | 0.32 | +0.32 |
| Voluntary Euthanasia | 1. Maxwell Bromson; 2. Michael Boerema | 3,198 | 0.31 | +0.31 |
| National | 1. James Stacey; 2. Rachel Titley | 3,102 | 0.30 | +0.30 |
| Democrats | 1. Jeanie Walker; 2. Andrew Castrique | 3,096 | 0.30 | −0.39 |
| One Nation | 1. Peter Fitzpatrick; 2. Kym Dunbar | 2,968 | 0.29 | −0.22 |
| Socialist Equality | 1. James Cogan; 2. Peter Byrne | 2,857 | 0.28 | +0.28 |
| Australian Independents | 1. Tanya Crago; 2. Graeme Maxwell-Jones | 2,089 | 0.20 | +0.20 |
| Smokers Rights | 1. Tyrone Lock; 2. Adam Frost | 1,899 | 0.18 | +0.18 |
| Katter's Australian | 1. Leah O'Rourke; 2. Glenn O'Rourke | 1,666 | 0.16 | +0.16 |
| Group I | 1. Ribnga Green; 2. Zita Ngor | 1,515 | 0.15 | +0.15 |
| Secular | 1. Moira Clarke; 2. Catherine Mactier | 1,271 | 0.12 | +0.03 |
| Rise Up Australia | 1. Jeff Flint; 2. Paul Hales | 1,241 | 0.12 | +0.12 |
| Drug Law Reform | 1. Damon Adams; 2. John Jiggens | 1,118 | 0.11 | +0.11 |
| Climate Sceptics | 1. Leon Ashby; 2. David Smith | 1,116 | 0.11 | −0.35 |
| Building Australia | 1. Michael Noble; 2. Bill Adams | 862 | 0.08 | −0.07 |
| Stable Population | 1. Greg Oates; 2. Madeleine Wearne | 765 | 0.07 | +0.07 |
| Group L | 1. Dianah Mieglich; 2. John Rohde | 581 | 0.06 | +0.06 |
| Country Alliance | 1. Steven Davies; 2. John Michelmore | 325 | 0.03 | +0.03 |
| Outdoor Recreation | 1. Steven Burgess; 2. Gordon Bennett | 145 | 0.01 | +0.01 |
| Independent | Robert Weaver | 99 | 0.01 | +0.01 |
| Independent | Christopher Cochrane | 82 | 0.01 | +0.01 |
| Total formal votes | | 1,038,434 | 97.35 | +0.47 |
| Informal votes | | 28,225 | 2.65 | −0.47 |
| Turnout | | 1,066,659 | 94.35 | +0.02 |

| Elected | # | Senator | Party |
| 2013 | 1 | Cory Bernardi | Liberal |
| 2013 | 2 | Nick Xenophon | Independent |
| 2013 | 3 | Penny Wong | Labor |
| 2013 | 4 | Sarah Hanson-Young | Greens |
| 2013 | 5 | Bob Day | Family First |
| 2013 | 6 | Simon Birmingham | Liberal |
2010
| 2010 | 1 | Alex Gallacher | Labor |
| 2010 | 2 | Mary Jo Fisher | Liberal |
| 2010 | 3 | Anne McEwen | Labor |
| 2010 | 4 | Sean Edwards | Liberal |
| 2010 | 5 | Penny Wright | Greens |
| 2010 | 6 | David Fawcett | Liberal |

==== 2010 ====
2010 Australian federal election: Senate, South Australia
| Party | Candidate | Votes | % | ±% |
|---|---|---|---|---|
| Quota | | 144,226 | | |
| Labor | 1. Alex Gallacher (elected 1); 2. Anne McEwen (elected 3); 3. Dana Wortley | 386,577 | 38.29 | +2.67 |
| Liberal | 1. Mary Jo Fisher (elected 2); 2. Sean Edwards (elected 4); 3. David Fawcett (elected 6); 4. Peter Salu | 376,532 | 37.30 | +2.02 |
| Greens | 1. Penny Wright (elected 5); 2. Sandy Montgomery; 3. Jeremy Miller | 134,287 | 13.30 | +6.81 |
| Family First | 1. Bob Day; 2. Andrew Cole; 3. Thea Hennessey | 41,227 | 4.08 | +1.19 |
| Sex Party | 1. Ari Reid; 2. Jason Virgo | 16,820 | 1.67 | +1.67 |
| Shooters and Fishers | 1. Steve Larsson; 2. Robert Borsak | 11,425 | 1.13 | +0.74 |
| Democrats | 1. Jeanie Walker; 2. Andrew Castrique | 6,975 | 0.69 | −0.19 |
| Democratic Labor | 1. Paul Russell; 2. David McCabe | 6,811 | 0.67 | −0.26 |
| Liberal Democrats | 1. Nick Kerry; 2. Megan Clark | 5,584 | 0.55 | +0.47 |
| One Nation | 1. Robert Edmonds; 2. Peter Fitzpatrick | 5,159 | 0.51 | −0.10 |
| Climate Sceptics | 1. Leon Ashby; 2. Nathan Ashby | 4,672 | 0.46 | +0.46 |
| Carers Alliance | 1. Gary Connor; 2. Angela Groves | 3,258 | 0.32 | +0.32 |
| Christian Democrats | 1. Joseph Stephen; 2. Frank Revink | 2,533 | 0.25 | +0.10 |
| | 1. Mark Aldridge; 2. Christopher Cochrane | 2,186 | 0.22 | +0.22 |
| Building Australia | 1. Bill Adams; 2. Neil Jackson | 1,528 | 0.15 | +0.15 |
| Senator On-Line | 1. Simon Lang; 2. Jamie Dawson | 1,173 | 0.12 | +0.06 |
| Socialist Alliance | 1. Renfrey Clarke; 2. Ruth Ratcliffe | 1,039 | 0.10 | +0.02 |
| Secular | 1. Scott Sharrad; 2. Moira Clarke | 953 | 0.09 | +0.09 |
| Independent | Michelle Drummond | 839 | 0.08 | +0.08 |
| Total formal votes | | 1,009,578 | 96.88 | −0.74 |
| Informal votes | | 32,493 | 3.12 | +0.74 |
| Turnout | | 1,042,071 | 94.33 | −1.50 |

| Elected | # | Senator | Party |
| 2010 | 1 | Alex Gallacher | Labor |
| 2010 | 2 | Mary Jo Fisher | Liberal |
| 2010 | 3 | Anne McEwen | Labor |
| 2010 | 4 | Sean Edwards | Liberal |
| 2010 | 5 | Penny Wright | Greens |
| 2010 | 6 | David Fawcett | Liberal |
2007
| 2007 | 1 | Don Farrell | Labor |
| 2007 | 2 | Cory Bernardi | Liberal |
| 2007 | 3 | Nick Xenophon | Independent |
| 2007 | 4 | Penny Wong | Labor |
| 2007 | 5 | Simon Birmingham | Liberal |
| 2007 | 6 | Sarah Hanson-Young | Greens |

Primary votes saw both the Liberals and Labor winning two seats each, leaving the Greens leading while Labor was narrowly ahead of the Liberals. Sex Party preferences saw the Greens reach the quota to secure the fifth seat, while Family First preferences saw the Liberals overtake Labor to secure the sixth vacancy. The final result was three seats Liberal, two seats Labor and one seat Green.

=== Elections in the 2000s ===
==== 2007 ====
| Elected | # | Senator | Party |
| 2007 | 1 | Don Farrell | Labor |
| 2007 | 2 | Cory Bernardi | Liberal |
| 2007 | 3 | Nick Xenophon | Independent |
| 2007 | 4 | Penny Wong | Labor |
| 2007 | 5 | Simon Birmingham | Liberal |
| 2007 | 6 | Sarah Hanson-Young | Greens |
2004
| 2004 | 1 | Nick Minchin | Liberal |
| 2004 | 2 | Anne McEwen | Labor |
| 2004 | 3 | Amanda Vanstone | Liberal |
| 2004 | 4 | Annette Hurley | Labor |
| 2004 | 5 | Mary Jo Fisher | Liberal |
| 2004 | 6 | Dana Wortley | Labor |

2007 Australian federal election: Senate, South Australia
| Party | Candidate | Votes | % | ±% |
|---|---|---|---|---|
| Quota | | 143,830 | | |
| Labor | 1. Don Farrell (elected 1); 2. Penny Wong (elected 4); 3. Cath Perry | 358,615 | 35.62 | +0.13 |
| Liberal | 1. Cory Bernardi (elected 2); 2. Simon Birmingham (elected 5); 3. Grant Chapman; 4. Maria Kourtesis | 347,256 | 34.49 | −13.00 |
| Group S | 1. Nick Xenophon (elected 3); 2. Roger Bryson | 148,789 | 14.78 | +14.78 |
| Greens | 1. Sarah Hanson-Young (elected 6); 2. Nikki Mortier; 3. Matt Rigney | 65,322 | 6.49 | −0.11 |
| Family First | 1. Tony Bates; 2. Toni Turnbull; 3. Colin Gibson | 29,114 | 2.89 | −1.09 |
| Democratic Labor | 1. Garry Hardy; 2. David McCabe | 9,343 | 0.93 | +0.93 |
| Democrats | 1. Ruth Russell; 2. Max Baumann; 3. Richard Way | 8,908 | 0.88 | −1.51 |
| One Nation | 1. Mark Aldridge; 2. David Dwyer | 6,178 | 0.61 | −0.53 |
| Fishing and Lifestyle | 1. Neil Armstrong; 2. Paul Tippins | 5,413 | 0.54 | +0.54 |
| What Women Want | 1. Emma Neumann; 2. Morag McIntosh | 4,114 | 0.41 | +0.41 |
| Shooters | 1. John Hahn; 2. Basil Borun | 3,973 | 0.39 | +0.39 |
| National | 1. Rob Howard; 2. Mark Cuthbertson | 3,632 | 0.36 | −0.04 |
| Climate Change | 1. Colin Endean; 2. Vidas Kubilius | 3,131 | 0.31 | +0.31 |
| Christian Democrats | 1. Bruno Colangelo; 2. Noelene Hunt | 1,486 | 0.15 | +0.15 |
| Liberty & Democracy | 1. David McAlary; 2. Mark Hill | 798 | 0.08 | +0.08 |
| Socialist Alliance | 1. Renfrey Clarke; 2. Liah Lazarou | 770 | 0.08 | −0.05 |
| Senator On-Line | 1. Joel Clark; 2. Courtney Clarke | 610 | 0.06 | +0.06 |
| Secular | 1. Brian Paterson; 2. A. Brook | 577 | 0.06 | +0.06 |
| Citizens Electoral Council | 1. Martin Vincent; 2. Paul Siebert | 267 | 0.03 | +0.03 |
| Independent | Michelle Drummond | 101 | 0.01 | +0.01 |
| Independent | Stewart Glass | 73 | 0.01 | +0.01 |
| Total formal votes | | 1,006,809 | 97.62 | +1.15 |
| Informal votes | | 24,511 | 2.38 | −1.15 |
| Turnout | | 1,031,320 | 95.83 | +0.47 |

Both major parties finished with around 35% each, with Independent Nick Xenophon at almost 15% followed by the Greens on over 6%. The Liberals and Labor won two seats each whilst Xenophon won a seat on primary vote alone. Preferences from the What Women Want (Australia) Party and the Climate Change Coalition allowed the Greens to go ahead of all parties. This was followed by preferences from the Democratic Labor Party and Family First going to the Liberals, which allowed the Coalition to go ahead of the Greens. However, the Greens managed to crucially stay ahead of Labor, which led to preferences from Labor going to the Greens. This was enough for Greens candidate Sarah Hanson-Young winning the remaining seat. The final result was two seats to the Liberals, two seats to Labor, one seat to Xenophon and one seat to the Greens

==== 2004 ====
| Elected | # | Senator | Party |
| 2004 | 1 | Nick Minchin | Liberal |
| 2004 | 2 | Anne McEwen | Labor |
| 2004 | 3 | Amanda Vanstone | Liberal |
| 2004 | 4 | Annette Hurley | Labor |
| 2004 | 5 | Alan Ferguson | Liberal |
| 2004 | 6 | Dana Wortley | Labor |
2001
| 2001 | 1 | Robert Hill | Liberal |
| 2001 | 2 | Penny Wong | Labor |
| 2001 | 3 | Jeannie Ferris | Liberal |
| 2001 | 4 | Linda Kirk | Labor |
| 2001 | 5 | Grant Chapman | Liberal |
| 2001 | 6 | Natasha Stott Despoja | Democrats |

2004 Australian federal election: Senate, South Australia
| Party | Candidate | Votes | % | ±% |
|---|---|---|---|---|
| Quota | | 138,249 | | |
| Liberal | 1. Nick Minchin (elected 1); 2. Amanda Vanstone (elected 3); 3. Alan Ferguson (elected 5); 4. Sue Lawrie | 459,560 | 47.49 | +1.94 |
| Labor | 1. Anne McEwen (elected 2); 2. Annette Hurley (elected 4); 3. Dana Wortley (elected 6) | 343,422 | 35.49 | +2.25 |
| Greens | 1. Brian Noone; 2. Clare McCarty; 3. Mij Tanith; 4. Sandy Montgomery | 63,881 | 6.60 | +3.15 |
| Family First | 1. Andrea Mason; 2. Tony Bates; 3. Toni Turnbull | 38,559 | 3.98 | +3.98 |
| Democrats | 1. John McLaren; 2. Ruth Russell; 3. Tammy Franks; 4. Jenny Scott | 23,118 | 2.39 | −10.23 |
| Progressive Alliance | 1. Meg Lees; 2. Kirk Jones; 3. Jenny Macintosh | 11,061 | 1.14 | +1.14 |
| One Nation | 1. Andrew Phillips; 2. Basil Hille | 10,995 | 1.14 | −3.42 |
| National | 1. John Venus; 2. Julie Sippo; 3. Ian Willcourt | 3,843 | 0.40 | +0.40 |
| Veterans | 1. Nicholas McShane; 2. Jarrad Kay | 3,771 | 0.39 | +0.39 |
| Liberals for Forests | 1. Rita Hunt; 2. Rachael Barons | 2,800 | 0.29 | +0.29 |
| Group A | 1. Rolf Klotz; 2. Mark Smith; 3. Robyn Munro; 4. Ivan May | 1,957 | 0.20 | +0.20 |
| Socialist Alliance | 1. Tom Burtuleit; 2. Amy McDonald | 1,255 | 0.13 | +0.13 |
| Group M | 1. Ben Yengi; 2. Alan Hutton | 890 | 0.09 | +0.09 |
| Group P | 1. Ralph Hahnheuser; 2. Benno Lang | 889 | 0.09 | +0.09 |
| Group C | 1. Andrew Stanko; 2. Damian Woodards | 657 | 0.07 | +0.07 |
| Independent | Richard Armour | 437 | 0.05 | +0.05 |
| Group B | 1. Kane Winther; 2. Claire Winther | 402 | 0.04 | +0.04 |
| Independent | John Lawrie | 126 | 0.01 | +0.01 |
| Independent | Richard Lutz | 115 | 0.01 | +0.01 |
| Total formal votes | | 967,738 | 96.47 | −0.47 |
| Informal votes | | 35,424 | 3.53 | +0.47 |
| Turnout | | 1,003,162 | 95.36 | −0.86 |

Primary votes saw three Liberal seats and two Labor seats secured. With South Australia being the former constituent of former Democrats leader now Progressive Alliance leader Meg Lees, the state saw the largest swing against the Democrats and the largest total for the Progressive Alliance. ABC Election Analyst Antony Green suggested that had the Democrats done better in the primary vote in South Australia, they may have won the final senate seat on Family First preferences. Instead, the Democrat preferences saw Family First go ahead of the Greens, leading to Labor winning the seat on Green preferences. The result was three seats Liberal and three seats Labor.

==== 2001 ====
| Elected | # | Senator | Party |
| 2001 | 1 | Robert Hill | Liberal |
| 2001 | 2 | Penny Wong | Labor |
| 2001 | 3 | Jeannie Ferris | Liberal |
| 2001 | 4 | Linda Kirk | Labor |
| 2001 | 5 | Grant Chapman | Liberal |
| 2001 | 6 | Natasha Stott Despoja | Democrats |
1998
| 1998 | 1 | Amanda Vanstone | Liberal |
| 1998 | 2 | Nick Bolkus | Labor |
| 1998 | 3 | Nick Minchin | Liberal |
| 1998 | 4 | John Quirke | Labor |
| 1998 | 5 | Meg Lees | Democrats |
| 1998 | 6 | Alan Ferguson | Liberal |

2001 Australian federal election: Senate, South Australia
| Party | Candidate | Votes | % | ±% |
|---|---|---|---|---|
| Quota | | 138,146 | | |
| Liberal | 1. Robert Hill (elected 1); 2. Jeannie Ferris (elected 3); 3. Grant Chapman (elected 5); 4. Michelle Lensink | 440,537 | 45.53 | +5.0 |
| Labor | 1. Penny Wong (elected 2); 2. Linda Kirk (elected 4); 3. Chris Schacht | 321,551 | 33.23 | −1.3 |
| Democrats | 1. Natasha Stott Despoja (elected 6); 2. Jeff Heath; 3. Michael Pilling; 4. Haroon Hassan | 122,195 | 12.63 | +0.3 |
| One Nation | 1. Neil Russell-Taylor; 2. Colin Gibson | 44,080 | 4.56 | −5.0 |
| Greens | 1. Cate Faehrmann; 2. Jim Douglas | 33,439 | 3.46 | +1.3 |
| Republican | 1. Patrick Crozier; 2. Robert Easson | 1,917 | 0.20 | +0.20 |
| Group D | 1. Kathy Newnam; 2. Lisa Lines | 1,171 | 0.12 | +0.12 |
| Group G | 1. Kerry Harte; 2. Colin Phillips | 886 | 0.09 | +0.09 |
| Group F | 1. Mark Aldridge; 2. Helen Aldridge | 750 | 0.08 | +0.08 |
| Independent | Kym Fishlock | 596 | 0.06 | +0.06 |
| Independent | Nicholas McShane | 309 | 0.03 | +0.03 |
| Citizens Electoral Council | Ervyn Behn | 106 | 0.01 | +0.00 |
| Total formal votes | | 967,015 | 96.94 | −0.25 |
| Informal votes | | 30,561 | 3.06 | +0.25 |
| Turnout | | 997,576 | 96.22 | −0.58 |

=== Elections in the 1990s ===
==== 1998 ====
| Elected | # | Senator | Party |
1998
| 1998 | 1 | Amanda Vanstone | Liberal |
| 1998 | 2 | Nick Bolkus | Labor |
| 1998 | 3 | Nick Minchin | Liberal |
| 1998 | 4 | John Quirke | Labor |
| 1998 | 5 | Meg Lees | Democrats |
| 1998 | 6 | Alan Ferguson | Liberal |
1996
| 1996 | 1 | Robert Hill | Liberal |
| 1996 | 2 | Rosemary Crowley | Labor |
| 1996 | 3 | Natasha Stott Despoja | Democrats |
| 1996 | 4 | Grant Chapman | Liberal |
| 1996 | 5 | Chris Schacht | Labor |
| 1996 | 6 | Jeannie Ferris | Liberal |

1998 Australian federal election: Senate, South Australia
| Party | Candidate | Votes | % | ±% |
|---|---|---|---|---|
| Quota | | 135,260 | | |
| Liberal | 1. Amanda Vanstone (elected 1); 2. Nick Minchin (elected 3); 3. Alan Ferguson (elected 6); 4. Joy De Leo | 383,637 | 40.5 | −5.3 |
| Labor | 1. Nick Bolkus (elected 2); 2. John Quirke (elected 4); 3. Bill Hender | 303,299 | 32.0 | −0.2 |
| Democrats | 1. Meg Lees (elected 5); 2. Michael Pilling; 3. Alex Bowie; 4. Natalija Apponyi | 117,619 | 12.4 | −2.1 |
| One Nation | 1. Len Spencer; 2. Malcolm Rumbelow; 3. Monica Reimann | 91,911 | 9.7 | +9.7 |
| Greens | 1. Craig Wilkins; 2. Michelle Drummond | 20,895 | 2.2 | +0.2 |
| Christian Democrats | 1. Bob Randall; 2. Colin Sinclair | 9,598 | 1.0 | +0.3 |
| Australia First | 1. Peter Davis; 2. Bill Fradd | 6,127 | 0.6 | +0.6 |
| National | 1. Ellis Wayland; Robin Dixon-Thompson | 4,445 | 0.5 | +0.5 |
| Democratic Socialist | 1. Melanie Sjoberg; 2. Kathy Newnam | 4,256 | 0.4 | +0.4 |
| Group E | 1. Chris Harms; 2. Kirsti Harms | 1,487 | 0.1 | +0.1 |
| Group L | 1. Bernice Pfitzner; 2. Erik Eriksen; 3. Sean Heylen | 1,466 | 0.1 | +0.1 |
| Citizens Electoral Council | 1. Tommy Tonkin; 2. Pompeo Feleppa | 898 | 0.1 | +0.1 |
| Group D | 1. Lindsay Simmons; 2. Pat Brown | 625 | 0.1 | +0.1 |
| Independent | Neil Russell-Taylor | 309 | 0.0 | 0.0 |
| Independent | Graham Neave | 245 | 0.0 | 0.0 |
| Total formal votes | | 946,816 | 97.2 | +0.5 |
| Informal votes | | 27,424 | 2.8 | −0.5 |
| Turnout | | 974,240 | 96.8 | +0.4 |

==== 1996 ====
| Elected | # | Senator | Party |
1996
| 1996 | 1 | Robert Hill | Liberal |
| 1996 | 2 | Rosemary Crowley | Labor |
| 1996 | 3 | Natasha Stott Despoja | Democrats |
| 1996 | 4 | Grant Chapman | Liberal |
| 1996 | 5 | Chris Schacht | Labor |
| 1996 | 6 | Jeannie Ferris | Liberal |
1993
| 1993 | 1 | Amanda Vanstone | Liberal |
| 1993 | 2 | Nick Bolkus | Labor |
| 1993 | 3 | Nick Minchin | Liberal |
| 1993 | 4 | Dominic Foreman | Labor |
| 1993 | 5 | Alan Ferguson | Liberal |
| 1993 | 6 | Meg Lees | Democrats |

1996 Australian federal election: Senate, South Australia
| Party | Candidate | Votes | % | ±% |
|---|---|---|---|---|
| Quota | | 133,397 | | |
| Liberal | 1. Robert Hill (elected 1); 2. Grant Chapman (elected 4); 3. Jeannie Ferris (elected 6); 4. Maria Kortesis | 428,053 | 45.8 | +0.1 |
| Labor | 1. Rosemary Crowley (elected 2); 2. Chris Schacht (elected 5); 3. Deirdre Tedmanson | 301,094 | 32.2 | −5.8 |
| Democrats | 1. Natasha Stott Despoja (elected 3); 2. Ian Gilfillan; 3. Judy Smith; 4. Desea Tsagatos | 135,730 | 14.5 | +4.7 |
| Greens | 1. Stephen Spence; 2. Meryl McDougall | 19,441 | 2.0 | +0.4 |
| AAFI | 1. Bert Joy; 2. Stephen Wikblom | 9,424 | 1.0 | +1.0 |
| Shooters | 1. Haydon Aldersey; 2. Robert Low | 8,973 | 1.0 | +1.0 |
| Grey Power | 1. Emily Gilbey-Riley; 2. Gratton Darbyshire | 8,228 | 0.9 | +0.9 |
| Call to Australia | 1. David Rodway; 2. Brett Rodway | 6,817 | 0.7 | −0.4 |
| Group J | 1. Kenneth Nicholson; 2. Colin Shearing | 6,286 | 0.7 | +0.7 |
| Women's Party | 1. Deborah McCulloch; 2. Marg McHugh; 3. Denise Tzumli | 5,678 | 0.6 | +0.6 |
| Independent EFF | 1. David Dwyer; 2. Alfred Walker | 2,430 | 0.3 | +0.3 |
| Group F | 1. Michael Wohltmann; 2. Jeanette Wohltmann | 1,081 | 0.1 | +0.1 |
| Independent | Geoffrey Wells | 561 | 0.1 | +0.1 |
| Total formal votes | | 933,776 | 96.7 | −1.0 |
| Informal votes | | 31,552 | 3.3 | +1.0 |
| Turnout | | 965,328 | 96.4 | −0.9 |

==== 1993 ====
| Elected | # | Senator | Party |
|---|---|---|---|
| 1993 | 1 | Amanda Vanstone | Liberal |
| 1993 | 2 | Nick Bolkus | Labor |
| 1993 | 3 | Nick Minchin | Liberal |
| 1993 | 4 | Dominic Foreman | Labor |
| 1993 | 5 | Alan Ferguson | Liberal |
| 1993 | 6 | Meg Lees | Democrats |
| 1990 | 1 | Robert Hill | Liberal |
| 1990 | 2 | Rosemary Crowley | Labor |
| 1990 | 3 | John Coulter | Democrats |
| 1990 | 4 | Baden Teague | Liberal |
| 1990 | 5 | Chris Schacht | Labor |
| 1990 | 6 | Grant Chapman | Liberal |

1993 Australian federal election: Senate, South Australia
| Party | Candidate | Votes | % | ±% |
|---|---|---|---|---|
| Quota | | 135,140 | | |
| Liberal | 1. Amanda Vanstone (elected 1); 2. Nick Minchin (elected 3); 3. Alan Ferguson (elected 5); 4. Satish Gupta | 431,642 | 45.6 | +4.1 |
| Labor | 1. Nick Bolkus (elected 2); 2. Dominic Foreman (elected 4); 3. Graham Maguire; 4. Rosalie McDonald | 359,491 | 38.0 | +0.9 |
| Democrats | 1. Meg Lees (elected 6); 2. Stephen Swift; 3. Natasha Stott Despoja; 4. Patricia Tickle | 93,325 | 9.8 | −6.5 |
| Greens | 1. Ally Fricker; 2. Gerhard Weissmann | 15,467 | 1.6 | −0.5 |
| Call to Australia | 1. David Rodway; 2. David Squirrell | 10,762 | 1.1 | −1.0 |
| Natural Law | 1. Geoff Wells; 2. Anne Martin; 3. Dulcie Morris | 6,936 | 0.7 | +0.7 |
| Grey Power | 1. Jack Holder; 2. Betty Preston; 3. Glen Bottam | 6,922 | 0.6 | +0.6 |
| Independent EFF | 1. David Dwyer; 2. Douglas Giddings; 3. Vanessa Giddings | 6,031 | 0.6 | +0.6 |
| National | 1. Nola McCallum; 2. Michael Bradshaw | 4,498 | 0.5 | +0.1 |
| Republican | 1. Bilal Nasrullah; 2. Peter Hill | 4,191 | 0.4 | +0.4 |
| AAFI | 1. Evonne Moore; 2. Joe Smith | 3,597 | 0.3 | +0.3 |
| Group F | 1. Alex Liew; 2. Douglas Schirripa | 2,716 | 0.3 | +0.3 |
| Independent | Mark Rice | 313 | 0.0 | 0.0 |
| Independent | Ean Smith | 53 | 0.0 | 0.0 |
| Independent | Bernard Broom | 31 | 0.0 | 0.0 |
| Total formal votes | | 945,975 | 97.7 | +0.2 |
| Informal votes | | 22,390 | 2.3 | −0.2 |
| Turnout | | 968,365 | 95.5 | −0.9 |

==== 1990 ====
| Elected | # | Senator | Party |
|---|---|---|---|
1990
| 1990 | 1 | Robert Hill | Liberal |
| 1990 | 2 | Rosemary Crowley | Labor |
| 1990 | 3 | John Coulter | Democrats |
| 1990 | 4 | Baden Teague | Liberal |
| 1990 | 5 | Chris Schacht | Labor |
| 1990 | 6 | Grant Chapman | Liberal |
1987
| 1987 | 1 | Dominic Foreman | Labor |
| 1987 | 2 | John Olsen | Liberal |
| 1987 | 3 | Meg Lees | Democrats |
| 1987 | 4 | Nick Bolkus | Labor |
| 1987 | 5 | Amanda Vanstone | Liberal |
| 1987 | 6 | Graham Maguire | Labor |

1990 Australian federal election: Senate, South Australia
| Party | Candidate | Votes | % | ±% |
|---|---|---|---|---|
| Quota | | 129,732 | | |
| Liberal | 1. Robert Hill (elected 1); 2. Baden Teague (elected 4); 3. Grant Chapman (elected 6); 4. Ivan Venning | 376,073 | 42.6 | +0.1 |
| Labor | 1. Rosemary Crowley (elected 2); 2. Chris Schacht (elected 5); 3. Gay Thompson; 4. Jim Hyde | 337,137 | 37.1 | −7.5 |
| Democrats | 1. John Coulter (elected 3); 2. Graham Pamount; 3. Judy Smith; 4. Pat Macaskill | 149,158 | 16.3 | +8.5 |
| Green Alliance | 1. Deborah White; 2. Philippa Skinner; 3. Colin Hunt | 19,499 | 2.1 | +1.2 |
| Call to Australia | 1. David Squirrell; 2. Colin Sinclair | 18,701 | 2.1 | +2.1 |
| National | 1. Neville Agars; 2. Gary Hamdorf | 3,667 | 0.4 | −3.1 |
| Grey Power | Jack Holder | 1,514 | 0.2 | +0.2 |
| Group B | 1. Tania Mykyta; 2. Lizz Higgins | 1,091 | 0.1 | +0.1 |
| Group F | 1. F Rieck; 2. Heather Shephard | 928 | 0.1 | +0.1 |
| Independent | Anastasios Giannouklas | 187 | 0.0 | 0.0 |
| Independent | Jack King | 168 | 0.0 | 0.0 |
| Total formal votes | | 908,123 | 97.5 | +1.3 |
| Informal votes | | 23,438 | 2.5 | −1.3 |
| Turnout | | 931,561 | 96.4 | +1.9 |

=== Elections in the 1980s ===
==== 1987 ====
1987 Australian federal election: Senate, South Australia
| Party | Candidate | Votes | % | ±% |
|---|---|---|---|---|
| Quota | | 65,927 | | |
| Labor | 1. Dominic Foreman (elected 1); 2. Nick Bolkus (elected 4); 3. Graham Maguire (elected 6); 4. Rosemary Crowley (elected 8); 5. Chris Schacht (elected 10); 6. Vic Heron; 7. Rosalie McDonald | 354,747 | 41.4 | −0.3 |
| Liberal | 1. Tony Messner (elected 2); 2. Amanda Vanstone (elected 5); 3. Robert Hill (elected 7); 4. Grant Chapman (elected 9); 5. Baden Teague (elected 11); 6. Michele Mercurio; 7. Ivan Venning | 328,039 | 38.3 | +0.8 |
| Democrats | 1. Janine Haines (elected 3); 2. John Coulter (elected 12); 3. Meg Lees; 4. Ian McLiesh; 5. Peter Vervoorn | 95,831 | 11.2 | 0.0 |
| National | 1. Bill Wright; 2. Neville Agars; 3. Mike Rogers; 4. Jessie Taylor; 5. Bob Brown; 6. Clifford Boyd | 29,954 | 3.5 | +2.2 |
| Independent | Don Jessop | 25,876 | 3.0 | +3.0 |
| Greens | 1. Ally Fricker; 2. Jules Davison | 8,102 | 0.9 | +0.9 |
| Group A | 1. Creston Magasdi; 2. Reg McColl | 5,715 | 0.7 | +0.7 |
| Unite Australia | 1. David Vigor; 2. Nick Theologou; 3. Patricia Prowse; 4. Maxwell Elphick | 4,775 | 0.6 | +0.6 |
| Communist | 1. John Wishart; 2. Linda Gale | 2,456 | 0.3 | +0.3 |
| Group F | 1. Tom Towle; 2. Ellen Towle | 788 | 0.1 | +0.1 |
| Independent | Bill Forster | 276 | 0.0 | 0.0 |
| Independent | Rob Robertson | 199 | 0.0 | 0.0 |
| Independent | Robert Worth | 145 | 0.0 | 0.0 |
| Independent | John Out | 47 | 0.0 | 0.0 |
| Independent | Helen Launer | 44 | 0.0 | 0.0 |
| Independent | Syd Plenty | 29 | 0.0 | 0.0 |
| Independent | Stephen Bailey | 19 | 0.0 | 0.0 |
| Total formal votes | | 857,042 | 96.2 | +1.6 |
| Informal votes | | 33,514 | 3.8 | −1.6 |
| Turnout | | 890,556 | 94.5 | −0.7 |

| # | Senator | Party |
| 1 | Dominic Foreman | Labor |
| 2 | Tony Messner | Liberal |
| 3 | Janine Haines | Democrats |
| 4 | Nick Bolkus | Labor |
| 5 | Amanda Vanstone | Liberal |
| 6 | Graham Maguire | Labor |
| 7 | Robert Hill | Liberal |
| 8 | Rosemary Crowley | Labor |
| 9 | Grant Chapman | Liberal |
| 10 | Chris Schacht | Labor |
| 11 | Baden Teague | Liberal |
| 12 | John Coulter | Democrats |

==== 1984 ====
| Elected | # | Senator | Party |
|---|---|---|---|
1985
| 1985 | 1 | Nick Bolkus | Labor |
| 1985 | 2 | Baden Teague | Liberal |
| 1985 | 3 | Graham Maguire | Labor |
| 1985 | 4 | Don Jessop | Liberal |
| 1985 | 5 | Rosemary Crowley | Labor |
| 1985 | 6 | Amanda Vanstone | Liberal |
| 1985 | 7 | David Vigor | Democrats |
1982
| 1982 | 1 | Ron Elstob | Labor |
| 1982 | 2 | Tony Messner | Liberal |
| 1982 | 3 | Janine Haines | Democrats |
| 1982 | 4 | Dominic Foreman | Labor |
| 1982 | 5 | Robert Hill | Liberal |

1984 Australian federal election: Senate, South Australia
| Party | Candidate | Votes | % | ±% |
|---|---|---|---|---|
| Quota | | 101,997 | | |
| Labor | 1. Nick Bolkus (elected 1); 2. Graham Maguire (elected 3); 3. Rosemary Crowley (elected 5); 4. Vic Heron | 340,115 | 41.7 | −2.9 |
| Liberal | 1. Baden Teague (elected 2); 2. Don Jessop (elected 4); 3. Amanda Vanstone (elected 6); 4. Robert Giles | 306,027 | 37.5 | −2.9 |
| Democrats | 1. David Vigor (elected 7); 2. John Coulter; 3. Mike Elliott; 4. Sandra Kanck | 91,329 | 11.2 | −0.9 |
| Nuclear Disarmament | 1. Frances Mowling; 2. Ian Modistach; 3. Douglas Peers | 37,834 | 4.6 | +4.6 |
| Call to Australia | 1. Bob Brown; 2. Dean Davis; 3. William Pomery | 22,429 | 2.7 | +2.7 |
| National | 1. John Bannon; 2. Judith Jackson; 3. Ray Rothe; 4. Helen Scott; 5. Audrey Pobke | 10,756 | 1.3 | −0.4 |
| Pensioner | 1. Wilfred Scott; 2. Kenneth Perry | 4,052 | 0.5 | +0.5 |
| Group F | 1. Judy Gillett; 2. Brian Sones; 3. Eugene Sibelle | 1,328 | 0.2 | +0.2 |
| Group D | 1. Joe Rossi; 2. Warwick Stallard; 3. Giovanni Melino; 4. Gizella Farkas | 840 | 0.1 | +0.1 |
| Family Movement | 1. Bob Boyd; 2. Fred Tanner | 800 | 0.1 | +0.1 |
| Independent | Herman Bersee | 199 | 0.0 | 0.0 |
| Independent | Peter Gagliardi | 169 | 0.0 | 0.0 |
| Independent | Edward Dyer | 92 | 0.0 | 0.0 |
| Total formal votes | | 815,970 | 94.6 | +3.4 |
| Informal votes | | 46,399 | 5.4 | −3.4 |
| Turnout | | 862,369 | 95.2 | +0.2 |

==== 1983 ====
1983 Australian federal election: Senate, South Australia
| Party | Candidate | Votes | % | ±% |
|---|---|---|---|---|
| Quota | | 69,396 | | |
| Labor | 1. Ron Elstob (elected 1); 2. Dominic Foreman (elected 4); 3. Nick Bolkus (elected 6); 4. Graham Maguire (elected 8); 5. Rosemary Crowley (elected 10); 6. Brian Keneally | 340,089 | 44.6 | +3.8 |
| Liberal | 1. Tony Messner (elected 2); 2. Robert Hill (elected 5); 3. Don Jessop (elected 7); 4. Baden Teague (elected 9); 5. Harold Young; 6. Graham Ingerson | 308,138 | 40.4 | −2.9 |
| Democrats | 1. Janine Haines (elected 3); 2. Ted Radoslovich; 3. Margaret-Ann Williams; 4. David Vigor; 5. John Beech; 6. Patricia Shortridge | 96,662 | 13.1 | +1.9 |
| National | 1. Kevin Schulz; 2. William Nosworthy; 3. Stanley Draganoff | 13,757 | 1.8 | +0.8 |
| Integrity Team | 1. Betty Luks; 2. Barry Lindner; 3. Belle Harris; 4. John Wadey | 4,026 | 0.5 | +0.5 |
| Communist | 1. Anne McMenamin; 2. John Humphrys | 1,058 | 0.1 | +0.1 |
| Libertarian | William Forster | 959 | 0.1 | +0.1 |
| Socialist | 1. Brian Rooney; 2. Laurence Kiek | 864 | 0.1 | +0.1 |
| Socialist Workers | 1. Douglas Lorimer; 2. Jennifer Fisher | 795 | 0.1 | +0.1 |
| Independent | Colin George | 777 | 0.1 | +0.1 |
| Social Democrats | 1. Roger Ormsby; 2. John Parker | 301 | 0.0 | 0.0 |
| Total formal votes | | 763,349 | 91.2 | −0.1 |
| Informal votes | | 73,350 | 8.8 | +0.1 |
| Turnout | | 836,699 | 95.0 | +0.1 |

| # | Senator | Party |
| 1 | Ron Elstob | Labor |
| 2 | Tony Messner | Liberal |
| 3 | Janine Haines | Democrat |
| 4 | Dominic Foreman | Labor |
| 5 | Robert Hill | Liberal |
| 6 | Nick Bolkus | Labor |
| 7 | Don Jessop | Liberal |
| 8 | Graham Maguire | Labor |
| 9 | Baden Teague | Liberal |
| 10 | Rosemary Crowley | Labor |

==== 1980 ====
| Elected | # | Senator | Party |
|---|---|---|---|
1981
| 1981 | 1 | Don Jessop | Liberal |
| 1981 | 2 | Dominic Foreman | Labor |
| 1981 | 3 | Robert Hill | Liberal |
| 1981 | 4 | Nick Bolkus | Labor |
| 1981 | 5 | Janine Haines | Democrat |
1978
| 1978 | 1 | Tony Messner | Liberal |
| 1978 | 2 | Geoff McLaren | Labor |
| 1978 | 3 | Harold Young | Liberal |
| 1978 | 4 | Ron Elstob | Labor |
| 1978 | 5 | Baden Teague | Liberal |

1980 Australian federal election, Senate, South Australia
| Party | Candidate | Votes | % | ±% |
|---|---|---|---|---|
| Quota | | 122,723 | | |
| Liberal | 1. Don Jessop (elected 1); 2. Robert Hill (elected 3); 3. Craig Spiel | 319,088 | 43.3 | −5.8 |
| Labor | 1. Dominic Foreman (elected 2); 2. Nick Bolkus (elected 4); 3. Graham Maguire | 300,420 | 40.8 | +4.0 |
| Democrats | 1. Janine Haines (elected 5); 2. Ian Gilfillan; 3. David Vigor | 96,662 | 13.1 | +1.9 |
| National Country | 1. Geoffrey Clothier; 2. Sylvia Schulz; 3. Peter McBride | 7,419 | 1.0 | +1.0 |
| Concerned Christian Candidates | 1. Betty Luks; 2. James Cronin; 3. Gordon Kroschel | 4,189 | 0.6 | +0.6 |
| Marijuana | 1. Craig Cocks; 2. Gwenda Woods | 2,373 | 0.3 | +0.3 |
| Australia | 1. Ian Modistach; 2. Alan Jamieson | 1,670 | 0.2 | −0.2 |
| Socialist | 1. Brian Rooney; 2. Ida Goss; 3. Laurence Kiek | 1,347 | 0.2 | −0.1 |
| Progressive Conservative | 1. David Kitto; 2. Mary McKenzie-Huish | 1,248 | 0.2 | +0.2 |
| Independent | Valentine Furner | 879 | 0.1 | +0.1 |
| Independent | William Forster | 820 | 0.1 | +0.1 |
| Independent | Raymond Bradtke | 221 | 0.0 | 0.0 |
| Total formal votes | | 736,336 | 91.3 | +1.7 |
| Informal votes | | 70,359 | 8.7 | −1.7 |
| Turnout | | 806,695 | 94.9 | −0.2 |

=== Elections in the 1910s ===
==== 1914 ====
Each elector voted for up to six candidates. Percentages refer to the number of voters rather than the number of votes.

1914 Australian federal election: Senate, South Australia
| Party | Candidate | Votes | % | ±% |
|---|---|---|---|---|
| Liberal | John Shannon (elected 1) | 190,590 | 96.1 (Note: John Shannon was included on the Labor ticket.) | |
| Labor | John Newlands (re-elected 2) | 112,569 | 56.8 | +4.6 (Note: Change compared to the personal vote at the 1913 election.) |
| Labor | James O'Loghlin (re-elected 3) | 112,283 | 56.6 | +4.1 |
| Labor | Robert Guthrie (re-elected 4) | 111,774 | 56.4 | +2.4 (Note: Change compared to the personal vote at the 1910 election.) |
| Labor | William Senior (re-elected 5) | 109,975 | 55.5 | +4.4 |
| Labor | William Story (re-elected 6) | 108,263 | 54.6 | +8.1 |
| Liberal | Edward Vardon | 90,364 | 45.6 | |
| Liberal | Benjamin Benny | 89,568 | 45.2 | |
| Liberal | George Jenkins | 89,194 | 45.0 | |
| Liberal | George Stewart | 88,042 | 44.4 | |
| Liberal | Patrick Daley | 87,365 | 44.1 | |
| Total formal votes | | 1,189,987; 198,331 voters | 96.16 | +1.90 |
| Informal votes | | 7,913 | 3.84 | −1.90 |
| Turnout | | 206,244 | 80.14 | +0.04 |
Party total votes
| Liberal | | 635,123 | 53.37 | +6.97 |
| Labor | | 554,864 | 46.63 | −6.97 |

Sitting senator Gregor McGregor (Labor) had re-nominated but died after the close of nominations, leaving Labor with only 5 candidates. Electors were required to vote for 6 candidates or their vote would be invalid. If there was a large informal vote or if the surplus votes were equally distributed there was a risk of Labor losing more than one seat. Labor therefore asked its supporters to vote for John Shannon (Liberal).

==== 1913 ====
Each elector voted for up to three candidates. Percentages refer to the number of voters rather than the number of votes.

1913 Australian federal election: Senate, South Australia
| Party | Candidate | Votes | % | ±% |
|---|---|---|---|---|
| Labour | James O'Loghlin (elected 1) | 96,750 | 52.5 | |
| Labour | John Newlands (elected 2) | 96,179 | 52.2 | |
| Labour | William Senior (elected 3) | 94,222 | 51.1 | |
| Liberal | Joseph Vardon (defeated) | 82,829 | 45.0 | −1.5 (Note: Change compared to the personal vote at the 1906 election.) |
| Liberal | John Shannon (defeated) | 82,436 | 44.7 | (Note: John Shannon (Liberal) had been appointed to replace William Russell (Labour) who died on 28 June 1912.) |
| Liberal | Peter Allen | 81,805 | 44.4 | |
| Independent | Sir Josiah Symon (defeated) | 18,556 | 10.1 | −1.7 |
| Total formal votes | | 552,777; 184,259 voters | 94.3 | −2.4 |
| Informal votes | | 11,204 | 5.7 | +2.4 |
| Turnout | | 195,463 | 80.1 | +26.9 |
Party total votes
| Labour | | 287,151 | 51.9 | −1.7 |
| Liberal | | 247,070 | 44.7 | −1.7 |
| Independent | | 18,556 | 10.1 | |

==== 1910 ====
Each elector voted for up to three candidates. Percentages refer to the number of voters rather than the number of votes.

1910 Australian federal election: Senate, South Australia
| Party | Candidate | Votes | % | ±% |
|---|---|---|---|---|
| Labour | Gregor McGregor (re-elected 1) | 58,955 | 55.2 | −2.8 (Note: Change compared to the personal vote at the 1903 election.) |
| Labour | Robert Guthrie (re-elected 2) | 57,733 | 54.0 | +1.0 |
| Labour | William Story (re-elected 3) | 31,489 | 46.5 | +8.5 |
| Liberal | David Gordon | 50,729 | 47.5 | |
| Liberal | David Charleston | 49,063 | 45.9 | +0.7 |
| Liberal | John Shannon | 48,834 | 45.7 | |
| Total formal votes | | 320,484; 106,828 voters | 96.7 | +0.6 |
| Informal votes | | 3,675 | 3.3 | −0.6 |
| Turnout | | 70,517 | 53.2 | +16.7 |
Party total votes
| Labour | | 171,858 | 53.6 | +7.1 |
| Liberal | | 148,626 | 46.4 | −0.7 (Note: Change compared to the combined Anti-Socialist and Protectionist vote at the 1906 election.) |

=== Elections in the 1900s ===
==== 1906 ====
Each elector voted for up to three candidates. Percentages refer to the number of voters rather than the number of votes.

1906 Australian federal election: Senate, South Australia
| Party | Candidate | Votes | % | ±% |
|---|---|---|---|---|
| Anti-Socialist | Sir Josiah Symon (re-elected 1) | 33,597 | 49.6 | |
| Labour | William Russell (elected 2) | 31,796 | 46.9 | |
| Anti-Socialist | Joseph Vardon (elected 3) (Note: The election of Anti-Socialist senator Joseph Vardon was declared void on 31 May 1907.) | 31,489 | 46.5 | |
| Labour | Dugald Crosby | 31,455 | 46.4 | |
| Labour | Reginald Blundell | 31,366 | 46.3 | |
| Anti-Socialist | David Charleston | 30,608 | 45.2 | |
| Protectionist | Thomas Playford (defeated) | 13,035 | 19.2 | |
| Total formal votes | | 203,346; 67,782 voters | 96.1 | −1.7 |
| Informal votes | | 2,735 | 3.9 | +1.7 |
| Turnout | | 70,517 | 36.5 | |
Party total votes
| Anti-Socialist | | 95,684 | 47.1 | |
| Labour | | 94,617 | 46.5 | |
| Protectionist | | 13,035 | 6.4 | |

==== 1903 ====
Each elector voted for up to three candidates. Percentages refer to the number of voters rather than the number of votes.

1903 Australian federal election: Senate, South Australia
| Party | Candidate | Votes | % | ±% |
|---|---|---|---|---|
| Labour | Gregor McGregor (re-elected 1) | 31,082 | 58.0 | |
| Labour | Robert Guthrie (elected 2) | 28,376 | 53.0 | |
| Labour | William Story (elected 3) | 23,083 | 43.1 | |
| Free Trade | David Charleston (defeated) | 22,499 | 42.0 | |
| Free Trade | William Copley | 19,402 | 36.2 | |
| Free Trade | Robert Caldwell | 19,400 | 36.2 | |
| Independent | Crawford Vaughan | 8,595 | 16.0 | |
| Independent | William Grasby | 8,294 | 15.5 | |
| Total formal votes | | 160,731; 53,577 voters | 97.8 | |
| Informal votes | | 1,208 | 2.2 | |
| Turnout | | 53,577 | 32.4 | |
Party total votes
| Labour | | 82,541 | 51.4 | |
| Free Trade | | 61,301 | 38.1 | |
| Independent | | 16,889 | 10.5 | |

==== 1901 ====
Each elector voted for up to six candidates; as such percentages are shown of the total number of voters rather than the total number of votes.

1901 Australian federal election: Senate, South Australia
| Party | Candidate | Votes | % | ±% |
|---|---|---|---|---|
| Free Trade | Sir Josiah Symon (elected 1) | 37,642 | 74.8 | +74.8 |
| Protectionist | Thomas Playford (elected 2) | 36,892 | 73.3 | +73.3 |
| Free Trade | Sir Richard Baker (elected 3) | 35,235 | 70.0 | +70.0 |
| Protectionist | Sir John Downer (elected 4) | 30,493 | 60.6 | +60.6 |
| Free Trade | David Charleston (elected 5) | 29,153 | 57.9 | +57.9 |
| Labour | Gregor McGregor (elected 6) | 26,264 | 52.2 | +52.2 |
| Protectionist | Andrew Kirkpatrick | 25,620 | 50.9 | +50.9 |
| Labour | James O'Loghlin | 21,871 | 43.4 | +43.4 |
| Free Trade | Arthur Addison | 21,802 | 43.3 | +43.3 |
| Free Trade | William Copley | 20,807 | 41.3 | +41.3 |
| Protectionist | Thomas Burgoyne | 16,353 | 32.5 | +32.5 |
| Total formal votes | | 302,132; ~50,325 ballots | | |
| Informal votes | | 1,478 | | |
| Turnout | | unknown | | |
Party total votes
| Free Trade | | 144,639 | 47.9 | +47.9 |
| Protectionist | | 109,358 | 36.2 | +36.2 |
| Labour | | 48,135 | 15.9 | +15.9 |

== See also ==
- List of senators from South Australia
