= 1983 Australian Senate election =

Australian federal election results

1983 Australian Senate elections
← 1980	5 March 1983	1984 →

All 64 seats in the Australian Senate 33 seats needed for a majority
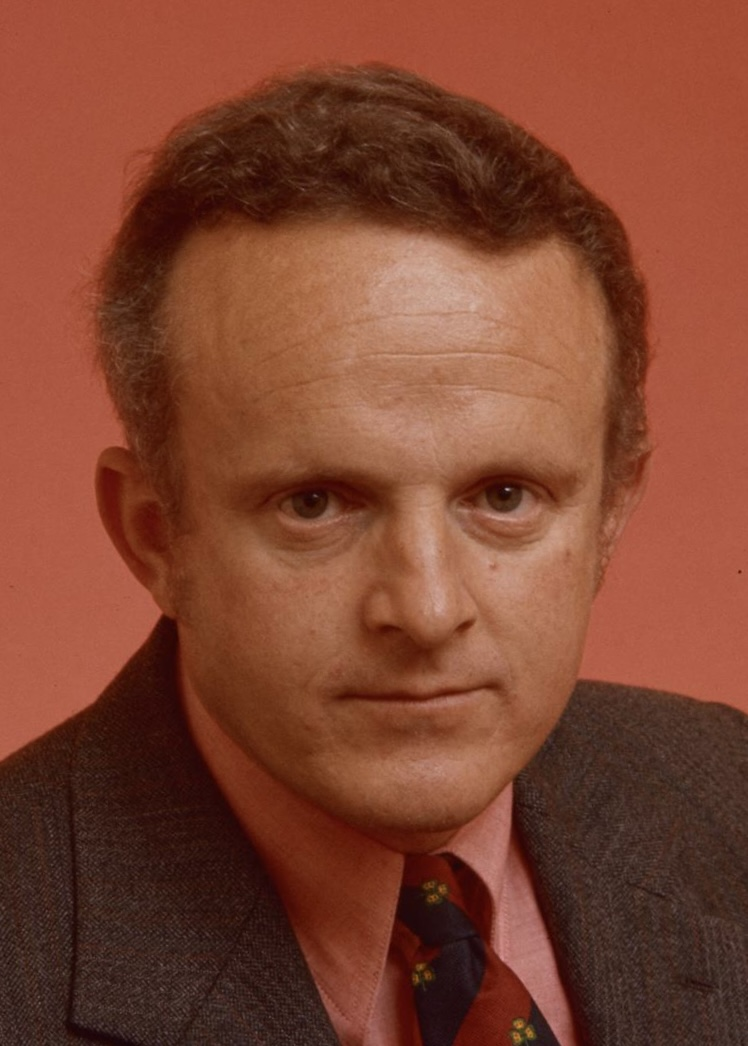

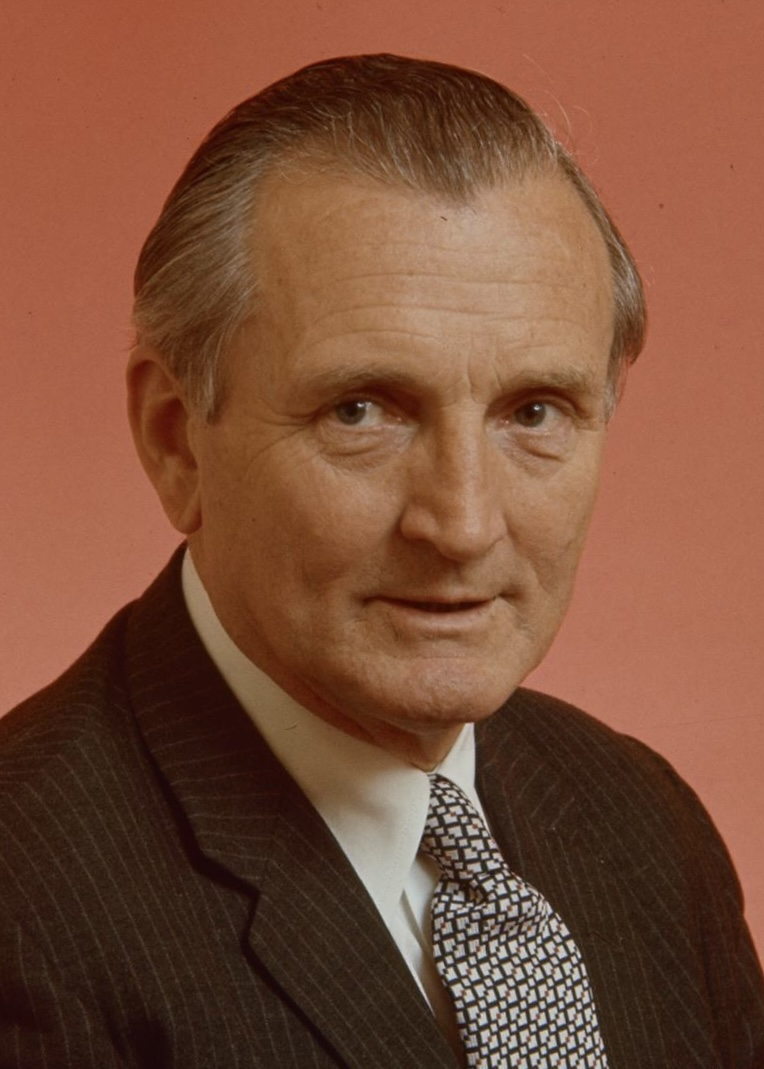

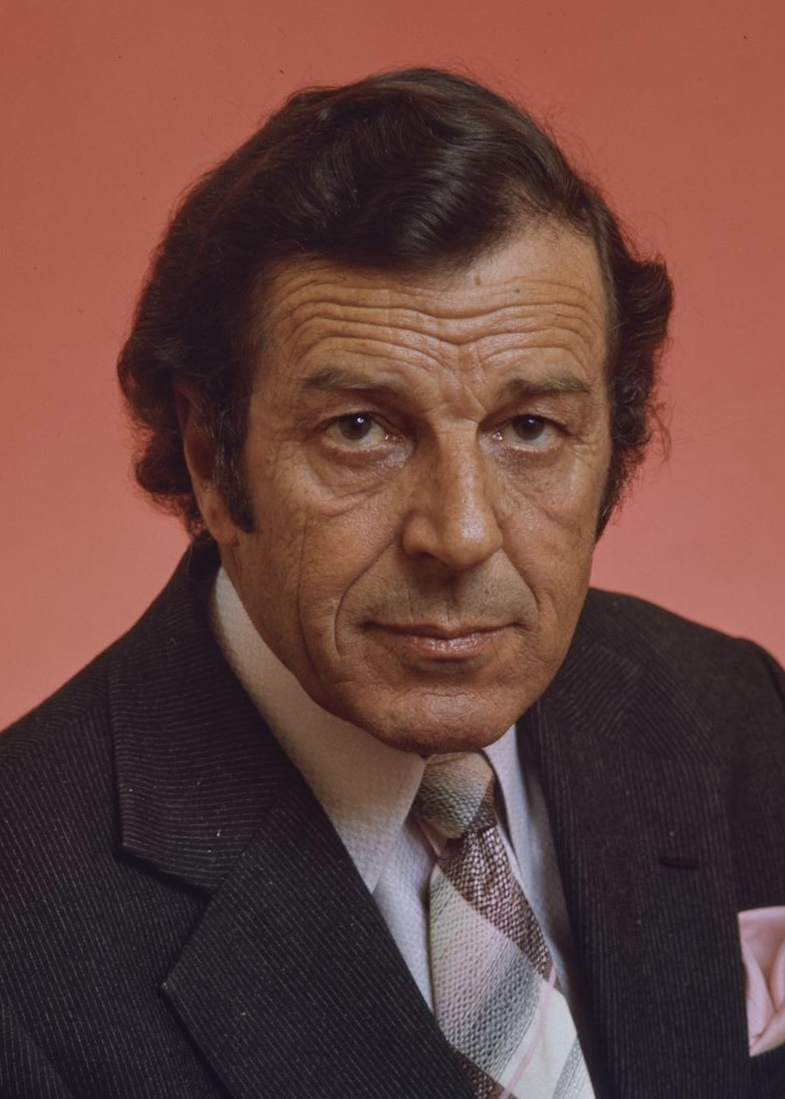
	First party	Second party	Third party
Leader	John Button	John Carrick	Don Chipp
Party	Labor	Liberal–National Coalition	Democrats
Leader since	7 November 1980	7 August 1978	9 May 1977
Leader's seat	Victoria	New South Wales	Victoria
Seats before	27	31	5
Seats after	30	28	5
Seat change	▲3	▼3	0
Popular vote	3,637,316	3,195,397	764,911
Percentage	45.49%	39.97 %	9.57%
Swing	▲3.24%	▼3.51%	▲0.31%
- Senators elected in the 1983 federal election
Leader of the Senate before election
John Carrick
Liberal/National coalition
Elected Leader of the Senate
John Button
Labor

The following tables show state-by-state results in the Australian Senate at the 1983 Australian federal election. Senators total 25 coalition (23 Liberal, one coalition National, one CLP), 30 Labor, three non-coalition National, five Democrats, and one Independent. Senate terms are six years (three for territories). As the election was the result of a double dissolution, all 64 senate seats were vacant. All elected senators took their seats immediately with a backdated starting date of 1 July 1982, except for the territorial senators who took their seats at the election. Half of the senators elected in each state were allocated 3-year terms (from 1 July 1982) to restore the rotation. It is the most recent federal Senate election won by the Labor Party.

== Australia ==
Senate (STV) — 1983–84—Turnout 94.64% (CV) — Informal 9.87%
Party	Votes	%	Swing	Seats won	Total seats	Change
Labor	3,637,316	45.49	+3.24	30	30	+3
Liberal–National coalition	3,195,397	39.97	–3.51	28	28	–3
Liberal–National joint ticket	1,861,618	23.28	−2.35	8	*	*
Liberal (separate ticket)	923,571	11.55	−1.59	16	23	–4
National (separate ticket)	388,802	4.86	+0.41	3	4	+1
Country Liberal	21,406	0.27	+0.02	1	1	0
Democrats	764,911	9.57	+0.31	5	5	0
Call to Australia	96,065					0
Progress Party	1,905					0
White Australia	1,025					0
Independents	193,454	2.42	+1.29	1	1	0
Other	203,967	2.55	−1.34	0	0	0
Total	7,995,045			64	64	

== New South Wales ==
1983 Australian federal election: Senate, New South Wales
Party	Candidate	Votes	%	±%
Quota		249,207		
Labor	1. Doug McClelland (elected 1); 2. Arthur Gietzelt (elected 3); 3. Graham Richardson (elected 5); 4. Kerry Sibraa (elected 7); 5. Bruce Childs (elected 9); 6. Sue West	1,298,672	47.4	+2.6
Coalition	1. John Carrick (Lib) (elected 2); 2. Peter Baume (Lib) (elected 4); 3. Douglas Scott (Nat) (elected 6); 4. Misha Lajovic (Lib) (elected 8); 5. Chris Puplick (Lib); 6. Doug Moppett (Nat)	1,045,502	38.1	–3.9
Democrats	1. Colin Mason (elected 10); 2. Paul McLean; 3. Christine Townend; 4. Megan Sampson; 5. Peter Hains; 6. Rodney Irvine	235,712	8.6	+1.7
Call to Australia	1. Clair Isbister; 2. John Whitehall; 3. Graham McLennan; 4. Kevin Hume; 5. Thomas Toogood; 6. Elaine Nile	96,065	3.5	–0.9
Group A	1. Ronald Weatherall; 2. Keith Gleeson	32,385	1.2	+1.2
Independent	Burnum Burnum	10,524	0.4	+0.4
Socialist	1. Peter Symon; 2. Harry Black; 3. Stratos Mavrantonis	3,656	0.1	+0.1
Independent	John Comyns	2,596	0.1	+0.1
Peace on Earth	1. Dudley Leggett; 2. Michelle Sheather	2,502	0.1	+0.1
Engineered Australia	1. James Firbank; 2. Valerianne Hill; 3. William Lewis	2,434	0.1	+0.1
Progress	1. Marjorie Wisby; 2. Archibald Brown; 3. William More	1,905	0.1	+0.1
Socialist Workers	1. Amanda Orr; 2. Andres Garin	1,694	0.1	+0.1
Integrity Team	1. Kenneth Aylward; 2. Antony Maurice; 3. Geoffrey Holt	1,492	0.1	+0.1
Social Democrats	1. Walter Roach; 2. Edward de Bouter; 3. Johann Liszikam	1,089	0.0	0.0
Independent	Stephen Starkey	1,074	0.0	0.0
White Australia	1. Robert Cameron; 2. Russell Scrivener	1,025	0.0	0.0
The New Party	1. Vincent Murphy; 2. Stephen Tsousis	956	0.0	0.0
Republican	1. Peter Consandine; 2. David Maroney	582	0.0	0.0
New Australian	1. Rudolph Dezelin; 2. Milan Riznic	391	0.0	0.0
Australian Family Movement	1. Jon Axtens; 2. Joseph Fusco	326	0.0	0.0
Independent	Ross Baldwin	277	0.0	0.0
Independent	Glen Davis	188	0.0	0.0
Independent	Raymond Butcher	134	0.0	0.0
Independent	Kaine Aalto	87	0.0	0.0
Total formal votes		2,741,268	88.9	−1.7
Informal votes		341,787	11.1	+1.7
Turnout		3,083,055	94.9	+0.7

#	Senator	Party
1	Doug McClelland	Labor
2	John Carrick	Liberal
3	Arthur Gietzelt	Labor
4	Peter Baume	Liberal
5	Graham Richardson	Labor
6	Douglas Scott	National
7	Kerry Sibraa	Labor
8	Misha Lajovic	Liberal
9	Bruce Childs	Labor
10	Colin Mason	Democrat

== Victoria ==
1983 Australian federal election: Senate, Victoria
Party	Candidate	Votes	%	±%
Quota		194,358		
Labor	1. John Button (elected 1); 2. Gareth Evans (elected 4); 3. Cyril Primmer (elected 6); 4. Robert Ray (elected 8); 5. Olive Zakharov (elected 10); 6. Geoffrey Fary	994,471	46.5	+3.5
Coalition	1. Margaret Guilfoyle (Lib) (elected 2); 2. Austin Lewis (Lib) (elected 5); 3. Alan Missen (Lib) (elected 7); 4. David Hamer (Lib) (elected 9); 5. Shirley McKerrow (Nat); 6. Murray Buzza (Nat)	816,116	38.2	−2.6
Democrats	1. Don Chipp (elected 3); 2. John Siddons; 3. Janet Powell; 4. Ian Price	256,402	12.0	+0.7
Democratic Labour	1. Brian Handley; 2. Edna Hall; 3. John Easton; 4. James Jordan	47,206	2.2	+0.6
Independent	Jim Cairns	11,226	0.5	+0.5
Integrity Team	1. Robert J. Steer; 2. Louis Cook; 3. Robert B. Steer; 4. Beverley Meacher; 5. Miliano Mele	3,753	0.2	+0.2
Pensioner	1. Neil McKay; 2. Joseph Radcliffe; 3. George Cole	2,755	0.1	+0.1
Advance Victoria	1. Thomas Kelly; 2. Ellen Kelly; 3. Stephen Kelly; 4. Nicholas Kelly	1,346	0.1	+0.1
Socialist	1. Trevor McCandless; 2. Mark Treloar	1,142	0.1	+0.1
Socialist Workers	1. Maree Walk; 2. Andrew Jamieson	877	0.0	0.0
Proud to be Australian	1. Athol Kelly; 2. Graham Todd	625	0.0	0.0
Independent	Patrick Flanagan	493	0.0	0.0
Social Democrats	1. Joseph Johnson; 2. Brian Coe	366	0.0	0.0
Progress	1. Ian Mackechnie; 2. David Miller	290	0.0	0.0
Independent	Andrew Kaspariunas	229	0.0	0.0
Ethnic	Nikolaus Millios	205	0.0	0.0
Independent	Louis Constant	132	0.0	0.0
Independent	Earl Mignon	108	0.0	0.0
Independent	Umberto Mammarella	103	0.0	0.0
Independent	Leonard Stubbs	89	0.0	0.0
Total formal votes		2,137,934	89.3	−1.6
Informal votes		255,797	10.7	+1.6
Turnout		2,393,731	95.9	+0.9

#	Senator	Party
1	John Button	Labor
2	Margaret Guilfoyle	Liberal
3	Don Chipp	Democrat
4	Gareth Evans	Labor
5	Austin Lewis	Liberal
6	Cyril Primmer	Labor
7	Alan Missen	Liberal
8	Robert Ray	Labor
9	David Hamer	Liberal
10	Olive Zakharov	Labor

== Queensland ==
1983 Australian federal election: Senate, Queensland
Party	Candidate	Votes	%	±%
Quota		113,393		
Labor	1. George Georges (elected 1); 2. Mal Colston (elected 4); 3. Gerry Jones (elected 6); 4. Margaret Reynolds (elected 8); 5. Robert Gleeson; 6. Susan Yarrow	493,424	39.6	+1.1
National	1. Flo Bjelke-Petersen (elected 2); 2. Stan Collard (elected 5); 3. Ron Boswell (elected 7); 4. Patrick Behan	363,462	29.1	+2.3
Liberal	1. Kathy Martin (elected 3); 2. David MacGibbon (elected 10); 3. Edi Solari; 4. David Watson	187,495	15.0	−8.0
Democrats	1. Michael Macklin (elected 9); 2. Stanley Stanley; 3. Gilruth Rees; 4. Anthony Walters; 5. Allan Holz	98,997	7.9	−2.1
Group I	1. Neville Bonner; 2. Audrey Pengelis	83,502	6.7	+6.7
Progress	1. Vivian Forbes; 2. Jill Weil	10,787	0.9	+0.9
Christian Voice	1. John Herzog; 2. Tass Augustakis; 3. John Carlisle	3,113	0.2	+0.2
Integrity Team	1. Victor Bridger; 2. Michael Comerford; 3. Alan Ellis	1,963	0.1	+0.1
Independent	John Fitzgerald	1,517	0.1	+0.1
Party to Expose the Petrov Conspiracy	1. Cyril McKenzie; 2. Vynette McKenzie	775	0.0	0.0
Independent	Milan Lorman	599	0.0	0.0
Humanitarian	1. Derek Gillmore; 2. Marcus Platen	569	0.0	0.0
Socialist Workers	1. Jonathan West; 2. John Coleman	534	0.0	0.0
Independent	Francis Ross	161	0.0	0.0
Independent	Norman Eather	94	0.0	0.0
Independent	Ivan Harris	80	0.0	0.0
Independent	Estelle Cattoni	56	0.0	0.0
Total formal votes		1,247,321	91.4	+0.6
Informal votes		116,858	8.6	−0.6
Turnout		1,364,179	92.6	−1.4

#	Senator	Party
1	George Georges	Labor
2	Flo Bjelke-Petersen	National
3	Kathy Martin	Liberal
4	Mal Colston	Labor
5	Stan Collard	National
6	Gerry Jones	Labor
7	Ron Boswell	National
8	Margaret Reynolds	Labor
9	Michael Macklin	Democrat
10	David MacGibbon	Liberal

== Western Australia ==
1983 Australian federal election: Senate, Western Australia
Party	Candidate	Votes	%	±%
Quota		62,279		
Labor	1. Peter Walsh (elected 1); 2. Ruth Coleman (elected 3); 3. Gordon McIntosh (elected 5); 4. Patricia Giles (elected 7); 5. Peter Cook (elected 9); 6. Jim McKiernan	337,417	49.4	+10.6
Liberal	1. Fred Chaney (elected 2); 2. Peter Durack (elected 4); 3. Noel Crichton-Browne (elected 6); 4. Reg Withers (elected 8); 5. Andrew Thomas; 6. John Martyr	280,878	41.2	−4.7
Democrats	1. Jack Evans (elected 10); 2. Shirley de la Hunty; 3. Richard Jeffreys; 4. James Anderson	46,626	6.8	−2.5
National	1. Albert Llewellyn; 2. John Sattler; 3. Rodney Frost	7,689	1.1	−3.0
Socialist Workers	1. Anthony Forward; 2. Peter Holloway	5,452	0.8	+0.8
National	1. Murray Anderson; 2. Edna Adams; 3. Donald Bannister	3,894	0.6	−0.6
Group H	1. Robin Linke; 2. Charles Lee	1,779	0.2	+0.2
Group I	1. Francesco Nesci; 2. Nellie Stuart	725	0.1	+0.1
Social Democrats	1. Richard Savage; 2. Kerry Stevens	598	0.1	+0.1
Total formal votes		685,058	92.2	+2.1
Informal votes		58,257	7.8	−2.1
Turnout		743,315	93.0	−0.2

#	Senator	Party
1	Peter Walsh	Labor
2	Fred Chaney	Liberal
3	Ruth Coleman	Labor
4	Peter Durack	Liberal
5	Gordon McIntosh	Labor
6	Noel Crichton-Browne	Liberal
7	Patricia Giles	Labor
8	Reg Withers	Liberal
9	Peter Cook	Labor
10	Jack Evans	Democrat

== South Australia ==
1983 Australian federal election: Senate, South Australia
Party	Candidate	Votes	%	±%
Quota		69,396		
Labor	1. Ron Elstob (elected 1); 2. Dominic Foreman (elected 4); 3. Nick Bolkus (elected 6); 4. Graham Maguire (elected 8); 5. Rosemary Crowley (elected 10); 6. Brian Keneally	340,089	44.6	+3.8
Liberal	1. Tony Messner (elected 2); 2. Robert Hill (elected 5); 3. Don Jessop (elected 7); 4. Baden Teague (elected 9); 5. Harold Young; 6. Graham Ingerson	308,138	40.4	−2.9
Democrats	1. Janine Haines (elected 3); 2. Ted Radoslovich; 3. Margaret-Ann Williams; 4. David Vigor; 5. John Beech; 6. Patricia Shortridge	96,662	13.1	+1.9
National	1. Kevin Schulz; 2. William Nosworthy; 3. Stanley Draganoff	13,757	1.8	+0.8
Integrity Team	1. Betty Luks; 2. Barry Lindner; 3. Belle Harris; 4. John Wadey	4,026	0.5	+0.5
Communist	1. Anne McMenamin; 2. John Humphrys	1,058	0.1	+0.1
Libertarian	William Forster	959	0.1	+0.1
Socialist	1. Brian Rooney; 2. Laurence Kiek	864	0.1	+0.1
Socialist Workers	1. Douglas Lorimer; 2. Jennifer Fisher	795	0.1	+0.1
Independent	Colin George	777	0.1	+0.1
Social Democrats	1. Roger Ormsby; 2. John Parker	301	0.0	0.0
Total formal votes		763,349	91.2	−0.1
Informal votes		73,350	8.8	+0.1
Turnout		836,699	95.0	+0.1

#	Senator	Party
1	Ron Elstob	Labor
2	Tony Messner	Liberal
3	Janine Haines	Democrat
4	Dominic Foreman	Labor
5	Robert Hill	Liberal
6	Nick Bolkus	Labor
7	Don Jessop	Liberal
8	Graham Maguire	Labor
9	Baden Teague	Liberal
10	Rosemary Crowley	Labor

== Tasmania ==
1983 Australian federal election: Senate, Tasmania
Party	Candidate	Votes	%	±%
Quota		22,809		
Liberal	1. Peter Rae (elected 1); 2. Shirley Walters (elected 4); 3. Brian Archer (elected 6); 4. Michael Townley (elected 8); 5. John Watson (elected 10); 6. Gordon Ibbett	106,768	42.6	+3.2
Labor	1. Don Grimes (elected 2); 2. Michael Tate (elected 5); 3. Jean Hearn (elected 7); 4. John Coates (elected 9); 5. John White; 6. Vicki Buchanan	82,343	32.8	−2.8
Group D	1. Brian Harradine (elected 3); 2. John Jones	44,696	17.8	−4.0
Democrats	1. Norm Sanders; 2. Peter Creet; 3. Margaret Duthoit	17,089	6.8	+3.6
Total formal votes		250,896	92.6	+0.1
Informal votes		20,104	7.4	−0.1
Turnout		271,000	96.0	−0.3

#	Senator	Party
1	Peter Rae	Liberal
2	Don Grimes	Labor
3	Brian Harradine	Independent
4	Shirley Walters	Liberal
5	Michael Tate	Labor
6	Brian Archer	Liberal
7	Jean Hearn	Labor
8	Michael Townley	Liberal
9	John Coates	Labor
10	John Watson	Liberal

== Australian Capital Territory ==
1983 Australian federal election: Senate, Australian Capital Territory
Party	Candidate	Votes	%	±%
Quota		42,416		
Labor	1. Susan Ryan (elected 1); 2. Marc Robinson	70,433	55.4	+4.7
Liberal	1. Margaret Reid (elected 2); 2. John Munro	40,292	31.7	−5.4
Democrats	1. Charles Price; 2. Dimmen de Graaff	15,141	11.9	+3.3
Deadly Serious	Ian Rout	955	0.8	+0.8
Independent	Brian Scott	425	0.3	+0.3
Total formal votes		127,246	96.7	−0.5
Informal votes		4,287	3.3	+0.5
Turnout		131,533	95.7	+1.4

#	Senator	Party
1	Susan Ryan	Labor
2	Margaret Reid	Liberal

== Northern Territory ==
1983 Australian federal election: Senate, Northern Territory
Party	Candidate	Votes	%	±%
Quota		14,826		
Country Liberal	1. Bernie Kilgariff (elected 1); 2. Dallas Drake	21,406	48.1	+2.6
Labor	1. Ted Robertson (elected 2); 2. Denise Fincham	20,467	46.0	+7.1
Democrats	Fay Lawrence	2,359	5.3	−4.5
Independent	Harold Brown	245	0.6	+0.6
Total formal votes		44,477	95.3	+2.6
Informal votes		2,186	4.7	−2.6
Turnout		46,663	81.4	−0.9

#	Senator	Party
1	Bernie Kilgariff	Country Liberal
2	Ted Robertson	Labor

== See also ==
- 1983 Australian federal election
- Candidates of the Australian federal election, 1983
- Members of the Australian Senate, 1983–1985
