= 1980 Australian Senate election =

Australian federal election results

1980 Australian Senate elections
- 18 October 1980

34 of the 64 seats in the Australian Senate 33 seats needed for a majority
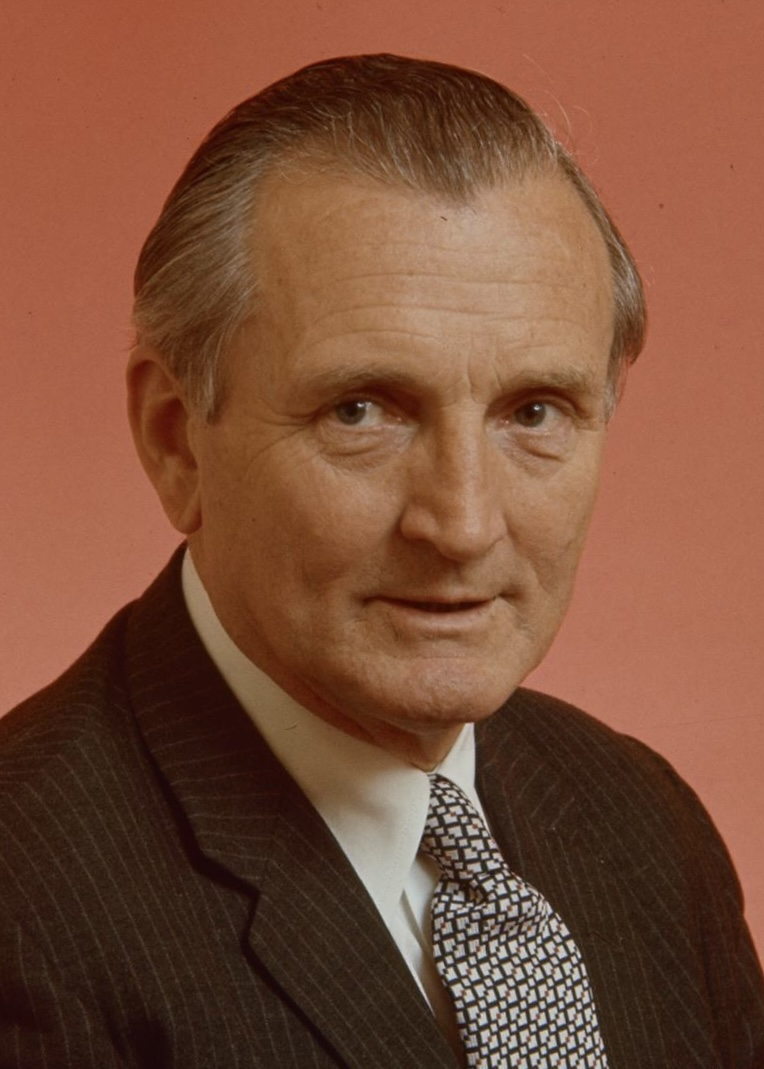

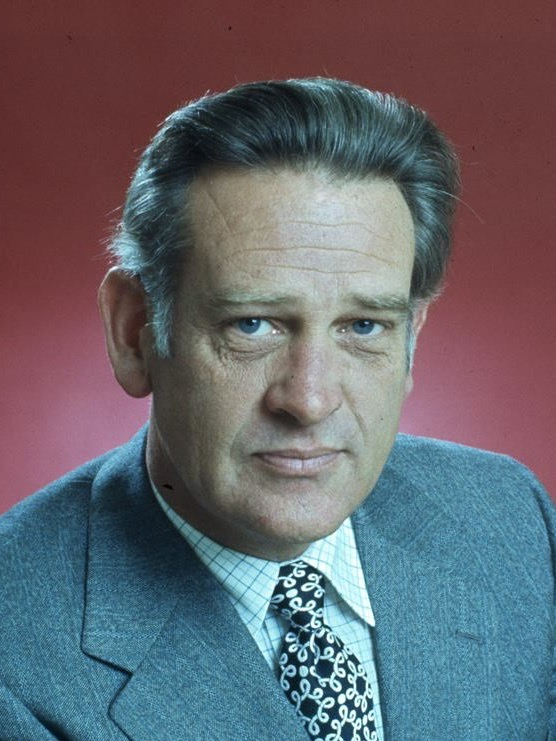

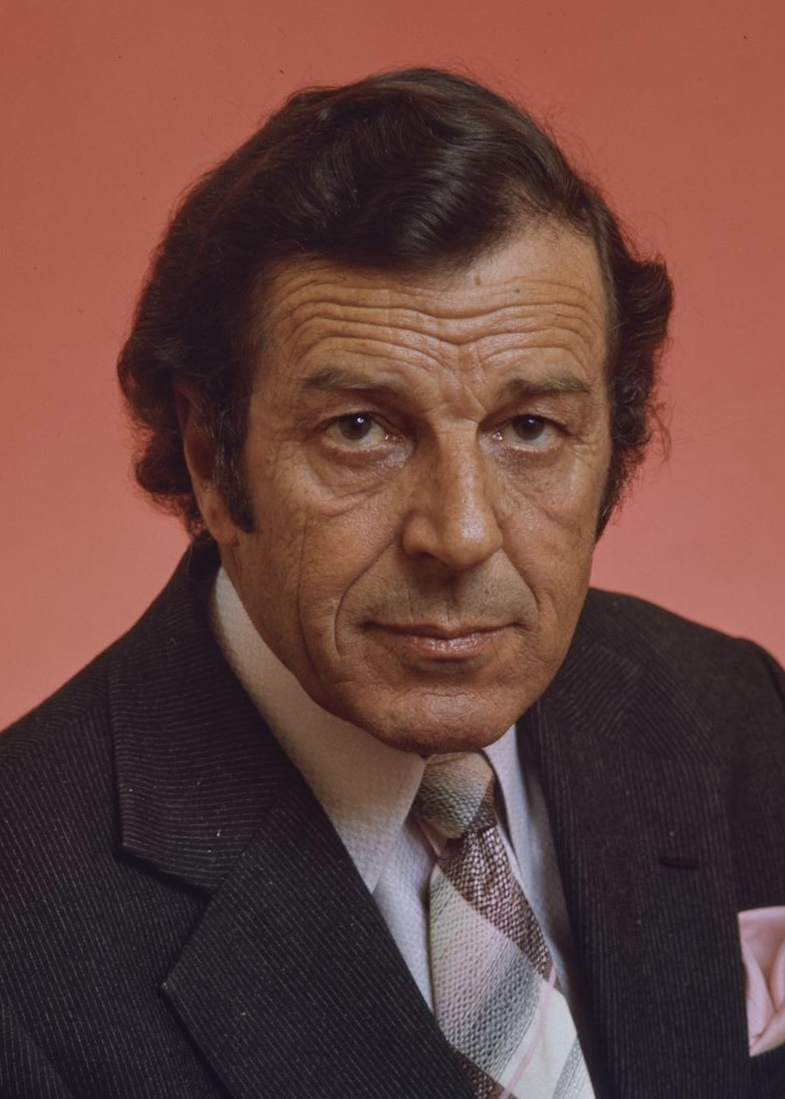
| | First party | Second party | Third party |
|---|---|---|---|
| Leader | John Carrick | Ken Wriedt | Don Chipp |
| Party | Liberal/National coalition | Labor | Democrats |
| Leader since | 7 August 1978 | 10 February 1975 | 9 May 1977 |
| Leader's seat | New South Wales | Tasmania | Victoria |
| Seats before | 34 | 27 | 2 |
| Seats after | 31 | 27 | 5 |
| Seat change | ▼3 | 0 | ▲3 |
| Popular vote | 3,352,521 | 3,250,187 | 711,805 |
| Percentage | 43.58% | 42.25% | 9.25% |
| Swing | ▼1.98% | ▲5.49% | ▼1.88% |
- Senators elected in the 1980 federal election
Leader of the Senate before election
John Carrick
Liberal/National coalition
Elected Leader of the Senate
John Carrick
Liberal/National coalition

The following tables show state-by-state results in the Australian Senate at the 1980 federal election. Senators total 31 coalition (27 Liberal, one coalition National, one CLP), 27 Labor, two non-coalition National, five Democrats, and one Independent. Senator terms are six years (three for territories). Senators elected at this election began their terms on 1 July 1981, except for the territorial senators who took their seats at the election.

== Australia ==
Senate (STV) — 1980–83—Turnout 94.35% (CV) — Informal 9.65%
| Party | Votes | % | Swing | Seats won | Total seats | Change |
|---|---|---|---|---|---|---|
| Liberal–NCP coalition | 3,352,521 | 43.58 | –1.98 | 15 | 31 | –3 |
| Liberal–NCP joint ticket | 1,971,528 | 25.63 | −8.63 | 4 | * | * |
| Liberal | 1,011,289 | 13.15 | +2.55 | 9 | 27 | 0 |
| National Country | 341,978 | 4.45 | +3.95 | 1 | 3 | –3 |
| Country Liberal | 19,129 | 0.25 | +0.04 | 1 | 1 | 0 |
| Labor | 3,250,187 | 42.25 | +5.49 | 15 | 27 | 0 |
| Democrats | 711,805 | 9.25 | −1.88 | 3 | 5 | +3 |
| Call to Australia | 118,535 | 1.54 | +0.42 | 0 | 0 | 0 |
| Democratic Labor | 31,766 | 0.41 | –1.26 | 0 | 0 | 0 |
| Marijuana | 28,337 | 0.37 | –0.23 | 0 | 0 | 0 |
| Australia | 27,404 | 0.36 | +0.25 | 0 | 0 | 0 |
| Socialist | 15,412 | 0.20 | –0.38 | 0 | 0 | 0 |
| Progress | 8,252 | 0.11 | –1.08 | 0 | 0 | 0 |
| NPWA | 7,597 | 0.10 | +0.10 | 0 | 0 | 0 |
| Progressive Conservative | 6,247 | 0.07 | +0.07 | 0 | 0 | |
| National Front of Australia | 1,467 | 0.01 | +0.01 | 0 | 0 | |
| Other | 56,128 | 0.73 | +0.73 | 0 | 0 | 0 |
| Independent | 86,770 | 1.13 | –0.60 | 1 | 1 | 0 |
| Total | 7,692,364 | | | 34 | 64 | |

== New South Wales ==
| Elected | # | Senator | Party |
|---|---|---|---|
1981
| 1981 | 1 | Doug McClelland | Labor |
| 1981 | 2 | John Carrick | Liberal |
| 1981 | 3 | Bruce Childs | Labor |
| 1981 | 4 | Douglas Scott | NCP |
| 1981 | 5 | Kerry Sibraa | Labor |
1978
| 1978 | 1 | Peter Baume | Liberal |
| 1978 | 2 | Tony Mulvihill | Labor |
| 1978 | 3 | Misha Lajovic | Liberal |
| 1978 | 4 | Arthur Gietzelt | Labor |
| 1978 | 5 | Colin Mason | Democrat |

1980 Australian federal election: Senate, New South Wales
| Party | Candidate | Votes | % | ±% |
|---|---|---|---|---|
| Quota | | 452,977 | | |
| Labor | 1. Doug McClelland (elected 1); 2. Bruce Childs (elected 3); 3. Kerry Sibraa (elected 5) | 1,215,796 | 44.7 | +4.6 |
| Coalition | 1. John Carrick (Lib) (elected 2); 2. Douglas Scott (NCP) (elected 4); 3. Chris Puplick (Lib) | 1,139,825 | 41.9 | −1.4 |
| Democrats | 1. Paul McLean; 2. Elisabeth Kirkby; 3. Laurence Bourke | 187,507 | 6.9 | −1.4 |
| Call to Australia | 1. Fred Nile; 2. John Whitehall; 3. Joan Loew | 118,535 | 4.4 | +2.5 |
| Marijuana | 1. James Billington; 2. Anne Parsons | 13,476 | 0.5 | −0.4 |
| National Colonialist Party | 1. Nicholas Jones; 2. Ian MacRae | 11,038 | 0.4 | +0.4 |
| Socialist | 1. Peter Symon; 2. Harry Black; 3. Raymond Ferguson; 4. Edgar Woodbury | 8,760 | 0.3 | +0.1 |
| Group C | 1. John E Champion; 2. Julie A Champion; 3. John D Champion | 6,785 | 0.3 | +0.3 |
| Independent | Estelle Myers | 4,469 | 0.2 | +0.2 |
| Independent | Joylene Hairmouth | 4,334 | 0.2 | +0.2 |
| Independent | Josephine Chisholm-Mallett | 2,855 | 0.1 | +0.1 |
| Progress | 1. Fernand Eyschen; 2. Nicholas Hudson | 2,260 | 0.1 | −2.4 |
| Independent | Terence Griffiths | 921 | 0.0 | 0.0 |
| Independent | Berard O'Grady | 489 | 0.0 | 0.0 |
| Independent | Rudolph Dezelin | 305 | 0.0 | 0.0 |
| Independent | Norman Eather | 262 | 0.0 | 0.0 |
| Independent | Gene Salvestrin | 241 | 0.0 | 0.0 |
| Total formal votes | | 2,717,858 | 90.6 | +0.2 |
| Informal votes | | 281,338 | 9.4 | −0.2 |
| Turnout | | 2,999,186 | 94.2 | −0.8 |

== Victoria ==
| Elected | # | Senator | Party |
|---|---|---|---|
1981
| 1981 | 1 | Cyril Primmer | Labor |
| 1981 | 2 | Margaret Guilfoyle | Liberal |
| 1981 | 3 | Robert Ray | Labor |
| 1981 | 4 | Austin Lewis | Liberal |
| 1981 | 5 | John Siddons | Democrat |
1978
| 1978 | 1 | Alan Missen | Liberal |
| 1978 | 2 | Gareth Evans | Labor |
| 1978 | 3 | David Hamer | Liberal |
| 1978 | 4 | John Button | Labor |
| 1978 | 5 | Don Chipp | Democrat |

1980 Australian federal election: Senate, Victoria
| Party | Candidate | Votes | % | ±% |
|---|---|---|---|---|
| Quota | | 339,953 | | |
| Labor | 1. Cyril Primmer (elected 1); 2. Robert Ray (elected 3); 3. Jean Melzer | 877,468 | 43.0 | +8.8 |
| Coalition | 1. Margaret Guilfoyle (Lib) (elected 2); 2. Austin Lewis (Lib) (elected 4); 3. Laurence Neal (NCP) | 831,703 | 40.8 | −1.0 |
| Democrats | 1. John Siddons (elected 5); 2. Janet Powell; 3. Ian Price | 231,113 | 11.3 | −4.9 |
| Democratic Labour | 1. Paul McManus; 2. John Flint; 3. Robert Semmel | 31,766 | 1.6 | −4.6 |
| Australia | 1. Gail Farrell; 2. Frederick Funnell | 25,734 | 1.3 | +1.2 |
| Marijuana | 1. Margaret Fraser; 2. James Billington | 11,684 | 0.6 | −0.1 |
| Group B | 1. John Jess; 2. John Davies; 3. Donald Moyes | 10,402 | 0.5 | +0.5 |
| Group K | 1. Francis Petering; 2. Jean McPherson; 3. Louis Cook | 9,081 | 0.4 | +0.4 |
| Socialist | 1. Georgina Lialios; 2. Trevor McCandless; 3. Raymond Berbling | 2,791 | 0.1 | −0.1 |
| Group E | 1. Shane Watson; 2. Ernest Langmaid | 1,765 | 0.1 | +0.1 |
| Group D | 1. George Samargis; 2. Daniel Smargis | 1,538 | 0.1 | +0.1 |
| Independent | Pamela Moore | 1,498 | 0.1 | +0.1 |
| Independent | Anthony Palmer | 1,470 | 0.1 | +0.1 |
| Independent | Augustus Titter | 1,157 | 0.1 | +0.1 |
| Independent | Maurice Smith | 329 | 0.0 | 0.0 |
| Independent | Wilhelm Kapphan | 217 | 0.0 | 0.0 |
| Total formal votes | | 2,039,716 | 90.9 | 0.0 |
| Informal votes | | 256,060 | 9.1 | 0.0 |
| Turnout | | 2,295,776 | 95.0 | −0.7 |

== Queensland ==
| Elected | # | Senator | Party |
|---|---|---|---|
1981
| 1981 | 1 | Jim Keeffe | Labor |
| 1981 | 2 | Flo Bjelke-Petersen | NCP |
| 1981 | 3 | Neville Bonner | Liberal |
| 1981 | 4 | Gerry Jones | Labor |
| 1981 | 5 | Michael Macklin | Democrat |
1978
| 1978 | 1 | Kathy Sullivan | Liberal |
| 1978 | 2 | George Georges | Labor |
| 1978 | 3 | Stan Collard | NCP |
| 1978 | 4 | Mal Colston | Labor |
| 1978 | 5 | David MacGibbon | Liberal |

1980 Australian federal election: Senate: Queensland
| Party | Candidate | Votes | % | ±% |
|---|---|---|---|---|
| Quota | | 192,889 | | |
| Labor | 1. Jim Keeffe (elected 1); 2. Gerry Jones (elected 4); 3. Robert Gleeson | 445,277 | 38.5 | +3.9 |
| National Country | 1. Flo Bjelke-Petersen (elected 2); 2. Glen Sheil; 3. Ron Maunsell | 309,622 | 26.8 | +26.8* |
| Liberal | 1. Neville Bonner (elected 3); 2. Yvonne McComb; 3. Franz Born | 266,407 | 23.0 | +23.0* |
| Democrats | 1. Michael Macklin (elected 5); 2. William Elson-Green; 3. Gilruth Rees | 115,429 | 10.0 | +1.0 |
| Progress | 1. Vivian Forbes; 2. Frank Paull | 3,399 | 0.3 | −0.5 |
| Group J | 1. Lionel Fifield; 2. Robert McClintock | 3,256 | 0.3 | +0.3 |
| Group F | 1. John Butler; 2. Anne Glew | 3,022 | 0.3 | +0.3 |
| Socialist | 1. David Ryan; 2. Stephen Bulloch; 3. Ivan Ivanoff | 2,514 | 0.2 | −2.6 |
| Independent | Norman Eather | 2,191 | 0.2 | +0.2 |
| Group G | 1. Sydney Shawcross; 2. Cyril McKenzie; 3. Michael Dendle | 2,102 | 0.2 | +0.2 |
| National Front | 1. Rosemary Sisson; 2. Victor Robb | 1,467 | 0.1 | +0.1 |
| Independent | Carlemo Wacando | 1,326 | 0.1 | +0.1 |
| Group H | 1. James Drabsch; 2. Vivien Botterill | 513 | 0.0 | 0.0 |
| Independent | Neil McKay | 369 | 0.0 | 0.0 |
| Independent | Anthony Catip | 241 | 0.0 | 0.0 |
| Independent | Frederick Phillips | 195 | 0.0 | 0.0 |
| Total formal votes | | 1,157,330 | 90.8 | −1.2 |
| Informal votes | | 117,884 | 9.2 | +1.2 |
| Turnout | | 1,275,214 | 94.0 | −0.8 |

- The Liberal and Country parties contested the previous election as a Coalition, where they obtained 51.3% of the vote. In this election, they contested the election as separate parties.

== South Australia ==
| Elected | # | Senator | Party |
|---|---|---|---|
1981
| 1981 | 1 | Don Jessop | Liberal |
| 1981 | 2 | Dominic Foreman | Labor |
| 1981 | 3 | Robert Hill | Liberal |
| 1981 | 4 | Nick Bolkus | Labor |
| 1981 | 5 | Janine Haines | Democrat |
1978
| 1978 | 1 | Tony Messner | Liberal |
| 1978 | 2 | Geoff McLaren | Labor |
| 1978 | 3 | Harold Young | Liberal |
| 1978 | 4 | Ron Elstob | Labor |
| 1978 | 5 | Baden Teague | Liberal |

1980 Australian federal election, Senate, South Australia
| Party | Candidate | Votes | % | ±% |
|---|---|---|---|---|
| Quota | | 122,723 | | |
| Liberal | 1. Don Jessop (elected 1); 2. Robert Hill (elected 3); 3. Craig Spiel | 319,088 | 43.3 | −5.8 |
| Labor | 1. Dominic Foreman (elected 2); 2. Nick Bolkus (elected 4); 3. Graham Maguire | 300,420 | 40.8 | +4.0 |
| Democrats | 1. Janine Haines (elected 5); 2. Ian Gilfillan; 3. David Vigor | 96,662 | 13.1 | +1.9 |
| National Country | 1. Geoffrey Clothier; 2. Sylvia Schulz; 3. Peter McBride | 7,419 | 1.0 | +1.0 |
| Concerned Christian Candidates | 1. Betty Luks; 2. James Cronin; 3. Gordon Kroschel | 4,189 | 0.6 | +0.6 |
| Marijuana | 1. Craig Cocks; 2. Gwenda Woods | 2,373 | 0.3 | +0.3 |
| Australia | 1. Ian Modistach; 2. Alan Jamieson | 1,670 | 0.2 | −0.2 |
| Socialist | 1. Brian Rooney; 2. Ida Goss; 3. Laurence Kiek | 1,347 | 0.2 | −0.1 |
| Progressive Conservative | 1. David Kitto; 2. Mary McKenzie-Huish | 1,248 | 0.2 | +0.2 |
| Independent | Valentine Furner | 879 | 0.1 | +0.1 |
| Independent | William Forster | 820 | 0.1 | +0.1 |
| Independent | Raymond Bradtke | 221 | 0.0 | 0.0 |
| Total formal votes | | 736,336 | 91.3 | +1.7 |
| Informal votes | | 70,359 | 8.7 | −1.7 |
| Turnout | | 806,695 | 94.9 | −0.2 |

== Western Australia ==
| Elected | # | Senator | Party |
|---|---|---|---|
1981
| 1981 | 1 | Reg Withers | Liberal |
| 1981 | 2 | Gordon McIntosh | Labor |
| 1981 | 3 | Peter Durack | Liberal |
| 1981 | 4 | Patricia Giles | Labor |
| 1981 | 5 | Noel Crichton-Browne | Liberal |
1978
| 1978 | 1 | Fred Chaney | Liberal |
| 1978 | 2 | Peter Walsh | Labor |
| 1978 | 3 | Andrew Thomas | Liberal |
| 1978 | 4 | Ruth Coleman | Labor |
| 1978 | 5 | Allan Rocher | Liberal |

1980 Australian federal election: Senate, Western Australia
| Party | Candidate | Votes | % | ±% |
|---|---|---|---|---|
| Quota | | 105,085 | | |
| Liberal | 1. Reg Withers (elected 1); 2. Peter Durack (elected 3); 3. Noel Crichton-Browne (elected 5) | 283,429 | 45.0 | −1.4 |
| Labor | 1. Gordon McIntosh (elected 2); 2. Patricia Giles (elected 4); 3. Brian Conway | 244,729 | 38.8 | +6.0 |
| Democrats | 1. Jack Evans; 2. Geoffrey Taylor; 3. Shirley de la Hunty | 58,538 | 9.3 | −3.2 |
| National Country | 1. John Patterson; 2. John McIntyre; 3. Leonard Newing | 25,937 | 4.1 | −2.0 |
| National | 1. Anthony Overheu; 2. Edna Adams; 3. Murray Anderson | 7,597 | 1.2 | +1.2 |
| Progressive Conservative | 1. Syd Negus; 2. Peter Harwood | 4,999 | 0.8 | +0.8 |
| Progress | 1. John Trewick; 2. James Jamieson; 3. Kenneth Law | 2,593 | 0.4 | −1.3 |
| Group D | 1. Francesco Nesci; 2. Nellie Stuart | 1,570 | 0.2 | +0.2 |
| Independent | Douglas Thorp | 1,112 | 0.2 | +0.2 |
| Total formal votes | | 630,504 | 90.1 | −1.7 |
| Informal votes | | 69,453 | 9.9 | +1.7 |
| Turnout | | 699,957 | 93.2 | −0.8 |

== Tasmania ==
| Elected | # | Senator | Party |
|---|---|---|---|
1981
| 1981 | 1 | Peter Rae | Liberal |
| 1981 | 2 | Jean Hearn | Labor |
| 1981 | 3 | Brian Harradine | Independent |
| 1981 | 4 | Michael Townley | Liberal |
| 1981 | 5 | John Coates | Labor |
1978
| 1978 | 1 | Shirley Walters | Liberal |
| 1978 | 2 | Don Grimes | Labor |
| 1978 | 3 | Brian Archer | Liberal |
| 1978 | 4 | Michael Tate | Labor |
| 1978 | 5 | John Watson | Liberal |

1980 Australian federal election: Senate, Tasmania
| Party | Candidate | Votes | % | ±% |
|---|---|---|---|---|
| Quota | | 40,640 | | |
| Liberal | 1. Peter Rae (elected 1); 2. Michael Townley (elected 4); 3. Peter Jones | 96,098 | 39.4 | −10.4 |
| Labor | 1. Jean Hearn (elected 2); 2. John Coates (elected 5); 3. John White | 86,833 | 35.6 | −2.1 |
| Group B | 1. Brian Harradine (elected 3); 2. Harry Upston | 52,247 | 21.4 | +21.4 |
| Democrats | 1. Norman Siberry; 2. Rae Saxon; 3. Brian Austen | 7,780 | 3.2 | −2.7 |
| Total formal votes | | 243,838 | 92.5 | −0.4 |
| Informal votes | | 19,651 | 7.5 | +0.4 |
| Turnout | | 263,489 | 96.3 | −0.4 |

== Australian Capital Territory ==
| Elected | # | Senator | Party |
|---|---|---|---|
1980
| 1980 | 1 | Susan Ryan | Labor |
| 1980 | 2 | John Knight | Liberal |

1980 Australian federal election: Senate, Australian Capital Territory
| Party | Candidate | Votes | % | ±% |
|---|---|---|---|---|
| Quota | | 41,569 | | |
| Labor | 1. Susan Ryan (elected 1); 2. John Langmore | 63,280 | 50.8 | +7.6 |
| Liberal | 2. John Knight (elected 2); 2. David Adams | 46,267 | 37.1 | −1.3 |
| Democrats | 1. John Filler; 2. John Morgan | 10,663 | 8.5 | −4.3 |
| Jobless Action Community Campaign | 1. Neville Curtis; 2. Jacqueline Flitcroft | 4,001 | 3.2 | +3.2 |
| Independent | Joseph Marks | 493 | 0.4 | +0.4 |
| Total formal votes | | 124,704 | 97.2 | +6.9 |
| Informal votes | | 3,558 | 2.8 | −6.9 |
| Turnout | | 128,262 | 94.3 | −1.3 |

== Northern Territory ==
| Elected | # | Senator | Party |
|---|---|---|---|
1980
| 1980 | 1 | Bernie Kilgariff | Country Liberal |
| 1980 | 2 | Ted Robertson | Labor |

1980 Australian federal election: Senate, Northern Territory
| Party | Candidate | Votes | % | ±% |
|---|---|---|---|---|
| Quota | | 14,027 | | |
| Country Liberal | 1. Bernard Kilgariff (elected 1); 2. Graeme Lewis | 19,129 | 45.5 | −0.5 |
| Labor | 1. Ted Robertson (elected 2); 2. Hunter Harrison | 16,384 | 38.9 | −1.5 |
| Democrats | 1. Jack Hunt; 2. William Evans | 4,113 | 9.8 | +1.6 |
| Christian Democrat | 1. Ronald Mann; 2. Charles Coombs | 1,648 | 3.9 | +3.9 |
| Marijuana | 1. Jennifer Smether; 2. Lance Lawrence | 804 | 1.9 | +1.9 |
| Total formal votes | | 42,078 | 92.7 | −0.8 |
| Informal votes | | 3,325 | 7.3 | +0.8 |
| Turnout | | 45,403 | 82.3 | +1.1 |

== See also ==
- 1980 Australian federal election
- Candidates of the Australian federal election, 1980
- Members of the Australian Senate, 1981–1983
