= Linda Kirk =

Australian politician

Senator for South Australia
- In office 1 July 2002 – 30 June 2008
- Preceded by: Chris Schacht
- Succeeded by: Don Farrell

Personal details
- Born: 24 May 1967 (age 59) Adelaide, South Australia
- Party: Australian Labor Party
- Education: University of Adelaide
- Profession: solicitor

Linda Jean Kirk (born 24 May 1967) is an Australian politician. She was a Labor member of the Australian Senate from 2002 to 2008, representing the state of South Australia.

== Early life and career ==
Kirk was born in Adelaide. She joined the Australian Labor Party in 1988 while studying as an undergraduate at the University of Adelaide. In 1990 she graduated with a First Class Honours degree in law and a degree in economics. She was awarded four scholarships to undertake a Master of Laws degree at the University of Cambridge which she completed in 1993.

== Career ==
Before taking her seat in the Senate, Kirk worked as a solicitor at an Adelaide commercial law firm, as a lecturer in Constitutional and Administrative Law at the University of Adelaide, and as an Industrial Officer at the Shop Distributive and Allied Employees' Association (SDA) in South Australia. She was an Australian Republican Movement delegate to the Australian Constitutional Convention in 1998, and served a term as a Councillor of the Adelaide City Council.

Kirk was Deputy Opposition Whip in the Senate, the Deputy Chair of the Foreign Affairs sub-committee of the Joint Standing Committee on Foreign Affairs, Defence and Trade (JSCFADT), a member of the Human Rights sub-committee of JSCFADT and a long-standing member of the Senate Legal and Constitutional Committee. She has been the Deputy Chair of the Joint Migration Committee and a member of the Joint Standing Committee on Treaties.

Her policy interests focus on legal and constitutional issues, foreign affairs and international relations, refugees and migration, human rights, and the protection of women and children. She was the Convenor of Parliamentarians Against Child Abuse and a former Deputy Chair of the Status of Women Committee of the Federal Caucus.

Kirk maintains a strong interest in constitutional law and scholarship, and is currently completing a Doctor of Philosophy degree in law at the Australian National University.

Kirk served only one term in the Senate after being defeated for Labor Party preselection by Don Farrell ahead of the 2007 federal election. Kirk ascribed her loss to her support for stem cell research and her support for Kevin Rudd in the 2006 leadership contest, both of which were against the wishes of her faction. It marked a role reversal from six years earlier, when she defeated incumbent Senator Chris Schacht for preselection.

On 15 December 2016, Kirk was appointed as a part-time senior member of the Administrative Appeals Tribunal for seven years.
