= Alex Gallacher =

Australian politician (1954–2021)

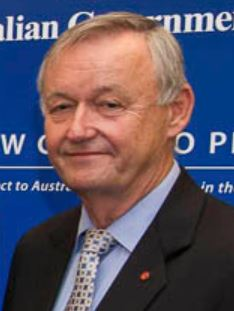
- Gallacher in 2014

Senator for South Australia
- In office 1 July 2011 – 29 August 2021
- Succeeded by: Karen Grogan

Personal details
- Born: Alexander McEachian Gallacher; 1 January 1954 New Cumnock, Scotland, United Kingdom
- Died: 29 August 2021 (aged 67) Australia
- Citizenship: Australian (1980–2021); British (1954–2010)
- Party: Labor
- Occupation: Trade union official

Alexander McEachian Gallacher (1 January 1954 – 29 August 2021) was an Australian politician who was a Senator for South Australia from 2011 until his death in 2021. He was a member of the Australian Labor Party (ALP) and was a senior official in the Transport Workers Union of Australia (TWU) before entering parliament.

== Early life ==
Gallacher was born on 1 January 1954 in New Cumnock, Scotland. He arrived in Australia with his family in 1966 and became an Australian citizen in 1980. He renounced his British citizenship prior to his election to parliament in 2010, as required by section 44 of the constitution. After leaving school, he worked as a labourer and truck driver for a number of years. He was then employed as a ramp services operator with Trans Australia Airlines (TAA) from 1976 to 1988.

== Labour movement ==
Before entering parliament, Gallacher had a long involvement with the Transport Workers Union of Australia (TWU). Within the union's South Australia/Northern Territory (SA/NT) branch, he held the positions of industrial officer (1988–1992), organiser (1992–1996), and state secretary (1996–2010). He additionally served as federal vice-president (2005–2007) and president (2007–2010).

== Politics ==
Gallacher joined the Australian Labor Party (ALP) in 1988 and served as a delegate to state council and the ALP National Conference. He aligned with the Labor Right faction. Prior to the 2010 federal election, he won ALP preselection for the Senate in first position on the party's ticket in South Australia. He defeated two incumbent senators, Anne McEwen and Dana Wortley, for the place at the top of the ticket.

Gallacher was elected in 2010 to an initial term beginning on 1 July 2011. He was re-elected at the 2016 and 2019 federal elections. In his maiden speech, Gallacher listed transport, road safety and superannuation as three priority interests. He also stated his concerns over the impact of the carbon tax on road transport and call for self-employed drivers to be compensated for any negative impacts. He later warned against the ALP becoming "captive to a new Green agenda".

Gallacher served on a number of standing and select committees during his time in the Senate.

== Personal life ==
Gallacher was diagnosed with lung cancer in January 2020 and took a leave of absence from the Senate to undergo treatment. He self-isolated during the COVID-19 pandemic. He died on 29 August 2021, aged 67.
