= Karen Grogan =

Australian politician and trade unionist (born 1967)

Senator Karen Grogan
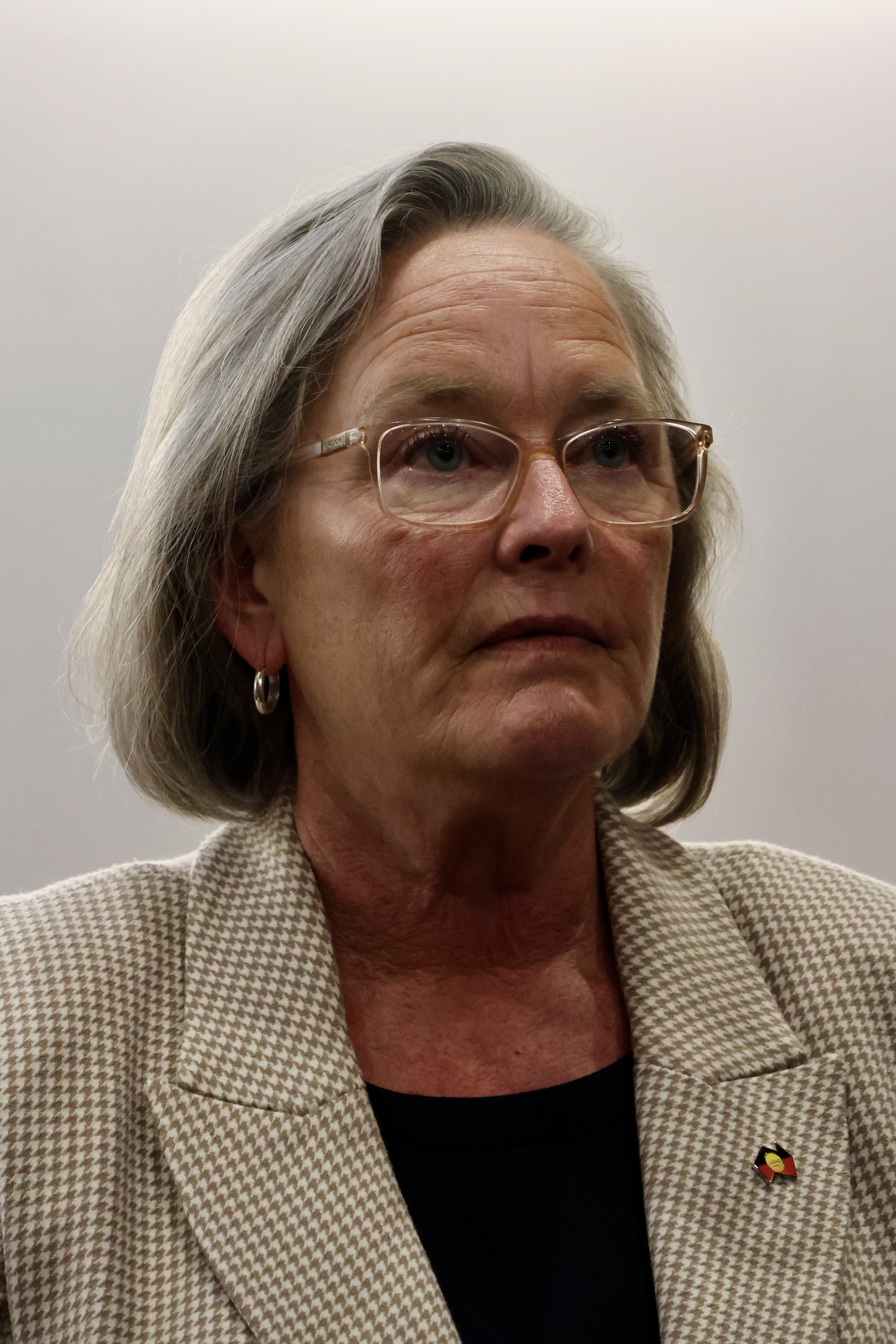
- Grogan in 2025

Senator for South Australia
- Incumbent
- Assumed office 21 September 2021
- Preceded by: Alex Gallacher

Personal details
- Born: 25 June 1967 (age 59) London, England
- Party: Labor
- Education: London College of Printing; Southern Cross University (MBus)
- Occupation: Trade unionist; politician
- Karen Grogan's voice Grogan speaking about her party's energy policy Recorded 29 April 2025

Karen Grogan (born 25 June 1967) is an Australian politician and trade unionist who has served as a Senator for South Australia since September 2021. Throughout her career, she has worked across various sectors, including education, mental health, the environment, social and community services, and Aboriginal issues.

== Early life and education ==
Karen Grogan was born on 25 June 1967 in London, England, into a large Irish Catholic family in south-west London. She grew up on a housing estate near the World's End, shaped by the values of her parents—her father, Larry, a shop steward with the Transport and General Workers' Union, introduced her to the Labour movement and the power of collective action, while her mother, Kathleen, instilled in her a strong sense of community and unwavering personal support. These early influences laid the foundation for her lifelong commitment to social and economic justice.

In 1990, Grogan moved to Australia, travelling across the country and working in a range of jobs. Four years later, now an Australian citizen, her life took a dramatic turn when her unborn child became seriously ill, her partner left, and she lost her job. With no family nearby, she relied on the support of friends, Medicare, and the social welfare system. This period of hardship deepened her resolve to fight for a fairer society. Grogan later earned a Diploma in Media Communications from the London College of Printing and a Master of Business (MBus) from Southern Cross University.

== Career ==
Grogan served as the chief executive officer of the South Australian Council of Social Service from September 2004 to October 2009. She then worked as chief of staff to Mark Butler from September 2010 to October 2016. In 2017, Grogan became a member of the Australian Labor Party (ALP) Executive in South Australia and served as the junior vice-president of the ALP in South Australia until 2018. She went on to hold the role of deputy chief of staff to Premier Jay Weatherill from March 2017 to March 2018, and later became deputy chief of staff to Opposition Leader Peter Malinauskas from March to September 2018. Following this, Grogan worked as the executive director of the Wentworth Group of Concerned Scientists from November 2018 to August 2019.

Grogan, who succeeded David Gray as leader of the Progressive Left Unions and Sub-branches faction in 2019, announced her intention to seek the party's endorsement to fill the casual vacancy, which was to be filled in September. She served as the national political coordinator for the United Workers Union from August 2019 to September 2021 and became a member of the ALP National Executive in 2021. On 21 September 2021, Grogan was appointed by the Parliament of South Australia under section 15 of the Constitution to represent the state in the Senate, following the death of Alex Gallacher. She later became the Government Deputy Whip in the Senate on 18 March 2024.

Grogan was elected in her own right in the 2025 Federal Election.

== Personal life ==
Grogan is not married, but she has a son named Brendan.

== Awards ==
- Augusta Zadow Award (2005)
