= Gordon McIntosh =

Scottish-born Australian politician (1925–2019)

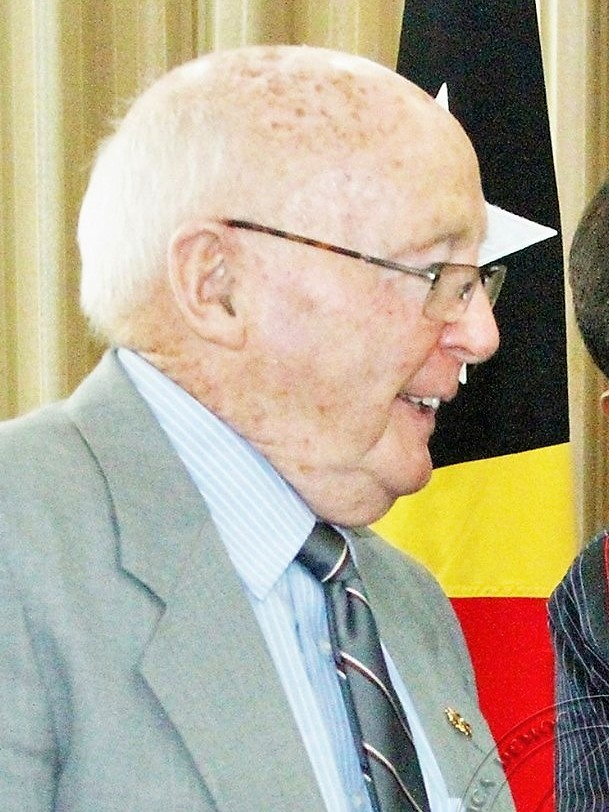

Senator for Western Australia
- In office 18 May 1974 – 5 June 1987

Personal details
- Born: Gordon Douglas McIntosh; 29 May 1925 Glasgow, Scotland
- Died: 10 March 2019 (aged 93) Perth, Western Australia
- Party: Australian Labor Party
- Occupation: Metal worker

Military service
- Allegiance: United Kingdom
- Branch/service: Royal Air Force
- Years of service: 1946–1948

Gordon Douglas McIntosh (29 May 1925 – 10 March 2019) was a Scottish-born Australian politician.

== Early life ==
Born in Glasgow, he was a toolmaker and served in the Royal Air Force from 1946 to 1948. Having moved to Australia, he was president of the Western Australian branch of the Amalgamated Engineering Union, and later, following its amalgamation, vice-president of the Western Australian branch of the Amalgamated Metal Workers Union. In 1974, he was elected to the Australian Senate as a Labor Senator for Western Australia. He held the seat until his retirement in 1987.
