= Chris Schacht =

Australian politician

The Honourable Chris Schacht
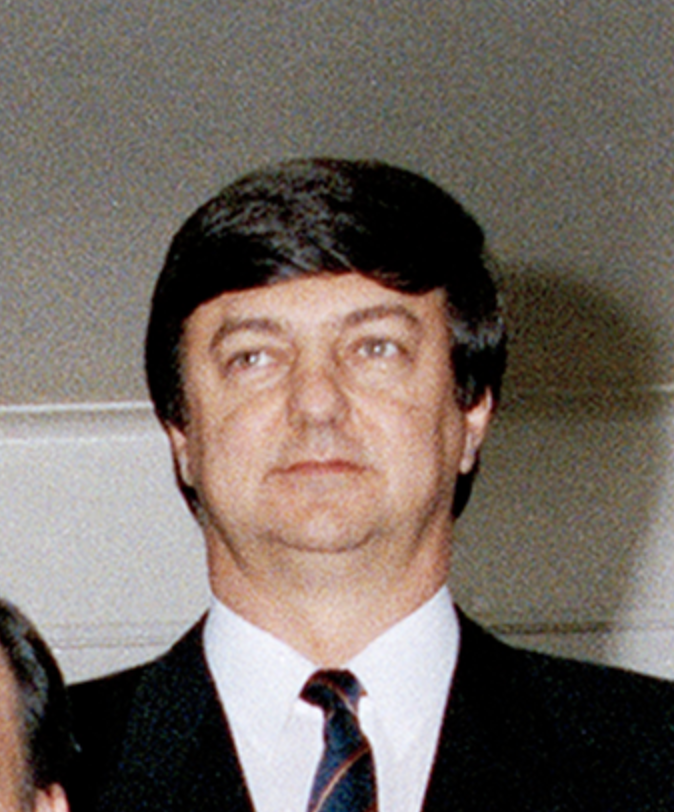

Minister for Small Business, Customs and Construction
- In office 24 March 1993 – 11 March 1996
- Prime Minister: Paul Keating
- Preceded by: David Beddall
- Succeeded by: Geoff Prosser

Minister for Science and Small Business
- In office 24 March 1993 – 25 March 1994
- Prime Minister: Paul Keating
- Preceded by: Ross Free
- Succeeded by: Peter Cook

Senator for South Australia
- In office 11 July 1987 – 30 June 2002
- Preceded by: Ron Elstob
- Succeeded by: Penny Wong

Personal details
- Born: Christopher Cleland Schacht; 6 December 1946 (age 79) Melbourne, Victoria, Australia
- Party: Labor

Christopher Cleland Schacht (born 6 December 1946) is a former Australian politician and member of the South Australian branch of the Australian Labor Party (ALP). He was born in Melbourne and educated at the University of Adelaide and Wattle Park Teachers College.

== Career ==
Schacht's political career started as a state party official in 1969 during the Don Dunstan era. In 1987, he entered Federal Parliament as a Labor Party Senator for South Australia. He was Minister for Science and Small Business and Minister assisting the Prime Minister for Science in the Keating Labor Government from March 1993 to March 1994 and then Minister for Small Business, Customs and Construction until Labor's defeat at the 1996 election. He left the parliament in June 2002 after 15 years as a Senator and 33 years in Australian politics.

== Post-parliamentary career ==
In 2006, Senator Robert Ray said of Schacht's "long-winded critiques" of factionalism within the Labor party that "no-one practised factionalism harder than he did. But once he lost influence in his own faction, he condemned all factions." Schacht has openly criticised the influence that he believes trade unions have within the Labor party.

Schacht has supported uranium mining and the prospect of nuclear waste storage in South Australia. He told ABC's Stateline in 2006 that storing the world's nuclear waste "may be the safest thing we can do for the world. Secondly, the world will pay a large amount of money in the future for some place like Australia or outback South Australia to store nuclear waste safely in a safe, in a geologically sound area, with a stable political system."

In 2008 Schacht was appointed as a Director of Marathon Resources. The company's exploration for uranium in Arkaroola later became a subject of controversy. A series of environmental breaches resulted in the revocation of the company's exploration license and the establishment of the Arkaroola Protection Zone.

As of 2015, Schacht is a registered political lobbyist in South Australia. His clients include Pilatus Australia, Liebherr Australia, PMB Defence and Basetec Services. Former clients include VIPAC Engineers and Scientists. Schacht is also the chairman of the Australia China Development Company and an ambassador for the National Secular Lobby.

Schacht is the President of the Australian Volleyball Federation. In October 2006, he was elected to the Legal Commission of the Fédération Internationale de Volleyball for a four-year term.

Political offices
Preceded by Simon Crean (science); David Beddall (small business)	Minister for Science and Small Business; 1994	Succeeded by Peter Cook (science)
Preceded by Peter Cook (customs)	Minister for Small Business, Customs and Construction; 1994–96	Succeeded by Geoff Prosser (small business and customs)
