= David Vigor =

Australian politician (1939–1998)

Senator for South Australia
- In office 1 December 1984 – 5 June 1987

Personal details
- Born: 24 June 1939 Elbeuf, France
- Died: 9 April 1998 (aged 58) Sandy Creek, South Australia
- Party: Democrats (1984–87); Unite Australia (1987)
- Spouse: Susan Vigor (nee Broome)

David Bernard Vigor (26 June 1939 – 9 April 1998) was an Australian politician. He was a member of the Australian Senate, representing the Australian Democrats and the Unite Australia Party.

Born in Elbeuf, France to an English mother and French father, the infant Vigor and his family caught the last ferry to England prior to the start of World War II. After returning to France at war's end, the Vigor family migrated to Adelaide, Australia in 1951.

Vigor attended Adelaide Boys High School and the University of Adelaide, graduating in pure mathematics and French, and then transferred to Monash University as one of its first intake of research students. It was here Vigor met his future wife, Susan.

Following his period at Monash, Vigor lectured in Glasgow for three years while he conducted ground breaking research into data representation and machine intelligence, placing him at the forefront of Information Technology research. After a period based in London working as a consultant on IT and data collection issues, Vigor returned to Adelaide in 1971 as the director of the South Australian Institute of Technology (now the University of South Australia) Computer Centre.

Vigor joined the Liberal Movement soon after its formation and drafted its education and rural policies. Following the party's dissolution, Vigor joined the New LM of Robin Millhouse and was heavily involved in founding the Australian Democrats in 1977.

After unsuccessfully contesting the 1980 and 1983 federal elections, Vigor gained pre-selection to the No. 1 position on the South Australian Democrats' Senate ticket at the 1984 election and gained election as a senator for that state.

As a senator, Vigor was notable for his lengthy questioning of government policy during Senate committees and Question Time. He also worked on issues like a scheme to provide risk capital to inventors, effective labelling and packaging of consumer products, the introduction of the Hare-Clark voting system to the Australian Capital Territory, highlighting problems with the Australia Card and banning smoking on aircraft. Vigor was the first politician to attempt to legislate a class actions regime in Australia.

Vigor's time in the Senate was cut short when the Hawke Labor government called a double dissolution election in 1987. He lost pre-selection for the winnable first position on the Democrats' Senate ticket to party leader Janine Haines and, in response, joined fellow disaffected Democrat Senator John Siddons's Unite Australia Party (UAP). Vigor stood unsuccessfully as the UAP's lead South Australian Senate candidate at the 1987 election and returned to computer consultancy and software development.

Vigor died from a heart attack at his home in Sandy Creek, South Australia, aged 58, survived by his wife, five sons, two daughters and seven grandchildren.
