= Tony Messner =

Australian politician (1939–2024)

The Honourable Tony Messner AM

Administrator of Norfolk Island
- In office 4 August 1997 – 30 July 2003
- Monarch: Elizabeth II
- Governors-General: Sir William Deane; Peter Hollingsworth; Michael Jeffrey
- Preceded by: Alan Kerr
- Succeeded by: Grant Tambling

Minister for Veterans' Affairs
- In office 3 November 1980 – 11 March 1983
- Prime Minister: Malcolm Fraser
- Preceded by: Evan Adermann
- Succeeded by: Arthur Gietzelt

Senator for South Australia
- In office 13 December 1975 – 17 April 1990
- Succeeded by: John Olsen

Personal details
- Born: 24 September 1939 Melbourne, Victoria, Australia
- Died: 11 October 2024 (aged 85)
- Party: Liberal
- Profession: Accountant

Anthony John Messner AM (24 September 1939 – 11 October 2024) was an Australian politician and government minister.

== Life and career ==
Messner was born in Melbourne and educated at a state primary school in Queensland, Pulteney Grammar School, Adelaide and the South Australian Institute of Technology.

Messner was elected as a Senator for South Australia at the 1975 election. He was appointed Minister for Veterans' Affairs in November 1980 and held that position until the defeat of the Fraser government at the March 1983 election. He resigned from parliament in April 1990.

Messner was Administrator of Norfolk Island from August 1997 to July 2003. He was made a member of the Order of Australia in 2004 for "service to the Australian Parliament, to Norfolk Island as Administrator, and to the community, particularly veterans and their families".

Messner died on 11 October 2024, at the age of 85.

== Notes ==
Political offices
Preceded by Evan Adermann	Minister for Veterans' Affairs; 1980–1983	Succeeded by Arthur Gietzelt
