= Baden Teague =

Australian politician

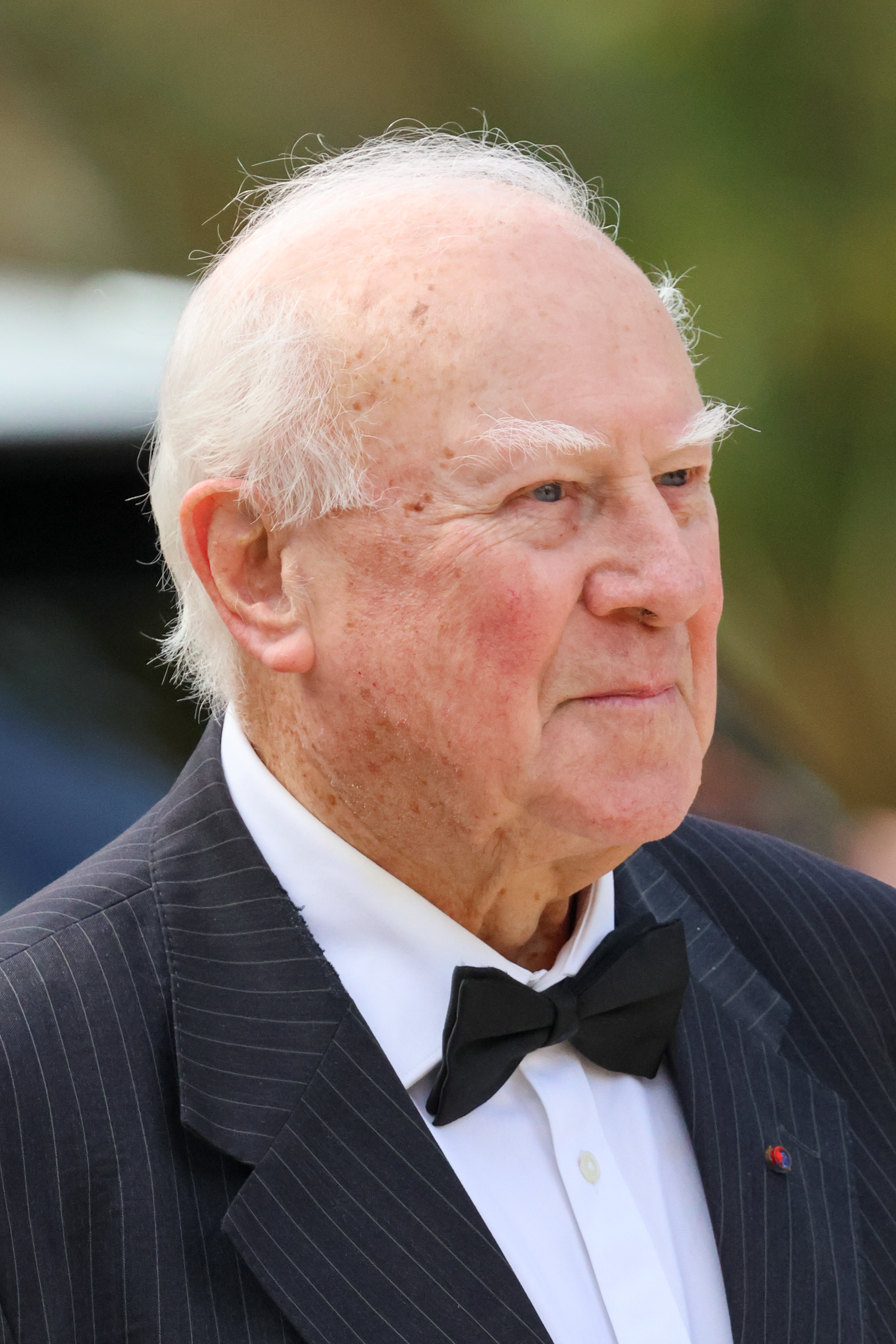
- Teague at the Adelaide Festival Centre in 2026

Senator for South Australia
- In office 1 July 1978 – 30 June 1996

Personal details
- Born: 18 September 1944 (age 82) Adelaide, South Australia
- Party: Liberal
- Children: Josh Teague

Baden Chapman Teague (born 18 September 1944) is an Australian former politician who served as a Liberal senator for South Australia from 1977 until his retirement in 1996.

== Early life ==
Teague was born on 18 September 1944 at the Ashford Hospital, Adelaide. He was the second of three children born to Nita Kathleen (née Readett) and Colin Archibald Teague. His father was a builder.

Teague was raised in Glenelg and Somerton Park. He attended St Peter's College, Adelaide, from 1955 to 1962, where he was dux in his final year and played tennis and football. He went on to study history, mathematics and physics at the University of Adelaide, graduating Bachelor of Arts (Hons.) in 1967 and Bachelor of Science in 1968. He was accepted to the University of Cambridge as a postgraduate student in the history of ideas and was awarded a Ph.D. in 1972 for a thesis title "The origins of Robert Boyle's philosophy".

In 1972, Teague returned to the University of Adelaide and was appointed welfare officer, where his responsibilities included the administration of student loans. He was also a part-time lecturer on the history of ideas and chairman of the University of Adelaide Theatre Guild.

== Politics ==
Teague joined the Liberal and Country League in 1973. He became president of the party's Magill branch and served on the party's state executive and state council. In 1975 he unsuccessfully sought preselection for the federal seat of Barker.

Teague was elected to the Senate at the 1977 federal election, winning a six-year term beginning on 1 July 1978. He was re-elected to further terms at the 1983, 1984, 1987 and 1990 elections, with his final term concluding on 30 June 1996.

Teague narrowly won the final South Australian Senate position from the then newly formed Australian Democrats after preferences from the Australia Party flowed to Teague ahead of the Democrats. Observers with a sense of irony would have noted that many Australian Democrats, including lead Democrat Senate candidate Ian Gilfillan, were former Australia Party members and the Democrats had initially expected Australia Party preferences.

During his Senate term, Teague introduced a private members bill to change the system of government in Australia from a Constitutional Monarchy to a Republic.

== Later life ==
Following his retirement from politics, Teague served as the South Australian Chairman of the Australian Republican Movement, and was elected as a delegate to the Australian Republic Convention.

== Personal life ==
In 1972, Teague married Katherine Packard, with whom he had three sons. His son Josh Teague was elected to the parliament of South Australia in 2018.
