= Ron Elstob =

Australian politician (1924–2023)

Senator for South Australia
- In office 1 July 1978 – 5 June 1987
- Preceded by: Don Cameron
- Succeeded by: Chris Schacht

Personal details
- Born: 29 November 1924 Toowoomba, Queensland
- Died: 16 March 2023 (aged 98)
- Party: Labor
- Occupation: Waterside worker

Ronald Charles Elstob (29 November 1924 – 16 March 2023) was an Australian politician. He served as a Senator for South Australia from 1978 to 1987, representing the Australian Labor Party (ALP). He was a waterside worker and trade unionist prior to his election to parliament.

== Early life ==
Elstob was born on 29 November 1924 in Toowoomba, Queensland, one of three children born to Ann (née Terbutt) and Charles Elstob. He began his education at the Toowoomba East State School. His parents were both from New South Wales and in 1938 the family moved to Sydney, where they ran a hotel in Newtown.

== Military service ==
In 1942, Elstob joined the US Army Small Ships Section, a collection of small-draft vessels crewed mostly by Australian civilians. He participated in "supply runs to Milne Bay, Port Moresby and other locations along the New Guinea coast". He was later stranded at Finschhafen for a period after his ship was sunk by a Japanese Zero fighter. He was unable to return to Australia and instead became a coastwatcher. Elstob later recalled that "his life was constantly in danger and he was forced into drastic and violent actions to stay alive". He was shot in the ankle and lost an eye.

== Post-war career ==
After the war, Elstob worked as a travelling equipment salesman. He eventually settled in Adelaide and worked as a crane driver on the Port Adelaide waterside. He joined the Waterside Workers' Federation in 1949 and was a vice-president of the Port Adelaide branch, also serving as a delegate to the Trades and Labour Council.

== Politics ==
Elstob joined the Australian Labor Party in 1939 as a member of the East Sydney branch. After moving to South Australia he joined the Hindmarsh and became an officebearer. He was a delegate to ALP state conference.

In December 1976, Elstob won ALP preselection for the Senate. He was elected in second place on the ALP ticket at the 1977 federal election, to a term beginning on 1 July 1978. He was re-elected at the 1983 election. In the Senate Elstob chaired the Standing Committee on Social Welfare and the Publications Committee. He was forced to retire at the 1987 election due to the ALP's preselection rules.

== Personal life and death ==
Elstob married Angela Smerlac in 1949, with whom he had two daughters. He was a black-belt in taekwondo. He retired to Mountain Creek, Queensland, after leaving the Senate.

Elstob died on 16 March 2023, at the age of 98.
