= Dominic Foreman =

Australian politician (1933–2020)

Senator for South Australia
- In office 1 July 1981 – 15 September 1997
- Succeeded by: John Quirke

Personal details
- Born: 6 August 1933 Clare, South Australia
- Died: 17 July 2020 (aged 86) Adelaide, South Australia
- Party: Labor
- Spouse(s): Margaret O'Brien (1957–1960); Shirley Lewis (1987–2008)

Dominic John Foreman (6 August 1933 – 17 July 2020) was an Australian politician. He was a union official and South Australian Secretary of the Vehicle Builders' Employees' Union before entering politics. From 1979 to 1980 he was President of the South Australian Labor Party. In 1980, he was elected to the Australian Senate as a Labor Senator for South Australia. He held the seat until his resignation in 1997; John Quirke was appointed to replace him.
