= Candidates of the 1977 Australian federal election =

This article provides information on candidates who stood for the 1977 Australian federal election. The election was held on 10 December 1977.

== Redistributions and seat changes ==
- Redistributions occurred in all states except Tasmania.
  - In New South Wales, the Labor-held seats of Darling and Lang and the Liberal-held seat of Evans were abolished. The new notionally Liberal seat of Dundas was created. The Liberal-held seat of Parramatta and the NCP-held seat of Riverina became notionally Labor, while the Labor-held seat of Robertson became notionally Liberal.
    - The member for Darling, John FitzPatrick (Labor), contested Riverina.
    - The member for Grayndler, Tony Whitlam (Labor), contested St George.
    - The member for Lang, Frank Stewart (Labor), contested Grayndler.
    - The member for Mackellar, Bill Wentworth (Independent Liberal), contested the Senate.
    - The member for Parramatta, Philip Ruddock (Liberal), contested Dundas.
  - In Victoria, the NCP-held seat of Wimmera was abolished.
    - The member for Hotham, Don Chipp (Democrats), contested the Senate.
    - The member for Isaacs, David Hamer (Liberal), contested the Senate.
  - In Queensland, the new notionally Liberal seat of Fadden was created.
    - The member for Griffith, Don Cameron (Liberal), contested Fadden.
  - In Western Australia, the Liberal-held seat of Swan became notionally Labor.
    - The member for Tangney, Peter Richardson (Progress), contested the Senate.
  - In South Australia, the Liberal-held seat of Angas was abolished, and the Labor-held seats of Grey and Hawker became notionally Liberal.
    - The member for Angas, Geoffrey Giles (Liberal), contested Wakefield.
    - South Australian Senator Steele Hall (Liberal) resigned from the Senate to contest Hawker.

== Retiring Members and Senators ==
=== Labor ===
- Kim Beazley MP (Fremantle, WA)
- Jim Cairns MP (Lalor, Vic)
- Frank Crean MP (Melbourne Ports, Vic)
- Horrie Garrick MP (Batman, Vic)
- Senator Don Cameron (SA)
- Senator Don Devitt (Tas)

=== Liberal ===
- John Abel MP (Evans, NSW)
- Robert Bonnett MP (Herbert, Qld)
- Bert Kelly MP (Wakefield, WA)
- Senator Sir Magnus Cormack (Vic)
- Senator Ian Wood (Qld)
- Senator Reg Wright (Tas) — quit the Liberal Party shortly before his term concluded in June 1978.

=== National Country ===
- Robert King MP (Wimmera, Vic)
- Senator Tom Drake-Brockman (WA)

=== Democrats ===
- Senator Janine Haines (SA)

== House of Representatives ==
Sitting members at the time of the election are shown in bold text. Successful candidates are highlighted in the relevant colour. Where there is possible confusion, an asterisk (*) is also used.

=== Australian Capital Territory ===
Electorate	Held by	Labor candidate	Liberal candidate	Democrats candidate	Independent candidate
Canberra	Liberal	Henry Lawrence	**John Haslem**	John Bellhouse	Oleg Kavunenko
Fraser	Labor	**Ken Fry**	George Mailath		

=== New South Wales ===
Electorate	Held by	Labor candidate	Coalition candidate	Democrats candidate	Other candidates
Banks	Labor	**Vince Martin**	Paul Hinton (Lib)	Montague Greene	
Barton	Liberal	Ron Cunningham	**Jim Bradfield** (Lib)	Phil White	Charles Bellchambers (Ind)
Bennelong	Liberal	Noel Welsman	**John Howard** (Lib)	Bruce Irwin	David Rennie (Prog)
Berowra	Liberal	Michael Jones	**Harry Edwards** (Lib)	Johannes van Aggele	George Simpson (Prog)
Blaxland	Labor	**Paul Keating**	Salvatore Napoli (Lib)	Steven Suli	William Haggerty (Ind)
Bradfield	Liberal	Pauline Kibble	**David Connolly** (Lib)	Donald Marrable	Christopher Brown (Prog)
Calare	NCP	David Simmons	James Ashton (Lib)	Darvell Baird	
Calare	NCP	David Simmons	**Sandy Mackenzie*** (NCP)	Darvell Baird	
Chifley	Labor	**John Armitage**	Richard Taylor (Lib)	Alfred Tozer	Jack Mundey (CPA)
Cook	Liberal	Ray Thorburn	**Don Dobie** (Lib)	Walter Day	Henry Soper (Prog)
Cowper	NCP	Colin Clague	**Ian Robinson** (NCP)		
Cunningham	Labor	**Stewart West**	Thomas Griffin (Lib)	Ross Sampson	Noel Dennett (Ind); Rudolph Dezelin (Ind); Mervyn Nixon (CPA)
Dundas	Liberal	Russell Rollason	**Philip Ruddock** (Lib)	Brendan Mohide	Malcolm McKinnon (Prog)
Eden-Monaro	Liberal	Brian Maguire	**Murray Sainsbury** (Lib)	Norma Helmers	Michael Le Grand (Ind)
Farrer	Liberal	Donald Fleming	**Wal Fife** (Lib)	Margaret Healey	Thomas Guy (Ind); Maureen Nathan (Prog)
Grayndler	Labor	**Frank Stewart**	Bill Vasselou (Lib)	Christine Townend	Frank Vouros (SPA)
Gwydir	NCP	Francis Fish	**Ralph Hunt** (NCP)	Heather Howe	Brian Allen (Prog); Lyall Munro (Ind)
Hughes	Labor	**Les Johnson**	Henry Halliwell (Lib)	Kenneth Johnson	
Hume	NCP	George Brenner	**Stephen Lusher** (NCP)	Mark Richard	
Hunter	Labor	**Bert James**	Oliver Fennell (Lib)	Elisabeth Kirkby	
Kingsford-Smith	Labor	**Lionel Bowen**	Collin O'Neill (Lib)	Edward Ward	
Lowe	Liberal	Dick Hall	**Sir William McMahon** (Lib)	Frederick Tross	Charles Bingle (Ind)
Lyne	NCP	Noel Unicomb	**Philip Lucock** (NCP)	Allen Edwards	
Macarthur	Liberal	John Kerin	**Michael Baume** (Lib)	William Speirs	Victor Thomas (Prog)
Mackellar	Liberal	John Barclay	Jim Carlton (Lib)	Robert Williams	John Booth (Prog); Ronald Davis (Ind); Barry Geyle (Ind); Thomas Mellor (Ind)
Macquarie	Liberal	Ross Free	**Reg Gillard** (Lib)	Peter Monaghan	Michael Barratt (Ind); Alyn Foster (Prog)
Mitchell	Liberal	Ellen Thompson	**Alan Cadman** (Lib)	Michael Hartnell	Ronald Allen (Ind); Dimitar Mikulasev (Prog)
New England	NCP	Selby Dean	**Ian Sinclair** (NCP)	Bradley Mulligan	
Newcastle	Labor	**Charles Jones**	Elaine Samuels (Lib)	Ian Hay	Darrell Dawson (CPA)
North Sydney	Liberal	Maurice May	**Bill Graham** (Lib)	John Pierce	Peter Corrie (Prog); John Maher (Ind)
Parramatta	Labor	John Brown	Douglas Cox (Lib)	Peter Lukunic	
Paterson	NCP	Kerry Scott	**Frank O'Keefe** (NCP)	Paul Baker	William O'Donnell (Ind)
Phillip	Liberal	Joe Riordan	**Jack Birney** (Lib)	Alan Needham	Barry Elliott (Ind)
Prospect	Labor	**Dick Klugman**	Alan Byers (Lib)	Laurence Bourke	
Reid	Labor	**Tom Uren**	Terence Shanahan (Lib)	Frederick Bluck	
Richmond	NCP	Josephine Maxwell	**Doug Anthony** (NCP)	Bernard Walrut	John Mallett (Ind)
Riverina	Labor	**John FitzPatrick**	**John Sullivan** (NCP)		Rodney Lawrence (Ind)
Robertson	Liberal	**Barry Cohen**	Malcolm Brooks (Lib)	Trevor Willsher	
Shortland	Labor	**Peter Morris**	Richard Bevan (Lib)	Lionel Lambkin	
St George	Liberal	**Tony Whitlam**	**Maurice Neil** (Lib)	Ronald Kirwood	David Kriss (Prog)
Sydney	Labor	**Les McMahon**	Andrew Morrison (Lib)	Judith Roberts	Aileen Beaver (CPA); Harry Black (SPA); Naomi Mayers (Ind)
Warringah	Liberal	Christopher Osborne	**Michael MacKellar** (Lib)	Anita Stiller	Stephen Keliher (Prog)
Wentworth	Liberal	Michael Winters	**Bob Ellicott** (Lib)	Joan Kersey	John Curvers (Prog)
Werriwa	Labor	**Gough Whitlam**	Jonas Abromas (Lib)	Keith Olson	Ross May (Ind)

=== Northern Territory ===
Electorate	Held by	Labor candidate	CLP candidate	Democrats candidate	Progress candidate
Northern Territory	CLP	John Waters	**Sam Calder**	Josephine Read	Ian Smith

=== Queensland ===
Electorate	Held by	Labor candidate	Coalition candidate	Democrats candidate	Progress candidate	Independent candidate
Bowman	Liberal	Len Keogh	**David Jull** (Lib)	Bryan Grehan	Martin Gant	
Brisbane	Liberal	Manfred Cross	**Peter Johnson** (Lib)	Joan Hadley	John Steele	
Capricornia	NCP	Doug Everingham	**Colin Carige** (NCP); Douglas Cuddy (Lib)	Edward Batey	Ronald Kitching	
Darling Downs	NCP	Robert Lingard	**Tom McVeigh** (NCP)		David Proud	
Dawson	NCP	Michael Goldsborough	**Ray Braithwaite** (NCP)		Frank Paull	
Fadden	Liberal	Clem Jones	**Don Cameron*** (Lib)	Janice Barber	Peter Gautrey	Melody Bond
Fadden	Liberal	Clem Jones	James Shapcott (NCP)	Janice Barber	Peter Gautrey	Melody Bond
Fisher	NCP	Fay Price	**Evan Adermann** (NCP)	Gillian Newman	Gregory Gaffney	
Griffith	Liberal	Ben Humphreys	Stan Fas (NCP); Ronald Palmer (Lib)	Thomas Martin	Barrie Rundle	William Kenney
Herbert	Liberal	Ted Lindsay	Charles Arnold (NCP)	Kenneth Kipping	Coral Finlay	Peter Dunn; Grahame Wells
Herbert	Liberal	Ted Lindsay	Gordon Dean* (Lib)	Kenneth Kipping	Coral Finlay	Peter Dunn; Grahame Wells
Kennedy	NCP	Robert Gleeson	**Bob Katter** (NCP)	Marelle Hicks; Raymond Oldham	Vrettos Cominos	
Leichhardt	NCP	Bill Wood	**David Thomson** (NCP)	James Foster		
Lilley	Liberal	Elaine Darling	**Kevin Cairns** (Lib)	Albert Mayne	Gary Sturgess	Frank Andrews
Maranoa	NCP	John Kidman	**James Corbett** (NCP)	Betty Whitworth	Maurice Fountain	Christopher Caldwell
McPherson	Liberal	Jon Guerson	**Eric Robinson** (Lib)	Leonard Fairman	Neva Maxim	William Aabraham-Steer
Moreton	Liberal	Barbara Robson	**James Killen** (Lib)	Dirk Plooy	Frederick Drake	Graham Bell
Oxley	Labor	**Bill Hayden**	Robert Walker (Lib)	Rowlynd Jones	Neil Russell	
Petrie	Liberal	Gerard Molloy	**John Hodges** (Lib)	Leslie Mundt	Rodney Jeanneret	
Ryan	Liberal	Gailene Harrison	**John Moore** (Lib)		Jili Boughen	
Wide Bay	NCP	Frederick Faircloth	**Clarrie Millar** (NCP)	Douglas Mackenzie		

=== South Australia ===
Electorate	Held by	Labor candidate	Liberal candidate	Democrats candidate	Other candidates
Adelaide	Labor	**Chris Hurford**	George Basisovs	Geoffrey Stewart	
Barker	Liberal	Neil Richardson	**James Porter**	Rodney Roberts	
Bonython	Labor	Neal Blewett	Brian Marsden	John Longhurst	
Boothby	Liberal	Mark Pickhaver	**John McLeay**	George Nimmo	
Grey	Liberal	**Laurie Wallis**	John Oswald	Ronald Moulds	John Henderson (NCP)
Hawker	Liberal	**Ralph Jacobi**	Steele Hall	Bruce Miels	Warren Wallace (Ind)
Hindmarsh	Labor	**Clyde Cameron**	Gregory Molfetas	James Evans	
Kingston	Liberal	Richard Gun	**Grant Chapman**	Christopher Harte	
Port Adelaide	Labor	**Mick Young**	Jean Lawrie	David Wade	Donald Sutherland (CPA)
Sturt	Liberal	Ann Pengelly	**Ian Wilson**	Dean Bendall	
Wakefield	Liberal	Denis Crisp	**Geoffrey Giles**	Kenneth Maguire	

=== Tasmania ===
Electorate	Held by	Labor candidate	Liberal candidate	Democrats candidate
Bass	Liberal	Mary Willey	**Kevin Newman**	Dennis Cartledge
Braddon	Liberal	Duncan Kerr	**Ray Groom**	
Denison	Liberal	John Coates	**Michael Hodgman**	Robert McFie
Franklin	Liberal	Peter Colquhoun	**Bruce Goodluck**	
Wilmot	Liberal	David Llewellyn	**Max Burr**	Leon Gourlay

=== Victoria ===
Electorate	Held by	Labor candidate	Coalition candidate	Democrats candidate	DLP candidate	Other candidates
Balaclava	Liberal	Robert Steele	**Ian Macphee** (Lib)	Zelma Furey	Peter Lawlor	
Ballarat	Liberal	Norman Baker	**Jim Short** (Lib)	Graham Gough	William Griffin	
Batman	Labor	Brian Howe	Gillford Brown (Lib)	Mario Piraino	Phillip Lorenz	
Bendigo	Liberal	Dennis Muldoon	**John Bourchier** (Lib)	Ian Price	Paul Brennan	
Bruce	Liberal	Timothy Burke	**Billy Snedden** (Lib)	John Sutcliffe	John Mulholland	
Burke	Labor	**Keith Johnson**	Mihaly Lengyel (Lib)	Eric Spencer	Colin Walsh	
Casey	Liberal	Peter Watson	**Peter Falconer** (Lib)	Malcolm Whittle	Francis Feltham	Martin Hetherich (Ind); Stanley Hillman (Ind); Henry Leggett (Ind)
Chisholm	Liberal	Helen Mayer	**Tony Staley** (Lib)	Robert Caulfield	Joe Stanley	
Corangamite	Liberal	Shirley Ambrose	**Tony Street** (Lib)	Kathleen May	Francis O'Brien	Neil McDonald (Ind)
Corio	Labor	**Gordon Scholes**	Clive Bubb (Lib)	Guenter Sahr	James Jordan	
Deakin	Liberal	Neville Gay	**Alan Jarman** (Lib)	Alan Teed	Daniel Condon	
Diamond Valley	Liberal	Jean Downing	**Neil Brown** (Lib)	Ronald Goldman	Christopher Curtis	
Flinders	Liberal	Geoffrey Eastwood	**Phillip Lynch** (Lib)	Harold Fraser	John Cass	Monty Hollow (Ind)
Gellibrand	Labor	**Ralph Willis**	Anton Zajc (Lib)	June Smith	Bert Bailey	
Gippsland	NCP	William Switzer	**Peter Nixon** (NCP)	Thomas Reid	Robert McMahon	Bruce Ingle (Ind)
Henty	Liberal	Joan Child	**Ken Aldred** (Lib)	Fred Ingamells	Terence Farrell	Tony Dear (Ind)
Higgins	Liberal	Ann Jackson	**Roger Shipton** (Lib)	Jim Thornley	Martin Cahill	
Holt	Liberal	Michael Duffy	**William Yates** (Lib)	Brian Stockton	Kevin Leydon	
Hotham	Liberal	Tony Ross	Roger Johnston (Lib)	Kenneth Weaver	Edward Woods	
Indi	NCP	John Dennis	Ewen Cameron* (Lib)	Neil Savage	Christopher Cody	
Indi	NCP	John Dennis	**Mac Holten** (NCP)	Neil Savage	Christopher Cody	
Isaacs	Liberal	Kenneth Williams	Bill Burns (Lib)	Francis McLeod	Ralph Cleary	
Kooyong	Liberal	John Wilkinson	**Andrew Peacock** (Lib)	Michael McBride	Bernie Gaynor	
Lalor	Labor	Barry Jones	Harley Dickinson (Lib)	Charles Skidmore	Denis Bilston	Jeffrey Day (Ind); Rosalba Vicari (Ind)
La Trobe	Liberal	Tony Lamb	**Marshall Baillieu** (Lib)	Andrew McCann	James Penna	Cornelus Hellema (Ind)
Mallee	NCP	Geoffrey Ferns	**Peter Fisher*** (NCP)		John Cotter	
Mallee	NCP	Geoffrey Ferns	Warwick Hincksman (Lib)		John Cotter	
Maribyrnong	Labor	**Moss Cass**	Philip Fitzherbert (Lib)	Alan Brass	Alan Tait	
McMillan	Liberal	Richard Elkington	**Barry Simon** (Lib)	Ronald Dent	Brian Handley	Norman Holyoak (Ind)
Melbourne	Labor	**Ted Innes**	Robert Fallshaw (Lib)	Veronica Schwarz	Desmond Burke	Roger Wilson (CPA)
Melbourne Ports	Labor	Clyde Holding	Daniel Hill (Lib)	Valina Rainer	Gordon Haberman	
Murray	NCP	Graeme Macartney	**Bruce Lloyd*** (NCP)	George Murray	Patrick Payne	
Murray	NCP	Graeme Macartney	Robert Love (Lib)	George Murray	Patrick Payne	
Scullin	Labor	**Harry Jenkins**	Gerard Clarke (Lib)	George Samargis	Bernard McGrath	
Wannon	Liberal	Andrew Frost	**Malcolm Fraser** (Lib)	Thelma Trayling	John Casanova	
Wills	Labor	**Gordon Bryant**	Thomas Burrowes (Lib)	Vernon Weaver	John Flint	

=== Western Australia ===
Electorate	Held by	Labor candidate	Liberal candidate	Democrats candidate	NCP candidate	Progress candidate	Other candidates
Canning	Liberal	Charles Savage	**Mel Bungey**	Velibor Debeljakovic	Marie Dilley	Douglas Joyce	John English (Ind)
Curtin	Liberal	Patricia Giles	**Victor Garland**	Richard Bunting		James MacDonald	
Forrest	Liberal	Allan Drake-Brockman	**Peter Drummond**	Donald Stewart	John Gardiner	Reginald Crabb	
Fremantle	Labor	John Dawkins	Peter Ramshaw	John Kernot		David Lavater	Vic Slater (CPA)
Kalgoorlie	Liberal	Brian Conway	**Mick Cotter**	Edwin Routley	Squire Fletcher	Graham Mills	
Moore	Liberal	James Hansen	**John Hyde**	Patricia Edward	Roy Clarke	Maurice Brockwell	
Perth	Liberal	James Moiler	**Ross McLean**	Thomas Garrick		Lawrence Curtis	
Stirling	Liberal	Graham Reece	**Ian Viner**	Scott Christie		James Jamieson	
Swan	Labor	Patricia Fowkes	**John Martyr**	Hubert Lennerts		Bryan Scott-Courtland	William Deller (Ind)
Tangney	Liberal	Duncan Graham	Peter Shack	Geoffrey Taylor		Geoffrey McNeil	

== Senate ==
Sitting Senators are shown in bold text. Tickets that elected at least one Senator are highlighted in the relevant colour. Successful candidates are identified by an asterisk (*).

=== Australian Capital Territory ===
Two seats were up for election. The Labor Party was defending one seat. The Liberal Party was defending one seat.

Labor candidates	Liberal candidates	Group A candidates	Other candidates
1. **Susan Ryan***; 2. Robert Smith	1. **John Knight***; 2. Stanley Sparrow	1. Anthony O'Dea; 2. Noel McCann	Gerhard Zatschler (MAR); Donald Evans (Dem)

=== New South Wales ===
Five seats were up for election. The Labor Party was defending three seats. The Liberal-NCP Coalition was defending two seats. Senators John Carrick (Liberal), Bob Cotton (Liberal), Doug McClelland (Labor), Jim McClelland (Labor) and Douglas Scott (National Country) were not up for re-election.

Labor candidates	Coalition candidates	Democrats candidates	CTA candidates	Australia candidates	Progress candidates
1. **Tony Mulvihill***; 2. **Arthur Gietzelt***; 3. **Kerry Sibraa**	1. **Peter Baume*** (Lib); 2. **Misha Lajovic*** (Lib); 3. Dorothy Ross (NCP)	1. Colin Mason*; 2. Paul McLean; 3. Malcolm Hilbery; 4. Ronald Mallett; 5. Patricia Clark	1. Fred Nile; 2. Reuben Scarf; 3. Patricia Judge	1. John Notary; 2. Clifford Willard; 3. Allan Jones	1. Barry Bracken; 2. Robert Howard; 3. Robert Schollbach
Marijuana candidates	Socialist candidates	Group C candidates	Group E candidates	Group G candidates	Ungrouped candidates
1. James Billington; 2. Diana Fuller; 3. Peter Livesey	1. Edgar Woodbury; 2. Pat Clancy	1. Allan Chan; 2. Chan Chung Ling	1. Shirley Smith; 2. Bruce Miles; 3. Cecil Patten; 4. Christos Roumeliotis	1. Bill Wentworth; 2. Leah Young	Henry Harding; John Esposito

=== Northern Territory ===
Two seats were up for election. The Labor Party was defending one seat. The Country Liberal Party was defending one seat.

Labor candidates	CLP candidates	Democrats candidates	Progress candidates
1. **Ted Robertson***; 2. Harry Maschke	1. **Bernie Kilgariff***; 2. Barry Wyatt	1. Dennis Booth; 2. Peter Dean	1. Kenneth Kitto; 2. David Cooper

=== Queensland ===
Five seats were up for election. The Labor Party was defending two seats. The Liberal-NCP Coalition was defending three seats. Senators Neville Bonner (Liberal), Jim Keeffe (Labor), Ron Maunsell (National Country), Ron McAuliffe (Labor) and Glen Sheil (National Country) were not up for re-election.

Labor candidates	Coalition candidates	Democrats candidates	Progress candidates	Socialist candidates	Group C candidates
1. **George Georges***; 2. **Mal Colston***; 3. Verona Wake	1. **Kathy Martin*** (Lib); 2. **Stan Collard*** (NCP); 3. David MacGibbon* (Lib)	1. Paul Griffin; 2. Michael Macklin; 3. Maureen Burton	1. Vivian Forbes; 2. Owen Pershouse; 3. Suzanne Ham; 4. Barrie Fulcher	1. Charles Murphy; 2. David Ryan; 3. Ivan Ivanoff	1. Anne Glew; 2. Geoffrey Crouch
Group D candidates	Ungrouped candidates				
1. James Drabsch; 2. Lloyd Drabsch; 3. Ace Drabsch	John Jones; Bruce Chambers				

=== South Australia ===
Five seats were up for election. The Labor Party was defending two seats. The Liberal Party was defending two seats. One seat had been held by the Australian Democrats following its resignation by the Liberal Movement's Steele Hall. Senators Reg Bishop (Labor), Jim Cavanagh (Labor), Gordon Davidson (Liberal), Don Jessop (Liberal) and Condor Laucke (Liberal) were not up for re-election.

Labor candidates	Liberal candidates	Democrats candidates	Australia candidates	Progress candidates	Socialist candidates
1. **Geoff McLaren***; 2. Ron Elstob*; 3. Nick Bolkus	1. **Tony Messner***; 2. **Harold Young***; 3. Baden Teague*	1. Ian Gilfillan; 2. Michael Lee; 3. Nicholas Theologou	1. Colyn van Reenen; 2. Kathy Dancer	1. John Whiting; 2. Verna Oakley	1. Alan Miller; 2. Muriel Goss
Group F candidates	Ungrouped candidates				
1. George Jukes; 2. Jean Jukes	Stephen Dimitriou (MAR); Andrew Jones (Ind)				

=== Tasmania ===
Five seats were up for election. The Labor Party was defending two seats. The Liberal Party was defending three seats, although retiring Senator Reg Wright had become an independent at the end of his term. Senators Brian Harradine (Independent), Justin O'Byrne (Labor), Peter Rae (Liberal), Michael Townley (Liberal) and Ken Wriedt (Labor) were not up for re-election.

Labor candidates	Liberal candidates	Democrats candidates	Group C candidates
1. **Don Grimes***; 2. Michael Tate*; 3. John White	1. **Shirley Walters***; 2. **Brian Archer***; 3. John Watson*	1. Norman Siberry; 2. Liz Holloway	1. Rudge Townley; 2. Ann Waterhouse

=== Victoria ===
Five seats were up for election. The Labor Party was defending two seats. The Liberal-NCP Coalition was defending three seats. Senators Ivor Greenwood (Liberal), Margaret Guilfoyle (Liberal), Jean Melzer (Labor), Cyril Primmer (Labor) and James Webster (National Country) were not up for re-election.

Labor candidates	Coalition candidates	Democrats candidates	DLP candidates	Australia candidates	Socialist candidates
1. Gareth Evans*; 2. **John Button***; 3. **Bill Brown**	1. **Alan Missen*** (Lib); 2. David Hamer* (Lib); 3. **Tom Tehan** (NCP)	1. Don Chipp*; 2. John Siddons; 3. Janice Bateman; 4. Harold Jeffrey; 5. Neil Sleep	1. Jim Brosnan; 2. Les Hilton; 3. Paul McManus	1. Derek Kruse; 2. David Heath; 3. Gail Farrell	1. Ron Hearn; 2. Trevor McCandless; 3. Hariklia Kokkinos
Marijuana candidates	Group B candidates	Ungrouped candidates			
1. Jay McRoach; 2. Peter McKenzie	1. Carolyn Ingvarson; 2. Elizabeth Morton; 3. Marie Quinn	Shane Watson; Ronald Batey; Peter Kavanagh; Terence Vine			

=== Western Australia ===
Five seats were up for election. The Labor Party was defending two seats. The Liberal Party was defending two seats. The National Country Party was defending one seat. Senators Peter Durack (Liberal), Gordon McIntosh (Labor), Peter Sim (Liberal), John Wheeldon (Labor) and Reg Withers (Liberal) were not up for re-election.

Labor candidates	Coalition candidates	Democrats candidates	NCP candidates	Progress candidates	Group E candidates	Ungrouped candidates
1. **Peter Walsh***; 2. **Ruth Coleman***; 3. Howard Olney	1. **Fred Chaney***; 2. **Andrew Thomas***; 3. Allan Rocher*	1. Jack Evans; 2. Uri Themal; 3. Shirley de la Hunty	1. Donald Eckersley; 2. Donald Thomas; 3. Moira Jones	1. Peter Richardson; 2. Robert Scott; 3. Janet Beeck	1. Francesco Nesci; 2. Nellie Stuart	Geoffrey Gray; John Cowley

== Summary by party ==
Beside each party is the number of seats contested by that party in the House of Representatives for each state, as well as an indication of whether the party contested the Senate election in the respective state.

Party	NSW		Vic		Qld		WA		SA		Tas		ACT		NT		Total	
Party	HR	S	HR	S	HR	S	HR	S	HR	S	HR	S	HR	S	HR	S	HR	S
Australian Labor Party	43	*	33	*	19	*	10	*	11	*	5	*	2	*	1	*	124	8
Liberal Party of Australia	35	*	32	*	12	*	10	*	11	*	5	*	2	*			107	7
National Country Party	9	*	4	*	11	*	4	*	1								29	4
Country Liberal Party															1	*	1	1
Australian Democrats	41	*	32	*	17	*	10	*	11	*	3	*	1	*	1	*	116	8
Progress Party	15	*			16	*	10	*		*					1	*	42	5
Democratic Labor Party			33	*													33	1
Communist Party of Australia	4		1				1		1								7	
Socialist Party of Australia	2	*		*		*				*							2	4
Australian Marijuana Party		*		*						*				*				4
Australia Party		*		*						*								3
Call to Australia		*																1
Independent and other	20		11		8		2		1				1				43	

== See also ==
- 1977 Australian federal election
- Members of the Australian House of Representatives, 1975–1977
- Members of the Australian House of Representatives, 1977–1980
- Members of the Australian Senate, 1975–1978
- Members of the Australian Senate, 1978–1981
- List of political parties in Australia
