= 1977 Australian Senate election =

Australian federal election results

1977 Australian Senate elections
- 10 December 1977

34 of the 64 seats in the Australian Senate 33 seats needed for a majority
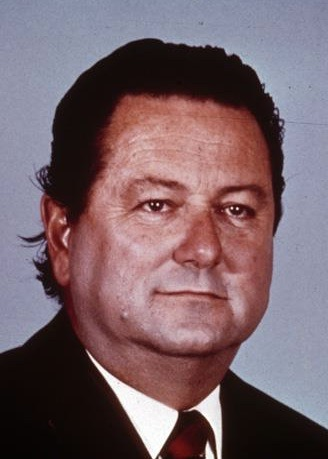

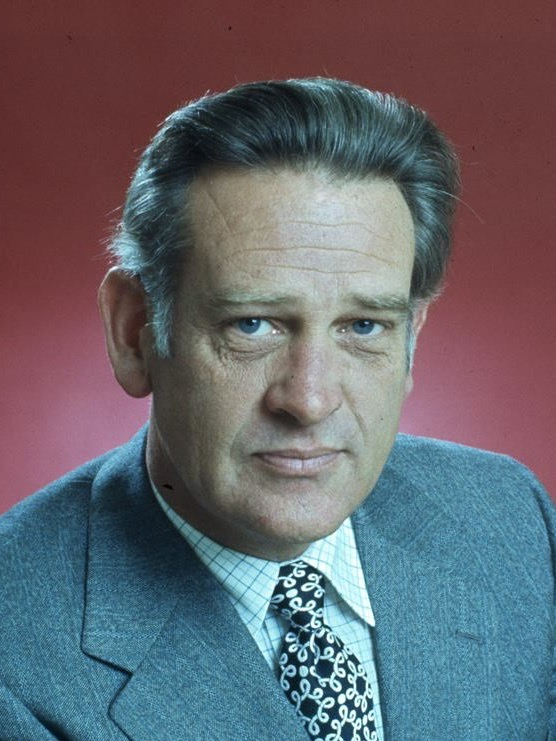

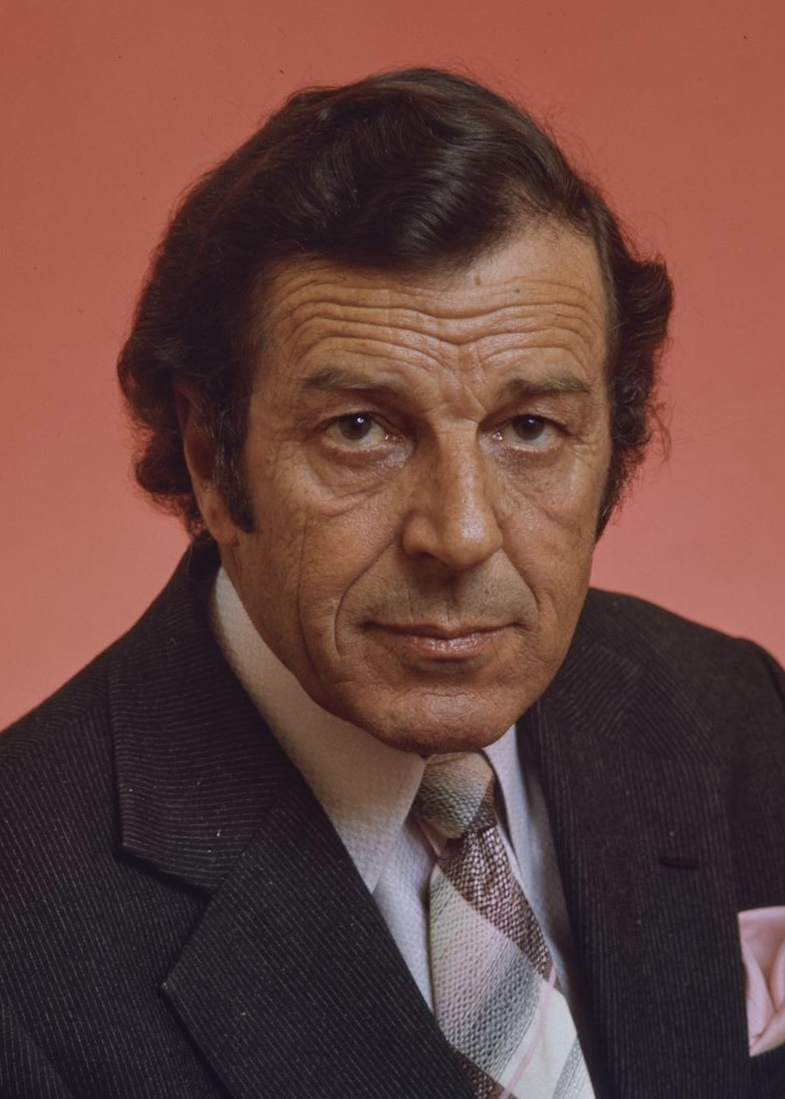
	First party	Second party	Third party
Leader	Reg Withers	Ken Wriedt	Don Chipp
Party	Liberal/National coalition	Labor	Democrats
Leader since	20 December 1972	10 February 1975	9 May 1977
Leader's seat	Western Australia	Tasmania	Victoria
Seats before	35	27	None (New)
Seats after	34	27	2
Seat change	▼1	Steady	▲2
Popular vote	3,369,843	2,718,876	823,550
Percentage	45.56%	36.76%	11.13%
Swing	▼5.18%	▼4.15%	▲11.13%
- Senators elected in the 1977 federal election
Leader of the Senate before election
Reg Withers
Liberal/National coalition
Elected Leader of the Senate
Reg Withers
Liberal/National coalition

The following tables show state-by-state results in the Australian Senate at the 1977 federal election. Senators total 34 coalition (27 Liberal, six coalition National, one CLP), 27 Labor, two Democrats and one Independent. Senator terms are six years (three for territories). Senators elected at this election began their terms on 1 July 1978, except for the territorial senators who took their seats at the election. This election marked the effective parliamentary debut of the Australian Democrats.

== Australia ==
Senate (STV) — 1977–80—Turnout 95.08% (CV) — Informal 9.00%
Party	Votes	%	Swing	Seats won	Seats held	Change
Liberal–NCP Coalition (total)	3,369,843	45.56	–5.18	18	34	–1
Liberal–NCP joint ticket	2,533,882	34.26	−5.60	7	*	*
Liberal	783,878	10.60	−0.48	10	27	+1
National Country	36,619	0.50	−0.04	0	6	–2
Country Liberal	15,463	0.21	−0.01	1	1	0
Labor	2,718,876	36.76	−4.15	14	27	0
Democrats	823,550	11.13	+11.13	2	2	+2
Democratic Labor	123,192	1.67	–1.00	0	0	0
Progress	88,203	1.19	+0.32	0	0	0
Call to Australia	49,395	1.12	+1.12	0	0	0
Marijuana	44,276	0.60	+0.60	0	0	0
Socialist	42,740	0.58	+0.57	0	0	0
Australia	8,283	0.11	–0.37	0	0	0
Independents	127,850	1.73	+0.13	0	1	0
Total	7,396,207			34	64	

- Independent: Brian Harradine (Tasmania)
- The Progress Party was the renamed "Workers Party" from the 1975 election.

== New South Wales ==
Elected	#	Senator	Party
1978
1978	1	Peter Baume	Liberal
1978	2	Tony Mulvihill	Labor
1978	3	Misha Lajovic	Liberal
1978	4	Arthur Gietzelt	Labor
1978	5	Colin Mason	Democrat
1976
1976	1	Bob Cotton	Liberal
1976	2	Doug McClelland	Labor
1976	3	John Carrick	Liberal
1976	4	Jim McClelland	Labor
1976	5	Douglas Scott	NCP

1977 Australian federal election: Senate, New South Wales
Party	Candidate	Votes	%	±%
Quota		436,875		
Coalition	1. Peter Baume (Lib) (elected 1); 2. Misha Lajovic (Lib) (elected 3); 3. Dorothy Ross (NCP)	1,136,215	43.3	−6.1
Labor	1. Tony Mulvihill (elected 2); 2. Arthur Gietzelt (elected 4); 3. Kerry Sibraa	1,050,672	40.1	−4.0
Democrats	1. Colin Mason (elected 5); 2. Paul McLean; 3. Malcolm Hilbery; 4. Ronald Mallett; 5. Patricia Clark	218,364	8.3	+8.3
Progress	1. Barry Bracken; 2. Robert Howard; 3. Robert Schollbach	64,557	2.5	+1.4
Group G	1. Bill Wentworth; 2. Leah Young	55,230	2.1	+2.1
Call to Australia	1. Fred Nile; 2. Reuben Scarf; 3. Patricia Judge	49,395	1.8	+1.8
Marijuana	1. James Billington; 2. Diana Fuller; 3. Peter Livesey	22,879	0.9	+0.9
Group E	1. Shirley Smith; 2. Bruce Miles; 3. Cecil Patten; 4. Christos Roumeliotis	7,235	0.3	+0.3
Socialist	1. Edgar Woodbury; 2. Pat Clancy	5,437	0.2	+0.2
Australia	1. John Notary; 2. Clifford Willard; 3. Allan Jones	4,454	0.2	−0.2
Group C	1. Allan Chan; 2. Chan Chung Ling	3,632	0.2	+0.2
Independent	John Esposito	2,737	0.1	+0.1
Independent	Henry Harding	442	0.0	0.0
Total formal votes		2,621,249	90.4	+0.1
Informal votes		278,196	9.6	−0.1
Turnout		2,899,445	95.0	−0.4

== Victoria ==
Elected	#	Senator	Party
1978
1978	1	Alan Missen	Liberal
1978	2	Gareth Evans	Labor
1978	3	David Hamer	Liberal
1978	4	John Button	Labor
1978	5	Don Chipp	Democrat
1976
1976	1	Ivor Greenwood	Liberal
1976	2	Jean Melzer	Labor
1976	3	Margaret Guilfoyle	Liberal
1976	4	Cyril Primmer	Labor
1976	5	James Webster	NCP

1977 Australian federal election: Senate, Victoria
Party	Candidate	Votes	%	±%
Quota		331,739		
Coalition	1. Alan Missen (Lib) (elected 1); 2. David Hamer (Lib) (elected 3); 3. Tom Tehan (NCP)	833,477	41.9	−8.6
Labor	1. Gareth Evans (elected 2); 2. John Button (elected 4); 3. Bill Brown	680,673	34.2	−7.1
Democrats	1. Don Chipp (elected 5); 2. John Siddons; 3. Janice Bateman; 4. Harold Jeffrey; 5. Neil Sleep	322,493	16.2	+16.2
Democratic Labour	1. Jim Brosnan; 2. Les Hilton; 3. Paul McManus	123,192	6.2	+0.3
Marijuana	1. Jay McRoach; 2. Peter McKenzie	14,773	0.7	+0.7
Group B	1. Carolyn Ingvarson; 2. Elizabeth Morton; 3. Marie Quinn	4,286	0.2	+0.2
Independent	Terence Vine	4,023	0.2	+0.2
Socialist	1. Ron Hearn; 2. Trevor McCandless; 3. Hariklia Kokkinos	3,593	0.2	+0.2
Independent	Shane Watson	1,355	0.1	+0.1
Australia	1. Derek Kruse; 2. David Heath; 3. Gail Farrell	1,351	0.1	−0.9
Independent	Ronald Batey	729	0.0	0.0
Independent	Peter Kavanagh	491	0.0	0.0
Total formal votes		1,990,436	90.9	−1.0
Informal votes		199,471	9.1	+1.0
Turnout		2,189,907	95.6	−0.1

== Queensland ==
Elected	#	Senator	Party
1978
1978	1	Kathy Sullivan	Liberal
1978	2	George Georges	Labor
1978	3	Stan Collard	NCP
1978	4	Mal Colston	Labor
1978	5	David MacGibbon	Liberal
1976
1976	1	Neville Bonner	Liberal
1976	2	Jim Keeffe	Labor
1976	3	Ron Maunsell	NCP
1976	4	Ron McAuliffe	Labor
1976	5	Glen Sheil	NCP

1977 Australian federal election: Senate: Queensland
Party	Candidate	Votes	%	±%
Quota		183,145		
Coalition	1. Kathy Sullivan (Lib) (elected 1); 2. Stan Collard (NCP) (elected 3); 3. David MacGibbon (Lib) (elected 5)	564,190	51.3	−6.0
Labor	1. George Georges (elected 2); 2. Mal Colston (elected 4); 3. Verona Wake	380,418	34.6	−2.2
Democrats	1. Paul Griffin; 2. Michael Macklin; 3. Maureen Burton	98,165	8.9	+8.9
Socialist	1. Charles Murphy; 2. David Ryan; 3. Ivan Ivanoff	31,826	2.9	+2.9
Progress	1. Vivian Forbes; 2. Owen Pershouse; 3. Suzanne Ham; 4. Barrie Fulcher	8,376	0.8	−1.2
Group C	1. Anne Glew; 2. Geoffrey Crouch	6,674	0.6	+0.6
Group D	1. James Drabsch; 2. Lloyd Drabsch; 3. Ace Drabsch	4,333	0.4	+0.4
Independent	John Jones	3,730	0.3	+0.3
Independent	Bruce Chambers	1,160	0.1	+0.1
Total formal votes		1,098,872	92.0	+0.3
Informal votes		95,003	8.0	−0.3
Turnout		1,193,875	94.8	−0.4

== South Australia ==
Elected	#	Senator	Party
1978
1978	1	Tony Messner	Liberal
1978	2	Geoff McLaren	Labor
1978	3	Harold Young	Liberal
1978	4	Ron Elstob	Labor
1978	5	Baden Teague	Liberal
1976
1976	1	Gordon Davidson	Liberal
1976	2	Reg Bishop	Labor
1976	3	Don Jessop	Liberal
1976	4	Jim Cavanagh	Labor
1976	5	Condor Laucke	Liberal

1977 Australian federal election, Senate, South Australia
Party	Candidate	Votes	%	±%
Quota		117,036		
Liberal	1. Tony Messner (elected 1); 2. Harold Young (elected 3); 3. Baden Teague (elected 5)	344,351	49.0	−2.4
Labor	1. Geoff McLaren (elected 2); 2. Ron Elstob (elected 4); 3. Nick Bolkus	258,643	36.8	−3.8
Democrats	1. Ian Gilfillan; 2. Michael Lee; 3. Nicholas Theologou	78,496	11.2	+11.2
Group F	1. George Jukes; 2. Jean Jukes	5,255	0.8	+0.8
Marijuana	Stephen Dimitriou	4,331	0.6	+0.6
Independent	Andrew Jones	3,747	0.5	+0.5
Progress	1. John Whiting; 2. Verna Oakley	3,033	0.4	−0.2
Australia	1. Colyn van Reenen; 2. Kathy Dancer	2,478	0.4	+0.4
Socialist	1. Alan Miller; 2. Muriel Goss	1,884	0.3	+0.2
Total formal votes		702,218	89.6	−0.5
Informal votes		81,451	10.4	+0.5
Turnout		783,669	95.1	−1.1

== Western Australia ==
Elected	#	Senator	Party
1978
1978	1	Fred Chaney	Liberal
1978	2	Peter Walsh	Labor
1978	3	Andrew Thomas	Liberal
1978	4	Ruth Coleman	Labor
1978	5	Allan Rocher	Liberal
1976
1976	1	Reg Withers	Liberal
1976	2	John Wheeldon	Labor
1976	3	Peter Durack	Liberal
1976	4	Gordon McIntosh	Labor
1976	5	Peter Sim	Liberal

1977 Australian federal election: Senate, Western Australia
Party	Candidate	Votes	%	±%
Quota		100,026		
Liberal	1. Fred Chaney (elected 1); 2. Andrew Thomas (elected 3); 3. Allan Rocher (elected 5)	278,413	46.4	−5.3
Labor	1. Peter Walsh (elected 2); 2. Ruth Coleman (elected 4); 3. Howard Olney	196,781	32.8	−3.7
Democrats	1. Jack Evans; 2. Uri Themal; 3. Shirley de la Hunty	74,912	12.5	+12.5
National Country	1. Donald Eckersley; 2. Donald Thomas; 3. Moira Jones	36,619	6.1	−0.8
Progress	1. Peter Richardson; 2. Robert Scott; 3. Janet Beeck	10,412	1.7	+0.5
Independent	John Cowley	1,078	0.2	+0.2
Group E	1. Francesco Nesci; 2. Nellie Stuart	1,014	0.2	+0.2
Independent	Geoffrey Gray	929	0.2	+0.2
Total formal votes		600,158	91.8	+2.6
Informal votes		53,426	8.2	−2.6
Turnout		653,584	94.6	−0.1

== Tasmania ==
Elected	#	Senator	Party
1978
1978	1	Shirley Walters	Liberal
1978	2	Don Grimes	Labor
1978	3	Brian Archer	Liberal
1978	4	Michael Tate	Labor
1978	5	John Watson	Liberal
1976
1976	1	Peter Rae	Liberal
1976	2	Ken Wriedt	Labor
1976	3	Brian Harradine	Independent
1976	4	Michael Townley	Liberal
1976	5	Justin O'Byrne	Labor

1977 Australian federal election: Senate, Tasmania
Party	Candidate	Votes	%	±%
Quota		39,238		
Liberal	1. Shirley Walters (elected 1); 2. Brian Archer (elected 3); 3. John Watson (elected 5)	117,217	49.8	+0.8
Labor	1. Don Grimes (elected 2); 2. Michael Tate (elected 4); 3. John White	88,722	37.7	+2.5
Group C	1. Rudge Townley; 2. Ann Waterhouse	15,695	6.7	+6.7
Democrats	1. Norman Siberry; 2. Liz Holloway	13,793	5.9	+5.9
Total formal votes		235,427	92.9	+2.8
Informal votes		17,971	7.1	−2.8
Turnout		253,398	96.7	+0.1

== Australian Capital Territory ==
Elected	#	Senator	Party
1977
1977	1	Susan Ryan	Labor
1977	2	John Knight	Liberal

1977 Australian federal election: Senate, Australian Capital Territory
Party	Candidate	Votes	%	±%
Quota		38,067		
Labor	1. Susan Ryan (elected 1); 2. Robert Smith	49,374	43.2	+6.2
Liberal	2. John Knight (elected 2); 2. Stanley Sparrow	43,897	38.4	−5.2
Democrats	Donald Evans	14,561	12.8	+12.8
Group A	1. Anthony O'Dea; 2. Noel McCann	4,075	3.6	+3.6
Marijuana	Gerhard Zatschler	2,293	2.0	+2.0
Total formal votes		114,200	96.9	+0.6
Informal votes		3,702	3.1	−0.6
Turnout		117,902	92.6	−1.5

== Northern Territory ==
Elected	#	Senator	Party
1977
1977	1	Bernie Kilgariff	Country Liberal
1977	2	Ted Robertson	Labor

1977 Australian federal election: Senate, Northern Territory
Party	Candidate	Votes	%	±%
Quota		11,216		
Country Liberal	1. Bernard Kilgariff (elected 1); 2. Barry Wyatt	15,463	46.0	−8.6
Labor	1. Ted Robertson (elected 2); 2. Harry Maschke	13,593	40.4	+4.5
Democrats	1. Dennis Booth; 2. Peter Dean	2,766	8.2	+8.2
Progress	1. Kenneth Kitto; 2. David Cooper	1,825	5.4	+3.2
Total formal votes		33,647	93.5	+0.7
Informal votes		2,335	6.5	−0.7
Turnout		35,982	81.2	+6.3

== See also ==
- 1977 Australian federal election
- Candidates of the Australian federal election, 1977
- Members of the Australian Senate, 1978–1981
