= Members of the Australian Senate, 1975–1978 =

Senate composition at 17 February 1976
Government (35) - (2 seat majority)
Liberal (26)
Country Party (8)
Country Liberal (1)

Opposition (27)
Labor (27)

Crossbench (2)
Liberal Movement (1) (Note: Steele Hall joined the Liberal party in 1976 on the break-up of the Liberal Movement. Hall resigned from the Senate in 1977 and Janine Haines, who had joined the Democrats on the break-up of the Liberal Movement, was appointed to fill the vacancy on 14 December.)
Independent (Harradine) (1)

Changes in composition

This is a list of members of the Australian Senate from 1975 to 1978. The 13 December 1975 election was a double dissolution of both houses, with all 127 seats in the House of Representatives, and all 64 seats in the Senate up for election. Malcolm Fraser had been commissioned as prime minister following the dismissal of Gough Whitlam's Labor government by Governor-General Sir John Kerr, on 11 November 1975. The same day, Fraser advised the calling of the election, in accordance with Kerr's stipulated conditions. Thus the Liberal Party of Australia, led by Fraser, with Coalition partner the National Country Party, led by Doug Anthony, went to the election as a caretaker government. The election resulted in the Coalition securing government with a 30-seat swing away from Labor in the House of Representatives.

In accordance with section 13 of the Constitution, following a double dissolution of Parliament, the terms for state senators commence on 1 July preceding the election, i.e., on 1 July 1975. The first five senators elected in each State were allocated full six-year terms ending on 30 June 1981 while the other half were allocated three-year terms ending on 30 June 1978.

There were two significant changes that affected the composition of the Senate.

- The Northern Territory and Australian Capital Territory were to be represented in the Senate for the first time. The terms of senators representing the territories commenced on the date of the election and ended at the dissolution of the House of Representatives, in this case the December 1977 election.
- A person appointed to a casual vacancy must be from the same political party as the original senator and is appointed until the end of the original term.

Austin Lewis had been appointed under the former system, however his term was extended to the end of the original term of 30 June 1981 as a result of the 1977 referendum. The first vacancy occurring under the new process was caused by the resignation of Steele Hall, who had been a member of the Liberal Movement but had joined the Liberal party in 1976 on the break-up of the Liberal Movement. Janine Haines was appointed to replace Hall, having been third on the Liberal Movement ticket in 1975, however she was no longer a member of the Liberal Movement, having joined the Democrats.

Senator	Party	State	Term ending	Years in office
Brian Archer	Liberal	Tasmania	1978	1975–1994
Peter Baume	Liberal	New South Wales	1978	1974–1991
Reg Bishop	Labor	South Australia	1981	1961–1981
Neville Bonner	Liberal	Queensland	1981	1971–1983
Bill Brown	Labor	Victoria	1978	1969–1970, 1971–1978
John Button	Labor	Victoria	1978	1974–1993
Don Cameron	Labor	South Australia	1978	1969–1978
John Carrick	Liberal	New South Wales	1981	1970–1987
Jim Cavanagh	Labor	South Australia	1981	1961–1981
Fred Chaney	Liberal	Western Australia	1978	1974–1990
Ruth Coleman	Labor	Western Australia	1978	1974–1987
Stan Collard	National Country	Queensland	1978	1975–1987
Mal Colston	Labor	Queensland	1978	1975–1999
Sir Magnus Cormack	Liberal	Victoria	1978	1951–1953, 1962–1978
Bob Cotton	Liberal	New South Wales	1981	1965–1978
Gordon Davidson	Liberal	South Australia	1981	1961, 1962, 1965–1981
Don Devitt	Labor	Tasmania	1978	1965–1978
Tom Drake-Brockman	National Country	Western Australia	1978	1958, 1959–1978
Peter Durack	Liberal	Western Australia	1981	1970–1993
George Georges	Labor	Queensland	1978	1967–1987
Arthur Gietzelt	Labor	New South Wales	1978	1970–1989
Ivor Greenwood (Note: Liberal Ivor Greenwood died on 13 October 1976; Liberal Austin Lewis was appointed to fill the ensuing vacancy on 17 December. Lewis's term would have ended in December 1977, being the earlier of the next election for the House of Representatives or the Senate, however his term was extended to the end of Greenwood's original term on 30 June 1981 as a result of the 1977 referendum.)	Liberal	Victoria	1981	1968–1976
Don Grimes	Labor	Tasmania	1978	1974–1987
Margaret Guilfoyle	Liberal	Victoria	1981	1970–1987
Janine Haines (Note: Senator Steele Hall had been elected as a member of the Liberal Movement, however the party broke up and he joined the Liberal party in June 1976. Hall resigned from the Senate on 16 November 1977 to contest the House of Representatives seat of Hawker. Democrats Janine Haines was appointed to fill the ensuing vacancy on 14 December.)	Democrats	South Australia	1978	1977–1978, 1980–1990
Steele Hall	Liberal Movement/Liberal	South Australia	1978	1974–1977
Brian Harradine	Independent	Tasmania	1981	1975–2005
Don Jessop	Liberal	South Australia	1981	1970–1991
Jim Keeffe	Labor	Queensland	1981	1964–1983
Bernie Kilgariff	Country Liberal	Northern Territory	1977, 1980 (Note: The term of a territory senator ends at the dissolution of the House of Representatives which was December 1977.)	1975–1987
John Knight	Liberal	Australian Capital Territory	1977, 1980	1975–1981
Misha Lajovic	Liberal	New South Wales	1978	1975–1985
Sir Condor Laucke	Liberal	South Australia	1981	1967–1981
Austin Lewis	Liberal	Victoria	1977, 1981	1976–1993
Kathy Martin	Liberal	Queensland	1978	1974–1984
Ron Maunsell	National Country	Queensland	1981	1967–1981
Ron McAuliffe	Labor	Queensland	1981	1970–1981
Doug McClelland	Labor	New South Wales	1981	1961–1987
Jim McClelland	Labor	New South Wales	1981	1970–1978
Gordon McIntosh	Labor	Western Australia	1981	1974–1987
Geoff McLaren	Labor	South Australia	1978	1970–1983
Jean Melzer	Labor	Victoria	1981	1974–1981
Tony Messner	Liberal	South Australia	1978	1975–1990
Alan Missen	Liberal	Victoria	1978	1974–1986
Tony Mulvihill	Labor	New South Wales	1978	1964–1983
Justin O'Byrne (Note: Father of the Senate)	Labor	Tasmania	1981	1947–1981
Cyril Primmer	Labor	Victoria	1981	1971–1985
Peter Rae	Liberal	Tasmania	1981	1967–1986
Ted Robertson	Labor	Northern Territory	1977, 1980	1975–1987
Susan Ryan	Labor	Australian Capital Territory	1977, 1980	1975–1988
Douglas Scott	National Country	New South Wales	1981	1970, 1974–1985
Glen Sheil	National Country	Queensland	1981	1974–1981
Kerry Sibraa	Labor	New South Wales	1978	1975–1978, 1978–1994
Peter Sim	Liberal	Western Australia	1981	1964–1981
Tom Tehan	National Country	Victoria	1978	1975–1978
Andrew Thomas	Liberal	Western Australia	1978	1975–1983
Michael Townley	Liberal	Tasmania	1981	1970–1987
Peter Walsh	Labor	Western Australia	1978	1974–1993
Shirley Walters	Liberal	Tasmania	1978	1975–1993
James Webster	National Country	Victoria	1981	1964–1981
John Wheeldon	Labor	Western Australia	1981	1964–1981
Rt Reg Withers	Liberal	Western Australia	1981	1966, 1967–1987
Ian Wood	Liberal	Queensland	1978	1950–1978
Ken Wriedt	Labor	Tasmania	1981	1964–1980
Reg Wright	Liberal	Tasmania	1978	1950–1978
Harold Young	Liberal	South Australia	1978	1968–1981
