= Members of the Australian Senate, 1981–1983 =

Senate composition at 1 July 1981
Government (31) - (2 seat minority)
Coalition
Liberal (27)
National Country Party (3)
Country Liberal (1)

Opposition (27)
Labor (27)

Crossbench (6)
Democrats (5)
Independent (Brian Harradine) (1)

This is a list of members of the Australian Senate from 1 July 1981 to 5 February 1983. Half of the state senators were elected at the December 1977 election and had terms due to finish on 30 June 1984; the other half of the state senators were elected at the October 1980 election and had terms due to finish on 30 June 1987. The territory senators were elected at the October 1980 election and their terms ended at the dissolution of the House of Representatives, which was March 1983. However, in fact, the Senate was dissolved on 4 February 1983 for a double dissolution election.

Senator	Party	State	Term ending	Years in office
Brian Archer	Liberal	Tasmania	1984	1975–1994
Peter Baume	Liberal	New South Wales	1984	1974–1991
Florence Bjelke-Petersen	National (Note: The National Country Party changed its name to the National Party of Australia during 1982.)	Queensland	1987	1981–1993
Nick Bolkus	Labor	South Australia	1987	1981–2005
Neville Bonner	Liberal	Queensland	1987	1971–1983
John Button	Labor	Victoria	1984	1974–1993
John Carrick	Liberal	New South Wales	1987	1970–1987
Fred Chaney	Liberal	Western Australia	1984	1974–1990
Bruce Childs	Labor	New South Wales	1987	1981–1997
Don Chipp	Democrats	Victoria	1984	1977–1986
John Coates	Labor	Tasmania	1987	1981–1996
Ruth Coleman	Labor	Western Australia	1984	1974–1987
Stan Collard	National	Queensland	1984	1975–1987
Mal Colston	Labor	Queensland	1984	1975–1999
Noel Crichton-Browne	Liberal	Western Australia	1987	1981–1996
Peter Durack	Liberal	Western Australia	1987	1970–1993
Ron Elstob	Labor	South Australia	1984	1977–1987
Gareth Evans	Labor	Victoria	1984	1977–1996
Dominic Foreman	Labor	South Australia	1987	1981–1997
George Georges	Labor	Queensland	1984	1967–1987
Arthur Gietzelt	Labor	New South Wales	1984	1970–1989
Patricia Giles	Labor	Western Australia	1987	1981–1993
Don Grimes	Labor	Tasmania	1984	1974–1987
Dame Margaret Guilfoyle	Liberal	Victoria	1987	1970–1987
Janine Haines	Democrats	South Australia	1987	1977–1978, 1980–1990
David Hamer	Liberal	Victoria	1984	1977–1990
Brian Harradine	Independent	Tasmania	1987	1975–2005
Jean Hearn	Labor	Tasmania	1987	1981–1985
Robert Hill	Liberal	South Australia	1987	1981–2006
Don Jessop	Liberal	South Australia	1987	1970–1991
Gerry Jones	Labor	Queensland	1987	1981–1996
Jim Keeffe	Labor	Queensland	1987	1964–1983
Bernie Kilgariff	Country Liberal	Northern Territory	1983 (Note: The term of a territory senator ends at the dissolution of the House of Representatives, which was March 1983.)	1975–1987
Misha Lajovic	Liberal	New South Wales	1984	1975–1985
Austin Lewis	Liberal	Victoria	1987	1976–1993
David MacGibbon	Liberal	Queensland	1984	1977–1999
Michael Macklin	Democrats	Queensland	1987	1981–1990
Kathy Martin	Liberal	Queensland	1984	1974–1984
John Martyr	Liberal	Western Australia	1984	1981–1983
Colin Mason	Democrats	New South Wales	1984	1977–1987
Doug McClelland (Note: Father of the Senate)	Labor	New South Wales	1987	1961–1987
Gordon McIntosh	Labor	Western Australia	1987	1974–1987
Geoff McLaren	Labor	South Australia	1984	1970–1983
Tony Messner	Liberal	South Australia	1984	1975–1990
Alan Missen	Liberal	Victoria	1984	1974–1986
Tony Mulvihill	Labor	New South Wales	1984	1964–1983
Cyril Primmer	Labor	Victoria	1987	1971–1985
Peter Rae	Liberal	Tasmania	1987	1967–1986
Robert Ray	Labor	Victoria	1987	1981–2008
Margaret Reid	Liberal	Australian Capital Territory	1983	1981–2003
Ted Robertson	Labor	Northern Territory	1983	1975–1987
Susan Ryan	Labor	Australian Capital Territory	1983	1975–1988
Douglas Scott	National	New South Wales	1987	1970, 1974–1985
Kerry Sibraa	Labor	New South Wales	1987	1975–78, 1978–94
John Siddons	Democrats	Victoria	1987	1981–1983, 1985–1987
Michael Tate	Labor	Tasmania	1984	1977–1993
Baden Teague	Liberal	South Australia	1984	1977–1996
Andrew Thomas	Liberal	Western Australia	1984	1975–1983
Michael Townley	Liberal	Tasmania	1987	1970–1987
Peter Walsh	Labor	Western Australia	1984	1974–1993
Shirley Walters	Liberal	Tasmania	1984	1975–1993
John Watson	Liberal	Tasmania	1984	1978–2008
Rt. Reg Withers	Liberal	Western Australia	1987	1966, 1967–1987
Harold Young	Liberal	South Australia	1984	1967–1983
