= Members of the Australian Senate, 1978–1981 =

Senate composition at 1 July 1978
Government (34) – (1 seat majority)
Coalition
Liberal (27)
Country Party (6)
Country Liberal (1)

Opposition (27)
Labor (27)

Crossbench (3)
Democrats (2)
Independent (1)

This is a list of members of the Australian Senate from 1 July 1978 to 30 June 1981. Half of the state senators were elected at the December 1975 election and had terms due to finish on 30 June 1981; the other half of the state senators were elected at the December 1977 election and had terms due to finish on 30 June 1984. The territory senators were elected at the December 1977 election and their terms ended at the dissolution of the House of Representatives, which was October 1980.

Senator	Party	State	Term ending	Years in office
Brian Archer	Liberal	Tasmania	1984	1975–1994
Peter Baume	Liberal	New South Wales	1984	1974–1991
Reg Bishop	Labor	South Australia	1981	1961–1981
Florence Bjelke-Petersen (Note: Queensland NCP Senator Glen Sheil resigned in early 1981. Florence Bjelke-Petersen was appointed as his replacement on 12 March for a term ending 30 June 1981.)	National Country	Queensland	1981	1981–1993
Neville Bonner	Liberal	Queensland	1981	1971–1983
John Button	Labor	Victoria	1984	1974–1993
John Carrick	Liberal	New South Wales	1981	1970–1987
Jim Cavanagh	Labor	South Australia	1981	1961–1981
Fred Chaney	Liberal	Western Australia	1984	1974–1990
Don Chipp	Democrats	Victoria	1984	1977–1986
Ruth Coleman	Labor	Western Australia	1984	1974–1987
Stan Collard	National Country	Queensland	1984	1975–1987
Mal Colston	Labor	Queensland	1984	1975–1999
Bob Cotton (Note: New South Wales Liberal Senator Bob Cotton resigned on 13 July 1978. Chris Puplick was appointed as his replacement on 26 July for a term ending 30 June 1981.)	Liberal	New South Wales	1981	1965–1978
Gordon Davidson	Liberal	South Australia	1981	1961, 1962, 1965–1981
Peter Durack	Liberal	Western Australia	1981	1970–1993
Ron Elstob	Labor	South Australia	1984	1978–1987
Gareth Evans	Labor	Victoria	1984	1977–1996
George Georges	Labor	Queensland	1984	1967–1987
Arthur Gietzelt	Labor	New South Wales	1984	1970–1989
Don Grimes	Labor	Tasmania	1984	1974–1987
Margaret Guilfoyle	Liberal	Victoria	1981	1970–1987
David Hamer	Liberal	Victoria	1984	1978–1990
Brian Harradine	Independent	Tasmania	1981	1975–2005
Jean Hearn (Note: Tasmanian Labor Senator Ken Wriedt resigned on 25 September 1980 in order to contest the Australian House of Representatives seat of Denison at the 1980 election. Jean Hearn was appointed as his replacement on 15 October for a term ending 30 June 1981.)	Labor	Tasmania	1981	1980–1985
Don Jessop	Liberal	South Australia	1981	1970–1991
Jim Keeffe	Labor	Queensland	1981	1964–1983
Bernie Kilgariff	Country Liberal	Northern Territory	1980, 1983 (Note: The term of a territory senator ends at the dissolution of the House of Representatives, which was October 1980.)	1975–1987
John Knight (Note: Australian Capital Territory Liberal Senator John Knight died on 4 March 1981. Margaret Reid was appointed as his replacement on 5 May for a term ending at the October 1980 election.)	Liberal	Australian Capital Territory	1980	1975–1981
Misha Lajovic	Liberal	New South Wales	1984	1975–1985
Sir Condor Laucke	Liberal	South Australia	1981	1967–1981
Austin Lewis	Liberal	Victoria	1981	1976–1993
David MacGibbon	Liberal	Queensland	1984	1978–1999
Kathy Martin	Liberal	Queensland	1984	1974–1984
John Martyr (Note: Western Australian Liberal Senator Allan Rocher resigned in early 1981 to contest the 1981 Curtin by-election. John Martyr was appointed as his replacement on 11 March for a term ending 30 June 1984.)	Liberal	Western Australia	1984	1981–1983
Colin Mason	Democrats	New South Wales	1984	1978–1987
Ron Maunsell	National Country	Queensland	1981	1967–1981
Ron McAuliffe	Labor	Queensland	1981	1970–1981
Doug McClelland	Labor	New South Wales	1981	1961–1987
Jim McClelland (Note: New South Wales Labor Senator Jim McClelland resigned on 21 July 1978. Kerry Sibraa was appointed as his replacement on 9 August for a term ending 30 June 1981.)	Labor	New South Wales	1981	1970–1978
Gordon McIntosh	Labor	Western Australia	1981	1974–1987
Geoff McLaren	Labor	South Australia	1984	1970–1983
Jean Melzer	Labor	Victoria	1981	1974–1981
Tony Messner	Liberal	South Australia	1984	1975–1990
Alan Missen	Liberal	Victoria	1984	1974–1986
Tony Mulvihill	Labor	New South Wales	1984	1964–1983
Laurence Neal (Note: Victorian National Party Senator James Webster resigned on 21 January 1980. Laurence Neal was appointed as his replacement on 11 March for a term ending 30 June 1981.)	National Country	Victoria	1981	1980–1981
Justin O'Byrne (Note: Father of the Senate)	Labor	Tasmania	1981	1947–1981
Cyril Primmer	Labor	Victoria	1981	1971–1985
Chris Puplick	Liberal	New South Wales	1981	1978–1981, 1984–1990
Peter Rae	Liberal	Tasmania	1981	1967–1986
Margaret Reid	Liberal	Australian Capital Territory	1980, 1983	1981–2003
Ted Robertson	Labor	Northern Territory	1980, 1983	1975–1987
Allan Rocher	Liberal	Western Australia	1984	1978–1981
Susan Ryan	Labor	Australian Capital Territory	1980, 1983	1975–1988
Douglas Scott	National Country	New South Wales	1981	1970, 1974–1985
Glen Sheil	National Country	Queensland	1981	1974–1981
Kerry Sibraa	Labor	New South Wales	1981	1975–1978, 1978–1994
Peter Sim	Liberal	Western Australia	1981	1964–1981
Michael Tate	Labor	Tasmania	1984	1977–1993
Baden Teague	Liberal	South Australia	1984	1977–1996
Andrew Thomas	Liberal	Western Australia	1984	1975–1983
Michael Townley	Liberal	Tasmania	1981	1970–1987
Peter Walsh	Labor	Western Australia	1984	1974–1993
Shirley Walters	Liberal	Tasmania	1984	1975–1993
John Watson	Liberal	Tasmania	1984	1978–2008
James Webster	National Country	Victoria	1981	1964–1980
John Wheeldon	Labor	Western Australia	1981	1964–1981
Rt. Reg Withers	Liberal	Western Australia	1981	1966, 1967–1987
Ken Wriedt	Labor	Tasmania	1981	1964–1980
Harold Young	Liberal	South Australia	1984	1968–1981
