= List of senators from the Australian Capital Territory =

Australian Capital Territory Australian Senate
- Created: 1975
- Party: Labor (1); Independent (1)

This is a list of senators from the Australian Capital Territory since the territories were first allowed to elect senators in 1975. The residents of the Jervis Bay Territory and Norfolk Island vote for and are represented by ACT Senators.

== List ==
Parties	Number of elected Senators by party
Labor Party	5
Liberal	4
Independent	1

Election	Senator (Party)	Senator (Party)
1975	Susan Ryan (Labor)	John Knight (Liberal)
1977	Susan Ryan (Labor)	John Knight (Liberal)
1980	Susan Ryan (Labor)	John Knight (Liberal)
1981	Susan Ryan (Labor)	Margaret Reid (Liberal)
1983	Susan Ryan (Labor)	Margaret Reid (Liberal)
1984	Susan Ryan (Labor)	Margaret Reid (Liberal)
1987	Susan Ryan (Labor)	Margaret Reid (Liberal)
1988	Bob McMullan (Labor)	Margaret Reid (Liberal)
1990	Bob McMullan (Labor)	Margaret Reid (Liberal)
1993	Bob McMullan (Labor)	Margaret Reid (Liberal)
1996	Kate Lundy (Labor)	Margaret Reid (Liberal)
1998	Kate Lundy (Labor)	Margaret Reid (Liberal)
2001	Kate Lundy (Labor)	Margaret Reid (Liberal)
2003	Kate Lundy (Labor)	Gary Humphries (Liberal)
2004	Kate Lundy (Labor)	Gary Humphries (Liberal)
2007	Kate Lundy (Labor)	Gary Humphries (Liberal)
2010	Kate Lundy (Labor)	Gary Humphries (Liberal)
2013	Kate Lundy (Labor)	Zed Seselja (Liberal)
2015	Katy Gallagher (Labor)	Zed Seselja (Liberal)
2016	Katy Gallagher (Labor)	Zed Seselja (Liberal)
2018	David Smith (Labor)	Zed Seselja (Liberal)
2019	Katy Gallagher (Labor)	Zed Seselja (Liberal)
2022	Katy Gallagher (Labor)	David Pocock (Independent)
2025	Katy Gallagher (Labor)	David Pocock (Independent)

== See also ==
- Electoral results for the Australian Senate in the Australian Capital Territory
