= Lajovic =

Lajovic is a Slovene surname and Lajović (Serbian Cyrillic: Лајовић) is a Serbian surname. Notable people with the surname include:

- Anton Lajovic (1878–1960), Slovenian composer
- Dušan Lajović (born 1990), Serbian tennis player
- Misha Lajovic (1921–2008), Australian politician
- Uroš Lajovic (born 1944), Slovenian conductor and professor
