= Dorothy Ross =

Dorothy Ross may refer to:

- Dorothy Ross (activist) (1928–1998), Australian women's and rural activist
- Dorothy Ross (historian) (1936–2024), American historian of social sciences
- Dorothy Jean Ross (1926–2006), given name of one of the Ross Sisters, a trio of American singers and dancers
