= Janine Haines =

Australian politician

The Honourable Janine Haines AM
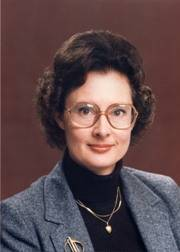

Deputy Chancellor of the University of Adelaide
- In office 1997 – March 1999 Serving with Senior Deputy Chancellor; Jim Bettison
- Chancellor: Bill Scammell; Bruce Webb
- Preceded by: Mervyn Smith; Harry Medlin
- Succeeded by: Brian Croser

2nd Leader of the Australian Democrats
- In office 18 August 1986 – 24 March 1990
- Deputy: Michael Macklin
- Preceded by: Don Chipp
- Succeeded by: Michael Macklin

2nd Deputy Leader of the Australian Democrats
- In office 20 August 1985 – 18 August 1986
- Leader: Don Chipp
- Preceded by: Colin Mason
- Succeeded by: Michael Macklin

Senator for South Australia
- In office 14 December 1977 – 30 June 1978
- Preceded by: Steele Hall
- Succeeded by: Ron Elstob
- In office 1 July 1981 – 1 March 1990
- Preceded by: Condor Laucke
- Succeeded by: Meg Lees

Personal details
- Born: Janine Winton Carter; 8 May 1945 Tanunda, South Australia, Australia
- Died: 20 November 2004 (aged 59) Adelaide, South Australia
- Party: Democrats (from 1977)
- Other political affiliations: Liberal Movement (until 1976)
- Spouse: Ian Haines (m. 1967; wid. 2004)
- Children: 2
- Education: Brighton High School
- Alma mater: University of Adelaide; University of South Australia
- Occupation: School teacher (Department of Education)
- Profession: Academic; Politician

The Hon. Janine Winton Haines, AM (née Carter; 8 May 1945 – 20 November 2004) was an Australian politician who was a senator for South Australia from 1977 to 1978 and again from 1981 to 1990. She represented the Australian Democrats, and served as the party's leader from 1986 to 1990, becoming the first female federal parliamentary leader of an Australian political party. She was pivotal in "shaping the Australian Democrats into a powerful political entity that held the balance of power in the Senate".

== Life ==
Haines was born in Tanunda, South Australia, to a schoolteacher mother and policeman father, and travelled around South Australia with her parents and younger brother, due to her father's job. They eventually settled in Adelaide and she attended Brighton High School. She married Ian Haines, whom she met at University of Adelaide where they were both studying mathematics, in 1967. They had two daughters, Melanie and Bronwyn. She taught English part-time and commenced an MA thesis on the poet Shaw Neilson but this was interrupted when she suffered a severe whiplash injury in a car accident.

She died in 2004, at age 59, from a degenerative neurological condition, and was honoured with a state funeral in Adelaide.

== Political career ==
Haines became the assistant of Robin Millhouse, an important player in the South Australian conservative party the Liberal and Country League. Millhouse founded the Liberal Movement and the short-lived New LM which merged into the Australian Democrats in 1977. She was appointed to fill a casual vacancy in the Senate by the Parliament of South Australia, on the nomination of Labor premier Don Dunstan, on 14 December 1977. As a result of the 1977 Referendum the appointment was required to be from the same party as the resigning Senator, "unless there is no member of that party available to be chosen or appointed". The casual vacancy arose following the resignation of Steele Hall who had been elected as a representative of the former Liberal Movement. Controversially, Dunstan chose to nominate Haines, who had been third on the Liberal Movement ticket from which Hall had been elected in 1975. Haines was not a member of the Liberal Movement at the time of her appointment, with the party dissolving in 1976. A majority of Liberal Movement members, including Hall and second on the ticket, Michael Wilson, joined the Liberal Party, while Haines joined the Democrats.

Haines did not contest the 1977 Australian federal election, and her Senate term expired on 30 June 1978. She was elected for a six-year term at the 1980 Australian federal election. On 14 August 1986, she was chosen by Democrats members as Senate leader on the retirement of inaugural leader Don Chipp.

She remained Senate leader until resigning to contest the House of Representatives seat of Kingston in the March 1990 election, believing the Democrats needed a "high profile lower house presence". She was unsuccessful in the face of a negative campaign waged against her by both major parties. She was succeeded as interim Senate leader for several months by deputy Dr Michael Macklin (Qld), pending the customary election of a new leader by party members, at which Janet Powell was successful.

== Later career ==
After leaving parliament Haines worked in a number of public positions including being president of the Australia Privacy Charter Council and deputy chancellor of the University of Adelaide.

She was vested with membership of the Order of Australia (AM) on 11 June 2001 and inducted onto the Victorian Honour Roll of Women in the same year.

She wrote a book Suffrage to Sufferance: One Hundred Years of Women in Politics (Allen and Unwin, North Sydney, 1992, ISBN 1-86373-365-5) which has been a prescribed text in universities and schools.

== Notes ==
Preceded by Don Chipp	Leader of the Australian Democrats; 1986–1990	Succeeded by Michael Macklin (interim)
