= Carolyn Ingvarson =

Carolyn Elizabeth Ingvarson
- Occupation: Retired
- Known for: Climate Change Action

Carolyn Ingvarson OAM, founder of Lighter Footprints, was awarded an Order of Australia in June 2024, for her 'service to conservation, and to the community of Boroondara'. After her retirement, her climate and environmental advocacy work, over twenty years, was fundamental to bringing together the three political parties in Kooyong, to discuss climate change, and instrumental in Monique Ryan's election to the Federal seat of Kooyong in 2022. She is an advocate of both climate action and gender equality.

== Early life and education ==
Ingvarson received a degree from the University of Tasmania in 1964. She was a biology teacher for 20 years, and then moved into the public service, in Victoria, Australia. She published a brochure called 'Jobs for the Girls' in 1981 for teachers. She has also published on her time as a teacher, and an article called 'Who need Daughters'.

Ingvarson stood for election within the Australian Senate in 1977 as a member of the Women's Party as part of the Women's Electoral Lobby. In the 1990s, she then became a local government councillor.

== Climate advocacy ==
In 2006, Ingvarson founded the environmental group, Lighter Footprints. The group grew up to 3000 members. Later, in 2022 she worked as part of the Federal election campaign in Kooyong, to establish a politician who valued both gender and climate change. This led to an independent Teal candidate, Monique Ryan, winning the seat from Josh Frydenburg. Later, following the election win, in 2023 Ingvarson then co-founded an organisation called Electrify Boroondara Inc. This group follows the principles of "Electrify Everything", with the goal of removing energy supply from gas, and increasing 100% of electrification of homes and buildings to remove dependence on fossil fuels, and reduce greenhouse gas emissions.

She described her work across climate change over many years and the impact of accepting one of her awards,

"I can never not be involved in climate change action. It's a bit like being a feminist — these things are long and slow and in your soul."

When Ingvarson started the group, Electrify Boroondara, the number of attendees at the first meeting was approximately 1000 people, held at the Hawthorn Arts Centre.

== Media ==
Ingvarson has been regularly interviewed about her climate leadership, and described the traits that lead to climate action, including resilience, perseverance, having a network of supporting colleagues, and taking time to meet with politicians and constituents, to ensure long-term goals are met. She has also made submissions to the Federal Government on reducing emissions and climate action, as part of Lighter Footprints. She meets with politicians to drive action on climate change and find commonalities across parties.

== Awards ==
- 2024 - Order of Australia.
- 2020 - Rawlinson Award.
- 2016 - Boroondara Citizen of the Year.
