= Tom Tehan =

Australian politician

Senator for Victoria
- In office 13 December 1975 – 30 June 1978

Personal details
- Born: 18 January 1916 Kyabram, Victoria, Australia
- Died: 1 June 1996 (aged 80) Fitzroy, Victoria, Australia
- Party: National Country Party
- Spouse: Hannah Huggins (m. 1943)
- Education: University of Melbourne
- Occupation: Barrister

Thomas Joseph Tehan (18 January 1916 – 1 June 1996) was an Australian politician. He was a Senator for Victoria from 1975 to 1978, representing the National Country Party (NCP). He was also state president of the party from 1975 to 1976. Prior to entering parliament he was a public servant and lawyer.

== Early life ==
Tehan was born on 18 January 1916 in Kyabram, Victoria. He was the son of Mary Josephine (née O'Brien) and Michael John Tehan. His father was active in the Victorian Farmers' Union and briefly served as president of the Deakin Shire Council. His paternal grandfather had immigrated to Australia from County Kilkenny, Ireland.

Tehan grew up in the rural locality of Timmering near Kyabram, where his father and uncle had a mixed farming property that included beef and dairy cattle, sheep, oats and wheat. He began his education at Timmering East State School, later attending Sacred Heart School and St Mary's College in Tatura before winning a scholarship to Xavier College, Melbourne.

In 1934, Tehan joined the Victorian public service as a clerk in the taxation branch of the Treasury Department. He began studying law part-time at the University of Melbourne in 1936 and in 1943 moved to the Crown Solicitor's Office. He served as treasurer of the Victorian Public Service Association from 1943 to 1947. Tehan eventually graduated Bachelor of Laws in 1945 and was admitted to the Victorian Bar in 1947. He subsequently left the public service and returned to Kyabram to practise as a lawyer, joining the firm of Morrison and Sawers.

== Politics ==
=== Early involvement ===
Tehan was chairman of the Kyabram Progress Association and was one of the leading advocates for a separate municipal government, which was achieved in 1954 with the separation of the Town of Kyabram from the Shire of Rodney. He presented the case for separation to the Local Government Advisory Board and helped organise a referendum of ratepayers.

Tehan joined the Country Party in 1949 and became president of its Kyabram branch. He was well-connected, with federal MP John McEwen being one of his legal clients and former Victorian premier John Allan being a friend of his father. He was an unsuccessful preselection candidate in the Victorian Legislative Assembly seat of Rodney in 1963 and for the Victorian Legislative Council's Northern Province in 1966.

Tehan was elected to the Country Party's state council in 1967 and as a national vice-president in 1973. He was appointed state president of the party in 1975, by which time it had rebranded as the "National Party". He resigned in January 1976 following his election to the Senate.

=== Senate ===
Tehan was placed in sixth position on the Coalition's joint Senate ticket in Victoria at the 1974 federal election, but failed to win election. He retained his place on the ticket at the 1975 election and was elected to a three-year term. However, at the 1977 election he was beaten by Australian Democrats leader Don Chipp for the final Senate seat. His term concluded on 30 June 1978.

In the Senate, Tehan spoke frequently on agricultural matters and was a "consistent advocate for the interests of the dairying, fruit-growing and canning industries of the Goulburn Valley region of Victoria". Unlike some of his NCP colleagues, he supported all four of the Fraser government's 1977 referendum proposals.

== Personal life ==
In 1943, Tehan married Hannah Huggins, with whom he had four children. He died on 1 June 1996 at St Vincent's Hospital, Melbourne, aged 80, and was returned to Kyabram for burial.
