= John Knight (Australian politician) =

Australian politician (1943–1981)

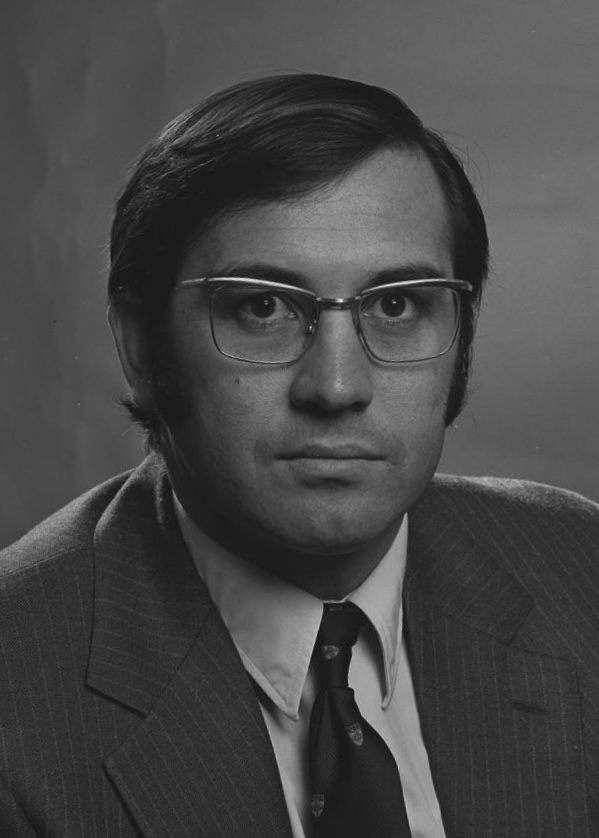
- Knight in 1973

Senator for Australian Capital Territory
- In office 13 December 1975 – 4 March 1981
- Succeeded by: Margaret Reid

Personal details
- Born: 20 November 1943 Armidale, New South Wales, Australia
- Died: 4 March 1981 (aged 37) Canberra, Australia
- Party: Liberal
- Spouse(s): Jennifer Major (m. 1964) Karla Havholm (m. 1971)
- Education: University of New England; University of Hawaii
- Occupation: Diplomat

John William Knight (20 November 1943 – 4 March 1981) was an Australian politician and diplomat. He was a member of the Liberal Party and served as a Senator for the Australian Capital Territory (ACT) from 1975 until his death in 1981, as one of the first two senators from the ACT.

Knight was born and raised in Armidale, New South Wales. He completed a history degree at the University of New England and later undertook postgraduate studies at the University of Hawaii. He joined the Department of External Affairs on graduating and held diplomatic posts in India, Fiji and Saudi Arabia. He also briefly worked as senior private secretary to Liberal opposition leader Billy Snedden.

In 1975, the ACT and the Northern Territory each became entitled to elect two senators to the Senate, and John Knight (Liberal) and Susan Ryan (Labor) were elected as the ACT's first two senators on 13 December 1975. He was re-elected at the 1977 election. John Knight represented the Commonwealth government at the bicentenary celebrations of Captain James Cook's arrival in Hawaii, in January 1978. In March 1978 he was appointed the Government Deputy Whip in the Senate.

== Early life ==
Knight was born on 20 November 1943 in Armidale, New South Wales. He was one of two children born to Myrane Ruth (née Porter) and Jack Albert Knight. His father was a grocer, Royal Australian Navy veteran, and former merchant seaman, while his mother worked as a dressmaker.

Knight was educated at Armidale Demonstration School and Armidale High School, where he was the school captain. He went on to study history at the University of New England, graduating Bachelor of Arts (Hons.) in 1965. He was later awarded a grant by the East–West Center to study at the University of Hawaii, completing his Master of Arts thesis on Pakistani leader Muhammad Ali Jinnah.

== Public service career ==
In 1965, Knight joined the Department of External Affairs as a cadet diplomat. After his initial training he was posted to the South Asia section. He learned Hindi and in 1966 was sent to India as third secretary at the Australian High Commission in New Delhi. After a period back in Australia, Knight was posted to Fiji in 1969 where he served as second secretary and first secretary. He took leave without pay in 1973 to join the office of Liberal opposition leader Billy Snedden as senior private secretary, where he was an influential adviser on foreign policy.

Knight left Snedden's office in 1974 to take up a three-month visiting fellowship at the Research School of Pacific Studies at the Australian National University. He then rejoined the Department of Foreign Affairs, initially working in its United Nations section and then in August 1975 being posted as a counsellor at the Australian embassy in Jeddah, Saudi Arabia.

== Politics ==
In November 1975, following the Whitlam dismissal, Knight won Liberal preselection as the party's lead Senate candidate for the newly created Australian Capital Territory seats. He was elected to the Senate at the 1975 federal election, with his term commencing immediately in accordance with the constitution.

Knight was chosen as a deputy whip in 1978 and succeeded Peter Baume as government whip following the 1980 election. He was active on a number of Senate committees, notably as a long-serving member of the Standing Committee on Foreign Affairs and Defence.

== Personal life ==
In 1964, Knight married Jennifer Major, a childhood sweetheart and teaching colleague. They divorced several years later and in 1971 he remarried to Karla Havholm, an American whom he had met in Hawaii. He had two sons from his second marriage.

=== Death ===
On 28 February 1981, Knight experienced chest pains while water skiing at Lake Jindabyne. He attended a doctor's surgery in Cooma, New South Wales, where he suffered a heart attack. He was treated initially at Cooma Hospital and then transferred to Royal Canberra Hospital. Knight died in hospital on 4 March 1981, aged 37. He was cremated with his ashes scattered at the Norwood Park Crematorium in Canberra and over Mount Duval near his home town of Armidale.

Parliament of Australia
New seat	Senator for the Australian Capital Territory; 1975–1981; Served alongside: Susan Ryan	Succeeded by Margaret Reid
