= Dorothy Ross (activist) =

Australian women's and rural activist

Dorothy Ross AM OBE

Personal details
- Born: 13 January 1928 Sydney, Australia
- Died: 13 October 1998 (aged 70) Holbrook, New South Wales, Australia
- Party: Australian Country Party
- Education: Bedford Physical Training College
- Occupation: Farmer, activist

Dorothy Dickson Ross AM OBE (13 January 1928 – 13 October 1998) was an Australian farmer and women's and rural activist who was the first national president of the Country Women's Association.

She was born in Sydney to John Ross, the member for Albury in the New South Wales Legislative Assembly, and Rita, née Mitchell, and was educated at Presbyterian Ladies' College, Sydney and Frensham School. She studied at the Bedford Physical Training College in Bedford, England, training as a physical education teacher. She returned to her family property at Holbrook in the early 1950s, and when she retired from teaching in 1957, she purchased 500 acres (200 ha) from her father. Around the same time she also joined the Holbrook branch of the Country Women's Association (CWA).

In 1971 she became the first single woman to serve as state president of the CWA, a position she held until 1974. In that year she was appointed by the Whitlam Labor government to the National Rural Advisory Council, on which she was the only female member. She ran for the Senate in 1975 and 1977 on the Country Party's ticket, being narrowly defeated both times. In 1976 she joined the fledgling Australian Press Council, and regularly contributed to local newspapers and to The Land, in which she had a weekly column. In 1985 she was elected as the first National President of the CWA, serving until 1988. She was created an Officer of the Order of the British Empire in 1975, received the Queen's Silver Jubilee Medal in 1977, and was made a Member of the Order of Australia in 1991 in recognition of her "service to women's affairs and to the community".

Ross died on 13 October 1998 in Holbrook, New South Wales.
