= Australian Marijuana Party =

Defunct Australian political party

- Founder: Jim Billington

The Australian Marijuana Party was an Australian political party in the late 1970s and early 1980s. Its focus was to campaign for the legalisation of marijuana. It ran candidates in several state and federal elections, although none were elected.

It was founded by Jim Billington, and ran candidates including independent journalist JJ McRoach and cannabis advocate Gwenda Woods.

== See also ==
- Legalise Cannabis Australia
- Cannabis in Australia
