= Justin O'Byrne =

Australian politician (1912–1993)

Justin O'Byrne AO
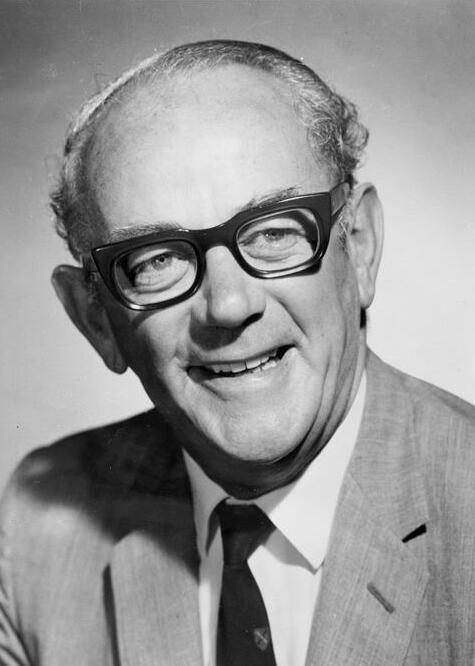
- O'Byrne in 1970

Senator for Tasmania
- In office 1 July 1947 – 30 June 1981

President of the Australian Senate
- In office 9 July 1974 – 11 November 1975
- Preceded by: Sir Magnus Cormack
- Succeeded by: Condor Laucke

Personal details
- Born: 1 June 1912 Launceston, Tasmania, Australia
- Died: 10 November 1993 (aged 81) Launceston, Tasmania, Australia
- Party: Australian Labor Party

Military service
- Allegiance: Australia
- Branch/service: Royal Australian Air Force
- Years of service: 1940–1946
- Rank: Flight lieutenant
- Unit: No. 452 Squadron RAAF

Justin Hilary O'Byrne, AO (1 June 1912 – 10 November 1993) was an Australian politician who served as a Senator for Tasmania from 1947 to 1981, representing the Australian Labor Party (ALP). He was President of the Senate from 1974 to 1975, including for the duration of the 1975 constitutional crisis that resulted in the dismissal of the Whitlam government.

== Early life ==
O'Byrne was born on 1 June 1912 in Launceston, Tasmania. He was the seventh of ten children born to Mary Elizabeth (née Madden) and Patrick Augustus O'Byrne. His father, a wine and spirit merchant, was the son of Irish immigrants.

O'Byrne grew up in the suburb of Trevallyn. His parents were devout Catholics and he received his schooling at St Patrick's College, Launceston. He left school at the age of 15 and found work at a textile factory. In 1929 he began working as a laboratory assistant at the Rapson Tyre & Rubber Company while studying chemistry and accounting part-time at Launceston Technical College. In 1930, during the Great Depression, O'Byrne travelled to Queensland from Melbourne on foot where he spent ten years working a variety of jobs including drover, fencer, bullock driver, tank sinker and station overseer. He joined the Australian Workers' Union in 1935 and became a committed socialist, influenced by the writings of G. D. H. Cole, Harold Laski, and George Bernard Shaw.

=== Military service ===
In 1940 he enlisted in the Royal Australian Air Force as a pilot, becoming a member of the No. 452 Squadron RAAF which operated with No. 11 Group RAF during the Battle of Britain. He was shot down over France in 1941 and was a prisoner of war in the Stalag Luft III prison camp in Germany for three years and nine months.

== Politics ==
Following the war, O'Byrne stood for the Labor Party in Tasmania in the 1946 federal election, and was elected. His term as Senator began on 1 July 1947, and from that point, he remained in the Senate representing Tasmania until 30 June 1981.

=== President of the Senate ===
Following the double dissolution of 11 April 1974 and subsequent federal election, O'Byrne was elected President of the Senate on 9 July 1974. He held this office until the dismissal of the Whitlam government on 11 November 1975. Senator Robert Ray said of O'Byrne's time as President of the Senate "Justin presided over the Senate during one of the most tumultuous and still controversial periods in Australian politics. The fact that there was not one dissent from his rulings, nor any vote of no confidence, is a testament to his performance and the high regard in which he was held by those on both sides of the chamber."

O'Byrne retired from the Senate at the 1980 election, his term ending on 30 June 1981. His term of 34 years is the longest by a Tasmanian in federal parliament, the third-longest Senate term after George Pearce and Walter Cooper, and the second-longest continuous Senate term after Pearce. From 1968 to 1971 he was a joint "Father of the Senate", and from 1971 until his retirement he alone held this title.

== Personal life ==
On 26 January 1984, O'Byrne was made an Officer of the Order of Australia "for service to politics and government".

O'Byrne died on 10 November 1993, and a state funeral was held at the Church of the Apostles in Launceston. He was the last surviving member of the 1947-1950 Senate.

He was a second cousin of Michelle and David O'Byrne.

== See also ==
- Political families of Australia

Political offices
Preceded by Magnus Cormack	President of the Australian Senate; 1974–1975	Succeeded by Condor Laucke
