= Andrew Thomas (Australian politician) =

Australian politician

Senator for Western Australia
- In office 13 December 1975 – 4 February 1983

Personal details
- Born: 14 March 1936 Blyth, South Australia
- Died: 14 May 2011 (aged 75) Adelaide, South Australia
- Party: Liberal Party of Australia
- Spouse: Jenny
- Children: Kym, Christopher and Elizabeth
- Occupation: Farmer

Andrew Murray Thomas (14 March 1936 – 14 May 2011) was a farmer, stud breeder and politician in Western Australia.

Thomas was born in Blyth, South Australia, the eldest child of Joy Gertrude née Tiver and Philip Murray Thomas, a farmer. After leaving school he became a farmer. He married Jennifer Margaret Eime on 27 March 1958 and they would have three children. His father died in 1962 and Thomas and his family moved to a property at Northampton, Western Australia where he bred merino sheep. He was active in rural bodies, including the South Australian Stud Merino Sheepbreeders’ Association, West Australian Merino Breeders’ Association, Australian Merino Society, Westralian Farmers Co-operative Limited (Wesfarmers) a board member of the Muresk Agricultural College and the National Advisory Council of the CSIRO.

He joined the Liberal party because it had a branch in Northampton, becoming president of the branch, chairman of the rural policy committee of Western Australian division and vice-president of the division from 1975. He was sixth on the Liberal senate ticket at the 1974 election, but was unsuccessful with the Liberals only winning three of the ten seats. He was fifth on the Liberal senate ticket at the 1975 election, where the Liberals won five of the ten seats. He was second on the Liberal ticket at the 1977 election and was comfortably re-elected. Thomas was one of the backbenchers who objected to the retrospective penalties in the legislation outlawing bottom of the harbour tax avoidance schemes and he was dropped to fifth again on the Liberal ticket for the 1983 Senate election, where he was defeated, with the Liberals only winning four of the ten seats.

Thomas died in Adelaide on 14 May 2011, aged 75.
