= Harold Young (politician) =

Australian politician (1923–2003)

The Honourable Sir Harold Young KCMG
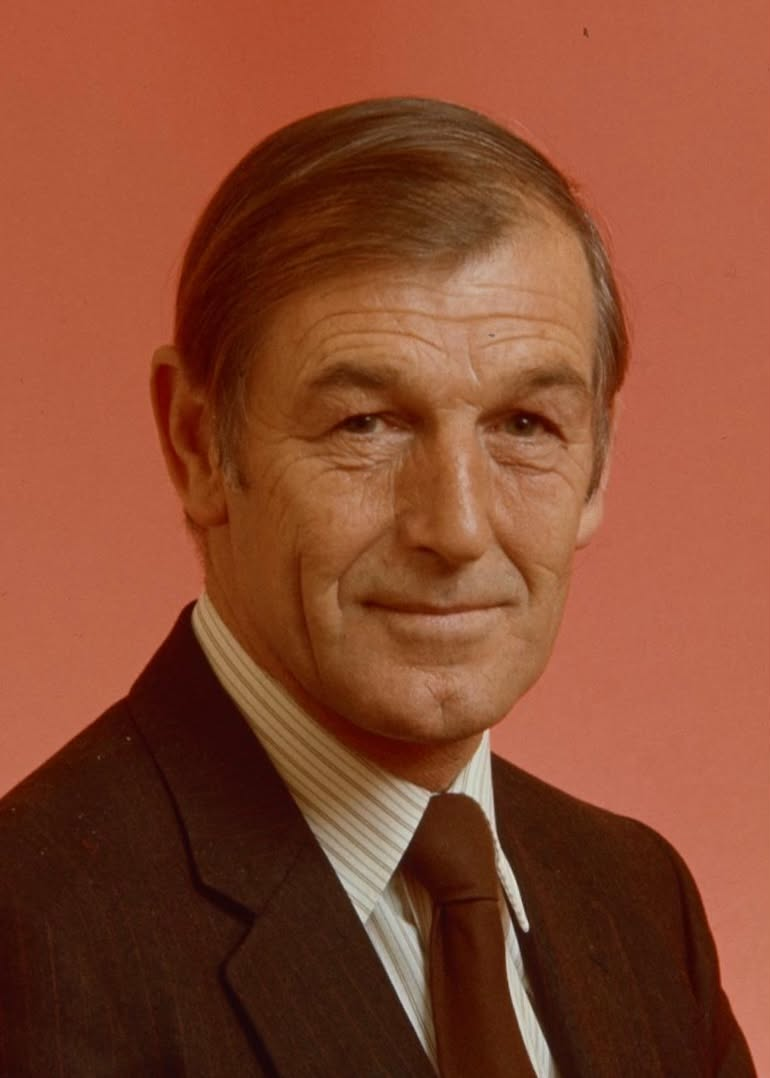
- Young in 1974

President of the Senate
- In office 18 August 1981 – 4 February 1983
- Preceded by: Sir Condor Laucke
- Succeeded by: Doug McClelland

Senator for South Australia
- In office 1 July 1968 – 4 February 1983

Personal details
- Born: 30 June 1923 Port Broughton, South Australia
- Died: 21 November 2006 (aged 83) Glenunga, South Australia
- Party: Liberal
- Spouse: Eileen Margaret Downing (m. 1952)

Sir Harold William Young KCMG (30 June 1923 – 21 November 2006) was an Australian Liberal Party politician who represented South Australia in the Senate from 1968 to 1983, acting as President of the Senate from 1981 to 1983.

== Early life ==
Harold Young was born in Port Broughton, South Australia on 30 June 1923 and educated at Prince Alfred College in Adelaide. Prior to entering Parliament, he was a wheat farmer and grazier and was involved with various industry bodies, including acting as vice-president of the South Australian division of the Farmers and Graziers Association.

== Politics ==
Young was elected to represent South Australia in the 1967 Senate election, his term as Senator commencing on 1 July 1968, and re-elected in 1974, 1975 and 1977.

From 18 August 1981 Young served as President of the Senate. He lost his own seat in the 1983 double dissolution election, the first sitting Australian Senate President to do so.

== Personal life ==
He was appointed a Knight Commander of the Order of St Michael and St George (KCMG) in the New Year's Day Honours of 1983, "for services to the Parliament of Australia".

Sir Harold died on 21 November 2006 and his funeral was held in Norwood on 27 November. He was survived by his wife Lady (Margaret) Young and their four children, Sue, Scott, Andrea and Rob.

Political offices
Preceded by Sir Condor Laucke	President of the Australian Senate; 1981–1983	Succeeded by Doug McClelland
