= Colin Mason =

New Zealand-born Australian politician, journalist, and author (1926–2020)

Senator for New South Wales
- In office 1 July 1978 – 5 June 1987

Personal details
- Born: 28 October 1926 Auckland, New Zealand
- Died: 18 July 2020 (aged 93) Wahroonga, New South Wales, Australia
- Party: Australian Democrats
- Occupation: Journalist, author

Colin Victor James Mason (28 October 1926 – 18 July 2020) was a New Zealand-born Australian journalist, author and politician.

Mason worked for 14 years as the first foreign correspondent of the Australian Broadcasting Corporation and became deeply involved in Asian affairs. In 1968, he wrote Dragon Army, a popular history of Asian communism.

He joined the Australia Party and rose to become its national convener (1976). He joined the Australian Democrats and was elected to the Senate at the 1977 election as a senator for New South Wales. He and Don Chipp (Victoria) were the first two Australian Democrats elected to the Senate, although Janine Haines (South Australia) had earlier been appointed to a casual vacancy.

He was re-elected at the 1983 double-dissolution election for a three-year term, and again at the 1984 election for a three-year term ending on 30 June 1988. He retired in 1987 when another double-dissolution election was called.

He later wrote A Short History of Asia (2000), concerning imperialism and the modern history of many individual countries in Asia.

In 2003, Mason released The 2030 Spike: Countdown to Global Catastrophe, in which he describes a confluence of six 'drivers' that he argues will converge in the decade of 2030: depleted fuel supplies, massive population growth, poverty, global climate change, famine, growing water shortages and international lawlessness. He describes more than 100 steps to be taken to mitigate this convergence, including a form of world government. In 2006 he released a revised edition, A Short History Of The Future: Surviving the 2030 Spike A copy of The 2030 Spike was found among 39 English-language books in the compound where Osama bin Laden was killed.

Mason died in July 2020.

== Bibliography ==
- 1965. Dragon Army: The Pattern of Communist Expansion Through Asia., Horwitz Publications
- 1968. Man in Asia, Southern Cross International
- 1977. The View from Peking: An Account of the Chinese People Today, Angus & Robertson, ISBN 0-207-95735-5
- 2000. A Short History of Asia: Stone Age to 2000 AD, St. Martin's Press, ISBN 978-0-312-23060-9
- 2003. The 2030 Spike: Countdown to Global Catastrophe, Earthscan Publications, ISBN 1-84407-018-2
- 2006. A Short History of the Future: Surviving the 2030 Spike, Earthscan Publications, ISBN 978-1-84407-346-7
