= Condor Laucke =

Australian politician

The Honourable Sir Condor Laucke KCMG
- Laucke in 1974

President of the Senate
- In office 17 February 1976 – 30 June 1981
- Preceded by: Justin O'Byrne
- Succeeded by: Harold Young

Senator for South Australia
- In office 2 November 1967 – 30 June 1981
- Preceded by: Clive Hannaford
- Succeeded by: Robert Hill

Lieutenant-Governor of South Australia
- In office 27 June 1982 – 28 May 1992
- Governor: Donald Dunstan (1982–91); Roma Mitchell (1991–92)
- Preceded by: Sir Walter Crocker
- Succeeded by: Basil Hetzel

Member of the South Australian Parliament for Barossa
- In office 3 March 1956 – 6 March 1965
- Preceded by: Electorate re-established
- Succeeded by: Molly Byrne

Personal details
- Born: 9 November 1914 Greenock, South Australia
- Died: 30 July 1993 (aged 78) Greenock, South Australia
- Party: Liberal
- Spouse: Rose Hambour (m. 1943)
- Education: Immanuel College, Adelaide
- Occupation: Company director

Sir Condor Louis Laucke, KCMG (9 November 1914 – 30 July 1993) was an Australian politician and businessman. He was a member of the Liberal Party and served as a senator for South Australia from 1967 to 1981. He was president of the Senate from 1976 to 1981. Prior to entering federal politics he was a member of the South Australian House of Assembly from 1956 to 1965.

== Early life ==
Laucke was born on 9 November 1914 in Greenock, South Australia. He was the youngest of six children born to Anna Louise (née Jungfer) and Friedrich Laucke. His mother was a Barossa German born in Neukirch and his father had immigrated to Australia from Germany in 1895.

Laucke was named after the German warship SMS Condor. His father was the founder of Laucke Flour Mills and was naturalised as a British subject in March 1914, allowing him to escape internment as an enemy alien during World War I. Laucke's mother died of cancer when he was two years old. He attended local state schools, Greenock Primary School and Nuriootpa Higher Primary School, before completing his secondary education as a boarder at Immanuel College, Adelaide. He also undertook chemistry classes at the Adelaide School of Mines.

After graduating Laucke joined the family business, becoming Director and General Manager of what was now a large milling and stock feed enterprise in 1947.

== State politics ==
Laucke was elected to the South Australian House of Assembly in the 1956 election, representing the Electoral district of Barossa as part of Sir Thomas Playford's Liberal and Country League government. He was re-elected in 1959 and 1962, and from 1962 to 1965 served as Government Whip and was regarded by colleagues as a potential future leader of the Liberal and Country League. However Laucke lost his seat to Labor candidate Molly Byrne in the 1965 election which swept the Liberal and Country League from office after 32 years in government—an election campaign in which Barossa, where northern Adelaide urban sprawl was overflowing into an otherwise rural and conservative electorate, was particularly targeted by Labor.

== Federal politics ==
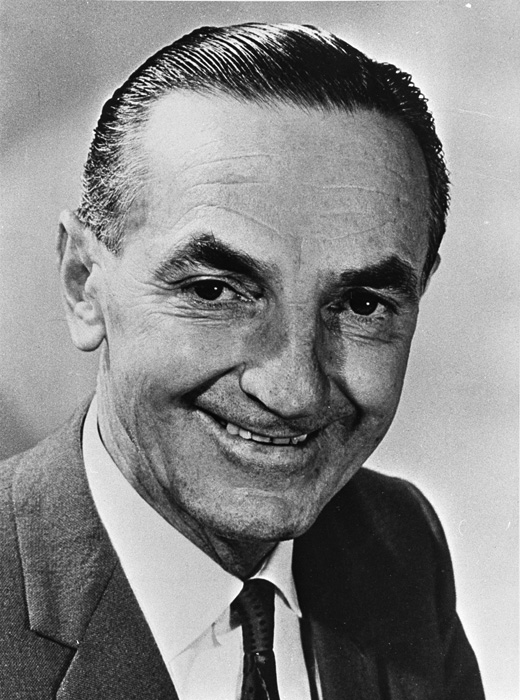
Laucke in 1969

On 2 November 1967, Laucke was elected by the parliament of South Australia to fill the casual vacancy caused by Clive Hannaford's death. He filled the remainder of Hannaford's term, which expired on 30 June 1968, and at the 1967 half-Senate election was elected to a six-year term in his own right. He was re-elected at the 1974 and 1975 elections, which followed double dissolutions, and retired at the conclusion of his term on 30 June 1981.

Laucke was President of the Australian Senate from 17 February 1976 until 30 June 1981.

== Later life ==
After retiring from the Federal Parliament, Laucke acted as Lieutenant Governor of South Australia from July 1982 to April 1992, during which time he performed the role of Governor for more than 300 days, while Governor Sir Donald Dunstan was either ill, out of the state or visiting remote areas.

== Personal life ==
Laucke married Rose Hambour in 1943, with whom he had two children. He died on 30 July 1993 at his home in Greenock, South Australia. He was granted a state funeral.

In 1974, Laucke was one of the founding members of the Barons of Barossa, an organisation formed to promote the Barossa Valley and its winemaking and grape growing industries, to preserve its heritage, traditions and standards, and to carry out philanthropic works.

On 30 December 1978, Laucke was made a Knight Commander of the Order of St Michael and St George "for Services to the Parliament of Australia."

South Australian House of Assembly
New district	Member for Barossa; 1956–1965	Succeeded by Molly Byrne
Political offices
Preceded by Justin O'Byrne	President of the Australian Senate; 1976–1981	Succeeded by Harold Young
Government offices
Preceded by Sir Walter Crocker	Lieutenant-Governor of South Australia; 1982–1992	Succeeded by Basil Hetzel
