= Geoff McLaren =

Australian politician

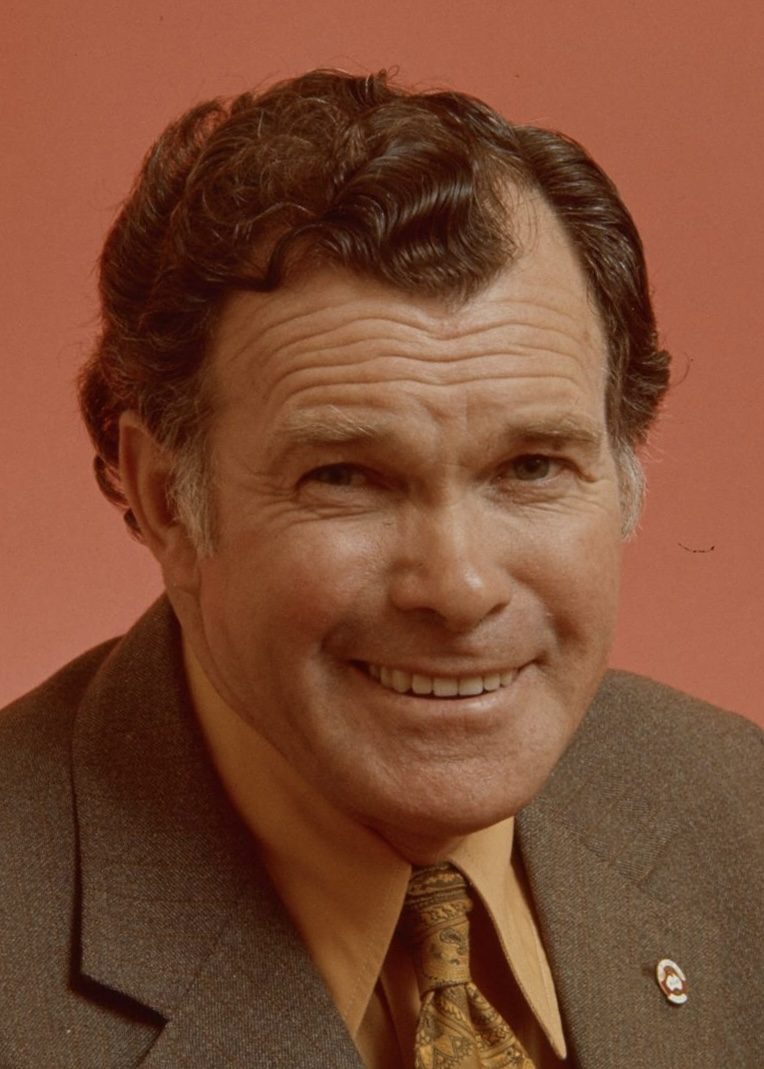
- McLaren in 1974

Senator for South Australia
- In office 1 July 1971 – 4 February 1983

Personal details
- Born: 1 February 1921 Koroit, Victoria
- Died: 30 January 1992 (aged 70)
- Party: Labor
- Spouse: Beryl
- Children: Harold, Yvonne, Douglas

Geoffrey Thomas McLaren (1 February 1921 – 30 January 1992) was an Australian politician. Born in Koroit, Victoria, he was educated at state schools before becoming a shearer. In the 1950s he moved to Murray Bridge in South Australia, where he later became a poultry farmer. In 1970, he was elected to the Australian Senate as a Labor Senator for South Australia. He held the seat until his retirement following his loss of preselection in 1983. McLaren died in 1992.
