= 1977 Australian federal election =

- 10 December 1977

All 124 seats in the House of Representatives 63 seats needed for a majority 34 of 64 seats in the Senate
- Registered: 8,548,779 ▲3.47%
- Turnout: 8,127,762 (95.08%) (▼0.31 pp)
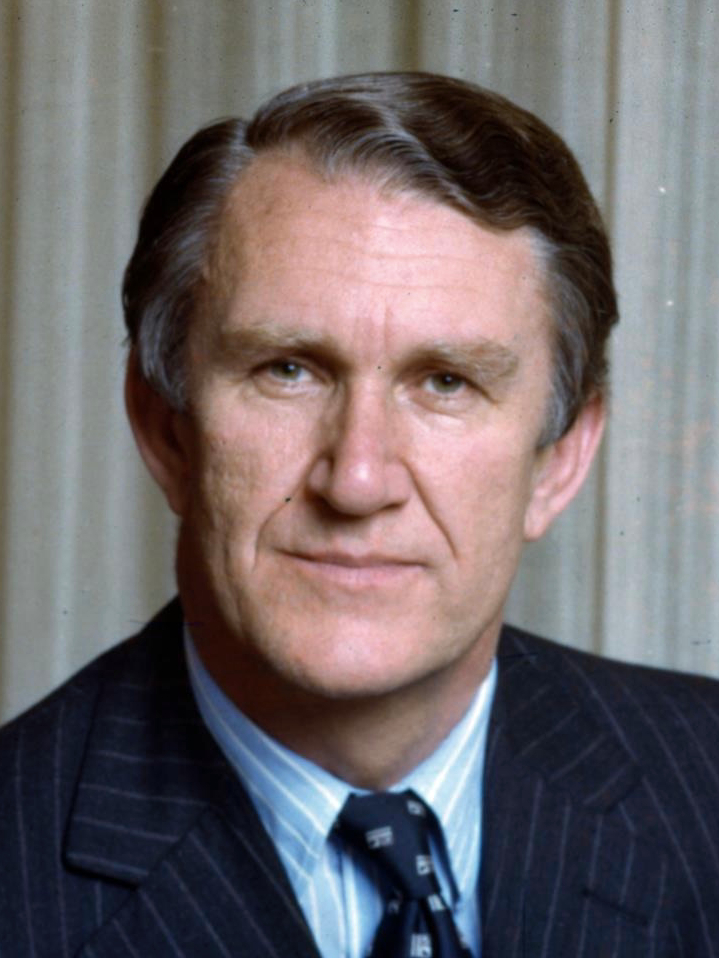

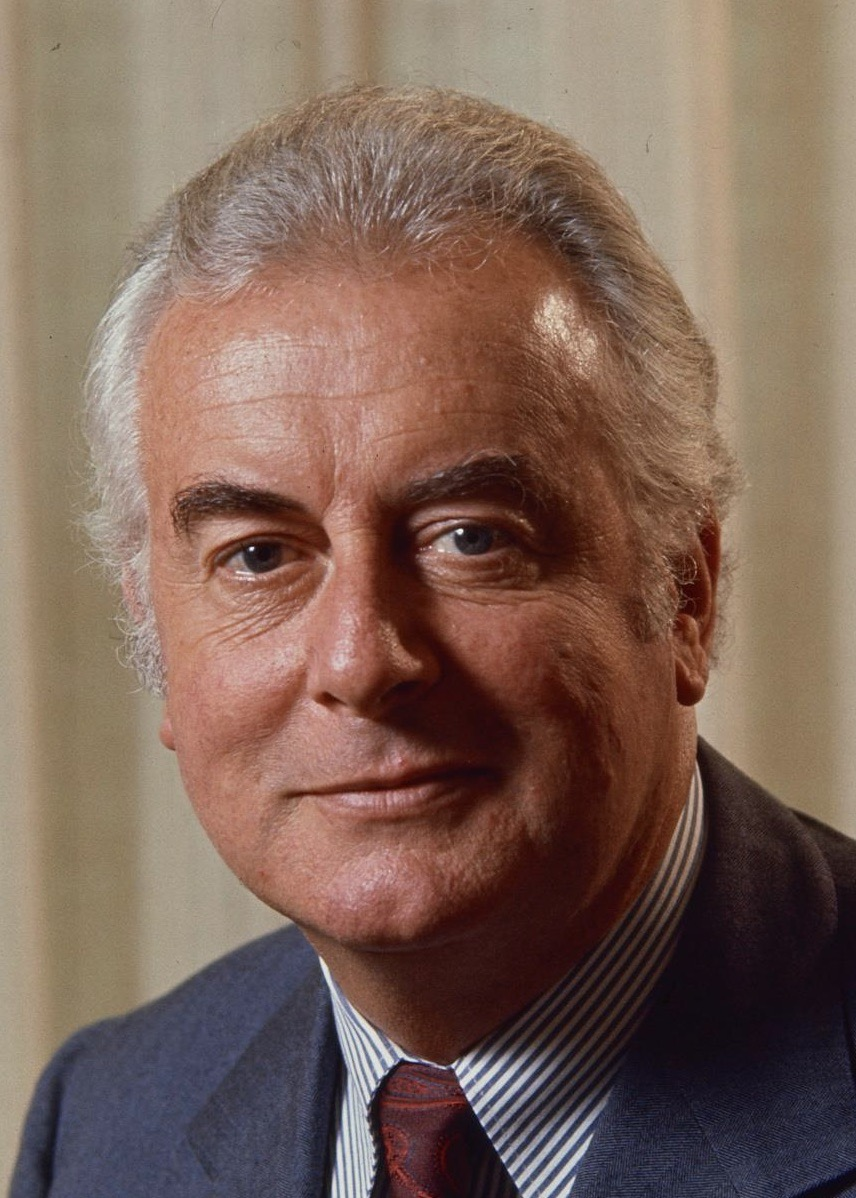
| | First party | Second party |
|---|---|---|
| Leader | Malcolm Fraser | Gough Whitlam |
| Party | Liberal | Labor |
| Alliance | Liberal–National Country Coalition |
| Leader since | 21 March 1975 | 8 February 1967 |
| Leader's seat | Wannon (Vic.) | Werriwa (NSW) |
| Last election | 91 seats | 36 seats |
| Seats won | 86 seats | 38 seats |
| Seat change | ▼5 | ▲2 |
| Primary vote | 3,811,340 | 3,141,051 |
| Percentage | 48.11% | 39.65% |
| Swing | ▼4.95 | ▼3.20 |
| TPP | 54.60% | 45.40% |
| TPP swing | ▼1.10 | ▲1.10 |
- Results by division for the House of Representatives, shaded by winning party's margin of victory.
Prime Minister before election
Malcolm Fraser
Liberal–NCP Coalition
Subsequent Prime Minister
Malcolm Fraser
Liberal–NCP Coalition

A federal election was held on 10 December 1977 to elect members of the 31st Parliament of Australia. All 124 seats in the House of Representatives were up for election, along with 34 of the 64 seats in the Senate. The incumbent Coalition government, led by Malcolm Fraser, was re-elected, defeating the Labor Party led by Opposition Leader Gough Whitlam.

While the Coalition suffered a five-seat swing, it still had a substantial 48-seat majority in the House. The Liberals retained an outright majority, with 67 seats. Although Fraser thus had no need for the support of the National Country Party, the Coalition was retained. Whitlam became the first and only person to contest four federal elections as leader of the Opposition. He was unable to recover much of the ground Labor had lost in its severe defeat two years prior, and resigned as leader shortly after the election.

== Background and issues ==
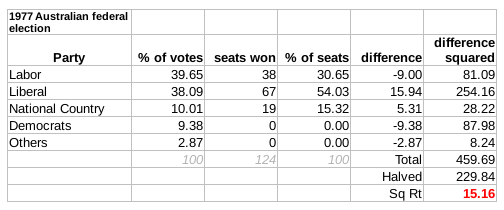
The Gallagher Index result: 15.16

The government offering tax cuts to voters and ran advertisements with the slogan "fistful of dollars". The tax cuts were never delivered; instead a "temporary surcharge" was imposed in 1978.

The 1977 election was held a year earlier than required, partly to bring elections for the House and Senate back into line. A half-Senate election had to be held by July 1978, since the double dissolution election of 1975 had resulted in the terms of senators being backdated to 1 July 1975, as per Section 13 of the Constitution of Australia.

The months before the 1977 election were marked by a substantial increase in the number of "boat people" arriving in northern Australia as a result of the Indochina refugee crisis, primarily of Vietnamese origin from the former South Vietnam. Immigration historian Klaus Neumann has identified the 1977 election as "the first in Australian history in which one of the major parties appealed to the public's unease about unauthorised boat arrivals".

== Results ==
=== House of Representatives results ===
Government (86) Coalition Liberal (67) NCP (18) CLP (1) Opposition (38) Labor (38)

House of Reps (IRV) — 1977–80—Turnout 95.08% (CV) — Informal 2.52%
| Party | First preference votes | % | Swing | Seats | Change |
|---|---|---|---|---|---|
| Liberal–NCP Coalition | 3,811,340 | 48.11 | –4.95 | 86 | –5 |
| Liberal | 3,017,896 | 38.09 | −3.71 | 67 | −1 |
| National Country | 776,982 | 9.81 | −1.44 | 18 | −4 |
| Country Liberal | 16,462 | 0.21 | +0.00 | 1 | 0 |
| Labor | 3,141,051 | 39.65 | −3.20 | 38 | +2 |
| Democrats | 743,365 | 9.38 | +9.38 | 0 | 0 |
| Democratic Labor | 113,271 | 1.43 | +0.11 | 0 | 0 |
| Progress | 47,567 | 0.60 | –0.18 | 0 | 0 |
| Communist | 14,098 | 0.18 | +0.06 | 0 | 0 |
| Socialist | 1,895 | 0.02 | +0.02 | 0 | 0 |
| Independents | 50,267 | 0.63 | –0.19 | 0 | 0 |
| Total | 7,922,854 | | | 124 | −3 |
Two-party-preferred (estimated)
| Liberal–NCP Coalition | Win | 54.60 | −1.10 | 86 | –5 |
| Labor | | 45.40 | +1.10 | 38 | +2 |

First preference vote
| Labor | 39.65% |
| Liberal | 38.09% |
| National | 10.01% |
| Democrats | 9.38% |
| Other | 2.87% |

Two-party-preferred vote
| Coalition | 54.60% |
| Labor | 45.40% |

Parliament seats
| Coalition | 69.35% |
| Labor | 30.65% |

=== Senate results ===
Government (34) Coalition Liberal (27) National (6) CLP (1) Opposition (27) Labor (27) Crossbench (3) Democrats (2) Independent (1)

Senate (STV) — 1977–80—Turnout 95.08% (CV) — Informal 9.00%
| Party | First preference votes | % | Swing | Seats won | Seats held | Change |
|---|---|---|---|---|---|---|
| Liberal–NCP Coalition (total) | 3,369,843 | 45.56 | –5.18 | 18 | 34 | –1 |
| Liberal–NCP joint ticket | 2,533,882 | 34.26 | −5.60 | 7 | * | * |
| Liberal | 783,878 | 10.60 | −0.48 | 10 | 27 | +1 |
| National Country | 36,619 | 0.50 | −0.04 | 0 | 6 | –2 |
| Country Liberal | 15,463 | 0.21 | −0.01 | 1 | 1 | 0 |
| Labor | 2,718,876 | 36.76 | −4.15 | 14 | 27 | 0 |
| Democrats | 823,550 | 11.13 | +11.13 | 2 | 2 | +2 |
| Democratic Labor | 123,192 | 1.67 | –1.00 | 0 | 0 | 0 |
| Progress | 88,203 | 1.19 | +0.32 | 0 | 0 | 0 |
| Call to Australia | 49,395 | 1.12 | +1.12 | 0 | 0 | 0 |
| Marijuana | 44,276 | 0.60 | +0.60 | 0 | 0 | 0 |
| Socialist | 42,740 | 0.58 | +0.57 | 0 | 0 | 0 |
| Australia | 8,283 | 0.11 | –0.37 | 0 | 0 | 0 |
| Independents | 127,850 | 1.73 | +0.13 | 0 | 1 | 0 |
| Total | 7,396,207 | | | 34 | 64 | |

- Independent: Brian Harradine (Tasmania)
- The Progress Party was the renamed "Workers Party" from the 1975 election.

== Seats changing hands ==
| Seat | 1975 | | | Notional margin (Note: For seats that were affected by the redistribution the Australian Electoral Commission calculated "notional" margins for the redistributed divisions by modelling the outcome of the previous election as if the new boundaries had been in place.) | Swing | 1977 | | |
| Seat | Party | Member | Margin | Notional margin | Swing | Margin | Member | Party |
|---|---|---|---|---|---|---|---|---|
| Angas, SA | Liberal | Geoffrey Giles | 21.5 | District abolished | | | | |
| Capricornia, Qld | National Country | Colin Carige | 0.1 | 1.5 | +2.7 | 1.2 | Doug Everingham | Labor |
| Darling, NSW | Labor | John FitzPatrick | 7.5 | District abolished | | | | |
| Dundas, NSW | New district | | | 10.0 | +0.1 | 10.1 | Philip Ruddock | Liberal |
| Evans, NSW | Liberal | John Abel | 2.0 | District abolished | | | | |
| Fadden, Qld | New district | | | 12.5 | –6.5 | 6.0 | Don Cameron | Liberal |
| Griffith, Qld | Liberal | Don Cameron | 8.0 | 1.5 | +5.0 | 3.5 | Ben Humphreys | Labor |
| Indi, Vic | National Country | Mac Holten | 17.2 (Note: Margin is over Labor.) | N/A | N/A | 5.1 | Ewen Cameron | Liberal |
| Lang, NSW | Labor | Frank Stewart | 7.4 | District abolished | | | | |
| Parramatta, NSW | Liberal | Philip Ruddock | 9.2 | –2.5 (Note: Had become a notional Labor seat as a result of the redistribution.) | +3.6 | 6.1 | John Brown | Labor |
| Riverina, NSW | National Country | John Sullivan | 11.8 | –2.4 | –2.3 | 0.1 | John FitzPatrick | Labor |
| Wimmera, Vic | National Country | Robert King | 14.2 | District abolished | | | | |

- Members listed in italics did not contest their seat at this election.

== Significance ==
This election marks the effective parliamentary debut of the Australian Democrats. The former Liberal minister Don Chipp had resigned his seat to leave politics but was soon invited to lead the new party and decided to run as a senator for Victoria. The party's Janine Haines had briefly inherited a South Australian Senate seat when Liberal Movement senator Steele Hall had resigned to contest a lower-house seat. Haines was, however, not preselected to recontest the seat. Don Chipp was elected in Victoria and Colin Mason in New South Wales (Haines returned to the Senate at the following election.)

The second Fraser Government had the second-largest parliamentary majority in Australian history (at the time) after the majority it won in the 1975 election. Gough Whitlam resigned as the leader of the ALP in 1978, and was replaced by Bill Hayden.

This was the last Australian federal election for the House of Representatives at which no women were elected, although there were a number of women candidates. Women have been elected at every federal election from 1980 onwards.

== See also ==
- Candidates of the 1977 Australian federal election
- Members of the Australian House of Representatives, 1977–1980
- Members of the Australian Senate, 1978–1981
