= Alan Missen =

Australian politician

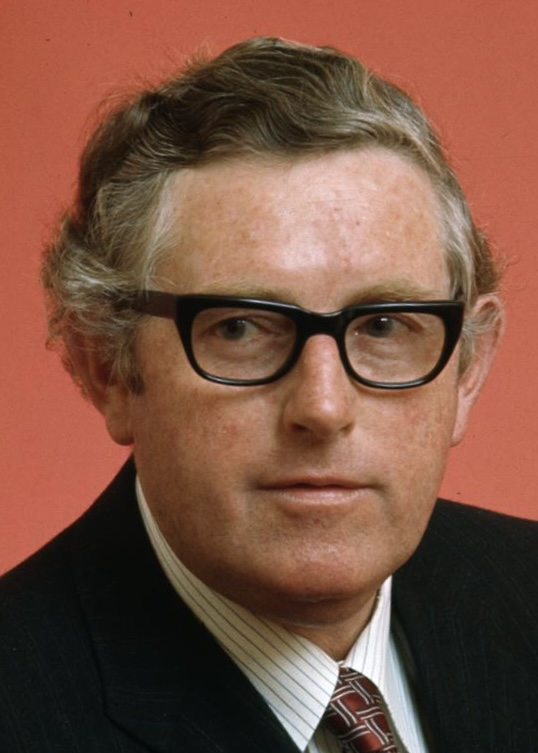
- Missen in 1974

Senator for Victoria
- In office 18 May 1974 – 30 March 1986
- Succeeded by: Richard Alston

Personal details
- Born: 22 July 1925 Melbourne, Victoria
- Died: 30 March 1986 (aged 60) Melbourne
- Party: Liberal Party of Australia
- Spouse: Mollie Missen (nee Anchen)
- Education: University of Melbourne
- Occupation: Lawyer

Alan Joseph Missen (22 July 1925 – 30 March 1986) was an Australian lawyer and politician. He was a member of the Liberal Party and served as a Senator for Victoria from 1974 until his death in 1986. He was known as a leader of the party's social liberal wing.

== Early life ==
Missen's parents were Clifford Missen, labourer, and Violet (née Bartley). Clifford hailed from Lismore in western Victoria and Violet from Chiltern in northern Victoria. They met in Melbourne where they married in 1920 and settled in the inner eastern Melbourne suburb of Kew. Alan Missen was educated at Kew Primary School, Box Hill High and matriculated from the selective Melbourne High School. He commenced a law degree at the University of Melbourne in 1943 and immediately became active in student politics.

== Formation of the Liberal Party of Australia ==
When the Liberal Party of Australia was formed by Robert Menzies in 1944, Missen, who lived in Menzies' electorate of Kooyong, became a founding member of the Liberal Party and the Melbourne University Liberal Club. He commented in later years: "What was formed was not a radical party on the model of the British Liberal Party. The members of Parliament constituting its first MPs were the same men who were United Australia Party members immediately before, and they brought with them their conservative ways of thought." In 1947 he commenced a legal career that was to last for 27 years until his election to Federal Parliament. He established a successful partnership with Roy Schilling and Bill Impey.

== Communist Party referendum ==
Robert Menzies was elected as the first Liberal Prime Minister of Australia in 1949 on a platform that included outlawing the Communist Party of Australia. In 1951 the Menzies Government called a referendum to provide the Commonwealth with the constitutional power to implement its policy. Alan Missen and a small group of other Liberal Party members opposed the referendum proposal. Missen's opinion piece in The Argus newspaper caused a furore in the Liberal Party. In a scathing critique of the referendum proposal, he poses the following rhetorical question: "Have we so little faith in our ability to defeat Communism in a free encounter that we must employ totalitarian methods against them?" The Liberal Party's Victorian Division voted to suspend Missen as vice-president of the Young Liberal and Country Movement. The referendum proposal was narrowly defeated, a major setback for the Menzies Government. Missen's defiant position on the Communist referendum caused him to be overlooked for Liberal preselection for the next two decades. (Note: For a more detailed analysis of the Communist Party dissolution debate, see University of Melbourne historical paper.)

== Marriage ==
Missen was engaged to Mollie Anchen, school teacher, in 1962. They met through the Debaters' Association of Victoria. Missen was the Association's president from 1958 to 1960. Former Labor Senator John Button debated against both and rated Missen as very good "but not half as good as Mollie, who was terrifying – really!" The Missens married in 1963.

== Political career ==
During the period from 1951 until his eventual election to the Senate, Missen was passed over for pre-selection for a Parliamentary seat on several occasions, due in part to his strong position taken on the Communist Party Dissolution Bill. He contented himself with significant activism at a "grass-roots" level, particularly with younger Liberal Party members and adherents. He was elected to the Victorian State Executive and participated energetically in its committee system and also was an early supporter of the quarterly Checkpoint formed in 1969 to stimulate a greater level of policy debate.

Following the defeat of the Liberal Government in 1972, after 23 consecutive years in office, the Liberal Party in Victoria underwent substantial changes. Missen was elected vice-president of the Victorian Division on the same ticket as the party's new president Peter Hardie. Missen also served as chairman of the Liberal Party's State Platform Committee, with a mandate to revise the party's platform for the first time since 1952.

Another Missen ally, Billie Snedden, was elected Federal Opposition Leader following the Liberal Party's electoral loss in December 1972. In 1973 Missen was elected by the Liberal Party's Victorian State Executive to a winnable position on the party's Senate ticket for the following Federal election. Journalist Alan Trengove speculated: "Whether Alan Missen has learned the art of political compromise or whether the Liberal Party has simply come to terms with his brand of liberalism only time will tell." In 1974, he was elected to the Australian Senate as a Liberal Senator for Victoria.

On 13 August 1974 he delivered his maiden speech to the Senate. The following year Missen found himself at the centre of the 1975 constitutional crisis. In March 1975 Malcolm Fraser had replaced Billie Snedden as leader of the Liberal Opposition. In October 1975 Fraser moved to defer supply to the Whitlam Government on the basis of the Government's economic mismanagement. Missen had serious misgivings about denying supply to an elected Government. In a speech to Liberal MPs and Senators on 15 October 1975 he recognised the Senate's constitutional power to defer or block supply but queried whether the circumstances warranted such a measure. He also raised concerns that the Liberal Party may win a subsequent election but be tainted by the divisive means of obtaining power. While Missen reserved the right to vote according to his conscience he never broke ranks on the floor of the Senate. The crisis ended unexpectedly on 11 November 1975 when the Governor-General dismissed the Prime Minister and issued writs for a double dissolution Federal election. Gerard Henderson has written extensively on the events of 1975 and reflected on Missen's pivotal role.

During the term of the Fraser Government (1975–1983) Missen made his mark as an activist backbencher and champion of the Senate committee process. In 1976 he was elected as chairman of the Senate Standing Committee on Constitutional and Legal Affairs and in 1978 he also took on the chairmanship of the Senate Standing Committee on Regulations and Ordinances. In 1981 he became the founding chairman of the Senate Standing Committee for the Scrutiny of Bills. These roles enabled Missen to focus on his policy priorities – human rights and civil liberties. He also served as chairman of the Amnesty International Australian Parliamentary Group.

During his parliamentary career - most particularly during the term of the Fraser Government - Missen crossed the floor on a remarkable 41 occasions, much to the chagrin of Government ministers and party officials. Reflecting on Missen's role, Malcolm Fraser commented in 1992: "People often confuse the concept of loyalty. You can be loyal to ideas, beliefs, philosophy and make that pre-eminent and I think that's probably the most important form of loyalty. Then there's another kind of loyalty which is one underpinning personal human relationships. Alan's pre-eminent loyalty was I think to ideas and concepts and I understand that very much because that is the kind of thing that any party leader has to understand."

When the Liberal Party returned to Opposition in 1983 Missen was among a small and shrinking band of small 'L' liberals. Missen found himself increasingly isolated as a new generation of economic reformers took control of the Liberal Party in Victoria and elsewhere across Australia. To compound matters, Missen was a supporter of Andrew Peacock during the mid-1980s when the Liberal Party was divided by leadership tensions between Peacock and John Howard. When Howard replaced Peacock as Liberal leader in 1985 Missen was further alienated. Soon after Howard's elevation he wrote a paper entitled 'The Winter of Our Discontent' about the direction of the Liberal Party. Missen was also seriously unwell. He had long been a diabetic and suffered a heart attack (which was not disclosed publicly) in early 1986.

== Death ==
Alan Missen suffered a second heart attack and died at home on 30 March 1986. His death was recorded in The Age on 31 March 1986, including a tribute from the Prime Minister, Bob Hawke. When the Senate met for the first time after Missen's death on 8 April 1986 a white rose was placed on his vacant desk by his close friend Senator Chris Puplick. Tributes flowed from all sides of the Senate, including heartfelt words from the Labor Attorney-General, Senator Gareth Evans: "He was absolutely, unequivocally and uncompromisingly an idealist – right over at the far, idealistic end of the political spectrum ... There have not been very many like him in Australian politics, and there will not be again". Alan Missen was survived by his wife Mollie, who died 12 October 2008.

Richard Alston was appointed by the Liberal Party to fill the casual vacancy following Alan Missen's death. Justice Michael Kirby delivered the inaugural Alan Missen Memorial Lecture on 10 November 1986 in Melbourne.

== Legacy ==
The Alan Missen Foundation was established in 1988. The Foundation, in conjunction with Liberty Victoria, holds an annual Alan Missen Oration. (Note: For example see Chaney, Fred (13 August 2005). "Where have all the Liberals gone? Alan Missen Memorial Dinner" (PDF). Liberty Victoria.) The Amnesty International Australian Parliamentary Group also holds an annual Alan Missen Memorial Lecture at Parliament House, Canberra. In 2010 the Accountability Round Table instituted the Alan Missen Award for parliamentary integrity. Missen's entry in the Australian Dictionary of Biography was published in 2012.
