= Misha Lajovic =

Australian politician

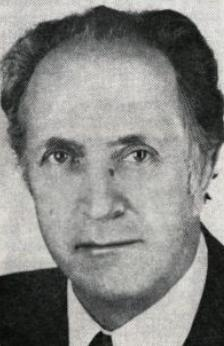

Senator for New South Wales
- In office 13 December 1975 – 30 June 1985

Personal details
- Born: 23 July 1921 Ljubljana, Slovenia
- Died: 5 June 2008 (aged 86) Sydney, New South Wales, Australia
- Party: Liberal Party of Australia
- Spouse: Tatjana Vidmar (m. 1942–2004)
- Occupation: Accountant
- Profession: Senator for New South Wales

Milivoj Emil "Misha" Lajovic (23 July 1921 – 5 June 2008) was an Australian politician. He was a Liberal Party of Australia member of the Australian Senate for New South Wales from 1975 to 1985, as well as the first migrant from a non-English-speaking background to be elected to the Senate.

Lajovic was born in Ljubljana, Slovenia (then part of the Kingdom of Serbs, Croats and Slovenes) and studied business and accountancy at the State Commercial Academy. His father and brother supported ultranationalist general Draža Mihailović and his Chetniks guerrilla movement, and Lajovic was imprisoned three times during World War II for suspected support for Mihailović. He left Slovenia in 1945 when communist Josip Broz Tito took power, moving first to Italy and then Australia, where he arrived in 1950 at the age of 30.

Lajovic went to the Bonegilla Migrant Reception and Training Centre and then to Holbrook, New South Wales, where he worked in a bottling factory. He worked in a clock and car accessory factory from 1953 to 1966, and then as manager for his brother's Sydney-based business Impact Containers from 1966 to 1974. He was the founding president of the Slovenian Association, vice-president of the Good Neighbour Council, and a member of the state executive and delegate to the state council of the Liberal Party.

In 1975, Lajovic was elected to the Australian Senate as a Liberal Senator for New South Wales. In parliament, Lajovic served on Senate committees for publications, industry, trade and commerce, education and arts, and estimates, as well as joint committees on public accounts and the Australian Capital Territory.

Lajovic was fiercely anti-socialist and anti-communist, decrying what he viewed as "totalitarianism". He supported migration and was concerned with the working conditions and social isolation experienced by migrants, but was hostile to the idea of multiculturalism, viewing it as divisive. He strongly supported the establishment of SBS by the Fraser government. Lajovic was twice accused by Labor Senators under parliamentary privilege (in 1976 and 1979) of being a Nazi sympathiser, which he fiercely denied. In 1981, he was one of several people named in a dossier tabled in parliament as "war criminals"; when The Daily Telegraph repeated the allegation, he sued them for defamation, resulting in a settlement from the newspaper. He held the seat until his retirement in 1985. He died in 2008.
