= Peter Baume =

Australian politician (born 1935)

The Honourable Peter Baume AC
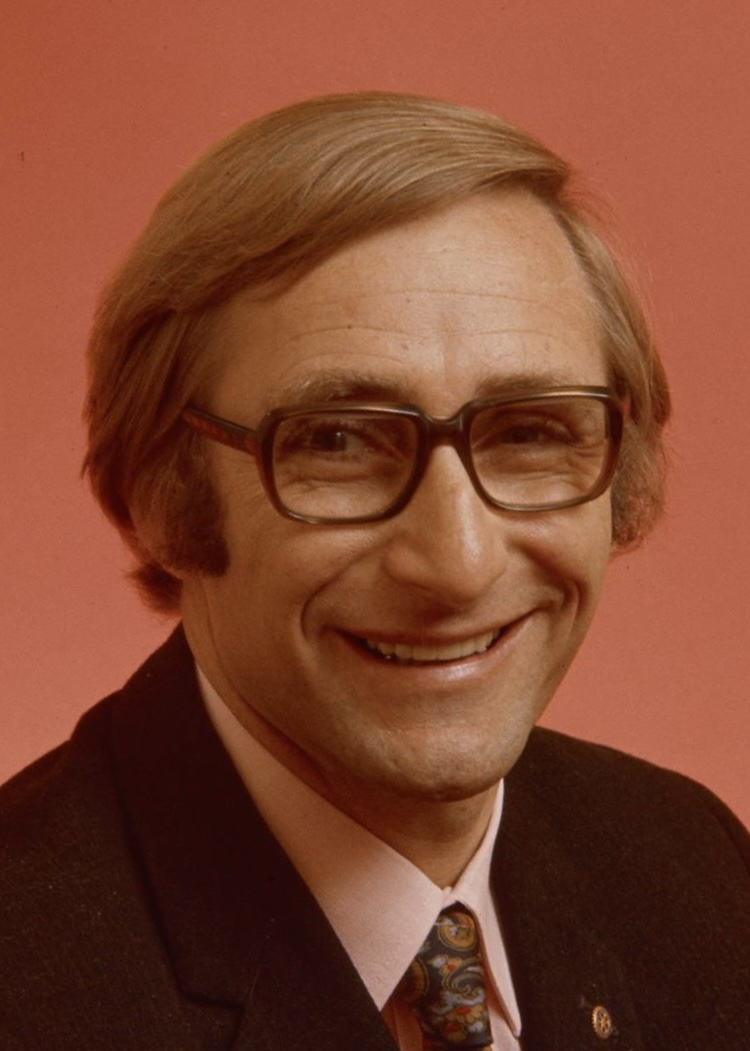
- Baume in 1974

Minister for Education
- In office 7 May 1982 – 11 March 1983
- Prime Minister: Malcolm Fraser
- Preceded by: Wal Fife
- Succeeded by: Susan Ryan

Minister for Health
- In office 20 April 1982 – 7 May 1982
- Prime Minister: Malcolm Fraser
- Preceded by: Michael MacKellar
- Succeeded by: Jim Carlton

Minister for Aboriginal Affairs
- In office 3 November 1980 – 7 May 1982
- Prime Minister: Malcolm Fraser
- Preceded by: Fred Chaney
- Succeeded by: Ian Wilson

Senator for New South Wales
- In office 18 May 1974 – 28 January 1991
- Succeeded by: John Tierney

Personal details
- Born: Peter Erne Baume; 30 January 1935 (age 91) Sydney, New South Wales, Australia
- Party: Liberal
- Spouse: Jennifer Tuson (m. 1958)
- Relations: Frederick Baume (grandfather); Rosetta Baume (grandmother); Eric Baume (uncle)
- Education: University of Sydney
- Occupation: Physician

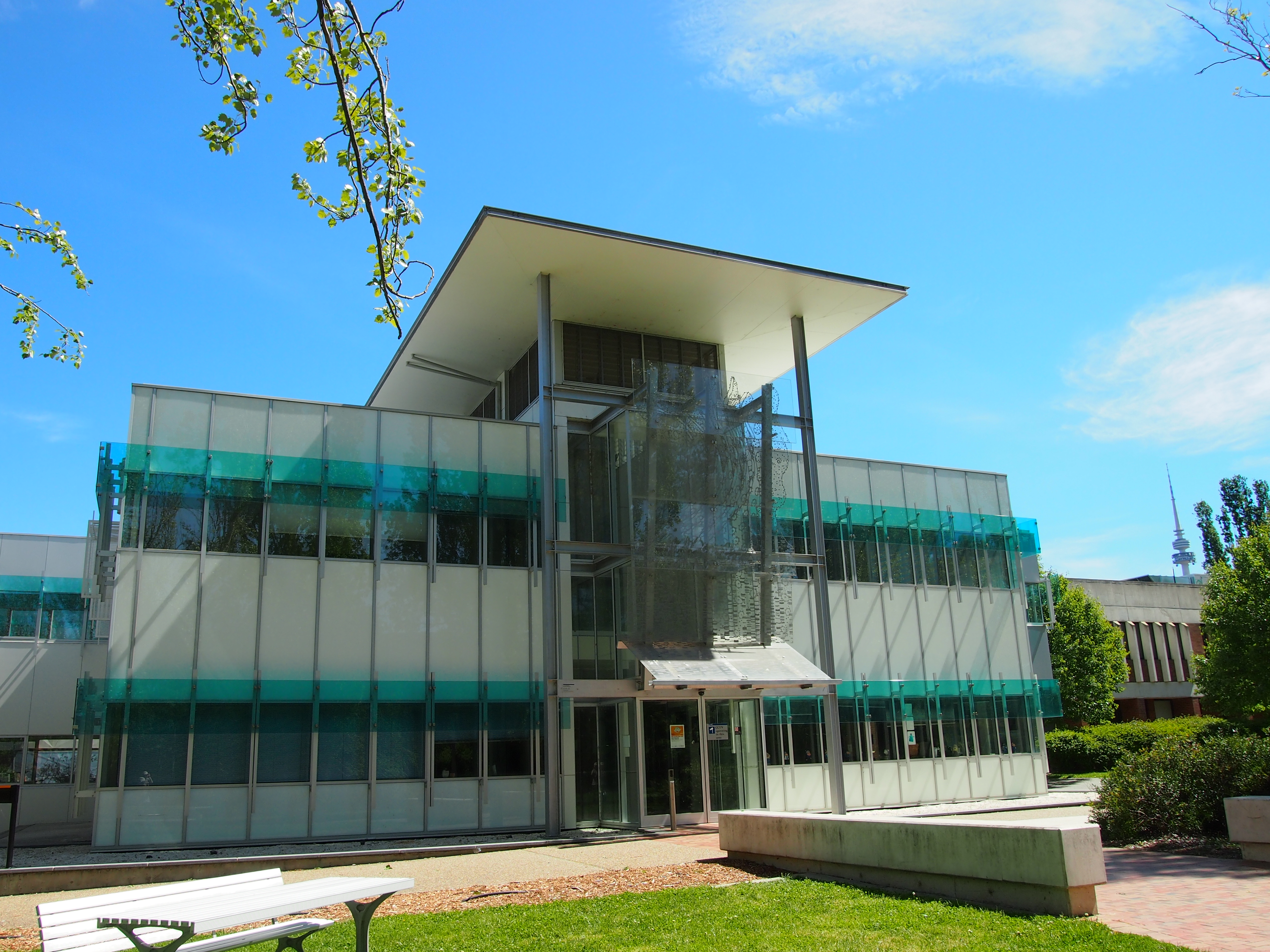
The northern face of the Peter Baume Building at the ANU. This building houses the Australian National Centre for the Public Awareness of Science.

Peter Erne Baume, AC (born 30 January 1935) is a retired Australian doctor and politician. He was a Senator for New South Wales from 1974 to 1991, representing the Liberal Party. He served as Minister for Aboriginal Affairs (1980–1982) and Minister for Education (1982–1983) in the Fraser government.

== Early life ==
Baume was born in Sydney on 30 January 1935. He was the son of Jean (née Brodziak) and Sidney Erne Baume. His paternal grandfather Frederick Baume was a member of parliament in New Zealand, while his grandmother Rosetta Baume was one of the first women to stand for parliament in New Zealand.

Baume spent his early childhood in Melbourne, where his father was manager of radio station 3UZ. He attended Ormond State School and Grimwade House, Melbourne Grammar School's preparatory school. The family later returned to Sydney where they settled in the suburb of Collaroy. Baume completed his education at Narrabeen Public School, North Sydney Boys High School, and Sydney Grammar School. After leaving school he completed his national service as a medical orderly at RAAF Base Richmond.

Baume went on to study medicine at the University of Sydney, graduating MBBS in 1959. He completed his medical residency at the Royal North Shore Hospital and was admitted to the Royal Australasian College of Physicians in 1962. He subsequently studied gastroenterology in the United Kingdom and the United States. He received the further degree of Doctor of Medicine from the University of Sydney in 1969. Baume worked in private practice as a gastroenterologist and physician at Royal North Shore Hospital before entering parliament. He was also a clinical lecturer at the University of Sydney.

== Political career ==
Baume was elected to the Senate for New South Wales, representing the Liberal Party at the 1974 election. As a backbencher he chaired the Senate Standing Committee on Social Welfare, which produced two reports: "Drug problems in Australia—an intoxicated society?" (1977) and "Through a glass darkly: evaluation in Australian health and welfare services" (1979). He was the Minister for Aboriginal Affairs from November 1980 to May 1982 and Minister for Health from 20 April 1982 to 7 May 1982 following Michael MacKellar's resignation as minister. He was then Minister for Education until the Fraser government's defeat in the March 1983 election. He was the parliamentary representative on the Council of the Australian National University from February 1986 until his resignation from parliament.

In 1987 when Baume was Shadow Minister for the Status of Women he contravened Liberal Party policy by voting for a bill giving equal employment opportunity in some government-owned bodies. He considered he was "... finished in the Liberal Party. It is true that one is allowed to cross the floor in the Liberal Party of Australia, but my philosophical liberal principles sat poorly with the increasingly dominant radical conservatism of others. It was time again for a change of career." He resigned from parliament in January 1991.

Baume is a cousin of former Liberal Senator Michael Baume.

== After politics ==
Baume was Professor of Community Medicine at the University of New South Wales (UNSW) from 1991 to 2000 and studied euthanasia, drug policy and evaluation. Since 2000, he has been an honorary research associate with the Social Policy Research Centre at UNSW. He works as a facilitator of bi-weekly scenario groups for the first and second year of the university's medical program.

He was Chancellor of the Australian National University from 1994 to 2006. He has also been Commissioner of the Australian Law Reform Commission, Deputy Chair of the Australian National Council on AIDS and Foundation Chair of the Australian Sports Anti-Doping Authority from 1991 to 1998. He was appointed a director of Sydney Water in 1998 following the discovery of cryptosporidium in Sydney's water supply.

== Awards ==
Baume was appointed an Officer of the Order of Australia in January 1992 in recognition of service to the Australian Parliament. In June 2008 he was appointed a Companion of the Order of Australia. He received an honorary doctorate from the Australian National University in December 2004. in August 2016 Baume was recognised in the Disability Employment Australia Hall of Fame for "his role in the 1994 Review of the Commonwealth Disability Services Program" (later dubbed the Baume Review).

The ANU 'Peter Baume Award', recognises "eminent achievement and merit of the highest order". It was first conferred in 2004.

Baume is a Distinguished Fellow of the Royal Society of New South Wales.

== Personal life ==
Baume married Jennifer Tuson in 1958 and they have one son and one daughter, the latter of whom has three children.

== Notes ==
Political offices
Preceded by Fred Chaney	Minister for Aboriginal Affairs; 1980–1982	Succeeded by Ian Wilson
Preceded by Michael MacKellar	Minister for Health; 1982	Succeeded by Jim Carlton
Preceded by Wal Fife	Minister for Education; 1982–1983	Succeeded by Susan Ryan
Academic offices
Preceded by Geoffrey Yeend	Chancellor of the Australian National University; 1994 – 2006	Succeeded by Allan Hawke
