= Electoral results for the Australian Senate in Queensland =

This is a list of electoral results for the Australian Senate in Queensland since Federation in 1901.

== Election results ==
=== Elections in the 2020s ===
==== 2025 ====
The Queensland senators whose terms expire due to this election are as follows:

- Malcolm Roberts (PHON)
- Larissa Waters (GRN, Leader in the Senate)
- Nita Green (ALP)
- Susan McDonald (LP)
- Gerard Rennick (PFP) (was elected as LP)
- Paul Scarr (LP)

2025 Australian federal election: Senate, Queensland
Party	Candidate	Votes	%	±%
Quota		368,010		
Liberal National	1. Paul Scarr (elected 1); 2. Susan McDonald (elected 3); 3. Stuart Fraser; 4. Sophia Li; 5. Yvonne Tunney; 6. Peter Zhuang	796,683	30.93	–4.30
Labor	1. Nita Green (elected 2); 2. Corinne Mulholland (elected 4); 3. Peter Casey; 4. Danielle Shankey; 5. Melinda Chisholm; 6. Brianna Bailey	792,918	30.78	+6.09
Greens	1. Larissa Waters (elected 5); 2. Navdeep Singh Sidhu; 3. Claire Garton; 4. Jennifer Cox; 5. Melissa McArdle; 6. Kirsten Kennedy	269,312	10.45	−1.94
One Nation	1. Malcolm Roberts; 2. Geena Court	214,299	7.05	−0.41
People First–Katter's Australian joint ticket	1. Gerard Rennick; 2. Robert Lyon	140,675	4.63	+4.80
Trumpet of Patriots	1. Harry Fong; 2. Robert McMullan; 3. David McClaer	109,329	3.60	+3.35
Legalise Cannabis	1. Belinda Jones; 2. Melody Lindsay	88,583	3.44	−1.93
Family First	1. Katie Lush; 2. Karen Fuller	54,066	1.78	+1.79
Lambie	1. Ange Harper; 2. Craig Schramm	41,467	1.61	+1.61
Indigenous-Aboriginal	1. Wayne CoCo Wharton; 2. Marnie Laree Davis	33,336	1.29	+0.20
Animal Justice	1. Michelle Jensz; 2. Gregory Dillon	27,345	1.06	−0.23
Australia's Voice	1. Michelle McDonald; 2. Cameron McClure Leckie; 3. Aidan McGuire	18,634	0.72	+0.72
Socialist Alliance	1. Jonathan Strauss; 2. Kamala Emanuel	18,760	0.62	+0.27
Libertarian	1. Jim Willmott; 2. Lachlan Lade	13,543	0.45	+0.45
Democrats	1. Scott Frazer Roberts; 2. Luke Daniel Pullar	11,215	0.44	+0.06
Fusion	1. Chris Simpson; 2. Frank Jordan	7,482	0.29	−0.08
Sustainable Australia	1. Rhett Martin; 2. Ross Honniball	7,238	0.24	−0.41
Citizens	1. Jan Pukallus; 2. Richard Frederick Healy	6,038	0.20	+0.00
Great Australian–HEART joint ticket	1. William Bay (resigned); 2. Catherine Smith	5,735	0.19	+0.19
Ungrouped	Gilbert Holmes; Danny Donohue; Duke Wong; Jason Brown	3,364	0.13	−0.96
Total formal votes		2,576,064	95.84	−1.04
Informal votes		111,685	4.16	+1.04
Turnout		2,687,749	71.90	−16.95

Results are not final. Last updated on 11 May 2025 at 7:30 PM AEST.

==== 2022 ====
2022 Australian federal election: Senate, Queensland
Party	Candidate	Votes	%	±%
Quota		430,553		
Liberal National	1. James McGrath (elected 1); 2. Matt Canavan (elected 3); 3. Amanda Stoker; 4. Nicole Tobin; 5. Andrew Cripps; 6. Fiona Ward	1,061,638	35.23	–3.67
Labor	1. Murray Watt (elected 2); 2. Anthony Chisholm (elected 6); 3. Edwina Andrew; 4. Christina Warry; 5. Jen Henderson; 6. Richard Pascoe	744,212	24.69	+2.12
Greens	1. Penny Allman-Payne (elected 4); 2. Anna Sri; 3. Ben Pennings; 4. Navdeep Singh Sidhu; 5. Alyce Nelligan; 6. Rebecca Haley	373,460	12.39	+2.45
One Nation	1. Pauline Hanson (elected 5); 2. Raj Guruswamy; 3. George Christensen	222,925	7.40	–2.87
Legalise Cannabis	1. Bernard Bradley; 2. Suzette Luyken	161,899	5.37	+3.62
United Australia	1. Clive Palmer; 2. Martin Brewster; 3. Desmond Adidi; 4. Jack McCabe	126,343	4.19	+0.67
Liberal Democrats	1. Campbell Newman; 2. Tegan Grainger	75,158	2.49	+1.66
Animal Justice	1. Mackenzie Severns; 2. Sue Weber	38,765	1.29	–0.04
Indigenous-Aboriginal	1. Lionel Henaway; 2. Jenny-Lee Carr	32,841	1.09	+1.09
Great Australian	1. Jason Miles; 2. Elise Cottam	24,262	0.81	+0.63
Sustainable Australia	1. Rhett Martin; 2. Timotheos Firestone	19,146	0.64	+0.35
Australian Values	1. Heston Russell; 2. Jay Hansen	18,194	0.60	+0.60
Informed Medical Options	1. Allona Lahn; 2. Jasmine Melhop; 3. Peter Lambeth	13,916	0.46	+0.18
The Silent Majority	1. Len Harris; 2. Debra Yuill	13,205	0.44	+0.44
Democrats	1. Luke Arbuckle; 2. Chris Simpson	11,473	0.38	+0.38
Fusion	1. Brandon Selic; 2. Roger Whatling	11,079	0.37	+0.37
Socialist Alliance	1. Renee Lees; 2. Kamala Emanuel	10,538	0.34	+0.34
Federation	1. Isabel Tilyard; 2. Jackie Bennett; 3. Michael Smyth	7,330	0.24	+0.24
Reason	1. Ron Williams; 2. Frank Jordan	6,514	0.22	+0.22
Federal ICAC Now	1. Kerin Payne; 2. Ken Carroll	6,199	0.21	+0.21
Citizens	1. Jan Pukallus; 2. Rod Doel	6,123	0.20	+0.13
Democratic Alliance	1. Drew Pavlou; 2. Simon Leitch	4,555	0.15	+0.15
Group H	1. Steve Dickson; 2. Rebecca Lloyd	4,566	0.15	+0.15
TNL	1. Bess Brennan; 2. Hannah Kennish; 3. Steven Hopley; 4. Jonathon Momsen; 5. Lloyd Ingram; 6. Jack Creighton	4,302	0.14	+0.14
Socialist Equality	1. Mike Head; 2. John Davis	1,129	0.04	+0.04
Ungrouped	Robert Lyon (KAP); David Schfe; Lindsay Temple; Chey Hamilton; Lorraine Smith; Laurence Quinlivan; Karakan Kochardy; Peter Rogers	14,096	0.47	+0.31
Total formal votes		3,013,868	96.88	+0.14
Informal votes		97,166	3.12	−0.14
Turnout		3,111,034	88.85	–3.07
Party total seats			Seats	±
Liberal National			5	▼1
Labor			3	Steady
Greens			2	▲1
One Nation			2	Steady

#	Senator	Party
1	James McGrath	Liberal National
2	Murray Watt	Labor
3	Matt Canavan	Liberal National
4	Penny Allman-Payne	Greens
5	Pauline Hanson	One Nation
6	Anthony Chisholm	Labor

=== Elections in the 2010s ===
==== 2019 ====
2019 Australian federal election: Senate, Queensland
Party	Candidate	Votes	%	±%
Quota		414,495		
Liberal National	1. Paul Scarr (elected 1); 2. Susan McDonald (elected 3); 3. Gerard Rennick (elected 5); 4. Ian Macdonald; 5. Amanda Camm; 6. Nicole Tobin	1,128,730	38.90	+3.63
Labor	1. Nita Green (elected 2); 2. Chris Ketter; 3. Frank Gilbert; 4. Tania Major; 5. Stacey Schinnerl; 6. Christina Warry	654,774	22.57	−3.81
One Nation	1. Malcolm Roberts (elected 4); 2. Steve Dickson	297,994	10.27	+1.08
Greens	1. Larissa Waters (elected 6); 2. Navdeep Singh Sidhu; 3. Johanna Kloot; 4. Raelene Ellis; 5. Miranda Bertram; 6. Kirsten Kennedy	288,320	9.94	+3.12
United Australia	1. Clive Palmer; 2. Martin Brewster; 3. Yodie Batzke	102,230	3.52	+3.52
Katter's Australian	1. Joy Marriott; 2. Gregory Wallace; 3. Alan Webb	51,407	1.77	−0.02
HEMP	1. John Jiggens; 2. Frank Jordan	50,828	1.75	+1.75
Animal Justice	1. Karagh-Mae Kelly; 2. Leah Coutts; 3. Belinda Hardy	38,624	1.33	+0.14
Conservative National	1. Fraser Anning; 2. Paul Taylor; 3. Mark Absolon; 4. Nancy Sandford; 5. Brad Cameron	37,184	1.28	+1.28
Shooters, Fishers, Farmers	1. Jeff Hodges; 2. Andrew Pope	29,329	1.01	−0.08
Conservatives	1. Lyle Shelton; 2. Joanna Lindgren; 3. Kate Horan	29,096	1.00	+1.00
Democratic Labour	1. Lindsay Temple; 2. Sheila Vincent	28,811	0.99	+0.42
Liberal Democrats	1. Gabe Buckley; 2. Lloyd Russell	24,000	0.83	−2.02
Rise Up Australia	1. Graham Healy; 2. Lionel Henaway	22,529	0.78	+0.57
Group R	1. Hetty Johnston; 2. Sue Mureau	18,341	0.63	+0.63
Pirate	1. Brandon Selic; 2. Miles Whiticker	13,432	0.46	+0.08
Climate Action!	1. Kris Bullen; 2. Robyn Stevenson	12,333	0.43	+0.23
Better Families	1. Darren Caulfield; 2. Adam Finch; 3. Rod Fox	11,735	0.40	+0.40
ICAN	1. Andrew Lewis; 2. Cornel Lokkers; 3. Gary Pead	11,536	0.40	+0.40
Love Australia or Leave	1. Kim Vuga; 2. Gavin Wyatt	10,099	0.35	+0.35
Australian Workers	1. Gregory Bradley; 2. Kathleen Wellstead	9,987	0.34	+0.34
Sustainable Australia	1. Cameron Murray; 2. Chris Simpson	8,446	0.29	+0.09
Involuntary Medication Objectors	1. Allona Lahn; 2. Adam Rowe	8,240	0.28	+0.28
Great Australian	1. Arjay Martin; 2. Tania Moohin	5,231	0.18	+0.18
Citizens Electoral Council	1. Jan Pukallus; 2. Stephen Harding	2,003	0.07	+0.00
Group X	1. Tony R. Moore; 2. Cartia Moore	1,557	0.05	+0.05
Ungrouped	Debby Lo-Dean; Gary Sharpe; Paul Larcombe; Jane Hasler; John Woodward; Nicholas McArthur-Williams; Hassan Ghulam; Wayne Wharton; Amanda Murphy; Paul Stevenson	4,668	0.16	+0.01
Total formal votes		2,901,464	96.74	+0.14
Informal votes		97,908	3.26	−0.14
Turnout		2,999,372	91.92	+0.23

Elected	#	Senator	Party
2019	1	Paul Scarr	LNP
2019	2	Nita Green	Labor
2019	3	Susan McDonald	LNP
2019	4	Malcolm Roberts	One Nation
2019	5	Gerard Rennick	LNP
2019	6	Larissa Waters	Greens
2016
2016	1	Amanda Stoker	LNP
2016	2	Murray Watt	Labor
2016	3	Pauline Hanson	One Nation
2016	4	Matt Canavan	LNP
2016	5	Anthony Chisholm	Labor
2016	6	James McGrath	LNP

==== 2016 ====
2016 Australian federal election: Senate, Queensland
Party	Candidate	Votes	%	±%
Quota		209,475		
Liberal National	1. George Brandis (elected 1); 2. Matt Canavan (elected 4); 3. James McGrath (elected 6); 4. Ian Macdonald (elected 8); 5. Barry O'Sullivan (elected 10); 6. Joanna Lindgren; 7. Dan Ryan; 8. Gerard Rennick	960,467	35.27	−6.12
Labor	1. Murray Watt (elected 2); 2. Anthony Chisholm (elected 5); 3. Claire Moore (elected 7); 4. Chris Ketter (elected 11); 5. Jane Casey; 6. Cheryl Thompson	717,524	26.35	−2.17
One Nation	1. Pauline Hanson (elected 3); 2. Malcolm Roberts (elected 12) (Note: Roberts was declared to be ineligible by the Court of Disputed Returns because he was a dual citizen of the United Kingdom. A special recount determined that Fraser Anning was elected instead.); 3. Fraser Anning; 4. Judy Smith	250,126	9.19	+8.64
Greens	1. Larissa Waters (elected 9) (Note: Waters resigned on 18 July 2017 because she was a dual citizen of Canada. The Court of Disputed Returns declared she was ineligible to be elected. A special recount declared Andrew Bartlett had been elected instead.); 2. Andrew Bartlett; 3. Ben Pennings; 4. Johanna Kloot; 5. Fiona Anderson; 6. Charles Worringham; 7. Rainee Skinner; 8. Janina Leo; 9. Meg Anderson; 10. Louise Noble; 11. Kirsten Kennedy; 12. Elena Quirk	188,323	6.92	+0.88
Liberal Democrats	1. Gabe Buckley; 2. John Rooth	77,601	2.85	+2.16
Xenophon	1. Suzanne Grant; 2. Daniel Crow	55,653	2.04	+2.04
Family First	1. Rod McGarvie; 2. Sue Baynes; 3. Kate Horan; 4. David Pellowe	52,453	1.93	+0.84
Katter's Australian	1. Rowell Walton; 2. Joy Marriott	48,807	1.79	−1.15
Glenn Lazarus Team	1. Glenn Lazarus; 2. Kerrod Walters; 3. Annette Lourigan	45,149	1.66	+1.66
Animal Justice	1. Paul Bevan; 2. Zade Watson	32,306	1.19	+0.12
Sex Party–HEMP joint ticket	1. Robin Bristow; 2. Therese Howes; 3. Kirsty Patten	30,157	1.11	+1.11
Shooters, Fishers, Farmers	1. Michael Turner; 2. Michael Gee	29,571	1.09	+0.39
Liberty Alliance	1. Bernard Gaynor; 2. Alan Biggs; 3. Chelle Dobson	29,392	1.08	+1.08
Marriage Equality	1. Marnie Southward; 2. William Moran	23,811	0.87	+0.87
Cyclists	1. Chris Cox; 2. Edward Re	19,933	0.73	+0.73
Drug Law Reform	1. Deb Lynch; 2. Lorraine Smith	17,060	0.63	+0.63
Democratic Labour	1. Sheila Vincent; 2. Lucius Majoor	15,443	0.57	+0.25
Justice	1. Deb Cotter; 2. Karin Hanbidge	14,256	0.52	+0.52
Arts	1. Frances Jankowski; 2. Neil Fainges	11,030	0.41	+0.41
Pirate	1. Brandon Selic; 2. Isaac Pursehouse	10,342	0.38	−0.12
Health Australia	1. Jason Woodforth; 2. Sarinah Golden	10,147	0.37	+0.37
Christians	1. Shea Taylor; 2. Malcolm Brice	9,686	0.36	−0.06
Lambie	1. Marcus Saltmarsh; 2. Crystal Peckett	9,138	0.34	+0.34
Christian Democrats	1. Wayne Solomon; 2. Ludy Sweeris-Sigrist	7,314	0.27	+0.27
Renewable Energy	1. James Moylan; 2. MaryBeth Gundrum	6,245	0.23	+0.23
Rise Up Australia	1. Paul Taylor; 2. Neroli Mooney	5,734	0.21	+0.00
Mature Australia	1. Terry Snell; 2. Belinda Cameron	5,519	0.20	+0.20
Online Direct Democracy	1. Peter Radic; 2. David Missingham	5,504	0.20	+0.16
Sustainable Australia	1. John Roles; 2. Matt Moran	5,366	0.20	+0.20
Palmer United	1. James McDonald; 2. Craig Gunnis	4,816	0.18	−9.71
Secular	1. Trevor Bell; 2. Scott Clark	4,623	0.17	+0.07
Defence Veterans	1. Jeremy Davey; 2. Darryl Hodkinson	4,534	0.17	+0.17
CountryMinded	1. Pete Mailler; 2. Sherrill Stivano	2,836	0.10	+0.10
VOTEFLUX.ORG	1. Mark Gardner; 2. Reece Flowers	1,881	0.07	+0.07
Citizens Electoral Council	1. Jan Pukallus; 2. Stephen Harding	1,877	0.07	+0.07
Socialist Equality	1. Mike Head; 2. Erin Cooke	1,639	0.06	+0.00
Group R	1. Sal Rivas; 2. Val Tanguilig	1,536	0.06	+0.06
Progressives	1. Ken Stevens; 2. Jo McCormack	1,213	0.04	+0.04
Ungrouped	Shyamal Reddy; Greg McMahon; David Bundy; Kim Vuga; Jim Savage; Tony Moore; Josephine Potter; Paul Stevenson; Marshal Anderson; Ian Eugarde; Julie Boyd; Leeanne Hanna-McGuffie; Zoemaree Harris; Michael Kaff; Terry Jorgensen; Gary Pead; John Gibson; Belinda Marriage; Greg Beattie	4,154	0.15	−0.01
Total formal votes		2,723,166	96.60	−1.25
Informal votes		95,831	3.40	+1.25
Turnout		2,818,997	91.65	−2.52

#	Senator	Party
1	George Brandis	LNP
2	Murray Watt	Labor
3	Pauline Hanson	One Nation
4	Matt Canavan	LNP
5	Anthony Chisholm	Labor
6	James McGrath	LNP
7	Claire Moore	Labor
8	Ian Macdonald	LNP
9	Larissa Waters	Greens
10	Barry O'Sullivan	LNP
11	Chris Ketter	Labor
12	Malcolm Roberts	One Nation

==== 2013 ====
2013 Australian federal election: Senate, Queensland
Party	Candidate	Votes	%	±%
Quota		374,209		
Liberal National	1. Ian Macdonald (elected 1); 2. James McGrath (elected 3); 3. Matt Canavan (elected 6); 4. David Goodwin; 5. Theresa Craig; 6. Amanda Stoker	1,084,299	41.39	−0.03
Labor	1. Chris Ketter (elected 2); 2. Claire Moore (elected 4); 3. Mark Furner; 4. Nikki Boyd	747,096	28.52	−0.87
Palmer United	1. Glenn Lazarus (elected 5); 2. Scott Higgins; 3. Clive Mensink	258,944	9.89	+9.89
Greens	1. Adam Stone; 2. Sandra Bayley; 3. Stuart Yeaman	158,150	6.04	−6.72
Katter's Australian	1. James Blundell; 2. Shane Paulger; 3. Les Muckan	76,918	2.94	+2.94
Sex Party	1. Joel Murray; 2. Kirsty Patten	29,380	1.12	−1.47
Family First	1. Aidan McLindon; 2. Sally Vincent	28,644	1.09	−2.33
Animal Justice	1. Jeanette Peterson; 2. Christopher O'Brien	27,984	1.07	+1.07
HEMP	1. James Moylan; 2. Robbo Yobbo	23,624	0.90	+0.90
Motoring Enthusiasts	1. Keith Littler; 2. Tony Morrison	18,742	0.72	+0.72
Shooters and Fishers	1. David Curless; 2. Pete Johnson	18,235	0.70	−1.04
Liberal Democrats	1. Gabriel Buckley; 2. Cameron Mitchell	18,201	0.69	−1.56
One Nation	1. Jim Savage; 2. Ian Nelson	14,348	0.55	−0.36
Fishing and Lifestyle	1. Daniel McCarthy; 2. Suzzanne Wyatt	13,394	0.51	−1.47
Pirate	1. Liam Pomfret; 2. Melanie Thomas	12,973	0.50	+0.50
Australian Independents	1. Patricia Petersen; 2. Janene Maxwell-Jones	12,448	0.48	+0.48
Christians	1. Ludy Sweeris-Sigrist; 2. Malcolm Brice	10,970	0.42	+0.42
Democratic Labour	1. John Quinn; 2. Sheila Vincent	8,376	0.32	−0.14
Outdoor Recreation	1. John Rooth; 2. Fay Destry	7,085	0.27	+0.27
Democrats	1. Paul Stevenson; 2. Cheryl Hayden	6,611	0.25	−0.53
Australia First	1. Peter Schuback; 2. Peter Watson	6,531	0.25	−0.15
Rise Up Australia	1. Michael Jennings; 2. Garry White	5,567	0.21	+0.21
Smokers Rights	1. Rachel Connor; 2. Kelly Liddle	5,235	0.20	+0.20
Australian Voice	1. Bevan Collingwood; 2. George Friend	3,828	0.15	+0.15
Secular	1. Hilton Travis; 2. Neil Muirhead	2,663	0.10	+0.02
Uniting Australia	1. John Smith; 2. Danny Watt; 3. Peter Banhuk	2,580	0.10	+0.10
Stop CSG	1. Brian Monk; 2. Deedre Kabel	2,357	0.09	+0.09
Climate Sceptics	1. Terence Cardwell; 2. Alan Rutland	2,134	0.08	−0.11
Group C	1. Peter Keioskie; 2. Roland Taylor	2,099	0.08	+0.08
Group U	1. Greg Rudd; 2. Emily Dinsey	2,057	0.08	+0.08
Building Australia	1. Stuart Osman; 2. Ryan Harris	1,782	0.07	+0.07
Socialist Equality	1. Mike Head; 2. Gabriela Zabala	1,642	0.06	+0.06
Stable Population	2. Jane O'Sullivan; 2. Matt Moran	1,563	0.06	+0.06
Senator Online	1. LB Joum; 2. Ricky Jefferyes	1,053	0.04	−0.32
Republican	1. Jeffery Talbot; 2. Rees Pearse	993	0.04	+0.04
Protectionist	1. Doug Boag; 2. Rick Heyward	955	0.04	+0.04
Total formal votes		2,619,461	97.84	+1.34
Informal votes		57,947	2.16	−1.34
Turnout		2,677,408	94.17	+0.79

Elected	#	Senator	Party
2013	1	Ian Macdonald	LNP
2013	2	Chris Ketter	Labor
2013	3	James McGrath	LNP
2013	4	Claire Moore	Labor
2013	5	Glenn Lazarus	Palmer
2013	6	Matt Canavan	LNP
2010
2010	1	George Brandis	LNP
2010	2	Joe Ludwig	Labor
2010	3	Barnaby Joyce	LNP
2010	4	Jan McLucas	Labor
2010	5	Larissa Waters	Greens
2010	6	Brett Mason	LNP

==== 2010 ====
2010 Australian federal election: Senate, Queensland
Party	Candidate	Votes	%	±%
Quota		350,074		
Liberal National	1. George Brandis (elected 1); 2. Barnaby Joyce (elected 3); 3. Brett Mason (elected 6); 4. Russell Trood; 5. Julie Boyd	1,015,062	41.42	+1.02
Labor	1. Joe Ludwig (elected 2); 2. Jan McLucas (elected 4); 3. David Smith; 4. Shannon Fentiman	720,182	29.39	−9.81
Greens	1. Larissa Waters (elected 5); 2. Elizabeth Connors; 3. Jenny Stirling	312,804	12.76	+5.44
Family First	1. Wendy Francis; 2. Peter Findlay; 3. Amanda Nickson	83,786	3.42	+1.22
Sex Party	1. Desiree Gibson; 2. Tim Sheen	63,586	2.59	+2.59
Liberal Democrats	1. Jim Fryar; 2. Robert Fulton	55,222	2.25	+2.09
Fishing and Lifestyle	1. Keith Douglas; 2. Michael Mansfield	48,547	1.98	+1.19
Shooters and Fishers	1. Andrew Peter; 2. Chris Huggett	42,669	1.74	+1.21
One Nation	1. Rod Evans; 2. Ian Nelson	22,353	0.91	+0.74
Democrats	1. Paul Stevenson; 2. Jennifer Cluse	19,019	0.78	−1.10
Democratic Labor	1. Tony Zegenhagen; 2. Angelique Barr; 3. Noel Jackson	11,186	0.46	+0.16
Christian Democrats	1. Malcolm Brice; 2. Tony Vogel	10,449	0.43	+0.17
Australia First	1. Peter Schuback; 2. Nick Maine	9,680	0.40	+0.40
Senator On-Line	1. Scott Reading; 2. Joh Embrey	8,908	0.36	+0.31
Carers Alliance	1. Anne Vetter; 2. Vicki Horne	6,758	0.28	+0.08
Climate Sceptics	1. Terence Cardwell; 2. Lance Jones	4,665	0.19	+0.19
Socialist Alliance	1. Sam Watson; 2. David Lowe	3,806	0.16	+0.08
Citizens Electoral Council	1. Robert Thies; 2. Maurice Hetherington	3,021	0.12	+0.07
	1. Russell Wattie; 2. John Dowell	2,314	0.09	+0.09
Secular	1. Kat Alberts; 2. Peter Shelton	1,997	0.08	+0.08
	1. Paul Spencer; 2. Mary Spencer	1,163	0.05	+0.05
	1. E-Jay Lindsay-Park; 2. Lachlan Guerin	1,031	0.04	+0.04
Independent	Mark White	863	0.04	+0.04
	1. John Pyke; 2. Christopher Tooley	765	0.03	+0.03
Independent	Maurie Carroll	221	0.01	+0.01
Republican Democrats	Peter Pyke	176	0.01	+0.01
Independent	Don Bambrick	125	0.01	+0.01
Independent	Mark Smith	86	0.00	+0.00
Independent	Jarrod Wirth	67	0.00	+0.00
Total formal votes		2,450,511	96.50	−1.16
Informal votes		88,761	3.50	+1.16
Turnout		2,539,272	93.38	−1.43

Elected	#	Senator	Party
2010	1	George Brandis	LNP
2010	2	Joe Ludwig	Labor
2010	3	Barnaby Joyce	LNP
2010	4	Jan McLucas	Labor
2010	5	Larissa Waters	Greens
2010	6	Brett Mason	LNP
2007
2007	1	Ian Macdonald	Liberal
2007	2	John Hogg	Labor
2007	3	Sue Boyce	Liberal
2007	4	Claire Moore	Labor
2007	5	Ron Boswell	National
2007	6	Mark Furner	Labor

Primary votes saw the LNP and Labor both winning two seats, with the LNP and Greens having a sizable majority against Family First and the Sex Party for the final two seats. Labor and Australian Democrat preferences saw the Greens reaching the quota, while preferences from the Shooters and Fishers, One Nation, Liberal Democrats, Family First and Sex Party all saw the Australian Fishing and Lifestyle Party make a large gain on the Liberal National Party. However, the gain was not enough and the LNP ended up winning the final seat. The final result was three seats LNP, two seats Labor and one seat Green.

=== Elections in the 2000s ===
==== 2007 ====
Elected	#	Senator	Party
2007	1	Ian Macdonald	Liberal
2007	2	John Hogg	Labor
2007	3	Sue Boyce	Liberal
2007	4	Claire Moore	Labor
2007	5	Ron Boswell	National
2007	6	Mark Furner	Labor
2004
2004	1	Brett Mason	Liberal
2004	2	Jan McLucas	Labor
2004	3	George Brandis	Liberal
2004	4	Joe Ludwig	Labor
2004	5	Barnaby Joyce	National
2004	3	Russell Trood	Liberal

2007 Australian federal election: Senate, Queensland
Party	Candidate	Votes	%	±%
Quota		345,559		
Liberal/National Coalition	1. Ian Macdonald (Lib) (elected 1); 2. Sue Boyce (Lib) (elected 3); 3. Ron Boswell (Nat) (elected 5); 4. Mark Powell (Lib); 5. David Goodwin (Nat); 6. Scott Buchholz (Nat)	977,316	40.40	−4.50
Labor	1. John Hogg (elected 2); 2. Claire Moore (elected 4); 3. Mark Furner (elected 6); 4. Diana O'Brien	948,145	39.20	+7.55
Greens	1. Larissa Waters; 2. Anja Light; 3. Darryl Rosin	177,063	7.32	+1.92
Pauline's UAP	1. Pauline Hanson; 2. David Saville	101,461	4.19	+4.19
Family First	1. Jeff Buchanan; 2. Beryl Spencer; 3. Merlin Manners; 4. Cathy Eaton; 5. Shaun Hart; 6. Elizabeth Benson-Scott	53,249	2.20	−1.17
Democrats	1. Andrew Bartlett; 2. Sharon Neill	45,584	1.88	−0.32
Fishing Party	1. Bob Smith; 2. Elizabeth Stocker	20,290	0.84	−0.44
Fishing and Lifestyle	1. Kevin Collins; 2. Dave Donald	19,131	0.79	+0.79
What Women Want	1. Anne Bousfield; 2. Sonya Beutel	17,370	0.72	+0.72
Shooters	1. Paul Feeney; 2. Allen Hrstich	12,845	0.53	+0.53
Climate Change	1. Phil Johnson; 2. Steve Posselt	8,818	0.36	+0.36
Democratic Labor	1. Noel Jackson; 2. Brian Dowling	7265	0.30	+0.30
Christian Democrats	1. Linda Brice; 2. Malcolm Brice	6,289	0.26	+0.26
Carers Alliance	1. Felicity Maddison; 2. Robert Gow	4,822	0.20	+0.20
One Nation	1. Ian Nelson; 2. Lew Arroita	4,174	0.17	−2.97
Liberty & Democracy	1. John Humphreys; 2. Joseph Clark	3,890	0.16	+0.16
Socialist Alliance	1. Sam Watson; 2. Amelia Taylor	1,941	0.08	−0.02
FreeMatilda	1. Richard Hackett-Jones; 2. John Rivett	1,738	0.07	+0.07
Group X	1. James Baker; 2. Louise Fitzgerald-Baker	1,506	0.06	+0.06
Non-Custodial Parents	1. Bill Healey; 2. Doug Thompson	1,390	0.06	−0.13
Senator On-Line	1. Ben Peake; 2. Sharon Bateson	1,251	0.05	+0.05
Citizens Electoral Council	1. Jan Pukallus; 2. Maurice Hetherington	1,155	0.05	−0.10
Group N	1. David Couper; 2. Michael Brown	826	0.03	+0.03
Secular	1. Katrina Alberts; 2. Martin Rady	493	0.02	+0.02
Independent	John Duggan	406	0.02	+0.02
Independent	Robin Petersen	198	0.01	+0.01
Independent	Leo DeMarchi	144	0.01	+0.01
Independent	James Reid	70	0.00	+0.00
Independent	Marsileo Traversari	52	0.00	+0.00
Independent	Pilly Low	25	0.00	+0.00
Total formal votes		2,418,907	97.66	+0.45
Informal votes		57,912	2.34	−0.45
Turnout		2,476,819	94.81	+0.68

The Coalition narrowly finished ahead of Labor on primary vote with around 40% each. The Greens finished with over 7% and Pauline's United Australia party with over 4%. The Coalition and Labor both won 2 seats each on primary vote alone. Preferences from the Democrats allowed the Greens to narrowly go ahead of Labor. Family first preferences were enough for Nationals candidate Ron Boswell to be re-elected and win a third seat for the Coalition. Pauline's United Australia party directed preferences to Labor which allowed them to win the final seat. The final result was three seats each to Labor and the Coalition.

==== 2004 ====
Elected	#	Senator	Party
2004	1	Brett Mason	Liberal
2004	2	Jan McLucas	Labor
2004	3	George Brandis	Liberal
2004	4	Joe Ludwig	Labor
2004	5	Barnaby Joyce	National
2004	3	Russell Trood	Liberal
2001
2001	1	Ian Macdonald	Liberal
2001	2	John Hogg	Labor
2001	3	Santo Santoro	Liberal
2001	4	Claire Moore	Labor
2001	5	Andrew Bartlett	Democrats
2001	6	Ron Boswell	National

2004 Australian federal election: Senate, Queensland
Party	Candidate	Votes	%	±%
Quota		323,611		
Liberal	1. Brett Mason (elected 1); 2. George Brandis (elected 3); 3. Russell Trood (elected 6); 4. Sue Boyce	867,276	38.29	+3.39
Labor	1. Jan McLucas (elected 2); 2. Joe Ludwig (elected 4); 3. Frank Gilbert	717,005	36.12	−0.08
National	1. Barnaby Joyce (elected 5); 2. James Baker; 3. Stewart Gillies	149,719	6.61	−2.55
Greens	1. Drew Hutton; 2. Sarah Moles; 3. Theresa Millard	122,393	5.40	+2.09
Group K	1. Pauline Hanson; 2. Judy Smith	102,824	4.54	+4.54
Family First	1. John Lewis; 2. Tracy Skellern-Smith	76,309	3.37	+3.37
One Nation	1. Len Harris; 2. Ian Nelson; 3. James Savage	71,043	3.14	−6.88
Democrats	1. John Cherry; 2. Bonny Bauer	49,898	2.20	−4.49
Fishing Party	1. Kevin Collins; 2. Darryl Whitford	29,034	1.28	+1.28
Liberals for Forests	1. Joseph Clark; 2. Archie Chapman	22,283	0.98	+0.98
HEMP	1. Guy Freemarijuana; 2. Tony Kneipp	17,485	0.77	−0.54
Group O	1. Hetty Johnston; 2. Diana Scott	15,596	0.69	+0.69
Group A	1. Terry Rushton; 2. Eamon Coll	5,152	0.23	+0.23
Non-Custodial Parents	1. Geoff Webster; 2. Doug Thompson	4,226	0.19	+0.19
Citizens Electoral Council	1. Maurice Hetherington; 2. Ray Gillham	3,359	0.15	+0.05
New Country	1. Lorraine Wheeldon; 2. Rowell Walton	2,841	0.13	+0.13
Socialist Alliance	1. Sam Watson; 2. Nicole Clevens	2,334	0.10	+0.10
Great Australians	1. John Rivett; 2. Mal McKenzie	2,293	0.10	+0.10
Group D	1. Selwyn Johnston; 2. Susan Harvey	1,408	0.06	+0.06
Group G	1. Gail Duncan; 2. Kim McIntosh	1,015	0.04	+0.04
Progressive Alliance	1. Tony Newman; 2. Darrell Morris	921	0.04	+0.04
Independent	Darryl McArthur	568	0.03	+0.03
Independent	Hassan Ghulam	295	0.01	+0.01
Total formal votes		2,265,274	97.21	+0.16
Informal votes		65,037	2.79	−0.16
Turnout		2,330,311	94.13	−1.10

Primary votes saw two Labor and two Liberal senators get elected, leaving the Liberal Party well ahead of the National Party, the Greens and former One Nation leader Pauline Hanson, who this election ran as an independent. Pauline Hanson attracted a lot of preferential votes, which meant that her former party was surprisingly excluded before she was. This meant that her preferences could not go to One Nation and threaten the Liberal and National parties. As such, the National Party, using Fishing Party preferences, won the fifth seat and the Liberals won the sixth seat. The result was three seats Liberal, two seats Labor and one seat National.

==== 2001 ====
Elected	#	Senator	Party
2001	1	Ian Macdonald	Liberal
2001	2	John Hogg	Labor
2001	3	John Herron	Liberal
2001	4	Claire Moore	Labor
2001	5	Andrew Bartlett	Democrats
2001	6	Ron Boswell	National
1998
1998	1	Jan McLucas	Labor
2000*	2	George Brandis	Liberal
1999†	3	Len Harris	One Nation
1998	4	Joe Ludwig	Labor
1998	5	Brett Mason	Liberal
2001‡	6	John Cherry	Democrats

2001 Australian federal election: Senate, Queensland
Party	Candidate	Votes	%	±%
Quota		307,154		
Liberal	1. Ian Macdonald (elected 1); 2. John Herron (elected 3); 3. Russell Trood; 4. Deborah Kember	750,416	34.90	+9.0
Labor	1. John Hogg (elected 2); 2. Claire Moore (elected 4); 3. Brenda Gibbs	682,239	31.73	−0.9
One Nation	1. Pauline Hanson; 2. Trevor Hansen; 3. Morrie Marsden; 4. John Slack-Smith	215,400	10.02	−4.8
National	1. Ron Boswell (elected 6); 2. Pam Stallman; 3. Barnaby Joyce	196,845	9.16	−0.3
Democrats	1. Andrew Bartlett (elected 5); 2. Liz Oss-Emer; 3. Megan Bathurst	143,942	6.69	−1.0
Greens	1. Sarah Moles; 2. Desiree Mahoney; 3. Mark Taylor	71,102	3.31	+1.2
HEMP	1. Nigel Freemarijuana; 2. Guy Freemarijuana	28,122	1.31	+1.3
No GST	1. David Ettridge; 2. Richard Gooch	24,319	1.13	−1.0
Christian Democrats	1. Kerry Blackman; 2. Geoffrey Bullock	22,703	1.06	−0.3
Group A	1. Sam Watson; 2. Karen Fletcher	8,553	0.40	+0.40
Republican	1. John Pyke; 2. Malcolm Simpson	2,553	0.12	+0.1
Citizens Electoral Council	1. Danny Hope; 2. Nick Contarino	2,226	0.10	+0.10
Independent	Derek Rosborough	700	0.03	+0.03
Independent	Phillip Riley	263	0.01	+0.01
Independent	George Szentes	180	0.01	+0.01
Independent	Oni Kirwin	173	0.01	+0.01
Independent	Anthony Melrose	105	0.01	+0.01
Independent	John Jones	86	0.01	+0.01
Independent	David Howse	78	0.01	+0.01
Independent	Walter Philippi	72	0.01	+0.01
Total formal votes		2,150,077	97.05	+0.09
Informal votes		65,450	2.95	−0.09
Turnout		2,215,527	95.23	+0.33

=== Elections in the 1990s ===
==== 1998 ====
Elected	#	Senator	Party
1998
1998	1	Jan McLucas	Labor
1998	2	Warwick Parer	Liberal
1998	3	Heather Hill	One Nation
1998	4	Joe Ludwig	Labor
1998	5	Brett Mason	Liberal
1998	6	John Woodley	Democrats
1996
1996	1	Ian Macdonald	Liberal
1996	2	John Hogg	Labor
1996	3	Ron Boswell	National
1996	4	John Herron	Liberal
1996	5	Brenda Gibbs	Labor
1996	6	Andrew Bartlett	Democrats

1998 Australian federal election: Senate, Queensland
Party	Candidate	Votes	%	±%
Quota		286,245		
Labor	1. Jan McLucas (elected 1); 2. Joe Ludwig (elected 4); 3. Jann Piasecki	654,623	32.7	+2.3
Liberal	1. Warwick Parer (elected 2); 2. Brett Mason (elected 5); 3. David MacGibbon; 4. Deborah Kember	570,692	28.5	−6.9
One Nation	1. Heather Hill (elected 3); 2. Len Harris; 3. Sue Gordon; 4. David Anning; 5. Barry Evans	297,245	14.9	+14.9
National	1. Bill O'Chee; 2. Thomas Bradley; 3. Teresa Cobb	190,662	9.5	−5.5
Democrats	1. John Woodley (elected 6); 2. John Cherry; 3. Megan Bathurst	156,451	7.8	−5.4
Greens	1. Drew Hutton; 2. Desiree Mahoney; 3. Chris Gwin	42,264	2.1	−0.3
Christian Democrats	1. John Bradford; 2. Kerry Blackman; 3. Judy McKenzie	28,826	1.4	+0.9
Queensland First	1. David Colston; 2. Dawn Colston	11,554	0.6	+0.6
Unity	1. Harry Fong; 2. Chris Toogood	9,487	0.5	+0.5
Women's Party	1. Mary Kelly; 2. Jenny Hughey	9,103	0.5	−0.2
One Australia	1. Mario Zocchi; 2. Ray Buckley	7,572	0.4	+0.2
Abolish Child Support	1. Bruce the Family; 2. Steve Southall	4,905	0.2	+0.2
Australia First	1. Eric Nagle; 2. Klaus Duke	4,897	0.2	+0.2
Democratic Socialist	1. Andy Gianniotis; 2. Coral Wynter	4,394	0.2	+0.2
Family Law Reform	1. Barry Weedon; 2. Robyn Somers	2,326	0.1	+0.1
Reform	1. Brenda Moloney; 2. Terry Fleming	2,011	0.1	+0.1
Citizens Electoral Council	1. Maurice Hetherington; 2. Ray Gillham	1,785	0.1	+0.1
Natural Law	1. Geoff Wilson; 2. Dorothy McKenzie	1,782	0.1	+0.1
Group B	1. Jan Linsley; 2. Percy Meredith	941	0.0	0.0
Group C	1. Noel Payne; 2. Jim Pavier	685	0.0	0.0
Group S	1. Selwyn Johnston; 2. Aaron Johnston	661	0.0	0.0
Independent	Michelle MacNevin	484	0.0	0.0
Independent	Kenny Dalton	147	0.0	0.0
Independent	Bryan Peach	141	0.0	0.0
Independent	Terry Sharples	51	0.0	0.0
Independent	Doug Hodgetts	21	0.0	0.0
Total formal votes		2,003,710	97.0	+0.3
Informal votes		62,754	3.0	−0.3
Turnout		2,066,464	94.9	−0.2

==== 1996 ====
Elected	#	Senator	Party
1996
1996	1	Ian Macdonald	Liberal
1996	2	John Hogg	Labor
1996	3	Ron Boswell	National
1996	4	John Herron	Liberal
1996	5	Brenda Gibbs	Labor
1996	6	Cheryl Kernot	Democrats
1993
1993	1	Margaret Reynolds	Labor
1993	2	David MacGibbon	Liberal
1993	3	Bill O'Chee	National
1993	4	Mal Colston	Labor
1993	5	John Herron	Liberal
1993	6	John Woodley	Democrats

1996 Australian federal election: Senate, Queensland
Party	Candidate	Votes	%	±%
Quota		274,924		
Liberal	1. Ian Macdonald (elected 1); 2. John Herron (elected 4); 3. Debbie Kember	680,553	35.4	+3.9
Labor	1. John Hogg (elected 2); 2. Brenda Gibbs (elected 5); 3. Bernadette Callaghan	583,850	30.3	−9.1
National	1. Ron Boswell (elected 3); 2. Teresa Cobb; 3. Terry Cranwell	288,199	15.0	+0.5
Democrats	1. Cheryl Kernot (elected 6); 2. Tony Walters; 3. Peter Collins; 4. Annette Reed	254,219	13.2	+6.2
Greens	1. Angela Jones; 2. Desiree Mahoney; 3. Libby Connors	46,285	2.4	−0.8
AAFI	1. Cynthia Mayne; 2. John Minogue	13,117	0.7	+0.7
Women's Party	1. Mary Kelly; 2. Lizbeth Yuille; 3. Jenny Hughey	13,006	0.7	+0.7
Shooters	1. Peter Salisbury; 2. Bill Ison	12,146	0.6	+0.6
Call to Australia	1. Harry Cook; 2. Nan Cook	9,543	0.5	−0.1
Group G	1. J Freemarijuana; 2. Tony Kneipp	3,836	0.2	+0.2
Natural Law	1. Kris Ayyar; 2. John Price	3,656	0.2	0.0
One Australia	1. Perry Jewell; 2. Michael Grayson	3,638	0.2	+0.2
Group F	1. Phillip Young; 2. Harvie Ladlow	2,793	0.1	+0.1
Indigenous Peoples	1. Sam Watson; 2. Netta Tyson	2,772	0.1	+0.1
Republican	1. Brian Buckley; 2. David Bailey	2,683	0.1	+0.1
Group H	1. Ian McNiven; 2. Ray Smyth; 3. Robert Marks	1,909	0.1	+0.1
Group M	1. Maurice Hetherington; 2. Ross Russell	738	0.0	0.0
Group E	1. John Jones; 2. Lee Jones	613	0.0	0.0
Independent	Michelle Mac Nevin	594	0.0	0.0
Independent	Ross McKay	154	0.0	0.0
Independent	David Howse	91	0.0	0.0
Independent	Chris Leth	67	0.0	0.0
Total formal votes		1,924,462	96.7	−1.3
Informal votes		64,979	3.3	+1.3
Turnout		1,989,441	95.1	−0.7

==== 1993 ====
Elected	#	Senator	Party
1993	1	Margaret Reynolds	Labor
1993	2	David MacGibbon	Liberal
1993	3	Bill O'Chee	National
1993	4	Mal Colston	Labor
1993	5	Warwick Parer	Liberal
1993	6	John Woodley	Democrats
1990	1	Gerry Jones	Labor
1990	2	Ian Macdonald	Liberal
1990	3	Gerry Jones	Labor
1990	4	John Herron	Liberal
1990	5	Ron Boswell	National
1990	6	Cheryl Kernot	Democrats

1993 Australian federal election: Senate, Queensland
Party	Candidate	Votes	%	±%
Quota		264,381		
Labor	1. Margaret Reynolds (elected 1); 2. Mal Colston (elected 4); 3. John Bird; 4. Ian McLean	729,265	39.4	+0.3
Liberal	1. David MacGibbon (elected 2); 2. Warwick Parer (elected 5); 3. Ross Cunningham; 4. Ann Buchanan; 5. Henry Bird; 6. Owen Davies	582,766	31.5	+2.2
National	1. Bill O'Chee (elected 3); 2. De-Anne Kelly; 3. Teresa Cobb	268,809	14.5	+0.9
Democrats	1. John Woodley (elected 6); 2. Jonathan Cornish; 3. Gayle Woodrow; 4. Tony Walters	130,405	7.1	−5.4
Greens	1. Drew Hutton; 2. Colin Hunt; 3. Naomi Spencer	59,303	3.2	+3.2
Confederate Action	1. Perry Jewell; 2. Tony Pitt; 3. Sandra Hill; 4. Mark Geissmann; 5. Ryland Gill; 6. Richard Teague	52,942	2.9	+2.9
Call to Australia	1. Alan Sims; 2. Rona Joyner	11,546	0.6	−0.5
Indigenous Peoples	1. Darby McCarthy; 2. Una Branfield	6,422	0.3	+0.3
Natural Law	1. Geoff Wilson; 2. Peter Jackson	3,575	0.2	+0.2
Group E	1. Barry Weedon; 2. Margaret Crompton	2,030	0.1	+0.1
Group H	1. Ronald Alford; 2. Sylvia Smith	1,272	0.1	+0.1
Independent	Steve Dimitriou	1,043	0.1	+0.1
Citizens Electoral Council	John Koehler	538	0.0	0.0
Citizens Electoral Council	Julie Warner	254	0.0	0.0
Independent	Joe Sherlock	236	0.0	0.0
Independent	Barry Garvey	150	0.0	0.0
Independent	Christopher Beilby	105	0.0	0.0
Total formal votes		1,850,661	98.0	+0.5
Informal votes		38,491	2.0	−0.5
Turnout		1,889,152	95.8	+0.7

==== 1990 ====
Elected	#	Senator	Party
1990
1990	1	Gerry Jones	Labor
1990	2	Ian Macdonald	Liberal
1990	3	Bryant Burns	Labor
1990	4	John Herron	Liberal
1990	5	Ron Boswell	National
1990	6	Cheryl Kernot	Democrats
1987
1987	1	Margaret Reynolds	Labor
1987	2	Flo Bjelke-Petersen	National
1987	3	David MacGibbon	Liberal
1987	4	Mal Colston	Labor
1987	5	Bill O'Chee	National
1987	6	Warwick Parer	Liberal

1990 Australian federal election: Senate, Queensland
Party	Candidate	Votes	%	±%
Quota		239,121		
Labor	1. Gerry Jones (elected 1); 2. Bryant Burns (elected 3); 3. John Black; 4. Greg Vicary	653,070	39.0	−3.0
Liberal	1. Ian Macdonald (elected 2); 2. John Herron (elected 4); 3. Carmel Draper	490,523	29.3	+11.3
National	1. Ron Boswell (elected 5); 2. Glen Sheil; 3. Beth Honeycombe; 4. Jim Mason	227,696	13.6	−15.1
Democrats	1. Cheryl Kernot (elected 6); 2. Tony Walters; 3. Brian Stockwell; 4. John Brown	209,030	12.5	+5.0
Environment Inds	1. Peter James; 2. John Jones	30,967	1.8	+1.8
Democratic Socialist	1. Maurice Sibelle; 2. Karen Fletcher	26,300	1.6	+1.6
Call to Australia	1. Rona Joyner; 2. Wilfred Blake; 3. Bernice King; 4. Ross Maclean	18,469	1.1	+1.1
Grey Power	1. Ron Alford; 2. Felix Cernovs	9,237	0.5	+0.5
Conservative	1. Sydney Volker; 2. Loraine Morrison	4,414	0.3	+0.3
Group F	1. Barry Weedon; 2. Margaret Crompton	2,564	0.1	+0.1
Independent	Vincent Burke	946	0.1	+0.1
Independent	Steve Demetriou	613	0.0	0.0
Independent	Clemens Vermeulen	250	0.0	0.0
Independent	Mark Cresswell	117	0.0	0.0
Total formal votes		1,674,196	97.5	+0.6
Informal votes		42,112	2.5	−0.6
Turnout		1,716,308	95.1	+2.6

=== Elections in the 1980s ===
==== 1987 ====
1987 Australian federal election: Senate, Queensland
Party	Candidate	Votes	%	±%
Quota		117,721		
Labor	1. Margaret Reynolds (elected 1); 2. Mal Colston (elected 4); 3. Gerry Jones (elected 7); 4. John Black (elected 9); 5. Bryant Burns (elected 10); 6. Jack Camp; 7. Glenevie Jensen	643,094	42.0	+2.3
National	1. Flo Bjelke-Petersen (elected 2); 2. John Stone (elected 5); 3. Ron Boswell (elected 8); 4. Glen Sheil (elected 12); 5. George Cowan; 6. Vicky Kippin; 7. Ann Garms; 8. Bruce Laming	439,618	28.7	−0.2
Liberal	1. David MacGibbon (elected 3); 2. Warwick Parer (elected 6); 3. Gary Neat; 4. Cassie Solomon; 5. Brian Taylor; 6. Jane Williamson	275,085	18.0	+0.6
Democrats	1. Michael Macklin (elected 11); 2. Cheryl Kernot; 3. Norman Johnson; 4. Anthony Walters	115,456	7.5	−1.7
Independent	George Georges	26,795	1.8	+1.8
Nuclear Disarmament	1. John Jones; 2. Brian Dunsford	17,411	1.1	−3.3
Group A	1. Barry Weedon; 2. Kathleen Wacker	6,692	0.4	+0.4
Independent	Ron Smith	3,410	0.2	+0.2
Unite Australia	1. Ron Alford; 2. Geoff Fawthrop	1,638	0.1	+0.1
Group C	1. Ray Ferguson; 2. Jake Haub	737	0.0	0.0
Independent	John Bolt	424	0.0	0.0
Total formal votes		1,530,360	96.9	−0.1
Informal votes		49,609	3.1	+0.1
Turnout		1,579,969	92.5	−0.9

#	Senator	Party
1	Margaret Reynolds	Labor
2	Flo Bjelke-Petersen	National
3	David MacGibbon	Liberal
4	Mal Colston	Labor
5	John Stone	National
6	Warwick Parer	Liberal
7	Gerry Jones	Labor
8	Ron Boswell	National
9	John Black	Labor
10	Bryant Burns	Labor
11	Michael Macklin	Democrats
12	Glen Sheil	National

==== 1984 ====
Elected	#	Senator	Party
1985
1985	1	Margaret Reynolds	Labor
1985	2	Ron Boswell	National
1985	3	David MacGibbon	Liberal
1985	4	Gerry Jones	Labor
1985	5	Glen Sheil	National
1985	6	John Black	Labor
1985	7	Michael Macklin	Democrats
1982
1982	1	George Georges	Labor
1982	2	Flo Bjelke-Petersen	National
1982	3	Warwick Parer	Liberal
1982	4	Mal Colston	Labor
1982	5	Stan Collard	National

1984 Australian federal election: Senate, Queensland
Party	Candidate	Votes	%	±%
Quota		176,095		
Labor	1. Margaret Reynolds (elected 1); 2. Gerry Jones (elected 4); 3. John Black (elected 6); 4. Bryant Burns	558,623	39.7	+0.1
National	1. Ron Boswell (elected 2); 2. Glen Sheil (elected 5); 3. Patrick Behan; 4. Alan Metcalfe	406,829	28.9	−0.2
Liberal	1. David MacGibbon (elected 3); 2. William Everingham; 3. Olive-Orme Scott-Young; 4. Christopher Gilbert; 5. Maurice Thomson	244,753	17.4	+2.5
Democrats	1. Michael Macklin (elected 7); 2. Ray Hollis; 3. John Elfick; 4. Cheryl Kernot	129,636	9.2	+1.3
Nuclear Disarmament	1. Patsy Goodwin; 2. Bernard Hockings	62,102	4.4	+4.4
Conservative	1. Fast Bucks; 2. Peter Livesey	4,731	0.3	+0.3
Group B	1. Hugh Bruce; 2. Michael Carr	1,317	0.1	+0.1
Independent	Frank Bologna	335	0.0	0.0
Independent	Raymond Medwin	207	0.0	0.0
Independent	Norman Eather	94	0.0	0.0
Independent	Cyril McKenzie	86	0.0	0.0
Independent	Dietar Soegemeier	39	0.0	0.0
Total formal votes		1,408,752	97.0	+5.6
Informal votes		43,919	3.0	−5.6
Turnout		1,452,671	93.4	+0.8

==== 1983 ====
1983 Australian federal election: Senate, Queensland
Party	Candidate	Votes	%	±%
Quota		113,393		
Labor	1. George Georges (elected 1); 2. Mal Colston (elected 4); 3. Gerry Jones (elected 6); 4. Margaret Reynolds (elected 8); 5. Robert Gleeson; 6. Susan Yarrow	493,424	39.6	+1.1
National	1. Flo Bjelke-Petersen (elected 2); 2. Stan Collard (elected 5); 3. Ron Boswell (elected 7); 4. Patrick Behan	363,462	29.1	+2.3
Liberal	1. Kathy Martin (elected 3); 2. David MacGibbon (elected 10); 3. Edi Solari; 4. David Watson	187,495	15.0	−8.0
Democrats	1. Michael Macklin (elected 9); 2. Stanley Stanley; 3. Gilruth Rees; 4. Anthony Walters; 5. Allan Holz	98,997	7.9	−2.1
Group I	1. Neville Bonner; 2. Audrey Pengelis	83,502	6.7	+6.7
Progress	1. Vivian Forbes; 2. Jill Weil	10,787	0.9	+0.9
Christian Voice	1. John Herzog; 2. Tass Augustakis; 3. John Carlisle	3,113	0.2	+0.2
Integrity Team	1. Victor Bridger; 2. Michael Comerford; 3. Alan Ellis	1,963	0.1	+0.1
Independent	John Fitzgerald	1,517	0.1	+0.1
Party to Expose the Petrov Conspiracy	1. Cyril McKenzie; 2. Vynette McKenzie	775	0.0	0.0
Independent	Milan Lorman	599	0.0	0.0
Humanitarian	1. Derek Gillmore; 2. Marcus Platen	569	0.0	0.0
Socialist Workers	1. Jonathan West; 2. John Coleman	534	0.0	0.0
Independent	Francis Ross	161	0.0	0.0
Independent	Norman Eather	94	0.0	0.0
Independent	Ivan Harris	80	0.0	0.0
Independent	Estelle Cattoni	56	0.0	0.0
Total formal votes		1,247,321	91.4	+0.6
Informal votes		116,858	8.6	−0.6
Turnout		1,364,179	92.6	−1.4

#	Senator	Party
1	George Georges	Labor
2	Flo Bjelke-Petersen	National
3	Kathy Martin	Liberal
4	Mal Colston	Labor
5	Stan Collard	National
6	Gerry Jones	Labor
7	Ron Boswell	National
8	Margaret Reynolds	Labor
9	Michael Macklin	Democrat
10	David MacGibbon	Liberal

==== 1980 ====
Elected	#	Senator	Party
1981
1981	1	Jim Keeffe	Labor
1981	2	Flo Bjelke-Petersen	NCP
1981	3	Neville Bonner	Liberal
1981	4	Gerry Jones	Labor
1981	5	Michael Macklin	Democrat
1978
1978	1	Kathy Sullivan	Liberal
1978	2	George Georges	Labor
1978	3	Stan Collard	NCP
1978	4	Mal Colston	Labor
1978	5	David MacGibbon	Liberal

1980 Australian federal election: Senate: Queensland
Party	Candidate	Votes	%	±%
Quota		192,889		
Labor	1. Jim Keeffe (elected 1); 2. Gerry Jones (elected 4); 3. Robert Gleeson	445,277	38.5	+3.9
National Country	1. Flo Bjelke-Petersen (elected 2); 2. Glen Sheil; 3. Ron Maunsell	309,622	26.8	+26.8*
Liberal	1. Neville Bonner (elected 3); 2. Yvonne McComb; 3. Franz Born	266,407	23.0	+23.0*
Democrats	1. Michael Macklin (elected 5); 2. William Elson-Green; 3. Gilruth Rees	115,429	10.0	+1.0
Progress	1. Vivian Forbes; 2. Frank Paull	3,399	0.3	−0.5
Group J	1. Lionel Fifield; 2. Robert McClintock	3,256	0.3	+0.3
Group F	1. John Butler; 2. Anne Glew	3,022	0.3	+0.3
Socialist	1. David Ryan; 2. Stephen Bulloch; 3. Ivan Ivanoff	2,514	0.2	−2.6
Independent	Norman Eather	2,191	0.2	+0.2
Group G	1. Sydney Shawcross; 2. Cyril McKenzie; 3. Michael Dendle	2,102	0.2	+0.2
National Front	1. Rosemary Sisson; 2. Victor Robb	1,467	0.1	+0.1
Independent	Carlemo Wacando	1,326	0.1	+0.1
Group H	1. James Drabsch; 2. Vivien Botterill	513	0.0	0.0
Independent	Neil McKay	369	0.0	0.0
Independent	Anthony Catip	241	0.0	0.0
Independent	Frederick Phillips	195	0.0	0.0
Total formal votes		1,157,330	90.8	−1.2
Informal votes		117,884	9.2	+1.2
Turnout		1,275,214	94.0	−0.8

- The Liberal and Country parties contested the previous election as a Coalition, where they obtained 51.3% of the vote. In this election, they contested the election as separate parties.

=== Elections in the 1960s ===
==== 1966 ====
1966 Australian federal election: Senate special, Queensland
Party	Candidate	Votes	%	±%
Quota		417,438		
Liberal	Bill Heatley (re-elected)	426,726	51.11	
Labor	Bertie Milliner	328,289	39.32	
Democratic Labor	Rogers Judge	62,870	7.53	
Independent	Ian Kent	16,989	2.03	
Total formal votes		834,874	97.32	
Informal votes		22,956	2.68	
Turnout		857,830	95.26	

=== Elections in the 1910s ===
==== 1914 ====
Each elector voted for up to six candidates. Percentages refer to the number of voters rather than the number of votes.

1914 Australian federal election: Senate, Queensland
Party	Candidate	Votes	%	±%
Labor	Thomas Givens (re-elected 1)	152,990	57.8	+7.0 (Note: Change compared to the personal vote at the 1910 election.)
Labor	Myles Ferricks (re-elected 2)	152,469	57.6	+2.8 (Note: Change compared to the personal vote at the 1913 election.)
Labor	William Maughan (re-elected 3)	152,321	57.5	+2.8
Labor	James Stewart (re-elected 4)	151,553	57.3	+7.6
Labor	John Mullan (re-elected 5)	150,703	56.9	+6.4
Labor	Harry Turley (re-elected 6)	150,703	56.9	+6.4
Liberal	Thomas Crawford	114,652	43.3	
Liberal	William Aitchison	113,317	42.8	
Liberal	Frederick Johnson	113,230	42.8	
Liberal	Adolphus Jones	112,640	42.6	
Liberal	Edward Smith	111,766	42.2	
Liberal	Michael O'Donnell	111,396	42.1	
Total formal votes		1,588,266; 264,711 voters	95.77	+0.90
Informal votes		11,693	4.23	−0.90
Turnout		276,404	75.07	+1.77
Party total votes
Labor		911,265	57.37	+3.19
Liberal		677,001	42.63	−3.19

==== 1913 ====
Each elector voted for up to three candidates. Percentages refer to the number of voters rather than the number of votes.

1913 Australian federal election: Senate, Queensland
Party	Candidate	Votes	%	±%
Labour	William Maughan (elected 1)	145,477	54.7	
Labour	John Mullan (elected 2)	143,700	54.0	
Labour	Myles Ferricks (elected 3)	143,416	53.9	
Liberal	Thomas Chataway (defeated)	123,621	46.5	−5.3 (Note: Change compared to the personal vote at the 1906 election.)
Liberal	Robert Sayers (defeated)	121,780	45.8	−4.4
Liberal	Anthony St Ledger (defeated)	121,372	45.2	−4.0
Total formal votes		798,366; 266,122 voters	94.9	+0.1
Informal votes		14,403	−0.1	
Turnout		280,525	77.3	+16.1
Party total votes
Labour		432,593	54.2	+3.9
Liberal		365,773	45.8	−1.8

==== 1910 ====
Each elector voted for up to three candidates. Percentages refer to the number of voters rather than the number of votes.

1910 Australian federal election: Senate, Queensland
Party	Candidate	Votes	%	±%
Labour	Thomas Givens (re-elected 1)	82,234	50.8	−1.0 (Note: Change compared to the personal vote at the 1903 election.)
Labour	Harry Turley (re-elected 2)	81,719	50.5	−4.6
Labour	James Stewart (re-elected 3)	80,339	49.7	−3.8
Liberal	Thomas Glassey	77,895	48.1	
Liberal	Hugh Macrossan	77,367	47.8	
Liberal	Joe Millican	75,707	46.8	
Independent	William Kellett	6,065	3.7	
Independent	Horace Ransome	4,014	2.5	
Total formal votes		485,340; 161,780 voters	94.8	+0.7
Informal votes		8,854	5.2	−0.7
Turnout		170,634	61.2	+15.3
Party total votes
Labour		244,292	50.3	+8.3
Liberal		230,969	47.6	−2.8 (Note: Change compared to the combined Anti-Socialist and Protectionist vote at the 1906 election.)
Independent		10,079	2.1	

=== Elections in the 1900s ===
==== 1906 ====
Each elector voted for up to three candidates. Percentages refer to the number of voters rather than the number of votes.

1906 Australian federal election: Senate, Queensland
Party	Candidate	Votes	%	±%
Anti-Socialist	Thomas Chataway (elected 1)	60,738	51.8	
Anti-Socialist	Robert Sayers (elected 2)	58,824	50.2	
Anti-Socialist	Anthony St Ledger (elected 3)	57,687	49.2	
Labour	William Higgs (defeated)	54,176	46.2	
Labour	James Griffith	46,805	39.9	
Labour	Jens Lundager	46,584	39.7	
Independent Labour	Anderson Dawson (defeated)	26,771	22.8	
Total formal votes		351,585; 117,195 voters	94.1	
Informal votes		7,344	5.9	
Turnout		124,539	45.9	
Party total votes
Anti-Socialist		177,249	50.4	
Labour		147,565	42.0	
Independent Labour		26,771	7.6	

==== 1903 ====
Each elector voted for up to three candidates. Percentages refer to the number of voters rather than the number of votes.

1903 Australian federal election: Senate, Queensland
Party	Candidate	Votes	%	±%
Labour	Harry Turley (elected 1)	66,074	55.1	
Labour	James Stewart (re-elected 2)	64,077	53.5	
Labour	Thomas Givens (elected 3)	62,088	51.8	
Liberal	Walter Tunbridge	47,927	40.0	
Liberal	John Bartholomew	47,081	39.2	
Liberal	John Murray	41,719	34.8	
Ind. Protectionist	Thomas Glassey (defeated)	30,720	25.6	
Total formal votes		359,623; 119,895 voters	96.3	
Informal votes		4,612	3.7	
Turnout		124,507	54.8	
Party total votes
Labour		192,239	53.5	
Liberal		136,664	38.0	
Independent		30,720	8.5	

==== 1901 ====
Each elector voted for up to six candidates; as such percentages are shown of the total number of voters rather than the total number of votes.

There was no protectionist or free trade organisation in Queensland in 1901; the Labour Party was the only formal political party. Candidates' designations are assigned according to whether they publicly identified with the protectionist or free trade cause. Elected candidates sat with their respective parties.

1901 Australian federal election: Senate, Queensland
Party	Candidate	Votes	%	±%
Labour	William Higgs (elected 1)	29,452	62.1	+62.1
Labour	Anderson Dawson (elected 2)	29,350	61.9	+61.9
Protectionist	James Drake (elected 3)	26,552	56.0	+56.0
Labour	James Stewart (elected 4)	23,736	50.0	+50.0
Free Trade	John Ferguson (elected 5)	23,276	49.1	+49.1
Protectionist	Thomas Glassey (elected 6)	22,670	47.8	+47.8
Protectionist	Andrew Thynne	22,001	46.4	+46.4
Protectionist	John Bartholomew	20,624	43.5	+43.5
Protectionist	John Hamilton	18,680	39.4	+39.4
Protectionist	Alfred Cowley	18,265	38.5	+38.5
Protectionist	Edmund Plant	17,028	35.9	+35.9
Protectionist	Thomas Murray-Prior	13,236	27.9	+27.9
Independent	John Hoolan	7,382	15.6	+15.6
Protectionist	David Seymour	4,969	10.5	+10.5
Free Trade	Joseph Ahearne	4,516	9.5	+9.5
Protectionist	Charles Buzacott	2,918	6.2	+6.2
Total formal votes		284,655; ~47,443 ballots		
Informal votes		unknown		
Turnout		unknown		
Party total votes
Protectionist		166,943	58.6	+58.6
Labour		82,538	29.0	+29.0
Free Trade		27,792	9.8	+9.8
Independent		7,382	2.6	+2.6

== See also ==
- List of senators from Queensland
