= 1984 Australian Senate election =

Australian federal election results

1984 Australian Senate elections
- 1 December 1984

46 of the 76 seats in the Australian Senate 39 seats needed for a majority
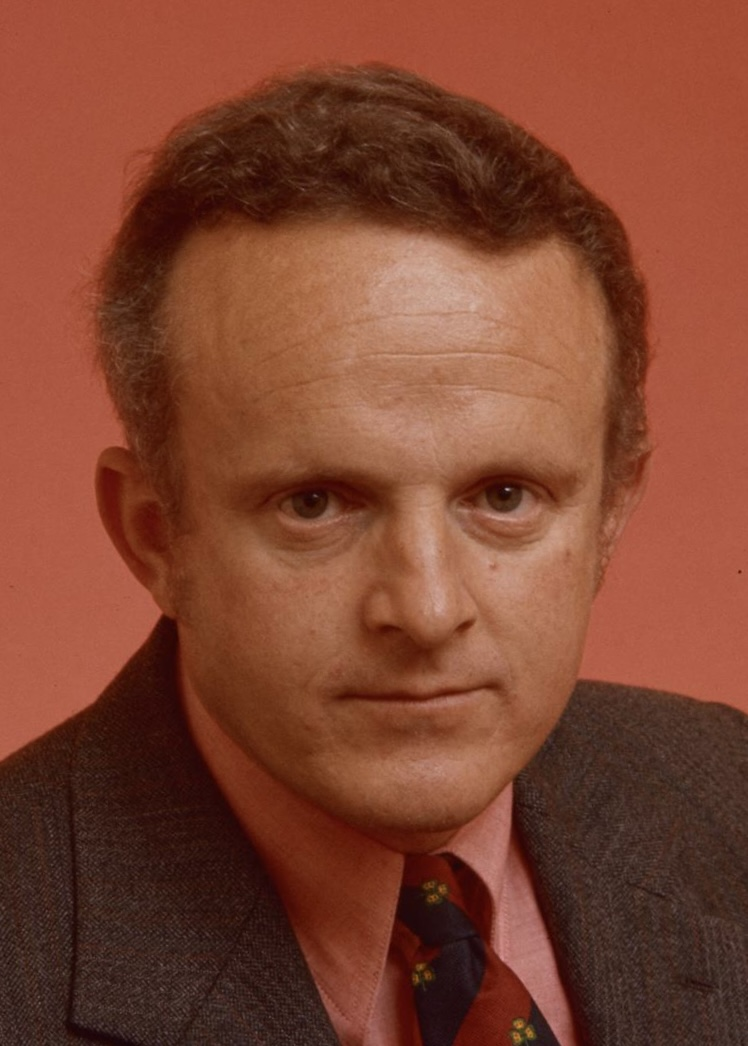

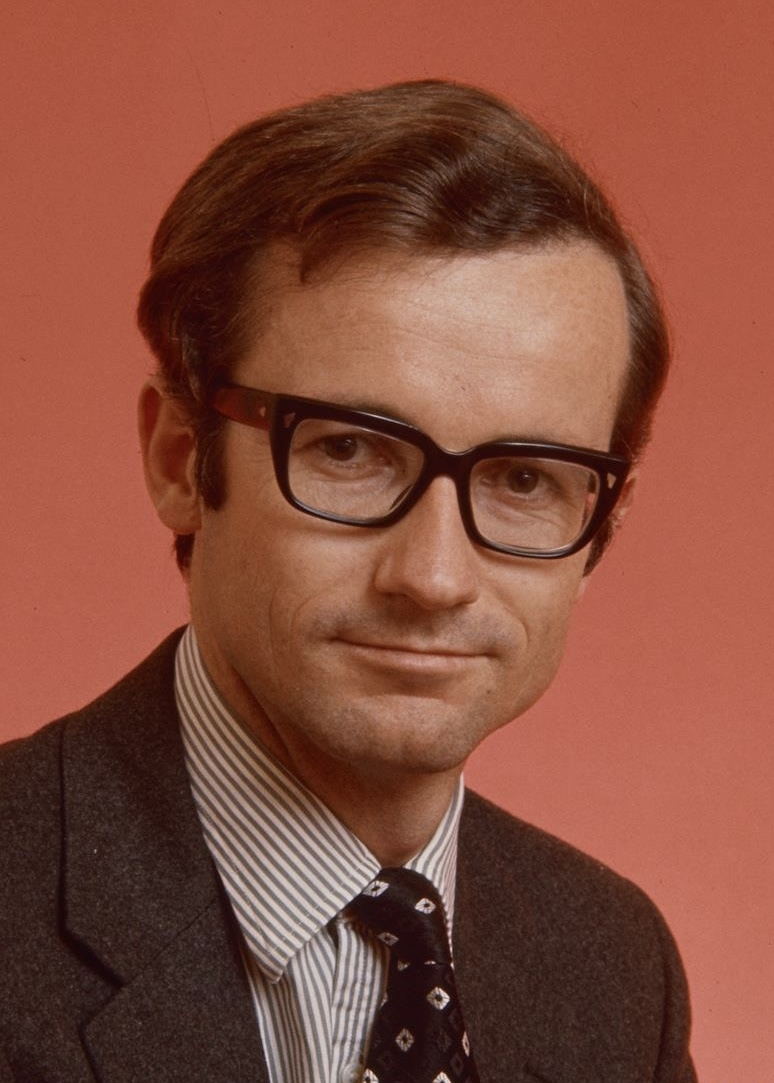

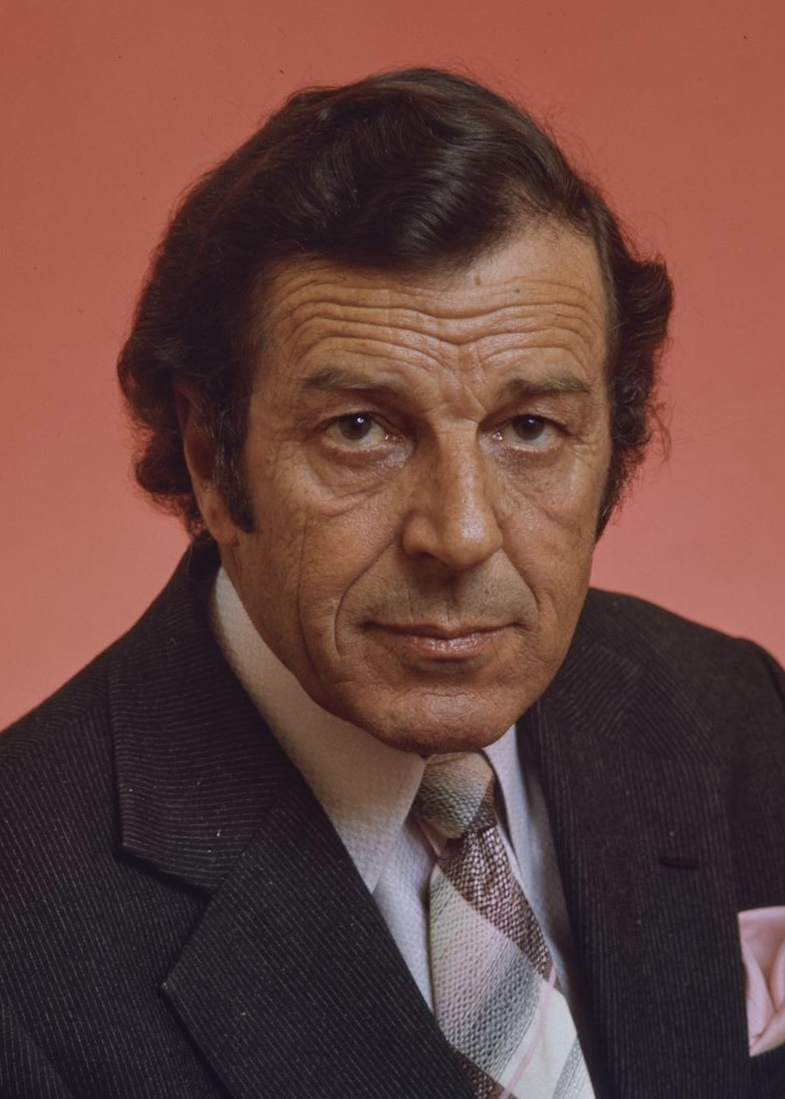

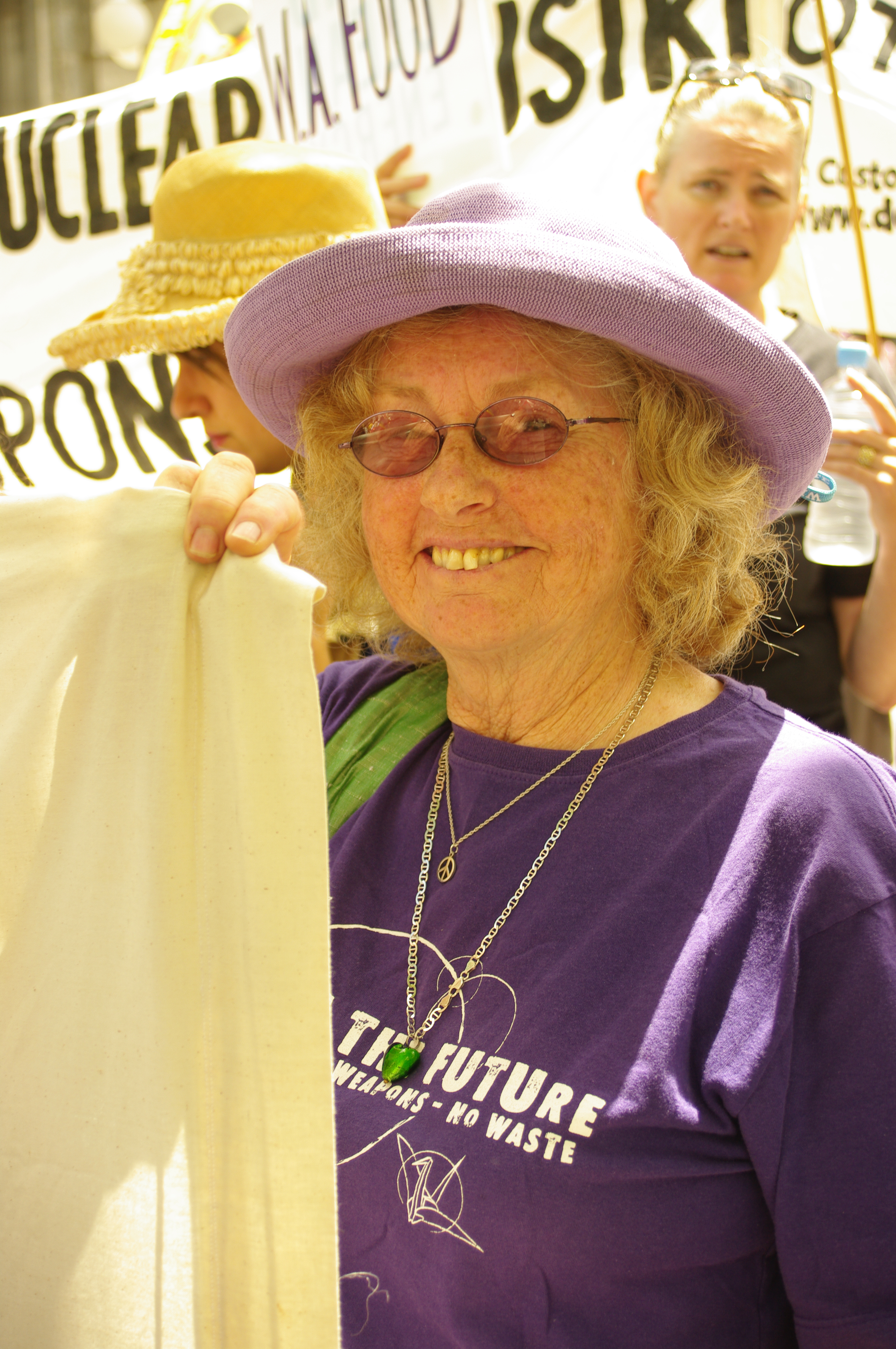
	First party	Second party
Leader	John Button	Fred Chaney
Party	Labor	Liberal–National Coalition
Leader since	7 November 1980	11 March 1983
Leader's seat	Victoria	Western Australia
Seats before	30	28
Seats won	20	20
Seats after	34	33
Seat change	▲4	▲5
Popular vote	3,750,789	3,516,857
Percentage	42.17%	39.54%
Swing	▼3.32%	▼0.41%
	Third party	Fourth party
Leader	Don Chipp	Jo Vallentine
Party	Democrats	Nuclear Disarmament
Leader since	9 May 1977	1 December 1984
Leader's seat	Victoria	Western Australia (won seat)
Seats before	5	New
Seats won	5	1
Seats after	7	1
Seat change	▲2	▲1
Popular vote	677,970	643,061
Percentage	7.62%	7.23%
Swing	▲2.32%	▲7.23%
- Senators elected in the 1984 federal election
Leader of the Senate before election
John Button
Labor
Elected Leader of the Senate
John Button
Labor

The following tables show state-by-state results in the Australian Senate at the 1984 federal election. Seven Senators were elected in each state in this election, plus two in each Territory.

Following this election, the Senate was composed of 29 coalition (27 Liberal, one coalition National, one CLP), 34 Labor, one Nuclear Disarmament Party, four non-coalition National, seven Democrats, and one Independent. Senator terms were six years (three for territories), and all took their seats immediately due to the expansion of the senate from 64 to 76 members.

As the previous election was a double dissolution, half of the senators elected at that election had their terms backdated to 1 July 1982, to end on 30 June 1988. Senator terms for those contesting this election would have been for 6 year intervals starting from 1 July 1985, but the Double dissolution election of 1987 removed this necessity.

This election was the last time that Labor won more seats than the Coalition until 2025, despite receiving more votes than them in subsequent Senate elections and winning several victories in the House of Representatives since then.

== Australia ==
Senate (STV GV) — 1984–87 – Turnout 94.55% (CV) — Informal 4.68%
Party	Votes	%	Swing	Seats won	Total seats	Change
Australian Labor Party	3,750,789	42.17	−3.32	20	34	▲4
Liberal/National joint ticket	1,130,601	12.71	−11.49	3	*	*
Liberal Party of Australia	1,831,006	20.59	+8.58	14	27	▲4
National Party of Australia	527,278	5.93	+0.87	2	5	▲1
Country Liberal Party	27,972	0.31	+0.04	1	1	Steady
Liberal/National Coalition	3,516,857	39.54	–0.41	20	33	▲5
Australian Democrats	677,970	7.62	−2.32	5	7	▲2
Nuclear Disarmament Party	643,061	7.23	*	1	1	▲1
Call to Australia Party	162,272	1.82	+0.62			
Democratic Labor	32,472	0.37	+0.37			
Pensioner	23,974	0.27	+0.27			
Harradine Group	22,992	0.26	−0.32		1	Steady
Family Movement	18,841	0.21	+0.21			
Referendum First	5,808	0.07	+0.07			
Conservative	4,731	0.05	+0.05			
Independent	34,333	0.39				
Total	8,894,100			46	76	▲12
Invalid/blank votes	437,065	4.7	–5.2			
Turnout	9,331,165	94.5				
Registered voters	9,869,217					
Source: Federal Election Results 1949-1993

== New South Wales ==
Elected	#	Senator	Party
1985
1985	1	Kerry Sibraa	Labor
1985	2	Chris Puplick	Liberal
1985	3	Bruce Childs	Labor
1985	4	David Brownhill	National
1985	5	John Morris	Labor
1985	6	Michael Baume	Liberal
1985	7	Colin Mason	Democrats
1982
1982	1	Arthur Gietzelt	Labor
1982	2	John Carrick	Liberal
1982	3	Graham Richardson	Labor
1982	4	Peter Baume	Liberal
1982	5	Doug McClelland	Labor

1984 Australian federal election: Senate, New South Wales
Party	Candidate	Votes	%	±%
Quota		381,462		
Labor	1. Kerry Sibraa (elected 1); 2. Bruce Childs (elected 3); 3. John Morris (elected 5); 4. Sue West	1,268,489	41.6	−5.7
Coalition	1. Chris Puplick (Lib) (elected 2); 2. David Brownhill (Nat) (elected 4); 3. Michael Baume (Lib) (elected 6); 4. Bronwyn Bishop (Lib); 5. Doug Moppett (Nat)	1,130,601	37.0	−1.1
Nuclear Disarmament	1. Peter Garrett; 2. Gillian Fisher; 3. Marie-Anne Hockings; 4. Russel Ward	294,772	9.7	+9.7
Democrats	1. Colin Mason (elected 7); 2. Paul McLean; 3. Jenny MacLeod; 4. Garry Chestnut	223,095	7.3	−1.3
Call to Australia	1. Graham McLennan; 2. Tom Toogood; 3. Patricia Judge; 4. Kevin Hume; 5. John Everingham; 6. Clair Isbister; 7. Elaine Nile	109,046	3.6	+0.2
Group F	1. Bill Wentworth; 2. Robert Clark; 3. Raymond King; 4. Myfanwy Young	17,530	0.6	+0.6
Group H	1. Burnum Burnum; 2. Rocky Thomas	4,331	0.1	+0.1
Independent	Helen Hibbard	1,671	0.1	+0.1
Group D	1. Henry Soper; 2. Maureen Nathan; 3. Peter Wright; 4. Archibald Brown; 5. William More; 6. John Veenstra	966	0.0	0.0
Independent	Helen Richards	634	0.0	0.0
Group G	1. Peter Consandine; 2. Brian Buckley	557	0.0	0.0
Total formal votes		3,051,692	94.4	+5.5
Informal votes		181,272	5.6	−5.5
Turnout		3,232,964	94.4	−0.5

== Victoria ==
Elected	#	Senator	Party
1985
1985	1	Olive Zakharov	Labor
1985	2	Alan Missen	Liberal
1985	3	Robert Ray	Labor
1985	4	David Hamer	Liberal
1985	5	Barney Cooney	Labor
1985	6	Jim Short	Liberal
1985	7	John Siddons	Democrats
1982
1982	1	John Button	Labor
1982	2	Margaret Guilfoyle	Liberal
1982	3	Gareth Evans	Labor
1982	4	Austin Lewis	Liberal
1982	5	Don Chipp	Democrats

1984 Australian federal election: Senate, Victoria
Party	Candidate	Votes	%	±%
Quota		298,787		
Labor	1. Olive Zakharov (elected 1); 2. Robert Ray (elected 3); 3. Barney Cooney (elected 5); 4. Carole Marple	1,053,488	44.0	−2.4
Liberal	1. Alan Missen (elected 2); 2. David Hamer (elected 4); 3. Jim Short (elected 6); 4. Richard Alston; 5. Zirka Yaskewych	816,362	34.2	+34.2
Nuclear Disarmament	1. Jean Melzer; 2. Venturino Venturini	174,389	7.3	+7.3
Democrats	1. John Siddons (elected 7); 2. Janet Powell; 3. Ian Price; 4. Sid Spindler; 5. Kenneth Peak	165,624	6.9	−5.1
National	1. Shirley McKerrow; 2. John Cromarty; 3. Louise Jenkins; 4. John Keating; 5. Murray Buzza	95,954	4.0	+4.0
Democratic Labour	1. Brian Handley; 2. Maria Handley; 3. William Mahony; 4. Lois Mahony	32,472	1.3	−0.9
Call to Australia	1. Barry Tattersall; 2. Valerie Renkema; 3. Edna Hall; 4. John Easton	30,797	1.3	+1.3
Pensioner	1. Neil McKay; 2. Margaret Carter	19,922	0.8	+0.8
Independent	Maurice Smith	615	0.0	0.0
Independent	Tiger Casley	249	0.0	0.0
Independent	Bill Kapphan	168	0.0	0.0
Independent	Michael Krape	155	0.0	0.0
Independent	Augustus Titter	93	0.0	0.0
Total formal votes		2,390,288	95.8	+6.5
Informal votes		104,906	4.2	−6.5
Turnout		2,495,194	95.4	−0.5

- The Liberals and Nationals contested the previous election as a Coalition in the previous election, and did not do so in this election. The Coalition vote of 1983 of 38.2% was unchanged from the combined Liberal and National vote of this election.

== Queensland ==
Elected	#	Senator	Party
1985
1985	1	Margaret Reynolds	Labor
1985	2	Ron Boswell	National
1985	3	David MacGibbon	Liberal
1985	4	Gerry Jones	Labor
1985	5	Glen Sheil	National
1985	6	John Black	Labor
1985	7	Michael Macklin	Democrats
1982
1982	1	George Georges	Labor
1982	2	Flo Bjelke-Petersen	National
1982	3	Warwick Parer	Liberal
1982	4	Mal Colston	Labor
1982	5	Stan Collard	National

1984 Australian federal election: Senate, Queensland
Party	Candidate	Votes	%	±%
Quota		176,095		
Labor	1. Margaret Reynolds (elected 1); 2. Gerry Jones (elected 4); 3. John Black (elected 6); 4. Bryant Burns	558,623	39.7	+0.1
National	1. Ron Boswell (elected 2); 2. Glen Sheil (elected 5); 3. Patrick Behan; 4. Alan Metcalfe	406,829	28.9	−0.2
Liberal	1. David MacGibbon (elected 3); 2. William Everingham; 3. Olive-Orme Scott-Young; 4. Christopher Gilbert; 5. Maurice Thomson	244,753	17.4	+2.5
Democrats	1. Michael Macklin (elected 7); 2. Ray Hollis; 3. John Elfick; 4. Cheryl Kernot	129,636	9.2	+1.3
Nuclear Disarmament	1. Patsy Goodwin; 2. Bernard Hockings	62,102	4.4	+4.4
Conservative	1. Fast Bucks; 2. Peter Livesey	4,731	0.3	+0.3
Group B	1. Hugh Bruce; 2. Michael Carr	1,317	0.1	+0.1
Independent	Frank Bologna	335	0.0	0.0
Independent	Raymond Medwin	207	0.0	0.0
Independent	Norman Eather	94	0.0	0.0
Independent	Cyril McKenzie	86	0.0	0.0
Independent	Dietar Soegemeier	39	0.0	0.0
Total formal votes		1,408,752	97.0	+5.6
Informal votes		43,919	3.0	−5.6
Turnout		1,452,671	93.4	+0.8

== Western Australia ==
Elected	#	Senator	Party
1985
1985	1	Patricia Giles	Labor
1985	2	Noel Crichton-Browne	Liberal
1985	3	Peter Cook	Labor
1985	4	Reg Withers	Liberal
1985	5	Jim McKiernan	Labor
1985	6	Sue Knowles	Liberal
1985	7	Jo Vallentine	NDP
1982
1982	1	Peter Walsh	Labor
1982	2	Fred Chaney	Liberal
1982	3	Ruth Coleman	Labor
1982	4	Peter Durack	Liberal
1982	5	Gordon McIntosh	Labor

1984 Australian federal election: Senate, Western Australia
Party	Candidate	Votes	%	±%
Quota		96,467		
Labor	1. Patricia Giles (elected 1); 2. Peter Cook (elected 3); 3. Jim McKiernan (elected 5); 4. John Crouch	334,371	43.3	−6.0
Liberal	1. Noel Crichton-Browne (elected 2); 2. Reg Withers (elected 4); 3. Sue Knowles (elected 6); 4. Murray Nixon	313,738	40.7	−0.3
Nuclear Disarmament	1. Jo Vallentine (elected 7); 2. Lindsay Matthews	52,365	6.8	+6.8
Democrats	1. Jack Evans; 2. Richard Jeffreys; 3. Jean Jenkins	37,369	4.8	−2.0
Family Movement	1. Brian Peachey; 2. Beryl Van Lyn; 3. Nellie Clark; 4. John Gilmour; 5. Kenneth Wright; 6. Roland Bott	18,041	2.3	+2.3
National	1. Bruce Currie; 2. Eric Blight; 3. Mort Schell; 4. Graham Barrett-Lennard	13,739	1.7	+0.6
Group E	1. Frank Nesci; 2. Nellie Stuart	1,033	0.1	+0.1
Independent	Peter van Tongeren	861	0.1	+0.1
Independent	Frank Ash	154	0.0	0.0
Independent	Martin Suter	62	0.0	0.0
Total formal votes		771,733	95.3	+3.1
Informal votes		37,739	4.7	−3.1
Turnout		809,472	94.2	+1.2

== South Australia ==
Elected	#	Senator	Party
1985
1985	1	Nick Bolkus	Labor
1985	2	Baden Teague	Liberal
1985	3	Graham Maguire	Labor
1985	4	Don Jessop	Liberal
1985	5	Rosemary Crowley	Labor
1985	6	Amanda Vanstone	Liberal
1985	7	David Vigor	Democrats
1982
1982	1	Ron Elstob	Labor
1982	2	Tony Messner	Liberal
1982	3	Janine Haines	Democrats
1982	4	Dominic Foreman	Labor
1982	5	Robert Hill	Liberal

1984 Australian federal election: Senate, South Australia
Party	Candidate	Votes	%	±%
Quota		101,997		
Labor	1. Nick Bolkus (elected 1); 2. Graham Maguire (elected 3); 3. Rosemary Crowley (elected 5); 4. Vic Heron	340,115	41.7	−2.9
Liberal	1. Baden Teague (elected 2); 2. Don Jessop (elected 4); 3. Amanda Vanstone (elected 6); 4. Robert Giles	306,027	37.5	−2.9
Democrats	1. David Vigor (elected 7); 2. John Coulter; 3. Mike Elliott; 4. Sandra Kanck	91,329	11.2	−0.9
Nuclear Disarmament	1. Frances Mowling; 2. Ian Modistach; 3. Douglas Peers	37,834	4.6	+4.6
Call to Australia	1. Bob Brown; 2. Dean Davis; 3. William Pomery	22,429	2.7	+2.7
National	1. John Bannon; 2. Judith Jackson; 3. Ray Rothe; 4. Helen Scott; 5. Audrey Pobke	10,756	1.3	−0.4
Pensioner	1. Wilfred Scott; 2. Kenneth Perry	4,052	0.5	+0.5
Group F	1. Judy Gillett; 2. Brian Sones; 3. Eugene Sibelle	1,328	0.2	+0.2
Group D	1. Joe Rossi; 2. Warwick Stallard; 3. Giovanni Melino; 4. Gizella Farkas	840	0.1	+0.1
Family Movement	1. Bob Boyd; 2. Fred Tanner	800	0.1	+0.1
Independent	Herman Bersee	199	0.0	0.0
Independent	Peter Gagliardi	169	0.0	0.0
Independent	Edward Dyer	92	0.0	0.0
Total formal votes		815,970	94.6	+3.4
Informal votes		46,399	5.4	−3.4
Turnout		862,369	95.2	+0.2

== Tasmania ==
Elected	#	Senator	Party
1985
1985	1	Terry Aulich	Labor
1985	2	Brian Archer	Liberal
1985	3	Ray Devlin	Labor
1985	4	John Watson	Liberal
1985	5	John Coates	Labor
1985	6	Michael Townley	Liberal
1985	7	Norm Sanders	Democrats
1982
1982	1	Peter Rae	Liberal
1982	2	Don Grimes	Labor
1982	3	Brian Harradine	Independent
1982	4	Shirley Walters	Liberal
1982	5	Michael Tate	Labor

1984 Australian federal election: Senate, Tasmania
Party	Candidate	Votes	%	±%
Quota		32,724		
Labor	1. Terry Aulich (elected 1); 2. Ray Devlin (elected 3); 3. John Coates (elected 5); 4. John White	108,900	41.6	+8.8
Liberal	1. Brian Archer (elected 2); 2. John Watson (elected 4); 3. Michael Townley (elected 6); 4. Eric Abetz; 5. Des Cooper; 6. Michael Chabrel	106,427	40.6	−2.0
Group C (Harradine Group)	1. Kath Venn; 2. Colin Sacco	22,992	8.8	−9.0
Democrats	1. Norm Sanders (elected 7}; 2. Lyn Hewitt	15,897	6.1	−0.7
Nuclear Disarmament	1. Ian Paulin; 2. Anne Parker	7,574	2.9	+2.9
Total formal votes		261,790	94.2	+1.6
Informal votes		16,155	5.8	−1.6
Turnout		277,945	95.8	−0.2

== Australian Capital Territory ==
Elected	#	Senator	Party
1984
1984	1	Susan Ryan	Labor
1984	2	Margaret Reid	Liberal

1984 Australian federal election: Senate, Australian Capital Territory
Party	Candidate	Votes	%	±%
Quota		45,608		
Labor	1. Susan Ryan (elected 1); 2. Hugh Saddler	60,763	44.4	−10.9
Liberal	1. Margaret Reid (elected 2); 2. David Walters	43,699	31.9	+0.2
Nuclear Disarmament	1. John Conway; 2. Jan Barratt	14,025	10.3	+10.3
Democrats	1. John Hatton; 2. Julia Knyvett	12,571	9.2	−2.7
Referendum First	1. Allan Nelson; 2. Tony Spagnolo	5,808	4.2	+4.2
Total formal votes		136,866	96.6	−0.1
Informal votes		4,813	3.4	+0.1
Turnout		141,679	94.2	−1.8

== Northern Territory ==
Elected	#	Senator	Party
1984
1984	1	Bernie Kilgariff	CLP
1984	2	Ted Robertson	Labor

1984 Australian federal election: Senate, Northern Territory
Party	Candidate	Votes	%	±%
Quota		19,004		
Country Liberal	1. Bernie Kilgariff (elected 1); 2. Patricia Davies	27,972	48.9	+0.8
Labor	1. Ted Robertson (elected 2); 2. Warren Snowdon	26,040	45.4	−0.6
Democrats	1. Betty Pearce; 2. Fay Lawrence	2,449	4.2	−1.1
Independent	Vincent Forrester	548	0.9	+0.9
Total formal votes		57,009	96.8	+1.5
Informal votes		1,862	3.2	−1.5
Turnout		58,871	85.5	+4.1

== See also ==
- 1984 Australian federal election
- Candidates of the Australian federal election, 1984
- Members of the Australian Senate, 1985–1987
