= David MacGibbon =

David MacGibbon may refer to:

- David MacGibbon (architect) (1831–1902), Scottish architect.
- David MacGibbon (politician) (born 1934), retired Australian senator.
