= John Stone (Australian politician) =

Australian politician (1929–2025)

John Stone AO

Leader of the National Party in the Senate
- In office 21 August 1987 – 1 March 1990
- Leader: Ian Sinclair; Charles Blunt
- Preceded by: Stan Collard
- Succeeded by: Ron Boswell

Senator for Queensland
- In office 11 July 1987 – 1 March 1990
- Succeeded by: Bill O'Chee

Secretary of the Department of the Treasury
- In office 8 January 1979 – 14 September 1984
- Preceded by: Frederick Wheeler
- Succeeded by: Bernie Fraser

Personal details
- Born: 31 January 1929 Perth, Western Australia, Australia
- Died: 17 July 2025 (aged 96) Sydney, Australia
- Party: National Party of Australia
- Spouse: Nancy Hardwick (m. 1954)
- Children: 5
- Education: University of Western Australia; New College, Oxford
- Occupation: Public servant and politician

John Owen Stone AO (31 January 1929 – 17 July 2025) was an Australian public servant and politician. He was Secretary to the Treasury between 1979 and 1984, and a senator for Queensland, representing the National Party, from 1987 to 1990.

== Early life ==
Stone was born in Perth on 31 January 1929. He was the first of two sons born to Eva Sydney Myee (née Hunt) and Horace Joseph Stone; his father was a wheat farmer and his mother was a primary school teacher.

Stone spent most of his early childhood on his father's farming property at Korbel in the Western Australian wheatbelt. He briefly lived in Perth and attended a state school in Victoria Park, then received the rest of his primary schooling in Korbel. His parents divorced when he was 12 years old and he and his younger brother moved to Perth to live with their mother. He completed his secondary schooling at Perth Modern School on a scholarship.

Stone graduated Bachelor of Science from the University of Western Australia in 1950, with first-class honours in mathematical physics. He was president of the University of Western Australia Student Guild in 1951, defeating future prime minister Bob Hawke for the position, and also played field hockey at state level for Western Australia. Stone was named Western Australia's Rhodes Scholar for 1951. Initially continuing his studies in physics, he switched to economics after a semester and graduated Bachelor of Arts in philosophy, politics and economics.

== Public service career ==
After completing his degree at the University of Oxford, in 1954 Stone returned to Australia and joined the Treasury. He rose within the Treasury department to become Secretary during the period of the Fraser government. His signature was familiar to many older Australians for, as Secretary to the Treasury from 1979 to 1984, it appeared on the obverse side of all Australian banknotes printed during that period.

He penned a severe critique of Fraser's economic policies, which was used against the Liberal Party once the Australian Labor Party won the 1983 federal election. He supported some of the Hawke-Keating government's economic reforms, although he had little time for Bob Hawke or Paul Keating personally. While his resignation from the Treasury did not become effective until 14 September 1984, he announced his imminent departure on 15 August 1984, just six days before the 1984–85 Budget was handed down. That was seen by commentators at the time as a strongly adverse comment on the government's direction.

Despite holding what were seen by some to be neoliberal economic views, Stone initially opposed the decision in December 1983 to float the Australian dollar, and consistently deplored a consumption tax. In fact, after it was introduced, he repeatedly denounced the GST, and then-Treasurer Peter Costello.

== Politics ==
An informal advisor to Queensland's longest-serving premier, Sir Joh Bjelke-Petersen, Stone was elected to the Australian Senate at the 1987 election representing Queensland, as a member of the pro-Bjelke-Petersen National Party. John Howard, Liberal Party leader at the time, appointed Stone as the Opposition finance spokesman.

Following the release of the Coalition's One Australia immigration policy in 1988, Stone said: "Asian immigration has to be slowed. It's no use dancing around the bushes." Following pressure from Howard, National leader Ian Sinclair sacked Stone from the shadow ministry for making those comments, "with regret". This was seen by many in his party as a capitulation to the Liberals.

In 1990, Stone left the Senate and contested the House of Representatives seat of Fairfax, his Senate place being taken by Bill O'Chee. Unsuccessful in his attempt to win Fairfax, he abandoned parliamentary life but remained very much in the public eye.

== Later activities ==
After 1990, Stone was an outspoken critic of multiculturalism and a supporter of the Samuel Griffith Society, which he helped found. He had a column on economics and politics in The Australian Financial Review. Other Australian publications for which he wrote include The Sydney Morning Herald, the quarterly National Observer, and Quadrant. Stone was critical of the Howard government for eroding the power of the states within the Australian federal system, regarding that as a departure from the long-standing Liberal/National coalition support for "states' rights". However, in an article published in the March 2008 issue of Quadrant, Stone argued that Howard had been Australia's greatest Prime Minister.

In June 2022, Stone was appointed Officer of the Order of Australia in the 2022 Queen's Birthday Honours for "distinguished service to the people and Parliament of Australia, and to public administration".

== Personal life and death ==
In 1954, Stone married Nancy Hardwick, with whom he had five children. He died on 17 July 2025, at the age of 96.

== Notes ==
Government offices
| Preceded by Frederick Wheeler | Secretary of the Department of the Treasury; 1979–1984 | Succeeded by Bernie Fraser |
