= Chris Ketter =

Australian politician

Consul-General of Australia in San Francisco
- Incumbent
- Assumed office 1 December 2023
- Preceded by: Nick Nichles

Senator for Queensland
- In office 1 July 2014 – 30 June 2019
- Preceded by: John Hogg
- Succeeded by: Gerard Rennick

Personal details
- Born: 12 February 1961 (age 65) Brisbane, Queensland, Australia
- Party: Australian Labor Party
- Spouse: Ellie Ketter
- Education: University of Queensland
- Occupation: Trade unionist

Christopher Ronald Ketter (born 12 February 1961) is an Australian diplomat and former politician who represented Queensland for the Australian Labor Party in the Australian Senate from 1 July 2014, elected at the 2013 election, until 30 June 2019. He currently serves as Australia's consul-general and senior trade and investment commissioner in San Francisco.

== Early life ==
Ketter was born in Brisbane and grew up in the suburb of Holland Park. He holds the degrees of Bachelor of Commerce and Bachelor of Arts (Economics) from University of Queensland.

Ketter worked for the Shop, Distributive and Allied Employees Association (SDA) from 1982 until his election to the Senate in 2014, initially as a research officer and ultimately as Queensland Branch secretary from 1996.

== Political career ==
In addition to serving as the deputy opposition whip in the Senate, Ketter was the chair of the Senate Economics References Committee from October 2015.

In this capacity, Ketter led Senate Inquiries into high-profile issues such as corporate tax avoidance, the cooperatives and mutuals sector, the dairy industry, and non-conforming building products, including asbestos and flammable cladding.

In 2016, Ketter sought to amplify regional voices within the Queensland Branch of the Labor Party by co-founding Labor for the Regions, now Regional Labor. In 2018, he chaired an inquiry into the indicators of, and impact of, regional inequality in Australia.

Ketter was active on many Senate committees, including:

- Joint Standing Committee on Electoral Matters
- Joint Statutory Committee on Public Accounts and Audit
- Joint Statutory Committee on Corporations and Financial Services

Ketter was known for his social conservatism, including opposition to euthanasia. Ketter was one of only two Labor senators (along with Helen Polley) to vote against the Marriage Amendment (Definition and Religious Freedoms) Act 2017, which legalised same-sex marriage in Australia.

== Post-politics ==
In July 2023, the minister for trade announced Ketter's appointment as consul-general and senior trade and investment commissioner in San Francisco.
