= Ron Boswell =

Australian politician (1940–2026)

The Honourable Ron Boswell AO
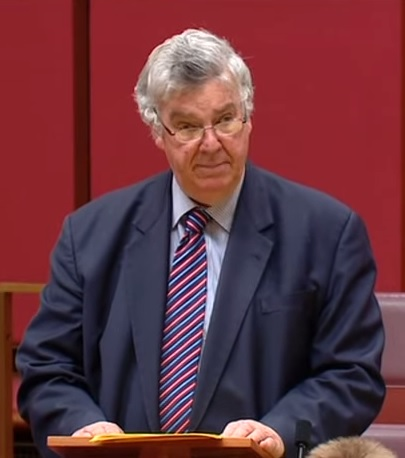

Leader of the National Party in the Senate
- In office 10 April 1990 – 3 December 2007
- Leader: Tim Fischer; Mark Vaile
- Preceded by: John Stone
- Succeeded by: Nigel Scullion

Senator for Queensland
- In office 5 March 1983 – 30 June 2014

Personal details
- Born: 9 December 1940 Perth, Western Australia, Australia
- Died: 6 January 2026 (aged 85)
- Party: National Party
- Spouse: Leita Beattie (m. 1966; died 2021)
- Education: St Joseph's College, Gregory Terrace
- Occupation: Politician; salesman

Ronald Leslie Doyle Boswell (9 December 1940 – 6 January 2026) was an Australian politician. He was a Senator for Queensland from 1983 to 2014, representing the National Party. He was the party's Senate leader from 1990 to 2007, a record term. He was also a parliamentary secretary in the Howard government from 1999 to 2003. He was Father of the Senate from 2008 until his retirement in 2014.

== Early life ==
Boswell was born in Perth, Western Australia, on 9 December 1940. In his memoirs he recalled a tumultuous childhood including "two parental separations, frequent changes of school, and an abduction (by his mother, accompanied by her lover) to Melbourne".

Boswell spent his early years in Perth, attending five schools in six years. He moved to Brisbane after his father was transferred for work reasons, where he attended St Joseph's College, Gregory Terrace.

Boswell left school at the age of 14 and began working as an office boy at an insurance firm. He later worked as an insurance agent and travelling salesman, including selling paintbrushes. He first came into contact with Queensland premier Joh Bjelke-Petersen in his role as a manufacturers' agent, lobbying against the deregulation of weekend trading hours.

== Politics ==
=== Early involvement ===
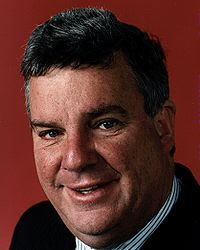
Boswell in the 1990s during the Howard government

Boswell was convinced to join the National Party by his wife, a long-time member. He was elected chairman of the party's Wynnum branch in 1974 and to the party's central council in 1976, serving on its management committee and as a metropolitan vice-president. He was also chairman of the party's fishing industry committee.

=== Opposition (1983–1996) ===
In 1982, Boswell won preselection for the third position on the National Party's Senate ticket in Queensland, behind incumbent senators Florence Bjelke-Petersen and Stan Collard. He was elected to a three-year Senate term at the 1983 federal election, which followed a double dissolution. In the lead-up to the election he hired a publicity officer "to get his name known in provincial Queensland". He would be re-elected to the Senate on a further six occasions, in 1984, 1987, 1990, 1996, 2001 and 2007.

Prior to the 1984 election, Boswell controversially announced that he would deny supply to the Hawke government if it were re-elected, leading to a public rebuke from National Party leader Ian Sinclair.

In 1988, Boswell was added to John Howard's shadow ministry, holding the regional development and external territories portfolio under Howard and his successor, Andrew Peacock, until 1990. He returned to the shadow cabinet in 1993 under John Hewson, holding the portfolios of Northern Australia and external territories. He was moved to the consumer affairs portfolio in May 1994 after Alexander Downer became opposition leader. In December 1994 he and five other conservative senators crossed the floor to vote against the Human Rights (Sexual Conduct) Act 1994, which guaranteed sexual privacy. Downer supported the legislation and Boswell consequently resigned from the shadow cabinet.

Following a National Party leadership spill after the 1990 election, Boswell was elected as the party's Senate leader, defeating David Brownhill. He would retain the position for a record 17 years, until stepping down after the 2007 election.

=== Howard government (1996–2007) ===
Boswell was appointed parliamentary secretary to the Minister for Transport and Regional Services in July 1999 but left the position in October 2003. After he was succeeded as leader of the Nationals in the Senate by Nigel Scullion following the 2007 election, Boswell became Scullion's deputy. He was succeeded in that position by Fiona Nash in 2008.

Boswell's bid for re-election at the 2001 election was framed as a head-to-head contest between him and One Nation leader Pauline Hanson for Queensland's sixth Senate seat. In his valedictory speech to the Senate in 2014, he stated that he "risked everything to stand up against her aggressive, narrow view of Australia ... defeating Pauline Hanson and One Nation in 2001 has been my greatest political achievement". He was an outspoken opponent of other far-right groups such as the League of Rights and the Citizens Electoral Council, in 1988 denouncing the League of Rights as "racist, anti-semitic and neo-Nazi".

=== Final years (2007–2014) ===
Boswell reluctantly announced his support for the merger of the Nationals and Liberals in 2008, seeing the creation of the Liberal National Party of Queensland as "the lesser of two evils" following suggestions that a new standalone conservative party should be created.

In 2011, Boswell was a critic of the then Australian government's carbon emissions trading scheme. He called for the scheme to be abandoned. On 17 September 2012, during a Senate debate on a proposed marriage inequality bill, Boswell spoke out against same-sex marriage in Australia stating: "Two mothers or two fathers can't raise a child properly. Who takes the boy to football? Who tells him what's right from wrong? What does he do? Go along with mum, or two mums? How does he go camping or fishing? It won't work, it's defying nature!"

Boswell announced on 21 September 2012 that he did not intend to seek re-election in 2013 and would retire when his Senate term expired in 2014.

== Personal life and death ==
In 1966, Boswell married Leita Beattie, an educator who worked as a schoolteacher at Moreton Bay College for over 40 years. He was widowed in 2021.

Boswell published his memoirs, Ron Boswell: Not Pretty, But Pretty Effective, in December 2023.

Boswell developed acute respiratory distress syndrome after knee surgery in 2019 and was hospitalised for four months with pneumonia, kidney failure and lung failure. He died on 6 January 2026 at the age of 85.

Parliament of Australia
| Preceded by John Watson | Father of the Australian Senate; 2008–2014 | Succeeded by John Faulkner |
Party political offices
| Preceded by John Stone | Leader of the Nationals in the Senate; 1990–2007 | Succeeded by Nigel Scullion |
| Preceded by Nigel Scullion | Deputy Leader of the National Party of Australia in the Senate; 2007–2008 | Succeeded by Fiona Nash |
