= Referendum First Group =

Former Australian political party

The Referendum First Group was a minor Australian political party that operated in the Australian Capital Territory in 1984. It was a single-issue party, demanding a referendum before granting the ACT self-government. After contesting the 1984 federal election the party faded out of existence.
