= Paul Stevenson (psychologist) =

Australian psychologist

Paul Joseph Stevenson OAM (born 12 September 1955) is an Australian psychologist. He has worked on-site at numerous international disasters as a trauma psychologist.

== Career ==
Stevenson is an international trauma psychologist, with experience in general and trauma counselling. His experience includes on-site involvement with the Moura Mine Disaster in 1994, the Port Arthur Massacre (Australia) in 1996, the Thredbo landslide in 1997, the Bali bombings in 2002 and 2005, the Marriott bombing (Jakarta) in 2003, the 2004 Australian Embassy bombing in Jakarta, the Indian Ocean tsunami recovery in 2004–05, the Victorian Bushfires in 2009, He received the Medal of the Order of Australia for his work following the 2002 Bali Bombings. the 2010–2011 Queensland floods, Cyclone Oswald, and support for the families of those lost in Malaysia Airlines Flight 370.

Stevenson has worked as a psychologist at the Manus Regional Processing Centre and the Nauru Detention Centre, providing support to both staff and detainees. He maintains that the levels of psychological trauma at these Centres are the worst he has ever seen, and that Australia has an ethical responsibility to ensure these Centres are closed down. As a result of speaking out, Stevenson had his contract to work on Nauru summarily terminated by PsyCare.

Stevenson suggests that the traditional method of Critical Incident Stress Debriefing needs to be used with caution, and suggests that an eclectic and humanitarian approach is necessary for stress and trauma response. Stevenson believes that to some extent psychological trauma may be a natural reaction to extreme circumstances. Stevenson supports de-stigmatization of psychological trauma and mental illness.

Stevenson was an Independent Candidate for the Senate (Queensland) in the 2016 Australian federal election.

== Accolades ==
- Medal of the Order of Australia OAM
- United Nations Queensland Award
- Current National President of the Australian Association of Psychologists
- Accredited Compassion Fatigue Educator, Green Cross International Academy of Traumatology

== Publications ==
- Stevenson, Paul. 2008. Best Practice for Human Services. Southport: Access Psychology.
- Stevenson, Paul. 2006. Are We There Yet? A Brief Strategy for Planning and Evaluation for the Human Services. Southport: Access Psychology.
- Stevenson, Paul. 2006. Postcards from Ground Zero. Burleigh: Zeus Publications.
