= Bill O'Chee =

Australian politician

Senator for Queensland
- In office 8 May 1990 – 30 June 1999
- Preceded by: John Stone

Personal details
- Born: 19 June 1965 (age 61) Brisbane, Queensland, Australia
- Party: National Party of Australia
- Education: Brasenose College, Oxford
- Occupation: Investment banker

William George "Bill" O'Chee (born 19 June 1965) is an Australian politician. He was a National Party member of the Australian Senate from 1990 to 1999, representing the state of Queensland.

== Biography ==
O'Chee was born to a Chinese father and an Irish-Australian mother. He attended school at Belmont State School, The Southport School and Brisbane State High School in Australia, as well as Oakham School in England. He later studied jurisprudence at Brasenose College at the University of Oxford, where he was a contemporary of Amanda Pullinger, Guy Spier and David Cameron. Prior to his election he was an investment banker specialising in Latin American debt.

== Parliamentary career ==
Bill O'Chee was appointed to the Senate in 1990 to a casual vacancy caused by the resignation of John Stone. He was one of the first ethnic-Chinese Australians to become a member of the Parliament of Australia. At age 24, he was also the youngest person to have become a senator, until the appointment of Jordon Steele-John (aged 23) in 2017.

He was elected in his own right at the 1993 election, but lost his seat at the 1998 election, his term ending on 30 June 1999.

During his time in the Senate, he served on the Senate Standing Committee on Legal and Constitutional Affairs, the Joint Parliamentary Committee on Treaties, the Senate Standing Committee on Environment, Recreation, Communications and the Arts, the Senate Select Committee on A New Tax System, and the Senate Standing Committee on Regulations and Ordinances (of which he was chairman from 1996 to 1999).

He was also National Party whip in the Senate from 1993 to 1999, and chairman of the Immigration and Multicultural Affairs Policy Committee.

As a coalition government senator, he clashed with his prime minister John Howard over reforms to the Native Title Act. O'Chee believed that native title over pastoral and mining leases should have been extinguished in their entirety but wished, in return, to grant freehold title to aboriginal claimants who succeeded in proving their claim over vacant crown land. His proposals were not accepted by Howard, although he did win significant concessions for pastoral landholders.

He also won a landmark case over parliamentary privilege. He had been sued by a plaintiff wishing to gain discovery of his constituency files. O'Chee refused to hand over the files, on the basis that they contained confidential information given to him by persons who wished to remain anonymous. He was ordered to produce the files, but appealed to the Court of Appeal of Queensland, which held that communications between a parliamentarian and constituents were covered under parliamentary privilege and, as such, were entitled to confidentiality. The case thus set an important precedent, expanding the scope of parliamentary privilege.

In 2001 he defected to the Liberal Party and subsequently became a member of the Liberal National Party when the two parties merged in Queensland.

In November 2011, O'Chee alleged that in 1998, News Limited had attempted to bribe him to cross the floor and vote in their financial interests.

== Sporting career ==
During his time at Oxford University, he coxed the Brasenose College Boat Club First VIII. He also coxed the Oxford University lightweight rowing crew in 1987. He later coached schoolgirls rowing in Canberra during the 1990s.

Later, O'Chee represented Australia in the sport of skeleton from 1989 to 2002 at World Cup and World Championship races. He was the first Australian to achieve a "top half" finish in a world championship in bobsleigh, skeleton or luge. His highest world cup placing was 17th in Cervinia in 1990. He also achieved a number of top 20 finishes in World Cup races. His highest FIBT World Championships placing was 21st in St Moritz in 1998.

== Community roles ==
He is a National Councillor of Australians for Constitutional Monarchy, and a former National Councillor of Scouts Australia. He has been a Patron of the Australian Chinese Ex-Services National Reunion. O'Chee was also named as a Global Leader for Tomorrow by the World Economic Forum in 1994.
