= Margaret Reynolds =

Australian politician

The Honourable Margaret Reynolds AC
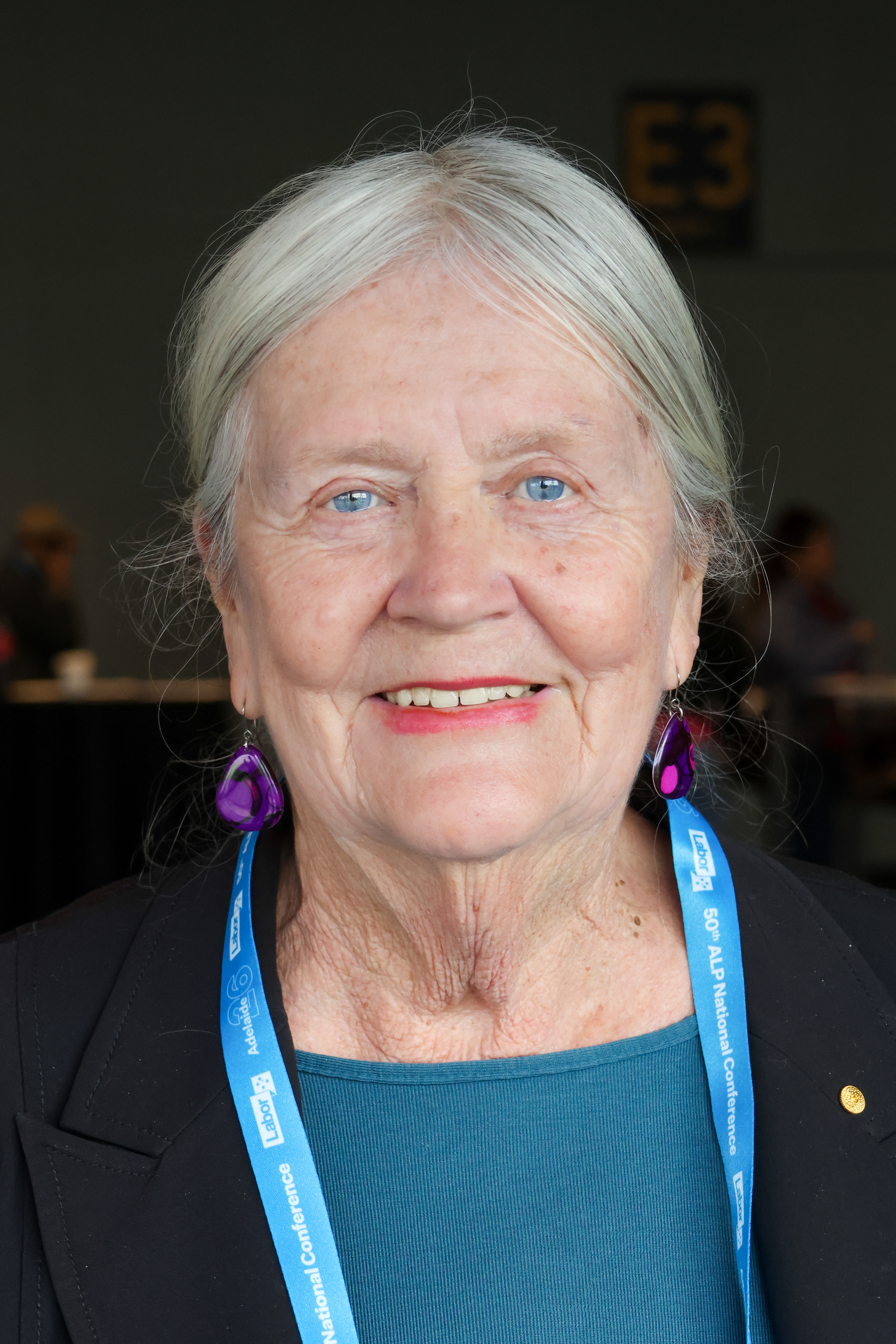
- Reynolds in 2026

Minister Assisting the Prime Minister for the Status of Women
- In office 19 January 1988 – 4 April 1990
- Prime Minister: Bob Hawke
- Preceded by: Susan Ryan
- Succeeded by: Wendy Fatin

Minister for Local Government
- In office 18 September 1987 – 4 April 1990
- Prime Minister: Bob Hawke
- Preceded by: New title
- Succeeded by: Wendy Fatin

Senator for Queensland
- In office 5 March 1983 – 30 June 1999

Personal details
- Born: Margaret Lyne; 19 July 1941 (age 85) Hobart, Tasmania, Australia
- Party: Labor
- Spouse: Henry Reynolds (m. 1963)
- Children: 3, incl. Anna
- Education: University of Queensland
- Profession: Schoolteacher

Margaret Reynolds AC (née Lyne; born 19 July 1941) is a former Australian politician. She was a Senator for Queensland from 1983 to 1999, representing the Australian Labor Party (ALP). She held ministerial office in the Hawke government as Minister for Local Government (1987–1990) and Minister Assisting the Prime Minister for the Status of Women (1988–1990).

== Early life and teaching career ==
Reynolds was born on 19 July 1941 in Hobart, Tasmania. She was the only child of Jess (née Montgomery) and Walter Rodis "Rod" Lyne. Her father was a farm labourer and soldier who served in New Guinea during World War II. He died in 1947, after which she and her mother relocated to Launceston to be closer to her maternal grandparents. Both her mother and maternal grandmother were schoolteachers.

Reynolds attended Trevallyn Primary School and Launceston State High School, matriculating in 1957. She subsequently studied teaching for two years at the University of Tasmania. Her first teaching post was at the small rural locality of Natone in the state's north-west. She subsequently undertook further training in special education and taught at schools in Launceston, Devonport, and the Derwent Valley. Reynolds and her husband moved to England in 1964 and spent a year teaching at schools in London's East End. They returned to Australia in mid-1965 and settled in Townsville, Queensland, where her husband became a lecturer at Townsville University College.

In Townsville, Reynolds taught for periods at Cootharinga, a special education school, and at Aitkenvale State School. Reynolds, along with her husband, were vocal supporters of the Black Community School established in Townsville by Eddie Koiki Mabo in 1973, which aimed to provide a program better suited to black children's needs. Reynolds also lent her educational experience to helping the school in its early stages, and wrote articles about it in journals.

She completed a diploma in education at James Cook University in 1977 and was appointed as a tutor in language and literature at the local College of Advanced Education. She subsequently completed the degree of Bachelor of Arts at the University of Queensland in 1982.

== Early political involvement ==
In 1966, Reynolds joined the One People of Australia League (OPAL), becoming secretary of the Townsville branch. She helped establish an OPAL kindergarten for Aboriginal and Torres Strait Islander children, working with Indigenous activists Bobbi Sykes and Eddie Mabo. She and Sykes were expelled from OPAL in 1967 for their perceived radicalism. During the Australia's involvement in the Vietnam War, Reynolds helped establish a branch of the anti-conscription organisation Save Our Sons and was active in the Townsville Peace Committee. She was also a founding member of the Townsville branch of the Women's Electoral Lobby and served as its publicity officer.

Reynolds joined the ALP in 1971 and unsuccessfully sought preselection for a state parliament seat in 1976. She was elected to the Townsville City Council in 1979 and served for four years until her election to the Senate. She also served on the ALP state council from 1981 to 1983 and was a campaign director for federal elections. In 1982 she became a full-time organiser for the party in North Queensland.

== Parliament ==
Reynolds was elected to the Senate at the 1983 federal election, winning a "short" term expiring on 30 June 1985 under the provisions for double dissolution elections. She was the ALP's first female senator in Queensland. Prior to the 1984 election she narrowly avoided being allocated to an "unwinnable" position on the ALP ticket, as the right faction sought to install its preferred candidate John Black. However, the National Executive intervened in her favour and was given first place on the ticket.

=== Government minister ===
Reynolds was re-elected to another six-year term at the 1987 election, which followed another double dissolution. After the election she "publicly urged each faction to include a woman among their ministerial nominees, risking charges of self-interest and the antagonism of many of her colleagues". Reynolds was appointed as a parliamentary secretary in the third Hawke ministry on 24 July 1987, with responsibility for local government. She was elevated to Minister for Local Government on 18 September 1987. She was a leader of the government's campaign for the "Yes" vote in the 1988 referendum on local government, which sought to enshrine local government in the constitution but was heavily defeated, along with the other referendum proposals put forward at the same time.

On 19 January 1988, Reynolds was also appointed Minister Assisting the Prime Minister on the Status of Women. She secured cabinet approval to implement the policies outlined in the Hawke government's National Agenda for Women, despite "resistance to the agenda from some Labor ministers who dismissed it as indulgent middle class feminism".

=== Final years in the Senate ===
Reynolds opted not to seek re-election to the ministry after the 1990 election, citing health reasons, and was replaced in both her portfolios by her left-faction colleague Wendy Fatin. Her ministerial appointments ended on 4 April 1990.

Reynolds was re-elected to a final six-year term at the 1993 election and retired when her term expired on 30 June 1999. She was an assertive backbencher, joining Bruce Childs and John Coates in abstaining in the vote on Australian participation in the Gulf War in 1991. They were subsequently reprimanded by the ALP National Executive. In the Senate she spoke frequently on Indigenous affairs and served as the ALP government's representative on the Council for Aboriginal Reconciliation from 1991 to 1996.

== Later life ==
After leaving parliament Reynolds served as chair of the Commonwealth Human Rights International Advisory Commission from 1999 to 2005 and as president of the United Nations Association of Australia from 2000 to 2005. She also served as an adjunct professor at the University of Queensland and University of Tasmania. She later worked as state manager of a Tasmanian disability services provider from 2004 to 2012.

As of 2023 Reynolds was president of the Australian branch of the Women's International League for Peace and Freedom.

In 1995, Reynolds published a book titled The Last Bastion: Labor women working towards equality in the parliaments of Australia, which is a compilation of biographical details about ALP women from the Party's inception till the year it was published. A further book, Living Politics, was published by University of Queensland Press in 2007.

== Personal life ==
Reynolds had three children with her husband Henry Reynolds, whom she married in 1963. Their daughter Anna was elected Lord Mayor of Hobart in 2018.

In December 2016, Margaret Reynolds became the founding President of ABC Friends National Inc., the co-ordinating body of the various state/territory Friends groups around Australia.

== Honours and recognition ==
Reynolds was appointed a Companion of the Order of Australia (AC) in the 2023 Australia Day Honours for "eminent service to the people and Parliament of Australia, to social justice, gender equality and Indigenous rights, to local government, and to the community".

Political offices
Preceded by Clyde Holding	Minister for Local Government; 1987–1990	Succeeded by Wendy Fatin
Preceded by Susan Ryan	Minister assisting the Prime Minister for the Status of Women; 1988–1990	Succeeded by Wendy Fatin

== Sources ==
- Loos, Noel; Mabo, Edward Koiki (1996). Edward Koiki Mabo. His Life and Struggle for Land Rights. Brisbane: University of Queensland Press. ISBN 978-0-7022-4979-2.
- Reynolds, Henry (1999). Why Weren't We Told? A Personal Search for the Truth About Our History. New York City: Penguin Random House. ISBN 978-0-14-027842-2.
- Reynolds, Margaret (1 August 1977). "Preliminary Assessment of Achievement Levels in an Ethnic Community School". The Aboriginal Child at School. 5 (4). Brisbane: Schonell Educational Research Centre, University of Queensland: 21–25.
- Reynolds, Margaret (1 August 1981). "The Black Community School in Townsville". Social Alternatives. 2 (2). Brisbane: Department of External Studies, University of Queensland: 64–68.
