= Michael Macklin =

Australian politician

Dr Michael Macklin
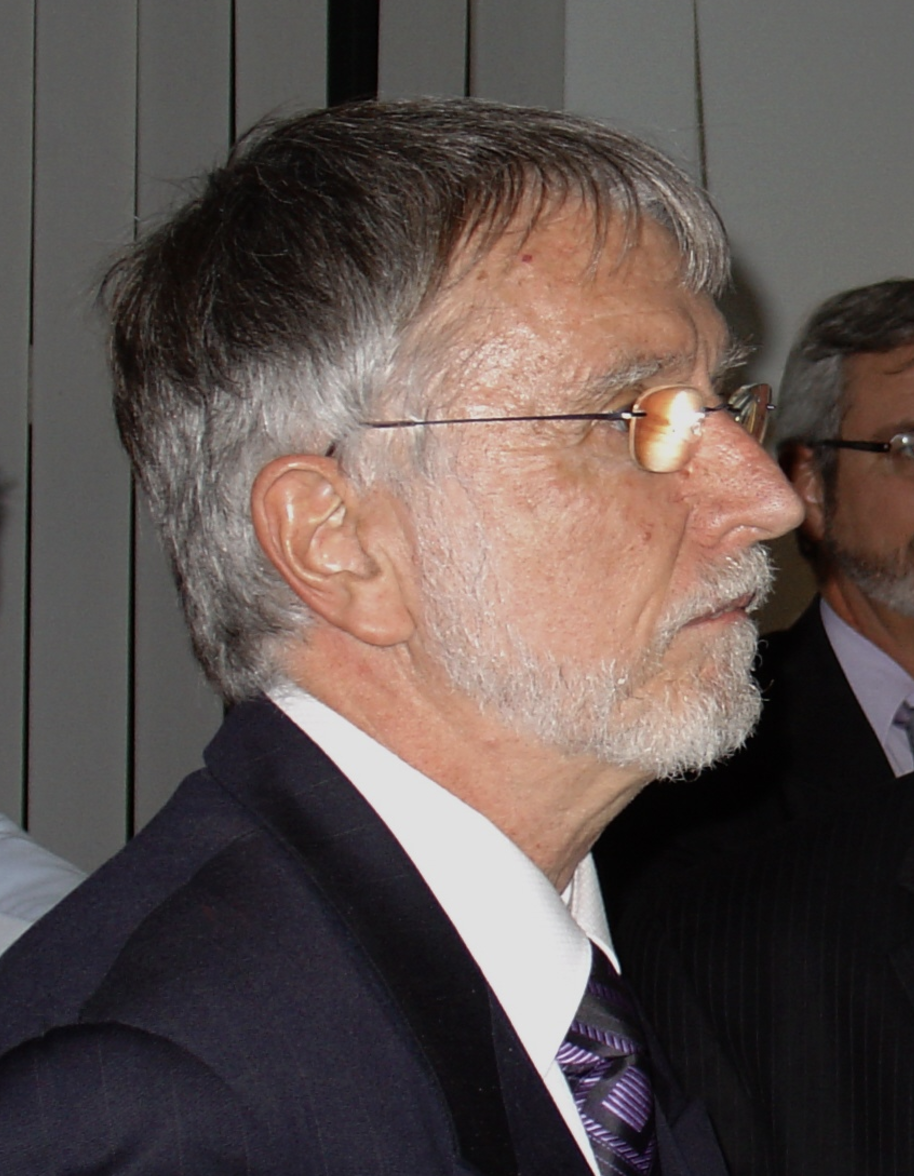
- Former Queensland Democrat senators: Michael Macklin (left) and John Cherry

Leader of the Australian Democrats—Interim
- In office 24 March 1990 – 30 June 1990
- Deputy: Jean Jenkins—Interim
- Preceded by: Janine Haines
- Succeeded by: Janet Powell

3rd Deputy Leader of the Australian Democrats
- In office 18 August 1986 – 24 March 1990
- Leader: Janine Haines
- Preceded by: Janine Haines
- Succeeded by: Jean Jenkins

Senator for Queensland
- In office 1 July 1981 – 30 June 1990
- Succeeded by: Cheryl Kernot

Personal details
- Born: Michael John Macklin; 25 February 1943 (age 83) Cricklewood, England, UK
- Party: Democrat
- Spouse: Jennifer Young (m. 1970)
- Children: 3
- Education: Marist College Ayr; St Patrick's College
- Alma mater: University of Queensland
- Occupation: School teacher (Redcliffe State High School) (Department of Education)
- Profession: Academic; Politician

Michael John Macklin (born 25 February 1943 in London) is an Australian former Franciscan friar, educator and fundraiser who was an Australian Democrats senator for Queensland (1981–1990). He later served as executive dean of the faculty of Arts, Humanities and Social Sciences at the University of New England (2002–2007).

== Early life ==
Macklin migrated as a child with his family to Australia. He grew up in Ayr in northern Queensland and finished his schooling in Sydney. Having spent a number of years as a Franciscan friar, he commenced university studies in Brisbane, became a teacher, married Jennie in December 1970, and completed Master's and PhD degrees at the University of Queensland, where he lectured in Philosophy of Education for eight years.

== Political career ==
Macklin was the founding member of the Australian Democrats in Queensland and led the party in that state from 1977 to 1980, when he was elected to the Senate.

He became the party's first whip and was elected deputy leader under Janine Haines following the retirement of Don Chipp. From 24 March to 30 June 1990, he served as interim parliamentary leader after the resignation of Haines from the Senate to contest a House of Representatives seat. He served on eleven parliamentary committees, including those having oversight of the National Crime Authority and the Australian Security Intelligence Organisation.

== Post-parliamentary career ==
Macklin undertook fundraising activities, including for the Australian Democrats. As Director of Development for the University of Queensland, he was responsible for putting fundraising on a professional basis with an annual appeal and bequest programs. He oversaw a successful capital campaign for the restoration of the Customs House, Brisbane which raised A$7.5 million in eleven months. In 1994, he was appointed inaugural CEO of Hall Chadwick Education Advisory, a specialist consultancy within a large chartered-accountancy practice and was responsible for establishing benchmarking of private school finances in Australia in conjunction with the peak body. In June 2002, he was appointed Professor and Dean of Arts at the University of New England for a five-year term ending in 2007. He has been a member of the Queensland Land and Resources Tribunal, the National Native Claims Tribunal, and the Senate Bibliographical Committee; and has published numerous papers, academic articles and books, both fiction and non-fiction.

| Preceded by Janine Haines | Leader of the Australian Democrats; 1990 | Succeeded by Janet Powell |
