= George Georges =

Australian politician (1920–2002)

Senator for Queensland
- In office 1 July 1968 – 5 June 1987

Personal details
- Born: George Georgouras; 15 April 1920 Darwin, Northern Territory
- Died: 23 September 2002 (aged 82) Canberra, Australian Capital Territory
- Party: Labor (1968–86); Independent (1986–87)

George Georges (born George Georgouras; 15 April 1920 – 23 September 2002) was an Australian politician who served as a Labor senator for Queensland from 1968 to 1986, and as an independent senator from 1986 to 1987.

== Early life ==
George Georgouras was born in Darwin, Northern Territory, on 15 April 1920, the son of Athanasios Georgouras and his wife Panayiota Stergoulis. His father emigrated to Australia from Kastellorizo, Greece, in 1912. He was educated in Ingham, Queensland, and at the South Brisbane Intermediate School before enrolling at Brisbane State High School where he was the captain of the rugby union team. Georges enrolled at the University of Queensland but did not complete his studies there. He later received further education at Brisbane North TAFE in business management.

== Career ==
Georges was a humanist and left-wing socialist jailed several times by the Queensland Government of Joh Bjelke-Petersen in the 1970s and 1980s, including during the SEQEB strike dispute, as a consequence of his activities in promoting what he saw as civil liberties and workers' rights.

In 1986 he resigned from the Labor Party to vote against legislation for the Australia Card. From 15 December 1986, he served as a senate independent after quitting the ALP. He stood as an independent candidate for the senate at the 1987 election, but failed to get re-elected, receiving 1.8% of the Queensland vote.

== Legacy ==
Georges married Gloria Wishart in 1952 and they had two children. He died in Canberra on 23 September 2002 after a long illness.
