= David MacGibbon (politician) =

Australian politician

Senator for Queensland
- In office 1 July 1978 – 30 June 1999

Personal details
- Born: 13 May 1934 (age 92) Brisbane, Queensland
- Party: Liberal Party of Australia
- Education: University of Queensland; University of London
- Occupation: Dental Surgeon, Grazier

David John MacGibbon (born 13 May 1934) is an Australian retired politician who served 21 years in the Australian Senate as a Liberal senator representing Queensland from 1978 to 1999.

== Education and early career ==
MacGibbon was born in Brisbane and grew up in Maryborough, Queensland. He was educated at the University of Queensland and University of London and served his National Service in the Australian Army before becoming a dental specialist in prosthodontics and surgery and a lecturer in dentistry. He is a Fellow of the Royal Australian College of Dental Surgeons and Fellow in Dental Surgery of the Royal College of Surgeons, England. Between 1962 and 1977, he held academic appointments at the Universities of London, Queensland and Michigan.

== Senate ==
David MacGibbon was first elected to the Australian Senate as a Liberal Senator for Queensland in 1977. He was re-elected in 1983, 1984, 1987 and 1993. He served in the Shadow Ministry, responsible for Defence Science and Personnel and Veterans Affairs (1993–94) and Customs (1989–90).

MacGibbon was a long-serving member of the Joint Senate and House of Representatives Standing Committee on Foreign Affairs Defence and Trade from 1983 to 1999 and was chairman of the committee from 1998 to 1999. He was a member of the Joint Senate and House of Representatives Statutory Committee on the Australian Security Intelligence Organisation from 1990–91 and 1996-1999 and chairman of the committee from 1996 to 1999. He served on the Senate Standing Committees for Science and the Environment (1978–83), Finance and Public Administration (1994–96), Rural and Regional Affairs and Transport (1994–96), Economics (1996–98), and Community Affairs (1999). He was appointed the Australian Parliamentary Adviser to the United Nations for the 1983 session.

MacGibbon retired from the Senate on 30 June 1999. He was succeeded by Brett Mason.

== After Politics ==
MacGibbon served as a member of the British Commonwealth Observer Group for the 2000 Zimbabwe parliamentary elections.
