= John Black (Australian politician) =

Australian politician

Senator for Queensland
- In office 1 December 1984 – 30 June 1990

Personal details
- Born: 26 January 1952 (age 74) Sydney
- Party: Australian Labor Party

John Rees Black (born 26 January 1952) is an Australian former politician. Born in Sydney, he was a journalist and industrial advocate before entering politics. In 1984, he was elected to the Australian Senate as a Labor Senator for Queensland. He remained a Senator until his defeat in 1990. John Black chaired the Senate Inquiry into "Drugs in Sport" which reported to Parliament in May 1989.This report provided the initial reference report on this important issue.

== Early life ==
Black was born in Sydney on 26 January 1952, the third of five children born to Ivy Ada (née Tanner) and Roger Foster Black. His father was an agricultural scientist and the family moved frequently when he was a child, spending time in New South Wales, Queensland and South Australia. Black completed high school in Queensland, attending Nambour State High School and Kedron State High School. He went on to attend both Flinders University and the University of Queensland, although he did not complete a degree.

== Career after politics ==
Pioneered demographic profiling of Australian political and economic groups in Australia since 1975. Developed demographic strategy for the Australian Labor Party national campaign in 1983.

In 1994, Black established a demographic research and marketing group called Australian Development Strategies of which he is Founder and Executive chairman. He has been a regular commentator on Australian politics. He has also maintained a lifelong interest in the issue of drugs in sport and has been a founding board member of the Australian Sports Anti-Doping Agency. He is a part-time Senior Member of the Australian Administrative Appeals Tribunal.

Black is currently a guest commentator for the ABC and a columnist for The Australian.
