= Stan Collard =

Australian politician (1936–2025)

Senator for Queensland
- In office 13 December 1975 – 5 June 1987

Personal details
- Born: 25 March 1936 Maleny, Queensland, Australia
- Died: 13 August 2025 (aged 89) Maleny, Queensland, Australia
- Party: National
- Spouse: Gloria Auld (m. 1958)
- Occupation: Engine driver

Stanley James Collard (25 March 1936 – 13 August 2025) was an Australian politician. He was a Senator for Queensland from 1975 to 1987, representing the National Party. He was elected as the party's Senate leader in 1985, but failed to win National Party preselection prior to the 1987 federal election owing to his opposition to the "Joh for Canberra" movement. He was a locomotive engine driver with Queensland Railways and trade unionist before his election to the Senate.

== Early life ==
Collard was born on 25 March 1936 in Maleny, Queensland. He was the oldest of three sons born to Edina née Cooke and William Alfred Collard.

Collard was raised on the family dairy farm at Maleny which his paternal grandfather had acquired in 1918. He attended primary school in Maleny and then spent two years at Nambour State High School, before leaving school to help on the farm. He later moved to Brisbane where he joined Queensland Railways as a trainee engine man.

Collard briefly ran a student hostel in Herberton before rejoining Queensland Railways in Cloncurry as a locomotive driver. He was secretary of the local branches of the Australian Federated Union of Locomotive Enginemen and the Australian Railways Union, and helped organise strike action in 1966. Collard moved to Sarina in 1971 where he drove "six-header" (six locomotive) coal trains from Bowen Basin mines to the port terminal at Hay Point. He continued to work as an engine driver until his preselection for the Senate in 1975.

== Politics ==
=== Early involvement ===
Collard joined the Country Party (later National Party) in 1959. He served as Bob Katter Sr.'s campaign director in the seat of Kennedy for three federal elections beginning in 1966.

=== Senate ===
In 1975, Collard won National Party preselection for the Senate in Queensland. Following a double dissolution, he was placed in sixth position on the Coalition's joint ticket at the 1975 federal election, winning a three-year term. He was re-elected at the 1977 and 1983 elections.

Collard served as the Nationals' whip and deputy leader in the Senate from 1981 to 1985. He replaced Doug Scott as the party's Senate leader in 1985 and was a shadow minister under Andrew Peacock and John Howard, holding the portfolios of veterans' affairs (1984–1985) and arts, heritage and the environment (1985–1987).

During the "Joh for Canberra" campaign, Collard supported the National Party maintaining its longstanding coalition with the Liberal Party, thus coming into conflict with the Nationals' Queensland state executive. He resigned from the coalition shadow ministry in April 1987, in accordance with a directive from the state executive, but was publicly critical of the "Joh for Canberra" efforts. Following another double dissolution, he failed to win preselection on the Nationals' Senate ticket at the 1987 federal election, thus bringing an end to his term as the party's Senate leader.

=== Subsequent activities ===
In January 1990, Collard unsuccessful sought National Party preselection in the House of Representatives seat of Kennedy. He was subsequently chosen as the party's candidate for Capricornia, but was defeated by incumbent Labor MP Keith Wright at the 1990 federal election.

== Later life ==
After leaving the Senate, Collard returned to his family farm. He was the president of the organising committee for the Hinkler Bicentennial Air Race, a nine-day air race honouring Bert Hinkler which concluded in Brisbane on the opening day of World Expo 88. He was also involved with Life Education Australia, serving as state president for three years and on the national board for ten years, and was deputy chairman of the Library Board of Queensland from 1996 to 1999.

== Personal life ==
In 1958, Collard married Gloria Auld, with whom he had three children. He was a lay preacher in the Methodist Church and later held administrative positions in the Uniting Church.

Collard died on 13 August 2025 at the age of 89.
