= 1987 Australian Senate election =

1987 Australian Senate elections
← 1984	11 July 1987	1990 →

All 76 seats in the Australian Senate 39 seats needed for a majority
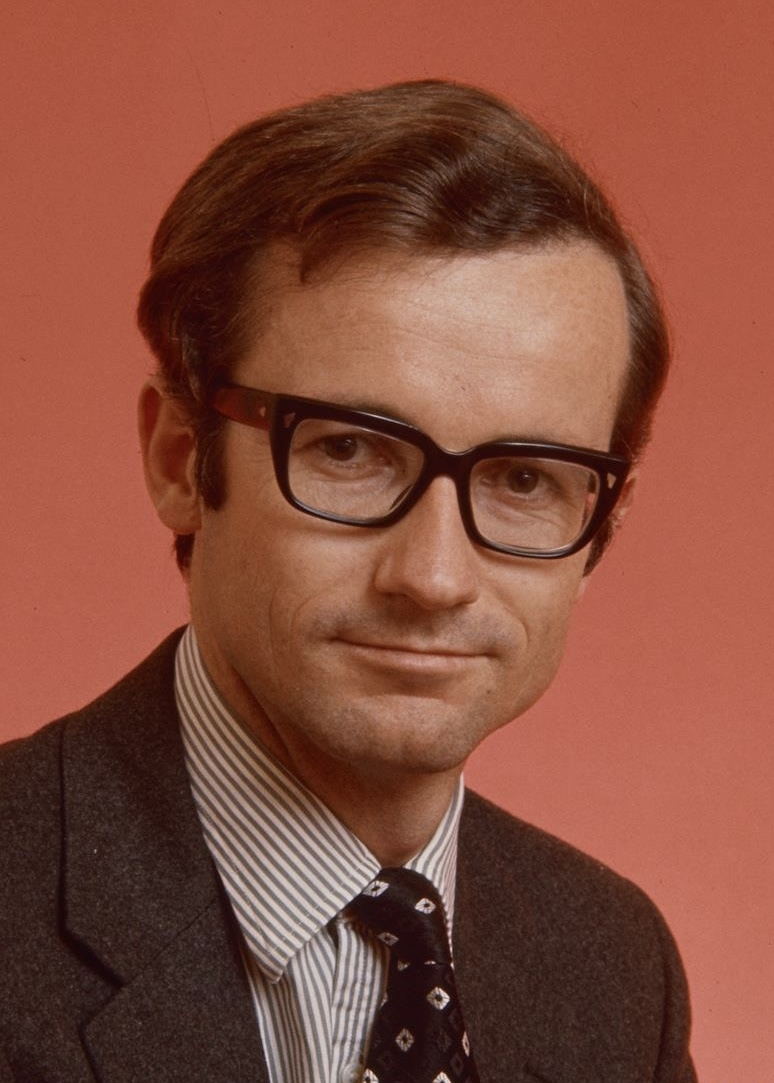

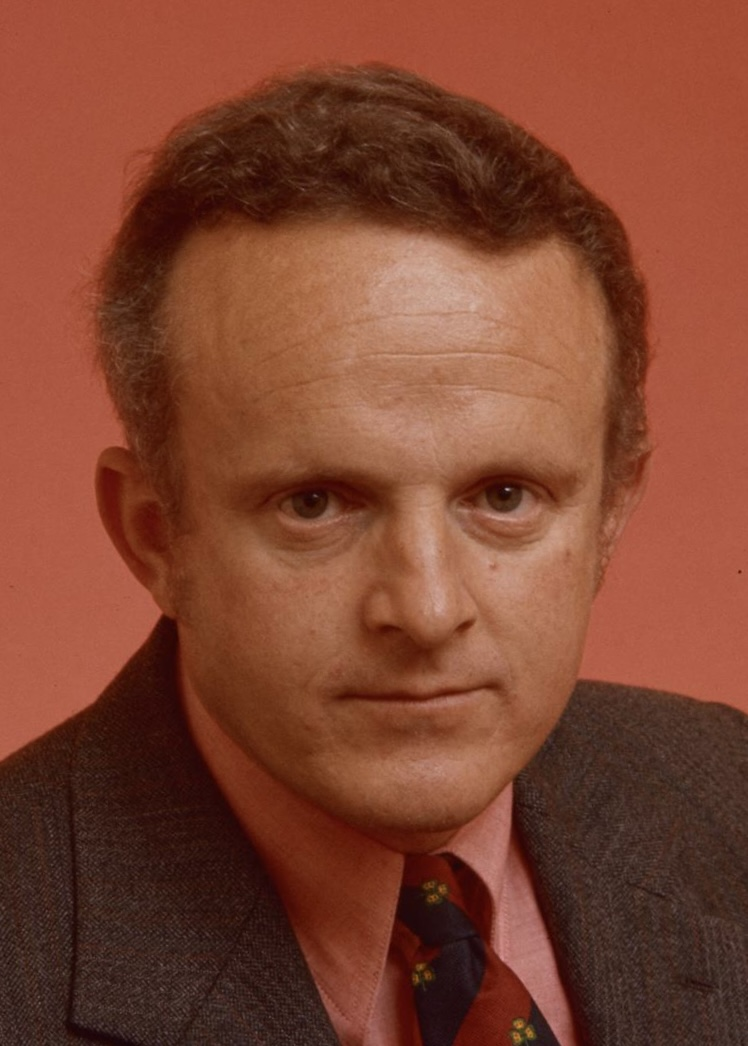

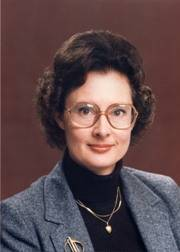

	First party	Second party
Leader	Fred Chaney	John Button
Party	Liberal–National Coalition	Labor
Leader since	11 March 1983	7 November 1980
Leader's seat	Western Australia	Victoria
Seats before	33	34
Seats after	34	32
Seat change	▲1	▼2
Popular vote	3,939,432	4,013,860
Percentage	42.04%	42.83%
Swing	▲2.50%	▲0.66%
	Third party	Fourth party
Leader	Janine Haines	Robert Wood
Party	Democrats	NDP
Leader since	18 August 1986
Leader's seat	South Australia	New South Wales (won seat)
Seats before	7	1
Seats after	7	1
Seat change	Steady	Steady
Popular vote	794,107	102,480
Percentage	8.47%	1.09%
Swing	▲0.85%	▼6.14%
- Senators elected in the 1987 federal election
Leader of the Senate before election
John Button
Labor
Elected Leader of the Senate
John Button
Labor

The following tables show state-by-state results in the Australian Senate at the 1987 federal election. This election was a Double dissolution, which means that all 12 senators from each state were up for election. Senators total 29 coalition (27 Liberal, one coalition National, one CLP), 32 Labor, one Jo Vallentine Peace Group, four non-coalition National, seven Democrats, one Nuclear Disarmament and one Independent. Territory Senators served until the next federal election. State Senator terms were nominally three or six years, backdated from 1 July 1987. The Senate used the order-elected method to allocate three- and six-year seats, despite provisions for the AEC to conduct a special recount.

== Australia ==
Senate (STV GV) — 1987–90 – Turnout 93.84% (CV) — Informal 3.54%
Party	Votes	%	Swing	Seats won	Seats held	Change
Labor	4,013,860	42.83	+0.66	32	32	▼2
Liberal	1,965,180	20.97	+0.38	23	27	Steady
Liberal–National joint ticket (NSW) (Note: Despite the split in the coalition, the joint ticket remained only in New South Wales)	1,289,888	13.76	+1.05	5	N/A	N/A
National (Note: The National includes the NT Nationals, consistent with the Parliamentary Library results, however the totals in Psephos: Adam Carr's Electoral Archive do not include the NT Nationals.)	664,394	7.09	+1.16	5	6	▲1
Country Liberal	19,970	0.21	−0.10	1	1	Steady
Democrats	794,107	8.47	+0.85	7	7	Steady
Call to Australia	136,825	1.46	−0.36			
Nuclear Disarmament (Note: Jo Vallentine had been elected in 1984 as a Nuclear Disarmament Party member, but resigned in 1985, serving out the remainder of her term as an independent.)	102,480	1.09	−6.14	1	1	Steady
Democratic Labor	50,894	0.54	+0.17			
Greens (Note: There was no national greens party in 1987. The greens total includes Greens New South Wales (32,513) and Greens South Australia (8,102).)	40,615	0.43	+0.43			
Vallentine Peace Group	40,048	0.43	+0.43	1	1	▲1
Harradine Group	37,037	0.40	+0.14	1	1	Steady
Unite Australia	24,704	0.26	+0.26			
Pensioner	17,265	0.18	–0.09			
Defence and Ex-Services	14,431	0.15	+0.15			
One Australia	13,063	0.14	+0.14			
Communist	2,456	0.03	+0.03			
Independent	144,463	1.54				
Total	9,371,681			76	76	
Invalid/blank votes	394,891	4.0	–2.8			
Turnout	9,766,571	90.5				
Registered voters	10,353,213					
Source: Federal Election Results 1949-1993

- As this was a double-dissolution election, all Senate seats were contested.

== New South Wales ==
1987 Australian federal election: Senate, New South Wales
Party	Candidate	Votes	%	±%
Quota		245,883		
Labor	1. Kerry Sibraa (elected 1); 2. Arthur Gietzelt (elected 4); 3. Graham Richardson (elected 6); 4. Bruce Childs (elected 8); 5. John Morris (elected 10); 6. Sue West; 7. Michael Sexton	1,355,792	42.4	+0.8
Liberal–National joint ticket	1. Michael Baume (Lib) (elected 2); 2. Peter Baume (Lib) (elected 5); 3. David Brownhill (Nat) (elected 7); 4. Chris Puplick (Lib) (elected 9); 5. Bronwyn Bishop (Lib) (elected 11); 6. Ralph Schulze (Nat); 7. June McPhie (Lib)	1,289,888	40.4	+3.4
Democrats	1. Paul McLean (elected 3); 2. Jenny Macleod; 3. Richard Jones; 4. Gary Chestnut	290,049	9.1	−0.6
Call to Australia	1. Elaine Nile; 2. Kevin Hume	107,859	3.4	−0.2
Nuclear Disarmament	1. Robert Wood (elected 12); 2. Irina Dunn	48,998	1.5	−8.2
Greens	1. Ian Cohen; 2. Daphne Gollan	32,513	1.0	+1.0
Group A	1. Ruth Phillips; 2. Walter Brun	30,504	0.9	+0.9
Defence and Ex-Services	1. Leslie Edwards; 2. David Herd; 3. William Tuohy; 4. Rowley McMahon	14,431	0.4	+0.4
Unite Australia	1. Alan Smith; 2. Edna Fabb	5,458	0.2	+0.2
Group I	1. Peter Consandine; 2. Brian Buckley	4,519	0.1	+0.1
Group F	1. Leon Bringolf; 2. Habib Fares; 3. Jim Donovan	4,238	0.1	+0.1
Group M	1. John Higginbotham; 2. Ian Murphy	3,795	0.1	+0.1
Group B	1. Patricia Poulos; 2. John Holley; 3. John Beasley	3,749	0.1	+0.1
Independent	Arthur Chesterfield-Evans	1,706	0.1	+0.1
Independent	Bob Spanswick	968	0.0	0.0
Independent	Ivor F	765	0.0	0.0
Independent	Phil Murray	564	0.0	0.0
Independent	Nick Jones	270	0.0	0.0
Independent	Jame Smith-New	234	0.0	0.0
Independent	Keith Larkings	88	0.0	0.0
Independent	James Goody	86	0.0	0.0
Total formal votes		3,196,474	95.1	+0.7
Informal votes		164,001	4.9	−0.7
Turnout		3,360,475	94.5	+0.1

#	Senator	Party
1	Kerry Sibraa	Labor
2	Michael Baume	Liberal
3	Paul McLean	Democrat
4	Arthur Gietzelt	Labor
5	Peter Baume	Liberal
6	Graham Richardson	Labor
7	David Brownhill	National
8	Bruce Childs	Labor
9	Chris Puplick	Liberal
10	John Morris	Labor
11	Bronwyn Bishop	Liberal
12	Robert Wood	NDP

== Victoria ==
1987 Australian federal election: Senate, Victoria
Party	Candidate	Votes	%	±%
Quota		189,970		
Labor	1. John Button (elected 1); 2. Gareth Evans (elected 4); 3. Olive Zakharov (elected 6); 4. Robert Ray (elected 8); 5. Barney Cooney (elected 10); 6. John Halfpenny; 7. Carole Taylor	1,086,513	44.0	−0.1
Liberal	1. Austin Lewis (elected 2); 2. Jim Short (elected 5); 3. Richard Alston (elected 7); 4. David Hamer (elected 9); 5. Kay Patterson (elected 12); 6. John Wyld; 7. John Goodfellow; 8. John Riggall; 9. Severn Clarke	878,899	35.6	+1.4
Democrats	1. Janet Powell (elected 3); 2. Sid Spindler; 3. Ken Peak; 4. Harold Fraser; 5. Peter Allen	211,043	8.5	+1.6
National	1. Julian McGauran (elected 11); 2. Noel Maughan; 3. Les Flintoff	140,143	5.7	+1.7
Democratic Labor	1. John Mulholland; 2. Gloria Brook	50,894	2.0	+0.6
Call to Australia	1. Al Watson; 2. Loretto Brennan; 3. John Easton	28,966	1.2	−0.1
Nuclear Disarmament	1. Aldo Penbrook; 2. Nik Dow	28,352	1.1	−6.2
Pensioner	1. Neil McKay; 2. Rosamond Ewan	17,265	0.7	−0.1
Unite Australia	1. John Siddons; 2. Ian Price; 3. Lisa Harris	11,213	0.5	+0.5
Group B	1. Bill Hartley; 2. Laurene Dietrich; 3. David Kerin; 4. Rola Haidar	4,243	0.2	+0.2
Group L	1. Laurie Dunlop; 2. Simon Hood	4,113	0.2	+0.2
Group F	1. David Caccianiga; 2. Bill Thiele	2,145	0.1	+0.1
Group O	1. Dino de Marchi; 2. Ineke Black	2,086	0.1	+0.1
Group J	1. Lisa King; 2. Kevin O'Connell	1,729	0.1	+0.1
Group K	1. Alan Miller; 2. Maria Bennett	1,320	0.1	+0.1
Independent	Kym Roylance	510	0.0	0.0
Independent	Abraham Abdalla	172	0.0	0.0
Total formal votes		2,469,606	96.0	+0.2
Informal votes		102,382	4.0	−0.2
Turnout		2,571,988	95.3	−0.1

#	Senator	Party
1	John Button	Labor
2	Austin Lewis	Liberal
3	Janet Powell	Democrat
4	Gareth Evans	Labor
5	Jim Short	Liberal
6	Olive Zakharov	Labor
7	Richard Alston	Liberal
8	Robert Ray	Labor
9	David Hamer	Liberal
10	Barney Cooney	Labor
11	Julian McGauran	National
12	Kay Patterson	Liberal

== Queensland ==
1987 Australian federal election: Senate, Queensland
Party	Candidate	Votes	%	±%
Quota		117,721		
Labor	1. Margaret Reynolds (elected 1); 2. Mal Colston (elected 4); 3. Gerry Jones (elected 7); 4. John Black (elected 9); 5. Bryant Burns (elected 10); 6. Jack Camp; 7. Glenevie Jensen	643,094	42.0	+2.3
National	1. Flo Bjelke-Petersen (elected 2); 2. John Stone (elected 5); 3. Ron Boswell (elected 8); 4. Glen Sheil (elected 12); 5. George Cowan; 6. Vicky Kippin; 7. Ann Garms; 8. Bruce Laming	439,618	28.7	−0.2
Liberal	1. David MacGibbon (elected 3); 2. Warwick Parer (elected 6); 3. Gary Neat; 4. Cassie Solomon; 5. Brian Taylor; 6. Jane Williamson	275,085	18.0	+0.6
Democrats	1. Michael Macklin (elected 11); 2. Cheryl Kernot; 3. Norman Johnson; 4. Anthony Walters	115,456	7.5	−1.7
Independent	George Georges	26,795	1.8	+1.8
Nuclear Disarmament	1. John Jones; 2. Brian Dunsford	17,411	1.1	−3.3
Group A	1. Barry Weedon; 2. Kathleen Wacker	6,692	0.4	+0.4
Independent	Ron Smith	3,410	0.2	+0.2
Unite Australia	1. Ron Alford; 2. Geoff Fawthrop	1,638	0.1	+0.1
Group C	1. Ray Ferguson; 2. Jake Haub	737	0.0	0.0
Independent	John Bolt	424	0.0	0.0
Total formal votes		1,530,360	96.9	−0.1
Informal votes		49,609	3.1	+0.1
Turnout		1,579,969	92.5	−0.9

#	Senator	Party
1	Margaret Reynolds	Labor
2	Flo Bjelke-Petersen	National
3	David MacGibbon	Liberal
4	Mal Colston	Labor
5	John Stone	National
6	Warwick Parer	Liberal
7	Gerry Jones	Labor
8	Ron Boswell	National
9	John Black	Labor
10	Bryant Burns	Labor
11	Michael Macklin	Democrats
12	Glen Sheil	National

== Western Australia ==
1987 Australian federal election: Senate, Western Australia
Party	Candidate	Votes	%	±%
Quota		63,668		
Labor	1. Peter Walsh (elected 1); 2. Patricia Giles (elected 3); 3. Peter Cook (elected 5); 4. Jim McKiernan (elected 7); 5. Michael Beahan (elected 9); 6. Chris Evans; 7. Ed Dermer	354,328	42.8	−0.5
Liberal	1. Fred Chaney (elected 2); 2. Peter Durack (elected 4); 3. Sue Knowles (elected 6); 4. Noel Crichton-Browne (elected 8); 5. John Panizza (elected 10); 6. Alan Eggleston; 7. Cam Tinley	324,028	39.1	−1.6
Democrats	1. Jean Jenkins (elected 11); 2. Jack Evans	47,534	5.7	+1.1
National	1. James MacDonald; 2. Glenice Sanders; 3. Ron Aitkenhead; 4. Beverley Poor	45,787	5.5	+3.7
Vallentine Peace Group	1. Jo Vallentine (elected 12); 2. Louise Duxbury	40,048	4.8	+4.8
One Australia Movement	1. Cedric Jacobs; 2. Don Jackson; 3. Ed Robertson	13,063	1.6	+1.6
Unite Australia	1. Allan McMullen; 2. Norm Heslington	1,620	0.2	+0.2
Independent	Frank Nesci	426	0.1	+0.1
Independent	Mark Pallister	354	0.0	0.0
Independent	Jack Flanigan	333	0.0	0.0
Independent	Gordon McColl	162	0.0	0.0
Total formal votes		827,683	96.7	+1.4
Informal votes		28,284	3.3	−1.4
Turnout		855,976	94.4	+0.2

#	Senator	Party
1	Peter Walsh	Labor
2	Fred Chaney	Liberal
3	Patricia Giles	Labor
4	Peter Durack	Liberal
5	Peter Cook	Labor
6	Sue Knowles	Liberal
7	Jim McKiernan	Labor
8	Noel Crichton-Browne	Liberal
9	Michael Beahan	Labor
10	John Panizza	Liberal
11	Jean Jenkins	Democrats
12	Jo Vallentine	VPG

== South Australia ==
1987 Australian federal election: Senate, South Australia
Party	Candidate	Votes	%	±%
Quota		65,927		
Labor	1. Dominic Foreman (elected 1); 2. Nick Bolkus (elected 4); 3. Graham Maguire (elected 6); 4. Rosemary Crowley (elected 8); 5. Chris Schacht (elected 10); 6. Vic Heron; 7. Rosalie McDonald	354,747	41.4	−0.3
Liberal	1. Tony Messner (elected 2); 2. Amanda Vanstone (elected 5); 3. Robert Hill (elected 7); 4. Grant Chapman (elected 9); 5. Baden Teague (elected 11); 6. Michele Mercurio; 7. Ivan Venning	328,039	38.3	+0.8
Democrats	1. Janine Haines (elected 3); 2. John Coulter (elected 12); 3. Meg Lees; 4. Ian McLiesh; 5. Peter Vervoorn	95,831	11.2	0.0
National	1. Bill Wright; 2. Neville Agars; 3. Mike Rogers; 4. Jessie Taylor; 5. Bob Brown; 6. Clifford Boyd	29,954	3.5	+2.2
Independent	Don Jessop	25,876	3.0	+3.0
Greens	1. Ally Fricker; 2. Jules Davison	8,102	0.9	+0.9
Group A	1. Creston Magasdi; 2. Reg McColl	5,715	0.7	+0.7
Unite Australia	1. David Vigor; 2. Nick Theologou; 3. Patricia Prowse; 4. Maxwell Elphick	4,775	0.6	+0.6
Communist	1. John Wishart; 2. Linda Gale	2,456	0.3	+0.3
Group F	1. Tom Towle; 2. Ellen Towle	788	0.1	+0.1
Independent	Bill Forster	276	0.0	0.0
Independent	Rob Robertson	199	0.0	0.0
Independent	Robert Worth	145	0.0	0.0
Independent	John Out	47	0.0	0.0
Independent	Helen Launer	44	0.0	0.0
Independent	Syd Plenty	29	0.0	0.0
Independent	Stephen Bailey	19	0.0	0.0
Total formal votes		857,042	96.2	+1.6
Informal votes		33,514	3.8	−1.6
Turnout		890,556	94.5	−0.7

#	Senator	Party
1	Dominic Foreman	Labor
2	Tony Messner	Liberal
3	Janine Haines	Democrats
4	Nick Bolkus	Labor
5	Amanda Vanstone	Liberal
6	Graham Maguire	Labor
7	Robert Hill	Liberal
8	Rosemary Crowley	Labor
9	Grant Chapman	Liberal
10	Chris Schacht	Labor
11	Baden Teague	Liberal
12	John Coulter	Democrats

== Tasmania ==
1987 Australian federal election: Senate, Tasmania
Party	Candidate	Votes	%	±%
Quota		21,451		
Labor	1. Michael Tate (elected 1); 2. John Coates (elected 4); 3. Terry Aulich (elected 6); 4. Ray Devlin (elected 8); 5. John Devereux (elected 10); 6. Janet Cooper; 7. John Green	113,638	40.8	−0.8
Liberal	1. Brian Archer (elected 2); 2. Shirley Walters (elected 5); 3. John Watson (elected 7); 4. Jocelyn Newman (elected 9); 5. Paul Calvert (elected 11); 6. Vince Smith; 7. Peter Aldridge	108,039	38.7	−2.0
Harradine Group	1. Brian Harradine (elected 3); 2. Colin Sacco	37,037	13.3	+4.5
Democrats	1. Norm Sanders (elected 12); 2. Nick Goldie; 3. Isla Macgregor	18,841	6.8	+0.7
Independent	Michael Mansell	1,102	0.4	+0.4
Independent	Laurie Heathorn	203	0.1	+0.1
Total formal votes		278,860	96.2	+2.0
Informal votes		11,119	3.8	−2.0
Turnout		289,979	96.4	+0.6

#	Senator	Party
1	Michael Tate	Labor
2	Brian Archer	Liberal
3	Brian Harradine	Independent
4	John Coates	Labor
5	Shirley Walters	Liberal
6	Terry Aulich	Labor
7	John Watson	Liberal
8	Ray Devlin	Labor
9	Jocelyn Newman	Liberal
10	John Devereux	Labor
11	Paul Calvert	Liberal
12	Norm Sanders	Democrats

== Australian Capital Territory ==
1987 Australian federal election: Senate, Australian Capital Territory
Party	Candidate	Votes	%	±%
Quota		50,047		
Labor	1. Susan Ryan (elected 1); 2. Barry Reid	74,876	49.9	+5.5
Liberal	1. Margaret Reid (elected 2); 2. Bill Stefaniak	51,090	34.0	+2.1
Democrats	1. Andrew Freeman; 2. Geoff Quayle	15,353	10.2	+1.0
Nuclear Disarmament	1. Michael Denborough; 2. Margaret Matthews	7,719	5.1	−5.2
Independent	Leonard Munday	433	0.3	+0.3
Independent	David Ash	433	0.3	+0.3
Independent	John Murray	234	0.2	+0.2
Total formal votes		150,138	97.7	+1.1
Informal votes		3,672	2.3	−1.1
Turnout		153,810	94.5	+0.6

#	Senator	Party
1	Susan Ryan	Labor
2	Margaret Reid	Liberal

== Northern Territory ==
1987 Australian federal election: Senate, Northern Territory
Party	Candidate	Votes	%	±%
Quota		20,506		
Labor	1. Bob Collins (elected 1); 2. Lyn Reid	30,872	50.2	+4.5
Country Liberal	1. Grant Tambling (elected 2); 2. Ian Towns	19,970	32.5	−16.6
NT Nationals	1. Jim Petrich; 2. Joan Small	8,892	14.5	+14.5
Group C	1. Lyn Allen; 2. Catherin Paul	1,632	2.7	+2.7
Independent	Yuri Juriev	151	0.2	+0.2
Total formal votes		61,517	96.3	−0.5
Informal votes		2,374	3.7	+0.5
Turnout		63,891	79.9	−5.6

#	Senator	Party
1	Bob Collins	Labor
2	Grant Tambling	CLP

== See also ==
- 1987 Australian federal election
- Candidates of the 1987 Australian federal election
- Members of the Australian Senate, 1987–1990
