= Candidates of the 1987 Australian federal election =

This article provides information on candidates who stood for the 1987 Australian federal election. The election was held on 11 July 1987.

== Retiring Members and Senators ==
=== Labor ===
- Len Keogh MP (Bowman, Qld)
- Ralph Jacobi MP (Hawker, SA)
- Senator Ruth Coleman (WA)
- Senator Ron Elstob (SA)
- Senator Gordon McIntosh (WA)
- Senator Ted Robertson (NT)

=== Liberal ===
- Peter Coleman MP (Wentworth, NSW)
- Peter Drummond MP (Forrest, WA)
- Senator Sir John Carrick (NSW)
- Senator Dame Margaret Guilfoyle (Vic)
- Senator Reg Withers (WA)

=== National ===
- Senator Stan Collard (Qld)

=== Country Liberal ===
- Paul Everingham MP (Northern Territory, NT)
- Senator Bernie Kilgariff (NT)

=== Democrats ===
- Senator Colin Mason (NSW)

=== Independent ===
- Senator Michael Townley (Tas) – elected as Liberal

== House of Representatives ==
Sitting members at the time of the election are shown in bold text. Successful candidates are highlighted in the relevant colour. Where there is possible confusion, an asterisk (*) is also used.

=== Australian Capital Territory ===
Electorate	Held by	Labor candidate	Liberal candidate	Democrats candidate	NDP candidate	Other candidates
Canberra	Labor	**Ros Kelly**	John Louttit	Frances English	Chris Warren	Bev Cains (AFM); John Farrell (Ind)
Fraser	Labor	**John Langmore**	Ian Farrow	Peter Hayes	Gareth Smith	Emile Brunoro (Ind); Dawn Casley-Smith (AFM); Larry O'Sullivan (Ind); Kevin Wise (Ind)

=== New South Wales ===
Electorate	Held by	Labor candidate	Coalition candidate	Democrats candidate	Other candidates
Banks	Labor	**John Mountford**	Max Parker (Lib)	Monty Green	
Barton	Labor	**Gary Punch**	Bob Gemmell (Lib)		Charles Bellchambers (Ind); Jim McLean (Ind)
Bennelong	Liberal	Beverley Sharpe	**John Howard** (Lib)	Paul Taylor	Stephen Davidson (Ind); John Dawson (Ind)
Berowra	Liberal	Sue Deane	**Harry Edwards** (Lib)	Peter Markham	
Blaxland	Labor	**Paul Keating**	Andrew Thorn (Lib)	John Young	Philip Black (Ind); Paul Keating (Ind); Tony Leitao (Ind); Frank Rayner (Ind); Kaye Tucker (Ind)
Bradfield	Liberal	Michael Fry	**David Connolly** (Lib)	Fiona Richardson	
Calare	Labor	**David Simmons**	Mick English (Lib); Stewart Hespe (Nat)	Bob Dolton	Eve Buscombe (Ind)
Charlton	Labor	**Bob Brown**	Mollie Blake (Lib)	Lyn Godfrey	Vishnu Chaudhary (Ind)
Chifley	Labor	**Roger Price**	Paul Conlon (Lib)	Philip Goldhagen	Cheryl Crisp (Ind)
Cook	Liberal	Michael Addison	**Don Dobie** (Lib)	Mark Freeman	
Cowper	National	John Murphy	**Garry Nehl** (Nat)	Dorothy Thompson	Max Austin (Ind); David Rees (Ind)
Cunningham	Labor	**Stewart West**	Jeff Thomson (Lib)	Ray Dargavel	Rudy Pasara (Ind)
Dobell	Labor	**Michael Lee**	Les Nunn (Lib)	Graeme Ward	
Dundas	Liberal	Veronica Husted	**Philip Ruddock** (Lib)	Robert Springett	
Eden-Monaro	Labor	**Jim Snow**	Peter Cochran (Nat); David Evans (Lib)		Horst Kirchner (UAP); John McGlynn (Ind)
Farrer	National	Barry Marks	**Tim Fischer** (Nat)		Ray Brooks (Ind)
Fowler	Labor	**Ted Grace**	Jeff Fishlock (Lib)	Robert Neesam	
Gilmore	National	John Wright	**John Sharp** (Nat)	Alan Blackshaw	Reen Dixon (Ind)
Grayndler	Labor	**Leo McLeay**	Karl Tartak (Lib)	Peter Hennessy	Nick Papanikitas (Ind); Jack Shanahan (Ind)
Greenway	Labor	**Russ Gorman**	Warren Musgrave (Lib)		
Gwydir	National	Trevor Elks	**Ralph Hunt** (Nat)		Lloyd Fleming (Ind)
Hughes	Labor	**Robert Tickner**	Cliff Mason (Lib)	Paul Terrett	
Hume	Liberal	Rod Milliken	**Wal Fife** (Lib)	Scott Milne	Jim Eldridge (Ind); David Herald (Ind); Duncan Marshall (NDP)
Hunter	Labor	**Eric Fitzgibbon**	Graham Dunkley (Lib); John Turner (Nat)	Maureen Simpson	
Kingsford-Smith	Labor	**Lionel Bowen**	Carolyn O'Connor (Lib)	Philippa Leehy	
Lindsay	Labor	**Ross Free**	Glynis Hayne (Lib)	Michael Gregory	Ian Perry (Ind)
Lowe	Labor	**Michael Maher**	Bob Woods (Lib)		Tony Farrell (UAP); George Turner (Ind)
Lyne	National	Garry Worth	**Bruce Cowan** (Nat)	John Aitken	
Macarthur	Labor	**Stephen Martin**	Ron Forrester (Lib)	Meg Sampson	
Mackellar	Liberal	Eileen Blackmore	**Jim Carlton** (Lib)	Graeme Maclennan	Maurice Foley (Ind)
Macquarie	Liberal	David March	**Alasdair Webster** (Lib)	Bruce Forbes	
Mitchell	Liberal	Geoff Robinson	**Alan Cadman** (Lib)		
Newcastle	Labor	**Allan Morris**	Alan Taggart (Lib)	Rae Rendle	George Keegan (Ind)
New England	National	Joe Horan	**Ian Sinclair** (Nat)	Eunice Moody	Lance Baldwin (Ind); Bevan O'Regan (Ind)
North Sydney	Liberal	Eddie Britt	**John Spender** (Lib)	Rod Dominish	
Page	National	Trevor Ellem	**Ian Robinson** (Nat)	Ivor Brown	William Egerton (Ind)
Parkes	National	Graham Lund	**Michael Cobb** (Nat)	Gloria Collison	Max Murford (Ind); Bill O'Donnell (Ind)
Parramatta	Labor	**John Brown**	Paul Hamer (Lib)	Rodney Levett	
Phillip	Labor	**Jeannette McHugh**	Ray Collins (Lib)	Karin Sowada	Fred Brinkman (Ind)
Prospect	Labor	**Dick Klugman**	Robert Ingram (Lib)	William Utterson	Sam Barone (Ind)
Reid	Labor	**Tom Uren**	Lynne McDowell (Lib)	John Roveen	
Richmond	National	Klaas Woldring	**Charles Blunt** (Nat)	Anne Brown	Mac Nicolson (Ind)
Riverina-Darling	National	Peter Black	**Noel Hicks** (Nat)		
Robertson	Labor	**Barry Cohen**	Paul St Clair (Lib)	Glenice Griffiths	
Shortland	Labor	**Peter Morris**	Milton Caine (Lib)	Derek McCabe	
St George	Labor	**Stephen Dubois**	Gary Rush (Lib)	Garry Dalrymple	Brian Compton (Ind)
Sydney	Labor	**Peter Baldwin**	Les Morka (Lib)	William Cole	Jack Mundey (Ind); Vito Radice (Ind)
Throsby	Labor	**Colin Hollis**	Neville Fredericks (Lib); David Wood (Nat)	Greg Butler	
Warringah	Liberal	Ian Douglas	**Michael MacKellar** (Lib)	Christian Widmair	
Wentworth	Liberal	Anne-Maree Whitaker	John Hewson (Lib)	Yvonne Jayawardena	
Werriwa	Labor	**John Kerin**	David Brock (Lib)		

=== Northern Territory ===
Electorate	Held by	Labor candidate	CLP candidate	NT Nationals candidates
Northern Territory	CLP	Warren Snowdon	Peter Paroulakis	Bob Liddle

=== Queensland ===
Electorate	Held by	Labor candidate	Liberal candidate	National candidate	Democrats candidate	Other candidates
Bowman	Labor	Con Sciacca	Andrew Crowe	Bill Barry-Cotter	Diana Taylor	Barry Cullen (Ind)
Brisbane	Labor	**Manfred Cross**	David Drake	Cliff Newman	Michael van Prooyen	William Kenney (Ind)
Capricornia	Labor	**Keith Wright**	Tom Young	Ted Price		J. S. Page (NDP)
Dawson	National	Bill Welch	Paul Pottinger	**Ray Braithwaite**		
Fadden	Liberal	Peter Wilson	**David Jull**	Peter Robinson	Kenneth Davies	
Fairfax	National	Alison Smith	Joy Brannelly	**Evan Adermann**	Brian Stockwell	
Fisher	National	Michael Lavarch	Ian Mutch	**Peter Slipper**	Glen Spicer	
Forde	Liberal	Mary Crawford	**David Watson**	Tony Philbrick	Sheila Rieff	
Griffith	Labor	**Ben Humphreys**	Wayne Black	Sean Cousins	Lance Winter	
Groom	National	Linda Dwyer	Alexander Munro	**Tom McVeigh**	Mark Carew	
Herbert	Labor	**Ted Lindsay**	Rosemary Pavey	Jose Goicoechea	Paul Swanton	
Hinkler	National	Brian Courtice	John Williams	**Bryan Conquest**	Geoff Boshell	
Kennedy	National	James Byrne	Ross Cooper	**Bob Katter**		
Leichhardt	Labor	**John Gayler**	Ronald Barry	Kevin Byrne	Wilfred Tapau	
Lilley	Labor	**Elaine Darling**	John Gates	Andrew Brown		
McPherson	Liberal	Pat Stern	**Peter White**	Max McMahon	Yvonne Stoelhorst	
Maranoa	National	Raymond Paroz	Bruce Christie	**Ian Cameron**	Richard McCarthy	
Moncrieff	Liberal	Robert Boyce	**Kathy Sullivan**	Lester Hughes	George Spencer	
Moreton	Liberal	Garrie Gibson	**Don Cameron**	Peter Freckleton	Manfred Willinger	
Oxley	Labor	**Bill Hayden**	Janice Akroyd	Barry Hoffensetz	John Loughney	
Petrie	Liberal	Gary Johns	**John Hodges**	Gerard Cross	Isobel Robinson	
Rankin	Labor	**David Beddall**	John Patterson	Peter Jorgenson; Gerard Walsh	Miriam Cope	Terri Cavanagh (Ind); Michael Dunne (Ind)
Ryan	Liberal	Fleur Yuile	**John Moore**	Steve Walters	Daphne Woodhouse	
Wide Bay	National	Andrew Foley	Can Primavera	**Clarrie Millar**	Ray Barry	

=== South Australia ===
Electorate	Held by	Labor candidate	Liberal candidate	Democrats candidate	National candidate	UAP candidate	Other candidates
Adelaide	Labor	**Chris Hurford**	Peter Panagaris	Chris Wurm	Bryan Stokes	Charles Shahin	Graham Smith (CPA)
Barker	Liberal	Bill Hender	**James Porter**	Glenn Taylor	Max Vawser	Tom Giannouklas	Allan Bannister (Ind); Harry Pfeuffer (Ind)
Bonython	Labor	**Neal Blewett**	Bernard Buechner	Colin Maas	Cathryn Linedale	John Longhurst	
Boothby	Liberal	Jayne Taylor	**Steele Hall**	Margaret-Ann Williams	Clarrie Dietman	Kevin Angove	
Grey	Labor	**Lloyd O'Neil**	Russell Reid	Chris James	Robin Dixon-Thompson	Leonce Kealy	
Hawker	Labor	Elizabeth Harvey	Kim Jacobs	Graham Pamount	David Dwyer	Keith Draper	
Hindmarsh	Labor	**John Scott**	Barry Lewis	Jim Mitchell	Glenn Jarvis	Stewart Clarke	Sofia Mavrogeorgis (Ind)
Kingston	Labor	**Gordon Bilney**	Richard Noble	Colin Miller	Gerald Larkin	Michael Prowse	
Makin	Labor	**Peter Duncan**	Neville Joyce	Sandra Kanck	Natalie Richardson	Kenneth Taplin	A. Wunderlich (Ind)
Mayo	Liberal	Delia Skorin	**Alexander Downer**	Merilyn Pedrick	Wesley Glanville	Dorothy McGregor-Day	George Gater (Ind)
Port Adelaide	Labor	**Mick Young**	Barry Blundell	Derek Ball	Rod Scarborough	Bob Manhire	John Buik (Ind); Brian Rooney (Ind)
Sturt	Liberal	Phil Robins	**Ian Wilson**	Karen Coleman	Loma Silsbury	Graeme Matthews	
Wakefield	Liberal	Susan Stephens	**Neil Andrew**	Barbara Barlow	Bill Adams	Anne Hausler	

=== Tasmania ===
Electorate	Held by	Labor candidate	Liberal candidate	Democrats candidate
Bass	Liberal	Richard Taylor	**Warwick Smith**	Michael Preece
Braddon	Liberal	David Currie	**Chris Miles**	
Denison	Liberal	Duncan Kerr	**Michael Hodgman**	Robert Bell
Franklin	Liberal	Nick Sherry	**Bruce Goodluck**	Patsy Harmsen
Lyons	Liberal	Dick Adams	**Max Burr**	Liz Holloway

=== Victoria ===
Electorate	Held by	Labor candidate	Liberal candidate	National candidate	Democrats candidate	Other candidate
Aston	Labor	**John Saunderson**	Gordon Ashley	Hugh Gurney	Jan Bricknell	
Ballarat	Labor	**John Mildren**	John Ronan	John Boland	Phil Henseleit	Martin Greany (Ind)
Batman	Labor	**Brian Howe**	Ron Dunn		Jan Roberts	Darren Chapman (Ind); Sue Phillips (Ind)
Bendigo	Labor	**John Brumby**	John Radford	Ron Best	Kaye Swanton	Sharyne O'Grady (Ind); John Somerville (Ind)
Bruce	Liberal	Patrick Robinson	**Ken Aldred**		Kate Carr	Terence Pooley (UAP)
Burke	Labor	**Neil O'Keefe**	Peter Dale	Barry McLeod	Susan Mullington	
Calwell	Labor	**Andrew Theophanous**	Chris Dimitrijevic	Ivan Pavlekovich-Smith	Louise Stewart	
Casey	Liberal	David McKenzie	**Bob Halverson**	Roy Haffenden	Chris Mar	Flo Madden (PPA)
Chisholm	Labor	**Helen Mayer**	Michael Wooldridge	Edward Wajsbrem	Fran Robbins	Barry Gration (Ind); Ernest Rodeck (UAP)
Corangamite	Liberal	Ian Caldwell	**Stewart McArthur**	John McDonald	Rob Mann	
Corio	Labor	**Gordon Scholes**	Patrick Conheady		Greta Pearce	Tom Davies (Ind); Danielle Dixon (Ind)
Deakin	Liberal	Madelyn Myatt	**Julian Beale**		Marcus Bosch	Gil Speirs (Ind); Rick Wright (UAP)
Dunkley	Labor	**Bob Chynoweth**	Tom Warwick		Robyn Kirby	Les Johnson (Ind); Andrew Murray (PPA); Chris van Lieshout (Ind)
Flinders	Liberal	Tony Lack	**Peter Reith**		Andrew Suttie	Noel Maud (Ind); Jonathan Miln (PPA)
Gellibrand	Labor	**Ralph Willis**	Tim Warner		Susan Holmes	James Doughney (SWP); Rosalba Vicari (Ind)
Gippsland	National	Zona Child	Grant Pearce	**Peter McGauran**	Pierre Fourcier	Rod Anderson (Ind)
Goldstein	Liberal	Murray McInnes	**Ian Macphee**		Maureen Boaler	Tiger Casley (Ind); Michael Rowe (DLP)
Henty	Labor	**Joan Child**	Rudi Michelson		Paul Hegarty	
Higgins	Liberal	Barbara Higgins	**Roger Shipton**		Clive Jackson	
Holt	Labor	**Michael Duffy**	Janice Bateman		Geoff Herbert	
Hotham	Labor	**Lewis Kent**	Peter McCall		Len de Koning	
Indi	Liberal	Danny Walsh	**Ewen Cameron**	Philip Pullar		Brian Lumsden (PPA); Rob Taylor (Ind)
Isaacs	Labor	**David Charles**	Rod Atkinson	Bill Buchanan	Maxine Aspinall	Linda Ely (Ind)
Jagajaga	Labor	**Peter Staples**	John Pasquarelli	Laurie Kirwan	Howard McCallum	Lynette Manning (Ind)
Kooyong	Liberal	Lindsay Woods	**Andrew Peacock**		Peter Taft	Margaret Cole (UAP)
Lalor	Labor	**Barry Jones**	Darren Farquhar		Heather Jeffcoat	
La Trobe	Labor	**Peter Milton**	Bob Charles		John Benton	
Mallee	National	Linda Freedman	Adrian Kidd	**Peter Fisher**		Neil Lehmann (Ind)
Maribyrnong	Labor	**Alan Griffiths**	Victor Rudewych		David Mackay	Mark Beshara (DLP)
McEwen	Labor	**Peter Cleeland**	David Millie	Andrew Coller	Doug Lorman	Robert Wilson (Ind)
McMillan	Labor	**Barry Cunningham**	John Kiely	Pat O'Brien	Ross Ollquist	Anne Lorraine (Ind); Thomas Walsh (Ind)
Melbourne	Labor	**Gerry Hand**	Frank Randle		Peter La Franchi	James Ferrari (Ind)
Melbourne Ports	Labor	**Clyde Holding**	Allan Paull		Di Bretherton	Alan Brown (Ind)
Menzies	Liberal	Ivana Csar	**Neil Brown**		Marjorie White	Bruce Plain (UAP)
Murray	National	Mark Anderson	Brendan Norden	**Bruce Lloyd**	Ralph Linford	John Hargreaves (Ind)
Scullin	Labor	**Harry Jenkins**	Mike Kabos		John Privitelli	
Streeton	Labor	**Tony Lamb**	Russell Broadbent	Ken Trembath	Rika Mason	Tessa Cunningham (UAP)
Wannon	Liberal	Kevin Watt	**David Hawker**		Julie Jennings	
Wills	Labor	**Bob Hawke**	Olga Venables		Ken Eley	Fast Bucks (Ind); Ian Sykes (Ind); Lyn Teather (Ind)

=== Western Australia ===
Electorate	Held by	Labor candidate	Liberal candidate	National candidate	Democrats candidate	Independent candidate
Brand	Labor	**Wendy Fatin**	Bernie Masters	Peter Bass	John Willis	
Canning	Labor	**George Gear**	Ricky Johnston	Bob Chapman	Mark Beadle	
Cowan	Labor	**Carolyn Jakobsen**	Paul Filing	Neil Baker		
Curtin	Liberal	Philip Laskaris	**Allan Rocher**	John Gilmour	Joe Blake	
Forrest	Liberal	Gerry Thompson	Geoff Prosser	Joe Chambers	David Churches	
Fremantle	Labor	**John Dawkins**	Jenny van den Hoek	Jack Clarke		
Kalgoorlie	Labor	**Graeme Campbell**	David Johnston	Ron Smales	Frank Chulung	
Moore	Labor	**Allen Blanchard**	Jim Crawley	Geoff Gill		
O'Connor	Liberal	Kim Chance	**Wilson Tuckey**	Trevor Flugge	Shyama Peebles	
Perth	Labor	**Ric Charlesworth**	Bob Campbell	Ted Lisle		
Stirling	Labor	**Ron Edwards**	Bill Brown	Malcolm Beveridge	Harvard Barclay	Alf Bussell
Swan	Labor	**Kim Beazley**	Harry Klapp	Adelia Bernard		Georgina Motion
Tangney	Liberal	Ray Masterton	**Peter Shack**	William Witham	Richard Jeffreys	

== Senate ==
Sitting Senators are shown in bold text. Since this was a double dissolution election, each state elected twelve senators. The first six successful candidates from each state were elected to six-year terms, the remaining six to three-year terms. Tickets that elected at least one Senator are highlighted in the relevant colour. Successful candidates are identified by an asterisk (*).

=== Australian Capital Territory ===
Two seats were up for election. The Labor Party was defending one seat. The Liberal Party was defending one seat.

Labor candidates	Liberal candidates	Democrats candidates	NDP candidates	Ungrouped candidates
1. **Susan Ryan***; 2. Barry Reid	1. **Margaret Reid***; 2. Bill Stefaniak	1. Andrew Freeman; 2. Geoff Quayle	1. Michael Denborough; 2. Margaret Matthew	Leonard Munday; David Ash; John Murray

=== New South Wales ===
Twelve seats were up for election. The Labor Party was defending six seats. The Liberal-National Coalition was defending five seats. The Australian Democrats were defending one seat.

Labor candidates	Coalition candidates	Democrats candidates	NDP candidates	CTA candidates	Greens candidates
1. **Kerry Sibraa***; 2. **Arthur Gietzelt***; 3. **Graham Richardson***; 4. **Bruce Childs***; 5. **John Morris***; 6. **Sue West**; 7. Michael Sexton	1. **Michael Baume*** (Lib); 2. **Peter Baume*** (Lib); 3. **David Brownhill*** (Nat); 4. **Chris Puplick*** (Lib); 5. Bronwyn Bishop* (Lib); 6. Ralph Schulze (Nat); 7. June McPhie (Lib)	1. Paul McLean*; 2. Jenny Macleod; 3. Richard Jones; 4. Gary Chestnut	1. Robert Wood*; 2. Irina Dunn	1. Elaine Nile; 2. Kevin Hume	1. Ian Cohen; 2. Daphne Gollan
UAP candidates	Defence candidates	Group A candidates	Group B candidates	Group F candidates	Group I candidates
1. Alan Smith; 2. Edna Fabb	1. Leslie Edwards; 2. David Herd; 3. William Tuohy; 4. Rowley McMahon	1. Ruth Phillips; 2. Walter Brun	1. Patricia Poulos; 2. John Holley; 3. John Beasley	1. Leon Bringolf; 2. Habib Fares; 3. Jim Donovan	1. Peter Consandine; 2. Brian Buckley
Ungrouped candidates					
John Higginbotham; John Murphy; James Goody; Phil Murray	Nick Jones; Bob Spanswick; Ivor F	Kevin Larkings; Jane Smith-New; Arthur Chesterfield-Evans			

=== Northern Territory ===
Two seats were up for election. The Labor Party was defending one seat. The Country Liberal Party was defending one seat.

Labor candidates	CLP candidates	NT Nationals candidates	Group C candidates	Ungrouped candidates
1. Bob Collins*; 2. Lyn Reid	1. Grant Tambling*; 2. Ian Towns	1. Jim Petrich; 2. Joan Small	1. Lyn Allen; 2. Catherin Paul	Yuri Juriev

=== Queensland ===
Twelve seats were up for election. The Labor Party was defending five seats (although Senator George Georges was contesting the election as an independent). The Liberal Party was defending two seats. The National Party was defending four seats. The Australian Democrats were defending one seat.

Labor candidates	Liberal candidates	National candidates	Democrats candidates	NDP candidates	UAP candidates
1. **Margaret Reynolds***; 2. **Mal Colston***; 3. **Gerry Jones***; 4. **John Black***; 5. Bryant Burns*; 6. Jack Camp; 7. Glenevie Jensen	1. **David MacGibbon***; 2. **Warwick Parer***; 3. Gary Neat; 4. Cassie Solomon; 5. Brian Taylor; 6. Jane Williamson	1. **Florence Bjelke-Petersen***; 2. John Stone*; 3. **Ron Boswell***; 4. **Glen Sheil***; 5. George Cowan; 6. Vicky Kippin; 7. Ann Garms; 8. Bruce Laming	1. **Michael Macklin***; 2. Cheryl Kernot; 3. Norman Johnson; 4. Anthony Walters	1. John Jones; 2. Brian Dunsford	1. Ron Alford; 2. Geoff Fawthrop
Group A candidates	Group C candidates	Group E candidates	Ungrouped candidates		
1. Barry Weedon; 2. Kathleen Wacker	1. Ray Ferguson; 2. Jake Haub	1. **George Georges**	John Bolt; Ron Smith		

=== South Australia ===
Twelve seats were up for election. The Labor Party was defending five seats. The Liberal Party was defending five seats (although Senator Don Jessop contested the election as an independent). The Australian Democrats were defending two seats (although Senator David Vigor contested the election for the Unite Australia Party).

Labor candidates	Liberal candidates	National candidates	Democrats candidates	Unite Australia candidates	Green Party candidates
1. **Dominic Foreman***; 2. **Nick Bolkus***; 3. **Graham Maguire***; 4. **Rosemary Crowley***; 5. Chris Schacht*; 6. Vic Heron; 7. Rosalie McDonald	1. **Tony Messner***; 2. **Amanda Vanstone***; 3. **Robert Hill***; 4. Grant Chapman*; 5. **Baden Teague***; 6. Michele Mercurio; 7. Ivan Venning	1. Bill Wright; 2. Neville Agars; 3. Mike Rogers; 4. Jessie Taylor; 5. Bob Brown; 6. Clifford Boyd	1. **Janine Haines***; 2. John Coulter*; 3. Meg Lees; 4. Ian McLiesh; 5. Peter Vervoorn	1. **David Vigor**; 2. Nick Theologou; 3. Patricia Prowse; 4. Maxwell Elphick	1. Ally Fricker; 2. Jules Davison
Communist candidates	Group A candidates	Group C candidates	Group F candidates	Ungrouped candidates	
1. John Wishart; 2. Linda Gale	1. Creston Magasdi; 2. Reg McColl	1. **Don Jessop**	1. Tom Towle; 2. Ellen Towle	Robert Worth; Rob Robertson; Helen Launer; Syd Plenty	Stephen Bailey; John Out; Bill Forster

=== Tasmania ===
Twelve seats were up for election. The Labor Party was defending five seats. The Liberal Party was defending five seats. The Australian Democrats were defending one seat. Independent Senator Brian Harradine was defending one seat.

Labor candidates	Liberal candidates	Democrats candidates	Harradine candidates	Ungrouped candidates
1. **Michael Tate***; 2. **John Coates***; 3. **Terry Aulich***; 4. **Ray Devlin***; 5. John Devereux*; 6. Janet Cooper; 7. John Green	1. **Brian Archer***; 2. **Shirley Walters***; 3. **John Watson***; 4. **Jocelyn Newman***; 5. Paul Calvert*; 6. Vince Smith; 7. Peter Aldridge	1. **Norm Sanders***; 2. Nick Goldie; 3. Isla Macgregor	1. **Brian Harradine***; 2. Colin Sacco	Michael Mansell; Laurie Heathorn

=== Victoria ===
Twelve seats were up for election. The Labor Party was defending five seats. The Liberal Party was defending five seats. The Australian Democrats were defending two seats (although Senator John Siddons contested the election for the Unite Australia Party).

Labor candidates	Liberal candidates	National candidates	Democrats candidates	Unite Australia candidates	DLP candidates
1. **John Button***; 2. **Gareth Evans***; 3. **Olive Zakharov***; 4. **Robert Ray***; 5. **Barney Cooney***; 6. John Halfpenny; 7. Carole Taylor	1. **Austin Lewis***; 2. **Jim Short***; 3. **Richard Alston***; 4. **David Hamer***; 5. Kay Patterson*; 6. John Wyld; 7. John Goodfellow; 8. John Riggall; 9. Severn Clarke	1. Julian McGauran*; 2. Noel Maughan; 3. Les Flintoff	1. **Janet Powell***; 2. Sid Spindler; 3. Ken Peak; 4. Harold Fraser; 5. Peter Allen	1. **John Siddons**; 2. Ian Price; 3. Lisa Harris	1. John Mulholland; 2. Gloria Brook
NDP candidates	CTA candidates	Pensioner candidates	Group B candidates	Group F candidates	Group J candidates
1. Aldo Penbrook; 2. Nik Dow	1. Al Watson; 2. Loretto Brennan; 3. John Easton	1. Neil McKay; 2. Rosamond Ewan	1. Bill Hartley; 2. Laurene Dietrich; 3. David Kerin; 4. Rola Haidar	1. David Caccianiga; 2. Bill Thiele	1. Lisa King; 2. Kevin O'Connell
Group K candidates	Group L candidates	Group O candidates	Ungrouped candidates		
1. Alan Miller; 2. Maria Bennett	1. Laurie Dunlop; 2. Simon Hood	1. Dino de Marchi; 2. Ineke Black	Kym Roylance; Abraham Abdalla		

=== Western Australia ===
Twelve seats were up for election. The Labor Party was defending six seats. The Liberal Party was defending five seats. Independent Senator Jo Vallentine, elected for the Nuclear Disarmament Party but now running under the "Vallentine Peace Group" banner, was defending one seat.

Labor candidates	Liberal candidates	National candidates	Democrats candidates	VPG candidates	UAP candidates
1. **Peter Walsh***; 2. **Patricia Giles***; 3. **Peter Cook***; 4. **Jim McKiernan***; 5. Michael Beahan*; 6. Chris Evans; 7. Ed Dermer	1. **Fred Chaney***; 2. **Peter Durack***; 3. **Sue Knowles***; 4. **Noel Crichton-Browne***; 5. John Panizza*; 6. Alan Eggleston; 7. Cam Tinley	1. James MacDonald; 2. Glenice Sanders; 3. Ron Aitkenhead; 4. Beverley Poor	1. Jean Jenkins*; 2. Jack Evans	1. **Jo Vallentine***; 2. Louise Duxbury	1. Allan McMullen; 2. Norm Heslington
OAM candidates	Ungrouped candidates				
1. Cedric Jacobs; 2. Don Jackson; 3. Ed Robertson	Frank Nesci; Jack Flanigan	Mark Pallister; Gordon McColl			

== Summary by party ==
Beside each party is the number of seats contested by that party in the House of Representatives for each state, as well as an indication of whether the party contested the Senate election in the respective state.

Party	NSW		Vic		Qld		WA		SA		Tas		ACT		NT		Total	
Party	HR	S	HR	S	HR	S	HR	S	HR	S	HR	S	HR	S	HR	S	HR	S
Australian Labor Party	51	*	39	*	24	*	13	*	13	*	5	*	2	*	1	*	148	8
Liberal Party of Australia	41	*	39	*	24	*	13	*	13	*	5	*	2	*			132	7
National Party of Australia	14	*	17	*	24	*	13	*	13	*							81	5
Country Liberal Party															1	*	1	1
Australian Democrats	42	*	37	*	20	*	8	*	13	*	4	*	2	*			126	7
Unite Australia Party	2	*	6	*		*		*	13	*							21	5
Nuclear Disarmament Party	1	*		*	1	*							2	*			4	4
Pensioner Party of Australia			4	*													4	1
Democratic Labor Party			2	*													2	1
Australian Family Movement													2				2	
Communist Party of Australia									1	*							1	1
Northern Territory Nationals															1	*	1	1
Socialist Workers Party			1														1	
Call to Australia		*		*														2
Green Alliance		*								*								2
Defence and Ex-Services Party		*																1
Vallentine Peace Group								*										1
One Australia Movement								*										1
Independent and other	38		28		4		2		7				4				83	

== Unregistered parties and groups ==
- The Socialist Party of Australia endorsed Nick Papanikitas in Grayndler, Sofia Mavrogeorgis in Hindmarsh, Brian Rooney in Port Adelaide, and Senate tickets in New South Wales (Group F), Victoria (Group K) and Queensland (Group C).
- The Industrial Labor Party endorsed Martin Greany in Ballarat, Darren Chapman in Batman, Gil Speirs in Deakin, Les Johnson in Dunkley, Linda Ely in Isaacs, Bob Wilson in McEwen, and Group B for the Senate in Victoria.

== See also ==
- 1987 Australian federal election
- Members of the Australian House of Representatives, 1984–1987
- Members of the Australian House of Representatives, 1987–1990
- Members of the Australian Senate, 1985–1987
- Members of the Australian Senate, 1987–1990
- List of political parties in Australia
