= Candidates of the 1984 Australian federal election =

This article provides information on candidates who stood for the 1984 Australian federal election. The election was held on 1 December 1984.

== Redistributions and seat changes ==
- Due to the expansion of the House, redistributions occurred in all states.
  - In New South Wales, the National-held seat of Paterson was abolished and the National-held seat of Riverina was renamed Riverina-Darling and became notionally Labor. Nine new seats were created: the notionally Labor seats of Charlton, Dobell, Fowler, Gilmore, Greenway, Lindsay and Throsby; and the notionally National seats of Page and Parkes.
    - The member for Chifley, Russ Gorman (Labor), contested Greenway.
    - The member for Cowper, Ian Robinson (National), contested Page.
    - The member for Farrer, Wal Fife (Liberal), contested Hume.
    - The member for Hunter, Bob Brown (Labor), contested Charlton.
    - The member for Macarthur, Colin Hollis (Labor), contested Throsby.
    - The member for Macquarie, Ross Free (Labor), contested Lindsay.
    - The member for Riverina, Noel Hicks (National), contested Riverina-Darling.
  - In Queensland, the National-held seat of Darling Downs was renamed Groom. Five new seats were created: the notionally Labor seats of Forde, Hinkler and Rankin; the notionally Liberal seat of Moncrieff; and the notionally National seat of Fairfax. The Labor-held seat of Fadden became notionally Liberal.
    - The member for Darling Downs, Tom McVeigh (National), contested Groom.
    - The member for Fadden, David Beddall (Labor), contested Rankin.
    - The member for Fisher, Evan Adermann (National), contested Fairfax.
    - Queensland Senator Kathy Martin (Liberal) contested Moncrieff.
  - In South Australia, the notionally Labor seat of Makin and the notionally Liberal seat of Mayo were created.
  - In Tasmania, the Liberal-held seat of Wilmot was renamed Lyons. The sitting member, Max Burr, contested Lyons.
  - In Victoria, the Liberal-held seat of Balaclava was renamed Goldstein and the Labor-held Diamond Valley was abolished. Seven new seats were created: the notionally Labor seats of Aston, Calwell, Dunkley, Jagajaga, McEwen and Streeton; and the notionally Liberal seat of Menzies. The Labor-held seats of Casey and Deakin became notionally Liberal.
    - The member for Balaclava, Ian Macphee (Liberal), contested Goldstein.
    - The member for Burke, Andrew Theophanous (Labor), contested Calwell.
    - The member for Deakin, John Saunderson (Labor), contested Aston.
    - The member for Diamond Valley, Peter Staples (Labor), contested Jagajaga.
    - The member for Flinders, Bob Chynoweth (Labor), contested Dunkley.
  - In Western Australia, the notionally Labor seats of Brand and Cowan were created. The Labor-held seat of Tangney became notionally Liberal.
    - The member for Canning, Wendy Fatin (Labor), contested Brand.
    - The member for Tangney, George Gear (Labor), contested Canning.

== Retiring Members and Senators ==
=== Labor ===
- Doug Everingham MP (Capricornia, Qld)
- Ken Fry MP (Fraser, ACT)
- Bill Morrison MP (St George, NSW)
- Senator Jean Hearn (Tas)
- Senator Cyril Primmer (Vic)

=== Liberal ===
- Ray Groom MP (Braddon, Tas)
- Kevin Newman MP (Bass, Tas)
- Senator Misha Lajovic (NSW)

=== National ===
- Frank O'Keefe MP (Paterson, NSW)
- Senator Douglas Scott (NSW)

== House of Representatives ==
Sitting members at the time of the election are shown in bold text. Successful candidates are highlighted in the relevant colour. Where there is possible confusion, an asterisk (*) is also used.

=== Australian Capital Territory ===
Electorate	Held by	Labor candidate	Liberal candidate	Democrats candidate	Other candidates
Canberra	Labor	**Ros Kelly**	Gary Humphries	Fiona Richardson	Robyn Hancock (NDP); Joanne Hansen (DSPA)
Fraser	Labor	John Langmore	John McLaren	Andrew Freeman	Emile Brunoro (Ind); Arthur Burns (Ind); Rozalyn Daniell (DSPA); Kevin Wise (Ind)

=== New South Wales ===
Electorate	Held by	Labor candidate	Coalition candidate	Democrats candidate	Other candidates
Banks	Labor	**John Mountford**	Max Parker (Lib)	Montague Green	
Barton	Labor	**Gary Punch**	Jim Bradfield (Lib)	Ron George	
Bennelong	Liberal	Margaret Duckett	**John Howard** (Lib)	Steve Gabell	
Berowra	Liberal	Rodney Berry	**Harry Edwards** (Lib)	Chris Rogers	
Blaxland	Labor	**Paul Keating**	Bob Young (Lib)	Samuel Adams	
Bradfield	Liberal	Matthew Strassberg	**David Connolly** (Lib)	Emma Veitch	
Calare	Labor	**David Simmons**	Ian Byrne (Lib); Russ Turner (Nat)	Gregory Hamilton	Margaret Stevenson (Ind)
Charlton	Labor	**Bob Brown**	Don Harris (Lib)	Lyn Godfrey	
Chifley	Labor	Roger Price	Ken Jessup (Lib)	Dominic Fanning	
Cook	Liberal	Peter McIlwaine	**Don Dobie** (Lib)	Brett Gooley	
Cowper	National	Joe Moran	Garry Nehl* (Nat); Peter Simpson (Lib)	Alfred Tozer	Keith Jervis (Ind); David Rees (Ind)
Cunningham	Labor	**Stewart West**	Gayle Mitchell (Lib)	Greg Butler	Neil Cleary (Ind); Rudolph Dezelin (Ind); John Garcia (SWP)
Dobell	Labor	Michael Lee	Isaac Shields (Lib)	Lynn Sawyer	
Dundas	Liberal	Margaret Blaxell	**Philip Ruddock** (Lib)	John Tuminello	
Eden-Monaro	Labor	**Jim Snow**	Alexander Black (Nat); Murray Sainsbury (Lib)		Bob Shumack (NDP)
Farrer	Liberal	Eric Thomas	Tim Fischer* (Nat); John Roach (Lib)		
Fowler	Labor	Ted Grace	Ken Wills (Lib)		David Bransdon (Ind)
Gilmore	Labor	Bob Stephens	Noel Anderson (Lib); John Sharp* (Nat)	John Sanders	Rodney Lander (NDP); Ronald Sarina (Ind)
Grayndler	Labor	**Leo McLeay**	John Marsden-Lynch (Lib)	Peter Hennessy	Christine Broi (SWP)
Greenway	Labor	**Russ Gorman**	Edna Mitchell (Lib)		Michael Corbin (Ind); Ray Eade (Ind)
Gwydir	National	Pamela Smith	**Ralph Hunt** (Nat)	Lyall Munro Jnr	John Brazier (Ind)
Hughes	Labor	**Robert Tickner**	Cliff Mason (Lib)	Harold Jeffrey	Marjorie Wisby (Ind)
Hume	National	Rodney Milliken	**Wal Fife*** (Lib); **Stephen Lusher** (Nat)		
Hunter	Labor	Eric Fitzgibbon	Ron Dolton (Lib); John Turner (Nat)	Warren Reid	
Kingsford-Smith	Labor	**Lionel Bowen**	Collin O'Neill (Lib)	Peter Longfield	Helen Boyle (Ind)
Lindsay	Labor	**Ross Free**	Stuart Coppock (Lib)	Kevin Crameri	
Lowe	Labor	**Michael Maher**	Geoffrey Howe (Lib)	Kent Buncombe	
Lyne	National	Fred May	**Bruce Cowan** (Nat)	Roland Inman	Stewart Cooper (Ind)
Macarthur	Labor	Stephen Martin	Mark Stanham (Lib)	Meg Sampson	
Mackellar	Liberal	Tim Cusack	**Jim Carlton** (Lib)	Graeme Maclennan	Maurice Foley (Ind)
Macquarie	Labor	Garry Cronan	Paul McGirr (Nat); Alasdair Webster* (Lib)	Dick Jackson-Hope	Peter Quirk (Ind)
Mitchell	Liberal	Edward Mason	**Alan Cadman** (Lib)	Alan Page	
Newcastle	Labor	**Allan Morris**	Ashley Saunders (Lib)	Steve Jeffries	Jim Campbell (Ind); Don Geddes (Ind)
New England	National	Joe Horan	**Ian Sinclair** (Nat)	Rod Irvine	
North Sydney	Liberal	Philip Kelso	**John Spender** (Lib)	Rod Dominish	
Page	National	Brian Morris	**Ian Robinson** (Nat)	Anne Brown	Brian Stone (Ind)
Parkes	National	Jim Curran	Michael Cobb* (Nat); Bruce Rowley (Lib)	Gloria Collison	
Parramatta	Labor	**John Brown**	Charles Stanley (Lib)	John Butterworth	
Phillip	Labor	**Jeannette McHugh**	Peter Bardos (Lib)	Karin Sowada	Fred Brinkman (Ind); Donald Rugless (Ind)
Prospect	Labor	**Dick Klugman**	Adrian Burke (Lib)	Robert Neesam	Dick Nichols (SWP)
Reid	Labor	**Tom Uren**	Mary-Ruth Kain (Lib)	John Roveen	Jim Saleam (Ind)
Richmond	National	Klaas Woldring	**Charles Blunt** (Nat)	Ivor Brown	Jon Axens (Ind); Jim Saunders (Ind)
Riverina-Darling	Labor	Ron Adams	**Noel Hicks*** (Nat); John Sullivan (Lib)	Peter Hains	Frederick Martin (Ind)
Robertson	Labor	**Barry Cohen**	Peter Jansen (Lib)	Trevor Willsher	
Shortland	Labor	**Peter Morris**	Milton Caine (Lib)	John Aitken	Jane Power (Ind)
St George	Labor	Stephen Dubois	Bob Gemmell (Lib)	Paul Terrett	Brian Compton (Ind); Stanley Duncan (Ind)
Sydney	Labor	**Peter Baldwin**	James Harker-Mortlock (Lib)	Michael Walsh	Aileen Beaver (CPA); Daphne Gollan (Ind); Noel Hazard (Ind); Vito Radice (Ind)
Throsby	Labor	**Colin Hollis**	Duncan Gair (Nat); Wendy Stubbs (Lib)	Alan Cole	Martin Essenberg (Ind); Paul Trevardis (Ind)
Warringah	Liberal	Brian Green	**Michael MacKellar** (Lib)	Richard Jones	Margaret Broome (Ind)
Wentworth	Liberal	Stephen Rothman	**Peter Coleman** (Lib)	Yvonne Jayawardena	George Atkinson (Ind); Kasula Fitzroy-Mendis (Ind); Ray Oakes (Ind); George Warnecke (Ind)
Werriwa	Labor	**John Kerin**	Peter Swiderski (Lib)	Valerie George	

=== Northern Territory ===
Electorate	Held by	Labor candidate	CLP candidate	Democrats candidate	Independent candidates
Northern Territory	Labor	**John Reeves**	Paul Everingham	Wiyendji Roberts	Strider; Phil Ward

=== Queensland ===
Electorate	Held by	Labor candidate	Liberal candidate	National candidate	Democrats candidate	Other candidates
Bowman	Labor	**Len Keogh**	Leo White	Noel Willersdorf	Ronald Heindorff	
Brisbane	Labor	**Manfred Cross**	Ian Douglas	William Owen	George Leigh	
Capricornia	Labor	Keith Wright	Alan Agnew	Colin Webber	Peter Knack	Eric Geissmann (Ind)
Dawson	National	John Bird		**Ray Braithwaite**	Antony Lucas	
Fadden	Liberal	Peter Wilson	David Jull	Alun Preece	Janice Barber	
Fairfax	National	Peter Shooter	Terry Welch	**Evan Adermann**	Bob Borsellino	
Fisher	National	Garth Head	Lionel Kilner	Peter Slipper	Kent Farrell	
Forde	Labor	Hamish Linacre	David Watson	Francis Gaffy	Michael Coogan	
Griffith	Labor	**Ben Humphreys**	Kaylene Low	Sean Cousins	Daniel Roth	Helen Jones (SWP)
Groom	National	Ronald Cullin	Alexander Munro	**Tom McVeigh**	Raymond Dow	
Herbert	Labor	**Ted Lindsay**	Theo Theofanes	Vicky Kippin	Ana Bristowe-Lamb	
Hinkler	Labor	Brian Courtice	Ronald Owen	Bryan Conquest	Frank Coulthard	Marcus Platen (Ind)
Kennedy	National	Brigid Walsh	Gerald Porter	**Bob Katter**	Lance Winter	
Leichhardt	Labor	**John Gayler**	Hugh Anthony	Eda Celledoni	Cliff Truelove	Daas Saba (Ind)
Lilley	Labor	**Elaine Darling**	Ian Parminter	John Frew		Anthony Catip (Ind)
Maranoa	National	Dave Summers		**Ian Cameron**	Mick Brannigan	
McPherson	Liberal	Rupe Granrott	**Peter White**	Warren Tapp	Ken Peterson	Maria Parer (Ind)
Moncrieff	Liberal	Athol Paterson	Kathy Martin	Judy Gamin	Susan Mulley	Will Aabraham-Steer (Ind); Peter Courtney (Ind)
Moreton	Liberal	Michael Kinnane	**Don Cameron**	Howard Baskerville	Geoffrey Fawthrop	
Oxley	Labor	**Bill Hayden**	Les Woodforth	Charles Groves	George Hannaford	
Petrie	Labor	**Deane Wells**	John Hodges	Don Munro	Garry Somerville	
Rankin	Labor	**David Beddall**	Bruce Mackenzie-Forbes	Cec Jamieson	Bev Peereboom	
Ryan	Liberal	Mike Foley	**John Moore**	Maxwell Crofts	John Peeters	
Wide Bay	National	Fred Hoberg		**Clarrie Millar**	Glen Spicer	

=== South Australia ===
Electorate	Held by	Labor candidate	Liberal candidate	Democrats candidate	National candidate	Other candidates
Adelaide	Labor	**Chris Hurford**	Jenni London	Andrew Sickerdick	Bryan Stokes	John Buik (Ind); Mark Thiel (Ind)
Barker	Liberal	Jeremy Moore	**James Porter**	Meg Lees	Richard Jacka	
Bonython	Labor	**Neal Blewett**	Graham Sara	John Longhurst		
Boothby	Liberal	Bruce Whyatt	**Steele Hall**	Margaret-Ann Williams	Douglas Lindley	
Grey	Labor	**Lloyd O'Neil**	Russell Reid	Harm Folkers	Robin Dixon-Thompson	
Hawker	Labor	**Ralph Jacobi**	Charles Campbell	Graham Pamount	Thomas Correll	
Hindmarsh	Labor	**John Scott**	Barry Lewis	Ian Haines		Paul Petit (SWP)
Kingston	Labor	**Gordon Bilney**	Richard Noble	Robert Ralph	Neville Agars	Paul Breakwell (NDP)
Makin	Labor	Peter Duncan	Neville Joyce	Andrew Coventry	John Henderson	Bernhard Buechner (Ind)
Mayo	Liberal	John Quirke	Alexander Downer	Donald Chisholm	Bob Shearer	
Port Adelaide	Labor	**Mick Young**	Thomas Ireland	Robert Manhire		Deborah Gordon (SWP)
Sturt	Liberal	Jim Gale	**Ian Wilson**	Alison Dolling		
Wakefield	Liberal	Suzanne Owens	**Neil Andrew**	Anne Hausler	Terry Halford	

=== Tasmania ===
Electorate	Held by	Labor candidate	Liberal candidate	Democrats candidate	Independent candidate
Bass	Liberal	Vicki Buchanan	Warwick Smith	Michael Preece	
Braddon	Liberal	Greg Peart	Chris Miles	Gavin Bugg	
Denison	Liberal	Kay Spurr	**Michael Hodgman**		Mary Willey
Franklin	Liberal	John Devereux	**Bruce Goodluck**	John Thomson	
Lyons	Liberal	David Llewellyn	**Max Burr**	Liz Holloway	

=== Victoria ===
Electorate	Held by	Labor candidate	Coalition candidate	Democrats candidate	DLP candidate	Other candidates
Aston	Labor	**John Saunderson**	Rob Llewellyn (Lib)	Harry Eichler	Robert Garratt	
Ballarat	Labor	**John Mildren**	John Ronan (Lib); Douglas Stewart (Nat)	Graham Gough	John Ferwerda	
Batman	Labor	**Brian Howe**	Mary Hoysted (Lib)	James Cockell	Philip L'Huillier	
Bendigo	Labor	**John Brumby**	Reginald Holt (Nat); Daryl McClure (Lib)	Nola Rixon	Vincent Jordan	
Bruce	Liberal	Joan Graystone	**Ken Aldred** (Lib)	Michael Johnson	Mary Mulholland	
Burke	Labor	Neil O'Keefe	Marisa d'Agostino (Lib); Leslie Vidler (Nat)	George Hunter	Genevieve Cormick	
Calwell	Labor	**Andrew Theophanous**	Graham Anderson (Lib)	Lesley Ellen	Martin Mulholland	
Casey	Liberal	**Peter Steedman**	Robert Gray (Nat); Bob Halverson* (Lib)	Michael Nardella	John Garratt	Rosamund Ewan (PPA)
Chisholm	Labor	**Helen Mayer**	Graham Harris (Lib); Ray Murphy (Nat)	Colin Rochford	Kevin Carroll	
Corangamite	Liberal	Gavan O'Connor	**Stewart McArthur*** (Lib); Bruce Webster (Nat)	Robert Mann	James Jordan	Roy Charles (PPA)
Corio	Labor	**Gordon Scholes**	James King (Nat); Roger Phipps (Lib)	Greta Pearce	Louise Sharah	Ian Green (Ind)
Deakin	Liberal	Richard Johns	Julian Beale (Lib)	Jeffrey McAlpine	Peter Ferwerda	
Dunkley	Labor	**Bob Chynoweth**	Leonie Clark (Lib); Judy Hale (Nat)	Grenville Charles	John Cass	
Flinders	Labor	Russell Joiner	Peter Reith* (Lib); Paul van Staveren (Nat)	Murray Gill	John McNamara	John Miln (PPA)
Gellibrand	Labor	**Ralph Willis**	Christopher Gowing (Lib)	Shirley Bold	Margaret Reed	James Doughney (SWP)
Gippsland	National	Bill de Vink	Rod Conley (Lib); **Peter McGauran*** (Nat)	Wilma Western	Margaret Handley	Ben Buckley (Ind); Peter Gardner (NDP)
Goldstein	Liberal	Garry Moore	Pat Brown (Nat); **Ian Macphee*** (Lib)	Maureen Boaler	Patrick Keelan	
Henty	Labor	**Joan Child**	Rudi Michelson (Lib); Peter Ryan (Nat)	Margaret Moore	Martin Callanan	
Higgins	Liberal	Kenneth Penaluna	Babette Francis (Nat); **Roger Shipton*** (Lib)	Laurence Levy	Robert Semmel	
Holt	Labor	**Michael Duffy**	John Ferwerda (Lib)	Louise Stewart	Brian McDonald	
Hotham	Labor	**Lewis Kent**	Michael Heffernan (Lib)	Greg Chipp	Edwards Woods	
Indi	Liberal	Joe Murphy	Bill Baxter (Nat); **Ewen Cameron*** (Lib)	Geoffrey le Couteur	Paul Carroll	
Isaacs	Labor	**David Charles**	Charles Lacey (Nat); Peter Zablud (Lib)	Peter Lindemann	Dudley de Rozario	
Jagajaga	Labor	**Peter Staples**	Frederick Garratt (Lib)	Peter Lovell	Len Moore	Nino de Tress (Ind)
Kooyong	Liberal	Kate Nash	**Andrew Peacock** (Lib)	Russell White	John Mulholland	David Greagg (Ind)
Lalor	Labor	**Barry Jones**	Mark Pallett (Lib)	Barry McLeod	Gail de Rozario	
La Trobe	Labor	**Peter Milton**	Ted French (Lib)	Andrew McCann	Julie Garratt	
Mallee	National	Lindsay Leake	**Peter Fisher*** (Nat); M. Treseder (Lib)	Colin Cavanagh	Robert Hogarth	Albertus Stoutjesdijk (Ind)
Maribyrnong	Labor	**Alan Griffiths**	Sally Gooch (Lib)	Kathie Gizycki	Rosemary Maurus	Helen Said (SWP); Richard Wright (Ind)
McEwen	Labor	Peter Cleeland	John Brewster (Nat); Brian Dixon (Lib)	Julie Stayner	Daniel Mason	
McMillan	Labor	**Barry Cunningham**	John Dwyer (Lib); Heather Ronald (Nat)	James Richards	Anne Barrett	
Melbourne	Labor	**Gerry Hand**	Ian Davis (Lib)	Chris Carter	Michael Hammet	James Ferrari (Ind)
Melbourne Ports	Labor	**Clyde Holding**	Allan Paull (Lib); Dorothy Turner (Nat)	Sue McDougall	Michael Rowe	Russell Morse (Ind); Denice Stephens (Ind)
Menzies	Liberal	David McKenzie	Neil Brown (Lib)	Lynden Kenyon	Vin Considine	
Murray	National	Mark Anderson	Anne Adams (Lib); **Bruce Lloyd*** (Nat)	John Weir	Desmond Semmel	
Scullin	Labor	**Harry Jenkins**	Pamela Philpot (Lib)	Jane Green	Helen Walsh	
Streeton	Labor	Tony Lamb	Russell Broadbent (Lib); John Clifford (Nat)	Tessa Cunningham	David Grulke	
Wannon	Liberal	Nancy Genardini	Betty Gee (Nat); **David Hawker*** (Lib)	Kathleen May	Bill Verhoef	
Wills	Labor	**Bob Hawke**	Victor Perton (Lib)	Peter Allan	Gloria Brook	Mark Ferguson (Ind); Lance Hutchinson (Ind); Glen Mann (Ind); Martin Mantell (Ind)

=== Western Australia ===
Electorate	Held by	Labor candidate	Liberal candidate	Democrats candidate	Other candidates
Brand	Labor	**Wendy Fatin**	Christopher Boyle		Thomas Renfrey (Ind)
Canning	Labor	**George Gear**	Ricky Johnston	Elizabeth Capill	
Cowan	Labor	Carolyn Jakobsen	Jeff Roberts	Alan Needham	
Curtin	Liberal	Beth Schultz	**Allan Rocher**	Marjorie McKercher	
Forrest	Liberal	Peter Holland	**Peter Drummond**	Anne Fussell	Alfred Bessell (Ind)
Fremantle	Labor	**John Dawkins**	Max Adams	Shirley de la Hunty	Timothy Peach (Ind)
Kalgoorlie	Labor	**Graeme Campbell**	Douglas Krepp	William Mason	David Nourish (NDP)
Moore	Labor	**Allen Blanchard**	Rita Waters		
O'Connor	Liberal	Kim Chance	**Wilson Tuckey**	Denis Kidby	James Ferguson (Nat)
Perth	Labor	**Ric Charlesworth**	Joan Walters		Catherine Brown (SWP)
Stirling	Labor	**Ron Edwards**	Greg Hancock	Terence Barrett	Eric Martin (Ind)
Swan	Labor	**Kim Beazley**	Frank Hayes	Linda Mottram	
Tangney	Liberal	David Dale	Peter Shack	Ron Murray	

== Senate ==
Sitting Senators are shown in bold text. The Senate was expanded at this election so that each state was represented by twelve senators instead of ten. As such, each state elected seven senators, six to serve a six-year term and one to serve a three-year term. Tickets that elected at least one Senator are highlighted in the relevant colour. Successful candidates are identified by an asterisk (*).

=== Australian Capital Territory ===
Two seats were up for election. The Labor Party was defending one seat. The Liberal Party was defending one seat.

Labor candidates	Liberal candidates	Democrats candidates	NDP candidates	Referendum First candidates
1. **Susan Ryan***; 2. Hugh Saddler	1. **Margaret Reid***; 2. David Walters	1. John Hatton; 2. Julia Knyvett	1. John Conway; 2. Jan Barratt	1. Allan Nelson; 2. Tony Spagnolo

=== New South Wales ===
Seven seats were up for election. The Labor Party was defending two seats. The Liberal-National Coalition was defending two seats. The Australian Democrats were defending one seat. Two seats were newly created. Senators Peter Baume (Liberal), Sir John Carrick (Liberal), Arthur Gietzelt (Labor), Doug McClelland (Labor) and Graham Richardson (Labor) were not up for re-election.

Labor candidates	Coalition candidates	Democrats candidates	NDP candidates	CTA candidates	Group D candidates
1. **Kerry Sibraa***; 2. **Bruce Childs***; 3. John Morris*; 4. Sue West	1. Chris Puplick* (Lib); 2. David Brownhill* (Nat); 3. Michael Baume* (Lib); 4. Bronwyn Bishop (Lib); 5. Doug Moppett (Nat)	1. **Colin Mason***; 2. Paul McLean; 3. Jenny MacLeod; 4. Garry Chestnut	1. Peter Garrett; 2. Gillian Fisher; 3. Marie-Anne Hockings; 4. Russel Ward	1. Graham McLennan; 2. Tom Toogood; 3. Patricia Judge; 4. Kevin Hume; 5. John Everingham; 6. Clair Isbister; 7. Elaine Nile	1. Henry Soper; 2. Maureen Nathan; 3. Peter Wright; 4. Archibald Brown; 5. William More; 6. John Veenstra
Group F candidates	Group G candidates	Group H candidates	Ungrouped candidates		
1. Bill Wentworth; 2. Robert Clark; 3. Raymond King; 4. Myfanwy Young	1. Peter Consandine; 2. Brian Buckley	1. Burnum Burnum; 2. Rocky Thomas	Helen Hibbard; Helen Richards		

=== Northern Territory ===
Two seats were up for election. The Labor Party was defending one seat. The Country Liberal Party was defending one seat.

Labor candidates	CLP candidates	Democrats candidates	Ungrouped candidates
1. **Ted Robertson***; 2. Warren Snowdon	1. **Bernie Kilgariff***; 2. Patricia Davies	1. Betty Pearce; 2. Fay Lawrence	Vincent Forrester

=== Queensland ===
Seven seats were up for election. The Labor Party was defending two seats. The Liberal Party was defending one seat. The National Party was defending one seat. The Australian Democrats were defending one seat. Two seats were newly created. Senators Florence Bjelke-Petersen (National), Stan Collard (National), Mal Colston (Labor), George Georges (Labor) and Warwick Parer (Liberal) were not up for re-election.

Labor candidates	Liberal candidates	National candidates	Democrats candidates	NDP candidates	Conservative candidates
1. **Margaret Reynolds***; 2. **Gerry Jones***; 3. John Black*; 4. Bryant Burns	1. **David MacGibbon***; 2. William Everingham; 3. Olive-Orme Scott-Young; 4. Christopher Gilbert; 5. Maurice Thomson	1. **Ron Boswell***; 2. Glen Sheil*; 3. Patrick Behan; 4. Alan Metcalfe	1. **Michael Macklin***; 2. Ray Hollis; 3. John Elfick; 4. Cheryl Kernot	1. Patsy Goodwin; 2. Bernard Hockings	1. Fast Bucks; 2. Peter Livesey
Group B candidates	Ungrouped candidates				
1. Hugh Bruce; 2. Michael Carr	Frank Bologna; Dieter Soegemeier; Cyril McKenzie	Norman Eather; Raymond Medwin			

=== South Australia ===
Seven seats were up for election. The Labor Party was defending three seats. The Liberal Party was defending two seats. Two seats were newly created. Senators Ron Elstob (Labor), Dominic Foreman (Labor), Janine Haines (Democrats), Robert Hill (Liberal) and Tony Messner (Liberal) were not up for re-election.

Labor candidates	Liberal candidates	Democrats candidates	National candidates	NDP candidates	CTA candidates
1. **Nick Bolkus***; 2. **Graham Maguire***; 3. **Rosemary Crowley***; 4. Vic Heron	1. **Baden Teague***; 2. **Don Jessop***; 3. Amanda Vanstone*; 4. Robert Giles	1. David Vigor*; 2. John Coulter; 3. Mike Elliott; 4. Sandra Kanck	1. John Bannon; 2. Judith Jackson; 3. Ray Rothe; 4. Helen Scott; 5. Audrey Pobke	1. Frances Mowling; 2. Ian Modistach; 3. Douglas Peers	1. Bob Brown; 2. Dean Davis; 3. William Pomery
Pensioner candidates	AFM candidates	Group D candidates	Group F candidates	Ungrouped candidates	
1. Wilfred Scott; 2. Kenneth Perry	1. Bob Boyd; 2. Fred Tanner	1. Joe Rossi; 2. Warwick Stallard; 3. Giovanni Melino; 4. Gizella Farkas	1. Judy Gillett; 2. Brian Sones; 3. Eugene Sibelle	Peter Gagliardi; Herman Bersee; Edward Dyer	

=== Tasmania ===
Seven seats were up for election. The Labor Party was defending two seats. The Liberal Party was defending three seats. Two seats were newly created. Senators Don Grimes (Labor), Brian Harradine (Independent), Peter Rae (Liberal), Michael Tate (Labor) and Shirley Walters (Liberal) were not up for re-election.

Labor candidates	Liberal candidates	Democrats candidates	NDP candidates	Harradine candidates
1. Terry Aulich*; 2. Ray Devlin*; 3. **John Coates***; 4. John White	1. **Brian Archer***; 2. **John Watson***; 3. **Michael Townley***; 4. Eric Abetz; 5. Des Cooper; 6. Michael Chabrel	1. Norm Sanders*; 2. Lyn Newitt	1. Ian Paulin; 2. Anne Parker	1. Kath Venn; 2. Colin Sacco

=== Victoria ===
Seven seats were up for election. The Labor Party was defending three seats. The Liberal Party was defending two seats. Two seats were newly created. Senators John Button (Labor), Don Chipp (Democrats), Gareth Evans (Labor), Dame Margaret Guilfoyle (Liberal) and Austin Lewis (Liberal) were not up for re-election.

Labor candidates	Liberal candidates	Democrats candidates	NDP candidates	National candidates	DLP candidates
1. **Olive Zakharov***; 2. **Robert Ray***; 3. Barney Cooney*; 4. Carole Marple	1. **Alan Missen***; 2. **David Hamer***; 3. Jim Short*; 4. Richard Alston; 5. Zirka Yaskewych	1. John Siddons*; 2. Janet Powell; 3. Ian Price; 4. Sid Spindler; 5. Kenneth Peak	1. Jean Melzer; 2. Venturino Venturini	1. Shirley McKerrow; 2. John Cromarty; 3. Louise Jenkins; 4. John Keating; 5. Murray Buzza	1. Brian Handley; 2. Maria Handley; 3. William Mahony; 4. Lois Mahony
CTA candidates	Pensioner candidates	Ungrouped candidates			
1. Barry Tattersall; 2. Valerie Renkema; 3. Edna Hall; 4. John Easton	1. Neil McKay; 2. Margaret Carter	Maurice Smith; Tiger Casley; Michael Krape; Augustus Titter; Bill Kapphan			

=== Western Australia ===
Seven seats were up for election. The Labor Party was defending two seats. The Liberal Party was defending two seats. The Australian Democrats were defending one seat. Two seats were newly created. Senators Fred Chaney (Liberal), Ruth Coleman (Labor), Peter Durack (Liberal), Gordon McIntosh (Labor) and Peter Walsh (Labor) were not up for re-election.

Labor candidates	Liberal candidates	Democrats candidates	NDP candidates	National candidates	AFM candidates
1. **Patricia Giles***; 2. **Peter Cook***; 3. Jim McKiernan*; 4. John Crouch	1. **Noel Crichton-Browne***; 2. **Reg Withers***; 3. Sue Knowles*; 4. Murray Nixon	1. **Jack Evans**; 2. Richard Jeffreys; 3. Jean Jenkins	1. Jo Vallentine*; 2. Lindsay Matthews	1. Bruce Currie; 2. Eric Blight; 3. Mort Schell; 4. Graham Barrett-Lennard	1. Brian Peachey; 2. Beryl Van Luyn; 3. Nellie Clark; 4. John Gilmour; 5. Kenneth Wright; 6. Ronald Bott
Group E candidates	Ungrouped candidates				
1. Frank Nesci; 2. Nellie Stuart	Jack van Tongeren; Martin Suter; Frank Ash				

== Summary by party ==
Beside each party is the number of seats contested by that party in the House of Representatives for each state, as well as an indication of whether the party contested the Senate election in the respective state.

Party	NSW		Vic		Qld		WA		SA		Tas		ACT		NT		Total	
Party	HR	S	HR	S	HR	S	HR	S	HR	S	HR	S	HR	S	HR	S	HR	S
Australian Labor Party	51	*	39	*	24	*	13	*	13	*	5	*	2	*	1	*	148	8
Liberal Party of Australia	46	*	39	*	21	*	13	*	13	*	5	*	2	*			139	7
National Party of Australia	16	*	22	*	24	*	1	*	9	*							72	5
Country Liberal Party															1	*	1	1
Australian Democrats	46	*	39	*	23	*	10	*	13	*	4	*	2	*	1	*	138	8
Democratic Labor Party			39	*													39	1
Socialist Workers Party	3		2		1		1		2								9	
Nuclear Disarmament Party	2	*	1	*		*	1	*	1	*		*	1	*			6	7
Pensioner Party of Australia			3	*						*							3	2
Deadly Serious Party													2				2	
Communist Party of Australia	1																1	
Call to Australia		*		*						*								3
Australian Family Movement								*		*								2
Conservative Party of Australia						*												1
Referendum First Group														*				1
Independent and other	37		13		7		4		3		1		3		2		70	

== See also ==
- 1984 Australian federal election
- Members of the Australian House of Representatives, 1983–1984
- Members of the Australian House of Representatives, 1984–1987
- Members of the Australian Senate, 1983–1985
- Members of the Australian Senate, 1985–1987
- List of political parties in Australia
