= Chulung =

Chulung may refer to:

- Chulung glacier, west of map Point NJ9842 on India-Pakistan Actual Ground Position Line (AGPL)
- Chulung language, a Kiranti language spoken in Nepal
- Chulung, a village in Down Meramor, Shahristan District, Daykundi Province, Afghanistan
- Chulung, a village in Lhuntse District, Bhutan

== People with the surname ==
- Frank Chulung, candidate of the Australian federal election, 1987
