= McGauran =

McGauran is a surname. Notable people with the surname include:

- Julian McGauran (born 1957), Australian politician
- Peter McGauran (born 1955), Australian politician
