= Section 13 of the Constitution of Australia =

Section 13 of the Constitution of Australia provides for three aspects of the terms of members of the Australian Senate: the timing of elections, the commencement date of their terms and for the Senate to allocate long (six-year) and short (three-year) terms following a double dissolution of the Parliament of Australia. While members of the House of Representatives and territory senators have a maximum three-year term, state senators have a fixed six-year term, subject only to the parliament being dissolved by a double dissolution.

== Timing of elections and commencement of terms ==
Senate elections must be held in the 12 months prior to the expiry of the fixed term of the senate. The constitution originally provided for senate terms on calendar years, beginning on 1 January and ending on 31 December 6 years later. The 1906 referendum changed the terms to begin on 1 July and end on 30 June, primarily to enable simultaneous elections to be held in March. The amendments were passed, being approved by 82.65% of voters with a majority in all six states. Despite the intention to hold elections in March, the first such Federal election was March 1983. The changes made to section 13 in 1906 are:

As soon as may be after the Senate first meets and after each first meeting of the Senate following a dissolution thereof, the Senate shall divide the senators chosen for each State into two classes, as nearly equal in number as practicable and the places of the senators of the first class shall become vacant at the expiration of ~~the third year~~ three years, and the places of those of the second class at the expiration of ~~the sixth year~~ six years, from the beginning of their term of service and afterwards the places of senators shall be vacant at the expiration of six years from the beginning of their term of service.

The election to fill vacant places shall be made ~~in the year at the expiration of which~~ within one year before the places are to become vacant.

For the purpose of this section the term of service of a senator shall be taken to begin on the first day of ~~January~~ July following the day of his election, except in the cases of the first election and of the election next after any dissolution of the Senate, when it shall be taken to begin on the first day of ~~January~~ July preceding the day of his election.

In relation to the commencement of terms, there is a subtle difference between a half senate election and a double dissolution. For a half senate election, the election can be held up to one year before the commencement of the new senate term on 1 July, which means there can be a considerable delay between the election and Senators taking their seats. For example, those elected at the 21 August 2010 election were required to wait 314 days before they took their seats. For a double dissolution, the terms are deemed to have commenced from the previous 1 July. This made no difference at the 2 July 2016 election where the backdating was just one day. The timing of the March 1983 election and May 1974 election meant that the "3-year" short term was less than 2.5 years.

== Allocation of terms ==
Most members of the Australian Senate ordinarily serve fixed six-year terms, with half-senate elections every three years. When the Senate was initially formed, and on seven occasions since then, the entire Senate has been elected at once. On those occasions, the Constitution of Australia provides for the Senate to choose which of its members will serve long (six-year) terms and which will serve short (three-year) terms. The Constitution does not provide a process for the allocation of terms and it is left to the Senate to decide itself. Thus if one party had a majority in the Senate, in theory the Senate could decide that members of that party receive long terms, with the result that following the next half Senate election, the party would retain a significant majority, grossly distorting the intentions of the voters. The Senate is constrained from acting in this way by concerns about the potential political controversy, rather than any provision in the Constitution to prevent such an outcome.

=== Number of Senators ===
There were originally six senators elected from each state for a total of 36 members. In 1948, Senate representation was increased to 10 senators for each state for a total to 60. In 1975, four senators were added to represent the territories, however their terms are synchronised with the House of Representatives. In 1984 the number of senators from each state was increased to 12, resulting in a total of 76.

=== Whole-senate elections ===
Apart from the first election, whole-senate elections have been a consequence of a double dissolution where both houses were dissolved to address a deadlock.

Following the first election, several methods of allocating short and long terms were considered (including drawing lots), but the method eventually adopted was that the first three senators (of six) to be elected in each state received six-year terms, and those with fewer votes received three-year terms. The senate has continued to allocate the longer terms to the first-elected senators from each state following every whole-senate election.

Election	Results	Membership afterwards
1901	1901 results	1901–1903 membership
1914	1914 results	1914–1917 membership
1951	1951 results	1951–1953 membership
1974	1974 results	1974–1975 membership
1975	1975 results	1975–1978 membership
1983	1983 results	1983–1985 membership
1987	1987 results	1987–1990 membership
2016	2016 results	2016–2019 membership

=== Electoral system ===
The electoral system used in the senate can affect the allocation of long and short terms after a double dissolution.

From 1901 the method of voting for the Senate was block voting, where each elector voted for as many candidates as there were vacancies. This system tended to result in all senators from a state belonging to the same party, the extreme of which was in the 1943 election where all 18 senators were members of the Labor party, with the following election in 1946 returning 15 of 18 senators for Labor, save for 2 Liberal and 1 Country senators from Queensland, meaning that from 1947 to 1950 Labor held 33 of the 36 Senate seats. The system did, however, make the allocation of terms simple. Thus in 1901 and 1914, the Senate resolved that the first three candidates elected would receive the long term.

=== Proportional representation ===
The voting system used for the Senate changed in 1949 to a single transferable vote, which is designed to achieve proportional representation. In 1950 the Menzies Government saw difficulties with Senate voting after a double dissolution and passed a bill for a referendum that would enable the voters to determine which Senators would have a long (six-year) term and which have a short (three-year) term. The bill was not passed by the Senate. While the Government could have requested the Governor-General submit the proposal to a referendum under section 128 of the Constitution, it did not do so and the bill lapsed at the 1951 double dissolution. Despite Prime Minister Menzies' claim that a deadlock was "next door to being inevitable" following a double dissolution, the Coalition government won a Senate majority, winning six of the ten senate seats in Queensland, and Western Australia.

In 1951 the Senate again resolved that the first five candidates elected would receive the long term, The result of this division was that 18 Coalition & 12 Labor Senators received long terms, while 14 Coalition & 16 Labor Senators received short terms.

The Joint Committee on Constitutional Review in 1959 considered that constitutional effect should be given to past practice of the allocation of terms according to their relative success at the election. While a bill was introduced to the Senate in 1964 by the opposition, it was not passed and no such referendum was held.

The Senate again resolved that the first five candidates elected would receive the long term following the double dissolution elections in 1974, 1975, and 1983.

== Proposed changes to the allocation of terms ==
Since 1984, each Australian state is represented in the Senate by twelve senators, and they serve for six years each, roughly double the term of a member of the House of Representatives. Half of these face re-election at each normal election. Following a double dissolution election, Australia's constitution re-establishes the rotation of senators by allowing the senate to allocate half of the elected state senators a short term. The same method has been used to allocate long (six-year) and short (three-year) terms on every occasion, though the voting system has changed during that time. That method is to allocate the longer terms to the senators who were elected first in each state.

Section 282 of the Commonwealth Electoral Act 1918 was introduced as an amendment in 1984 with the effect of providing access to another method of allocating short and long terms. In both of the double dissolution elections that have taken place since that section was added, two parties have collaborated to allocate themselves two extra long term seats by choosing the more favourable method. In both cases, this was the traditional method. Despite two senate resolutions to use the new method, it has never been employed.

Senators affected
Year of election	State represented	Party represented	Senator name	Term allocated	Collaborating parties	Reference
1987	NSW	Democrats	Paul McLean	Long	Labor/Democrats	
1987	NSW	Nationals	David Brownhill	Short	Labor/Democrats	
1987	VIC	Democrats	Janet Powell	Long	Labor/Democrats	
1987	VIC	Nationals	Julian McGauran	Short	Labor/Democrats	
1987	SA	Labor	Graham Maguire	Long	Labor/Democrats	
1987	SA	Liberal	Robert Hill	Short	Labor/Democrats	
1987	QLD	Liberal	Warwick Parer	Long	Labor/Democrats	
1987	QLD	Labor	Gerry Jones	Short	Labor/Democrats	
2016	NSW	Labor	Deborah O'Neill	Long	Liberal/Labor	
2016	NSW	Australian Greens	Lee Rhiannon	Short	Liberal/Labor	
2016	VIC	Liberal	Scott Ryan	Long	Liberal/Labor	
2016	VIC	Justice Party	Derryn Hinch	Short	Liberal/Labor	

=== Joint Select Committee ===
In 1983 the Joint Select Committee on Electoral Reform unanimously recommended an alternative "recount" method to reflect proportional representation. Their recommendations included:

- Following a double dissolution election, the Australian Electoral Commission conduct a second count, of Senate votes, using the half Senate quota, to establish the order of election to the Senate, and therefore the terms of election; and
- the practice of ranking Senators in accordance with their relative success at the election be submitted to electors at a referendum for incorporation, in: the Constitution, by way of amendment, so that the issue is placed beyond doubt and removed from the political arena.

=== 1984 legislation ===
Section 282 of the Commonwealth Electoral Act 1918 was introduced as an amendment in 1984 with the effect of providing access to another method of allocating short and long terms. The amendment requires the Australian Electoral Commission (AEC) to conduct a recount of all the votes in each state. This special recount provides a way to allocate long terms for half of the seats (presently six of twelve). The AEC makes the results of the special recount available to the Senate. However, the order of election of the twelve senators from each state, on which the traditional allocation method is based, is also made public as a result of transparency in the vote counting process. Thus the outcome of the legislation is that two systems for allocating seats are made available by the AEC to the Senate. Although the Senate is permitted by the constitution to use any method it pleases, these appear to be the only two methods that the Senate could get away with using without the parties responsible suffering a significant voter backlash at the next election.

The alternative allocation method introduced in 1984 has not yet been used. Following double dissolution elections in 1987 and 2016, the order-elected method continued to be used, despite Senate resolutions in 1998 and 2010 agreeing to use the new method. In both cases two parties worked together in the senate to allocate themselves two extra long term seats by choosing the more favourable method. In both cases, this was the traditional method.

Changes to the Electoral Act in 1984 by the Labor Hawke government included:

- an independent Australian Electoral Commission (AEC) was established to administer the federal electoral system.
- the number of senators was increased from 64 to 76 (12 from each State and two from each Territory), an increase of 12, and the number of members of the House of Representatives was increased from 125 to 148, an increase of 23.
- the group voting ticket voting system (the original "above-the-line" voting) was introduced.
- the registration of political parties was introduced to permit the printing of party names on ballot papers.
- public funding of election campaigns and disclosure of political donations and electoral expenditure was introduced.
- the compulsory enrolment and voting requirement was extended to cover Indigenous Australians.
- the franchise qualification was changed to Australian citizenship, though British subjects on the roll immediately before 26 January 1984 retained enrolment and voting rights.
- the grace period after an election is called before the electoral rolls are closed was extended to seven days and the time that polling places closed was changed from 8pm to 6pm.
- Section 282 was added, requiring the AEC to conduct a recount following a dissolution under section 57 of the Constitution as if only the elected candidates had been named on the ballot papers, and only half the number were to be elected. The constitution requires the Senate to allocate long and short term senate seats, and this provides one way of determining which senators are allocated which terms. As of 2016, this method had not yet been applied, despite two bipartisan senate resolutions in favour of using it as well as two double dissolution elections (1987 and 2016).

=== 1987 election ===
After the 1987 double dissolution election, the Coalition moved to use the recount method (based on the 1984 legislation introduced by Labor) to allocate terms. This was rejected by Labor and the Democrats, who ignored the unanimous recommendation for reform from the Joint Select Committee and the provisions of the Commonwealth Electoral Act, and instead maintained the previous (order-elected) system to allocate the long (six-year) terms ending on 30 June 1993 and short (three-year) terms ending on 30 June 1990. The effect of this decision was that Democrat Senators Paul McLean and Janet Powell got a long term instead of National Senators David Brownhill and Julian McGauran. There was no net effect on Labor and Liberal in that in South Australia, Labor Senator Graham Maguire got a long term instead of Liberal Senator Robert Hill, while in Queensland, Liberal Senator Warwick Parer got a long term instead of Labor Senator Gerry Jones. Senators took their seats immediately following the election on 11 July 1987. The four territory senators were elected in July 1987 and their terms ended at the next federal election, which was March 1990.

=== Senate resolutions ===
One of the reasons advanced for not using the alternative count in 1987 was that the method should only be adopted if the Senate passed a resolution before the double dissolution. To this end Labor Senator John Faulkner moved a motion in 1998 to use section 282 of the Commonwealth Electoral Act in a future double dissolution. It was noted in the debate that the motion could not bind the Senate in the future. In 2010 by Liberal Senator Michael Ronaldson introduced the same motion, which passed again with the support of both major parties, and without debate.

=== 2016 election ===
Despite the provisions of the Commonwealth Electoral Act and the bipartisan senate resolutions passed in 1998 and 2010 in support of the recount method, following the July 2016 double dissolution election, an agreement between Liberal's Mathias Cormann and Labor's Penny Wong led the Senate to choose the order-elected method again. As a result, in New South Wales, Labor's Deborah O'Neill got a six-year term at the expense of The Greens' Lee Rhiannon getting a three-year term, while in Victoria Liberal's Scott Ryan got a six-year term at the expense of the Justice Party's Derryn Hinch getting a three-year term. Both methods of allocation had the same outcome for all other senators.

== Comparison of methods ==
The older, conventional method, called the order-elected method (or similar) allocates the six longer terms in each state to the first six (of twelve) senators elected.

The newer method, called the recount method, attempts to allocate the six longer terms to those senators that would have been elected in a regular half-senate election. This requires the Electoral Commission to conduct a recount of all the ballots in each state. In this special recount, only the twelve elected senators are candidates and only six 'seats' are to be filled. The winners of the special recount would then receive the longer (six-year) terms, and the remainder get the shorter (three-year) terms. The first step in such a recount is to re-allocate votes for all other candidates (outside the twelve elected) according to their preferences. This differs from the normal practice of awarding seats to candidates with a full quota of first preference votes as the first step, prior to eliminating minor candidates. The rationale for limiting the recount to the twelve elected candidates is to eliminate the possibility of an unsuccessful candidate 'winning' a six-year term as a result of the complex preference flows.

=== Fairness and preferential voting ===
The recount method is generally described as fairer, on the basis that it better reflects preferential (instant runoff) voting and proportional representation through the allocation of long terms according to a method almost identical to that used in a normal half senate election, which combines preferential voting and proportional representation. The order-elected method is more analogous to the plurality (first past the post) method rather than preferential voting, in that the candidates elected earliest in the count have a higher proportion of first preference votes to preference votes distributed from eliminated candidates. For a single member electorate (e.g. in the lower house) a candidate must secure 50% ($\dfrac{1}{1+1}$) of the vote to win a seat under preferential voting, whereas for first past the post voting a candidate can theoretically win a seat with as few as ($\dfrac{1}{n}+1$) votes, where n is the number of candidates. For a six-member electorate with preferential voting (e.g., a normal half senate election and the recount method), a candidate must secure a quota of 14.28% ($\dfrac{1}{6+1}$), while for a 12-member electorate, a candidate requires 7.69% ($\dfrac{1}{12+1}$). The order-elected method requires the six 'winners' to only gain 7.69% ($\dfrac{1}{12+1}$) to obtain a long term. Thus, when there is a difference between the two outcomes, it reflects the fact that the order-elected method introduces some arbitrariness to the process, by not considering the preferences of up to 53.85% ($\dfrac{7}{12+1}$) of voters in allocating the first six seats. This arises from the fact that seats are 'awarded' as soon as a candidate gains a quota of votes, often before any minor candidates are eliminated and their preferences distributed. For example, if the most popular candidate has two full quotas of first preference votes, he gains the first seat, and all those votes are then distributed according to their preference, but at only half their original value. If they all then go to the same candidate, he will also have a full quota, and will be awarded a seat prior to the elimination of the least popular candidate. Thus a candidate who gains the sixth long term seat under the order-elected method, but not under the recount method, presumably gains more support from first preference votes and the redistribution of votes from elected candidates rather than from the redistribution of preferences from eliminated candidates.

It may at first appear that the order-elected method favours the major parties through this greater reliance on first preference votes, however in the two double dissolution elections in which the special recount has been conducted, the order-elected method benefited the Democrats by two seats, Labor by one (net) and Liberal by one (net) seat. This is because the first seats are awarded to candidates with the largest block of first preference votes, so the largest blocks are reduced first. The full quotas of first preference votes in support of the major parties are often exhausted by the time the sixth candidate is elected, so that the first preference votes given to a major party, to the extent they are distributed as a block, will fall anywhere between zero and one full quota in remaining value. This makes the difference in outcome between the two methods difficult to predict or generalise. It follows from the method definitions that the order-elected method will disadvantage those candidates who rely most heavily on accumulating preferences from eliminated candidates to gain the final seat in a normal half senate election. It is difficult to generalise about what type of candidate or party, if any, falls into this category in a consistent manner, though it may be the case that the smaller minor parties and independents who just scrape in, in a normal half senate election, will be consistently (but rarely) disadvantaged.

Only zero or one long term seat in each state has been affected by the difference between the two methods. It is however possible that more than one long term seat could be affected.

=== Commentary on methods ===
The following people have described the recount method as fairer:

- Antony Green
- Alastair Ficher, a Senior Lecturer in Economics from the University of Adelaide, who originally proposed the new method to the Joint Select Committee
- Labor's Bob Hawke, in passing the 1984 Legislation
- The candidates who would have benefited from it, such as Derryn Hinch and Lee Rhiannon in 2016
- Labor Senator Robert Ray in 1983
- Liberal Senator Baden Teague in 1987 appealed in parliament to use the new method on the basis of principle, fairness, honesty, conscience and maturity

The major parties supported the recount method in the Joint Select Committee on Electoral Reform in 1983 (which included Democrat, Labor and Liberal representatives), in passing the 1984 legislation and the 1998 and 2010 bipartisan senate resolutions.

In 2016, Labor Senate Leader Penny Wong described the order-elected method as consistent with convention and reflecting the will of voters. Liberal deputy Leader in the senate, Mathias Cormann described the order-elected method as the fairest and reflective of the will of the people.

== See also ==
- Electoral system of Australia

=== 1987 election ===
- Members of the Australian Senate, 1987–1990
- Results of the 1987 Australian federal election (Senate)
- 1987 Australian federal election § Senate results

=== 2016 election ===
- Members of the Australian Senate, 2016–2019
- Results of the 2016 Australian federal election (Senate)#Terms of senators
- 2016 Australian federal election
