= Members of the Australian Senate, 1987–1990 =

Senate composition at 14 September 1987
Government (32)
Labor (32) – (7 seat minority)

Opposition (34)
Liberal (27)
National Party (6)
Country Liberal (1)

Crossbench (10)
Democrats (7)
Nuclear Disarmament Party (1) (Note: The election of NDP Senator Robert Wood was void. Irina Dunn was elected in his place but was expelled from the NDP & served out the remainder of her term as an independent.)
Independent (2)

Changes in composition

This is a list of members of the Australian Senate from 1987 to 1990. It consisted of twelve senators for each of the six states of Australia and two senators representing each of the Northern Territory and the Australian Capital Territory. All members were elected at the 1987 election following a double dissolution of both houses of parliament, rather than the normal case of only half of the state senators facing election.

In accordance with section 13 of the Constitution, following a double dissolution of Parliament, the terms for senators commence on 1 July preceding the election – i.e., on 1 July 1987. The Senate decides which senators were allocated the full six-year terms ending on 30 June 1993 and which senators were allocated three-year terms ending on 30 June 1990. In 1983 the Commonwealth Electoral Act 1918 had been amended to include provision for a recount of ballot papers to determine the senators to get the long term vacancies. This was the result of a unanimous recommendation from the Joint Select Committee on Electoral Reform. Despite the unanimous recommendation for reform, Labor and the Democrats maintained the previous system where the first six senators elected in each state were allocated the full six-year terms ending on 30 June 1993 while the other half were allocated three-year terms ending on 30 June 1990. The effect of this system was that Democrat Senators Paul McLean and Janet Powell got a long term instead of National Senators David Brownhill and Julian McGauran. There was no net effect on Labor and Liberal in that in South Australia, Labor Senator Graham Maguire got a long term instead of Liberal Senator Robert Hill, while in Queensland, Liberal Senator Warwick Parer got a long term instead of Labor Senator Gerry Jones. Senators took their seats immediately following the election on 11 July 1987. The four territory senators were elected in July 1987 and their terms ended at the next federal election, which was March 1990.

Senator	Party	State	Term ending	Years in office
Richard Alston	Liberal	Victoria	1990	1986–2004
Brian Archer	Liberal	Tasmania	1993	1975–1994
Terry Aulich	Labor	Tasmania	1993	1984–1993
Michael Baume	Liberal	New South Wales	1993	1984–1996
Peter Baume	Liberal	New South Wales	1993	1974–1991
Michael Beahan	Labor	Western Australia	1990	1987–1996
Robert Bell (Note: Tasmanian Democrat Senator Norm Sanders resigned on 1 March 1990. Robert Bell was appointed as his replacement on 9 March.)	Democrats	Tasmania	1990	1990–1996
Bronwyn Bishop	Liberal	New South Wales	1990	1987–1994
Florence Bjelke-Petersen	National	Queensland	1993	1980–1993
John Black	Labor	Queensland	1990	1984–1990
Nick Bolkus	Labor	South Australia	1993	1981–2005
Ron Boswell	National	Queensland	1990	1983–2014
David Brownhill	National	New South Wales	1990	1984–2000
Bryant Burns	Labor	Queensland	1990	1987–1996
John Button	Labor	Victoria	1993	1974–1993
Paul Calvert	Liberal	Tasmania	1990	1987–2007
Ian Campbell (Note: Western Australian Liberal Senator Fred Chaney resigned on 27 February 1990. Ian Campbell was appointed as his replacement on 16 May.)	Liberal	Western Australia	1993	1990–2007
Fred Chaney	Liberal	Western Australia	1993	1974–1990
Grant Chapman	Liberal	South Australia	1990	1987–2008
Bruce Childs	Labor	New South Wales	1990	1980–1997
John Coates	Labor	Tasmania	1993	1980–1996
Bob Collins	Labor	Northern Territory	1990 (Note: The term of a territory senator ends at the dissolution of the House of Representatives, which was March 1990.)	1987–1998
Mal Colston	Labor	Queensland	1993	1975–1999
Peter Cook	Labor	Western Australia	1993	1983–2005
Barney Cooney	Labor	Victoria	1990	1984–2002
John Coulter	Democrats	South Australia	1990	1987–1995
Noel Crichton-Browne	Liberal	Western Australia	1990	1980–1996
Rosemary Crowley	Labor	South Australia	1990	1983–2002
John Devereux	Labor	Tasmania	1990	1987–1996
Ray Devlin	Labor	Tasmania	1990	1984–1990
Irina Dunn (Note: The election of New South Wales NDP Senator Robert Wood was declared void by the Court of Disputed Returns on 12 May 1988, after it was discovered that he was not an Australian citizen. The High Court had previously held that the presence of a person whose election was void did not invalidate the proceedings of the Senate. Irina Dunn, who had been the second candidate for the NDP on the Senate ballot paper, was elected on a re-count on 21 July. Dunn refused a request from the NDP to step down when Wood became a citizen (and thus eligible for appointment to the Senate), and was expelled from the party. Dunn served out the remainder of her term as an independent.)	Nuclear Disarmament/Independent	New South Wales	1990	1988–1990
Peter Durack (Note: Father of the Senate)	Liberal	Western Australia	1993	1970–1993
Gareth Evans	Labor	Victoria	1993	1977–1996
John Faulkner (Note: New South Wales Labor Senator Arthur Gietzelt resigned on 27 February 1989. John Faulkner was appointed as his replacement on 4 April.)	Labor	New South Wales	1993	1989–2015
Dominic Foreman	Labor	South Australia	1993	1980–1997
Arthur Gietzelt	Labor	New South Wales	1993	1970–1989
Patricia Giles	Labor	Western Australia	1993	1980–1993
Janine Haines (Note: South Australian Democrat Senator Janine Haines resigned on 1 March 1990. Meg Lees was appointed as her replacement on 4 April.)	Democrats	South Australia	1993	1977–1978, 1980–1990
David Hamer	Liberal	Victoria	1990	1977–1990
Brian Harradine	Independent	Tasmania	1993	1975–2005
Robert Hill	Liberal	South Australia	1990	1981–2006
Jean Jenkins	Democrats	Western Australia	1990	1987–1990
Gerry Jones	Labor	Queensland	1990	1980–1996
Sue Knowles	Liberal	Western Australia	1993	1984–2005
Meg Lees	Democrats	South Australia	1993	1990–2005
Austin Lewis	Liberal	Victoria	1993	1976–1993
David MacGibbon	Liberal	Queensland	1993	1977–1999
Michael Macklin	Democrats	Queensland	1990	1980–1990
Graham Maguire	Labor	South Australia	1993	1983–1993
Julian McGauran	National	Victoria	1990	1987–1990, 1993–2011
Jim McKiernan	Labor	Western Australia	1990	1984–2002
Paul McLean	Democrats	New South Wales	1993	1987–1991
Bob McMullan (Note: Australian Capital Territory Labor Senator Susan Ryan resigned on 29 January 1988. Bob McMullan was appointed as her replacement on 16 February.)	Labor	Australian Capital Territory	1990	1988–1996
Tony Messner (Note: South Australian Liberal Senator Tony Messner resigned on 17 April 1990. John Olsen was appointed as his replacement on 7 May.)	Liberal	South Australia	1993	1975–1990
John Morris	Labor	New South Wales	1990	1984–1990
Jocelyn Newman	Liberal	Tasmania	1990	1986–2002
Bill O'Chee (Note: Queensland National Senator John Stone resigned on 1 March 1990. Bill O'Chee was appointed as his replacement on 8 May.)	National	Queensland	1993	1990–1999
John Olsen	Liberal	South Australia	1993	1990–1992
John Panizza	Liberal	Western Australia	1990	1987–1997
Warwick Parer	Liberal	Queensland	1993	1984–2000
Kay Patterson	Liberal	Victoria	1990	1987–2008
Janet Powell	Democrats	Victoria	1993	1986–1993
Chris Puplick	Liberal	New South Wales	1990	1978–1980, 1984–1990
Robert Ray	Labor	Victoria	1990	1981–2008
Margaret Reid	Liberal	Australian Capital Territory	1990	1981–2003
Margaret Reynolds	Labor	Queensland	1993	1983–1999
Graham Richardson	Labor	New South Wales	1993	1983–1994
Susan Ryan	Labor	Australian Capital Territory	1990	1975–1988
Norm Sanders	Democrats	Tasmania	1990	1984–1990
Chris Schacht	Labor	South Australia	1990	1987–2002
Glen Sheil	National	Queensland	1990	1974–1981, 1984–1990
Jim Short	Liberal	Victoria	1993	1984–1997
Kerry Sibraa	Labor	New South Wales	1993	1975–1978, 1978–1994
John Stone	National	Queensland	1993	1987–1990
Grant Tambling	Country Liberal	Northern Territory	1990	1987–2001
Michael Tate	Labor	Tasmania	1993	1977–1993
Baden Teague	Liberal	South Australia	1990	1977–1996
Jo Vallentine	Independent	Western Australia	1990	1984–1992
Amanda Vanstone	Liberal	South Australia	1993	1984–2007
Peter Walsh	Labor	Western Australia	1993	1974–1993
Shirley Walters	Liberal	Tasmania	1993	1975–1993
John Watson	Liberal	Tasmania	1990	1978–2008
Robert Wood	Nuclear Disarmament	New South Wales	1990	1987–1988
Olive Zakharov	Labor	Victoria	1993	1983–1995
