= Jim Petrich =

Australian businessman

Cosmo James Petrich AM is an Australian businessman.

He lives in Yungaburra, Queensland.

== Awards and recognition ==
Petrich was awarded the Centenary Medal in 2001, cited for:

"long service and leadership to the grazing industry in the Northern Territory and Queensland"

He was made an officer of the Order of Australia (AM) in the 2005, cited for:

"service to the rural community, particularly regional and economic development on Cape York Peninsula"

Petrich is a Fellow of the Australian Institute of Company Directors.
