= Defence and Ex-Services Party =

Former political party in Australia

The Defence and Ex-Services Party of Australia was a minor Australian political party operating from 1986 to 1989. Formally registered on 1 September 1986, its policies included greater investment in care for veterans, a stronger national defence system, and maintenance of high disability pensions. The party contested the 1987 federal election, running for the Senate in New South Wales, and also the 1988 New South Wales state election. It was voluntarily deregistered on 4 May 1989.
