= Julian McGauran =

Australian politician (born 1957)

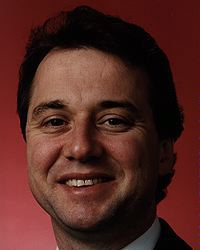

Senator for Victoria
- In office 11 July 1987 – 30 June 1990
- In office 1 July 1993 – 30 June 2011

Personal details
- Born: 5 March 1957 (age 69) Traralgon, Victoria, Australia
- Party: National (1987–2006); Liberal (2006–present)
- Relations: Peter McGauran (brother)
- Education: Monash University
- Occupation: Politician, teacher

Julian John James McGauran (born 5 March 1957) is an Australian former politician who served as a member of the Australian Senate, representing the state of Victoria. Elected as a member of the National Party, he resigned from the Nationals and joined the Liberal Party of Australia in February 2006. His brother, Peter McGauran, was the National member for Gippsland until 2008, and was the Minister for Agriculture in the Howard government.

== Background and early career ==
McGauran attended Xavier College in Kew, Melbourne. Before attending university, he worked in the stables for racehorse trainer Bart Cummings at Flemington Racecourse. He obtained a Bachelor of Economics from Monash University, then became a Certified Practising Accountant and then a company director for the McGauran Group of Companies, and a board member of the Victorian Employers' Chamber of Commerce and Industry between 1986 and 1988. He was elected to the Melbourne City Council 1985–1988, representing the Central Business District.

During his time at the Council, McGauran called for the popular vote of the Lord Mayor of Melbourne, instead of the traditional means of selection by fellow councillors, in an attempt to curtail the "invariable cronyism" of the Melbourne City Council at the time.

== Political career ==
=== National Party ===
McGauran won National Party preselection for a Senate seat in the 1987 double-dissolution election, and was subsequently elected. Following the announcement of the election results, other senators negotiated, against McGauran's objections, to allocate him a three-year rather than a six-year Senate term.

In 1990, due to the circumstances of a historic agreement forming a Coalition Senate ticket, he was required to step out of Parliament for three years. In 1993, he was re-elected to the Senate on the Coalition Senate ticket.

On 2 November 1989, McGauran introduced the End of War List (Private Members Bill) into the Senate. The Bill was passed unanimously in the Senate, and was aimed at recognising the "unsung heroes" of the Vietnam War. Although it was unsuccessful in the House of Representatives at the time, in 1999 the Howard Government did establish the War List, and more than 80 Vietnam Vets have been honoured for their acts of bravery since this time.

McGauran was a strong advocate for the freedom of East Timor. He campaigned from 1993 through to 1999 for the East Timor cause, against the then-policy of the major parties.

Diagnosed with malaria following a trek along the Kokoda Trail, McGauran ignored doctors' orders and flew to Canberra to speak on the controversial Euthanasia Laws 1996 Bill – supporting the Bill to overturn Northern Territory legislation legalising euthanasia. The debate saw the bill narrowly passed in the Senate. The following day he collapsed in his Melbourne office and spent the next week recovering in hospital.

In November 2000, McGauran called for an inquiry into an incident at the Royal Women's Hospital where an abortion was performed on a 32-week-old fetus. He argued a possible breach of the Victorian Crimes Act which creates an offence of child destruction after 28 weeks gestation had occurred. After years of public debate and argument, the issue was investigated by the Medical Practitioners Board of Victoria.

In 2001, McGauran became the first Federal MP to join the Australian Army as part of the Federal Government's MP exchange program. He joined 2RAR on exercise at Jimma training base in Queensland. McGauran documented his experience in a diary, later published.

Before the 2004 election, McGauran faced a pre-selection challenge from three party members, including a former staffer to Trade Minister Mark Vaile. McGauran retained National Party pre-selection after media reports suggested the federal coalition agreement would be endangered if he lost, and thus gained the guaranteed second position on the joint Liberal-National ticket and was re-elected.

On 11 August, after the Liberal-National Coalition narrowly won a vote in the Senate, he gave the finger to Labor Party senators on the floor of the Senate in response to comments. This prompted calls from Labor senators and Greens Senator Bob Brown that he be sacked as Deputy Government Whip in the Senate. Senate President Paul Calvert ruled that the gesture was "unseemly but not obscene."

In 2004, the McGauran family bankrolled the Democratic Labor Party's High Court challenge against the Australian Electoral Commission which was forcing the political party, under threat of deregistration to disclose party membership details.

Although the legal challenge was unsuccessful, the DLP survived, largely due to the support of Julian McGauran, who commented, "We had a serious interest in the outcome of the case, and our heart was with the DLP. I wouldn’t want to see them fade away".

McGauran's links to the DLP stem from his first Senate election win in 1987, when DLP preferences were critical in his narrow win over former Communist John Halfpenny.

In 2005, McGauran was accused of releasing to The Age newspaper the private patient records of a woman who had had an abortion, in breach of a Supreme Court suppression order; however, he denies this accusation. The then Victoria Health Minister, Bronwyn Pike, is quoted in the article as saying that McGauran was "exploiting this woman in pursuit of his own ideological agenda", describing the act as an assault on the doctor-patient relationship.

=== Liberal Party ===
On 23 January 2006, McGauran announced that he was resigning from the National Party and would apply to join the Liberal Party. He said there was no longer any significant policy difference between the Nationals and Liberals in Victoria at a federal level, and that he would be best able to represent rural Victorians as a member of the Liberal Party. His application was accepted by the Liberals on 3 February.

Rumours abounded that Liberal deputy leader and Treasurer Peter Costello, himself a Victorian, lobbied McGauran to switch parties. However, Costello and Howard denied this. Nonetheless, federal Nationals leader Mark Vaile condemned McGauran's defection as a betrayal, while state Nationals leader Peter Ryan claimed that McGauran would be "treated and reviled" as a deserter "for the rest of his days." One of the few Liberals who didn't welcome McGauran to the party was former Victorian premier Jeff Kennett, who called it "a gross act of disloyalty." McGauran's defection highlighted the historically strained relationship between the non-Labor parties in Victoria. The Liberals and Nationals sat separately for most of the second half of the 20th century; while they governed as a Coalition under Kennett, they had gone their separate ways after their shock defeat in 1999.

In 2009, McGauran was the first to speak up against the Liberal policy supporting the Government's Emissions Trading Scheme. He said he would not vote for the scheme in any form, in defiance of the then-Liberal leader Malcolm Turnbull.

In April 2010, McGauran, a long-time campaigner on censorship issues, called for the sacking of the Australian Classification Board Chairman for the Board's release of the formerly banned film Salò, or the 120 Days of Sodom by Pier Paolo Pasolini. McGauran described the movie as "a paedophile's treat" and a "handbook for deviants".

In the 2010 election, McGauran lost his Senate seat to the DLP. His term in the Senate expired 30 June 2011.

On 12 May 2011, The Age newspaper reported that "Senator Julian McGauran has accused Professor Graham Burrows of giving concocted evidence at the trial of Arthur Freeman, the man serving a life sentence for the murder of his daughter Darcey." The Age reported on McGauran's speech in the Australian Senate, saying "Senator McGauran said defence lawyers used Professor Burrows as a 'gun for hire' and 'psychiatrist of last resort', and one who will sing whatever song the defence wants".

On 21 June 2011, McGauran delivered his valedictory speech to the Senate. He referred to his recent performances as an extra in Opera Australia's season of The Pearl Fishers, saying "That is the thrill of politics: it is an opera. I hope I played it well. So now I leave the stage and the curtain must fall."

== Post-political career ==
McGauran was, until October 2021, a religion, ethics, and commerce & law teacher at Ivanhoe Girls' Grammar School. He has also taught at Marcellin College and Santa Maria College in Melbourne. As of 2023, he teaches at Sacred Heart Girls' College.
