= Les Flintoff =

Australian rules footballer (1930–2019)

Personal information
- Full name: Les Flintoff
- Born: 5 October 1930
- Died: 7 February 2019 (aged 88); Mornington, Victoria
- Original team: Warburton
- Height: 177 cm (5 ft 10 in)
- Weight: 78 kg (172 lb)

Playing career^{1}
Years	Club	Games (Goals)
1950–52	Richmond	17 (4)
- ^{1} Playing statistics correct to the end of 1952.

Leslie Francis Flintoff (5 October 1930 – 7 February 2019) was an Australian rules footballer who played with Richmond in the Victorian Football League (VFL).

In 1954, Flintoff was captain-coach of Ganmain that lost the South West Football League (New South Wales) grand final to Ariah Park Mirrool.

He was the father of Olympic hurdler Debbie Flintoff-King.

In 1987 he was an unsuccessful candidate on the National Party's Victorian Senate ticket.
