= Paul McLean (politician) =

Australian politician

Senator for New South Wales
- In office 11 July 1987 – 23 August 1991
- Succeeded by: Karin Sowada

Personal details
- Born: 13 March 1937 (age 89) Belmont, New South Wales, Australia
- Party: Australian Democrats
- Education: University of Newcastle
- Occupation: Army officer Social planner Schoolteacher

Paul Alexander McLean (born 13 March 1937) is an Australian advocate of banking reform and former Australian Democrats senator for New South Wales (1987–1991).

== Early life ==
McLean was born on 13 March 1937 in Belmont, New South Wales. He is the son of Kathleen (née Collins) and Harold Penrose McLean; his father worked as a coal miner.

McLean attended Belmont Public School and St Joseph's College, Hunters Hill. He went on to complete a Bachelor of Arts at the University of Newcastle. After completing National Service in 1956 he was a part-time officer in the Citizen Military Forces before joining the regular Australian Army in 1964. He held the rank of major and served as an instructor at the Officer Cadet School, Portsea. He also completed an exchange program with the Royal Army Educational Corps in England and West Germany. McLean resigned from the army in 1974 and worked as a social planner in Gosford under the Whitlam government's Australian Assistance Plan. He subsequently worked as a high school teacher from 1976.

== Politics ==
McLean joined the Australian Democrats upon the party's formation in 1977 and was soon elected to the state executive. He stood unsuccessfully for the party at the 1977, 1980, 1983 and 1984 federal elections.

Following the announcement of the 1987 Senate election results, McLean was one of four senators who received a six-year term as a consequence of which method was chosen to allocate the seats.

On 12 February 1991, he was prevented by the President of the Senate from tabling sensitive sub-judice documents on the Westpac foreign loans controversy. On 7 March, the President informed the Senate that the documents in question had been ordered to be published by the House of Representatives Standing Committee on Finance and Public Administration, that the managing director of Westpac Banking Corporation had indicated to the Committee that the bank would not contest the action to have the injunctions removed, and that in view of these developments, the ruling of 12 February was no longer operative. Senator McLean then tabled the documents by leave.

He resigned his Senate seat on 22 August 1991, in protest against an internal party coup to depose the leader Janet Powell, and was replaced by Karin Sowada.

He is the co-author (with James Renton) of the book Bankers and Bastards (Hudson Publishing, Hawthorn, 1992).
