= Graham Maguire =

Australian politician

Senator for South Australia
- In office 5 March 1983 – 30 June 1993

Personal details
- Born: 21 April 1945 (age 80) Adelaide, South Australia
- Party: Labor

Graham Ross Maguire (born 21 April 1945) is a former Australian politician. Born in Adelaide, South Australia, he was educated at the University of Adelaide and then the Australian National University in Canberra, becoming an economist. He was a ministerial advisor to South Australian Labor Premiers Don Dunstan, Des Corcoran and John Bannon. In 1983, he was elected to the Australian Senate as a Labor Senator for South Australia. He held the seat until his defeat in 1993.

Following the announcement of the 1987 Senate election results, Maguire was one of four senators who received a six-year term as a consequence of which method was chosen to allocate the seats.
