= Pensioner and Citizen Initiated Referendum Alliance =

Australian political party

The Pensioner and Citizen Initiated Referendum Alliance was a minor Australian political party active between 1990 and 1996. It was originally formed in 1982 as the Pensioner Party of Australia, but its name was changed in 1990. It generally supported the rights of pensioners and retirees, and was also notable as a strongly monarchist group. It was deregistered on 23 July 1999.
