= Warwick Parer =

Australian politician (1936–2014)

The Honourable Warwick Parer AM

Minister for Resources and Energy
- In office 11 March 1996 – 21 October 1998
- Prime Minister: John Howard
- Preceded by: David Beddall (Resources)
- Succeeded by: Nick Minchin (Industry, Science and Resources)

Senator for Queensland
- In office 22 November 1984 – 11 February 2000
- Preceded by: Kathy Martin
- Succeeded by: George Brandis

Personal details
- Born: 6 April 1936 Wau, Territory of New Guinea
- Died: 15 March 2014 (aged 77) Brisbane, Queensland, Australia
- Party: Liberal
- Education: University of Melbourne
- Occupation: Mining executive, politician

Warwick Raymond Parer, AM (6 April 1936 – 14 March 2014) was an Australian politician who served as a Senator for Queensland from 1984 to 2000. He was a member of the Liberal Party and served as Minister for Resources and Energy in the Howard government from 1996 to 1998.

== Early life ==
Parer was born in Wau in the Australian-administered Territory of New Guinea (present-day Papua New Guinea). His uncle Damien Parer was a war photographer who was killed by the Japanese in 1944. Parer was educated at St. Joseph's Nudgee College in Brisbane and at the University of Melbourne, where he received a Bachelor of Commerce.

== Politics ==
Parer became a member of the Senate in 1985. Following the announcement of the 1987 Senate election results, Parer was one of four senators who received a six-year term as a consequence of which method was chosen to allocate the seats.

From March 1996 to October 1998, Parer was Minister for Resources and Energy in John Howard's government. He retired from the Senate on 11 February 2000, and George Brandis was appointed to fill the casual vacancy.

Parer was president of the Queensland Liberal Party from 2006 until February 2008.

== Other activities ==
He was chair of the Coalition of Australian Governments Independent Energy Review Panel and a member of the Governing Council of the Old Parliament House (Qld).

He was appointed a Member of the Order of Australia in 2005.

He was also appointed chair of the Royal Brisbane and Women's Hospital Foundation in 2010, and chairman of the Board of Stanwell Corporation Limited in May 2012.

== Death ==
Parer died on Friday 14 March 2014, aged 77.

Political offices
Preceded by David Beddall	Minister for Resources and Energy; 1996–98	Succeeded by Nick Minchin; Minister for Industry, Science and Resources
