= David Brownhill =

Australian politician

The Honourable David Brownhill OAM

Senator for New South Wales
- In office 1 December 1984 – 14 April 2000
- Succeeded by: Sandy Macdonald

Personal details
- Born: 16 November 1935 (age 90) Mudgee, New South Wales, Australia
- Party: National Party of Australia

David Gordon Cadell Brownhill OAM (born 16 November 1935) is an Australian politician. He was a National Party of Australia member of the Australian Senate from the 1984 federal election until his resignation on 13 April 2000.

Brownhill was born on Beaudesert Station, near Mudgee. He was educated by correspondence, at Cullenbone Public School and Sydney Church of England Grammar School. He undertook national service training in 1954 and worked as a jackeroo in western New South Wales and on his family farm until establishing his own farm near Quirindi in 1959. He married Helen Julia Arnott on 26 September 1959. A long-serving member of the then-Country Party, he served on the party's state central council and state executive for almost twenty years and was a state and federal campaign director in the 1980s.

Brownhill was elected to the Senate at the 1984 election. Following the announcement of the 1987 Senate election results, other Senators negotiated, against Brownhill's objections, to allocate him a three-year rather than a six-year Senate term.

Brownhill was shadow parliamentary secretary to the leader of the National Party from 1989 to 1996 under Charles Blunt and Tim Fischer, was National Party whip from 1990 to 1993 and National Party Senate deputy leader from 1993 until his resignation. Following the Coalition's victory at the 1996 election, Brownhill served as Parliamentary Secretary for Primary Industries from 1996 to 1997 and as Parliamentary Secretary for Trade from March 1996 to October 1998, when he resigned from the ministry. He served on no fewer than 90 parliamentary inquiries during his time as senator.

Following his resignation from the Senate, Brownhill was the chairman of the Australian Wine and Brandy Corporation from 2000 until 2006.

Brownhill was awarded the Medal of the Order of Australia in the 2023 King's Birthday Honours for service to the Parliament of Australia.
