= Rosemary Crowley =

Australian politician (1938–2025)

The Honourable Rosemary Crowley AO
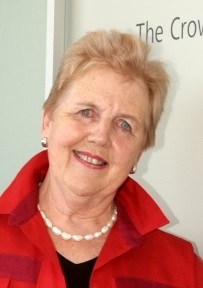
- Crowley in 2008

Minister for Family Services
- In office 24 March 1993 – 11 March 1996
- Prime Minister: Paul Keating
- Preceded by: Office established
- Succeeded by: Judi Moylan

Minister Assisting the Prime Minister for the Status of Women
- In office 24 March 1993 – 23 December 1993
- Prime Minister: Paul Keating
- Preceded by: Wendy Fatin
- Succeeded by: Ros Kelly

Senator for South Australia
- In office 5 March 1983 – 30 June 2002

Personal details
- Born: Rosemary Anne Willis; 30 July 1938 Melbourne, Victoria, Australia
- Died: 1 March 2025 (aged 86) Melbourne, Victoria, Australia
- Party: Labor (1983–2002)
- Spouse: James Raymond Crowley (m. 1964; sep. 1986)
- Education: University of Melbourne (MBBS)
- Occupation: doctor; politician

Rosemary Anne Crowley (née Willis; 30 July 1938 – 1 March 2025) was an Australian politician and doctor who served as a senator for South Australia from 1983 to 2002, representing the Australian Labor Party (ALP). Crowley made history as South Australia's first female ALP senator. During the Keating government, she held two ministerial positions: Minister for Family Services from 1993 to 1996, and Minister Assisting the Prime Minister for the Status of Women in 1993.

Before entering the Senate in 1983, Crowley was involved in community organisations, including school committees and community health, and was an original member of the Mental Health Tribunal in South Australia. With a strong interest in workplace health and safety from her professional background, she viewed herself as a passionate advocate for social justice and the rights of all Australians. As a senator, she championed various causes, including women's rights, childcare, nuclear disarmament, health care, and sport. Crowley played a key role in launching the Premier's Cup for women's sport in South Australia and the Prime Minister's Cup for women's netball, reflecting her commitment to women's sports. She also led the government investigation into women, sport, and the media, which resulted in the creation of the Women's Sports Unit within the Sport Commission in Canberra. Additionally, she advocated for government support for elite athletes and funding for community and school-based physical education and sports programs.

== Early life and education ==
Rosemary Anne Willis was born on 30 July 1938 in Melbourne, Victoria, Australia, as the second of six children to accountant Everard Joseph Willis and Monica Mary Willis (née Redmond). Her family, Roman Catholic upbringing, and education at Kilmaire Brigidine Convent in Hawthorn from 1943 to 1955 shaped her sense of social justice and dedication to community service.

In grade 8, she earned a Junior Government Scholarship, which allowed her to continue her studies for an additional four years and graduate with five other girls. From 1956 to 1961, she pursued her medical degree at the University of Melbourne on a Commonwealth Scholarship, ultimately completing her Bachelor of Medicine, Bachelor of Surgery (MBBS) there.

== Medical career ==
In 1962 and 1963, she worked at St. Vincent's Hospital in Melbourne as a junior resident medical officer (RMO) and then as a senior RMO. In 1964, she was employed as a pathologist at Melbourne's Royal Children's Hospital. She met James Raymond Crowley at university, where he studied law before switching to psychology, and they were married in 1964. From 1965 until 1969, they resided in Berkeley, California, where James was pursuing a doctorate. Crowley received training as a family and children's counsellor in Berkeley. In 1969, the couple moved back to Adelaide, where James was hired as a psychology lecturer at Flinders University.

From 1970 to 1971, Crowley worked as a junior clinical assistant in the pediatrics medical department at Adelaide Children's Hospital. From 1972 to 1974, she served as an assistant at the Medical and Veterinary Society of South Australia's Clinical Haematology Institute. She worked as a parent education counsellor at Clovelly Park Community Health Centre from 1975 to 1983, taught childbirth for the Mother and Babies Health Association (now Child and Family Health Service) from 1973 to 1983, and tutored at Flinders University Medical Department from 1975 to 1983. Additionally, she was a foundation member of the South Australian Mental Health Review Tribunal from 1980 to 1983.

== Political career ==
After becoming politically involved at Berkeley, Crowley joined the ALP shortly after returning to Australia. She celebrated the Whitlam government's election in 1972 and experienced the heartbreak of its removal in 1975. In 1974, she was elected junior vice-president, and in 1975, she became president of the ALP's Mitcham Branch. She contested the Mitcham seat in the South Australian House of Assembly against Australian Democrat Robin Millhouse in 1977 and 1979 but was unsuccessful. Crowley served as a delegate to the ALP State Council in 1979 and was a member of the ALP Women's Policy Steering Committee from 1979 to 1983, as well as a member of the Mental Health Review Tribunal in South Australia during the same period.

In 1982, Crowley ran unsuccessfully for preselection to the Unley seat in the House of Assembly. However, in March 1983, she placed fifth on the Australian Labor Party list for the double dissolution election and was preselected to represent the South Australian Labor Party in the Senate. She was the last senator elected, taking a month to realise she had won a three-year term. Crowley believed that political decisions were key to resolving issues like unemployment, poor health, and a lack of transportation, seeing a close connection between her work in politics and health. Reflecting in 1995, she noted that such problems could not be solved by a single doctor. During her first election campaign, she adopted the song "Bread and Roses," which symbolised her belief that freedom and basic needs must coexist. In her Senate debut, she emphasised that a person's quality of life is determined not only by their material needs but also by their freedom.

After placing first on the party ticket, Crowley was re-elected in December 1984, during the exciting time of the Hawke government's election. This period saw the enactment of the Sex Discrimination Act 1984 and other laws addressing women's rights and needs. Crowley joined the Senate at this time and became a member of the ALP Caucus committee on women's status. She also contributed to Labor's "Towards Equality" manifesto, which outlined policies for women ahead of the 1983 election. Crowley pushed for the legislation both in the Senate and within the party, calling it "earth-shattering."

Crowley was a supporter and defender of the Hawke government's social welfare and health policies during her first 10 years in the Senate as a government backbencher. She strongly advocated for the restoration of Medicare, the Whitlam government's universal health insurance program, as well as other health, occupational safety, and family reform initiatives. She played a key role in drafting child support legislation, introducing and enforcing child maintenance agreements, and securing Caucus approval for publicly financed, needs-based child care. From her first year in the Senate, she served on both standing and select committees focused on community health and social welfare, contributing to investigations on issues such as private hospitals, nursing homes, institutionalised children, income support for the elderly, human embryo experiments, accommodations for individuals with disabilities, and various social welfare reform bills.

Crowley was re-elected in July 1987 and subsequently chaired the Select Committee on Health Legislation and Health Insurance from 1989 to 1990, which produced the 1990 report What Price Care? She was re-elected again in March 1990. In 1991, following recommendations from the Expenditure Review Committee, the Hawke government introduced amendments to health insurance laws, including a A$3.50 Medicare co-payment. As a member of the ALP Caucus committee reviewing the package, Crowley publicly stated, "We are looking at the death of Medicare" after the modification was approved. She also opposed the measure within the party. Despite her opposition, Bob Hawke pushed forward with the policy, resulting in the Health Insurance Amendment Act 1991, though Crowley agreed to a reduction of the co-payment to A$2.50. The issue became a key point in the 1991 ALP leadership contest when Paul Keating promised to abolish the co-payment if he became leader. Keating, backed by the centre-left, was elected leader and prime minister in December 1991, and the co-payment was eliminated in February 1992. In response to the Liberal Party's 1992 "Fightback!" package, which sought to eliminate bulk billing, she boldly declared, "I will take the fight about Medicare anywhere, any time to the people of this country and beat the Opposition on Fightback dead."

During her term in the Senate, Crowley held two ministerial positions: Minister for Family Services from 24 March 1993 to 11 March 1996, and Minister Assisting the Prime Minister for the Status of Women from 24 March to 23 December 1993. The former was a junior ministry within the Department of Health, Housing, Local Government and Community Services. Throughout her ministerial career, Crowley played a key role in implementing the Child Care Rebate Act 1993. She also championed reforms focused on 'family services,' such as increasing financial assistance for families, expanding maternity allowances, enhancing disability support, and introducing carers' pensions and youth training initiatives. Childcare was a priority, and the Keating government expanded childcare places. Crowley introduced legislation for cash rebates and home childcare allowances for working families. In December 1993, her department's guidelines for childcare accreditation sparked controversy, particularly the requirement that Christmas carols, considered 'culturally irrelevant' for some children, not be played constantly. This was misinterpreted as a 'ban on carols,' and despite intense criticism, especially from female members of the Opposition, Crowley remained steadfast in the face of heckling.

Crowley spoke at a plenary session of the UN General Assembly in 1995 during the International Year of the Family. She was re-elected in March 1996, but after Labor's loss in the federal election that same year, she turned her attention to Senate committees. As chair of the Employment, Education, and Training References Committee, she led investigations into early childhood education, government school funding, adult education, and the teaching profession. In 1997, she was invited as the keynote speaker at the "Women in Parliament" conference in New Delhi, marking the 50th anniversary of Indian independence. In 1998, she moved to the Community Affairs References Committee, where she oversaw inquiries into the Gene Technology Bill, public hospital funding, child migration, nursing, the tax system, and childbirth practices.

On 11 September 2001, while in New York preparing to speak at a special session of the UN, the World Trade Center buildings were attacked. Due to age restrictions for ALP pre-selection, Crowley did not submit a nomination for the 2001 election. In her farewell address on 27 June 2002, senators from all parties praised her work ethic, sense of humour, and dedication to a more just society. Crowley left politics on 30 June 2002.

== Later life and death ==
After leaving the Senate, Crowley chaired several consultative bodies for the South Australian Rann government, including the Children's Interests Bureau from 2003, Young Media Australia from 2004 to 2005, the South Australian Council for the Care of Children from 2006 to 2007, the Power Line Environment Committee from 2005, and the South Australian Ministerial Advisory Board on Ageing from 2007. She also remained in high demand as a speaker on women's issues and parliamentary matters.

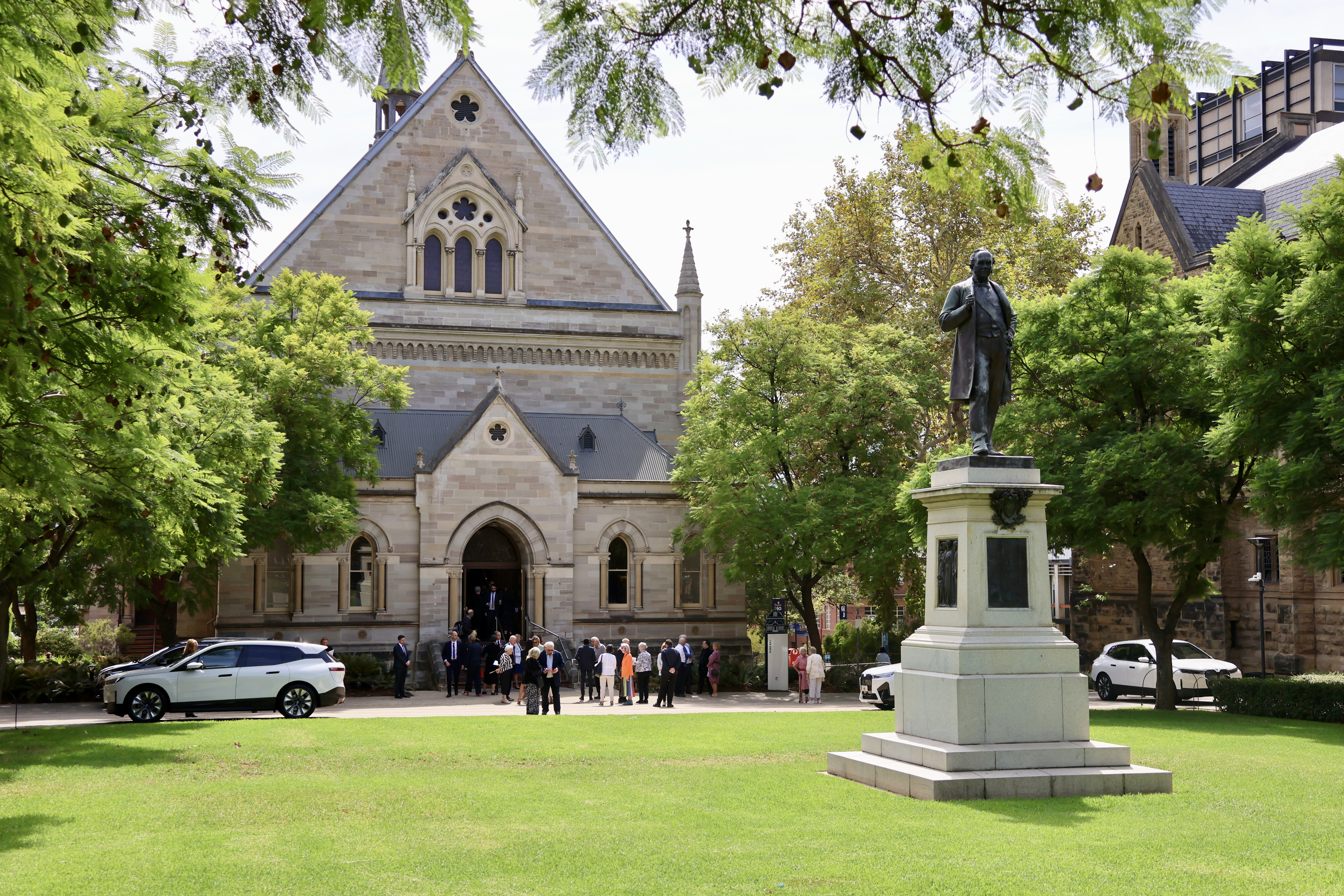
State memorial service for Crowley at Elder Hall, University of Adelaide

Crowley died on 1 March 2025, at the age of 86, in Melbourne. Following her death, Peter Malinauskas and Vincent Tarzia expressed their condolences in a ministerial statement in the House of Assembly on 4 March 2025. Malinauskas praised her steadfast support for progressive change, women's rights, and social justice, while Tarzia highlighted her lasting impact on South Australian health and family services and her role in opening doors for women in politics. On 7 March 2025, Penny Wong honoured Crowley as a trailblazer, mentor, and fervent advocate for women in politics, describing her as strong, clever, cheeky, and sharp-minded, with the courage and determination to overcome obstacles. In tribute, the Australian national flag was flown at half-mast on 22 March 2025 at all Australian government buildings in South Australia and the Australian Capital Territory. A state memorial service for Crowley took place on the same day at 11:00 a.m. in Elder Hall at the University of Adelaide.

== Personal life ==
Crowley married James Raymond Crowley in 1964, and together they had three children. The couple separated in 1986. She lived in Adelaide with her children.

== Awards and honours ==
In the 2015 Australia Day Honours, Crowley was appointed an Officer of the Order of Australia for her distinguished service to the Parliament of Australia as a minister and senator representing South Australia, as well as for her advocacy in promoting the status of women.
