= John Halfpenny =

Australian politician

John Francis Halfpenny AM (7 April 1935 – 20 December 2003) was an Australian trade unionist.

== Biography ==
Halfpenny was born in Donald in Victoria and joined the Communist Party, travelling to Moscow in 1960 as head of the Eureka Youth League. A metal worker, he became an organiser for the Amalgamated Engineering Union in 1969 and was elected its secretary in 1970. In 1972, he became state secretary of the Amalgamated Metal Workers Union. Halfpenny resigned from the Communist Party in 1979 and joined the Australian Labor Party in 1982, running unsuccessfully for the Senate in 1987. He was secretary of the Victorian Trades Hall Council (VTHC) from 1987 to 1995 and also served as an executive of the Australian Council of Trade Unions.

In 1995 he was awarded the Rostrum Victoria Award of Merit, an award for prominent Victorians who have earned a reputation for excellence in the art of public speaking over a considerable period and demonstrated an effective contribution to the spoken word through the spoken word. He was appointed a Member of the Order of Australia in the Australia Day Honours of 26 January 1998. In December 1998, he was fined $4,000, but not convicted, for falsely claiming $26,000 in compensation while employed by the VTHC. In February 2000 he came to public attention again when he sought damages for an ankle injury he had sustained on his way to work 46 years earlier, in 1954.

== Death ==
Halfpenny died at home with his wife Karen and daughter Lucy in 2003, aged 68, from heart disease in Hobart, Tasmania.

== Family ==
His first daughter, Bronwyn, is a member of the Victorian Parliament for the seat of Thomastown, which she holds with a margin of 28.4%. She was first elected in 2010 Victorian state election and was re-elected at the most recent Legislative Assembly election. John's third wife Karen Halfpenny gave him a daughter, Lucy (20.05.1992)
