= Bryant Burns =

Australian politician (1929–2007)

Senator for Queensland
- In office 11 July 1987 – 30 June 1996

Personal details
- Born: 24 March 1929 Rockhampton, Queensland, Australia
- Died: 29 May 2007 (aged 78) Brisbane, Queensland, Australia
- Party: Labor
- Occupation: Welder, trade unionist

Bryant Robert Burns (24 March 1929 – 29 May 2007) was an Australian politician. He was a member of the Australian Labor Party (ALP) and served as a Senator for Queensland from 1987 to 1996. He was a welder by profession and was state president of the Amalgamated Metal Workers' Union (AMWU) before entering parliament.

== Early life ==
Burns was born on 24 March 1929 in Rockhampton, Queensland, the son of Alice Charlotte (née Wassman) and Charles Robert Burns. He attended Leichhardt Ward Boys' School, leaving at the age of 13. He worked as a stockman and horsebreaker in North Queensland for three years before returning to Rockhampton. He subsequently completed an apprenticeship as a boilermaker at the Rockhampton Railway Workshops.

== Career ==
In 1956, Burns began working as a welder for the Brisbane City Council. He later worked at the Kangaroo Point shipyard before becoming an organiser with the Boilermakers' and Blacksmiths' Society in 1969. His union was subsequently merged into the Amalgamated Metal Workers' Union (AMWU), of which he became state president in 1977.

== Politics ==
Burns was an unsuccessful ALP candidate for the Senate at the 1984 federal election. A member of the Labor Left faction, he secured the backing of outspoken left-winger George Georges and was elevated to a winnable position on the party's ticket at the 1987 election. He was re-elected at the 1990 election and retired at the end of his term in 1996. He was a deputy whip from 1993 to 1996.

In his maiden speech, Burns vowed to "fight fervently" against the Hawke government's privatisation initiatives. However, he ultimately voted in favour of the partial privatisation of Qantas. He supported Bob Hawke against Paul Keating in the June 1991 leadership spill, but was later publicly critical of Hawke's over the government's decision to introduce a co-payment for Medicare.

In 1994, Burns was reprimanded by the President of the Senate Michael Beahan after calling Liberal frontbencher Amanda Vanstone "fatty".

== Personal life and death ==
Burns had seven children with his wife Lorraine, who died in 1974. He later remarried.

Burns died in Brisbane on 29 May 2007, at the age of 78.
