= 1990 Australian Senate election =

Australian federal election results

1990 Australian Senate elections
- 24 March 1990

40 of the 76 seats in the Australian Senate 39 seats needed for a majority
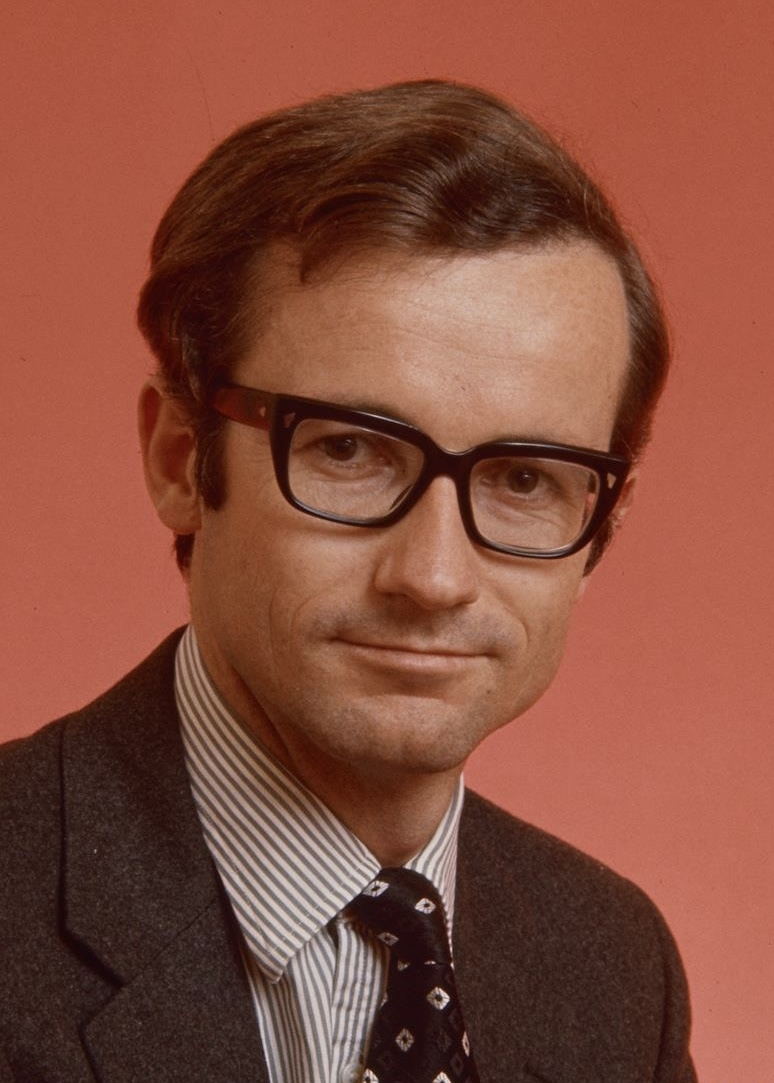

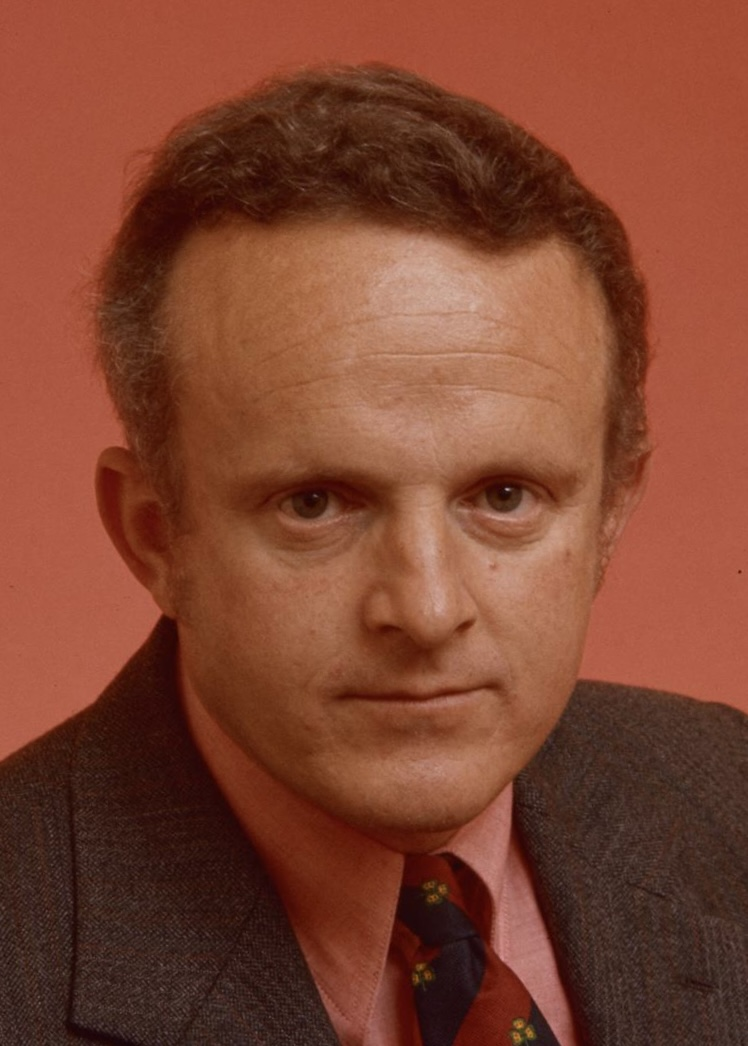

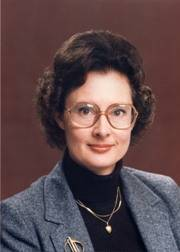

	First party	Second party
Leader	Fred Chaney (retired)	John Button
Party	Liberal–National Coalition	Labor
Leader since	11 March 1983	7 November 1980
Leader's seat	Western Australia	Victoria
Seats before	34	32
Seats after	34	32
Seat change	0	0
Popular vote	4,162,633	3,813,547
Percentage	41.92%	38.41%
Swing	▼0.12%	▼4.42%
	Third party	Fourth party
Leader	Janine Haines	None
Party	Democrats	Greens
Leader since	18 August 1986
Leader's seat	South Australia	None
Seats before	7	0
Seats won		1
Seats after	8	1
Seat change	▲1	▲1
Popular vote	1,253,807	208,157
Percentage	12.63%	2.10%
Swing	▲4.15%	▲1.66%
- Senators elected in the 1990 federal election
Leader of the Senate before election
John Button
Labor
Elected Leader of the Senate
John Button
Labor

The following tables show state-by-state results in the Australian Senate at the 1990 federal election. Senators total 31 coalition (29 Liberal, one coalition National, one CLP), 32 Labor, one WA Green, three non-coalition National, eight Democrats, and one independent. Senator terms are six years (three for territories), and took their seats from 1 July 1990, except the territories who took their seats immediately.

== Australia ==
Senate (STV GV) — 1990–93 — Turnout 95.81% (CV) — Informal 3.40%
Party	Votes	%	Swing	Seats won	Seats held	Change
Liberal–National joint ticket	2,429,552	24.47	+10.71	5	N/A	N/A
Liberal	1,445,872	14.56	–6.41	12	29	▲2
National	258,164	2.60	−4.49	1	4	▼2
Country Liberal	29,045	0.29	+0.08	1	1	Steady
Liberal–National coalition	4,162,633	41.92	–0.12	19	34	Steady
Labor	3,813,547	38.41	−4.42	15	32	Steady
Democrats	1,253,807	12.63	+4.15	5	8	▲1
Greens (Note: There was no federal Australian Greens party at this election. The Greens total includes Greens Western Australia (76,381 and elected one senator), NSW Green Alliance (64,583), Victorian Greens (23,420), Greens South Australia (19,499), United Tasmania Group (14,160), ACT Green Democratic Alliance (5,288), Greens New South Wales (4,826) and Australian Gruen (4,826).)	208,157	2.10	+1.66	1	1	▲1
Call to Australia	136,522	1.37	–0.09			
Environment Inds	74,668	0.75	+0.75			
Independent EFF	63,378	0.64	+0.64			
Nuclear Disarmament (Note: The election of Nuclear Disarmament Senator Robert Wood was void. Irina Dunn was declared elected in his place but was expelled from the party and served out the remainder of her term as an independent.)	38,079	0.38	–0.71			▼1
Grey Power	37,600	0.38	+0.38			
Democratic Socialist	36,140	0.36	+0.36			
AAFI	19,439	0.20	+0.20			
Pensioner	18,235	0.18	+0.00			
Democratic Labor	14,744	0.15	–0.39			
New Australia	8,332	0.08	+0.08			
Conservative	7,381	0.07	+0.07			
Citizens Electoral Council	7,129	0.07	+0.07			
Independents (Note: Jo Vallentine had been re-elected in 1987 as an independent however she joined the Greens for this election. The sitting independent was Brian Harradine.)	29,974	0.30	–1.59		1	▼1
Total	9,929,765			40	76	
Invalid/blank votes	349,065	3.40	–0.64			
Turnout	10,728,830	95.81				
Registered voters	10,728,131					
Source: Federal Elections 1990

== New South Wales ==
Elected	#	Senator	Party
1990
1990	1	Stephen Loosley	Labor
1990	2	Bronwyn Bishop	Liberal
1990	3	Bruce Childs	Labor
1990	4	David Brownhill	National
1990	5	Vicki Bourne	Democrats
1990	6	Suzanne West	Labor
1987
1987	1	Kerry Sibraa	Labor
1987	2	Michael Baume	Liberal
1987	3	John Faulkner	Labor
1987	4	Peter Baume	Liberal
1987	5	Graham Richardson	Labor
1987	6	Paul McLean	Democrats

1990 Australian federal election: Senate, New South Wales
Party	Candidate	Votes	%	±%
Quota		476,878		
Labor	1. Stephen Loosley (elected 1); 2. Bruce Childs (elected 3); 3. Sue West (elected 6); 4. John McCarthy	1,356,430	40.6	−1.8
Coalition	1. Bronwyn Bishop (Lib) (elected 2); 2. David Brownhill (Nat) (elected 4); 3. Chris Puplick (Lib); 4. Geoffrey Anderson (Lib)	1,280,382	38.4	−2.0
Democrats	1. Vicki Bourne (elected 5); 2. Karin Sowada; 3. William Cole; 4. Dorothy Thompson	393,521	11.8	+2.7
Call to Australia	1. Kevin Hume; 2. John Everingham	69,744	2.1	−1.3
Green Alliance	1. Ian Cohen; 2. Christopher Kirkbright; 3. Sue Arnold; 4. Jo Faith; 5. Jane Beckmann	64,583	2.0	+2.0
Independent EFF	1. George Turner; 2. Alan Gourley; 3. Bill Garing; 4. Jim Shanks; 5. Dallas Clarnette; 6. June Smith	63,378	1.9	+1.9
Nuclear Disarmament	1. Robert Wood; 2. Samantha Trenoweth	34,765	1.0	−0.5
Environment Inds	1. Irina Dunn; 2. Peter Prineas; 3. Harry Recher	27,046	0.8	+0.8
Grey Power	1. Robert Clark; 2. Theo Hetterscheid; 3. Walter Radimey	18,068	0.5	+0.5
New Australia	1. Oscar Landicho; 2. Onsy Mattar; 3. Len Hajjar; 4. Sam Ressitis; 5. Reginaldo Conti; 6. Warren Rogan	8,332	0.2	+0.2
Citizens Electoral Council	1. Lex Stewart; 2. Leone Hay; 3. John Doran	7,129	0.2	+0.2
Greens	1. Daniela Reverberi; 2. Jenys Newton	4,826	0.1	−0.9
Group L	1. Colin Wilson; 2. Glenn Wilson	3,846	0.1	+0.1
Group C	1. Ian Murphy; 2. Anne Murphy	2,201	0.1	+0.1
Group D	1. Alan Wilkinson	1,583	0.1	+0.1
Independent	Zero-Population Growth	924	0.0	0.0
Independent	Lord Rolo	352	0.0	0.0
Independent	Abraham Lincoln	208	0.0	0.0
Independent	Ian Monk	203	0.0	0.0
Independent	Bill Smith	150	0.0	0.0
Independent	Bob Sutherland	131	0.0	0.0
Independent	John Henshaw	124	0.0	0.0
Independent	Peter Consadine	71	0.0	0.0
Independent	Evalds Erglis	63	0.0	0.0
Independent	Harry Hnoudakis	37	0.0	0.0
Independent	Reen Dixon	28	0.0	0.0
Independent	Gene Pierson	17	0.0	0.0
Total formal votes		3,338,142	95.8	+0.7
Informal votes		145,429	4.2	−0.7
Turnout		3,483,571	95.9	+1.4

== Victoria ==
Elected	#	Senator	Party
1990
1990	1	Richard Alston	Liberal
1990	2	Robert Ray	Labor
1990	3	Kay Patterson	Liberal
1990	4	Barney Cooney	Labor
1990	5	Rod Kemp	Liberal
1990	6	Sid Spindler	Democrats
1987
1987	1	John Button	Labor
1987	2	Austin Lewis	Liberal
1987	3	Janet Powell	Democrats
1987	4	Gareth Evans	Labor
1987	5	Jim Short	Liberal
1987	6	Olive Zakharov	Labor

1990 Australian federal election: Senate, Victoria
Party	Candidate	Votes	%	±%
Quota		368,503		
Coalition	1. Richard Alston (Lib) (elected 1); 2. Kay Patterson (Lib) (elected 3); 3. Rod Kemp (Lib) (elected 5); 4. Julian McGauran (Nat); 5. Peter Coatman (Lib); 6. Severn Clarke (Lib)	1,149,170	44.5	+3.2
Labor	1. Robert Ray (elected 2); 2. Barney Cooney (elected 4); 3. Kim Carr; 4. Carole Marple; 5. Roger Lowrey	938,245	36.4	−7.6
Democrats	1. Sid Spindler (elected 6); 2. Jill O'Brien; 3. Hans Paas; 4. Christine Craik	365,376	14.2	+5.7
Call to Australia	1. Al Watson; 2. George Khoury	29,608	1.1	−0.1
Greens	1. Ken McGregor; 2. Alf Bamblett; 3. Pauline Scott	23,420	0.9	+0.9
AAFI	1. Denis McCormack; 2. Robyn Spencer	19,439	0.7	+0.7
Environment Inds	1. Gordon McQuilten; 2. Claire McLeod	16,655	0.6	+0.6
Pensioner	1. Neil McKay; 2. Fred Grant	15,447	0.6	−0.1
Democratic Labour	1. Robert Semmel; 2. Jean Taylor	14,744	0.6	−1.5
Group F	1. Peter Robinson; 2. John Giltinan	3,903	0.1	+0.1
Independent	Athol Guy	2,023	0.1	+0.1
Independent	Chris Vassis	728	0.0	0.0
Independent	Mabel Cardinal	227	0.0	0.0
Independent	Joe Toscano	215	0.0	0.0
Independent	Deborah Goudappel	119	0.0	0.0
Independent	Edward Fraser	89	0.0	0.0
Independent	Don Meggs	82	0.0	0.0
Independent	James Bernard	30	0.0	0.0
Total formal votes		2,579,520	96.4	+0.4
Informal votes		96,171	3.6	−0.4
Turnout		2,675,691	96.2	+0.9

== Queensland ==
Elected	#	Senator	Party
1990
1990	1	Gerry Jones	Labor
1990	2	Ian Macdonald	Liberal
1990	3	Bryant Burns	Labor
1990	4	John Herron	Liberal
1990	5	Ron Boswell	National
1990	6	Cheryl Kernot	Democrats
1987
1987	1	Margaret Reynolds	Labor
1987	2	Flo Bjelke-Petersen	National
1987	3	David MacGibbon	Liberal
1987	4	Mal Colston	Labor
1987	5	Bill O'Chee	National
1987	6	Warwick Parer	Liberal

1990 Australian federal election: Senate, Queensland
Party	Candidate	Votes	%	±%
Quota		239,121		
Labor	1. Gerry Jones (elected 1); 2. Bryant Burns (elected 3); 3. John Black; 4. Greg Vicary	653,070	39.0	−3.0
Liberal	1. Ian Macdonald (elected 2); 2. John Herron (elected 4); 3. Carmel Draper	490,523	29.3	+11.3
National	1. Ron Boswell (elected 5); 2. Glen Sheil; 3. Beth Honeycombe; 4. Jim Mason	227,696	13.6	−15.1
Democrats	1. Cheryl Kernot (elected 6); 2. Tony Walters; 3. Brian Stockwell; 4. John Brown	209,030	12.5	+5.0
Environment Inds	1. Peter James; 2. John Jones	30,967	1.8	+1.8
Democratic Socialist	1. Maurice Sibelle; 2. Karen Fletcher	26,300	1.6	+1.6
Call to Australia	1. Rona Joyner; 2. Wilfred Blake; 3. Bernice King; 4. Ross Maclean	18,469	1.1	+1.1
Grey Power	1. Ron Alford; 2. Felix Cernovs	9,237	0.5	+0.5
Conservative	1. Sydney Volker; 2. Loraine Morrison	4,414	0.3	+0.3
Group F	1. Barry Weedon; 2. Margaret Crompton	2,564	0.1	+0.1
Independent	Vincent Burke	946	0.1	+0.1
Independent	Steve Demetriou	613	0.0	0.0
Independent	Clemens Vermeulen	250	0.0	0.0
Independent	Mark Cresswell	117	0.0	0.0
Total formal votes		1,674,196	97.5	+0.6
Informal votes		42,112	2.5	−0.6
Turnout		1,716,308	95.1	+2.6

== Western Australia ==
Elected	#	Senator	Party
1990
1990	1	Noel Crichton-Browne	Liberal
1990	2	Jim McKiernan	Labor
1990	3	John Panizza	Liberal
1990	4	Michael Beahan	Labor
1990	5	Winston Crane	Liberal
1990	6	Jo Vallentine	WA Greens
1987
1987	1	Peter Walsh	Labor
1987	2	Ian Campbell	Liberal
1987	3	Patricia Giles	Labor
1987	4	Peter Durack	Liberal
1987	5	Peter Cook	Labor
1987	6	Sue Knowles	Liberal

1990 Australian federal election: Senate, Western Australia
Party	Candidate	Votes	%	±%
Quota		129,729		
Liberal	1. Noel Crichton-Browne (elected 1); 2. John Panizza (elected 3); 3. Winston Crane (elected 5); 4. Bernie Masters	392,820	43.3	+4.2
Labor	1. Jim McKiernan (elected 2); 2. Michael Beahan (elected 4); 3. Mark Bishop; 4. John Cowdell	304,632	33.5	−9.6
Democrats	1. Jean Jenkins; 2. Richard Jeffreys; 3. Barbara Churchward	85,324	9.4	+3.7
Greens WA	1. Jo Vallentine (elected 6); 2. Christabel Bridge; 3. Gladys Yarran	76,381	8.4	+3.6
National	1. Michael Jardine; 2. Brian English; 3. Josephine Walton	26,801	3.0	−2.5
Grey Power	1. Doug Ratcliffe; 2. Jack Webb	8,781	1.0	+1.0
Democratic Socialist	1. Catherine Brown; 2. Kylie Budge	4,883	0.5	+0.5
Conservative	1. Brady Williams; 2. Charles Bussell; 3. Laurence Molloy	2,967	0.3	+0.3
Pensioner	1. Maureen Grierson; 2. Gordon Munn	2,788	0.3	+0.3
Independent	Phillip Achurch	1,040	0.1	+0.1
Independent	Mitchell Faircloth	958	0.1	+0.1
Independent	Barbara Stark	514	0.1	+0.1
Independent	Ted Quinlan	209	0.0	0.0
Total formal votes		908,098	97.1	+0.4
Informal votes		26,733	2.9	−0.4
Turnout		934,831	95.1	+0.7

== South Australia ==
Elected	#	Senator	Party
1990
1990	1	Robert Hill	Liberal
1990	2	Rosemary Crowley	Labor
1990	3	John Coulter	Democrats
1990	4	Baden Teague	Liberal
1990	5	Chris Schacht	Labor
1990	6	Grant Chapman	Liberal
1987
1987	1	Dominic Foreman	Labor
1987	2	John Olsen	Liberal
1987	3	Meg Lees	Democrats
1987	4	Nick Bolkus	Labor
1987	5	Amanda Vanstone	Liberal
1987	6	Graham Maguire	Labor

1990 Australian federal election: Senate, South Australia
Party	Candidate	Votes	%	±%
Quota		129,732		
Liberal	1. Robert Hill (elected 1); 2. Baden Teague (elected 4); 3. Grant Chapman (elected 6); 4. Ivan Venning	376,073	42.6	+0.1
Labor	1. Rosemary Crowley (elected 2); 2. Chris Schacht (elected 5); 3. Gay Thompson; 4. Jim Hyde	337,137	37.1	−7.5
Democrats	1. John Coulter (elected 3); 2. Graham Pamount; 3. Judy Smith; 4. Pat Macaskill	149,158	16.3	+8.5
Green Alliance	1. Deborah White; 2. Philippa Skinner; 3. Colin Hunt	19,499	2.1	+1.2
Call to Australia	1. David Squirrell; 2. Colin Sinclair	18,701	2.1	+2.1
National	1. Neville Agars; 2. Gary Hamdorf	3,667	0.4	−3.1
Grey Power	Jack Holder	1,514	0.2	+0.2
Group B	1. Tania Mykyta; 2. Lizz Higgins	1,091	0.1	+0.1
Group F	1. F Rieck; 2. Heather Shephard	928	0.1	+0.1
Independent	Anastasios Giannouklas	187	0.0	0.0
Independent	Jack King	168	0.0	0.0
Total formal votes		908,123	97.5	+1.3
Informal votes		23,438	2.5	−1.3
Turnout		931,561	96.4	+1.9

== Tasmania ==
Elected	#	Senator	Party
1990
1990	1	Jocelyn Newman	Liberal
1990	2	Nick Sherry	Labor
1990	3	John Watson	Liberal
1990	4	John Devereux	Labor
1990	5	Paul Calvert	Liberal
1990	6	Robert Bell	Democrats
1987
1987	1	Michael Tate	Labor
1987	2	Brian Archer	Liberal
1987	3	Brian Harradine	Independent
1987	4	John Coates	Labor
1987	5	Shirley Walters	Liberal
1987	6	Terry Aulich	Labor

1990 Australian federal election: Senate, Tasmania
Party	Candidate	Votes	%	±%
Quota		41,614		
Liberal	1. Jocelyn Newman (elected 1); 2. John Watson (elected 3); 3. Paul Calvert (elected 5)	128,374	44.1	+5.4
Labor	1. Nick Sherry (elected 2); 2. John Devereux (elected 4); 3. Jacquie Murphy; 4. Sue Mackay	120,195	41.3	+0.5
Democrats	1. Robert Bell (elected 6); 2. Sarah Hancock	22,888	7.8	+1.1
United Tasmania	1. Michael Lynch; 2. Juliet Lavers; 3. Joan Staples; 4. Eva Ruzicka	14,160	4.9	+4.9
Democratic Socialist	1. Kath Gelber; 2. Scott Lewington	4,957	1.8	+1.8
Independent	John Gademski	718	0.3	+0.3
Total formal votes		291,292	96.9	+0.7
Informal votes		9,300	3.1	−0.7
Turnout		300,592	96.9	+0.5

== Australian Capital Territory ==
Elected	#	Senator	Party
1990
1990	1	Bob McMullan	Labor
1990	2	Margaret Reid	Liberal

1990 Australian federal election, Senate, Australian Capital Territory
Party	Candidate	Votes	%	±%
Quota		53,891		
Labor	Bob McMullan (elected 1)	66,495	41.1	−8.8
Liberal	1. Margaret Reid (elected 2); 2. Roger Dace	58,082	36.0	+2.0
Democrats	1. Norm Sanders; 2. Jenny McLeod	28,510	17.6	+7.4
Greens	1. Hedley Rowe; 2. Michael Poole	5,288	3.3	+3.3
Nuclear Disarmament	1. Michael Denborough; 2. Jan Grech	2,117	1.3	−3.8
Independent	Maggie Kennedy	769	0.5	+0.5
Independent	Max Minius	312	0.2	+0.2
Independent	Ralph Schroder	98	0.1	+0.1
Total formal votes		161,671	97.6	−0.1
Informal votes		3,905	2.4	+0.1
Turnout		165,576	96.2	+1.7

== Northern Territory ==
Elected	#	Senator	Party
1990
1990	1	Bob Collins	Labor
1990	2	Grant Tambling	CLP

1990 Australian federal election: Senate, Northern Territory
Party	Candidate	Votes	%	±%
Quota		22,908		
Labor	1. Bob Collins (elected 1); 2. Di Shanahan	37,343	54.3	+4.0
Country Liberal	1. Grant Tambling (elected 2); 2. Richard Lim	29,045	42.2	+9.7
Nuclear Disarmament	Citizen Limbo	1,197	1.7	+1.7
Independent	Ilana Eldridge	1,138	1.7	+1.7
Total formal votes		68,723	97.2	+0.9
Informal votes		1,977	2.8	−0.9
Turnout		70,700	89.5	+9.6

== See also ==
- 1990 Australian federal election
- Candidates of the Australian federal election, 1990
- Members of the Australian Senate, 1990–1993
