= Candidates of the 1990 Australian federal election =

This article provides information on candidates who stood for the 1990 Australian federal election. The election was held on 24 March 1990.

== Redistributions and seat changes ==
- A redistribution occurred in Victoria and Western Australia.
  - In Victoria, the Labor-held seats of Henty and Streeton were abolished. The notionally Labor seat of Corinella was created. The Liberal-held seat of Deakin became notionally Labor, and the Labor-held seat of Isaacs became notionally Liberal.
    - The member for Bruce, Ken Aldred (Liberal), contested Deakin.
    - The member for Deakin, Julian Beale (Liberal), contested Bruce.
    - The member for Hotham, Lewis Kent (Labor), contested Corinella.
    - The member for Streeton, Tony Lamb (Labor), contested Deakin.
  - In Western Australia, the notionally Liberal seat of Pearce was created. The Labor-held seat of Moore became notionally Liberal.
    - Western Australian Senator Fred Chaney (Liberal) contested Pearce.
- Queensland Senator John Stone (National) contested Fairfax.
- South Australian Senator Janine Haines (Democrats) contested Kingston.
- Tasmanian Senator Norm Sanders (Democrats) resigned from his Tasmanian seat to contest a Senate seat in the Australian Capital Territory.

== Retiring Members and Senators ==
=== Labor ===
- Lionel Bowen MP (Kingsford-Smith, NSW)
- John Brown MP (Parramatta, NSW)
- David Charles MP (Isaacs, Vic)
- Joan Child MP (Henty, Vic)
- Barry Cohen MP (Robertson, NSW)
- Manfred Cross MP (Brisbane, Qld)
- Dick Klugman MP (Prospect, NSW)
- John Mountford MP (Banks, NSW)
- Tom Uren MP (Reid, NSW)
- Senator Ray Devlin (Tas)
- Senator John Morris (NSW)

=== Liberal ===
- Ian Macphee MP (Goldstein, Vic)
- James Porter MP (Barker, SA)
- Roger Shipton MP (Higgins, Vic)
- Peter White MP (McPherson, Qld)
- Senator David Hamer (Vic)

=== National ===
- Evan Adermann MP (Fairfax, Qld)
- Ian Cameron MP (Maranoa, Qld)
- Bob Katter MP (Kennedy, Qld)
- Clarrie Millar MP (Wide Bay, Qld)

=== Democrats ===
- Senator Michael Macklin (Qld)

== House of Representatives ==
Sitting members at the time of the election are shown in bold text. Successful candidates are highlighted in the relevant colour. Where there is possible confusion, an asterisk (*) is also used.

=== Australian Capital Territory ===
Electorate	Held by	Labor candidate	Liberal candidate	Democrats candidate	NDP candidate	Greens candidate	Independent candidate
Canberra	Labor	**Ros Kelly**	Bill Mackey	Julie McCarron-Benson	Barbara Meyer	Gina Jeffrey	
Fraser	Labor	**John Langmore**	Sandie Brooke	Heather Jeffcoat	Gareth Smith	Sue Bolton	Emile Brunoro

=== New South Wales ===
Electorate	Held by	Labor candidate	Coalition candidate	Democrats candidate	Greens candidate	CTA candidate	Other candidates
Banks	Labor	Daryl Melham	Steve Pratt (Lib)	Paul Terrett		Ian Clipsham	John Hay (Ind); Brian Meyer (Ind); Graeme Robinson (DSP)
Barton	Labor	**Gary Punch**	David Macauley (Lib)	Ron George		Cathy Mudie	Joe Hardy (Ind); Max Lindon (Ind); Rosemary McCann (DSP); Noel Said (GP)
Bennelong	Liberal	Martin Claridge	**John Howard** (Lib)	Bob Springett		Robyn Peebles	John Dawson (Ind); Judy Messer (Ind); Hugh Pitty (NDP)
Berowra	Liberal	Sue Deane	**Harry Edwards** (Lib)	Martyn Yeomans		Beville Varidel	Mick Gallagher (Ind); Les Paul (Ind)
Blaxland	Labor	**Paul Keating**	David Voight (Lib)	Fiona Richardson			Mohamad Arja (Ind); Michael Irsak (CNA); Stephanie Miller (DSP)
Bradfield	Liberal	Adam McCarthy	**David Connolly** (Lib)	Henry Long			Anthony Hardwick (Ind); Alan Jacobs (Ind); Giovanna Trenoweth (NDP)
Calare	Labor	**David Simmons**	Joanne Lewis (Nat); John Loneregan (Lib)	Steve Adams			Brian Davis (Ind); Mike Phillips (Ind)
Charlton	Labor	**Bob Brown**	Mollie Blake (Lib)	Lyn Godfrey			Geoff Pendlebury (Ind)
Chifley	Labor	**Roger Price**	Darren Condon (Lib)	Nigel Lovell		Bill Bird	
Cook	Liberal	Paul Smith	**Don Dobie** (Lib)	Terri Richardson			Patricia Poulos (Ind); Dennis Ralph (Ind)
Cowper	National	John Murphy	**Garry Nehl** (Nat)	Trevor Pike	Angelique Meers		David Rees (Ind)
Cunningham	Labor	**Stewart West**	Jeff Thomson (Lib)	Meg Sampson	Steve Brigham		Rex Connor (RCL); Peter Symonds (Ind)
Dobell	Labor	**Michael Lee**	Ian Crook (Lib)	Rod Benninson	Karl Singman		Gordon Craig (Ind); Neville Malloy (GP)
Dundas	Liberal	Richard Talbot	**Philip Ruddock** (Lib)	Peter Reddy		Bruce Coleman	Barry Liggins (Ind); Alec Preda (Ind); John Wilson (Ind)
Eden-Monaro	Labor	**Jim Snow**	Rob Pollock (Lib); Gaye White (Nat)	Denise Redmond			Jim Collins (Ind); Greg Doyle (RCL)
Farrer	National	Bill Higgins	**Tim Fischer** (Nat)				
Fowler	Labor	**Ted Grace**	Gloria Arora (Lib)	Jon Phillips	Mirjana Ivetic-Elvy		Pam Branch (Ind); Rose-Mary Logozzo (Ind)
Gilmore	National	Mick Shea	**John Sharp** (Nat)	Susan Nagy			
Grayndler	Labor	**Leo McLeay**	Diana Bennett (Lib)	Peter Hennessy		Clay Wilson	Galeb Adra (Ind); Habib Fares (SPA); George der Mattosian (CNA); Lee Pepper (Ind); Paul Urban (Ind); Bruce Welch (Ind)
Greenway	Labor	**Russ Gorman**	Tony Packard (Lib)	Roger Posgate			Remi Biala (CNA); Ivor F (Ind); Gail Lord (DSP); Warren Wormald (Ind)
Gwydir	National	Ted Stubbins	**John Anderson** (Nat)	Anthony Styles			Bevan O'Regan (Ind)
Hughes	Labor	**Robert Tickner**	Cliff Mason (Lib)	John Clancy	George Kriflik		
Hume	Liberal	George Martin	**Wal Fife** (Lib)	Glenn Roberts			David Jones (Ind); Doug Kirkwood (Ind)
Hunter	Labor	**Eric Fitzgibbon**	Alison Davey (Nat); Ashley Saunders (Lib)	Chris Richards			
Kingsford-Smith	Labor	Laurie Brereton	Carol Dance (Lib)	Amelia Newman	Mark Berriman		Kaye Tucke (Ind)
Lindsay	Labor	**Ross Free**	Barry Haylock (Lib)	Paul Moritz		Brian Grigg	William Gayed (CNA); David Thomas (Ind)
Lowe	Liberal	Mary Easson	**Bob Woods** (Lib)	Andrew Mignot	Bruce Threlfo	Peter Peterson	Corrado Galimberti (Ind)
Lyne	National	Garry Worth	**Bruce Cowan** (Nat)	Peter Cooper			
Macarthur	Labor	**Stephen Martin**	Jim Cameron (Lib)	Peter Feltis	Chris Illert	Ken McDonald	Leon Bringolf (SPA)
Mackellar	Liberal	Adam Hatcher	**Jim Carlton** (Lib)	Jonathan King	Brad Hogarth	Muriel O'Neill	Maurice Foley (Ind)
Macquarie	Liberal	John Marsh	**Alasdair Webster** (Lib)	Bruce Forbes	Leslie Newton		John Baker (Ind); Stuart Douglass (Ind)
Mitchell	Liberal	Graeme McIlveen	**Alan Cadman** (Lib)	Jan Watts		Harold Morton	
Newcastle	Labor	**Allan Morris**	Mark Hallett (Lib)	Malcolm Martin			Frank Blefari (Ind); Col Forster (Ind); Leigh Maughan (Ind)
New England	National	Paul Brock	**Ian Sinclair** (Nat)	Steve Wood			Guy Wernhard (Ind); Peter Worthing (Ind)
North Sydney	Liberal	Chrissa Loukas	**John Spender** (Lib)	Graeme MacLennan			Ted Mack (Ind)
Page	National	Harry Woods	**Ian Robinson** (Nat)	Charles Lowe			Ivor Brown (Ind); Martin Frohlich (Ind); David Kitson (Ind)
Parkes	National	Ray Leslie	**Michael Cobb** (Nat)	Gloria Collison			
Parramatta	Labor	Paul Elliott	Ross Barwick (Lib)	Michael Antrum			Kerry Vernon (DSP)
Phillip	Labor	**Jeannette McHugh**	Charles Copeman (Lib)	Armon Hicks	David Barrington	Kevin Lohan	Toby Marshall (Ind); George Vlazny (GP); Cynthia Wrublewski (Ind)
Prospect	Labor	Janice Crosio	Paul Newton (Lib)	Kate Wright	Jenny Zanella		Nick Beams (Ind); Dick Nichols (DSP)
Reid	Labor	Laurie Ferguson	Lynne McDowell (Lib)	Steven Bailey		Keith Barron	Radwan Elachi (CNA); Margaret Gleeson (DSP); Vincent White (Ind)
Richmond	National	Neville Newell	**Charles Blunt** (Nat)	Stan Gibbs		Alan Sims	Gavin Baillie (Ind); Helen Caldicott (Ind); Dudley Leggett (Ind); Ian Paterson (Ind)
Riverina-Darling	National	Peter Black	**Noel Hicks** (Nat)				Gordon Dansie (Ind)
Robertson	Labor	Frank Walker	Paul St Clair (Lib)	Glenice Griffiths	Bryan Ellis		John Anderson (Ind); Paul Baker (Ind); Joyce Cook (GP); Martin Ritter (Ind)
Shortland	Labor	**Peter Morris**	Lynne Hall (Lib)	Michael Reckenberg			Mark Booth (Ind); Geoff Ellis (Ind); Clay Robinson (Ind); Lorraine Welsh (Ind)
St George	Labor	**Stephen Dubois**	Alan Smith (Lib)	John Mukai	Don Collingridge		John Brkich (CNA); Colin Hesse (DSP); Brian Howard (GP)
Sydney	Labor	**Peter Baldwin**	Stephen Woodhill (Lib)	Bob Dawson	Tony Harris	John Davern	Ken Henderson (Ind); Nadar Ponnuswamy (Ind)
Throsby	Labor	**Colin Hollis**	Garry Noel-Gough (Lib)	Greg Butler	Lyn Allison		Ronald Henderson (Ind); David Reilly (Ind)
Warringah	Liberal	David de Montfort	**Michael MacKellar** (Lib)	Marcus Weyland			
Wentworth	Liberal	Dimitri Tsingris	**John Hewson** (Lib)	Estelle Myers	Geoff Ash		James Reid (Ind)
Werriwa	Labor	**John Kerin**	Rick Lewis (Lib)	Eamon Quinn	Robert Tomasiello		Sue Dobson (EI)

=== Northern Territory ===
Electorate	Held by	Labor candidate	CLP candidate	Independent candidates
Northern Territory	Labor	**Warren Snowdon**	Helen Galton	Don Beaton; Tig Donnellan; Bob Liddle; Ron Sterry; Strider

=== Queensland ===
Electorate	Held by	Labor candidate	Liberal candidate	National candidates	Democrats candidate	Other candidates
Bowman	Labor	**Con Sciacca**	Peter Trounce	Stan Brimson	Phillip Grattan	
Brisbane	Labor	Arch Bevis	Keith Schafferius	Andrew Hassall	Leo Talty	Marylou Heath (Ind); William Kenney (Ind); Peter Simmons (DSP)
Capricornia	Labor	**Keith Wright**		Stan Collard		Craig Hardy (Grn)
Dawson	National	Greg McGarvie	Jim Seymour	**Ray Braithwaite**	Tom Irelandes	
Fadden	Liberal	Marie Wilkinson	**David Jull**	Peter Freckleton	Eugene Cross	Richard Heymann (Ind)
Fairfax	National	Beryl Muspratt	Alex Somlyay	John Stone	Bob Borsellino	Sheila Adams (ACP)
Fisher	Labor	**Michael Lavarch**	Tony Holmes	Brian Sheahan	Glen Spicer	
Forde	Labor	**Mary Crawford**	Brad Bauman	Ross Adams	Jason Neville	John Duggan (Ind); Coral Wynter (Grn)
Griffith	Labor	**Ben Humphreys**	Doug Edwards	Sean Cousins	Steven Lyndon	Russel Norman (DSP)
Groom	Liberal	Stewart Scott-Irving	**Bill Taylor**	Terry Day	Trevor Ives	
Herbert	Labor	**Ted Lindsay**	Peter Hazard	Rick Anderton	Colin Parker	
Hinkler	Labor	**Brian Courtice**	Frank Hibble	John Evans	Ronald Cullen	
Kennedy	National	Rob Hulls	Fred Tritton	Ross Shannon	Patricia Banzhaf	
Leichhardt	Labor	**John Gayler**	Bill Cummings	Kevin Byrne	Jim Downey	Jim Waldock (Ind)
Lilley	Labor	**Elaine Darling**	Ronald Nankervis	Steve Purtill	Elizabeth Rowland	Dave Riley (DSP)
Maranoa	National	John Adams	John Stone	Bruce Scott	Mary Hopkins	
McPherson	Liberal	Pat Stern	John Bradford	Randall Cook	Robert North	Bert Cockerill (Ind); Otto Kuhne (Ind)
Moncrieff	Liberal	Col Struthers	**Kathy Sullivan**	Peter Lyons	Jonathan Cornish	
Moreton	Liberal	Garrie Gibson	**Don Cameron**	Vince Cottrell	Ken Davies	
Oxley	Labor	**Les Scott**	David Cooke	Ray Wilms	Althea Rossmuller	
Petrie	Labor	**Gary Johns**	Bruce Flegg	Peter Bateman	Anthony Bloomer	Natasha Simons (DSP)
Rankin	Labor	**David Beddall**	John Miles	Huan Fraser	John Hoskins	Cheryl Crisp (Ind); Richard Whiteman (Ind)
Ryan	Liberal	Denny Campbell	**John Moore**	Helen McAllister	Adair Ferguson	Alan Skyring (Ind)
Wide Bay	National	Andrew Foley		Warren Truss	Bryan Sandall	John Szchech (Ind)

=== South Australia ===
Electorate	Held by	Labor candidate	Liberal candidate	Democrats candidate	CTA candidate	Other candidates
Adelaide	Liberal	Bob Catley	**Mike Pratt**	Peter Mann	Cathryn Linedale	Jean Booth (Ind); Keith Oehme (GA)
Barker	Liberal	Bill Hender	Ian McLachlan	Mark Lobban		Pieter Raams (Ind)
Bonython	Labor	**Neal Blewett**	Natalie Richardson	Colin Maas	Bruce Hannaford	
Boothby	Liberal	Michael Keenan	**Steele Hall**	Margaret-Ann Williams	Bruce Byrne	Colin Banks (Ind)
Grey	Labor	**Lloyd O'Neil**	Jonathan Man	Harm Folkers	Ern Heyne	Peter Clark (Ind); John Fisher (Ind)
Hawker	Labor	**Elizabeth Harvey**	Chris Gallus	Elizabeth Williams	Reg Macey	Glen Bottam (GP); Kathy Ragless (DSP)
Hindmarsh	Labor	**John Scott**	Barry Lewis	Stephen Crabbe	Peter Sparrow	Alan McCarthy (Ind); John Maguire (GP); David Moxham (Ind)
Kingston	Labor	**Gordon Bilney**	Judy Fuller	Janine Haines	Cliff Boyd	Tom Flanagan (DSP); George Gater (Ind); Lyall McDonald (Ind)
Makin	Labor	**Peter Duncan**	Daryl Hicks	Steve Bartholomew	Jeff Penny	David Howard (Ind); Geoff Roberts (Ind)
Mayo	Liberal	Delia Skorin	**Alexander Downer**	Merilyn Pedrick	John Watson	
Port Adelaide	Labor	**Rod Sawford**	Howard Trotter	Damien Aidon	Peter Thompson	Paul Petit (DSP)
Sturt	Liberal	Mark Hough	**Ian Wilson**	Arlyn Tombleson	Tom Curnow	Elena Bulis (GP)
Wakefield	Liberal	George Karzis	**Neil Andrew**	Kaye Matthews	Ashley Grace	

=== Tasmania ===
Electorate	Held by	Labor candidate	Liberal candidate	Democrats candidate	Other candidates
Bass	Liberal	Silvia Smith	**Warwick Smith**	Rae Saxon	John Chester (UTG)
Braddon	Liberal	Terry Hynes	**Chris Miles**	James Reilly	Tom Egglestone (Ind)
Denison	Labor	**Duncan Kerr**	Michael Hodgman	Rob Alliston	Ian Hopkins (DSP); Graeme Jones (Ind); Geoff Law (UTG)
Franklin	Liberal	Eugene Alexander	**Bruce Goodluck**	Patsy Harmsen	
Lyons	Liberal	Bob Gordon	**Max Burr**	Mike Hancock	

=== Victoria ===
Electorate	Held by	Labor candidate	Coalition candidate	Democrats candidate	CTA candidate	Other candidates
Aston	Labor	**John Saunderson**	Peter Nugent (Lib)	Damian Wise	Michael Ryan	
Ballarat	Labor	**John Mildren**	Michael Ronaldson (Lib)	Bill Scetrine	Jodie Rickard	George Helon (Ind); Greg Mays (Ind)
Batman	Labor	**Brian Howe**	Ray Ellis (Lib)	George Gogas	Alan Watts	Nigel D'Souza (DSP)
Bendigo	Labor	**John Brumby**	Denis English (Nat); Bruce Reid* (Lib)	Ian Keeling	Vic Upson	Joan Ansell (Ind); Russell Castley (Ind)
Bruce	Liberal	Philip Cottier	**Julian Beale** (Lib)	Geoff Herbert	Peter Olney	
Burke	Labor	**Neil O'Keefe**	Ian Lindsay (Lib)	Patrick McCurry		
Calwell	Labor	**Andrew Theophanous**	Dianne Livett (Lib)	Doug Lorman	Rob Lukanic	Jack Culpin (Ind)
Casey	Liberal	Jon Linehan	**Bob Halverson** (Lib)	Paul Rees	John Dubbeld	Earle Keegel (Ind); Basil Smith (Ind)
Chisholm	Liberal	Helen Mayer	**Michael Wooldridge** (Lib)	Trudi Brunton	Adrian Stagg	
Corangamite	Liberal	Ian Caldwell	**Stewart McArthur** (Lib)	Rob Mann	John Andrews	Bruce Wilson (Ind)
Corinella	Labor	**Lewis Kent**	Russell Broadbent (Lib)	Mike Burns		George Moran (CEC)
Corio	Labor	**Gordon Scholes**	Adrienne Edgar (Lib)	Donal Storey	Ian Winter	Horst Pfeifer (Ind); Bruce Tanner (Ind)
Deakin	Labor	**Tony Lamb**	**Ken Aldred** (Lib)	Louise Enders	Rodger Nardi	Bronwen Beechey (DSP)
Dunkley	Labor	**Bob Chynoweth**	Frank Ford (Lib)	Peter Lindemann	Arthur Comer	Len Cosmavich (Ind); Keith Edwards (PPA); Peter Seitanidis (Ind); Mike Toldy (Ind)
Flinders	Liberal	Tony Moore	**Peter Reith** (Lib)	Nance Jaboor		David Gilbert (Ind)
Gellibrand	Labor	**Ralph Willis**	Tim Warner (Lib)	Frank Fichera		Richard Phillips (Ind); Don Veitch (Ind); Gary Walters (DSP)
Gippsland	National	Merv Bundle	**Peter McGauran** (Nat)	Grace McCaughey	Robert Watson	Ben Buckley (Ind)
Goldstein	Liberal	Michael Danby	David Kemp (Lib)	Di Bretherton	Phillip McGibbony	Adrienne Barrett (DSP); John Casley (Ind); Peter Kormoczy (Ind); Diana Wolowski (Ind)
Higgins	Liberal	Laurie Walsh	Peter Costello (Lib)	Clive Jackson	Neil Baluch	
Holt	Labor	**Michael Duffy**	Mario Dodic (Lib)	Irmgard Westphal	Lynne Dickson	
Hotham	Labor	Simon Crean	Erdem Aydin (Lib)	Phillip Anderson	Daryl Esmore	Vincent Alfonso (Ind); Peter Stamatopoulos (SPA)
Indi	Liberal	John Dennis	**Ewen Cameron** (Lib)	Ian Deegan		Barry Tattersall (Ind)
Isaacs	Liberal	Jim Ensor	Rod Atkinson (Lib)	Darren Koch		
Jagajaga	Labor	**Peter Staples**	Fred Garrett (Lib)	Howard McCallum	Colin Arnold	Robert Morris (Ind)
Kooyong	Liberal	Eugene O'Sullivan	**Andrew Peacock** (Lib)	Jill Leisegang		Arthur Burns (AAFI); Tim Ferguson (Ind); David Greagg (Ind)
Lalor	Labor	**Barry Jones**	Rae Medlock (Lib)	George Demetriou	Ron Moffett	Peter Ryan (Ind)
La Trobe	Labor	**Peter Milton**	Bob Charles (Lib)	Greta Jungwirth	Teresa Kemp	
Mallee	National	Peter Mitchell	**Peter Fisher** (Nat)	Ian McCracken		
Maribyrnong	Labor	**Alan Griffiths**	Victor Rudewych (Lib)	Frances McKay		
McEwen	Labor	**Peter Cleeland**	Fran Bailey (Lib)	Russell Dawes	Win Wise	Maurie Smith (Ind)
McMillan	Labor	**Barry Cunningham**	Jillian Petersen (Nat); John Riggall* (Lib)	Ross Ollquist	Michael Slaughter	Glen Mann (Ind)
Melbourne	Labor	**Gerry Hand**	Rodger Gully (Lib)	Geoff Mosley		Jim Ferrari (Ind); Steve Florin (Ind); Melanie Sjoberg (DSP)
Melbourne Ports	Labor	**Clyde Holding**	Allan Paull (Lib)	David Collyer		Greg Loats (DSP)
Menzies	Liberal	Ivana Csar	**Neil Brown** (Lib)	Elizabeth Piper-Johnson	Ron Suter	
Murray	National	Frank Purcell	**Bruce Lloyd** (Nat)	Barbara Leavesley		Anne Adams (Ind)
Scullin	Labor	**Harry Jenkins**	Wayne Phillips (Lib)	Malcolm Brown		Angelo Iacono (Ind); Steve Pollock (Ind)
Wannon	Liberal	Phillip Sawyer	**David Hawker** (Lib)	Allan Thompson	Terry Winter	
Wills	Labor	**Bob Hawke**	John Delacretaz (Lib)	Philip Mendes		Marc Aussie-Stone (Ind); Mark Beshara (DLP); Lali Chelliah (DSP); Cecil G. Murgatroyd (Ind); Ian Sykes (Ind)

=== Western Australia ===
Electorate	Held by	Labor candidate	Liberal candidate	Democrats candidate	Greens candidate	National candidate	Other candidate
Brand	Labor	**Wendy Fatin**	Maureen Healy	Jan Wallace	Luna Gardiner	Errol Tuxworth	Keith Evans (Ind); Clive Galletly (Ind); Blanche Pledge (GP)
Canning	Labor	**George Gear**	Ricky Johnston	Don Bryant	Neil Roper		Bill Higgins (PPA); Phil Hooper (Ind); Carol Oats (Ind); Arthur Robertson (GP); Geoff Spencer (DSP)
Cowan	Labor	**Carolyn Jakobsen**	Diane Airey	Sarah Gilfillan	Sally Ward		Brian Guinan (ACP); Robert McLoughlin (Ind); Barry Smith (GP); Deb Thomas (DSP)
Curtin	Liberal	Stephen Booth	**Allan Rocher**	Helen Hodgson	Mary Salter		Michelle Hovane (DSP); Brett Woodhill (GP)
Forrest	Liberal	Simon Keely	**Geoff Prosser**	David Churches	Giz Watson	Rick Beatty	
Fremantle	Labor	**John Dawkins**	Paul Stevenage	Ray Tilbury	Jennie Cary		Ian Bolas (Ind); Ronnie Riley (GP)
Kalgoorlie	Labor	**Graeme Campbell**	Louie Carnicelli	Vin Cooper	Robin Chapple	Dascia Weckert	Josh Sacino (GP)
Moore	Liberal	**Allen Blanchard**	Paul Filing	Alan Lloyd	Brian Steels		Mark Watson (GP)
O'Connor	Liberal	Kim Chance	**Wilson Tuckey**	Huw Grossmith	Jim Cavill	James Ferguson	Rick Finney (GP)
Pearce	Liberal	John Duncan	Fred Chaney	Peter Lambert	Greg Bankoff		Gina Pintabona (GP)
Perth	Labor	**Ric Charlesworth**	Marylyn Rodgers	Brian Jenkins	Brenda Conochie	William Witham	Richard Cheuk (DSP); Don Gudgeon (GP)
Stirling	Labor	**Ron Edwards**	Jock Barker	Lachlan Irvine	Kim Herbert		Eugene Hands (GP); Barry Shardlow (Ind); Jonathan Strauss (DSP)
Swan	Labor	**Kim Beazley**	Peter Kirwan	Alan Needham	Dee Margetts		Paul Auguston (Ind); Patrick Donovan (Ind); Erica Gamble (Ind); Mike Hutton (GP); Frank Noakes (DSP)
Tangney	Liberal	Chris Keely	**Peter Shack**	Hannah Wolfe	Mark Schneider		Andrew Wade (GP)

== Senate ==
Sitting Senators are shown in bold text. Tickets that elected at least one Senator are highlighted in the relevant colour. Successful candidates are identified by an asterisk (*).

=== Australian Capital Territory ===
Two seats were up for election. The Labor Party was defending one seat. The Liberal Party was defending one seat.

Labor candidates	Liberal candidates	Democrats candidates	Greens candidates	NDP candidates	Ungrouped candidates
1. **Bob McMullan***	1. **Margaret Reid***; 2. Roger Dace	1. Norm Sanders; 2. Jenny McLeod	1. Hedley Rowe; 2. Michael Poole	1. Michael Denborough; 2. Jan Grech	Max Minius; Ralph Schroder; Maggie Kennedy

=== New South Wales ===
Six seats were up for election. The Labor Party was defending two seats. The Liberal-National Coalition was defending three seats. The Nuclear Disarmament Party was defending one seat (although Senator Irina Dunn contested the election as an independent). Senators Michael Baume (Liberal), Peter Baume (Liberal), John Faulkner (Labor), Paul McLean (Democrats), Graham Richardson (Labor) and Kerry Sibraa (Labor) were not up for re-election.

Labor candidates	Coalition candidates	Democrats candidates	Green Alliance candidates	NDP candidates	CTA candidates
1. Stephen Loosley*; 2. **Bruce Childs***; 3. Sue West*; 4. John McCarthy	1. **Bronwyn Bishop*** (Lib); 2. **David Brownhill*** (Nat); 3. **Chris Puplick** (Lib); 4. Geoffrey Anderson (Lib)	1. Vicki Bourne*; 2. Karin Sowada; 3. William Cole; 4. Dorothy Thompson	1. Ian Cohen; 2. Christopher Kirkbright; 3. Sue Arnold; 4. Jo Faith; 5. Jane Beckmann	1. Robert Wood; 2. Samantha Trenoweth	1. Kevin Hume; 2. John Everingham
EFF candidates	New Australia candidates	Grey Power candidates	Green Party candidates	Enviro. Inds candidates	CEC candidates
1. George Turner; 2. Alan Gourley; 3. Bill Garing; 4. Jim Shanks; 5. Dallas Clarnette; 6. June Smith	1. Oscar Landicho; 2. Onsy Mattar; 3. Len Hajjar; 4. Sam Ressitis; 5. Reginaldo Conti; 6. Warren Rogan	1. Robert Clark; 2. Theo Hetterscheid; 3. Walter Radimey	1. Daniela Reverberi; 2. Jenys Newton	1. **Irina Dunn**; 2. Peter Prineas; 3. Harry Recher	1. Lex Stewart; 2. Leone Hay; 3. John Doran
Group C candidates	Group D candidates	Group L candidates	Ungrouped candidates		
1. Ian Murphy; 2. Anne Murphy	1. Alan Wilkinson; 2. Andrew MacGregor	1. Colin Wilson; 2. Glenn Wilson	Lord Rolo; Evalds Erglis; Zero-Population Growth; Bob Sutherland	John Henshaw; Abraham Lincoln; Harry Hnoudakis; Ian Monk	Peter Consandine; Gene Pierson-Salvestrin; Reen Dixon; Bill Smith

=== Northern Territory ===
Two seats were up for election. The Labor Party was defending one seat. The Country Liberal Party was defending one seat.

Labor candidates	CLP candidates	Ungrouped candidates
1. **Bob Collins***; 2. Di Shanahan	1. **Grant Tambling***; 2. Richard Lim	Ilana Eldridge (Ind); Citizen Limbo (NDP)

=== Queensland ===
Six seats were up for election. The Labor Party was defending three seats. The National Party was defending two seats. The Australian Democrats were defending one seat. Senators Florence Bjelke-Petersen (National), Mal Colston (Labor), David MacGibbon (Liberal), Warwick Parer (Liberal) and Margaret Reynolds (Labor) were not up for re-election. The seat held by Senator John Stone (National) was also not up for re-election but was vacant due to his resignation to contest the House of Representatives; this seat would be filled in May by Bill O'Chee.

Labor candidates	Liberal candidates	National candidates	Democrats candidates	CTA candidates	DSP candidates
1. **Gerry Jones***; 2. **Bryant Burns***; 3. **John Black**; 4. Greg Vicary	1. Ian Macdonald*; 2. John Herron*; 3. Carmel Draper	1. **Ron Boswell***; 2. **Glen Sheil**; 3. Beth Honeycombe; 4. Jim Mason	1. Cheryl Kernot*; 2. Tony Walters; 3. Brian Stockwell; 4. John Brown	1. Rona Joyner; 2. Wilfred Blake; 3. Bernice King; 4. Ross Maclean	1. Maurice Sibelle; 2. Karen Fletcher
Enviro. Inds candidates	Conservative candidates	Grey Power candidates	Group F candidates	Ungrouped candidates	
1. Peter James; 2. John Jones	1. Sydney Volker; 2. Loraine Morrison	1. Ron Alford; 2. Felix Cernovs	1. Barry Weedon; 2. Margaret Crompton	Vincent Burke; Steve Dimitriou; Mark Cresswell; Clemens Vermeulen	

=== South Australia ===
Six seats were up for election. The Labor Party was defending two seats. The Liberal Party was defending three seats. The Australian Democrats were defending one seat. Senators Nick Bolkus (Labor), Dominic Foreman (Labor), Graham Maguire (Labor), Tony Messner (Liberal) and Amanda Vanstone (Liberal) were not up for re-election. The seat held by Senator Janine Haines (Democrats) was also not up for re-election, but was vacant due to her resignation to contest the House of Representatives; it was filled in April by Meg Lees.

Labor candidates	Liberal candidates	Democrats candidates	Green Party candidates	National candidates	CTA candidates
1. **Rosemary Crowley***; 2. **Chris Schacht***; 3. Gay Thompson; 4. Jim Hyde	1. **Robert Hill***; 2. **Baden Teague***; 3. **Grant Chapman***; 4. Ivan Venning	1. **John Coulter***; 2. Graham Pamount; 3. Judy Smith; 4. Pat Macaskill	1. Deborah White; 2. Philippa Skinner; 3. Colin Hunt	1. Neville Agars; 2. Gary Hamdorf	1. David Squirrell; 2. Colin Sinclair
Group B candidates	Group F candidates	Ungrouped candidates			
1. Tania Mykyta; 2. Lizz Higgins	1. F. Rieck; 2. Heather Shephard	Anastasios Giannouklas; Jack Holder (GP); Jack King			

=== Tasmania ===
Six seats were up for election. The Labor Party was defending two seats. The Liberal Party was defending three seats. The Australian Democrats were defending one seat. Senators Brian Archer (Liberal), Terry Aulich (Labor), John Coates (Labor), Brian Harradine (Independent), Michael Tate (Labor) and Shirley Walters (Liberal) were not up for re-election.

Labor candidates	Liberal candidates	Democrats candidates	UTG candidates	DSP candidates	Ungrouped candidates
1. Nick Sherry*; 2. **John Devereux***; 3. Jacquie Murphy; 4. Sue Mackay	1. **Jocelyn Newman***; 2. **John Watson***; 3. **Paul Calvert***	1. **Robert Bell***; 2. Sarah Hancock	1. Michael Lynch; 2. Juliet Lavers; 3. Joan Staples; 4. Eva Ruzicka	1. Kath Gelber; 2. Scott Lewington	John Gademski

=== Victoria ===
Six seats were up for election. The Labor Party was defending two seats. The Liberal-National Coalition was defending four seats. Senators John Button (Labor), Gareth Evans (Labor), Austin Lewis (Liberal), Janet Powell (Democrats), Jim Short (Liberal) and Olive Zakharov (Labor) were not up for re-election.

Labor candidates	Coalition candidates	Democrats candidates	Greens candidates	CTA candidates	DLP candidates
1. **Robert Ray***; 2. **Barney Cooney***; 3. Kim Carr; 4. Carole Marple; 5. Roger Lowrey	1. **Richard Alston*** (Lib); 2. **Kay Patterson*** (Lib); 3. Rod Kemp* (Lib); 4. **Julian McGauran** (Nat); 5. Peter Coatman (Lib); 6. Severn Clarke (Lib)	1. Sid Spindler*; 2. Jill O'Brien; 3. Hans Paas; 4. Christine Craik	1. Ken McGregor; 2. Alf Bamblett; 3. Pauline Scott	1. Al Watson; 2. George Khoury	1. Robert Semmel; 2. Jean Taylor
AAFI candidates	Pensioner candidates	Enviro. Inds candidates	Group F candidates	Ungrouped candidates	
1. Denis McCormack; 2. Robyn Spencer	1. Neil McKay; 2. Fred Grant	1. Gordon McQuilten; 2. Claire McLeod	1. Peter Robinson; 2. John Giltinan	Chris Vassis; Edward Fraser; Joe Toscano; Don Meggs	Deborah Goudappel; James Bernard; Athol Guy; Mabel Cardinal

=== Western Australia ===
Six seats were up for election. The Labor Party was defending two seats. The Liberal Party was defending two seats. The Australian Democrats were defending one seat. Senator Jo Vallentine, elected as an independent, was contesting the election for the Greens Western Australia. Senators Fred Chaney (Liberal), Peter Cook (Labor), Peter Durack (Liberal), Patricia Giles (Labor), Sue Knowles (Liberal) and Peter Walsh (Labor) were not up for re-election.

Labor candidates	Liberal candidates	Democrats candidates	Greens WA candidates	National candidates	DSP candidates
1. **Jim McKiernan***; 2. **Michael Beahan***; 3. Mark Bishop; 4. John Cowdell	1. **Noel Crichton-Browne***; 2. **John Panizza***; 3. Winston Crane*; 4. Bernie Masters	1. **Jean Jenkins**; 2. Richard Jeffreys; 3. Barbara Churchward	1. **Jo Vallentine***; 2. Christabel Bridge; 3. Gladys Yarran	1. Michael Jardine; 2. Brian English; 3. Josephine Walton	1. Catherine Brown; 2. Kylie Budge
Conservative candidates	Grey Power candidates	Pensioner candidates	Ungrouped candidates		
1. Brady Williams; 2. Charles Bussell; 3. Laurence Molloy	1. Doug Ratcliffe; 2. Jack Webb	1. Maureen Grierson; 2. Gordon Munn	Mitchell Faircloth; Ted Quinlan; Barbara Stark; Philip Achurch		

== Summary by party ==
Beside each party is the number of seats contested by that party in the House of Representatives for each state, as well as an indication of whether the party contested the Senate election in the respective state.

Party	NSW		Vic		Qld		WA		SA		Tas		ACT		NT		Total	
Party	HR	S	HR	S	HR	S	HR	S	HR	S	HR	S	HR	S	HR	S	HR	S
Australian Labor Party	51	*	38	*	24	*	14	*	13	*	5	*	2	*	1	*	148	8
Liberal Party of Australia	41	*	35	*	22	*	14	*	13	*	5	*	2	*			132	7
National Party of Australia	13	*	4	*	24	*	5	*		*							46	5
Country Liberal Party															1	*	1	1
Australian Democrats	49	*	38	*	24	*	14	*	13	*	5	*	2	*			145	7
Call to Australia	16	*	24	*		*			12	*							52	4
Democratic Socialist Party	8		7		4	*	5	*	3		1	*					28	3
Grey Power	5	*				*	12	*	3	*							20	5
Green Alliance	18^{1}	*							1	*							19	2
Greens Western Australia							14	*									14	1
Combined New Australia Party	6	*															6	1
Nuclear Disarmament Party	2	*											2	*		*	4	3
Socialist Party of Australia	2		1														3	
Australian Conservative Party					1	*	1	*									2	2
Pensioner Party of Australia			1	*			1	*									2	2
United Tasmania Group											2	*					2	1
ACT Green Democratic Alliance													2	*			2	1
Rex Connor Labor Party	2																2	
Queensland Greens					2												2	
Irina Dunn's Environment Independents	1	*		*		*											1	3
Citizens Electoral Council		*	1														1	1
Australians Against Further Immigration			1	*													1	1
Democratic Labor Party			1	*													1	1
Independent EFF		*																1
New South Wales Green Party		*																1
Independent and other	69		36		11		12		11		2		1		5		147	

^{1}Contested as a group of affiliated parties registered under the names Central Coast Green Party (2 candidates), Cowper Greens (1 candidate), Eastern Suburbs Greens (3 candidates), Greens in Lowe (1 candidate), Illawarra Greens (2 candidates), South Sydney Greens (3 candidates), Sydney Greens (1 candidate) and Western Suburbs Greens (5 candidates), with the Green Alliance Senate - New South Wales as the registered Senate name.

== See also ==
- 1990 Australian federal election
- Members of the Australian House of Representatives, 1987–1990
- Members of the Australian House of Representatives, 1990–1993
- Members of the Australian Senate, 1987–1990
- Members of the Australian Senate, 1990–1993
- List of political parties in Australia
