= Members of the Australian Senate, 1990–1993 =

Senate composition at 1 July 1990
Government (32)
Labor (32) – (7 seat minority)

Opposition (34)
Coalition
Liberal (28)
National Party (5)
Country Liberal (1)

Crossbench (10)
Democrats (8) (Note: Janet Powell was elected as an Australian Democrats member, but resigned in July 1992 and served out the remainder of her term as an independent.)
WA Greens (1)
Independent (1)

Changes in composition

This is a list of members of the Australian Senate from 1990 to 1993. Half of the state senators had been allocated a long term following the double dissolution election in 1987 and had terms due to finish on 30 June 1993; the other half of the state senators were elected at the March 1990 election and had terms due to finish on 30 June 1996. The territory senators were elected at the March 1990 election and their terms ended at the next federal election, which was March 1993.

The composition of the Senate was affected by the decision in 1987 as to which senators received a long term, with Labor and the Democrats voting to reject the alternate "recount" method that had been unanimously recommended by the Joint Select Committee on Electoral Reform in 1983, and facilitated by the Commonwealth Electoral Act. Thus the Labor government, with only 32 seats, needed 7 additional votes to achieve the majority necessary to pass legislation. Because the Democrats had got 2 additional long vacancies in 1987, in South Australia and New South Wales, the Democrats had a total of 8 seats from 1990 and thus continued to hold the balance of power, even after Janet Powell resigned from the Democrats in 1992.

Senator	Party	State	Term ending	Years in office
Richard Alston	Liberal	Victoria	1996	1986–2004
Brian Archer	Liberal	Tasmania	1993	1975–1994
Terry Aulich	Labor	Tasmania	1993	1984–1993
Michael Baume	Liberal	New South Wales	1993	1984–1996
Peter Baume (Note: New South Wales Liberal Senator Peter Baume resigned on 28 January 1991. John Tierney was appointed as his replacement on the same day.)	Liberal	New South Wales	1993	1974–1991
Michael Beahan	Labor	Western Australia	1996	1987–1996
Robert Bell	Democrats	Tasmania	1996	1990–1996
Bronwyn Bishop	Liberal	New South Wales	1996	1987–1994
Florence Bjelke-Petersen	National	Queensland	1993	1980–1993
Nick Bolkus	Labor	South Australia	1993	1981–2005
Ron Boswell	National	Queensland	1996	1983–2014
Vicki Bourne	Democrats	New South Wales	1996	1990–2002
David Brownhill	National	New South Wales	1996	1984–2000
Bryant Burns	Labor	Queensland	1996	1987–1996
John Button (Note: Victorian Labor Senator John Button resigned on 31 March 1993. Kim Carr was appointed as his replacement on 28 April.)	Labor	Victoria	1993	1974–1993
Paul Calvert	Liberal	Tasmania	1996	1987–2007
Ian Campbell	Liberal	Western Australia	1993	1990–2007
Kim Carr	Labor	Victoria	1993	1993–2022
Christabel Chamarette (Note: Western Australian Green Senator Jo Vallentine resigned on 31 January 1992. Christabel Chamarette was appointed as her replacement on 12 March.)	WA Greens	Western Australia	1996	1992–1996
Grant Chapman	Liberal	South Australia	1996	1987–2008
Bruce Childs	Labor	New South Wales	1996	1980–1997
John Coates	Labor	Tasmania	1993	1980–1996
Bob Collins	Labor	Northern Territory	1993, 1996 (Note: The term of a territory senator ends at the dissolution of the House of Representatives, which was March 1993.)	1987–1998
Mal Colston	Labor	Queensland	1993	1975–1999
Peter Cook	Labor	Western Australia	1993	1983–2005
Barney Cooney	Labor	Victoria	1996	1984–2002
John Coulter	Democrats	South Australia	1996	1987–1995
Winston Crane	Liberal	Western Australia	1996	1990–2002
Noel Crichton-Browne	Liberal	Western Australia	1996	1980–1996
Rosemary Crowley	Labor	South Australia	1996	1983–2002
John Devereux	Labor	Tasmania	1996	1987–1996
Peter Durack (Note: Father of the Senate)	Liberal	Western Australia	1993	1970–1993
Gareth Evans	Labor	Victoria	1993	1977–1996
John Faulkner	Labor	New South Wales	1993	1989–2015
Alan Ferguson (Note: South Australian Liberal Senator John Olsen resigned on 4 May 1992. Alan Ferguson was appointed as his replacement on 26 May.)	Liberal	South Australia	1993	1992–2011
Dominic Foreman	Labor	South Australia	1993	1980–1997
Patricia Giles	Labor	Western Australia	1993	1980–1993
Brian Harradine	Independent	Tasmania	1993	1975–2005
John Herron	Liberal	Queensland	1996	1990–2002
Robert Hill	Liberal	South Australia	1996	1981–2006
Gerry Jones	Labor	Queensland	1996	1980–1996
Rod Kemp	Liberal	Victoria	1996	1990–2008
Cheryl Kernot	Democrats	Queensland	1996	1990–1997
Sue Knowles	Liberal	Western Australia	1993	1984–2005
Meg Lees	Democrats	South Australia	1993	1990–2005
Austin Lewis	Liberal	Victoria	1993	1976–1993
Stephen Loosley	Labor	New South Wales	1996	1990–1995
Ian Macdonald	Liberal	Queensland	1996	1990–2019
David MacGibbon	Liberal	Queensland	1993	1977–1999
Graham Maguire	Labor	South Australia	1993	1983–1993
Jim McKiernan	Labor	Western Australia	1996	1984–2002
Paul McLean (Note: New South Wales Democrat Senator Paul McLean resigned on 23 August 1991. Karin Sowada was appointed as his replacement on 29 August.)	Democrats	New South Wales	1993	1987–1991
Bob McMullan	Labor	Australian Capital Territory	1993, 1996	1988–1996
Jocelyn Newman	Liberal	Tasmania	1996	1986–2002
Bill O'Chee	National	Queensland	1993	1990–1999
John Olsen	Liberal	South Australia	1993	1990–1992
John Panizza	Liberal	Western Australia	1996	1987–1997
Warwick Parer	Liberal	Queensland	1993	1984–2000
Kay Patterson	Liberal	Victoria	1996	1987–2008
Janet Powell	Democrats/Ind (Note: Victorian Senator Janet Powell resigned from the Australian Democrats on 31 July 1992. She served out the remainder of her term as an independent.)	Victoria	1993	1986–1993
Robert Ray	Labor	Victoria	1996	1981–2008
Margaret Reid	Liberal	Australian Capital Territory	1993, 1996	1981–2003
Margaret Reynolds	Labor	Queensland	1993	1983–1999
Graham Richardson	Labor	New South Wales	1993	1983–1994
Chris Schacht	Labor	South Australia	1996	1987–2002
Nick Sherry	Labor	Tasmania	1996	1990–2012
Jim Short	Liberal	Victoria	1993	1984–1997
Kerry Sibraa	Labor	New South Wales	1993	1975–1978, 1978–1994
Karin Sowada	Democrats	New South Wales	1993	1991–1993
Sid Spindler	Democrats	Victoria	1996	1990–1996
Grant Tambling	Country Liberal	Northern Territory	1993, 1996	1987–2001
Michael Tate	Labor	Tasmania	1993	1977–1993
Baden Teague	Liberal	South Australia	1996	1977–1996
John Tierney	Liberal	New South Wales	1993	1991–2005
Jo Vallentine	WA Greens	Western Australia	1996	1984–1992
Amanda Vanstone	Liberal	South Australia	1993	1984–2007
Peter Walsh	Labor	Western Australia	1993	1974–1993
Shirley Walters	Liberal	Tasmania	1993	1975–1993
John Watson	Liberal	Tasmania	1996	1978–2008
Sue West	Labor	New South Wales	1996	1987, 1990–2002
Olive Zakharov	Labor	Victoria	1993	1983–1995
