= George Helon =

Author and historian (born 1965)

George William Helon
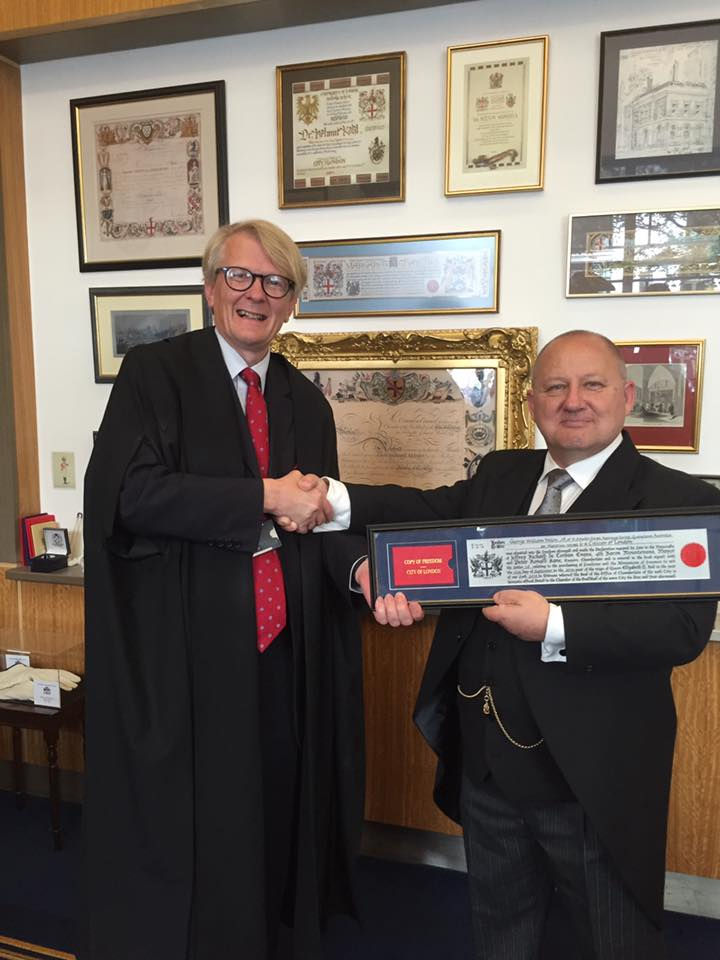
- Helon (right) at Freedom of the City of London Ceremony on 12 September 2016.
- Born: 1965 (age 60–61); Bridgnorth, England
- Occupations: Author; Businessman; Historian; Theologian; Ethnographer
- Notable work: Aboriginal Australia; The English-Gooreng/Gooreng English Dictionary; First Names of the Polish Commonwealth
- Website: georgehelon.com

George Helon (born 1965), also known under the pen names George Wieslaw Helon and Jerzy Wieslaw Helon, is an Australian author, businessman, and historian and advocate for unpaid carers.

He has written numerous ethnographic and etymological books, including Aboriginal Australia, The English-Gooreng/Gooreng-English Dictionary, and First Names of the Polish Commonwealth (which he co-authored with William F. Hoffman). He is also the founder and CEO of MedicReady, an international award winning company in Australia that produces accident and emergency medical data first response kits and cards.

== Early life and education ==
George William Helon was born Wieslaw George Helon in 1965 in Bridgnorth, Shropshire, England. His family has noble Polish ancestry, and Helon is a hereditary Count and nobleman of the Polish Kingdom and Polish-Lithuanian Commonwealth. He was born with a rare autosomal genetic disorder known as Pallister–Hall syndrome, the symptoms of which (including a rare pituitary tumour and gelastic seizures) he has experienced for his entire life.

His father, Zbigniew "Alan" Helon, was deported to a Gulag forced labor camp in Mucznaja, Archangelsk, Siberia with his family as a toddler in 1940. Zbigniew eventually emigrated to the United Kingdom where he met his future wife (and George's mother) Elzbieta (Elizabeth) Misiura. In 1970, the family left Wolverhampton to move to Melbourne where Zbigniew had been offered an engineering job at B.S.P. Planning & Design. George Helon attended St Patrick's College in Ballarat, Victoria between 1980 and 1982.

== Life and career ==
Helon published several books of poetry and prose in 1984, including Book of Love and Destruction, Scattered Thoughts, and All for Dreamers. In the 1990 Australian federal election, Helon ran as an independent candidate for the Australian House of Representatives seat in the Division of Ballarat, losing to the Liberal Party of Australia candidate, Michael Ronaldson. In 1992, he moved to Bundaberg, Queensland with his family. In 1994, Helon's The English-Gooreng/Gooreng-English Dictionary was published. In October, the Gooreng Gooreng tribe honored Helon with the tribal name of Buralnyarla (White Owl). In December of that year, the dictionary was presented to the Australian Parliament's House of Representatives by the Federal Member for the Division of Hinkler, Paul Neville, who publicly acknowledged Helon's work

In 1997, Helon was a candidate for the Constitutional Monarchists in the Australian Constitutional Convention Election. By that time, he had also been registered as a Justice of the Peace (qualified) in Queensland. In 1998, Helon published 3 books: The Gooreng Gooreng Tribe of South-east Queensland, Aboriginal Australia, and First Names of the Polish Commonwealth. In 2001, Helon was hospitalized for 12 days with gelastic seizures and an inoperable 4.5-centimeter brain tumor associated with his Pallister-Hall syndrome. He moved with his family to Toowoomba in 2002 to be closer to medical specialists.

A hereditary Count and nobleman of the Polish Kingdom and Polish–Lithuanian Commonwealth, Helon was appointed as the Australian representative of the Polish Nobility Association Foundation in 2005. By 2008, he held titles such as the Marquis de Helon, Knight Commander (KCSG) of the Pontifical Equestrian Order of St. Gregory the Great, Knight of the Grand Cross of the Order of the Eagle of Georgia and the Seamless Tunic of Our Lord Jesus Christ, Grand Officer of the Vietnamese Imperial Order of the Dragon of Annam, and the Grand Cross of the Imperial Ethiopian Order of Saint Mary of Zion. Between 2012 and 2013, Helon served on the Toowoomba Regional Access and Disability Advisory Committee. In 2014, the Helon Theological Reference Library (a private theological and biblical library Helon founded) began displaying a 1:3 reproduction of the Ark of the Covenant.

On 8 May 2016, he founded MedicReady®, a company in Australia that produces accident and emergency medical data first response kits and cards that contain information about a patient's medical history. In 2018, he was named to The Toowoomba Chronicle's "Power 100" list.

== Activism ==
Helon has been a prominent constitutional monarchist. In 1995, he lodged a formal complaint with the Australian Federal Police, requesting an investigation into whether Prime Minister Paul Keating had breached sections of the Crimes Act in promoting Australia's transition to a republic.

In 1997, he campaigned for election as a delegate to the Australian Constitutional Convention on a republic, representing a joint ticket of the Australian Monarchist League (AML) and Queenslanders for Constitutional Monarchy (QCM).

During this campaign, he delivered a speech titled “The Monarchy and Republicanism – The European Perspective” at the Monarchist League in Brisbane.

Beyond constitutional matters, Helon has advocated extensively on social issues. He has worked on behalf of carers, aged care recipients, individuals with rare diseases and genetic disorders, and survivors of child sexual abuse.

Since 2014, he has acted as a Child Sexual Abuse Victim Survivor Advocate, and in 2018, he began initiatives supporting patients and families affected by rare medical conditions. From September 2021, Helon has served as a National Carer Advocate. Additionally, he served on the Toowoomba Regional Access and Disability Advisory Committee (RADAC) from 2012 to 2013, contributing to disability access and policy development.

== Awards ==
In 2016, Helon received the Freedom of the City of London.

On 17 April 2019, Helon was publicly recognised for his long service as a Justice of the Peace by the State of Queensland when the Shadow Attorney-General and Shadow Minister for Justice David Janetzki MP presented him with an award for 25 years of distinguished service as a Justice of the Peace.

Helon was commissioned a Kentucky Colonel on 15 April 2020 during the governorship of The Honourable Andy Beshear, Governor of the Commonwealth of Kentucky. Appointment as a Kentucky Colonel is the highest civilian honour the Governor of the Commonwealth of Kentucky can bestow.

== Grant of Arms ==
George William Helon in the State of Queensland in the Commonwealth of Australia was granted Arms, Crest and Badge by Her Majesty's College of Arms on 7 May 2020 by Letters Patent of Garter, Clarenceux and Norroy and Ulster Kings of Arms.

Coat of arms of George Helon
Notes In the creation of his Coat of Arms and heraldic ensigns, Helon "worked closely with York Herald (Michael ‘Peter’ Desmond O’Donoghue) over a period of months." Crest Upon a Helm with a Wreath Argent and Gules Perched on the top of a Tower Gules a Rufous Owl affronty displayed proper supporting with the wing tips a Boomerang Or. Mantled Gules doubled Argent. Escutcheon Gules an Eagle displayed Argent attached to each foot by a manacle a broken chain the wings surmounting on either side a Scroll palewise Or. Motto (Latin) AVORUM HONORI (‘For the Honour of Our Ancestors’). Badge A Turtle palewise Azure charged on the shell with a Sprig of Golden Wattle Or.

== Controversy ==
On 1 December 2016 Helon ignited a national controversy in Australia after he circulated a picture on Twitter and Facebook featuring nine golliwog dolls placed underneath a sign at a Terry White Chemists in Toowoomba which invited shoppers to "Experience a White Christmas." Helon told the Toowoomba Chronicle "It's a bit of a shocker, I walked past and thought – what?" “I showed a photo to other people and they said, ‘what the hell?’ I don't think there was any ill intent, it was just inappropriately placed."

Australian Aboriginal activist, author and filmmaker Stephen Hagan described Toowoomba as the "most racist city in Australia". Hagan told SBS news that "there's no place for Golliwogs in Australian society now. To me and to all people of colour, it's a depiction of a racist era when black people didn't have any rights."

Terry White Chemists subsequently banned the sale of such dolls from any franchise nationwide and the franchisee "unreservedly apologised" for the "regrettable error".

== Bibliography ==
Publication year	Title	Original publisher	ISBN	Notes
1984	Book of Love and Destruction	Self-published	ISBN 9780959088120	Poetry
1984	Scattered Thoughts	Self-published	ISBN 095908813X	Epigrams
1984	All for Dreamers	Self-published	ISBN 0959088113	Poetry
1991	Free Spirit	Generation Tree	ISBN 0646026658	Poetry
1993	By Another Name: A Four Language Guide to Christian Names and Their Foreign Equivalents	Polish Genealogical Society of Australia	ISBN 0646171631	
1994	Polish-German Place Name Changes	Polish Genealogical Society of Australia	ISBN 064618153X	
1994	Destination Australia : Extracts from the Wuerttemberg Emigration Index	Polish Genealogical Society of Australia	ISBN 0646191608	
1994	The English-Gooreng Gooreng-English Dictionary	Gurang Land Council	ISBN 0646206540	
1994	Index to the Newsletters, Journals, and Bulletins of the Polish Genealogical Society of America, 1979–1993	Polish Genealogical Society of America	ISBN 0924207019	Compiled with Rosemary A. Chorzempa
1998	The Gooreng Gooreng Tribe of South-east Queensland: Its Traditional Tribal Territory, Clan Divisions and Proper Names	Centre for Historical, Aboriginal and International Research		Map
1998	Aboriginal Australia: Register of Tribe, Clan, Horde, Linguistic Group, Language Names and AIATSIS Language Codes – including Synonyms, Misnomers and Approximate Locations	Centre for Historical, Aboriginal and International Research	ISBN 0646352121	
1998	First Names of the Polish Commonwealth: Origins & Meanings	Polish Genealogical Society of America	ISBN 092420706X	Written with William F. Hoffman
2022	First Names of the Polish-Lithuanian Commonwealth: Origins & Meanings	Language and Lineage Press	ISBN 978-0-9985857-7-2	Written with William F. Hoffman
