= Karin Sowada =

Australian politician (born 1961)

Senator for New South Wales
- In office 29 August 1991 – 30 June 1993
- Preceded by: Paul McLean

Personal details
- Born: 1 November 1961 (age 65) Sydney
- Party: Australian Democrats
- Education: University of Sydney
- Occupation: Archaeologist

Karin Nicole Sowada (born 1 November 1961) is an Australian archaeologist and former politician. She served two years as an Australian Democrats senator for New South Wales between 1991 and 1993. In 1998, she was a republican delegate to the Constitutional Convention. From 1996 to 2005, she was the assistant curator of the Nicholson Museum at the University of Sydney. From 2008 to 2015, she was chief executive officer of the Anglican Deaconess Institution Sydney.

== Early life and education ==
Sowada was born in Sydney in November 1961, the first of three children to Valentin and Helen Sowada. Her father was a photographer whose picture "The Rigger" was published by the Sydney Morning Herald in 1965. She went to Bronte Public School and Randwick North High School and started her working life as a strapper in the thoroughbred horse racing industry. She briefly worked as an insurance broker before commencing studies at the University of Sydney. She graduated with a Bachelor of Arts in archaeology in 1989.

== Political career ==
In 1982, Sowada joined the Australian Democrats. She stood for public office the following year at the age of 21, when she was selected as the Democrat candidate for the House of Representatives seat of Phillip at the 1983 election, polling 2.8% of the vote.(See Electoral results for the Division of Phillip#Elections in the 1980s) She was again the Democrat candidate when then Prime Minister Bob Hawke called a double dissolution election in 1984, and improved her vote, gaining 5.5%. Sowada made a final bid for the seat at the 1987 election. The Democrats were polling well federally at the time, and her campaign received some media attention, resulting in her polling 6.8% of the vote, which gained her some attention within the party in advance of her 1990 Senate bid.

Sowada served as the Democrat campaign manager for the 1988 NSW State election and the 1990 federal election. An investigation was held into irregularities in campaign funding at the time, but Sowada was not involved and initiated legal action against media organisations who suggested otherwise at the time.

Sowada then shifted her attention to the Senate, and gained second place on the Democrat New South Wales Senate ticket for the 1990 election, behind Vicki Bourne. In 1991, Paul McLean resigned from the Senate after leader Janet Powell was replaced by John Coulter. Sowada was nominated by the party to fill the casual vacancy and was sworn in as a Senator in September 1991. She was, at the time, the youngest female senator in Australian history (a distinction which later passed to Natasha Stott Despoja).

Sowada was assigned the role of spokesperson on industrial relations, and she controversially backed the Hawke government's move to enshrine the right to strike in legislation. While this stand earned her much praise from the trade union movement – in September, she became the first female politician and first Democrat to address the biennial congress of the Australian Council of Trade Unions – it also sparked a major clash with party founder Don Chipp, who threatened to resign from the party because of the direction the party was taking with Sowada in charge of industrial relations. When Coulter officially took over as leader in October, Sowada lost the industrial relations portfolio. Soon after, she crossed the floor to vote with the opposition Liberal Party against a move to ban political advertising during elections.

In 1992, Sowada helped to set up a mentoring program for the intellectually disabled in Sydney, and was assigned the services of then student politician Stott Despoja as a staffer. In June that year, Sowada accused her party of neglecting its traditional focus on social issues to concentrate on environmental issues under Coulter, a noted environmentalist. She was active in the education debate, which had taken centre stage owing to the draconian tertiary-education reforms initiated by former Hawke education minister, John Dawkins.

Sowada faced her first and only electoral test at the 1993 election. After a month-long count, she was defeated by the National Party's Sandy Macdonald. She blamed party leader Coulter for the swing against the Democrats, which saw her lose her seat and called for him to be replaced by Cheryl Kernot.

=== Constitutional Convention ===
In 1997, Sowada made a brief return to political life when she was nominated to become an Australian Republican Movement delegate to the 1998 Constitutional Convention on whether Australia should become a republic. She became a prominent spokesperson for the Australian Republican Movement during the convention, vigorously opposing direct election of the president and supporting the movement's sometimes-controversial leader, Malcolm Turnbull.

After the Convention put forward a republic model to be voted upon at the 1999 referendum, Sowada was appointed to a three-person committee directing the official "Yes" campaign, along with Liberal Party figure Andrew Robb and Peter Barron, a Labor Party adviser.

== Academic career ==
Sowada was undertaking a postgraduate degree at the University of Sydney when she was appointed to the Senate, and spent the 1991-92 parliamentary recess in an archaeological dig in Jordan. After her electoral defeat, she resumed her studies, gaining her PhD in Egyptian archaeology from the University of Sydney in May 2002.

Sowada undertakes archeological fieldwork and research in Egypt and Jordan and has published in scholarly books, academic journals and popular magazines. She has lectured around Australia and appeared as a media commentator on archaeology and Egyptology.

From 1996 to 2005, she was the assistant curator of the Nicholson Museum at the University of Sydney. She was controversially passed over for the job when it was revised while she was on maternity leave and she had to reapply for it. She is a researcher in Egyptian archaeology with Macquarie University and is a specialist in the foreign relations of Egypt and the Near East during the Bronze Age.

In 2008, Sowada was appointed as Chief Executive Officer of the Anglican Deaconess Institution Sydney. She stepped down from the role in February 2015. She has been elected to a number of committees in the Anglican Church Sydney Diocese, including the Standing Committee, Sydney Synod and General Synod. She also acted as a lobbyist for Capitol Research, a small corporate communications company run by her and her husband.

== Personal life ==
Sowada married then-Democrat staffer Armon Hicks in July 1991. They have two daughters, born in 1997 and 2004.
