= Michael Denborough =

Australian medical researcher and politician

Michael Antony Denborough AM (11 July 1929 – 8 February 2014) was an Australian academic and medical researcher who founded the Nuclear Disarmament Party.

Denborough was born in Salisbury, Rhodesia (now Harare, Zimbabwe) to Paul Peter Denborough and Alma Mary Hepburn. He was educated at Prince Edward School in Salisbury and the University of Cape Town before being awarded a Rhodes Scholarship to Exeter College, Oxford, where he was an assistant at the Nuffield Department of Clinical Medicine, Radcliffe Infirmary. He married Erica Elizabeth Griffith Brown on 12 December 1959. He was Resident Medical Officer at the National Heart Hospital in London in 1958 before travelling to Australia, where he was first assistant at the University of Melbourne and Royal Melbourne Hospital from 1960 to 1968, reader in medicine at the University of Melbourne from 1972 to 1974 and was a professorial fellow at the John Curtin School of Medical Research in Canberra from 1974 to 1991, working as acting head of the Department of Clinical Science from 1975 to 1981 and acting director of the Centre for Resource and Environmental Studies in 1982. He edited The Role of Calcium in Drug Action, the research for which centred on malignant hyperthermia which he described in 1962 and tentatively linked with Sudden Infant Death Syndrome. From 1992 to 1994 he was professor of the John Curtin School of Medical Research at the Australian National University, retiring in 1995. He later became an emeritus professor.

Denborough founded the Nuclear Disarmament Party (NDP) in 1984 and was a candidate in the Australian Capital Territory for the Senate in the Federal elections of 1987, 1990 and 2007. He published Australia and Nuclear War in 1984. NDP Senators Jo Vallentine and Robert Wood were elected in 1984 and 1987 respectively.

In 2003 he conducted a lone vigil for 52 days outside Parliament House, Canberra, in protest at what he considered was the unjust invasion of Iraq.

He was appointed a Member of the Order of Australia in 1999. He died on 8 February 2014, survived by his wife, four children and six grandchildren.

== See also ==
- List of peace activists
- Anti-nuclear movement in Australia
