= Nhill College =

Location
- Whitehead Avenue; Nhill, Victoria; Australia
- Coordinates: 36°19′55″S 141°39′30″E

Information
- Type: Public
- Principal: Mark Zimmermann
- Grades: F–12
- Enrollment: 345 (2014)
- Website: www.nhillcollege.vic.edu.au

Nhill College is a public F–12 College located in Nhill, Victoria, Australia. The College is the main provider of education for Nhill and the surrounding district, especially for secondary education where the only other option for families is sending students to boarding schools at larger regional centers.

Originally two separate schools on the same site, the primary and secondary schools merged to become the current F–12 under the guidance of then principal Neville Trotman.

As of 2014 there were 345 enrolments in Nhill College, with 130 primary students and 215 secondary students. Enrolments have generally remained stable, with numbers in the secondary section increasing slightly since the previous year.
