= Kerang Technical High School =

Location
- Murray Street; Kerang, Victoria, 3579; Australia
- Coordinates: 35°43′29″S 143°54′46″E

Information
- Motto: Finis Cononat Opus
- Founded: 1913
- Principal: Dean Rogers
- Teaching staff: 41
- Enrolment: 420
- Houses: Loddon and Murray

Kerang Technical High School is an Australian high school located in Kerang, Victoria. Students come from Kerang and the surrounding towns of Koondrook, Quambatook, Boort, Lake Charm, Murrabit, Pyramid Hill and Macorna as well as Barham in New South Wales.

The school has approximately 420 students. The school emblem is an ibis; a common animal in the district. Finis Cononat Opus is the school motto.

The school houses are:

- Loddon
- Murray
