= Irina Dunn =

Australian politician (born 1948)

Senator for New South Wales
- In office 21 July 1988 – 30 June 1990
- Preceded by: Robert Wood

Personal details
- Born: 17 March 1948 (age 78) Shanghai, China
- Party: NDP (1988); Independent (1988–90)
- Education: University of Sydney

Irina Patsi Dunn (born 17 March 1948) is an Australian writer, social activist and filmmaker, who served in the Australian Senate between 1988 and 1990. Born in Shanghai, Dunn grew up in Australia and studied at the University of Sydney.

In 1988, she became a senator representing the Nuclear Disarmament Party. She was chosen following the disqualification from parliament of the man originally elected from that party in the 1987 election, Robert Wood, who was ruled ineligible as he did not hold Australian citizenship. Following her refusal to resign to allow Wood to return to the Senate once he had become a citizen, she was expelled from the party and sat as an independent. She was defeated at the 1990 election.

Dunn was the executive director of the New South Wales Writers' Centre from December 1992 to 2008.

== Background ==
Dunn was born in Shanghai, China, to Raisa Andreevna (née Yakimenko) and Timothy Edward Dunn. Her mother was a Shanghai Russian, while her father was of Irish, Portuguese, and Chinese descent. Her father worked for the North China Daily News and was associated with the Kuomintang. After the conclusion of the Chinese Civil War the family was forced to flee to Hong Kong. They later immigrated to Australia, settling in Sydney where Dunn attended SCECGS Redlands and Strathfield Girls High School. She was naturalised as an Australian citizen in 1974. After graduating in Arts from the University of Sydney, Dunn held several jobs, including as an editor at Pergamon Press. It was here that she first drew publicity for activism. Dunn complained to a recruitment firm about sexism in their advertisements; however, her attachment of her business card to the letter got her fired, an action which became front-page news in Sydney. She was later partly reinstated.

In the early 1980s, she married Brett Collins, a convicted bank robber turned prison activist and co-ordinator of Justice Action, whom she met through her work editing a prison magazine. They separated within a few years and subsequently divorced. Throughout this period Dunn was engaged with political and social issues.

== Political career ==
Dunn was an activist through the 1970s and 1980s, and was particularly involved in the campaign to free from jail three men—Tim Anderson, Ross Dunn and Paul Alister—implicated in the Sydney Hilton Hotel bombing. Their eventual release (Anderson was in fact jailed again, before having his sentence quashed a second time in the early 1990s) was something Dunn regarded as her most significant achievement.

Dunn was Senator for New South Wales first representing the Nuclear Disarmament Party (NDP), then as an independent. She became a Senator—notably, the first with Asian ancestry —in unusual circumstances, when Robert Wood was disqualified under section 44 of the constitution from holding the seat he had won in the 1987 general election. The High Court of Australia sitting as the Court of Disputed Returns found that a recount of the NSW Senate ballots could occur and Dunn, who had been the second person on the NDP's New South Wales Senate ticket, was elected. The NDP asked her to resign her seat to allow Wood to take it up once he had taken up Australian citizenship, but Dunn refused, leading to her expulsion from the NDP, after which she sat in parliament as an independent. She was a Senator from 21 July 1988 until 30 June 1990, being defeated in the 1990 election. During her time in office Dunn was active on one of the Australian Senate committees: Foreign Affairs, Defence and Trade. She was responsible for an extensive minority report to that committee's report Visits to Australia by Nuclear Powered or Armed Vessels.

Dunn also stood for the Balmain/Rozelle Ward of Leichhardt Council in 1999 on the "Community Independents" ticket but was unsuccessful.

== Dunn as writer and filmmaker ==
Dunn was co-author of A Natural Legacy: Ecology in Australia, an early textbook on the Australian environment. Dunn has worked as an editor and made documentary films, including Frame-Up and Fighting for Peace (see bibliography).

Dunn coined the famous catch phrase: "A woman needs a man like a fish needs a bicycle", which was subsequently popularised by Gloria Steinem and became a popular slogan among feminists. Later, U2 used the phrase in their song "Tryin' to Throw Your Arms Around the World".

Irina Dunn was the executive director of the New South Wales Writers' Centre from December 1992. She resigned in 2008. Her experience in that role led her to write The Writer's Guide: A companion to writing for pleasure or publication.

== Bibliography ==
- Frame-Up: Who Bombed the Hilton, Who Didn't? (1983)
- Fighting For Peace: A History of the Australian Women's Peace Movement. (Sydney: Film Australia, 1984)
- A Natural Legacy: Ecology in Australia. (Co-edited) (Sydney: Pergamon, 1979; 1986)
- Aspirations and Obstacles: Papers from the second Women Into Politics Workshop. (editor) (Sydney: Women Into Politics, 1994)
- The bioregions of New South Wales: A practical guide to the assessment of their biodiversity. (National Parks and Wildlife Service, 2002)
- The Writer's Guide: A companion to writing for pleasure or publication. (Sydney: Allen & Unwin, 1999; 2002)
