= Stephen Loosley =

Australian politician (born 1952)

Stephen Loosley AM FRSN

National President of the Labor Party
- In office 25 June 1991 – 6 June 1992
- Preceded by: John Bannon
- Succeeded by: Barry Jones

Senator for New South Wales
- In office 1 July 1990 – 19 May 1995
- Succeeded by: Tom Wheelwright

Personal details
- Born: 29 December 1952 (age 73) Carlton, New South Wales, Australia
- Party: Labor
- Education: University of New South Wales
- Occupation: Lawyer

Stephen Loosley (born 29 December 1952) is an Australian lawyer and former politician. He was a New South Wales Labor Senator from 1990 to 1995.

== Early life ==
Loosley was born on 29 December 1952 in Carlton, New South Wales. He is the son of Jean Elizabeth (née Pike) and Bernard Alan Loosley.

Loosley was educated at Carlton Public School before attending Sydney Technical High School from 1965. Between 1972 and 1975 he undertook a Bachelor of Arts degree at the University of New South Wales, graduating with first-class honours in political science.

== Politics ==
=== Early involvement ===
Loosley joined the ALP in 1972 and was mentored by Graham Richardson. In 1976 he began working as a research officer for Senator Kerry Sibraa. He subsequently joined the ALP headquarters as an organiser in 1977, becoming assistant general secretary in 1979 and succeeding Richardson as general secretary in 1983.

=== Senate ===
At the 1990 federal election, Loosley was elected to a six-year Senate term as the ALP's lead candidate in New South Wales.

In the Senate, Loosley spoke frequently on foreign policy and human rights matters. He served as chair of the Joint Standing Committee on Foreign Affairs, Defence and Trade from 1993 to 1995. He resigned from the Senate on 21 May 1995, in order to pursue a legal career and for family reasons.

Loosley served as National President of the ALP between 1991 and 1992, when he was pressured to resign amid controversy.

== Later activities ==
Loosley completed a law degree in 1997, which he had begun in 1993 while still in the Senate. He joined Sydney law firm Dunhill Madden Butler, initially as director of its international and trade law division. He was made a partner in 1996 and remained with the firm following its acquisition by PricewaterhouseCoopers in 1999, leaving in 2006 to join Babcock & Brown as a strategic adviser. After that firm went into liquidation in 2009 he worked for Minter Ellison until 2015 as a strategic counsel.

Since March 17, 2008 Loosley has been the deputy chairman, Non-Executive Director, of Thales Group on the Australian board of directors.

Loosley is an expert on American politics and is a regular commentator on US elections in Australian media outlets.

In 2018, he was elected a Fellow of the Royal Society of New South Wales.

Party political offices
Preceded by Graham Richardson	General Secretary of the Australian Labor Party (NSW Branch); 1983–1990	Succeeded by John Della Bosca
