= Sid Spindler =

Australian politician

Senator for Victoria
- In office 1 July 1990 – 30 June 1996
- Preceded by: David Hamer
- Succeeded by: Lyn Allison

Personal details
- Born: Siegfried Emil Spindler; 9 July 1932 Łódź, Poland
- Died: 1 March 2008 (aged 75) Richmond, Victoria, Australia
- Party: Australia (until 1977); Democrat (after 1977)
- Education: University of Melbourne
- Profession: Businessman politician

Siegfried Emil "Sid" Spindler (9 July 1932 – 1 March 2008) was an Australian politician who served as a Senator for Victoria from 1990 to 1996, representing the Australian Democrats.

== Early life ==
Spindler was born in Łódź, Poland, to an ethnic German family. He was the son of Gertrud Alma (née Bernewitz) and Oskar Karl Spindler; his father was a businessman. Spindler was considered part of the Volksdeutsche by the Nazi regime, and after the German invasion of Poland in 1939 was required to join the Deutsches Jungvolk (part of the Hitler Youth). When Germany's Eastern Front collapsed in 1944, Spindler and other children of Łódź were evacuated to a rural estate north of the city. In January 1945, he and his companions were forced to flee west on foot to escape the advancing Red Army; many of them were killed by starvation, exposure, or bombing raids. Spindler was eventually reunited with his family in Magdeburg, and they settled in Weißenfels, Saxony-Anhalt, which became part of the Soviet occupation zone and later East Germany. He was blacklisted from attending university due to his anti-Soviet views, and at the age of 17 was granted permission to move to Australia, sponsored by a relative who had settled in Melbourne.

In Australia, Spindler became an apprentice with a painting and decorating company. He became an Australian citizen in 1952. After completing his apprenticeship, he opened his own business, which rapidly grew in size. He also began studying part-time at the University of Melbourne, graduating with a Bachelor of Laws degree in 1967. He sold his business in 1973 to become an administrator with the Outer Eastern Regional Council for Social Development, which had been created by the Whitlam government. He moved to the Northern Territory in 1978, becoming business manager of the Alice Springs Community College; he later worked as a youth advisor for the NT government. Spindler's background as a refugee from World War II Europe influenced what he described as

a personal quest to resolve issues related to the Holocaust, reaching a conclusion that a repetition can be prevented only if every human being is respected and treated equally, regardless of race, religion, gender and sexuality.

== Politics ==
Spindler was an organiser and candidate for the Australia Party in the 1970s, before joining the Australian Democrats and becoming senior adviser to Don Chipp and Janine Haines. He was Victorian state president of the Democrats from 1985 to 1989 and a national vice-president from 1987 to 1990. He was elected as a senator for Victoria in 1990, serving from 1 July 1990 to 30 June 1996 and managing a range of shadow-ministerial portfolios, as was mandatory for all Democrat parliamentarians. In parliament he spoke in support of the rights of Aboriginal people, refugees, prisoners, pensioners, taxpayers and the environment. He also spoke and campaigned against child labour and sexual discrimination. He retired from the Senate at the end of his term in 1996.

Spindler's relationship with Janet Powell, then leader of the Democrats, was used as leverage to remove Powell from the leadership in 1991.

== Later life ==
Spindler and his family established the Towards a Just Society Fund in 2002, which distributes $200,000 annually to help Aboriginal students. He died of liver cancer in the Epworth Hospital in Melbourne, on his fiftieth wedding anniversary. He was survived by his wife Julia and their four children, Kerry, Chris, Lindy and Bec.
