= Australian Conservative Party =

- Abbreviation: ACP
- Founder: Joh Bjelke-Petersen; Lin Powell
- Founded: 8 December 1989
- Registered: 8 December 1989
- Dissolved: 1991; 35 years ago
- Split from: National
- Ideology: Conservatism; Agrarianism; Economic liberalism
- Political position: Right-wing
- Religion: Christianity (Lutheran)
- Colours: Blue

The Australian Conservative Party was founded as a registered political party in 1989, under the leadership of Sir Joh Bjelke-Petersen, the Premier of Queensland from 1968 to 1988. It remained active until 1991 when it was deregistered by the Australian Electoral Commission (AEC) when the membership fell below the required 500 members. The party then attempted to reform under the "Australian Conservative Alliance", also known as Australia First, in 1995.

After two years since his ousting as Leader of the National Party, former Queensland Premier, Sir Joh, announced the launching of a new conservative political party, the Australian Conservative Party, in front of one-hundred people in Hervey Bay, Queensland. He created the party alongside Lin Powell.

== See also ==
Joh for Canberra
