= Robert Bell (Australian politician) =

Australian politician

Senator for Tasmania
- In office 7 March 1990 – 1 July 1996
- Preceded by: Norm Sanders

Personal details
- Born: 22 July 1950 Hobart, Tasmania, Australia
- Died: 6 September 2001 (aged 51) New South Wales, Australia
- Party: Democrats
- Profession: Schoolteacher

Robert John Bell (22 July 1950 – 6 September 2001) was an Australian schoolteacher, politician and conservationist. He served as a Senator for Tasmania from 1990 to 1996, representing the Australian Democrats. He was the party's last elected official in Tasmania.

== Early life ==
Bell was born in Hobart on 22 July 1950. He spent his early years at Bronte Park where his father worked for the Hydro-Electric Commission.

Bell's parents separated when he was a young child and he was raised by his mother Frances (née Doran) and maternal grandparents Frederick and Madge Doran; he later took the name of his adoptive father Trevor Bell. His mother was a schoolteacher and taught in a number of small towns in northern Tasmania, including Myrtle Park, Westbury and Ringarooma.

Bell completed his secondary education in Launceston and went on to the University of Tasmania in Hobart, graduating Bachelor of Arts in 1971 and completing a diploma in education the following year. He subsequently taught at primary and secondary level for eight years, including six years at the Friends' School, Hobart. He later worked in adult education, including teaching prisoners at Risdon Gaol. He was awarded an ANZAC fellowship in 1984 to undertake further studies in New Zealand.

== Politics ==
As a student Bell participated in the Vietnam Moratorium Campaign and the Lake Pedder Action Committee protests against the flooding of Lake Pedder. He did not join a political party until the 1980s, when he became a member of the Australian Democrats. He contested the House of Representatives seat of Denison for the party at the 1987 federal election. Bell was elected state president of the Democrats in 1988 and served on the Hobart City Council from 1988 to 1990. He began working for Senator Norm Sanders as a research officer and also stood unsuccessfully at the 1989 state election.

=== Senate ===
Bell was elected to a six-year Senate term at the 1990 federal election, replacing Sanders as the Democrats' lead candidate in Tasmania. Sanders resigned his Tasmanian seat in March 1990 in order to stand for election to an Australian Capital Territory seat. Following Sanders' resignation, Bell was appointed to the casual vacancy on 10 April 1990 prior to the start of his statutory term on 1 July 1990.

In parliament, Bell "spoke frequently in the Senate on conservation issues, especially regarding forestry and old-growth trees" and was "especially fierce in opposition to clear-felling and woodchipping". He served as his party's spokesman across a variety of portfolios and was a member of numerous parliamentary committees.

Bell was defeated at the 1996 federal election, with his term expiring on 30 June 1996. His campaign for re-election was framed as a contest against Australian Greens candidate Bob Brown for Tasmania's sixth seat. Brown campaigned on the left of Bell and drew attention to the Democrats' decision to direct preferences to right-wing Call to Australia candidate Fred Nile over Brown. Bell later described Brown's campaign as "vicious, negative and personal" and began defamation proceedings after being portrayed as "pro-logging" by Brown's supporters.

== Later life ==
After leaving parliament, Bell operated a general store in Battery Point. He unsuccessfully stood for the state seat of Franklin at the 1998 state election and for the Senate at the 1998 federal election.

Bell died on 6 September 2001, aged 51, after suffering a fatal heart attack while driving between Wollongong and Port Kembla, New South Wales.
