= Nuclear Disarmament Party =

- Founder: Michael Denborough
- Founded: June 1984
- Dissolved: December 2009
- Ideology: Nuclear disarmament
- International affiliation: World Ecological Parties (Network member)
- Senate: 1 / 76 (1987)

Website
- nucleardisarmament.org (archive)

The Nuclear Disarmament Party (NDP) was an Australian political party formed in June 1984. It was founded by medical researcher Michael Denborough as the political arm of the Australian anti-nuclear movement, which had been active since the early 1970s.

The NDP primarily attracted left-wing Labor Party voters who were disillusioned with Bob Hawke's pro-nuclear stance. At the 1984 federal election, the NDP polled 7.23 percent of the total Senate vote, electing Jo Vallentine as a senator for Western Australia. However, Vallentine resigned from the party before taking her seat, due to allegations of a takeover by Trotskyists affiliated with the Socialist Workers Party. The NDP's vote collapsed to 1.1 percent at the 1987 election – a double dissolution. Robert Wood was elected as a senator for New South Wales, but after less than a year in office was disqualified by the Court of Disputed Returns and replaced by Irina Dunn. However, Dunn was expelled from the party after less than a month in office, and like Vallentine served out the rest of her term as an independent.

The NDP had no electoral success after 1987, and the 1990 election was the last at which the party ran a serious campaign. After several years of inactivity, the party was revived for the 1998 election. It attracted little support in its second manifestation, and was eventually formally disbanded in December 2009, when it voluntarily relinquished its registration with the Australian Electoral Commission (AEC). In the meantime, many of its initial members had either returned to the Labor Party or become involved with the Australian Greens.

== Foundation, the 1984 election, and the split ==
The NDP was founded by Canberra doctor and peace activist Michael Denborough in response to the world political situation in the early 1980s, particularly the arms race between the United States under Ronald Reagan and the Soviet Union. Such activists were disappointed that the Australian Labor Party government of Bob Hawke, elected in 1983, had not taken a stronger stance against the policies of the U.S., and also that Hawke had overturned a long-standing ALP policy not to mine uranium, and had allowed mining in South Australia at Olympic Dam near Roxby Downs, which has since become one of the largest uranium mines in the world.

At the December 1984 federal election the NDP received 643,061 votes (7.23% of the total), and exceeded 4% in every state except Tasmania, where it received 3.9%. Amongst the NDP candidates were Peter Garrett, a rock singer, and Jean Melzer, a former Victorian ALP senator. Garrett polled 9.6% of the vote in NSW, and Melzer polled 7.3% in Victoria. Because of an adverse distribution of preferences (see Australian electoral system), neither Garrett nor Melzer was elected. However, Western Australian peace activist Jo Vallentine was elected to the Senate.

In April 1985, Vallentine, Garrett and Melzer, along with 30 other members, walked out of the national conference in Melbourne and resigned from the NDP, claiming that the party had been taken over by the Socialist Workers Party (SWP), a Trotskyist group. In the wake of the split, Vallentine became an independent 'senator for nuclear disarmament' and went on to be re-elected as a ‘Vallentine Peace Group’ candidate in the double dissolution election of 1987.

== 1985 Nunawading by-election ==
Due to a tied vote in the Victorian upper house province of Nunawading, and having the winning vote drawn from a hat, a Labor government for the first time in its history had control of the Victorian Legislative Council. A fresh election was ordered by the Court of Disputed Returns. The Liberals won re-election and Labor lost its slim majority. Within a week of polling day Mr Martin Peake, Chairman of the Victorian Nuclear Disarmament Party, lodged an official complaint with the Chief Electoral Officer of Victoria, about a deceptive NDP how to vote card handed out at the booths. In essence, the Victorian ALP state secretary organised forged NDP how-to-vote cards and members of the Labor Party were recognised handing out this card and that the allocation of preferences to the ALP on the card damaged the NDP. The government entered a cover-up to protect its state secretary Peter Batchelor and the Labor party. As police investigated the case, the culprits blamed the Socialist Workers Party.

== 1987 federal election and aftermath ==
After this the NDP consisted of a group of activists led by Denborough. At the July 1987 federal election, the party's Senate vote in New South Wales fell from 9.6% to 1.5%. However, after distribution of preferences from other minor parties, the NDP's Robert Wood received more than the 7.7% quota, and hence was duly elected. In May 1988, however, Wood, who was born in the United Kingdom, was disqualified from membership of the Senate on the grounds that he had not been an Australian citizen at the time of nomination. Wood's seat was won on a recount of the ballots by the second candidate on the NDP ticket in NSW, Irina Dunn.

When Wood was subsequently granted Australian citizenship he became eligible to be a member of parliament. The New South Wales Branch of the NDP asked Dunn to resign so they could seek to have Wood appointed to fill the casual vacancy. This might have allowed Wood to re-enter the Senate, but Dunn refused, citing various difficulties and risks with this scenario. The NDP state branch passed a vote of no confidence in her, and she resigned from the party on 22 August 1988, the day she was sworn in to the senate. Like Wood and Vallentine, Dunn described herself as a Senator for Nuclear Disarmament having already distanced herself from the NDP. She lost her Senate place at the 1990 election.

== Later years and demise ==
At the 1990 election, the NDP only ran candidates in New South Wales, the Australian Capital Territory, and the Northern Territory. Robert Wood was the lead candidate in New South Wales, and polled 1.04% of the statewide senate vote – more than Irina Dunn's independent ticket, but not nearly enough to be elected. The NDP was voluntarily deregistered by the Australian Electoral Commission (AEC) on 23 April 1992. It was re-registered on 7 May 1998, and stood candidates at another four federal elections (1998, 2001, 2004, and 2007) before again being voluntarily deregistered in December 2009.

== See also ==
- Anti-nuclear movement in Australia
- British nuclear tests at Maralinga
- Campaign Against Nuclear Energy
- New Zealand's nuclear-free zone
- Nuclear disarmament
- Uranium mining controversy in Kakadu National Park

== Newsletter ==
- Newsletter (Nuclear Disarmament Party (Australia). A.C.T. Branch). ISSN 0815-4252. No. 1 ([1984])-no. 38 (Dec. 1991)
