= Robert Wood (Australian politician) =

British-born Australian politician (born 1947)

Senator for New South Wales
- In office 11 July 1987 – 12 May 1988 (Note: Wood's election was declared by the High Court to be invalid as he was not an Australian citizen at the time.)
- Succeeded by: Irina Dunn

Personal details
- Born: 13 November 1949 (age 77) Gateshead, England
- Party: Nuclear Disarmament Party
- Occupation: Social worker

William Robert Wood (born 13 November 1949) is a British-born Australian who has campaigned on peace and justice issues. He was elected to the Australian Parliament in the 1987 elections as Senator for New South Wales, however the High Court subsequently declared his election was invalid as he was not an Australian citizen at the time.

== Background ==
Robert Wood was born in Gateshead in England. His father was an English steelworker; his mother was Italian. The family emigrated to Australia in 1963 as assisted passage migrants. Wood studied social work in both Sydney and Melbourne, and had a career as a youth and social worker prior to becoming a member of parliament. However, he was unemployed at the time of his election, with one newspaper suggesting he was 'probably the only Member of Parliament to have been elected while on the dole'. Wood has two children.

== Wood and the Nuclear Disarmament Party ==
Wood was a member of the Nuclear Disarmament Party (NDP), and was its candidate at the NSW Vaucluse by-election in 1986. The NDP had failed narrowly to win a Senate seat in the 1984 federal election, when Midnight Oil singer Peter Garrett had stood under the party's banner. In 1987, the party had a lower profile, and Wood was at the head of its NSW Senate ticket. Though the party received only 1.53 per cent of the vote, Wood was elected as a result of preference flows from other parties, and the quota being nearly halved due to a double dissolution election for all Senate seats. This was the lowest primary vote ever received by a successful minor party or independent candidate in an Australian Senate election, until 2013 when Ricky Muir was elected on a primary vote of 0.51%.

Wood took his place in the Senate in August 1987.

== Nile v Wood ==
Nile v Wood
- Court: High Court of Australia as the Court of Disputed Returns
- Decided: 25 December 1987
- Citations: [1987] HCA 62, (1987) 167 CLR 133

He immediately faced a court challenge from one of the unsuccessful candidates in the election, the Call to Australia party's Elaine Nile. This case was heard by the High Court sitting as the Court of Disputed Returns. There were four grounds of challenge set out in the petition:

- Wood has been convicted of the offence of obstructing shipping, being an offence which carries a term of imprisonment;
- Wood had been convicted in 1972 of offences in relation to National Service, and served a term of imprisonment;
- Wood was insolvent; and
- His actions against the vessels of a friendly nation indicate allegiance, obedience or adherence to a foreign power.

The High Court, Brennan, Deane and Toohey JJ, dismissed the petition in December 1987 on technical grounds. The brief judgment made a number of observations about section 44 of the Constitution

- The disqualification is not simply for the conviction of an offence, but the person must be serving a sentence of imprisonment for one year or more or "subject to be sentenced" for that offence. (Note: A phrase subsequently considered by the High Court in Re Culleton (No 2) [2017] HCA 4.) Thus a person is not disqualified after the sentence has been served.
- the person must have been adjudged to be an "undischarged insolvent"
- the allegation of allegiance to a foreign power did not identify the foreign power nor the acknowledgement of that allegiance.

== Re Wood ==
Re Wood
- Court: High Court of Australia as the Court of Disputed Returns
- Decided: 12 May 1988
- Citations: [1988] HCA 22, (1987) 167 CLR 145

When Wood applied for a passport some months after entering parliament, it transpired that while he was a long-term resident of Australia, he was a citizen of the United Kingdom and had only obtained Australian citizenship on 3 February 1988. The High Court unanimously determined on 12 May 1988 that as he was not an Australian citizen prior to 3 February 1988, he was not entitled to be nominated for election as a senator and therefore had never been validly elected. The decision was based on the explicit requirement in the Commonwealth Electoral Act 1918, that a candidate must be an Australian citizen. The High Court followed Vardon v O'Loghlin, as to the consequence of the void election. Wood's presence in the Senate did not invalidate the proceedings of the Senate. In this case they held that the vacancy could be filled by the further counting or recounting of the ballot papers. The High Court expressly declined to rule on the question of whether being a dual citizen of the United Kingdom would also disqualify a candidate from election. (Note: The High Court subsequently decided that a dual citizen of the United Kingdom was disqualified from election in Sue v Hill [1999] HCA 30, (1999) 199 CLR 462.)

=== Aftermath ===
The recount of the ballot resulted in the election in his place of Irina Dunn, who had been second on the ticket of the NDP. Further controversy occurred when the NDP asked Dunn to resign so that Wood could reclaim his seat, following his assumption of Australian citizenship in 1988. Dunn refused, resulting in her expulsion from the party, and she remained in parliament as an independent until her defeat in the 1990 election. Wood contested that election as the first-ranked candidate for the Nuclear Disarmament Party in New South Wales, polling just over 1 per cent of the vote - more than his former running-mate Dunn, but nowhere near enough to be competitive for a Senate spot.

== Wood and the Australian Democrats ==
In 1988 Wood was unsuccessful as the Nuclear Disarmament Party candidate at the NSW 1988 North Shore by-election. Wood then moved to Victoria and joined the Australian Democrats in 1990. Internal disagreements within the Australian Democrats resulted in the departure of Victorian senator Janet Powell from the party leadership in August 1991, and she resigned from the party altogether in 1992, contesting the 1993 Senate election under her own party banner, the Janet Powell Independents' Network. Wood became the Democrats' lead candidate for the Victorian Senate in the 1993 federal election. He polled 3.93 per cent of the vote, but preferences were unable to get him elected.

== Extra-parliamentary activism ==
Wood campaigned on various peace and justice issues throughout his life. Wood was arrested and jailed in 1972 for refusing to be conscripted to fight in the Vietnam War. He was a founding member of Sydney-based disarmament protest groups, Paddlers for Peace and Sydney Peace Squadron. He was arrested as a result of disarmament protest activities both before and after his time in the Senate. Wood was also active in numerous community-based organisations that assisted people to overcome social and economic disadvantage. During his brief Senate career he had been a member of the Joint Parliamentary Liaison Group on AIDS, and launched the Democrats' policy on AIDS during the 1993 campaign.
