= Christabel Chamarette =

Australian politician

Christabel Chamarette OAM
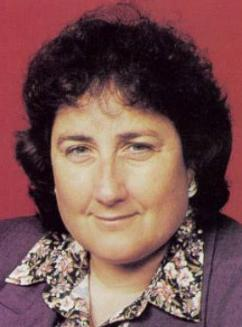

Senator for Western Australia
- In office 12 March 1992 – 30 June 1996
- Preceded by: Jo Vallentine

Personal details
- Born: 1 May 1948 (age 77) Hyderabad State
- Party: Greens WA
- Occupation: Community worker

Christabel Marguerite Alain Chamarette, sometimes known as Christabel Bridge (born 1 May 1948) is a former Greens Senator for Western Australia from 1992 to 1996.

== Personal life ==
Born in Hyderabad, India in 1948, Chamarette is of Anglo-Indian and French Huguenot ancestry. She has worked as a community worker in Bangladesh and later as a clinical psychologist at Fremantle Prison.

== Politics ==
Chamarette was appointed to the Senate in 1992, following the resignation of Jo Vallentine. She was opposed to privatising Telstra and delayed the Mabo legislation by demanding the inclusion of mineral rights in the compensation package for native title holders.

She was defeated at the 1996 general election; her term ended on 30 June 1996. Chamarette said that when working in the Senate, she thought it was the most important work of her life, but she now refers to it as simply "useful experience".

== After politics ==
She was an expert consultant to the Department of Justice and was appointed to the Western Australian parole board in 2002. She was one of four members who resigned in 2005 in protest against the State Government's response to the Mahoney inquiry.

Chamarette was awarded the Medal of the Order of Australia in the 2025 Australia Day Honours for "service to community health, particularly as a psychologist".
