= Vicki Bourne =

Australian politician

Senator for New South Wales
- In office 1 July 1990 – 30 June 2002

Personal details
- Born: 22 October 1954 (age 71) Sydney, New South Wales
- Party: Australian Democrats
- Education: University of New South Wales
- Occupation: Research officer

Vicki Worrall Bourne (born 22 October 1954) is a former Australian Democrats politician. She served as Senator for New South Wales from 1990 to 2002.

Bourne was born in Sydney; she attended the selective Fort Street Girls’ High School, and later graduated from the University of New South Wales. A founding member of the Australian Democrats, she took part in the election campaign for Colin Mason and became his parliamentary research officer and private secretary after he was elected to the Senate in the 1977 Australian federal election. Following Mason’s retirement in 1987, she became a research officer for Senator Paul McLean.

Bourne was elected to the Senate in the 1990 Australian federal election; her term began on 1 July 1990. She was elected for a second term in the 1996 Australian federal election. After she was defeated by Australian Greens candidate Kerry Nettle in the 2001 Australian federal election, her term ended on 30 June 2002.
