= Janet Powell =

Australian politician

Janet Powell AM
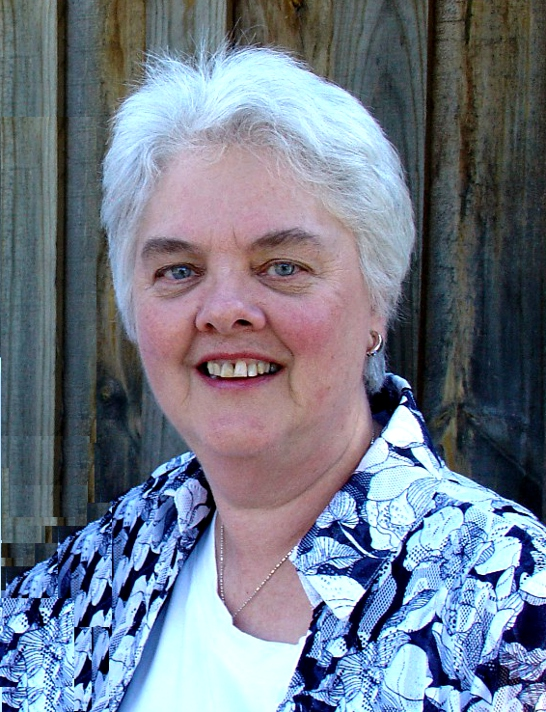

3rd Leader of the Australian Democrats
- In office 1 July 1990 – 19 August 1991
- Deputy: John Coulter
- Preceded by: Michael Macklin
- Succeeded by: John Coulter

Senator for Victoria
- In office 26 August 1986 – 30 June 1993
- Preceded by: Don Chipp

Personal details
- Born: Janet Frances McDonald; 29 September 1942 Nhill, Victoria, Australia
- Died: 30 September 2013 (aged 71) Melbourne, Victoria, Australia
- Party: Green (after 2004)
- Other political affiliations: Democrat (until 1992); Independent (1992–2004)
- Spouse: Alan Powell (m. 1965; div. 1988)
- Domestic partner(s): Sid Spindler (esp. 1987; sep. 1992)
- Children: 4
- Education: Nhill High School; Queen's Church of England Grammar School
- Alma mater: University of Melbourne
- Occupation: School teacher (Kerang High School) (Nhill High School) (Department of Education)
- Profession: Academic; Politician

Janet Frances Powell AM (née McDonald, 29 September 1942 – 30 September 2013) was an Australian politician.

== Early life and career ==
A native of Nhill, Victoria, Powell was educated at Ballarat Grammar School and Nhill High School. She graduated from the University of Melbourne with a Bachelor of Arts and a Diploma of Education. She then worked as a secondary school teacher at Kerang High School and Nhill High School.

== Political career ==
Powell was active in the Australian Democrats in the 1980s, serving as the party's Victorian state president (1983–85) and a national deputy president (1984–86). In 1986, she was appointed a Democrat senator for Victoria, upon the resignation of the party's founder, Don Chipp. She was elected the following year. Following the announcement of the 1987 Senate election results, Powell was one of four senators who received a six-year term as a consequence of which method was chosen to allocate the seats.

She became the third elected leader of the party, from 1 July 1990 to 19 August 1991, when she was deposed in a coup promoted by the party's Queensland division with national executive support. The charge that she had "failed to lift the profile of the party" during her tenure of a year was unsuccessful as justification, and her openly acknowledged relationship with party colleague Sid Spindler was used as leverage to remove her from the leadership. The party's founding leader, Don Chipp, described the coup as the "most tragic story to have hit the Democrats". One suggested reason for the coup was that she was controversially negotiating a coalition or merger with the Greens. After internal disagreements related to her loss of the leadership, she resigned from the party in 1992 and continued as an independent senator until her defeat at the 1993 election. After quitting the Democrats, she reminded the Senate of her non-partisan approach in pursuit of reforms, including a successful private senator's bill:

"In the six years that I have been in this place I have valued most highly the cooperative work that I have been able to do with colleagues on all sides of the chamber...for example, I reflect on the magnificent work done by former Senator Peter Baume which played a large part in enabling the passage, unopposed, through the Parliament of my private member's Bill which banned the print advertising of tobacco products. On the other side, I look forward to a successful result on the question of discrimination against homosexuals in the armed forces as a result of important strategic cooperation between myself, Senator Margaret Reynolds and other Labor Party backbenchers."

In 1996, she campaigned for Greens leader Bob Brown and, in 2004, she joined the Australian Greens, citing that they were more capable of achieving the function of a third force in Australian politics. In the 2006 Victorian state election she unsuccessfully stood for the Greens in the Eastern Metropolitan Region.

== Community service ==
Janet Powell was a member of the Patrons Council of the Epilepsy Foundation of Victoria, a Life Member of YWCA Victoria, and also an inaugural appointee to the Victorian Honour Roll of Women in 2001 "for services to the community".

In the 2012 Queen's Birthday Honours list, she was appointed a Member of the Order of Australia, in recognition of her service to the Parliament and people of Australia, "particularly through leadership of YWCA Victoria".

Party political offices
Preceded by (interim) Michael Macklin	Leader of the Australian Democrats; 1990–1991	Succeeded by John Coulter
