= John Coulter (politician) =

Australian politician (1930–2024)

4th Leader of the Australian Democrats
- In office 2 October 1991 – 29 April 1993
- Deputy: Meg Lees
- Preceded by: Janet Powell
- Succeeded by: Cheryl Kernot

4th Deputy Leader of the Australian Democrats
- In office 24 March 1990 – 2 October 1991
- Preceded by: Michael Macklin
- Succeeded by: Meg Lees

Senator for South Australia
- In office 11 July 1987 – 20 November 1995
- Succeeded by: Natasha Stott Despoja

Personal details
- Born: John Richard Coulter; 3 December 1930 Perth, Western Australia, Australia
- Died: 6 September 2024 (aged 93) Adelaide, South Australia, Australia
- Party: Independent (after 2001)
- Other political affiliations: Democrat (until 2001)
- Spouses: Brenda Bice (m. 1953; div. 1978) Phyllis Johnstone (m. 1984)
- Children: 2
- Education: Wesley College
- Alma mater: University of Western Australia; University of South Australia
- Occupation: General practitioner (Royal Adelaide Hospital) (Institute of Medical and Veterinary Science)
- Profession: Physician; Politician

John Richard Coulter (3 December 1930 – 6 September 2024) was an Australian medical researcher and politician. He was the fourth elected parliamentary Senate leader of the Australian Democrats, serving from 2 October 1991 to 29 April 1993.

In his first speech, he criticised the failure of presently used economic indexes to measure the right things, such as the inclusion of costs as benefits in the measurement of GDP, and the absence of a national capital account giving a misleading impression of becoming richer by squandering natural capital and turning it into cash, which is then frittered away without turning it back into capital. He argued that correcting these misleading indices would reveal the paths toward ecological sustainability and a more humane society.

In his valedictory speech, he took up the case that economic growth is not sustainable and that 'economic rationalism' (neo-classical economics) is an ideology blind to empirical evidence.

His understanding of conservation and environment principles was exceptional for the time. One of Coulter's controversial concerns was the social and economic impact of population growth.

Coulter was born in Perth, Western Australia. He gained a Bachelor of Medicine and Surgery degree at the University of Adelaide. He became a medical practitioner and researcher, and was also a university lecturer.

He was a member of Campbelltown Council in Adelaide from 1973 to 1974. In 1980 he joined the Democrats.

He first took office in the Senate in 1987, representing South Australia, and resigned from the Senate on 20 November 1995, due to ill health. Natasha Stott Despoja was appointed his replacement three days later, having earlier been employed by him as a researcher.

In 1999, he was publicly critical of Meg Lees's leadership of the Democrats, especially of her handling of the Goods and Services Tax legislation. He believed Stott Despoja would make a better leader, and was working towards that goal, which she in fact attained in April 2001.

However, a week before the 2001 federal election, Coulter resigned from the party because he believed Stott Despoja had reduced internal party democracy. He said she had taken the party further away from the grassroots, that it had become pragmatic, and that he could not recommend that people vote for the party.

Party political offices
Preceded by Janet Powell	Leader of the Australian Democrats; 1991–1993	Succeeded by Cheryl Kernot
