= Jo Vallentine =

Australian politician

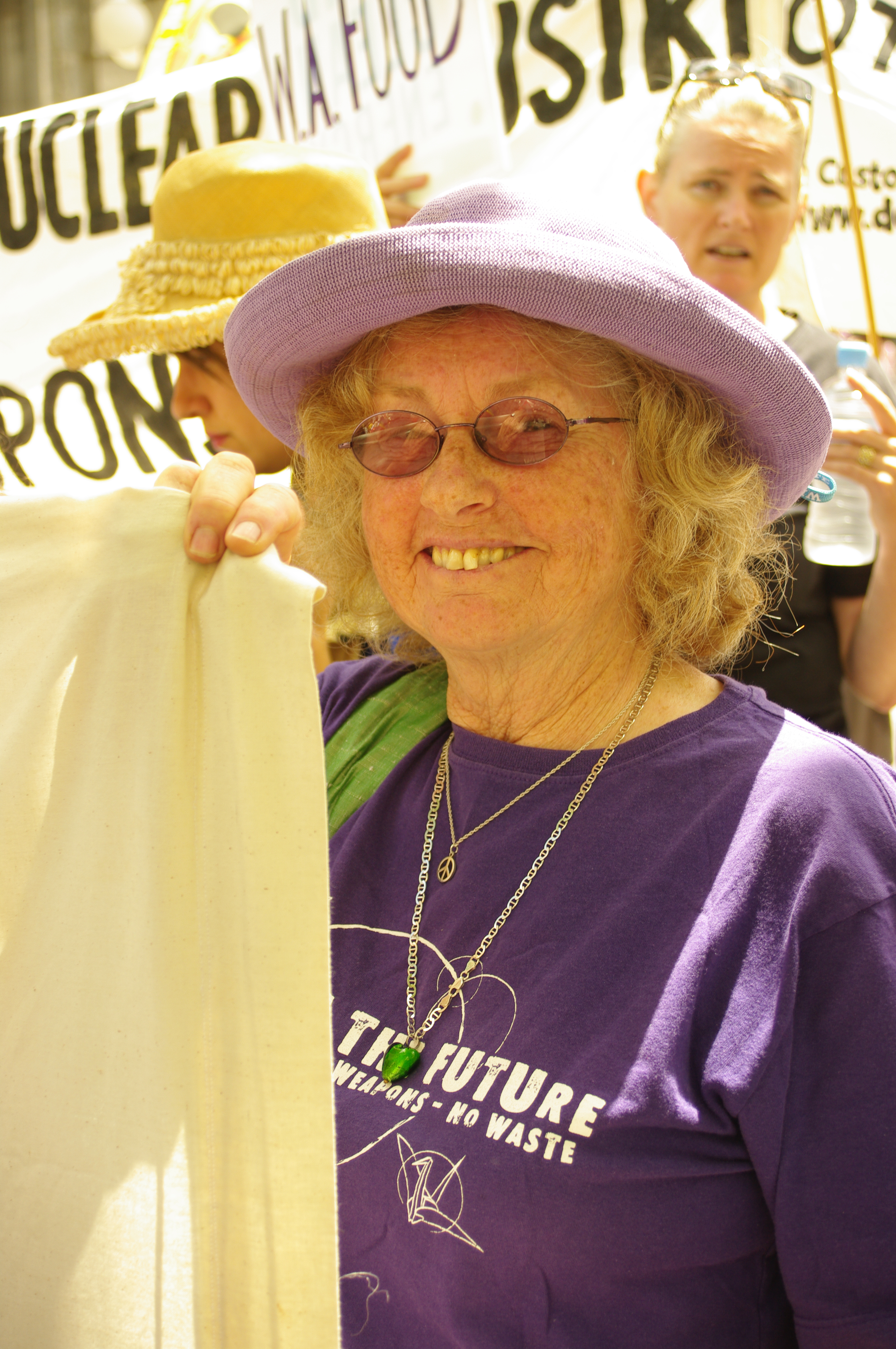
- Jo Vallentine in October 2011, protesting on the opening day of the Commonwealth Heads of Government Meeting 2011

Senator for Western Australia
- In office 1 July 1985 – 31 January 1992
- Preceded by: Jack Evans
- Succeeded by: Christabel Chamarette

Personal details
- Born: 30 May 1946 (age 80) Perth, Australia
- Party: NDP (1985); Independent (1985–90); Greens WA (1990–92)
- Relations: Mary Jo Fisher (niece)
- Occupation: Teacher

Josephine Vallentine (born 30 May 1946) is an Australian peace activist and politician, a former senator for Western Australia. She entered the Senate on 1 July 1985 after election as a member of the Nuclear Disarmament Party but sat as an independent and then as a member of the Greens Western Australia from 1 July 1990. She resigned on 31 January 1992.

== Personal life ==
Jo Vallentine grew up in Beverley, in Western Australia's Wheatbelt area. As a young woman she travelled to the United States and was moved to hear and meet Robert F. Kennedy.

Vallentine is a Quaker.

== Political career ==
In an interview in 2001 for a history of the WA peace movement she said: "The Quakers influenced me I suppose from the Vietnam Moratorium days because I was a teacher then, in 1967-69, when the marches were getting going in Perth, and I can remember being a bit nervous because in those days if you were seen in a protest you might have lost your job on Monday when you went to work."

At her first election campaign in 1984, media interest was focused on the NDP Senate candidate for New South Wales, Midnight Oil's singer Peter Garrett. However, under the Australian Senate's voting system of proportional representation, Western Australia was the only state to return an NDP senator.

Soon after her election, Jo Vallentine resigned from the NDP, held her Senate seat as an independent and was re-elected in the 1987 election. During her time in Parliament, Jo Vallentine continued her grassroots activism, and marched on the "Joint Facilities" base Pine Gap near Alice Springs. She was arrested and charged with trespassing, and spent time in jail after refusing to pay a fine. She also marched on the American Clark Air Base in the Philippines in 1989. In 1990, as the inaugural Greens WA Senate candidate, she was re-elected again but resigned on health grounds before completing her term. The casual vacancy was filled by Christabel Chamarette.

Her efforts took a toll. After resigning from the Senate, Vallentine took time to recuperate from ill health. By 1994 she was helping found Alternatives to Violence Project in Western Australia, focused on sharing nonviolent skills with people in prisons. She also travelled with the 1997 peace pilgrimage, was involved in the Jabiluka campaign, successfully campaigned to keep the estuary at Guilderton free from urban development on the south side of Moore River, and continues to oppose the 2003 Iraq War, the use of depleted uranium in Iraq (and its possible use by the US at Lancelin) and expansion of nuclear power and weapons.

She later participated in protests against Woodside's North West Shelf Project, and pled guilty to a charge of trespassing. She attempted to ask the court for a community service order, but received a fine.

== Legacy ==
In the late 1980s, Vallentine was interviewed by Caroline Jones on her Radio National program, The Search for Meaning.

In 2005 Vallentine was one of six Australian women nominated for the Nobel Peace Prize. In a survey of the state in 2006, the conservative The West Australian newspaper named Jo Vallentine as one of the state's 100 most influential people and in 2023 the same newspaper identified the 100 people who had shaped the state of Western Australia and they included politician and businessperson Carmen Lawrence, health activist Fiona Stanley, writer Sally Morgan, Dr Roberta Jull, women's leader Amy Jane Best and Valentine.

Former South Australian Liberal Senator Mary Jo Fisher is Vallentine's niece.

== See also ==
- List of peace activists
- Jean Melzer
- Michael Denborough
- Anti-nuclear movement in Australia

== Works ==
- Vallentine, Jo and Jones, Peter D. (1990) Quakers in politics : pragmatism or principle Alderley, Qld : The Religious Society of Friends, (James Backhouse Lecture #26) ISBN 0-909885-31-1
