= 1990 Australian federal election =

- 24 March 1990

All 148 seats in the House of Representatives 75 seats were needed for a majority in the House 40 (of the 76) seats in the Senate
- Registered: 10,728,435 ▲3.62%
- Turnout: 10,225,800 (95.31%) (▲1.47 pp)
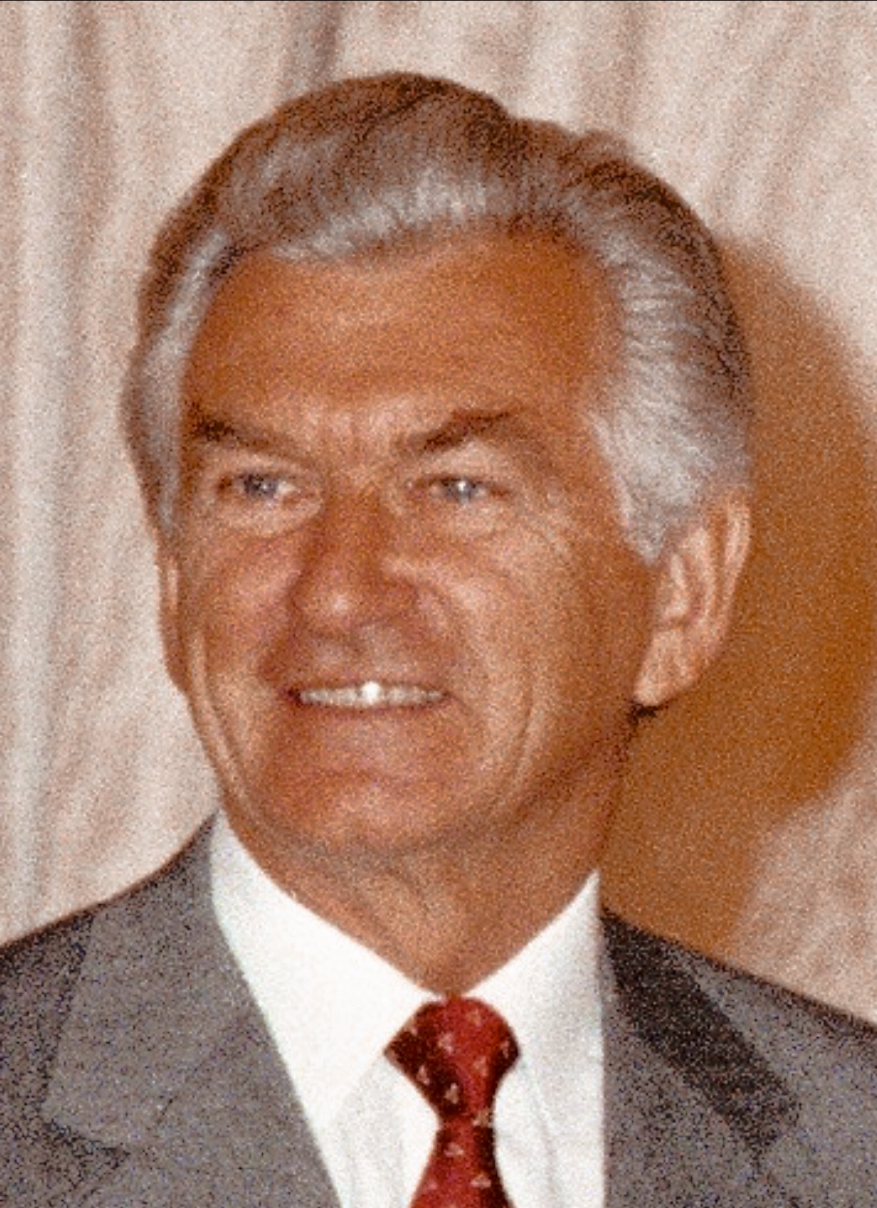

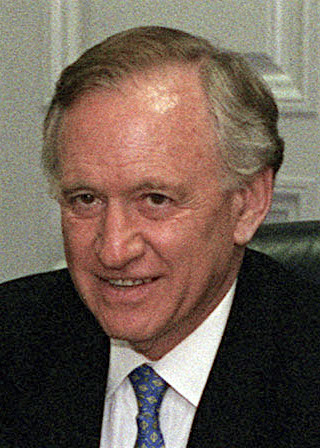
	First party	Second party
Leader	Bob Hawke	Andrew Peacock
Party	Labor	Coalition
Leader since	8 February 1983	9 May 1989
Leader's seat	Wills (Vic.)	Kooyong (Vic.)
Last election	86 seats	62 seats
Seats won	78 seats	69 seats
Seat change	▼8	▲7
First preference vote	3,904,138	4,302,127
Percentage	39.44%	43.46%
Swing	▼6.46%	▼2.44%
TPP	49.90%	50.10%
TPP swing	▼0.93	▲0.93
- Results by division for the House of Representatives, shaded by winning party's margin of victory.
Prime Minister before election
Bob Hawke
Labor
Subsequent Prime Minister
Bob Hawke
Labor

A federal election was held in Australia on 24 March 1990. All 148 seats in the House of Representatives and 40 seats in the 76-member Senate were up for election. The incumbent Australian Labor Party, led by Bob Hawke, defeated the opposition Liberal Party of Australia, led by Andrew Peacock, with its coalition partner, the National Party of Australia, led by Charles Blunt, despite losing the nationwide popular and two-party-preferred vote. The result saw the re-election of the Hawke government for a fourth successive term, the first time the ALP had won four consecutive terms. The election was also the most recent two Melburnians were leading the main parties.

== Background ==
After John Howard lost the 1987 election to Hawke, Andrew Peacock was elected Deputy Leader in a show of party unity. In May 1989, Peacock's supporters mounted a successful leadership challenge which returned Peacock to the leadership. Hawke's Treasurer, Keating, ridiculed Peacock by asking: "Can the soufflé rise twice?" and calling him, in reference to Peacock's name, "all feathers and no meat".

Hawke's government was in political trouble, with high interest rates and a financial crisis in Victoria. The controversy over the Multifunction Polis boiled over during the federal election campaign. Peacock declared that a future Coalition Government would abandon the project. He shared the Asian "enclave" fears of RSL president Alf Garland and others. The following day, The Australian newspaper ran a headline "Peacock a 'danger in the Lodge'".

In February 1990, the Liberal Party's deputy Senate leader Austin Lewis was sacked from shadow cabinet after suggesting Peacock would be removed as leader if the Coalition failed to win the election. Lewis's comments reportedly reignited leadership tensions within the Liberal Party and were influential in Hawke deciding to set an election date in March, two months before the last possible date for the election.

== Opinion polling ==
Date	Brand	Primary vote			
Date	Brand	ALP	L/NP	DEM	OTH
24 March 1990 election	N/A	39.44%	43.46	11.26%	5.83%
22 March 1990	Newspoll	41.5%	39.5%	14%	5%
4 March 1990	Newspoll	42%	39%	13%	6%
10 December 1989	Newspoll	44.5%	40%	9.5%	6%
27 March 1988	Newspoll	38%	48%	9%	5%
23 August 1987	Newspoll	49%	41%	8%	2%
18 July 1987 election	N/A	45.90%	45.90%	6.00%	2.18%

== Results ==
=== House of Representatives results ===
Government (78) Labor (78) Opposition (69) Coalition Liberal (55) National (14) Crossbench (1) Independent (1)

House of Reps (IRV) — 1990–93 — Turnout 95.32% (CV) — Informal 3.19%
Party	Votes	%	Swing	Seats	Change
Liberal	3,440,902	34.76	+0.44	55	▲12
National	833,557	8.42	–3.10	14	▼5
Country Liberal	27,668	0.28	+0.05	0	Steady
Liberal–National Coalition	4,302,127	43.46	–2.44	69	▲7
Labor	3,904,138	39.44	–6.46	78	▼8
Democrats	1,114,216	11.26	+5.26		
Greens (state-based) (Note: There was no federal Australian Greens party at this election. The Greens total includes Greens Western Australia (67,164), NSW Green Alliance (Note: At this election the Greens in New South Wales were a loose alliance largely organised by local groups, with 18 candidates running under a variety of names: Australian Gruen Party (Fowler, Macarthur, Mackellar, Macquarie, Prospect, St George, Throsby and Werriwa), the Greens (Phillip and Wentworth), Illawarra Greens (Cunningham and Hughes), Sydney Greens, South Sydney Greens (Kingsford Smith), Central Coast Green Party (Dobell and Robertson), Greens in Lowe and Cowper Greens.) (45,819), Queensland Greens (10,054), United Tasmania Group (6,367), Greens South Australia (1,878) and ACT Green Democratic Alliance (6,069).)	137,351	1.37			
Independents (Note: The independent member was Ted Mack (NSW). He was the first Independent since 1966 Sam Benson)	257,139	2.60	+0.94	1	▲1
Others	184,703	1.86	+1.67		
Total	9,899,674			148	
Two-party-preferred vote
Labor	4,930,837	49.90	−0.93	78	▼8
Liberal–National Coalition	4,950,072	50.10	+0.93	69	▲7
Invalid/blank votes	326,126	3.19	–1.75		
Turnout	10,225,800	95.32			
Registered voters	10,728,131				
Source: Federal Elections 1990

Popular vote
Labor	39.44%
Liberal	35.04%
Democrats	11.26%
National	8.42%
Independents	2.55%
Other	3.30%

Two-party-preferred vote
Coalition	50.10%
Labor	49.90%

Parliament seats
Labor	52.70%
Coalition	46.62%
Independents	0.68%

=== Senate results ===
Government (32) Labor (32) Opposition (34) Coalition Liberal (29) National (4) CLP (1) Crossbench (10) Democrats (8) WA Greens (1) Independent (1)

Senate (STV GV) — 1990–93 — Turnout 95.81% (CV) — Informal 3.40%
Party	Votes	%	Swing	Seats won	Seats held	Change
Liberal–National joint ticket	2,429,552	24.47	+10.71	5	N/A	N/A
Liberal	1,445,872	14.56	–6.41	12	29	▲2
National	258,164	2.60	−4.49	1	4	▼2
Country Liberal	29,045	0.29	+0.08	1	1	Steady
Liberal–National coalition	4,162,633	41.92	–0.12	19	34	Steady
Labor	3,813,547	38.41	−4.42	15	32	Steady
Democrats	1,253,807	12.63	+4.15	5	8	▲1
Greens (Note: The Greens total in the Senate includes Greens Western Australia (76,381 and elected one senator), NSW Green Alliance (64,583), Victorian Greens (23,420), Greens South Australia (19,499), United Tasmania Group (14,160), ACT Green Democratic Alliance (5,288), Greens New South Wales (4,826) and Australian Gruen (4,826).)	208,157	2.10	+1.66	1	1	▲1
Nuclear Disarmament (Note: The election of Nuclear Disarmament Senator Robert Wood was void. Irina Dunn was declared elected in his place but was expelled from the party and served out the remainder of her term as an independent.)	38,079	0.38	–0.71			▼1
Independents (Note: Jo Vallentine had been re-elected in 1987 as an independent however she joined the Greens for this election. The sitting independent was Brian Harradine.)	29,974	0.30	–1.59		1	▼1
Others	423,568	4.25	+2.07			
Total	9,929,765			40	76	
Invalid/blank votes	349,065	3.40	–0.64			
Turnout	10,728,830	95.81				
Registered voters	10,728,131					
Source: Federal Elections 1990

== Seats changing hands ==
Members listed in italics did not contest their seat at this election. Where redistributions occurred, the pre-1990 margin represents the redistributed margin.

Seat	Pre-1990			Swing	Post-1990		
Seat	Party	Member	Margin	Swing	Margin	Member	Party
Adelaide, SA	Liberal	Mike Pratt	6.5*	N/A	3.7	Bob Catley	Labor
Aston, Vic	Labor	John Saunderson	2.57	7.20	4.63	Peter Nugent	Liberal
Ballarat, Vic	Labor	John Mildren	2.12	4.00	1.88	Michael Ronaldson	Liberal
Bendigo, Vic	Labor	John Brumby	3.96	5.10	1.14	Bruce Reid	Liberal
Corinella, Vic	Labor	notional – new seat	5.27	6.00	0.73	Russell Broadbent	Liberal
Dunkley, Vic	Labor	Bob Chynoweth	5.60	6.80	1.20	Frank Ford	Liberal
Fairfax, Qld	National	Evan Adermann	7.34	N/A	7.47	Alex Somlyay	Liberal
Hawker, SA	Labor	Elizabeth Harvey	1.20	1.21	0.01	Chris Gallus	Liberal
Kennedy, Qld	National	Bob Katter	2.99	4.40	1.41	Rob Hulls	Labor
La Trobe, Vic	Labor	Peter Milton	4.25	5.60	1.35	Bob Charles	Liberal
McEwen, Vic	Labor	Peter Cleeland	2.89	6.10	3.21	Fran Bailey	Liberal
McMillan, Vic	Labor	Barry Cunningham	2.96	7.40	4.44	John Riggall	Liberal
Moreton, Qld	Liberal	Don Cameron	0.70	3.05	2.35	Garrie Gibson	Labor
North Sydney, NSW	Liberal	John Spender	4.23	N/A	7.66	Ted Mack	Independent
Page, NSW	National	Ian Robinson	4.51	5.19	0.68	Harry Woods	Labor
Richmond, NSW	National	Charles Blunt	6.59	7.09	0.50	Neville Newell	Labor

- The Liberal Party retained the seats of Isaacs (Vic) and Moore (WA), which were made notionally Liberal-held in the redistribution.
- Adelaide, SA, won by Labor at the previous election, was won by Liberal in a by-election. The margin listed above is the by-election margin.

== Outcome ==
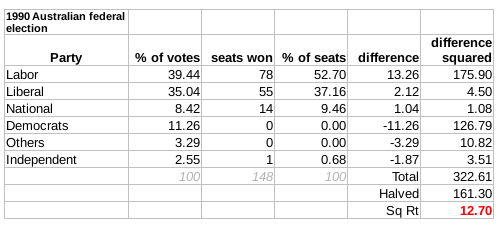
The Gallagher Index result: 12.7

The 1990 election resulted in a modest swing to the opposition Coalition. Though Labor had to contend with the late 80s/early 90s recession, they won a record fourth successive election and a record 10 years in government with Bob Hawke as leader, a level of political success not previously seen by federal Labor. The election was to be Hawke's last as Prime Minister and Labor leader, he was replaced by Paul Keating on 20 December 1991 who would go on to lead Labor to win a record fifth successive election and a record 13 years (to the day) in government resulting from the 1993 election.

At the election, the Coalition won a slim majority of the two-party vote, and slashed Labor's majority from 24 seats to nine, most of the gains made in Victoria. However, it only managed a two-party swing of 0.9 percent, which was not nearly enough to deliver the additional seven seats the Coalition needed to make Peacock Prime Minister. Despite having regained much of what the non-Labor forces had lost three years earlier, Peacock was forced to resign after the election.

This election saw the peak of the Australian Democrats' popularity under Janine Haines, and a WA Greens candidate won a seat in the Australian Senate for the first time – although the successful candidate, Jo Vallentine, was already a two-term senator, having previously won a seat for the Nuclear Disarmament Party at the 1984 election, and the Vallentine Peace Group at the 1987 election. Until 2010, this was the only post-war election where a third party (excluding splinter state parties and the Nationals) has won more than 10% of the primary vote for elections to the Australian House of Representatives.

It also saw the Nationals' leader, Charles Blunt, defeated in his own seat of Richmond by Labor challenger Neville Newell—only the second time that a major party leader had lost his own seat. Newell benefited from the presence of independent and anti-nuclear activist Helen Caldicott. Her preferences flowed overwhelmingly to Newell on the third count, allowing Newell to win despite having been second on the primary vote.

== See also ==
- Candidates of the Australian federal election, 1990
- Members of the Australian House of Representatives, 1990–1993
- Members of the Australian Senate, 1990–1993
