= 1996 Australian Senate election =

Australian federal election results

1996 Australian Senate elections
- 2 March 1996

40 of the 76 seats in the Australian Senate 39 seats needed for a majority
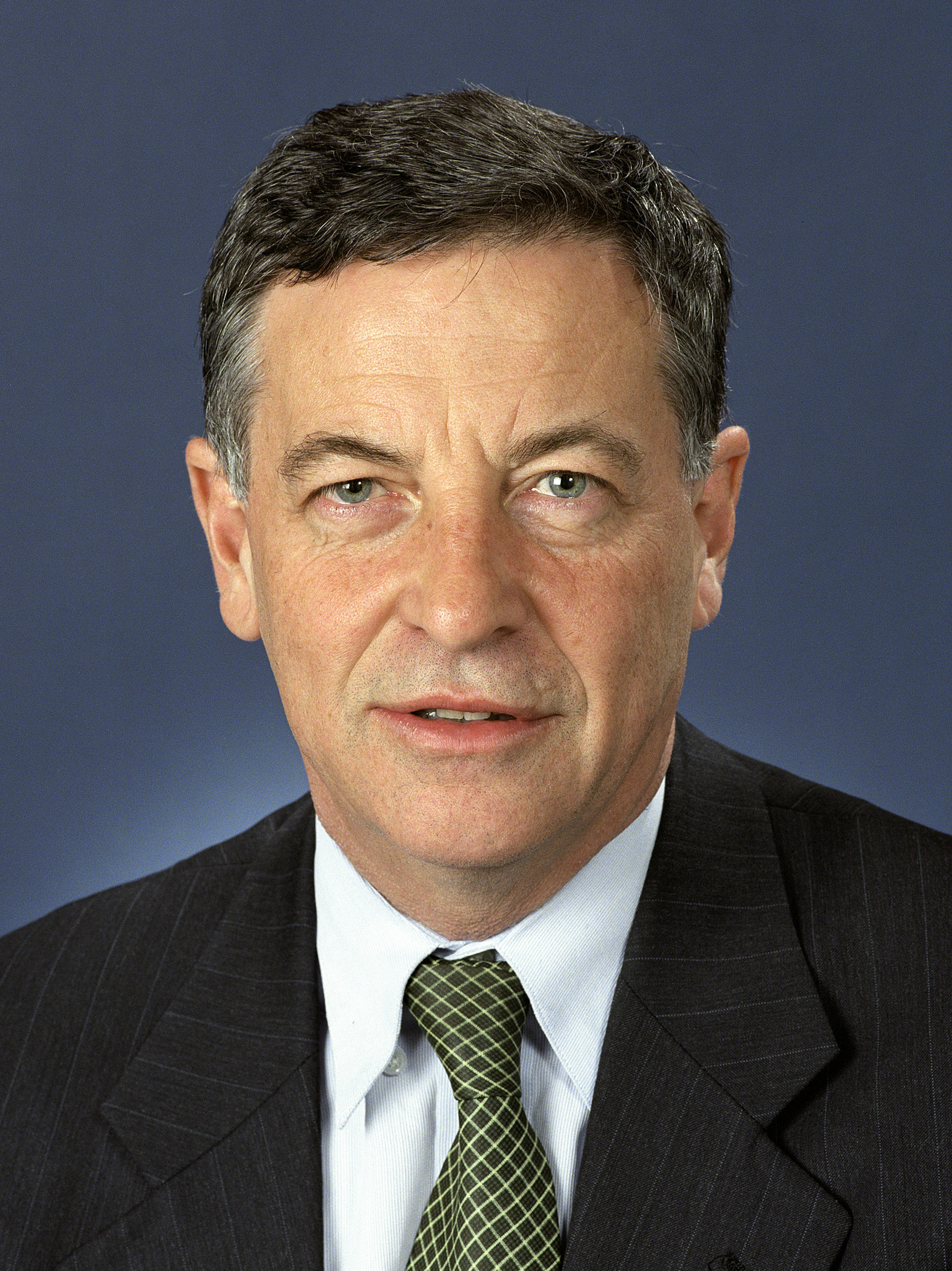

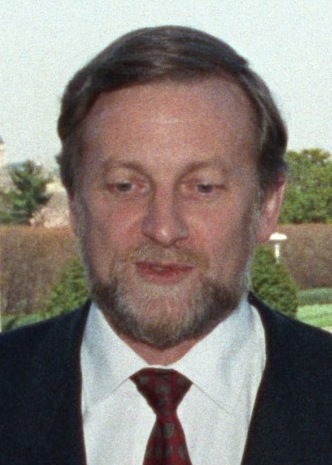

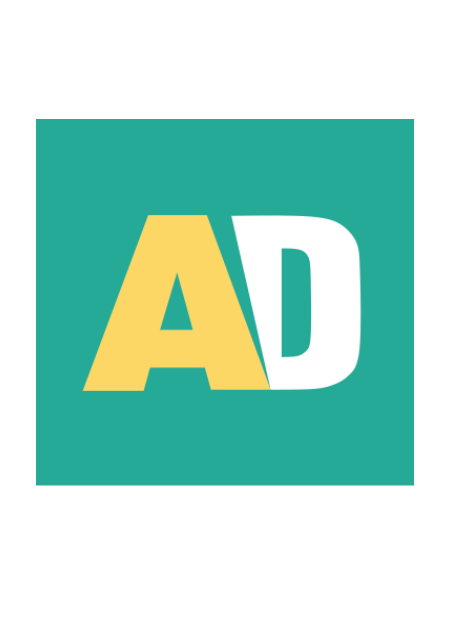

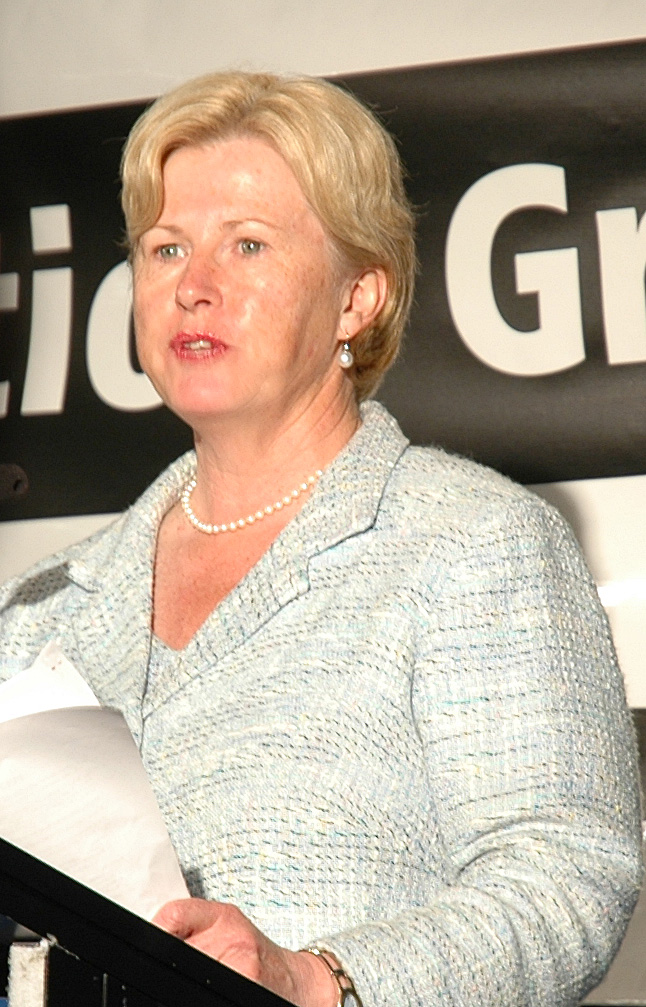

	First party	Second party	Third party
Leader	Robert Hill	Gareth Evans	Cheryl Kernot
Party	Liberal–National Coalition	Labor	Democrats
Leader since	3 April 1990	24 March 1993	23 April 1993
Leader's seat	South Australia	Victoria	Queensland
Seats before	36	30	7
Seats won	20	14	5
Seats after	37	29	7
Seat change	▲1	▼1	Steady
Popular vote	4,792,682	3,940,150	1,179,357
Percentage	43.97%	36.15%	10.82%
Swing	▲0.92%	▼7.35%	▲5.51%
	Fourth party	Fifth party	Sixth party
Leader	None	Christine Milne	Brian Harradine
Party	Greens WA	Tasmanian Greens	Brian Harradine Group
Leader's seat	None	Did not stand (Note: Milne did not contest the federal election; she was an incumbent member for Lyons in the Tasmanian House of Assembly.)	Tasmania
Seats before	2	0	1
Seats won	0	1	0
Seats after	1	1	1
Seat change	▼1	Steady	Steady
Popular vote	57,006	26,830	N/A (Note: The party did not contest the election as Harradine was not up for election.)
Percentage	0.52%	0.25%	N/A
Swing	▲0.67%	▲0.82%	N/A
- Senators elected in the 1996 federal election
Leader of the Senate before election
Gareth Evans
Labor
Elected Leader of the Senate
Robert Hill
Liberal/National coalition

The following tables show state-by-state results in the Australian Senate at the 1996 federal election. Senators total 35 coalition (31 Liberal, three coalition National, one CLP), 29 Labor, two Green, two non-coalition National, seven Democrats, and one Independent. Senator terms are six years (three for territories), and took their seats from 1 July 1996, except the territories who took their seats immediately.

== Australia ==
Senate (STV GV) — 1996–99 – Turnout 95.20% (CV) — Informal 3.89%
Group (Note: Parties and candidates may run together in one group, where group votes are allocated top-down within that group.)	First preferences			Seats			
Group	Votes	%	Swing	Seats won	Not up	New total	Change
Liberal–National coalition	4,792,682	43.97	+0.92	20	37	38	▲1
Liberal–National joint ticket	2,669,377	24.49	+0.09	4	4	8	Steady
Liberal–National joint ticket	2,669,377	24.49	+0.09	2	1	3	Steady
Liberal	1,770,486	16.24	+0.65	12	11	22	▲1
National	312,769	2.87	+0.15	1	1	2	Steady
Country Liberal	40,050	0.37	+0.04	1	0	1	Steady
Labor	3,940,150	36.15	−7.35	14	15	29	▼1
Democrats	1,179,357	10.82	+5.51	5	2	7	Steady
Greens (Note: Although the Australian Greens were formed in 1992, the Greens Western Australia and the Tasmanian Greens had not yet aligned with the federal party, Tasmania did following the election.)	345,513	3.17	+0.67	1	1	2	Steady
Australian Greens	261,677	2.40	+0.82	0	0	0	Steady
Tasmanian Greens	26,830	0.25	+0.05	1	0	1	▲1
AAFI	137,604	1.26	+0.82	0	0	0	Steady
Call to Australia	117,274	1.08	+0.06	0	0	0	Steady
Shooters	114,724	1.05	+0.45	0	0	0	Steady
Greens Western Australia (Note: Unlike the Tasmanian Greens, the Greens WA did not caucus with the Australian Greens following the election.)	57,006	0.52	+0.02	0	1	1	▼1
Women's Party	49,131	0.45	+0.45	0	0	0	Steady
Reclaim Australia	44,545	0.41	+0.41	0	0	0	Steady
Democratic Labor	36,156	0.33	−0.03	0	0	0	Steady
Better Future	18,960	0.17	+0.17	0	0	0	Steady
Natural Law	17,082	0.16	−0.20	0	0	0	Steady
No Aircraft Noise	17,043	0.16	−0.20	0	0	0	Steady
Grey Power	13,401	0.12	−0.04	0	0	0	Steady
Pensioner and CIR	9,040	0.08	−0.13	0	0	0	Steady
The Seniors	8,268	0.08	+0.08	0	0	0	Steady
Republican	7,778	0.07	−0.06	0	0	0	Steady
One Australia	3,638	0.03	+0.03	0	0	0	Steady
Indigenous Peoples	2,772	0.03	−0.03	0	0	0	Steady
Independent EFF	2,430	0.02	+0.02	0	0	0	Steady
Independents (Note: The independent senator was Brian Harradine (Tasmania).)	41,489	0.38	−1.99	0	1	1	Steady
Total	10,899,037			40	36	76	
Invalid/blank votes	395,442	3.5					
Turnout	11,294,479	96.2					
Registered voters	11,740,568						
Source: Federal Elections 1996

== New South Wales ==
Elected	#	Senator	Party
1996
1996	1	Bob Woods	Liberal
1996	2	Sue West	Labor
1996	3	David Brownhill	National
1996	4	Bruce Childs	Labor
1996	5	Helen Coonan	Liberal
1996	6	Vicki Bourne	Democrats
1993
1993	1	Michael Forshaw	Labor
1993	2	Michael Baume	Liberal
1993	3	John Faulkner	Labor
1993	4	John Tierney	Liberal
1993	5	Belinda Neal	Labor
1993	6	Sandy Macdonald	National

1996 Australian federal election: Senate: New South Wales
Party	Candidate	Votes	%	±%
Quota		526,041		
Coalition	1. Bob Woods (Lib) (elected 1); 2. David Brownhill (Nat) (elected 3); 3. Helen Coonan (Lib) (elected 5); 4. Abraham Constantin (Lib)	1,522,722	41.3	+2.4
Labor	1. Sue West (elected 2); 2. Bruce Childs (elected 4); 3. Tom Wheelwright; 4. Rima Barghout	1,370,918	37.2	−9.2
Democrats	1. Vicki Bourne (elected 6); 2. Arthur Chesterfield-Evans; 3. Andrew Larcos; 4. Troy Anderson	351,491	9.5	+4.6
Greens	1. Karla Sperling; 2. Peter Denton; 3. Jane Elix; 4. Murray Matson	85,004	2.3	+0.2
Shooters	1. Richard Sims; 2. Robyn Bourke; 3. Daniel Redfern; 4. Rodney Franich	74,032	2.0	+0.2
Call to Australia	1. Alasdair Webster; 2. Elaine Webster; 3. Graeme McLennan; 4. Bill Bird; 5. Bruce Coleman	72,969	2.0	+0.5
AAFI	1. John Phillips; 2. Bevan O'Regan	61,811	1.7	+1.0
Reclaim Australia	1. David Kitson; 2. Carolyn O'Callaghan	44,545	1.2	+1.2
ABFFOC	1. Teresa Findlay-Barnes; 2. David Tribe	18,960	0.5	+0.5
Women's Party	1. Darelle Duncan; 2. Sarah Thew	17,417	0.5	+0.5
No Aircraft Noise	1. Chris Nash; 2. Sylvia Hale	17,043	0.5	+0.5
The Seniors	1. Beryl Evans; 2. Lorraine Welsh	8,268	0.2	+0.2
Grey Power	1. John Verheyen; 2. Theo Hetterscheid; 3. Bob Segerstrom; 4. Olga Pickering	5,173	0.1	+0.1
Independent	Jade Hurley	4,765	0.1	+0.1
Natural Law	1. Catherine Knoles; 2. Ines Judd	3,702	0.1	−0.2
Group I	1. Robert Schollbach; 2. Amanda Stirling	3,632	0.1	+0.1
Republican	1. Peter Breen; 2. Kerry McNally; 3. Valerie Housego; 4. Assefa Bekele; 5. Antoinette Fahey	2,846	0.1	+0.1
Group K	1. Tony Galati; 2. Sam Galati	1,128	0.0	0.0
Group M	1. Robert Butler; 2. Lindsay Cosgrove	657	0.0	0.0
Independent	Morris Jones	485	0.0	0.0
Independent	Dian Underwood	433	0.0	0.0
Independent	Bill Bradley	383	0.0	0.0
Independent	Gretel Pinniger	382	0.0	0.0
Independent	Ray Patterson	295	0.0	0.0
Independent	Ivor F	210	0.0	0.0
Independent	John Barbara	57	0.0	0.0
Independent	David Piggin	31	0.0	0.0
Total formal votes		3,682,283	96.2	−1.1
Informal votes		143,388	3.8	+1.1
Turnout		3,825,671	96.7	+0.2

== Victoria ==
Elected	#	Senator	Party
1996
1996	1	Richard Alston	Liberal
1996	2	Robert Ray	Labor
1996	3	Rod Kemp	Liberal
1996	4	Barney Cooney	Labor
1996	5	Kay Patterson	Liberal
1996	6	Lyn Allison	Democrats
1993
1993	1	Stephen Conroy	Labor
1993	2	Jim Short	Liberal
1993	3	Kim Carr	Labor
1993	4	Julian McGauran	National
1993	5	Jacinta Collins	Labor
1993	6	Judith Troeth	Liberal

1996 Australian federal election: Senate, Victoria
Party	Candidate	Votes	%	±%
Quota		395,356		
Coalition	1. Richard Alston (Lib) (elected 1); 2. Rod Kemp (Lib) (elected 3); 3. Kay Patterson (Lib) (elected 5); 4. Robert Ettery (Nat); 5. Robyne Head (Lib); 6. Anthony Fernandez (Lib)	1,146,655	41.4	−2.7
Labor	1. Robert Ray (elected 2); 2. Barney Cooney (elected 4); 3. Julia Gillard; 4. Melanie Raymond	1,100,799	39.8	−5.2
Democrats	1. Lyn Allison (elected 6); 2. John McLaren; 3. Laurie Levy; 4. Marj White	300,848	10.9	+6.9
Greens	1. Peter Singer; 2. Karen Alexander; 3. Helen Lucas	81,273	2.9	+1.7
AAFI	1. Dennis McCormack; 2. Robyn Spencer	40,607	1.4	+1.4
Democratic Labour	1. John Mulholland; 2. Paul Cahill; 3. Michael Rowe; 4. Pat Crea; 5. Matthew Cody; 6. Christine Dodd	36,156	1.3	−0.1
Shooters	1. Colin Wood; 2. Neville Sayers; 3. Gary Fliegner	19,573	0.7	+0.7
Call to Australia	1. Ken Cook; 2. Christine Chapman	16,497	0.6	−0.1
Pensioner and CIR	1. Will Borzatti; 2. Neil McKay	9,040	0.3	−0.5
Natural Law	1. Stephen Griffith; 2. Ngaire Mason	6,681	0.2	−0.2
Independent	David Armstrong	3,321	0.1	+0.1
Republican	1. Paul Dahan; 2. Des Bergen	2,249	0.1	−0.1
Group J	1. Joe Toscano; 2. Steve Roper	2,038	0.1	+0.1
Independent	Stephen Raskovy	619	0.0	0.0
Independent	Maurice Smith	150	0.0	0.0
Independent	Michael Good	110	0.0	0.0
Independent	John Abbotto	96	0.0	0.0
Independent	Neil Green	75	0.0	0.0
Total formal votes		2,767,485	96.4	−0.5
Informal votes		101,789	3.6	+0.5
Turnout		2,869,274	96.5	−0.1

== Queensland ==
Elected	#	Senator	Party
1996
1996	1	Ian Macdonald	Liberal
1996	2	John Hogg	Labor
1996	3	Ron Boswell	National
1996	4	John Herron	Liberal
1996	5	Brenda Gibbs	Labor
1996	6	Cheryl Kernot	Democrats
1993
1993	1	Margaret Reynolds	Labor
1993	2	David MacGibbon	Liberal
1993	3	Bill O'Chee	National
1993	4	Mal Colston	Labor
1993	5	John Herron	Liberal
1993	6	John Woodley	Democrats

1996 Australian federal election: Senate, Queensland
Party	Candidate	Votes	%	±%
Quota		274,924		
Liberal	1. Ian Macdonald (elected 1); 2. John Herron (elected 4); 3. Debbie Kember	680,553	35.4	+3.9
Labor	1. John Hogg (elected 2); 2. Brenda Gibbs (elected 5); 3. Bernadette Callaghan	583,850	30.3	−9.1
National	1. Ron Boswell (elected 3); 2. Teresa Cobb; 3. Terry Cranwell	288,199	15.0	+0.5
Democrats	1. Cheryl Kernot (elected 6); 2. Tony Walters; 3. Peter Collins; 4. Annette Reed	254,219	13.2	+6.2
Greens	1. Angela Jones; 2. Desiree Mahoney; 3. Libby Connors	46,285	2.4	−0.8
AAFI	1. Cynthia Mayne; 2. John Minogue	13,117	0.7	+0.7
Women's Party	1. Mary Kelly; 2. Lizbeth Yuille; 3. Jenny Hughey	13,006	0.7	+0.7
Shooters	1. Peter Salisbury; 2. Bill Ison	12,146	0.6	+0.6
Call to Australia	1. Harry Cook; 2. Nan Cook	9,543	0.5	−0.1
Group G	1. J Freemarijuana; 2. Tony Kneipp	3,836	0.2	+0.2
Natural Law	1. Kris Ayyar; 2. John Price	3,656	0.2	0.0
One Australia	1. Perry Jewell; 2. Michael Grayson	3,638	0.2	+0.2
Group F	1. Phillip Young; 2. Harvie Ladlow	2,793	0.1	+0.1
Indigenous Peoples	1. Sam Watson; 2. Netta Tyson	2,772	0.1	+0.1
Republican	1. Brian Buckley; 2. David Bailey	2,683	0.1	+0.1
Group H	1. Ian McNiven; 2. Ray Smyth; 3. Robert Marks	1,909	0.1	+0.1
Group M	1. Maurice Hetherington; 2. Ross Russell	738	0.0	0.0
Group E	1. John Jones; 2. Lee Jones	613	0.0	0.0
Independent	Michelle Mac Nevin	594	0.0	0.0
Independent	Ross McKay	154	0.0	0.0
Independent	David Howse	91	0.0	0.0
Independent	Chris Leth	67	0.0	0.0
Total formal votes		1,924,462	96.7	−1.3
Informal votes		64,979	3.3	+1.3
Turnout		1,989,441	95.1	−0.7

== Western Australia ==
Elected	#	Senator	Party
1996
1996	1	Winston Crane	Liberal
1996	2	Jim McKiernan	Labor
1996	3	John Panizza	Liberal
1996	4	Mark Bishop	Labor
1996	5	Alan Eggleston	Liberal
1996	6	Andrew Murray	Democrats
1993
1993	1	Sue Knowles	Liberal
1993	2	Peter Cook	Labor
1993	3	Ian Campbell	Liberal
1993	4	Chris Evans	Labor
1993	5	Chris Ellison	Liberal
1993	6	Dee Margetts	Greens

1996 Australian federal election: Senate, Western Australia
Party	Candidate	Votes	%	±%
Quota		143,472		
Liberal	1. Winston Crane (elected 1); 2. John Panizza (elected 3); 3. Alan Eggleston (elected 5); 4. Michael Huston; 5. Enzo Sirna; 6. Clare Thompson	460,379	45.8	−2.6
Labor	1. Jim McKiernan elected 2); 2. Mark Bishop (elected 4); 3. Michael Beahan; 4. Catherine Crawford	341,580	34.1	−4.1
Democrats	1. Andrew Murray (elected 6); 2. Don Millar; 3. Shirley de la Hunty	93,937	9.4	+5.3
Greens	1. Christabel Chamarette; 2. Robin Chapple	57,006	5.7	+0.1
National	1. Kevin McAnuff; 2. Lynley Anderson	20,877	2.0	+0.3
AAFI	1. Richard Haye; 2. Robert Hammond	12,642	1.2	+1.2
Women's Party	1. Mattie Turnbull; 2. Kate Mudford	11,169	1.1	+1.1
Call to Australia	1. Don Jackson; 2. Marj Laurie	7,028	0.7	−0.5
Group C	1. Tony Drake; 2. Jean Robinson	1,518	0.1	+0.1
Independent	Craig Bradshaw	1,023	0.1	+0.1
Natural Law	Ros White	414	0.0	−0.3
Independent	Vin Cooper	376	0.0	0.0
Independent	Craig Mackintosh	346	0.0	0.0
Total formal votes		1,004,299	96.5	−1.4
Informal votes		36,369	3.5	+1.4
Turnout		1,040,668	95.6	−0.3

== South Australia ==
Elected	#	Senator	Party
1996
1996	1	Robert Hill	Liberal
1996	2	Rosemary Crowley	Labor
1996	3	Natasha Stott Despoja	Democrats
1996	4	Grant Chapman	Liberal
1996	5	Chris Schacht	Labor
1996	6	Jeannie Ferris	Liberal
1993
1993	1	Amanda Vanstone	Liberal
1993	2	Nick Bolkus	Labor
1993	3	Nick Minchin	Liberal
1993	4	Dominic Foreman	Labor
1993	5	Alan Ferguson	Liberal
1993	6	Meg Lees	Democrats

1996 Australian federal election: Senate, South Australia
Party	Candidate	Votes	%	±%
Quota		133,397		
Liberal	1. Robert Hill (elected 1); 2. Grant Chapman (elected 4); 3. Jeannie Ferris (elected 6); 4. Maria Kortesis	428,053	45.8	+0.1
Labor	1. Rosemary Crowley (elected 2); 2. Chris Schacht (elected 5); 3. Deirdre Tedmanson	301,094	32.2	−5.8
Democrats	1. Natasha Stott Despoja (elected 3); 2. Ian Gilfillan; 3. Judy Smith; 4. Desea Tsagatos	135,730	14.5	+4.7
Greens	1. Stephen Spence; 2. Meryl McDougall	19,441	2.0	+0.4
AAFI	1. Bert Joy; 2. Stephen Wikblom	9,424	1.0	+1.0
Shooters	1. Haydon Aldersey; 2. Robert Low	8,973	1.0	+1.0
Grey Power	1. Emily Gilbey-Riley; 2. Gratton Darbyshire	8,228	0.9	+0.9
Call to Australia	1. David Rodway; 2. Brett Rodway	6,817	0.7	−0.4
Group J	1. Kenneth Nicholson; 2. Colin Shearing	6,286	0.7	+0.7
Women's Party	1. Deborah McCulloch; 2. Marg McHugh; 3. Denise Tzumli	5,678	0.6	+0.6
Independent EFF	1. David Dwyer; 2. Alfred Walker	2,430	0.3	+0.3
Group F	1. Michael Wohltmann; 2. Jeanette Wohltmann	1,081	0.1	+0.1
Independent	Geoffrey Wells	561	0.1	+0.1
Total formal votes		933,776	96.7	−1.0
Informal votes		31,552	3.3	+1.0
Turnout		965,328	96.4	−0.9

== Tasmania ==
Elected	#	Senator	Party
1996
1996	1	Jocelyn Newman	Liberal
1996	2	Sue Mackay	Labor
1996	3	Paul Calvert	Liberal
1996	4	Nick Sherry	Labor
1996	5	John Watson	Liberal
1996	6	Bob Brown	Greens
1993
1993	1	Kay Denman	Labor
1993	2	Eric Abetz	Liberal
1993	3	John Coates	Labor
1993	4	Brian Gibson	Liberal
1993	5	Brian Harradine	Independent
1993	6	Shayne Murphy	Labor

1996 Australian federal election: Senate, Tasmania
Party	Candidate	Votes	%	±%
Quota		44,139		
Liberal	1. Jocelyn Newman (elected 1); 2. Paul Calvert (elected 3); 3. John Watson (elected 5)	130,552	42.2	+5.5
Labor	1. Sue Mackay (elected 2); 2. Nick Sherry (elected 4); 3. Charles Touber	120,678	39.1	−3.6
Greens	1. Bob Brown (elected 6); 2. Janet Dale	26,830	8.9	+2.0
Democrats	1. Robert Bell; 2. Julia Onsman; 3. Philip Tattersall	22,006	7.1	+5.5
National	1. Mary Jackson; 2. Jeff Clayton	3,554	1.2	+1.2
Women's Party	1. Claire Andersen; 2. Lin MacQueen	1,881	0.6	+0.6
Natural Law	1. Gregory Broszczyk; 2. James James Harlow	1,811	0.6	+0.6
Call to Australia	1. Don Rogers; 2. Beryl Rogers	1,519	0.5	+0.5
Total formal votes		308,970	96.8	−0.6
Informal votes		10,083	3.2	+0.6
Turnout		319,053	96.9	+0.3

== Australian Capital Territory ==
Elected	#	Senator	Party
1996
1996	1	Kate Lundy	Labor
1996	2	Margaret Reid	Liberal

1996 Australian federal election: Senate, Australian Capital Territory
Party	Candidate	Votes	%	±%
Quota		64,020		
Labor	1. Kate Lundy (elected 1); 2. Peter Conway	81,866	42.6	−6.0
Liberal	1. Margaret Reid (elected 2); 2. Stephe Jitts	74,949	39.0	+4.0
Democrats	1. Peter Main; 2. Brent Blackburn	19,590	10.2	+3.3
Greens	1. Deb Foskey; 2. Jonathan Millar	11,297	5.8	−0.2
Call to Australia	1. John Miller; 2. James Liaw	2,901	1.5	+1.5
Independent	Fred Skerbic	1,454	0.8	+0.8
Independent	Bill Monaghan	597	0.3	+0.3
Independent	Joanne Clarke	454	0.2	+0.2
Independent	David Seaton	146	0.1	+0.1
Total formal votes		192,057	97.5	−0.9
Informal votes		4,860	2.5	+0.9
Turnout		196,917	96.2	−0.9

== Northern Territory ==
Elected	#	Senator	Party
1996
1996	1	Grant Tambling	Liberal
1996	2	Bob Collins	Labor

1996 Australian federal election: Senate, Northern Territory
Party	Candidate	Votes	%	±%
Quota		28,569		
Country Liberal	1. Grant Tambling (elected 1); 2. Kym Cook	40,050	46.7	+2.0
Labor	1. Bob Collins (elected 2); 2. Susan Bradley	38,667	45.1	−10.2
Greens	1. Margie Friel; 2. Ilana Eldridge	5,453	6.4	+6.4
Democrats	Geoff Carr	1,535	1.8	+1.8
Total formal votes		85,705	97.2	0.0
Informal votes		2,422	2.8	0.0
Turnout		88,127	89.2	+0.2

== See also ==
- Candidates of the 1996 Australian federal election
- Members of the Australian Senate, 1996–1999
