= Candidates of the 1996 Australian federal election =

This article provides information on candidates who stood for the 1996 Australian federal election. The election was held on 2 March 1996.

== Redistributions and seat changes ==
- Redistributions of electoral boundaries occurred in Victoria, Queensland and the Australian Capital Territory.
  - In Victoria, the Labor-held seat of Corinella was abolished. The Liberal-held seats of Bruce and Isaacs became notionally Labor, while the Labor-held seats of Dunkley and McEwen became notionally Liberal.
    - The member for Corinella, Alan Griffin (Labor), contested Bruce.
    - Victorian Senator Gareth Evans (Labor) contested Holt.
  - In Queensland, the notionally Liberal seat of Longman was created. The Labor-held seat of Forde became notionally Liberal, and the National-held seat of Hinkler became notionally Labor.
  - In the Australian Capital Territory, the notionally Labor seat of Namadgi was created.
    - The member for Canberra, Brendan Smyth (Liberal), contested Namadgi.
    - ACT Senator Bob McMullan (Labor) contested Canberra.

== Retiring Members and Senators ==
=== Labor ===
- Michael Duffy MP (Holt, Vic)
- Wendy Fatin MP (Brand, WA)
- Eric Fitzgibbon MP (Hunter, NSW)
- Russ Gorman MP (Greenway, NSW)
- Alan Griffiths MP (Maribyrnong, Vic)
- Chris Haviland MP (Macarthur, NSW)
- Brian Howe MP (Batman, Vic)
- Ben Humphreys MP (Griffith, Qld)
- Jeannette McHugh MP (Grayndler, NSW)
- Gary Punch MP (Barton, NSW)
- David Simmons MP (Calare, NSW)
- Peter Staples MP (Jagajaga, Vic)
- Senator Bryant Burns (Qld)
- Senator Gerry Jones (Qld)

=== Liberal ===
- Ken Aldred MP (Deakin, Vic)
- David Connolly MP (Bradfield, NSW)
- Don Dobie MP (Cook, NSW)
- Steele Hall MP (Boothby, SA)
- Senator Baden Teague (SA)

=== National ===
- Ray Braithwaite MP (Dawson, Qld)
- Bruce Lloyd MP (Murray, Vic)

=== Democrats ===
- Senator Sid Spindler (Vic)

=== Independent ===
- Ted Mack MP (North Sydney, NSW)
- Senator Noel Crichton-Browne (WA) – elected as Liberal
- Senator John Devereux (Tas) – elected as Labor

== House of Representatives ==
Sitting members at the time of the election are shown in bold text. Successful candidates are highlighted in the relevant colour. Where there is possible confusion, an asterisk (*) is also used.

=== Australian Capital Territory ===
Electorate	Held by	Labor candidate	Liberal candidate	Greens candidate	Other candidates
Canberra	Labor	Bob McMullan	Gwen Wilcox	Gordon McAllister	Sue Bill (Ind); Maryan Chaplin (NLP); Jerzy Gray-Grzeszkiewicz (Ind)
Fraser	Labor	**John Langmore**	Cheryl Hill	Miko Kirschbaum	
Namadgi	Labor	Annette Ellis	**Brendan Smyth**	Shane Rattenbury	Derek Rosborough (Ind)

=== New South Wales ===
Electorate	Held by	Labor candidate	Coalition candidate	Democrats candidate	Greens candidate	CTA candidate	Other candidates
Banks	Labor	**Daryl Melham**	David Sparkes (Lib)	Alison Bailey			John Kayes (RARI); Don Thompson (Ind); Gregg West (AAFI)
Barton	Labor	Robert McClelland	Arthur Santorinios (Lib)	Craig Chung		Chris McLean	Safwan Nasser (Ind)
Bennelong	Liberal	Wendy Mahon	**John Howard** (Lib)	Suzanne Reddy	Jamie Parker		James Bernard (Ind); Tim Carr (NLP); John Dawson (Ind); Julien Droulers (Ind); Paul Kemp (AAFI); Robert Shaw (NAN)
Berowra	Liberal	Nola McCarroll	**Philip Ruddock** (Lib)	Simon Disney	Christopher Connolly		Mick Gallagher (Ind); Bill Scally (NLP); Steve van Wyk (AAFI)
Blaxland	Labor	**Paul Keating**	Nick Korovin (Lib)	Jeffrey Meikle		Melodie Rahme	Marc Aussie-Stone (Ind); Nick Beams (Ind); Michael Lavis (AAFI); Eric Lawrence (Ind); Peter Sayegh (Ind); Peter Smith (NLP)
Bradfield	Liberal	Alex Kemeny	Brendan Nelson (Lib)	Ann Barry	Richard Wright	Margaret Ratcliffe	Patrick Gallagher (Ind); Mark Toomey (NLP); Len Watkins (AAFI)
Calare	Labor	Rob Allen	Ray Fardell (Lib); Trevor Toole (Nat)	Peter Baker	Sharon Mullin	Bruce McLean	Peter Andren* (Ind); Richard Nolan (NLP)
Charlton	Labor	**Bob Brown**	Peter Craig (Lib)	Lyn Godfrey	Bernadette Brugman		Ron Franks (AAFI)
Chifley	Labor	**Roger Price**	Jenny Green (Lib)	Alec Fisher		Shirley Grigg	Louise Hargreaves (NLP); Andrew Owen (Ind)
Cook	Liberal	Mark McGrath	Stephen Mutch (Lib)	Terri Richardson			James McDonald (Ind); Janey Woodger (AAFI)
Cowper	National	Paul Sekfy	**Garry Nehl** (Nat)	Allan Quartly	Jillian Cranny		
Cunningham	Labor	**Stephen Martin**	Philip Williams (Lib)	Mark Chilton	Will Douglas	Robert O'Neill	Fred Misdom (NLP); Margaret Perrott (Ind); Paul Wilcock (Ind)
Dobell	Labor	**Michael Lee**	Doug Eaton (Lib)	True Martin		Graham Freemantle	Aldo Katalinic (Ind); Jeremy Pritchard (AAFI)
Eden-Monaro	Labor	**Jim Snow**	Gary Nairn (Lib)	Nora Endean	Robin Tennant-Wood	David Howes	Irene Brown (AAFI); Peter Fraser (NLP); Robyn Loydell (Ind)
Farrer	National	Lynda Summers	**Tim Fischer** (Nat)	John Clancy		John Everingham	Luke Downing (Ind); Peter Whitfield (Ind)
Fowler	Labor	**Ted Grace**	Stephen Cenatiempo (Lib)	Mark Stevens			Ken Malone (AAFI); Lucia van Oostveen (NLP)
Gilmore	Labor	**Peter Knott**	Joanna Gash (Lib)	Joanne McGrath	David Rothschild	Charles Chappell	Tom Dell (Ind); Rosemary Keighley (NLP)
Grayndler	Labor	Anthony Albanese	Morris Mansour (Lib)	David Mendelssohn	Jenny Ryde	Alex Sharah	Kate Butler (Ind); Kevin Butler (NAN); Tom Haynes (NLP); Ron Poulsen (Ind)
Greenway	Labor	Frank Mossfield	Vicki Burakowski (Lib)	Bill Clancy		Bob Bawden	John Bates (AAFI); J. S. Ryder (NLP)
Gwydir	National	John Curley	**John Anderson** (Nat)	Anne Graham			Jim Perrett (Ind)
Hughes	Labor	**Robert Tickner**	Danna Vale (Lib)	Robert Koppelhuber	Steve Allen	Christopher Derrick	Martha Halliday (Ind)
Hume	National	Tony Hewson	**John Sharp** (Nat)	Dave Cox	Kevin Watchirs		
Hunter	Labor	Joel Fitzgibbon	Michael Johnsen (Nat)	Rod Bennison	Jenny Vaughan		Bernard Burke (Ind)
Kingsford-Smith	Labor	**Laurie Brereton**	John Xenos (Lib)	Christopher Brieger	Jeremy Oxley		Yabu Bilyana (Ind); Suzi Haynes (NLP); Ted Marshall (Ind)
Lindsay	Labor	**Ross Free**	Jackie Kelly (Lib)	John Wilson	Lesley Edwards	Brian Grigg	Terry Cooksley (AAFI); Stephen Davidson (Ind)
Lowe	Labor	**Mary Easson**	Paul Zammit (Lib)	Noel Plumb	Doug Hine	Katie Wood	Dave Allen (Ind); Michelle Calvert (NAN); Bob Hughes (NLP); Max Lane (Ind); Peter Woods (Ind)
Lyne	National	John Weate	**Mark Vaile** (Nat)	Rodger Riach	Susie Russell		Marje Rowsell (AAFI)
Macarthur	Labor	Noel Lowry	John Fahey (Lib)	Peter Fraser	Vicki Kearney		Stephen Agius (Ind); Herb Bethune (Ind); Colleen Street (Ind); Janet Watkins (AAFI)
Mackellar	Liberal	Ross McLoughlin	**Bronwyn Bishop** (Lib)	Vicki Dimond	Chris Cairns	Rick Bristow	John Bridge (AAFI); Stephen Doric (NLP); Anne Ellis (Ind); Rodney Smith (RARI)
Macquarie	Labor	**Maggie Deahm**	Kerry Bartlett (Lib)	Jon Rickard	Carol Gaul	Heather Kraus	John McCall (Ind); Warwick Tyler (AAFI)
Mitchell	Liberal	Erica Lewis	**Alan Cadman** (Lib)	Colleen Krason			John Hutchinson (RARI); Tony Pettitt (AAFI); Penny Price (NLP)
Newcastle	Labor	**Allan Morris**	Ivan Welsh (Lib)	Barry Boettcher	Cathy Burgess		Kamala Emanuel (Ind)
New England	National	Herman Beyersdorf	**Ian Sinclair** (Nat)	Allan Caswell			Terry Larsen (Ind); Frances Letters (NLP)
North Sydney	Independent	Julie Owens	Joe Hockey (Lib)	Linda Wade	George Carter		Richard Tanner (Ind)
Page	Labor	**Harry Woods**	Ian Causley* (Nat); Anne Hunter (Lib)	James Page	Sue Higginson	Trevor Arthur	Al Oshlack (RCG)
Parkes	National	Barry Brebner	**Michael Cobb** (Nat)	Ken Graham			Edna Cook (Ind); Dianne Decker (AWP); Vivian Desmond (AAFI); David McLennan (NLP)
Parramatta	Labor	**Paul Elliott**	Ross Cameron (Lib)	Eduardo Avila		Dee Jonsson	Joseph Chidiac (Ind); John Cogger (NLP); Peter Krumins (AAFI); Heidi Scott (Ind)
Paterson	Labor	**Bob Horne**	Bob Baldwin (Lib)	Bob Symington	Jan Davis	Trevor Carrick	
Prospect	Labor	**Janice Crosio**	Ron Cameron (Lib)	Manny Poularas			Linda Cogger (NLP)
Reid	Labor	**Laurie Ferguson**	Lynne McDowell (Lib)	Alfie Giuliano			Catherine Doric (NLP)
Richmond	Labor	**Neville Newell**	Larry Anthony* (Nat); Keith Johnson (Lib)	Mindy Thorpe	Annette Coyle		Robert Corowa (RCG)
Riverina	National	Rob Colligan	**Noel Hicks** (Nat)	John Collins			Alistair Jones (Ind)
Robertson	Labor	**Frank Walker**	Jim Lloyd (Lib)	Andrew Penfold	Bryan Ellis		Valiant Leung (Ind); Roy Whaite (AAFI)
Shortland	Labor	**Peter Morris**	David Parker (Lib)	Kaye Westbury	Ian McKenzie		Terry Cook (Ind); Richard Hill (Ind)
Sydney	Labor	**Peter Baldwin**	Peter Fussell (Lib)	Paul Nederlof	Sue Stock	Janne Peterson	Wendy Bacon (NAN); Peter Bushby (Ind); Karen Fletcher (Ind); Michael Lippmann (NLP); Donald O'Halloran (Ind)
Throsby	Labor	**Colin Hollis**	Albert Galea (Lib)	Elizabeth Fisher	Les Robinson	Brian Hughes	
Warringah	Liberal	Julie Heraghty	**Tony Abbott** (Lib)	Wallace Logue	Karen Picken		Beth Eager (NLP); Ian Weatherlake (AAFI)
Watson	Labor	**Leo McLeay**	Bruce Larter (Lib)	Amelia Newman		Todd Rahme	
Wentworth	Liberal	Paul Pearce	**Andrew Thomson** (Lib)	Di Happ	Fiona McCrossin		Paddy Engelen (NLP); John Hooper (Ind); Rodney Marks (Ind); David Synnott (Ind)
Werriwa	Labor	**Mark Latham**	Andrew Thorn (Lib)	Emanuela Lang			Greg Josling (Ind); Vince Townsend (AAFI); James Whitehall (Ind); Edwin Woodger (RARI)

=== Northern Territory ===
Electorate	Held by	Labor candidate	CLP candidate	Greens candidate	Independent candidates
Northern Territory	Labor	**Warren Snowdon**	Nick Dondas	Philip Nitschke	Bernie Brian; Pamela Gardiner

=== Queensland ===
Electorate	Held by	Labor candidate	Coalition candidate	Democrats candidate	Greens candidate	Other candidates
Bowman	Labor	**Con Sciacca**	Andrea West (Lib)	Jenny van Rooyen	Tony Krajniw	Selina Reilly (AIP)
Brisbane	Labor	**Arch Bevis**	Jane Williamson (Lib)	Andrew Bartlett	Mark Taylor	Zanny Begg (Ind); Mark Brady (NLP); Jenny Dunn (AWP); Bob Leach (Ind); Rose Mather (AIP)
Capricornia	Labor	**Marjorie Henzell**	Paul Marek* (Nat); Mike Wilkinson (Lib)	Fay Lawrence	Bob Muir	Bevan Tull (AIP)
Dawson	National	Frank Gilbert	De-Anne Kelly* (Nat); Greg Williamson (Lib)	Kevin Paine		Tony Duckett (Ind); Len Watson (AIP)
Dickson	Labor	**Michael Lavarch**	John Saunders (Nat); Tony Smith* (Lib)	Tom Spencer	Kim Pantano	Geoffrey Atkinson (AIP); Peter Consandine (RPA); Rona Joyner (Ind); Theoron Toon (Ind); Geoff Wilson (NLP)
Fadden	Liberal	Ray Merlehan	**David Jull** (Lib)	Hetty Johnston	William Gabriel	Dulcie Bronsch (AIP)
Fairfax	Liberal	Peter Marconi	**Alex Somlyay** (Lib)	Elizabeth Oss-Emer	John Fitzgerald	Colin Hicks (AIP)
Fisher	Liberal	John Henderson	John Bjelke-Petersen (Nat); **Peter Slipper*** (Lib)	Alan Kerlin	Chris Gwin	Lorraine Barnes (Ind); Alex Bond (AIP); Gordon Earnshaw (Ind); Margaret Lazarenko (AAFI); Louise Peach (AWP)
Forde	Liberal	**Mary Crawford**	Garth Carey (Nat); Kay Elson* (Lib)	Xanthe Adams	Aaron Wise	Marshall Bell (AIP)
Griffith	Labor	Kevin Rudd	Graeme McDougall* (Lib); David Stone (Nat)	Iain Renton	Barry Wilson	Jeni Eastwood (AWP); Gary Holland (Ind); John Leslie (AIP); Coral Wynter (Ind)
Groom	Liberal	Neville Green	**Bill Taylor** (Lib)	Mark Carew	Sarah Moles	Ray Buckley (OAP); W. J. McCarthy (AIP); Peter Ousby (Ind)
Herbert	Labor	**Ted Lindsay**	Ken Kipping (Nat); Peter Lindsay* (Lib)	Colin Edwards		Alex Caldwell (Ind); Josephine Sailor (AWP); David Smallwood (Ind)
Hinkler	Labor	Brian Courtice	**Paul Neville** (Nat)	Taha Dabbagh		Colin Johnson (AIP); Adrian Soeterboek (Ind)
Kennedy	National	Fay Donovan	**Bob Katter** (Nat)	Col Parker	Jo Valentine	Clarence Walden (AIP)
Leichhardt	Labor	**Peter Dodd**	Bob Burgess (Nat); Warren Entsch* (Lib)	Leonie Watson	Pat Daly	Steve Dimitriou (Ind); Margaret Leviston (NLP); Jeanette Singleton (AIP)
Lilley	Labor	**Wayne Swan**	Elizabeth Grace (Lib)	Michael Hipwood	Noel Clothier	Gloria Beckett (AIP); Daryl Bertwistle (Ind)
Longman	Liberal	Pat Bonnice	Thomas Bradley (Nat); Mal Brough* (Lib)	Greg Hollis	Jim Dimo	Geoffrey Abnett (OAP); Norman Hegarty (AIP); Terence Madden (Ind)
McPherson	Liberal	Margaret Andrews	**John Bradford** (Lib)	Melinda Norman-Hicks	Anja Light	David Dillon (AIP); Kevin Goodwin (Ind)
Maranoa	National	Bob Murray	**Bruce Scott** (Nat)	Alan May		Franklin Beatty (AIP)
Moncrieff	Liberal	Mike Smith	**Kathy Sullivan** (Lib)	Noel Payne	Inge Light	Matthew Mackechnie (CTA); Ian Pilgrim (AIP); Andrew Prenzler (Ind); Sandy Price (NLP)
Moreton	Labor	**Garrie Gibson**	Gary Hardgrave (Lib)	Kirsten Kirk	Annette Wilson	Cameron Armstrong (Ind); Keith Bremner (AAFI); Shane Dean (Ind); Wendy Dent (Ind); Jacqueline Dhanji-Ayyar (NLP); Norman Johnston (AIP)
Oxley	Labor	**Les Scott**	Pauline Hanson (Lib) (Note: Pauline Hanson had been disendorsed as the Liberal candidate and ran as an independent, but she remained a Liberal on the ballot paper.)	David Pullen	John McKeon	Bill Chapman (AIP); Victor Robb (Ind); Carl Wyles (Ind)
Petrie	Labor	**Gary Johns**	Teresa Gambaro (Lib)	Zillah Jackson	Dell Jones	Kerry Hay (Ind); Keryn Jackson (AIP); Nat Karmichael (Ind); Leonard Matthews (Ind); John Phillips (Ind)
Rankin	Labor	**David Beddall**	Amanda Scott (Lib)	Alan Dickson	Richard Nielsen	Rosemary Bell (AIP); Xuan Thu Nguyen (Ind)
Ryan	Liberal	Howard Nielsen	**John Moore** (Lib)	Diane Watson	Willy Bach	Cheryl Cannon (AIP); Alan Skyring (Ind); Valerie Thurlow (NLP)
Wide Bay	National	Alan Holmes	**Warren Truss** (Nat)	Pamela South		John Francis (Ind); Wayne Skilton (OAP); Charlie Watson (AIP)

=== South Australia ===
Electorate	Held by	Labor candidate	Liberal candidate	Democrats candidate	Greens candidate	Other candidates
Adelaide	Liberal	Gail Gago	**Trish Worth**	Mark Andrews	Tim Graham	David Bidstrup (Ind); Dan Carey (Ind); Peter Fenwick (NLP); Barbara Fraser (GP); Jane Manifold (Ind)
Barker	Liberal	Leah York	**Ian McLachlan**	Dennis Dorney	Rita Helling	Chris Wells (NLP)
Bonython	Labor	**Martyn Evans**	Chris Bodinar	Chris Kennedy	Maya O'Leary	Michael Brander (Ind)
Boothby	Liberal	Jeremy Gaynor	Andrew Southcott	Janet Martin	Mark Parnell	Bevan Morris (NLP)
Grey	Liberal	Denis Crisp	**Barry Wakelin**	Martin Jackson	Julia Tymukas	
Hindmarsh	Liberal	David Abfalter	**Chris Gallus**	Pat Macaskill	Matt Fisher	Heather Lorenzon (NLP); Andrew Phillips (Ind); Melanie Sjoberg (Ind)
Kingston	Labor	**Gordon Bilney**	Susan Jeanes	Debbie Webb	David Nurton	Bob Campbell (Ind); Sally Ann Hunter (NLP); Evonne Moore (AAFI); Patrick Muldowney (Ind); Paula Newell (Ind); John Watson (Ind)
Makin	Labor	**Peter Duncan**	Trish Draper	Tony Hill	Henri Mueller	Tony Baker (Ind); Barry Illert (Ind); Mary Newcombe (Ind); Andrew Scott (NLP)
Mayo	Liberal	Peter Louca	**Alexander Downer**	Cathi Tucker-Lee	David Mussared	Anthony Coombe (NLP); Graham Craig (Ind)
Port Adelaide	Labor	**Rod Sawford**	Rick Hill	Maddalena Rositano	George Apap	Enid Mohylenko (NLP)
Sturt	Liberal	George Vanco	**Christopher Pyne**	Keith Oehme	Craig Wilkins	Vladimir Lorenzon (NLP)
Wakefield	Liberal	Mike Stevens	**Neil Andrew**	Pam Kelly	Paul Petit	Eugene Rooney (GP)

=== Tasmania ===
Electorate	Held by	Labor candidate	Liberal candidate	Democrats candidate	Greens candidate	Other candidates
Bass	Labor	**Silvia Smith**	Warwick Smith	Debbie Butler	Kristina Nicklason	
Braddon	Liberal	Sid Sidebottom	**Chris Miles**	Chris Ivory	Clare Thompson	
Denison	Labor	**Duncan Kerr**	Ingrid Wren	Rachel Dudgeon	Karen Weldrick	Sarah Stephen (Ind)
Franklin	Labor	**Harry Quick**	Les Glover	Irene Fisher	John Hale	Kim Peart (Ind)
Lyons	Labor	**Dick Adams**	Russell Anderson	Duncan Mills	Debra Manskey	Leigh de la Motte (Nat)

=== Victoria ===
Electorate	Held by	Labor candidate	Coalition candidate	Democrats candidate	Greens candidate	Other candidates
Aston	Liberal	Michael Hailey	**Peter Nugent** (Lib)	Damian Wise		James McCarron (NLP)
Ballarat	Liberal	Jenny Beacham	**Michael Ronaldson** (Lib)	Trish Finlay		David Cocking (CTA); Alan Gray (Ind); Alan McDonald (NLP); John Neenan (AAFI)
Batman	Labor	Martin Ferguson	Wayne Youlten (Lib)	Julie Peterse	Frank Ryan	Irene Bolger (Ind); Paul D'Angelo (NLP); George Koumantatakis (Ind); Arthur Preketes (Ind)
Bendigo	Liberal	Joe Helper	**Bruce Reid** (Lib)	Don Semmens	Doug Ralph	John Bulbrook (AAFI); Susan Griffith (NLP); Pamela Taylor (CTA)
Bruce	Labor	**Alan Griffin**	**Julian Beale** (Lib)	Daryl Burkett	Armen Bahlaw	Michael Soos (NLP)
Burke	Labor	**Neil O'Keefe**	Anthony Moore (Lib)	Victor Kaye		Michael Dickins (NLP)
Calwell	Labor	**Andrew Theophanous**	Bill Willis (Lib)	Robert Livesay		Richard Barnes (NLP); Sue Phillips (Ind)
Casey	Liberal	Des Burns	**Bob Halverson** (Lib)	Glen Maddock	Chanel Keane	Robert Kendi (NLP); Basil Smith (CIR)
Chisholm	Liberal	Tony Robinson	**Michael Wooldridge** (Lib)	Matthew Townsend	Adrian Whitehead	Graeme Browne (NLP); Mark Ilott (Ind); Peter Judge (AAFI)
Corangamite	Liberal	Bernie Eades	**Stewart McArthur** (Lib)	Pamela Johnson		
Corio	Labor	**Gavan O'Connor**	Srechko Kontelj (Lib)	Gerald Desmarais		Robert Nieuwenhuis (NLP)
Deakin	Liberal	Kerrin Buckney	Phil Barresi (Lib)	John Siddons	Kathy Lothian	Gilbert Boffa (Ind); Paul Coelli (AAFI); Murray Graham (CTA); Maggie Lawrence (NLP); David White (Ind)
Dunkley	Liberal	**Bob Chynoweth**	Bruce Billson (Lib)	Reba Jacobs	Paul Higgins	Bev Nelson (NLP); Travis Peak (AAFI)
Flinders	Liberal	Ian Watkinson	**Peter Reith** (Lib)	Colin Beeforth	Ian Ward	Jan Charlwood (NLP); Ralph Roberts (Ind)
Gellibrand	Labor	**Ralph Willis**	John Best (Lib)	Khiet Nguyen	Janet Rice	Marco Andreacchio (NLP); John Kelly (Ind); Peter Sanko (CTA); Luke Spencer (AAFI)
Gippsland	National	Judith Stone	**Peter McGauran** (Nat)	John Browstein		Ben Buckley (Ind); Jamie Pollock (NLP)
Goldstein	Liberal	Kip Calvert	**David Kemp** (Lib)	Diane Barry	Justin Kennedy	Robert Johnson (NLP)
Higgins	Liberal	Ilias Grivas	**Peter Costello** (Lib)	Nicolle Kuna	Mark Nicholls	Lorna Scurfield (NLP)
Holt	Labor	Gareth Evans	Tony Williams (Lib)	Jim Aubrey		Heath Allison (NLP); Paul Madigan (AAFI); Liz Mantell (Ind); George Mitsou (Ind)
Hotham	Labor	**Simon Crean**	Brad Maunsell (Lib)	Brad Starkie	Emma Rush	John Casley (AAFI); John Cordon (NLP)
Indi	Liberal	Zuvele Leschen	**Lou Lieberman** (Lib)	Kevin Smith		Bruce Lusher (NLP)
Isaacs	Labor	Greg Wilton	**Rod Atkinson** (Lib)	Kaylyn Raynor		Jan Allison (NLP); Angela Walker (AAFI)
Jagajaga	Labor	Jenny Macklin	Michelle Penson (Lib)	Timothy Newhouse	Susan Coleman	Andrew Mackenzie (Ind); Byron Rigby (NLP); Paul Tobias (AAFI); Chris Vassis (Ind)
Kooyong	Liberal	Christina Sindt	**Petro Georgiou** (Lib)	Pierre Harcourt	Jane Beer	Raymond Schlager (NLP); Rod Spencer (AAFI)
Lalor	Labor	**Barry Jones**	Chris Macgregor (Lib)	Leigh Hebbard		Juliana Kendi (NLP)
La Trobe	Liberal	Carolyn Hirsh	**Bob Charles** (Lib)	John Hastie	John Benton	Frank Dean (Ind); Andrew Stenberg (NLP); Wolf Voigt (CTA)
McEwen	Liberal	**Peter Cleeland**	Fran Bailey (Lib)	David Zemdegs	Chris James	Jock Kyme (Ind); Rick Lloyd (AAFI); Martin Magee (NLP)
McMillan	Labor	**Barry Cunningham**	Russell Broadbent* (Lib); Helen Hoppner (Nat)	Colin Thornby	Luke van der Muelen	Norman Baker (CTA); Chris King (Ind); Michael Pollock (NLP); Dave Smith (Ind)
Mallee	National	Col Palmer	**John Forrest** (Nat)	Colin Davies		Andrew Lawson Kerr (NLP)
Maribyrnong	Labor	Bob Sercombe	Georgi Stickels (Lib)	Peter Rechner		Brendan Griffin (Ind); Peter Jackson (NLP); Helen van den Berg (Ind)
Melbourne	Labor	**Lindsay Tanner**	Michael Flynn (Lib)	Richard Grummet	Sarah Nicholson	Larry Clarke (NLP); James Ferrari (Ind); Di Quin (Ind)
Melbourne Ports	Labor	**Clyde Holding**	Margot Foster (Lib)	John Davey	Misha Coleman	Robert Brown (NLP); Margaret Gillespie-Jones (AAFI)
Menzies	Liberal	Peter de Angelis	**Kevin Andrews** (Lib)	Angela Carter		Susan Brown (NLP)
Murray	National	Bernie Moran	Sharman Stone* (Lib); John Walker (Nat)	Dennis Lacey		George Rose (NLP)
Scullin	Labor	**Harry Jenkins**	Marc Morgan (Lib)	Evan Bekiaris	Gurm Sekhon	Neil Phillips (NLP)
Wannon	Liberal	Richard Morrow	**David Hawker** (Lib)	Maggie Lindop		
Wills	Labor	Kelvin Thomson	Jack Minas (Lib)	Robert Stone		**Phil Cleary** (Ind); Craig Isherwood (Ind); Sharon Keppel (Ind); Martin Richardson (NLP)

=== Western Australia ===
Electorate	Held by	Labor candidate	Liberal candidate	Democrats candidate	Greens candidate	Other candidates
Brand	Labor	**Kim Beazley**	Penny Hearne	Mal McKercher	Bob Goodale	Leone Anderson (Ind); Clive Galletly (Ind); Alan Gent (Ind); Brian McCarthy (Ind); Phil Rebe (AAFI); Malcolm Walton (Nat)
Canning	Labor	**George Gear**	Ricky Johnston	Anthony Bloomer	Chris Twomey	Michael Devereux (Ind); Patti Roberts (NLP)
Cowan	Liberal	Carolyn Jakobsen	**Richard Evans**	Sue Coyne	Otto Dik	
Curtin	Liberal	Steven Roebuck	Ken Court	Michael Barrett	Giz Watson	George Kailis (NLP); **Allan Rocher*** (Ind)
Forrest	Liberal	Ann Mills	**Geoff Prosser**	Ronald Hellyer	Basil Schur	Alexander Marsden (Ind)
Fremantle	Labor	**Carmen Lawrence**	Mick Tiller	Joe Guentner	Alison de Garis	
Kalgoorlie	Labor	Ian Taylor	Cedric Wyatt	David Thackrah	Deborah Botica	**Graeme Campbell*** (Ind)
Moore	Liberal	Alistair Jones	Paul Stevenage	Sarah Gilfillan	Bill Franssen	**Paul Filing*** (Ind); Vicki Hancock (Ind)
O'Connor	Liberal	Mick Cole	**Wilson Tuckey**	Neil Munro	John Hemsley	Kevin Altham (Nat); Stephan Gyorgy (Ind)
Pearce	Liberal	Paul Andrews	**Judi Moylan**	Julie Ward	Robert Barnacle	
Perth	Labor	**Stephen Smith**	Dee Kelly	Jim Kerr	Elena Jeffreys	Anthony Benbow (Ind); Raymond Conder (Ind); Gary Nelson (NLP)
Stirling	Liberal	Kareen Carberry	**Eoin Cameron**	Lawrence Wapnah	Kim Herbert	Cathryn D'Cruz (NLP)
Swan	Labor	Jane Saunders	Don Randall	Norm Kelly	Mingli Wanjurri-Nungala	Elspeth Clairs (NLP); Bryan Hilbert (Ind); John Tucak (Ind)
Tangney	Liberal	Dermot Buckley	**Daryl Williams**	Ilse Trewin	Margaret Jenkins	Ken Barrett (NLP)

== Senate ==
Sitting Senators are shown in bold text. Tickets that elected at least one Senator are highlighted in the relevant colour. Successful candidates are identified by an asterisk (*).

=== Australian Capital Territory ===
Two seats were up for election. The Labor Party was defending one seat. The Liberal Party was defending one seat.

Labor candidates	Liberal candidates	Democrats candidates	Greens candidates	CTA candidates	Ungrouped candidates
1. Kate Lundy*; 2. Peter Conway	1. **Margaret Reid***; 2. Stephe Jitts	1. Peter Main; 2. Brent Blackburn	1. Deb Foskey; 2. Jonathan Millar	1. John Miller; 2. James Liaw	Joanne Clark; Bill Monaghan; David Seaton; Fred Skerbic

=== New South Wales ===
Six seats were up for election. The Labor Party was defending three seats. The Liberal-National Coalition was defending two seats. The Australian Democrats were defending one seat. Senators Michael Baume (Liberal), John Faulkner (Labor), Michael Forshaw (Labor), Sandy Macdonald (National), Belinda Neal (Labor) and John Tierney (Liberal) were not up for re-election.

Labor candidates	Coalition candidates	Democrats candidates	Greens candidates	CTA candidates
1. **Sue West***; 2. **Bruce Childs***; 3. **Tom Wheelwright**; 4. Rima Barghout	1. **Bob Woods*** (Lib); 2. **David Brownhill*** (Nat); 3. Helen Coonan* (Lib); 4. Abraham Constantin (Lib)	1. **Vicki Bourne***; 2. Arthur Chesterfield-Evans; 3. Andrew Larcos; 4. Troy Anderson	1. Karla Sperling; 2. Peter Denton; 3. Jane Elix; 4. Murray Matson	1. Alasdair Webster; 2. Elaine Webster; 3. Graeme McLennan; 4. Bill Bird; 5. Bruce Coleman
AAFI candidates	Shooters candidates	Women's candidates	NLP candidates	Grey Power candidates
1. John Phillips; 2. Bevan O'Regan	1. Richard Sims; 2. Robyn Bourke; 3. Daniel Redfern; 4. Rodney Franich	1. Darelle Duncan; 2. Sarah Thew	1. Catherine Knoles; 2. Ines Judd	1. John Verheyen; 2. Theo Hetterscheid; 3. Bob Segerstrom; 4. Olga Pickering
No Aircraft Noise candidates	Better Future candidates	RARI candidates	BoR/Republican candidates	The Seniors candidates
1. Chris Nash; 2. Sylvia Hale	1. Teresa Findlay-Barnes; 2. David Tribe	1. David Kitson; 2. Carolyn O'Callaghan	1. Peter Breen (ABR); 2. Kerry McNally (RPA); 3. Valerie Housego (ABR); 4. Assefa Bekele (ABR); 5. Antoinette Fahey (ABR)	1. Beryl Evans; 2. Lorraine Welsh
Group I candidates	Group K candidates	Group M candidates	Ungrouped candidates	
1. Robert Schollbach; 2. Amanda Stirling	1. Tony Galati; 2. Sam Galati	1. Robert Butler; 2. Lindsay Cosgrove	Morris Jones; F Ivor; John Barbara; Jade Hurley; Gretel Pinniger	Dian Underwood; Ray Patterson; David Piggin; Bill Bradley

=== Northern Territory ===
Two seats were up for election. The Labor Party was defending one seat. The Country Liberal Party was defending one seat.

Labor candidates	CLP candidates	Greens candidates	Ungrouped candidates
1. **Bob Collins***; 2. Susan Bradley	1. **Grant Tambling***; 2. Kym Cook	1. Margie Friel; 2. Ilana Eldridge	Geoff Carr (Dem)

=== Queensland ===
Six seats were up for election. The Labor Party was defending two seats. The Liberal Party was defending two seats. The National Party was defending one seat. The Australian Democrats were defending one seat. Senators Mal Colston (Labor), David MacGibbon (Liberal), Bill O'Chee (National), Warwick Parer (Liberal), Margaret Reynolds (Labor) and John Woodley (Democrats) were not up for re-election.

Labor candidates	Liberal candidates	National candidates	Democrats candidates	Greens candidates
1. John Hogg*; 2. Brenda Gibbs*; 3. Bernadette Callaghan	1. **Ian Macdonald***; 2. **John Herron***; 3. Debbie Kember	1. **Ron Boswell***; 2. Teresa Cobb; 3. Terry Cranwell	1. **Cheryl Kernot***; 2. Tony Walters; 3. Peter Collins; 4. Annette Reed	1. Angela Jones; 2. Desiree Mahoney; 3. Libby Connors
CTA candidates	AAFI candidates	Shooters candidates	Women's candidates	NLP candidates
1. Harry Cook; 2. Nan Cook	1. Cynthia Mayne; 2. John Minogue	1. Peter Salisbury; 2. Bill Ison	1. Mary Kelly; 2. Lizbeth Yuille; 3. Jenny Hughey	1. Kris Ayyar; 2. John Price
AIP candidates	One Australia candidates	Republican/BoR candidates	Group E candidates	Group F candidates
1. Sam Watson; 2. Netta Tyson	1. Perry Jewell; 2. Michael Grayson	1. Brian Buckley (RPA); 2. David Bailey (ABR)	1. John Jones; 2. Lee Jones	1. Phillip Young; 2. Harvie Ladlow
Group G candidates	Group H candidates	Group M candidates	Ungrouped candidates	
1. J. Freemarijuana; 2. Tony Kneipp	1. Ian McNiven; 2. Ray Smyth; 3. Robert Marks	1. Maurice Hetherington; 2. Ross Russell	Michelle Mac Nevin; Chris Leth; David Howse; Ross McKay	

=== South Australia ===
Six seats were up for election. The Labor Party was defending two seats. The Liberal Party was defending three seats. The Australian Democrats were defending one seat. Senators Nick Bolkus (Labor), Alan Ferguson (Liberal), Dominic Foreman (Labor), Meg Lees (Democrats), Nick Minchin (Liberal) and Amanda Vanstone (Liberal) were not up for re-election.

Labor candidates	Liberal candidates	Democrats candidates	Greens candidates	CTA candidates
1. **Rosemary Crowley***; 2. **Chris Schacht***; 3. Deirdre Tedmanson	1. **Robert Hill***; 2. **Grant Chapman***; 3. Jeannie Ferris*; 4. Maria Kourtesis	1. **Natasha Stott Despoja***; 2. Ian Gilfillan; 3. Judy Smith; 4. Desea Tsagatos	1. Stephen Spence; 2. Meryl McDougall	1. David Rodway; 2. Brett Rodway
AAFI candidates	Shooters candidates	Women's candidates	Grey Power candidates	EFF candidates
1. Bert Joy; 2. Stephen Wikblom	1. Haydon Aldersey; 2. Robert Low	1. Deborah McCulloch; 2. Marg McHugh; 3. Denise Tzumli	1. Emily Gilbey-Riley; 2. Gratton Darbyshire	1. David Dwyer; 2. Alfred Walker
Group F candidates	Group J candidates	Ungrouped candidates		
1. Michael Wohltmann; 2. Jeanette Wohltmann	1. Kenneth Nicholson; 2. Colin Shearing	Geoffrey Wells (NLP)		

=== Tasmania ===
Six seats were up for election. The Labor Party was defending two seats. The Liberal Party was defending three seats. The Australian Democrats were defending one seat. Senators Eric Abetz (Liberal), John Coates (Labor), Kay Denman (Labor), Brian Gibson (Liberal), Brian Harradine (Independent) and Shayne Murphy (Labor) were not up for re-election.

Labor candidates	Liberal candidates	Democrats candidates	Greens candidates	CTA candidates
1. Sue Mackay*; 2. **Nick Sherry***; 3. Charles Touber	1. **Jocelyn Newman***; 2. **Paul Calvert***; 3. **John Watson***	1. **Robert Bell**; 2. Julia Onsman; 3. Philip Tattersall	1. Bob Brown*; 2. Janet Dale	1. Don Rogers; 2. Beryl Rogers
National candidates	Women's candidates	NLP candidates		
1. Mary Jackson; 2. Jeff Clayton	1. Claire Andersen; 2. Lin MacQueen	1. Gregory Broszczyk; 2. James Harlow		

=== Victoria ===
Six seats were up for election. The Labor Party was defending two seats. The Liberal-National Coalition was defending three seats. The Australian Democrats were defending one seat. Senators Kim Carr (Labor), Jacinta Collins (Labor), Julian McGauran (National), Jim Short (Liberal) and Judith Troeth (Liberal) were not up for re-election. The seat held by Senator Gareth Evans (Labor) was also not up for re-election but was vacant due to his resignation to contest the House of Representatives; this vacancy was filled in April by Stephen Conroy.

Labor candidates	Coalition candidates	Democrats candidates	Greens candidates	DLP candidates
1. **Robert Ray***; 2. **Barney Cooney***; 3. Julia Gillard; 4. Melanie Raymond	1. **Richard Alston*** (Lib); 2. **Rod Kemp*** (Lib); 3. **Kay Patterson*** (Lib); 4. Robert Ettery (Nat); 5. Robyne Head (Lib); 6. Anthony Fernandez (Lib)	1. Lyn Allison*; 2. John McLaren; 3. Laurie Levy; 4. Marj White	1. Peter Singer; 2. Karen Alexander; 3. Helen Lucas	1. John Mulholland; 2. Paul Cahill; 3. Michael Rowe; 4. Pat Crea; 5. Matthew Cody; 6. Christine Dodd
CTA candidates	AAFI candidates	Shooters candidates	NLP candidates	Republican/BoR candidates
1. Ken Cook; 2. Christine Chapman	1. Dennis McCormack; 2. Robyn Spencer	1. Colin Wood; 2. Neville Sayers; 3. Gary Fliegner	1. Stephen Griffith; 2. Ngaire Mason	1. Paul Dahan (RPA); 2. Des Bergen (ABR)
CIR candidates	Group J candidates	Ungrouped candidates		
1. Will Borzatti; 2. Neil McKay	1. Joe Toscano; 2. Steve Roper	Stephen Raskovy; Maurice Smith; Michael Good	Neil Green; John Abbotto; David Armstrong	

=== Western Australia ===
Six seats were up for election. The Labor Party was defending two seats. The Liberal Party was defending three seats. The Greens WA were defending one seat. Senators Ian Campbell (Liberal), Peter Cook (Labor), Chris Ellison (Liberal), Chris Evans (Labor), Sue Knowles (Liberal) and Dee Margetts (Greens) were not up for re-election.

Labor candidates	Liberal candidates	Democrats candidates	Greens candidates	National candidates
1. **Jim McKiernan***; 2. Mark Bishop*; 3. **Michael Beahan**; 4. Catherine Crawford	1. **Winston Crane***; 2. **John Panizza***; 3. Alan Eggleston*; 4. Michael Huston; 5. Enzo Sirna; 6. Clare Thompson	1. Andrew Murray*; 2. Don Millar; 3. Shirley de la Hunty	1. **Christabel Chamarette**; 2. Robin Chapple	1. Kevin McAnuff; 2. Lynley Anderson
CTA candidates	AAFI candidates	Women's candidates	Group C candidates	Ungrouped candidates
1. Don Jackson; 2. Marj Laurie	1. Richard Haye; 2. Robert Hammond	1. Mattie Turnbull; 2. Kate Mudford	1. Tony Drake; 2. Jean Robinson	Craig Bradshaw; Craig Mackintosh; Vin Cooper; Ros White (NLP)

== Summary by party ==
Beside each party is the number of seats contested by that party in the House of Representatives for each state, as well as an indication of whether the party contested the Senate election in the respective state.

Party	NSW		Vic		Qld		WA		SA		Tas		ACT		NT		Total	
Party	HR	S	HR	S	HR	S	HR	S	HR	S	HR	S	HR	S	HR	S	HR	S
Australian Labor Party	50	*	37	*	26	*	14	*	12	*	5	*	3	*	1	*	148	8
Liberal Party of Australia	41	*	35	*	22	*	14	*	12	*	5	*	3	*			132	7
National Party of Australia	12	*	4	*	13	*	2	*			1	*					32	5
Country Liberal Party															1	*	1	1
Australian Democrats	50	*	37	*	26	*	14	*	12	*	5	*		*		*	143	8
Natural Law Party	24	*	34	*	6	*	6	*	9	*		*	1				80	6
Australian Greens	31	*			21	*			12	*			3	*	1	*	68	5
Australians Against Further Immigration	22	*	13	*	2	*	1	*	1								39	5
Call to Australia	23	*	6	*	1	*		*		*		*		*			30	7
Australia's Indigenous Peoples Party					25	*											25	1
Australian Greens Victoria			20	*													20	1
Greens Western Australia							14	*									14	1
Australian Women's Party	1	*			4	*				*		*					5	4
Tasmanian Greens											5	*					5	1
Reclaim Australia: Reduce Immigration	4	*															4	1
No Aircraft Noise	4	*															4	1
One Australia Party					3	*											3	1
Grey Power		*							2	*							2	2
Richmond/Clarence Greens	2																2	
Republican Party of Australia		*		*	1	*											1	3
Pensioner & CIR Alliance			1	*													1	1
Shooters Party		*		*		*				*								4
Australian Bill of Rights Group		*		*		*												3
A Better Future For Our Children		*																1
The Seniors		*																1
Democratic Labor Party				*														1
Independent EFF										*								1
Independent and other	55		26		28		15		14		2		3		2		145	

== See also ==
- 1996 Australian federal election
- Members of the Australian House of Representatives, 1993–1996
- Members of the Australian House of Representatives, 1996–1998
- Members of the Australian Senate, 1993–1996
- Members of the Australian Senate, 1996–1999
- List of political parties in Australia
