= 1996 Australian House of Representatives election =

1996 Australian federal election
- 2 March 1996

All 148 seats in the House of Representatives 75 seats were needed for a majority in the House 40 (of the 76) seats in the Senate
- Registered: 11,740,568 ▲3.13%
- Turnout: 11,244,017 (95.77%) (▲0.02 pp)
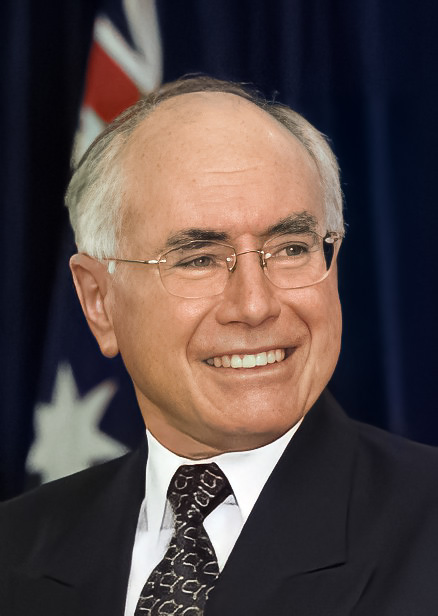

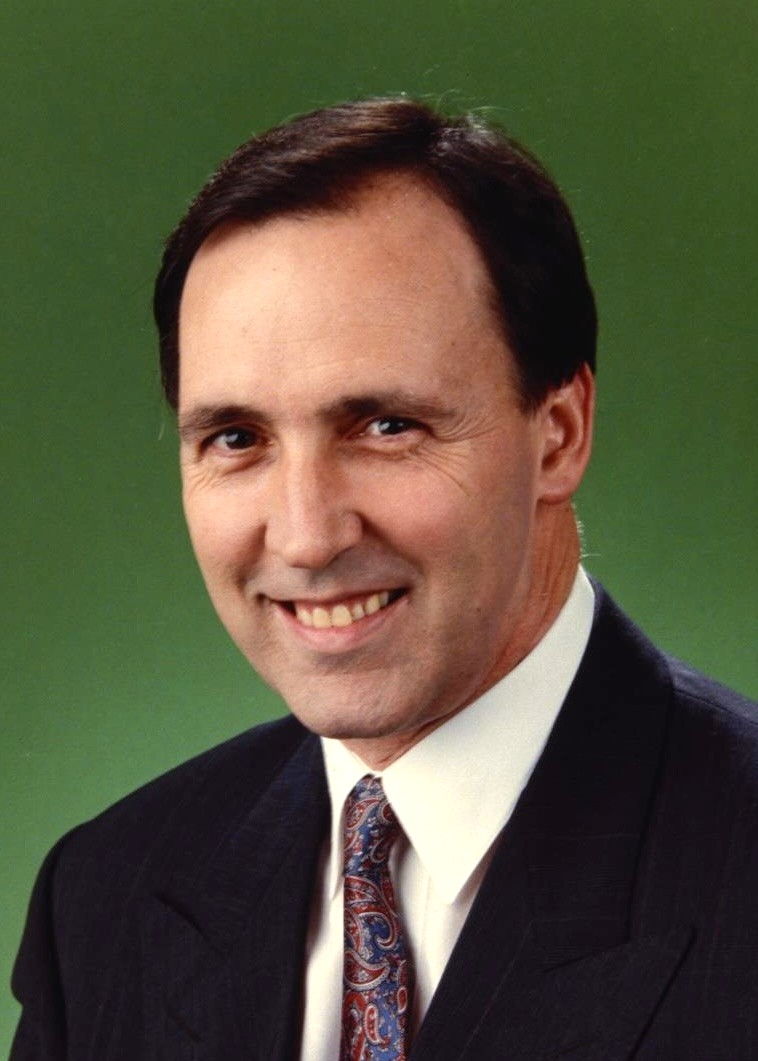
	First party	Second party
Leader	John Howard	Paul Keating
Party	Liberal–National Coalition	Labor
Leader since	30 January 1995	19 December 1991
Leader's seat	Bennelong (NSW)	Blaxland (NSW)
Last election	65 seats	80 seats
Seats won	94 seats	49 seats
Seat change	▲29	▼31
First preference vote	5,142,161	4,217,765
Percentage	47.25%	38.75%
Swing	▲2.98%	▼6.17%
TPP	53.63%	46.37%
TPP swing	▲5.07	▼5.07
- Results by division for the House of Representatives, shaded by winning party's margin of victory.
Prime Minister before election
Paul Keating
Labor
Subsequent Prime Minister
John Howard
Liberal/National coalition

The following tables show results for the Australian House of Representatives at the 1996 federal election held on 2 March 1996.

== Australia ==
House of Reps (IRV) – 1996–1998 – Turnout 94.99% (CV) — Informal 3.78%
Party	Votes	%	Swing	Seats	Change
Liberal	4,210,689	38.69	+1.92	75	▲26
National	893,170	8.21	+1.04	18	▲2
Country Liberal	38,302	0.35	+0.02	1	▲1
Liberal/National Coalition	5,142,161	47.25	+2.98	94	▲29
Labor	4,217,765	38.75	−6.17	49	▼31
Democrats	735,848	6.76	+3.01		
Greens (Note: The Australian Greens were founded in 1992, but not all local organisations immediately affiliated. The Greens total includes Australian Greens, Greens Western Australia, Victorian Greens, Tasmanian Greens, Central Coast Green Party, and Richmond/Clarence Greens.)	317,654	2.92	+1.09		
Independents	262,420	2.41	−0.73	5	▲3
AAFI	73,023	0.67	+0.64		
Call to Australia	43,183	0.40	−0.08		
Natural Law	41,573	0.38	−0.36		
No Aircraft Noise	18,626	0.17	+0.17		
Indigenous Peoples	12,507	0.11	+0.08		
Reclaim Australia	6,457	0.06	+0.06		
Women's Party	6,173	0.06	+0.06		
One Australia	3,159	0.03	+0.03		
Grey Power	2,815	0.03	+0.01		
Pensioner & CIR Alliance	332	0.00	+0.00		
Republican	156	0.00	+0.00		
Total	10,883,852			148	▲1
Two-party-preferred vote
Liberal–National coalition	Win	53.63	+5.07	94	▲29
Labor		46.37	−5.07	49	▼31

== States ==
=== New South Wales ===
1996 Australian federal election (New South Wales)
- 2 March 1996

All 50 New South Wales seats in the Australian House of Representatives and 6 seats in the Australian Senate
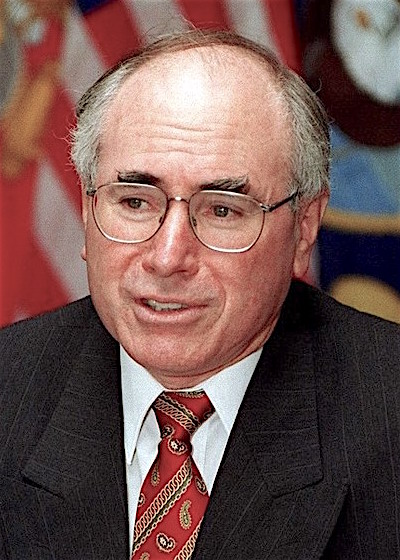

	First party	Second party
Leader	John Howard	Paul Keating
Party	Liberal/National coalition	Labor
Last election	16 seats	33 seats
Seats won	29 seats	20 seats
Seat change	▲13	▼13
Popular vote	1,742,965	1,453,542
Percentage	45.6%	39.6%
Swing	▲4.0	▼8.7
TPP	52.56%	47.44%
TPP swing	▲6.95	▼6.95

Turnout 96.4% (CV) — Informal 3.6%
Party	Votes	%	Swing	Seats	Change
Liberal	1,229,423	33.46	+1.69	19	▲11
National	443,542	12.07	+2.32	10	▲2
Liberal/National Coalition	1,672,965	45.53	+4.01	29	▲13
Labor	1,453,542	39.56	-8.76	20	▼13
Democrats	240,255	6.54	+3.73		
Greens	92,549	2.52	+1.44		
Independents	88,509	2.41		1	Steady
AAFI	52,128	1.42	+1.37		
Christian Democrats	34,108	0.93	+0.31		
No Aircraft Noise	18,626	0.51			
Natural Law	11,252	0.31	–0.35		
Reclaim Australia	5,487	0.15			
Women's Party	1,708	0.05			
Total	3,674,209			50	
Two-party-preferred vote
Liberal/National Coalition	1,922,165	52.56	+6.95	29	▲13
Labor	1,734,777	47.44	-6.95	20	▼13
Invalid/blank votes	138,157	3.62			
Turnout	3,812,366	96.37			
Registered voters	3,955,782				
Source: Federal Elections 1996

=== Victoria ===
1996 Australian federal election (Victoria)
- 2 March 1996

All 37 Victoria seats in the Australian House of Representatives and 6 seats in the Australian Senate
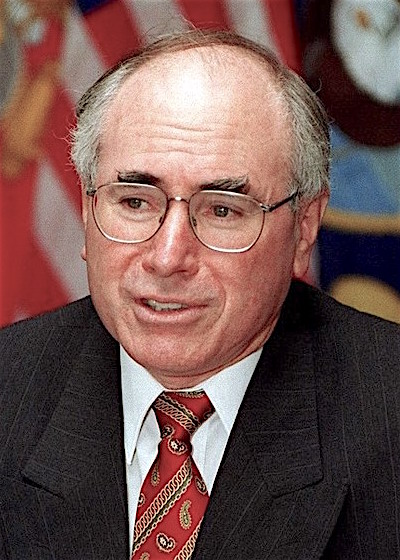

	First party	Second party
Leader	John Howard	Paul Keating
Party	Liberal/National coalition	Labor
Last election	20	17 seats
Seats won	21 seats	16 seats
Seat change	▲1	▼1
Popular vote	1,234,647	1,190,404
Percentage	44.5%	42.9%
Swing	▼0.7	▼3.6
TPP	49.70%	50.30%
TPP swing	▲1.50	▼1.50

Turnout 96.1% (CV) — Informal 2.9%
Party	Votes	%	Swing	Seats	Change
Liberal	1,106,556	39.90	−0.31	19	▲2
National	128,091	4.62	−0.39	2	▼1
Liberal/National Coalition	1,234,647	44.52	−0.70	21	▲1
Labor	1,190,404	42.92	−3.53	16	▼1
Democrats	203,902	7.35	3.66		
Greens	52,812	1.90	1.78		
Independent	45,243	1.63	−1.13		▼1
Natural Law	20,988	0.76	−0.39		
AAFI	16,914	0.61	0.54		
Call to Australia	8,081	0.29	−0.19		
Pensioner and CIR	332	0.00	0.01		
Total	2,773,323			37	▼1
Two-party-preferred vote
Labor	1,388,142	50.30	-1.50	16	▼1
Liberal/National Coalition	1,371,480	49.70	1.50	21	▲1
Invalid/blank votes	83,615	2.93			
Turnout	2,856,936	96.11			
Registered voters	2,972,635				
Source: Federal Elections 1996

=== Queensland ===
1996 Australian federal election (Queensland)
- 2 March 1996

All 26 Queensland seats in the Australian House of Representatives and 6 seats in the Australian Senate
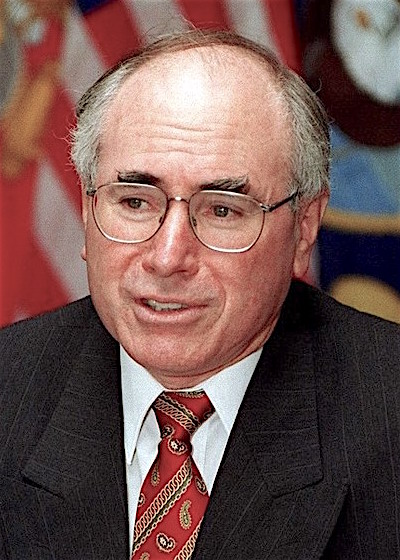

	First party	Second party
Leader	John Howard	Paul Keating
Party	Liberal/National coalition	Labor
Last election	12 seats	13 seats
Seats won	23 seats	2 seats
Seat change	▲11	▼11
Popular vote	1,071,126	664,371
Percentage	54.36%	33.72%
Swing	▲8.37	▼6.77
TPP	60.22%	39.78%
TPP swing	▲8.65	▼8.65

Turnout 96.6% (CV) — Informal 2.5%
Party	Votes	%	Swing	Seats	Change
Liberal	764,140	38.78	7.52	17	▲10
National	306,986	15.58	0.85	6	▲1
Liberal/National Coalition	1,071,126	54.36	8.37	23	▲11
Labor	664,371	33.72	-6.77	2	▼11
Democrats	131,944	6.70	2.64		Steady
Independents (Note: Pauline Hanson has been counted as being elected an independent. She had been disendorsed as the Liberal candidate and ran as an independent, but she remained a Liberal on the ballot paper.)	25,629	1.30	-1.57	1	▲1
Greens	49,462	2.51	-0.69		
Indigenous Peoples	12,507	0.63	-2.19		
Women's Party	4,465	0.23	0.01		
Confederate Action	4,279	0.22	0.03		
One Australia	3,159	0.16			
Natural Law	1,532	0.08			
AAFI	1,258	0.06			
Call to Australia	494	0.03			
Republican	156	0.01			
Total	1,970,382			26	▲1
Two-party-preferred vote
Liberal/National Coalition	1,158,122	60.22	+8.65	23	▲11
Labor	765,019	39.78	-8.65	2	▼11
Invalid/blank votes	50,605	2.50	-0.12		
Turnout	2,020,987	96.63			
Registered voters	2,091,384				
Source: Federal Elections 1996

=== Western Australia ===
1996 Australian federal election (Western Australia)
- 2 March 1996

All 14 Western Australian seats in the Australian House of Representatives and 6 seats in the Australian Senate
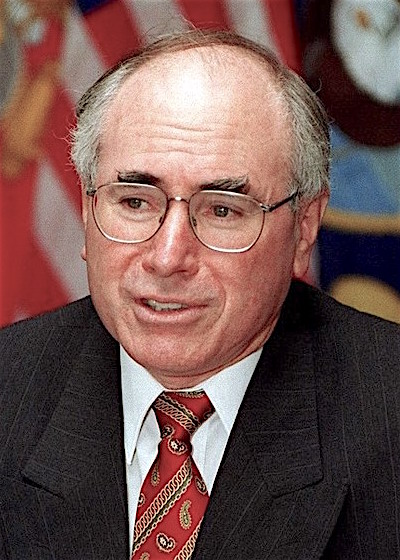

	First party	Second party
Leader	John Howard	Paul Keating
Party	Liberal/National coalition	Labor
Last election	8 seats	6 seats
Seats won	8 seats	3 seats
Seat change	Steady	▼3
Popular vote	453,980	347,583
Percentage	45.3%	34.7%
Swing	▼3.9	▼4.7
TPP	56.00%	44.00%
TPP swing	▲2.02	▼2.02

Turnout 96.6% (CV) — Informal 2.5%
Party	Votes	%	Swing	Seats	Change
Liberal	440,647	44.02	-4.99	8	Steady
National	13,333	1.33	1.09		Steady
Liberal/National Coalition	453,980	45.35	-3.90	8	Steady
Labor	347,583	34.73	-4.62	3	▼3
Independent	87,328	8.72	7.46	3	▲3
Democrats	55,862	5.58	2.30		
Greens	53,101	5.31	-0.46		
Natural Law	2,159	0.22	-0.31		
AAFI	943	0.09			
Total	1,000,956			14	
Two-party-preferred vote
Liberal/National Coalition	557,055	56.00	2.02	8	Steady
Labor	437,694	44.00	-2.02	3	▼3
Invalid/blank votes	32,616	3.16	0.66		
Turnout	1,033,572	94.95			
Registered voters	1,088,487				
Source: Federal Elections 1996

=== South Australia ===
1996 Australian federal election (South Australia)
- 2 March 1996

All 12 South Australian seats in the Australian House of Representatives and 6 seats in the Australian Senate
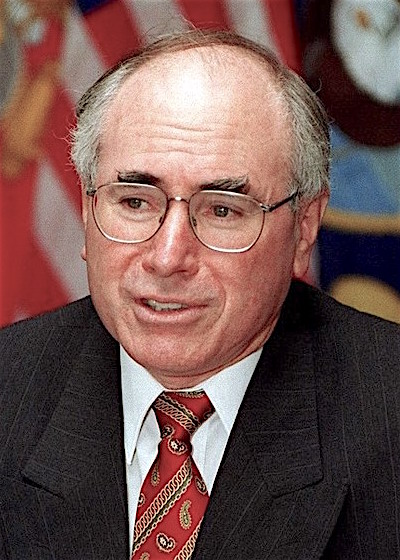

	First party	Second party
Leader	John Howard	Paul Keating
Party	Liberal/National coalition	Labor
Last election	8	4 seats
Seats won	10 seats	2 seats
Seat change	▲2	▼2
Popular vote	420,246	320,678
Percentage	50.0%	34.8%
Swing	▲4.3	▼4.0
TPP	57.3%	42.7%
TPP swing	▲4.6	▼4.6

Turnout 95.9% (CV) — Informal 4.1%
Party	Votes	%	Swing	Seats	Change
Liberal	460,246	49.99	+4.33	10	▲2
Labor	320,678	34.83	-4.01	2	▼2
Democrats	93,899	10.20	+2.41		
Greens	27,146	2.95	+2.79		
Independent	9,660	1.05	-3.64		
Natural Law	4,495	0.49	-0.98		
Grey Power	2,815	0.31	+0.12		
AAFI	1,780	0.19			
Total	959,891			12	
Two-party-preferred vote
Liberal/National Coalition	524,445	57.26	4.59	10	▲2
Labor	391,516	42.74	-4.59	2	▼2
Invalid/blank votes	39,162	4.08	0.02		
Turnout	959,881	95.89			
Registered voters	1,001,006				
Source: Federal Elections 1996

=== Tasmania ===
1996 Australian federal election (Tasmania)
- 2 March 1996

All 5 Tasmanian seats in the Australian House of Representatives and 6 seats in the Australian Senate

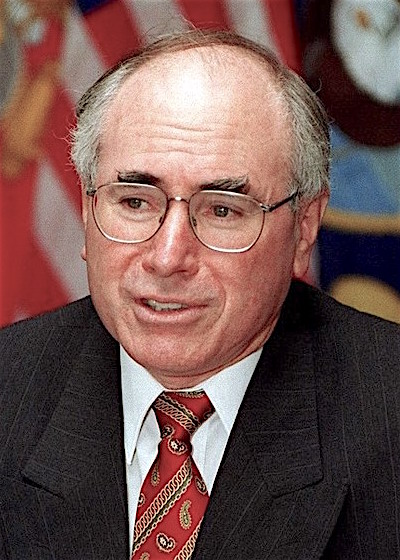
	First party	Second party
Leader	Paul Keating	John Howard
Party	Labor	Liberal/National coalition
Last election	4 seats	1 seat
Seats won	3 seats	2 seats
Seat change	▼1	▲1
Popular vote	137,607	139,305
Percentage	44.3%	44.9%
Swing	▼2.5	▲2.8
TPP	51.58%	48.72%
TPP swing	▼3.07	▲3.07

Turnout 96.6% (CV) — Informal 2.3%
Party	Votes	%	Swing	Seats	Change
Liberal	138,087	44.46	+2.42	2	▲1
National	1,218	0.39	+0.39		
Liberal/National Coalition	139,305	44.85	+2.81	2	▲1
Labor	137,607	44.31	−2.45	3	▼1
Greens	19,689	6.34	−1.58		
Democrats	12,696	4.09	+1.60		
Independent	1,274	0.41	−0.09		
Total	310,571			5	
Two-party-preferred vote
Labor	159,853	51.58	−3.07	3	▼1
Liberal/National Coalition	150,057	48.42	+3.07	2	▲1
Invalid/blank votes	7,472	2.35	−0.38		
Turnout	318,043	96.58			
Registered voters	329,304				
Source: Federal Elections 1996

|abc

== Territories ==
=== Australian Capital Territory ===
1996 Australian federal election (Australian Capital Territory)
- 2 March 1996

All 3 Australian Capital Territory seats in the Australian House of Representatives and both seats in the Australian Senate

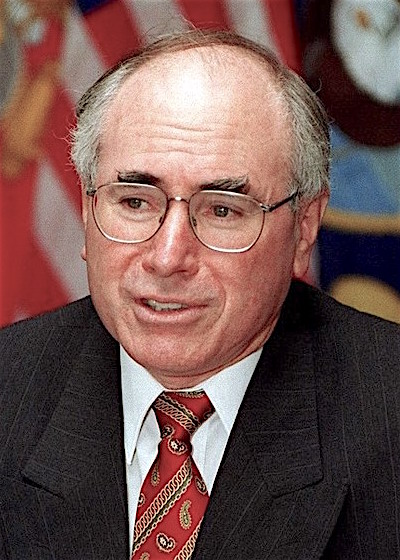
	First party	Second party
Leader	Paul Keating	John Howard
Party	Labor	Coalition
Last election	2 seats	0 seats
Seats won	3 seats	0 seats
Seat change	▲1	Steady
Popular vote	91,447	78,109
Percentage	47.91%	40.92%
Swing	▼5.43	▲6.73
TPP	55.5%	45.5%
TPP swing	▼5.7	▲5.7

Turnout 96.7% (CV) — Informal 2.8%
Party	Votes	%	Swing	Seats	Change
Labor	91,447	47.91	–5.43	3	▲1
Liberal	78,109	40.92	+6.73		Steady
Greens	16,596	8.70	+6.97		
Natural Law	778	0.41	–0.39		
Independents	3,933	2.06	–1.21		
Total	190,863			3	▲1
Two-party-preferred vote
Labor	105,323	55.5	–5.7	3	▲1
Liberal	84,592	45.5	+5.7	0	Steady
Invalid/blank votes	5,543	2.82	–0.53		
Turnout	196,406	96.67			
Registered voters	203,170				
Source: Federal Elections 1996

=== Northern Territory ===
1996 Australian federal election (Northern Territory)
- 2 March 1996

The one Northern Territory seat in the Australian House of Representatives and both seats in the Australian Senate
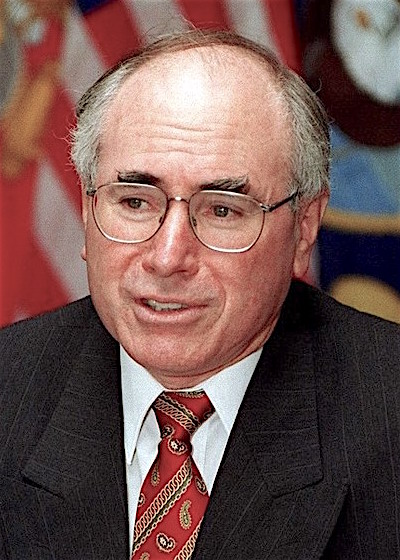

	First party	Second party
Leader	John Howard	Paul Keating
Party	Coalition	Labor
Last election	0 seats	1 seat
Seats won	1	0
Seat change	▲1	▼1
Popular vote	38,302	36,994
Percentage	45.04%	43.50%
Swing	▲0.35	▼11.81
TPP	50.37%	49.63%
TPP swing	▲5.68	▼5.68

1996 Australian federal election: Northern Territory
Party	Candidate	Votes	%	±%
Country Liberal	Nick Dondas	38,302	45.04	+0.35
Labor	Warren Snowdon	36,994	43.50	−11.81
Greens	Philip Nitschke	5,324	6.26	+6.26
Independent	Bernie Brian	2,710	3.19	+3.19
Independent	Pamela Gardiner	1,713	2.01	+2.01
Total formal votes		85,043	96.61	−0.29
Informal votes		2,985	3.39	+0.29
Turnout		88,028	89.10	+0.30
Two-party-preferred result
Country Liberal	Nick Dondas	42,630	50.37	+5.68
Labor	Warren Snowdon	42,003	49.63	−5.68
Country Liberal gain from Labor		Swing	+5.68	

== See also ==
- Results of the 1996 Australian federal election (Senate)
- Members of the Australian House of Representatives, 1996–1998
