= Results of the 1996 Australian federal election in Queensland =

1996 Australian federal election (Queensland)
- 2 March 1996

All 26 Queensland seats in the Australian House of Representatives and 6 seats in the Australian Senate
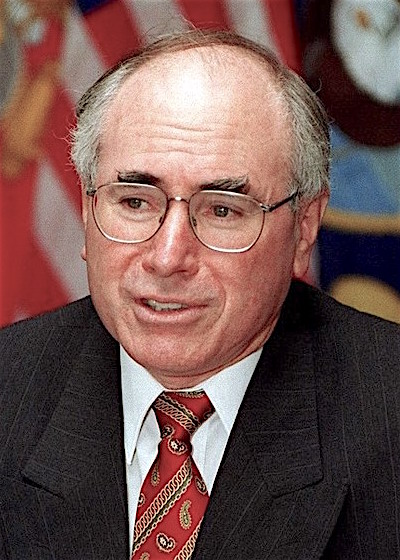

| | First party | Second party |
|---|---|---|
| Leader | John Howard | Paul Keating |
| Party | Liberal/National coalition | Labor |
| Last election | 12 seats | 13 seats |
| Seats won | 23 seats | 2 seats |
| Seat change | ▲11 | ▼11 |
| Popular vote | 1,071,126 | 664,371 |
| Percentage | 54.36% | 33.72% |
| Swing | ▲8.37 | ▼6.77 |
| TPP | 60.22% | 39.78% |
| TPP swing | ▲8.65 | ▼8.65 |

This is a list of electoral division results for the Australian 1996 federal election in the state of Queensland.

== Overall results ==
Turnout 96.6% (CV) — Informal 2.5%
| Party | Votes | % | Swing | Seats | Change |
|---|---|---|---|---|---|
| Liberal | 764,140 | 38.78 | 7.52 | 17 | ▲10 |
| National | 306,986 | 15.58 | 0.85 | 6 | ▲1 |
| Liberal/National Coalition | 1,071,126 | 54.36 | 8.37 | 23 | ▲11 |
| Labor | 664,371 | 33.72 | -6.77 | 2 | ▼11 |
| Democrats | 131,944 | 6.70 | 2.64 | | Steady |
| Independents (Note: Pauline Hanson has been counted as being elected an independent. She had been disendorsed as the Liberal candidate and ran as an independent, but she remained a Liberal on the ballot paper.) | 25,629 | 1.30 | -1.57 | 1 | ▲1 |
| Greens | 49,462 | 2.51 | -0.69 | | |
| Indigenous Peoples | 12,507 | 0.63 | -2.19 | | |
| Women's Party | 4,465 | 0.23 | 0.01 | | |
| Confederate Action | 4,279 | 0.22 | 0.03 | | |
| One Australia | 3,159 | 0.16 | | | |
| Natural Law | 1,532 | 0.08 | | | |
| AAFI | 1,258 | 0.06 | | | |
| Call to Australia | 494 | 0.03 | | | |
| Republican | 156 | 0.01 | | | |
| Total | 1,970,382 | | | 26 | ▲1 |
Two-party-preferred vote
| Liberal/National Coalition | 1,158,122 | 60.22 | +8.65 | 23 | ▲11 |
| Labor | 765,019 | 39.78 | -8.65 | 2 | ▼11 |
| Invalid/blank votes | 50,605 | 2.50 | -0.12 | | |
| Turnout | 2,020,987 | 96.63 | | | |
| Registered voters | 2,091,384 | | | | |
Source: Federal Elections 1996

== Results by division ==
=== Bowman ===
1996 Australian federal election: Bowman
| Party | Candidate | Votes | % | ±% |
|---|---|---|---|---|
| Liberal | Andrea West | 33,088 | 46.53 | +12.17 |
| Labor | Con Sciacca | 29,964 | 42.13 | −9.35 |
| Democrats | Jenny van Rooyen | 5,954 | 8.37 | +4.50 |
| Greens | Tony Krajniw | 1,780 | 2.50 | −1.34 |
| Indigenous Peoples | Selina Reilly | 331 | 0.47 | +0.47 |
| Total formal votes | | 71,117 | 97.82 | +0.37 |
| Informal votes | | 1,587 | 2.18 | −0.37 |
| Turnout | | 72,704 | 95.52 | −0.74 |
Two-party-preferred result
| Liberal | Andrea West | 36,104 | 50.89 | +9.03 |
| Labor | Con Sciacca | 34,836 | 49.11 | −9.03 |
| Liberal gain from Labor | | Swing | +9.03 | |

=== Brisbane ===
1996 Australian federal election: Brisbane
| Party | Candidate | Votes | % | ±% |
|---|---|---|---|---|
| Liberal | Jane Williamson | 34,686 | 44.65 | +8.59 |
| Labor | Arch Bevis | 29,684 | 38.21 | −7.44 |
| Democrats | Andrew Bartlett | 7,024 | 9.04 | +3.21 |
| Greens | Mark Taylor | 3,180 | 4.09 | −0.80 |
| Women's Party | Jenny Dunn | 1,354 | 1.74 | +1.74 |
| Independent | Bob Leach | 739 | 0.95 | +0.95 |
| Independent | Zanny Begg | 508 | 0.65 | +0.65 |
| Indigenous Peoples | Rose Mather | 263 | 0.34 | +0.34 |
| Natural Law | Mark Brady | 243 | 0.31 | −0.39 |
| Total formal votes | | 77,681 | 97.59 | +0.56 |
| Informal votes | | 1,917 | 2.41 | −0.56 |
| Turnout | | 79,598 | 92.75 | −2.17 |
Two-party-preferred result
| Labor | Arch Bevis | 38,892 | 50.36 | −5.84 |
| Liberal | Jane Williamson | 38,333 | 49.64 | +5.84 |
| Labor hold | | Swing | −5.84 | |

=== Capricornia ===
1996 Australian federal election: Capricornia
| Party | Candidate | Votes | % | ±% |
|---|---|---|---|---|
| Labor | Marjorie Henzell | 31,531 | 40.37 | −0.45 |
| National | Paul Marek | 21,823 | 27.94 | +5.89 |
| Liberal | Mike Wilkinson | 18,321 | 23.46 | +6.75 |
| Democrats | Fay Lawrence | 4,071 | 5.21 | +3.02 |
| Greens | Bob Muir | 1,980 | 2.54 | +0.89 |
| Indigenous Peoples | Bevan Tull | 371 | 0.48 | +0.16 |
| Total formal votes | | 78,097 | 97.83 | +0.42 |
| Informal votes | | 1,733 | 2.17 | −0.42 |
| Turnout | | 79,830 | 95.42 | −0.65 |
Two-party-preferred result
| National | Paul Marek | 41,801 | 53.62 | +6.40 |
| Labor | Marjorie Henzell | 36,153 | 46.38 | −6.40 |
| National gain from Labor | | Swing | +6.40 | |

=== Dawson ===
1996 Australian federal election: Dawson
| Party | Candidate | Votes | % | ±% |
|---|---|---|---|---|
| National | De-Anne Kelly | 28,359 | 35.74 | −2.68 |
| Labor | Frank Gilbert | 28,168 | 35.50 | −2.84 |
| Liberal | Greg Williamson | 18,937 | 23.87 | +16.27 |
| Democrats | Kevin Paine | 3,095 | 3.90 | +1.39 |
| | Tony Duckett | 542 | 0.68 | +0.68 |
| Indigenous Peoples | Len Watson | 245 | 0.31 | +0.31 |
| Total formal votes | | 79,346 | 97.76 | +0.52 |
| Informal votes | | 1,816 | 2.24 | −0.52 |
| Turnout | | 81,162 | 94.94 | −0.76 |
Two-party-preferred result
| National | De-Anne Kelly | 47,461 | 59.92 | +5.96 |
| Labor | Frank Gilbert | 31,744 | 40.08 | −5.96 |
| National hold | | Swing | +5.96 | |

=== Dickson ===
1996 Australian federal election: Dickson
| Party | Candidate | Votes | % | ±% |
|---|---|---|---|---|
| Liberal | Tony Smith | 32,418 | 42.02 | +6.23 |
| Labor | Michael Lavarch | 30,800 | 39.92 | −5.94 |
| Democrats | Tom Spencer | 4,653 | 6.03 | +2.59 |
| National | John Saunders | 4,615 | 5.98 | −0.06 |
| Greens | Kim Pantano | 2,240 | 2.90 | −1.46 |
| Independent | Rona Joyner | 1,154 | 1.50 | +1.50 |
| Indigenous Peoples | Geoffrey Atkinson | 470 | 0.61 | +0.61 |
| Independent | Theoron Toon | 462 | 0.60 | +0.60 |
| Natural Law | Geoff Wilson | 190 | 0.25 | +0.16 |
| Republican | Peter Consandine | 156 | 0.20 | +0.20 |
| Total formal votes | | 77,158 | 97.57 | −0.30 |
| Informal votes | | 1,921 | 2.43 | +0.30 |
| Turnout | | 79,079 | 96.02 | +5.81 |
Two-party-preferred result
| Liberal | Tony Smith | 40,933 | 53.17 | +5.72 |
| Labor | Michael Lavarch | 36,051 | 46.83 | −5.72 |
| Liberal gain from Labor | | Swing | +5.72 | |

=== Fadden ===
1996 Australian federal election: Fadden
| Party | Candidate | Votes | % | ±% |
|---|---|---|---|---|
| Liberal | David Jull | 42,977 | 60.84 | +13.42 |
| Labor | Ray Merlehan | 18,349 | 25.98 | −10.52 |
| Democrats | Hetty Johnston | 6,937 | 9.82 | +5.37 |
| Greens | William Gabriel | 1,729 | 2.45 | −1.75 |
| Indigenous Peoples | Dulcie May Bronsch | 642 | 0.91 | +0.70 |
| Total formal votes | | 70,634 | 97.57 | +0.14 |
| Informal votes | | 1,762 | 2.43 | −0.14 |
| Turnout | | 72,396 | 94.82 | −0.60 |
Two-party-preferred result
| Liberal | David Jull | 47,796 | 67.84 | +12.68 |
| Labor | Ray Merlehan | 22,662 | 32.16 | −12.68 |
| Liberal hold | | Swing | +12.68 | |

=== Fairfax ===
1996 Australian federal election: Fairfax
| Party | Candidate | Votes | % | ±% |
|---|---|---|---|---|
| Liberal | Alex Somlyay | 44,994 | 62.14 | +22.34 |
| Labor | Peter Marconi | 17,355 | 23.97 | −6.65 |
| Democrats | Elizabeth Oss-Emer | 5,808 | 8.02 | +3.32 |
| Greens | John Fitzgerald | 3,868 | 5.34 | +1.25 |
| Indigenous Peoples | Colin Hicks | 384 | 0.53 | +0.53 |
| Total formal votes | | 72,409 | 97.76 | +0.23 |
| Informal votes | | 1,659 | 2.24 | −0.23 |
| Turnout | | 74,068 | 94.16 | −0.69 |
Two-party-preferred result
| Liberal | Alex Somlyay | 49,109 | 68.09 | +8.05 |
| Labor | Peter Marconi | 23,010 | 31.91 | −8.05 |
| Liberal hold | | Swing | +8.05 | |

=== Fisher ===
1996 Australian federal election: Fisher
| Party | Candidate | Votes | % | ±% |
|---|---|---|---|---|
| Liberal | Peter Slipper | 30,902 | 45.07 | +12.13 |
| Labor | John Henderson | 15,685 | 22.88 | −8.69 |
| National | John Bjelke-Petersen | 14,115 | 20.59 | −0.25 |
| Democrats | Alan Kerlin | 3,625 | 5.29 | +2.09 |
| Greens | Chris Gwin | 1,686 | 2.46 | −0.37 |
| Independent | Lorraine Barnes | 830 | 1.21 | +1.21 |
| Women's Party | Louise Peach | 826 | 1.20 | +1.20 |
| AAFI | Margaret Lazarenko | 523 | 0.76 | +0.76 |
| Independent | Gordon Earnshaw | 257 | 0.37 | +0.37 |
| Indigenous Peoples | Alex Bond | 117 | 0.17 | −0.07 |
| Total formal votes | | 68,566 | 97.45 | −0.21 |
| Informal votes | | 1,794 | 2.55 | +0.21 |
| Turnout | | 70,360 | 94.89 | −0.92 |
Two-party-preferred result
| Liberal | Peter Slipper | 48,107 | 70.34 | +10.02 |
| Labor | John Henderson | 20,286 | 29.66 | −10.02 |
| Liberal hold | | Swing | +10.02 | |

=== Forde ===
1996 Australian federal election: Forde
| Party | Candidate | Votes | % | ±% |
|---|---|---|---|---|
| Liberal | Kay Elson | 28,172 | 40.82 | +3.63 |
| Labor | Mary Crawford | 23,201 | 33.62 | −9.15 |
| National | Garth Carey | 9,833 | 14.25 | +6.06 |
| Democrats | Xanthe Adams | 5,507 | 7.98 | +2.69 |
| Greens | Aaron Wise | 1,683 | 2.44 | −0.42 |
| Indigenous Peoples | Marshall Bell | 612 | 0.89 | +0.84 |
| Total formal votes | | 69,008 | 97.26 | −0.05 |
| Informal votes | | 1,943 | 2.74 | +0.05 |
| Turnout | | 70,951 | 93.51 | −1.07 |
Two-party-preferred result
| Liberal | Kay Elson | 41,087 | 59.70 | +9.44 |
| Labor | Mary Crawford | 27,735 | 40.30 | −9.44 |
| Liberal gain from Labor | | Swing | +9.44 | |

=== Griffith ===
1996 Australian federal election: Griffith
| Party | Candidate | Votes | % | ±% |
|---|---|---|---|---|
| Liberal | Graeme McDougall | 33,262 | 43.78 | +7.42 |
| Labor | Kevin Rudd | 31,407 | 41.34 | −6.89 |
| Democrats | Iain Renton | 4,714 | 6.21 | +1.62 |
| National | David Stone | 2,818 | 3.71 | +0.19 |
| Greens | Barry Wilson | 1,951 | 2.57 | −1.60 |
| Women's Party | Jeni Eastwood | 947 | 1.25 | +1.25 |
| Independent | Gary Holland | 401 | 0.53 | +0.53 |
| Independent | Coral Wynter | 296 | 0.39 | −0.49 |
| Indigenous Peoples | John Leslie | 172 | 0.23 | +0.08 |
| Total formal votes | | 75,968 | 97.59 | +0.17 |
| Informal votes | | 1,878 | 2.41 | −0.17 |
| Turnout | | 77,846 | 94.76 | +0.42 |
Two-party-preferred result
| Liberal | Graeme McDougall | 38,981 | 51.47 | +7.37 |
| Labor | Kevin Rudd | 36,761 | 48.53 | −7.37 |
| Liberal gain from Labor | | Swing | +7.37 | |

=== Groom ===
1996 Australian federal election: Groom
| Party | Candidate | Votes | % | ±% |
|---|---|---|---|---|
| Liberal | Bill Taylor | 50,046 | 64.82 | +30.44 |
| Labor | Neville Green | 17,085 | 22.13 | −4.67 |
| Democrats | Mark Carew | 4,459 | 5.78 | +2.01 |
| Greens | Sarah Moles | 1,789 | 2.32 | +0.05 |
| Independent | Peter Ousby | 1,657 | 2.15 | +2.15 |
| One Australia | Ray Buckley | 1,578 | 2.04 | +2.04 |
| Indigenous Peoples | W. J. McCarthy | 595 | 0.77 | −0.43 |
| Total formal votes | | 77,209 | 97.71 | +0.13 |
| Informal votes | | 1,813 | 2.29 | −0.13 |
| Turnout | | 79,022 | 95.52 | −0.70 |
Two-party-preferred result
| Liberal | Bill Taylor | 54,894 | 71.28 | +7.16 |
| Labor | Neville Green | 22,117 | 28.72 | −7.16 |
| Liberal hold | | Swing | +7.16 | |

=== Herbert ===
1996 Australian federal election: Herbert
| Party | Candidate | Votes | % | ±% |
|---|---|---|---|---|
| Liberal | Peter Lindsay | 29,405 | 38.75 | +7.36 |
| Labor | Ted Lindsay | 27,812 | 36.65 | −4.49 |
| National | Ken Kipping | 11,468 | 15.11 | +8.92 |
| Democrats | Colin Edwards | 4,473 | 5.89 | +2.16 |
| Women's Party | Josephine Sailor | 1,338 | 1.76 | +1.76 |
| Independent | David Smallwood | 730 | 0.96 | +0.96 |
| Independent | Alex Caldwell | 660 | 0.87 | +0.87 |
| Total formal votes | | 75,886 | 97.42 | −0.06 |
| Informal votes | | 2,010 | 2.58 | +0.06 |
| Turnout | | 77,896 | 94.12 | −1.45 |
Two-party-preferred result
| Liberal | Peter Lindsay | 42,826 | 56.59 | +9.90 |
| Labor | Ted Lindsay | 32,852 | 43.41 | −9.90 |
| Liberal gain from Labor | | Swing | +9.90 | |

=== Hinkler ===
1996 Australian federal election: Hinkler
| Party | Candidate | Votes | % | ±% |
|---|---|---|---|---|
| National | Paul Neville | 43,497 | 55.47 | +25.39 |
| Labor | Brian Courtice | 28,326 | 36.12 | −6.79 |
| Democrats | Taha Dabbagh | 4,019 | 5.12 | +1.11 |
| Independent | Adrian Souterboek | 1,820 | 2.32 | +2.32 |
| Indigenous Peoples | Colin Johnson | 758 | 0.97 | +0.63 |
| Total formal votes | | 78,420 | 97.59 | −0.26 |
| Informal votes | | 1,938 | 2.41 | +0.26 |
| Turnout | | 80,358 | 95.47 | −0.63 |
Two-party-preferred result
| National | Paul Neville | 47,233 | 60.36 | +10.39 |
| Labor | Brian Courtice | 31,023 | 39.64 | −10.39 |
| National gain from Labor | | Swing | +10.39 | |

=== Kennedy ===
1996 Australian federal election: Kennedy
| Party | Candidate | Votes | % | ±% |
|---|---|---|---|---|
| National | Bob Katter | 45,074 | 59.91 | +22.75 |
| Labor | Fay Donovan | 22,257 | 29.58 | −11.84 |
| Democrats | Col Parker | 4,973 | 6.61 | +4.02 |
| Greens | Jo Valentine | 1,807 | 2.40 | −0.20 |
| Indigenous Peoples | Clarence Walden | 1,124 | 1.49 | +0.96 |
| Total formal votes | | 75,235 | 97.13 | +0.13 |
| Informal votes | | 2,221 | 2.87 | −0.13 |
| Turnout | | 77,456 | 93.66 | −0.27 |
Two-party-preferred result
| National | Bob Katter | 48,440 | 64.49 | +11.95 |
| Labor | Fay Donovan | 26,673 | 35.51 | −11.95 |
| National hold | | Swing | +11.95 | |

=== Leichhardt ===
1996 Australian federal election: Leichhardt
| Party | Candidate | Votes | % | ±% |
|---|---|---|---|---|
| Labor | Peter Dodd | 28,392 | 38.05 | −3.91 |
| Liberal | Warren Entsch | 23,721 | 31.79 | +0.20 |
| National | Bob Burgess | 15,236 | 20.42 | +6.41 |
| Democrats | Leonie Watson | 3,578 | 4.80 | −0.41 |
| Greens | Pat Daly | 2,081 | 2.79 | −0.73 |
| Independent | Steve Dimitriou | 871 | 1.17 | +1.17 |
| Indigenous Peoples | Jeanette Simpson | 387 | 0.52 | +0.52 |
| Natural Law | Margaret Leviston | 352 | 0.47 | −0.71 |
| Total formal votes | | 74,618 | 97.12 | +0.41 |
| Informal votes | | 2,213 | 2.88 | −0.41 |
| Turnout | | 76,831 | 92.32 | −1.07 |
Two-party-preferred result
| Liberal | Warren Entsch | 40,332 | 54.18 | +5.51 |
| Labor | Peter Dodd | 34,102 | 45.82 | −5.51 |
| Liberal gain from Labor | | Swing | +5.51 | |

=== Lilley ===
1996 Australian federal election: Lilley
| Party | Candidate | Votes | % | ±% |
|---|---|---|---|---|
| Liberal | Elizabeth Grace | 36,053 | 46.11 | +10.15 |
| Labor | Wayne Swan | 33,765 | 43.18 | −6.73 |
| Democrats | Michael Hipwood | 5,145 | 6.58 | +2.41 |
| Greens | Noel Clothier | 2,221 | 2.84 | −0.30 |
| Independent | Daryl Bertwistle | 796 | 1.02 | +1.02 |
| Indigenous Peoples | Gloria Beckett | 210 | 0.27 | +0.27 |
| Total formal votes | | 78,190 | 97.96 | +0.45 |
| Informal votes | | 1,627 | 2.04 | −0.45 |
| Turnout | | 79,817 | 94.56 | −1.18 |
Two-party-preferred result
| Liberal | Elizabeth Grace | 39,564 | 50.73 | +6.91 |
| Labor | Wayne Swan | 38,429 | 49.27 | −6.91 |
| Liberal gain from Labor | | Swing | +6.91 | |

=== Longman ===
1996 Australian federal election: Longman
| Party | Candidate | Votes | % | ±% |
|---|---|---|---|---|
| Liberal | Mal Brough | 27,704 | 38.74 | +6.68 |
| Labor | Pat Bonnice | 21,943 | 30.69 | −8.57 |
| National | Tom Bradley | 12,611 | 17.64 | +4.80 |
| Democrats | Greg Hollis | 5,276 | 7.38 | +4.41 |
| Greens | Jim Dimo | 2,145 | 3.00 | −0.54 |
| Independent | Terence Madden | 966 | 1.35 | +1.35 |
| One Australia | Geoffrey Abnett | 673 | 0.94 | +0.94 |
| Indigenous Peoples | Norman Hegarty | 187 | 0.26 | +0.06 |
| Total formal votes | | 71,505 | 97.33 | −0.33 |
| Informal votes | | 1,962 | 2.67 | +0.33 |
| Turnout | | 73,467 | 95.58 | |
Two-party-preferred result
| Liberal | Mal Brough | 43,894 | 61.59 | +8.13 |
| Labor | Pat Bonnice | 27,374 | 38.41 | −8.13 |
| Liberal notional hold | | Swing | +8.13 | |

=== Maranoa ===
1996 Australian federal election: Maranoa
| Party | Candidate | Votes | % | ±% |
|---|---|---|---|---|
| National | Bruce Scott | 53,867 | 70.49 | +17.06 |
| Labor | Bob Murray | 16,066 | 21.02 | −4.05 |
| Democrats | Alan May | 4,630 | 6.06 | +3.43 |
| Indigenous Peoples | Franklin Beatty | 1,855 | 2.43 | +1.62 |
| Total formal votes | | 76,418 | 97.02 | −0.12 |
| Informal votes | | 2,348 | 2.98 | +0.12 |
| Turnout | | 78,766 | 95.39 | −0.34 |
Two-party-preferred result
| National | Bruce Scott | 57,792 | 75.73 | +7.59 |
| Labor | Bob Murray | 18,526 | 24.27 | −7.59 |
| National hold | | Swing | +7.59 | |

=== McPherson ===
1996 Australian federal election: McPherson
| Party | Candidate | Votes | % | ±% |
|---|---|---|---|---|
| Liberal | John Bradford | 42,640 | 61.57 | +12.39 |
| Labor | Margaret Andrews | 18,122 | 26.17 | −10.29 |
| Democrats | Melinda Norman-Hicks | 4,460 | 6.44 | +2.65 |
| Greens | Anja Light | 3,109 | 4.49 | +0.32 |
| Independent | Kevin Goodwin | 634 | 0.92 | +0.92 |
| Indigenous Peoples | David Dillon | 284 | 0.41 | +0.41 |
| Total formal votes | | 69,249 | 97.18 | −0.23 |
| Informal votes | | 2,013 | 2.82 | +0.23 |
| Turnout | | 71,262 | 93.95 | −0.93 |
Two-party-preferred result
| Liberal | John Bradford | 46,298 | 67.00 | +8.56 |
| Labor | Margaret Andrews | 22,803 | 33.00 | −8.56 |
| Liberal hold | | Swing | +8.56 | |

=== Moncrieff ===
1996 Australian federal election: Moncrieff
| Party | Candidate | Votes | % | ±% |
|---|---|---|---|---|
| Liberal | Kathy Sullivan | 43,098 | 64.81 | +11.84 |
| Labor | Mike Smith | 15,150 | 22.78 | −9.27 |
| Greens | Inge Light | 3,311 | 4.98 | +0.99 |
| Democrats | Noel Payne | 3,286 | 4.94 | +1.05 |
| Independent | Andrew Prenzler | 526 | 0.79 | +0.79 |
| Call to Australia | Matthew Mackechnie | 494 | 0.74 | +0.74 |
| Natural Law | Sandy Price | 327 | 0.49 | +0.49 |
| Indigenous Peoples | Ian Pilgrim | 303 | 0.46 | +0.46 |
| Total formal votes | | 66,495 | 96.89 | −0.52 |
| Informal votes | | 2,134 | 3.11 | +0.52 |
| Turnout | | 68,629 | 93.18 | −1.54 |
Two-party-preferred result
| Liberal | Kathy Sullivan | 46,599 | 70.25 | +7.34 |
| Labor | Mike Smith | 19,731 | 29.75 | −7.34 |
| Liberal hold | | Swing | +7.34 | |

=== Moreton ===
1996 Australian federal election: Moreton
| Party | Candidate | Votes | % | ±% |
|---|---|---|---|---|
| Liberal | Gary Hardgrave | 39,268 | 50.18 | +7.83 |
| Labor | Garrie Gibson | 28,886 | 36.92 | −6.62 |
| Democrats | Kirsten Kirk | 5,076 | 6.49 | +1.78 |
| Greens | Annette Wilson | 2,572 | 3.29 | −0.48 |
| AAFI | Keith Bremner | 735 | 0.94 | +0.94 |
| Independent | Wendy Dent | 581 | 0.74 | +0.74 |
| Independent | Cameron Armstrong | 547 | 0.70 | +0.70 |
| Independent | Shane Dean | 234 | 0.30 | +0.07 |
| Indigenous Peoples | Norman Johns | 195 | 0.25 | −0.37 |
| Natural Law | Jacqueline Dhanji-Ayyar | 153 | 0.20 | +0.17 |
| Total formal votes | | 78,247 | 97.16 | −0.10 |
| Informal votes | | 2,288 | 2.84 | +0.10 |
| Turnout | | 80,535 | 94.83 | −0.75 |
Two-party-preferred result
| Liberal | Gary Hardgrave | 42,997 | 55.09 | +5.30 |
| Labor | Garrie Gibson | 35,051 | 44.91 | −5.30 |
| Liberal gain from Labor | | Swing | +5.30 | |

=== Oxley ===
1996 Australian federal election: Oxley
| Party | Candidate | Votes | % | ±% |
|---|---|---|---|---|
| Liberal | Pauline Hanson* | 33,960 | 48.61 | +22.86 |
| Labor | Les Scott | 27,497 | 39.36 | −15.18 |
| Democrats | David Pullen | 4,248 | 6.08 | +0.56 |
| Greens | John McKeon | 1,870 | 2.68 | −1.74 |
| Independent | Victor Robb | 1,094 | 1.57 | +1.57 |
| | Carl Wyles | 765 | 1.09 | +1.09 |
| Indigenous Peoples | Bill Chapman | 433 | 0.62 | +0.62 |
| Total formal votes | | 69,867 | 97.15 | +0.47 |
| Informal votes | | 2,049 | 2.85 | −0.47 |
| Turnout | | 71,916 | 94.94 | −0.92 |
Two-party-preferred result
| Liberal | Pauline Hanson* | 38,129 | 54.66 | +19.31 |
| Labor | Les Scott | 31,622 | 45.34 | −19.31 |
| Independent gain from Labor | | Swing | +19.31 | |

*Pauline Hanson had been disendorsed as the Liberal candidate and ran as an independent, but she remained a Liberal on the ballot paper.

=== Petrie ===
1996 Australian federal election: Petrie
| Party | Candidate | Votes | % | ±% |
|---|---|---|---|---|
| Liberal | Teresa Gambaro | 38,415 | 51.23 | +11.51 |
| Labor | Gary Johns | 27,280 | 36.38 | −8.24 |
| Democrats | Zillah Jackson | 4,918 | 6.56 | +2.23 |
| Greens | Dell Jones | 1,995 | 2.66 | +0.19 |
| Independent | Nat Karmichael | 1,148 | 1.53 | +1.53 |
| Independent | Leonard Matthews | 382 | 0.51 | +0.51 |
| Independent | John Phillips | 337 | 0.45 | +0.45 |
| Independent | Kerry Hay | 275 | 0.37 | +0.37 |
| Indigenous Peoples | Keryn Jackson | 236 | 0.31 | +0.31 |
| Total formal votes | | 74,986 | 97.51 | +0.06 |
| Informal votes | | 1,916 | 2.49 | −0.06 |
| Turnout | | 76,902 | 95.04 | −0.90 |
Two-party-preferred result
| Liberal | Teresa Gambaro | 43,172 | 57.70 | +9.85 |
| Labor | Gary Johns | 31,651 | 42.30 | −9.85 |
| Liberal gain from Labor | | Swing | +9.85 | |

=== Rankin ===
1996 Australian federal election: Rankin
| Party | Candidate | Votes | % | ±% |
|---|---|---|---|---|
| Labor | David Beddall | 31,869 | 45.00 | −9.93 |
| Liberal | Amanda Scott | 29,046 | 41.02 | +10.39 |
| Democrats | Alan Dickson | 6,050 | 8.54 | +3.52 |
| Greens | Richard Nielsen | 1,977 | 2.79 | +0.07 |
| Indigenous Peoples | Rosemary Bell | 976 | 1.38 | +1.38 |
| Independent | Xuan Thu Nguyen | 899 | 1.27 | +1.27 |
| Total formal votes | | 70,817 | 96.61 | −0.52 |
| Informal votes | | 2,488 | 3.39 | +0.52 |
| Turnout | | 73,305 | 93.51 | −1.65 |
Two-party-preferred result
| Labor | David Beddall | 36,278 | 51.35 | −11.69 |
| Liberal | Amanda Scott | 34,371 | 48.65 | +11.69 |
| Labor hold | | Swing | −11.69 | |

=== Ryan ===
1996 Australian federal election: Ryan
| Party | Candidate | Votes | % | ±% |
|---|---|---|---|---|
| Liberal | John Moore | 46,508 | 59.85 | +7.38 |
| Labor | Howard Nielsen | 19,526 | 25.13 | −6.15 |
| Democrats | Diane Watson | 7,850 | 10.10 | +4.09 |
| Greens | Willy Bach | 2,405 | 3.09 | −1.41 |
| Independent | Alan Skyring | 857 | 1.10 | +0.65 |
| Indigenous Peoples | Cheryl Cannon | 293 | 0.38 | +0.20 |
| Natural Law | Valerie Thurlow | 267 | 0.34 | +0.02 |
| Total formal votes | | 77,706 | 98.26 | +0.55 |
| Informal votes | | 1,374 | 1.74 | −0.55 |
| Turnout | | 79,080 | 95.19 | −0.83 |
Two-party-preferred result
| Liberal | John Moore | 51,712 | 66.87 | +6.15 |
| Labor | Howard Nielsen | 25,620 | 33.13 | −6.15 |
| Liberal hold | | Swing | +6.15 | |

=== Wide Bay ===
1996 Australian federal election: Wide Bay
| Party | Candidate | Votes | % | ±% |
|---|---|---|---|---|
| National | Warren Truss | 43,670 | 59.55 | +16.88 |
| Labor | Alan Holmes | 19,390 | 26.44 | −7.55 |
| Democrats | Pamela South | 5,415 | 7.38 | +3.78 |
| Independent | John Francis | 2,891 | 3.94 | +3.94 |
| Indigenous Peoples | Charlie Watson | 1,064 | 1.45 | +1.45 |
| One Australia | Wayne Skilton | 908 | 1.24 | +1.24 |
| Total formal votes | | 73,338 | 97.09 | −0.60 |
| Informal votes | | 2,201 | 2.91 | +0.60 |
| Turnout | | 75,539 | 95.92 | +0.00 |
Two-party-preferred result
| National | Warren Truss | 50,157 | 68.53 | +9.74 |
| Labor | Alan Holmes | 23,037 | 31.47 | −9.74 |
| National hold | | Swing | +9.74 | |

== See also ==
- Results of the 1996 Australian federal election (House of Representatives)
- Members of the Australian House of Representatives, 1996–1998
