= Margaret Lawrence =

Margaret Lawrence may refer to:

- Margaret Lawrence (actress) (1889–1929), American actress
- Margaret Lawrence (curler), see 1994 Scott Tournament of Hearts
- Margaret Morgan Lawrence (1914–2019), American pediatric psychiatrist
- Maggie Lawrence, see Candidates of the 1996 Australian federal election

In fiction:

- Margaret Lawrence, character in The Rising Shore—Roanoke
- Maggie Lawrence, character in Gloria (TV series)

== See also ==
- Margaret Laurence (1926–1987), Canadian author
- Margaret Laurence (actress) (born 1951), Australian television actress
- Marguerite Laurence, Canadian child actress
