= Reclaim Australia (disambiguation) =

Reclaim Australia are a far-right Australian nationalist protest group.

Reclaim Australia may also refer to:

- Reclaim Australia (album), a 2016 album by A.B. Original
- Reclaim Australia: Reduce Immigration, a defunct political party that was active from 1996 to 1999
