= Australian Bill of Rights Group =

Australian political party

The Australian Bill of Rights Group was a minor Australian political party agitating for the creation of a Bill of Rights for Australia. Formally registered on 19 December 1995, it operated until it was deregistered for having fewer than 500 members on 15 November 1999. At the 1996 federal election it contested the Senate in New South Wales, Victoria and Queensland on joint tickets with the Republican Party of Australia; among its candidates were future New South Wales Legislative Councillor Peter Breen, who headed the ticket in New South Wales. The party ran a single ticket in Victoria in the 1998 federal election.

== See also ==
- Constitution of Australia
- Human rights in Australia
- TNL (political party)
