= The Rising Shore—Roanoke =

2007 novel by Deborah Homsher

- Front cover
- Author: Deborah Homsher
- Language: English
- Subject: Roanoke Colony
- Genre: Historical fiction
- Publisher: Blue Hull Press
- Publication date: January 10, 2007
- Pages: 280
- ISBN: 0-9790516-0-6

The Rising Shore—Roanoke is a novel about the Lost Colony of Roanoke Island by Deborah Homsher. The story of the Lost Colony is one of America's first great mysteries. Historically, John White, the leader of the venture, sailed home to London for supplies and then returned three years later to find no trace of the hundred colonists he'd left in Virginia except the word "Croatoan" carved in a post.

== Plot ==
The novel tells the story of two women who sailed from London to the shore of the Virginia wilderness in 1587. Elenor White Dare is daughter of the expedition's leader and mother of Virginia Dare, the first English child born on the American continent. Freshly married and newly pregnant when she boards the ship, Elenor longs to explore and paint pictures of the New World, as her father has done, but her dreams are frustrated by her status as John White's daughter – not his son. Margaret Lawrence, her bold young servant, blazes her own path to independence as a member of the struggling colony that settles on Roanoke Island.

The adventures of Elenor and Margaret begin in Elizabethan London, cross the Atlantic, pass through the Caribbean, and climax in the Outer Banks region of North America.

== Reception ==
Mary Kay Bird-Guilliams of Library Journal praised the book, writing, "The invented portions are believable, including the ending—you can debate the details, but it seems quite logical. ... most public libraries will want to purchase for readers who enjoyed Jane Smiley's The All-True Travels and Adventures of Lidie Newton." In a positive review, The Virginian-Pilot's Mary Ellen Riddle said, "What truly sings in Homsher's work is her amazing ability to understand life. On every page, she analyzes it with a powerful voice. One is astounded to find that the words are unique and apt."

Midwest Book Review's Small Press Bookwatch called the book "an enthralling saga of a colony presumed doomed", while The Pilot's Janis Cooke Newman stated "Homsher has a way with words".
