= 1995 Liberal Party of Australia leadership spill =

1995 Liberal Party of Australia Leadership spill
- 30 January 1995
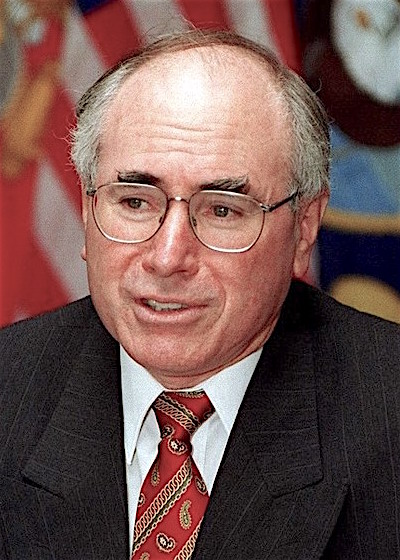
Candidate	John Howard
Caucus vote	Unopposed
Seat	Bennelong (NSW)
Leader before election
Alexander Downer
Elected Leader
John Howard

A leadership spill of the federal parliamentary leader of the Liberal Party of Australia was held on 30 January 1995 after the resignation of Alexander Downer following several months of poor personal ratings for him. John Howard was elected unopposed in a vote of Liberal Party Members of Parliament. Howard thus became the Leader of the Opposition in the Parliament of Australia. Peter Costello remained deputy leader. Howard became the first Liberal leader to be elected unopposed since Harold Holt in 1966.

== Background ==
By January 1995, internal Liberal Party polling showed that with Downer as leader, the Coalition had a slim chance of holding its marginal seats in the next election, let alone of winning government. In mid-January Downer began negotiating in with former leader now back-bencher John Hewson, but this resulted in Hewson publicly declaring he wanted the shadow Treasury portfolio which meant Downer would have to sack deputy leader Peter Costello from the position. On 30 January 1995, he resigned as Liberal Leader.

== Candidates ==
- John Howard, Shadow Minister for Industrial Relations, Manager of Opposition Business in the House and Member for Bennelong

== Aftermath ==
Downer pledged his support to Howard and said he would "kneecap" anyone who undermined Howard's second attempt at winning the prime ministership. This would be the last leadership vote for the Liberal Party for the next 12 years, after having 8 votes over the previous 12.
