= Tom Wheelwright =

Australian politician

Senator for New South Wales
- In office 24 May 1995 – 30 June 1996
- Preceded by: Stephen Loosley

Personal details
- Born: 29 April 1953 (age 73) Huddersfield, England
- Party: Australian Labor Party
- Education: University of New South Wales

Thomas Clive Wheelwright (born 29 April 1953) is a financial economist and Australian politician. He was an Australian Labor Party member of the Australian Senate from May 1995 until June 1996, representing New South Wales.

Wheelwright was born at Huddersfield in England. His family migrated to Australia in 1961, living initially in Kingsgrove in Sydney, where he attended Kingsgrove Primary School, and then Croydon and Blackburn in Melbourne, where he attended Box Hill High School. He subsequently returned to Sydney, where he studied politics and economics at the University of New South Wales and then an MBA with the Australian Graduate School of Management majoring in finance and corporate strategy. He was a university tutor from 1978 to 1981, the Education and Research Officer for the New South Wales Branch of the Labor Party from 1981 to 1984, a stockbroker from 1984 to 1989 and Group Economist for Legal & General Life Ltd from 1989 to 1994. He was appointed Senior Political Adviser to Prime Minister Paul Keating (1994) and Senior Economic Advisor to Communications & Arts Minister Michael Lee (1994 to 1995). He was involved with the Labor Party from the early 1970s and during the early 1980s was a regular commentator on Labor Party affairs with the ABC's AM radio program.

Wheelwright was appointed to the Senate on 24 May 1995 to fill the casual vacancy caused by the resignation of Senator Stephen Loosley. He was preselected with the strong support of the Labor Right faction over the wishes of Keating, who advocated a cross-factional deal to install George Campbell in the vacancy. In September 1995, he was one of nine international parliamentarians to travel to Moruroa atoll to protest French nuclear testing in the Pacific; Wheelwright declared that it was time for "direct personal action" on the issue, and stated that he was willing to break the law, enter the exclusion zone and stand on the test platform if necessary. Wheelwright was preselected in the marginal third position on the Labor ticket for the 1996 federal election and was widely tipped to face an "uphill battle" for re-election amidst poor Labor polling. He was defeated at the election and left office with the expiry of his term on 30 June 1996.

After his political defeat, Wheelwright variously formed his own consulting firm, 'Politic', worked as economic adviser to deputy opposition leader and shadow treasury spokesperson Gareth Evans, Asia Pacific Public Affairs Director for Lucent Technologies in Hong Kong and then as a Singapore-based Global Senior Vice-president for Deutsche Post DHL.
