= Beryl Evans =

Australian politician

Member of the New South Wales Legislative Council

The Honourable
- In office 30 April 1984 – 3 March 1995

Councillor of the Coolah Shire
- In office 1962–1971

Personal details
- Born: 25 February 1922
- Died: 16 May 2006 (aged 84)
- Party: The Seniors (1995-1999)
- Other political affiliations: Liberal (1973-1995)

Beryl Alice Evans OAM (née Williams; 25 February 1922 – 16 May 2006) was an Australian politician.

== Early career ==
Born to David Reginald Williams and Mabel Lawson in Sydney, she was educated at Methodist Ladies' College in Burwood before joining the Royal Australian Air Force (Women's Auxiliary Australian Air Force) on 12 November 1942. She was a drill and physical training instructor, rising to the rank of Sergeant before her commission in 1944. When she was discharged on 25 September 1945 she had attained the rank of section officer.

She was subsequently a farmer and grazier; she had married Kenneth Graham Bowman in 1944, with whom she had two sons, Christopher and Gawain. In 1962 she was elected to Coolah Shire Council, where she remained until 1971. She was the unsuccessful Liberal candidate for the state electorate of Burrendong in 1973. Her first marriage ended in divorce in the early 1970s, and on 30 July 1976 she married Richard Evans, a Liberal member of the New South Wales Legislative Council until 1978.

== State politics ==
In 1984, Evans was elected to the Legislative Council as a Liberal. She remained in the council until 1995, when she was removed from the Liberal ticket and contested the election under the designation "The Seniors". She was unsuccessful. She also contested the Senate in 1996 for her new party, but was again unsuccessful, and she retired from politics. The Seniors was deregistered by the Australian Electoral Commission in January 1999, having not contested the 1998 federal election.

Evans was awarded the Centenary Medal on 1 January 2001 for "service to the veterans' community". She subsequently received the Medal of the Order of Australia (OAM) in the 2006 Australia Day Honours for "service to the community through a range of ex-service, parliamentary and local government organisations".
