= Karen Alexander (environmentalist) =

Australian environmentalist

Karen Ruth Alexander OAM
- Born: Melbourne, Australia
- Education: Monash University
- Occupation: Environmentalist
- Years active: 1988−present
- Known for: Co-founder of Tasmanian Wilderness Society

Karen Ruth Alexander OAM (born 1948) is an Australian environmentalist who was one of the founding members of the Tasmanian Wilderness Society.

== Biography ==
Karen Alexander was born in Melbourne. She studied mathematics at Monash University before studying geology in Tasmania, eventually receiving a Bachelor of Applied Science in Canberra. She was a co-founder of the Melbourne branch of the Tasmanian Wilderness Society, dedicated to campaigning against the proposed Franklin Dam. Bob Brown described her as the "driving force in Melbourne behind turning the Franklin River campaign into a national issue". When the Wilderness Society established itself nationally, Alexander was a co-director.

During 1988, she worked with the United Nations Environment Program, after which she became environment manager for the Australian Conservation Foundation. She later completed her master's degree at the University of Western Australia. Involved in the Australian Greens, she was also president of Bush Heritage Australia from 2000 to 2004. In 2005, she took up her current position in the Victorian National Parks Association. Alexander was awarded the Medal of the Order of Australia (OAM) on 8 June 2015 for "service to conservation and the environment, and to the community."
