= Reclaim Australia: Reduce Immigration =

Australian political party

Reclaim Australia: Reduce Immigration (RARI) was a minor Australian political party that was active from 1996 to 1999. The party advocated reducing Immigration to Australia and was associated with the far right of Australian politics. The party was deregistered due to a lack of members, and was largely displaced by the more successful One Nation and, to a lesser extent, Australians Against Further Immigration (AAFI). The party's best electoral result was in the by-election following the retirement of former prime minister Paul Keating from the federal seat of Blaxland. In this by-election, the Liberal Party did not field a candidate to oppose the sitting Labor Party, and, although RARI finished behind AAFI on the primary vote, on preferences RARI was able to come second in the seat.

== Federal parliament ==
House of Representatives
Election year	# of overall votes	% of overall vote	# of overall seats won	+/–	Government
1996	6,457	0.6(#12/18)	0 / 150	▲0	

Senate
Election year	# of overall votes	% of overall vote	# of overall seats won	# of overall seats	+/–	Notes
1996	44,545	0.41(#10/22)	0 / 40	0 / 76	▲0	
1998	8,019	0.07(#21/29)	0 / 40	0 / 76	▼0	

== See also ==
- Far-right politics in Australia
- Australian nationalism
- List of political parties in Australia
- Love Australia or Leave
