= One Australia Party =

Former minor Australian political party

The One Australia Party was a minor Australian political party that was registered on 19 December 1995 and deregistered on 31 May 1999. It contested the 1996 federal election without success. Many of its candidates were drawn from the defunct Confederate Action Party.

== Ideology ==
The One Australia Party was a conservative organisation. The politics of One Australia were based on populism and economic nationalism. One Australia has been accused of holding racism as one of its key ideologies, along with those mentioned above. The agenda of the One Australia Party was said to be "openly racist". Dr. Sev Ozdowski cites One Nation founder Pauline Hanson's maiden speech to parliament to support the claim that One Australia held anti-Asian sentiments. R. J. B. Bosworth notes that "at least some" of the Party's backers held antisemitic and anti-Aboriginal sentiments.

== Federal parliament ==
House of Representatives
Election year	# of overall votes	% of overall vote	# of overall seats won	+/–
1996	3,159	0.03(#12/15)	0 / 150	▲0

Senate
Election year	# of overall votes	% of overall vote	# of overall seats won	# of overall seats	+/–	Notes
1996	3,638	0.03 (#18/20)	0 / 40	0 / 76	▲0	
1998	7,572	0.07 (#20/?)	0 / 40	0 / 76	▲0	
