= Australia's Indigenous Peoples Party =

Australian political party

- Registered: 13 January 1993
- Ideology: Indigenous rights
- National affiliation: Australia
- Major Election Contested: 1993 federal election
- Deregistered: 1999

Australia's Indigenous Peoples Party was an Australian political party. It was registered on 13 January 1993 prior to contesting the 1993 federal election, when its results were mediocre. The party was deregistered in 1999. The party was associated with the Australian indigenous community.
