= Australian Women's Party (1995) =

Political party

The Australian Women's Party was a minor Australian feminist party that was first registered with the Australian Electoral Commission on 19 December 1995 and was deregistered on 22 April 2003. Its main platform consisted of a constitutional alteration to ensure equal representation of men and women at all levels of government, included in the republic debate.

== See also ==
- Feminism in Australia
- Politics of Australia
