= Republican Party of Australia =

Political party in Australia advocating the establishment of a republic

- Founder: Peter Consandine
- Founded: 1982; 44 years ago
- Dissolved: 2021 (voluntarily deregistered)
- Preceded by: Australian Republican Party (est. 1956)
- Ideology: Republicanism (Australian)

Website
- www.therepublicans.com.au

The Republican Party of Australia was a minor Australian political party dedicated to ending the country's monarchy and establishing a republic. It was formed in 1982 and registered by the Australian Electoral Commission on a few occasions prior to being voluntarily deregistered in 2021. It was not linked with the Australian Republic Movement.

== History ==
=== Australian Republican Party (1949–1951) ===
The Australian Republican Party was formed in the late 1940s and contested the 1949 and 1951 federal elections.

The party's only known candidate at both of those elections included William McCristal, one of the most prolific unsuccessful candidates for political office in Australian history.

=== Australian Republican Party (1956–1970s) ===
Another Australian Republican Party was formed in 1956 in response to the playing of "God Save the Queen" at the 1956 Melbourne Olympics. It was based in Melbourne, but by 1970 had branches in New South Wales and Queensland. It suffered from "low membership, internal division and a potentially divisive range of policies beyond just republicanism. In 1964, the party proposed a massive expansion of the welfare state funded by the deregulation of gambling. It was also in favour of the Vietnam War, U.S. bases on Australian soil, conscription, and quotas for Asian immigration.

The 1973 New South Wales state election was the first time that the Republican Party contested an election outside Victoria. In 1974, the party elected Doreen Storry as its leader. It was reported that she was the first woman to lead an Australian political party. As well as supporting republicanism, the party was said to oppose "any form of socialism, foreign equity or monopolistic practices in Australia".

=== Republican Party of Australia (1982–2021) ===
The most recent version of the Republican Party of Australia was founded in Sydney in 1982 by Peter Consandine. By the 1990s, the party's platform called for the reform of the Australian court system and for the reintroduction of one-cent and two-cent coins. The Republican Party of Australia was first registered for federal elections by the Australian Electoral Commission (AEC) in 1992. It contested the 2004 federal election, but was not registered at the time of the 2007 election, although some of its members stood as independent candidates.

The party was re-registered on 9 July 2013, but was deregistered on 15 February 2016 after failing to demonstrate the required number of members. The party's registered officer appealed that decision on 2 March 2016, but it was affirmed by the Electoral Commission on 24 August 2016. The party applied for federal registration again in 2017, and the party was approved on 31 July of that year. The party was voluntarily deregistered on the 20 July 2021.

== See also ==
- Republicanism in Australia
