= Australians Against Further Immigration =

Australian political party (1989–2008)

- Founder: Rodney Spencer; Robyn Spencer
- Founded: 1989; 36 years ago
- Dissolved: 2008; 17 years ago
- Ideology: Australian nationalism Right-wing populism Anti-immigration
- Political position: Far-right

Australians Against Further Immigration (AAFI) was a far-right Australian political party founded by radiologist Rodney Spencer and his wife Robyn. The party described itself as "eco-nationalist", was opposed to mass immigration and aimed for zero net migration.

AAFI stood candidates at both state and federal level, but never won a seat. The party said it was a mainstream organisation, and sought to distance itself from extremist organisations such as the Australian League of Rights and from the Citizens Electoral Council. In 1994, Franca Arena, then a Labor member of the New South Wales Legislative Council, denounced the party in the New South Wales parliament.

In by-elections in Mackellar and Warringah (safe Liberal seats on the Northern Beaches of Sydney) in 1994, Labor MP Graeme Campbell urged electors to vote for Australians Against Further Immigration (AAFI).

The party was deregistered by the Australian Electoral Commission in December 2005, as lacking the minimum 500 members required to be registered as a political party. It contested the 2007 New South Wales state election, but was also deregistered at the state level not long after.

== Federal parliament ==
House of Representatives
Election year	# of overall votes	% of overall vote	# of overall seats won	+/–
1993	3,587	0.03 (#13/15)	0 / 150	▲0
1996	73,023	0.67 (#6/18)	0 / 150	▲0
2001	12,033	0.10 (#11/20)	0 / 150	▼0

Senate
Election year	# of overall votes	% of overall vote	# of overall seats won	# of overall seats	+/–
1990	19,439	0.20 (#12/17)	0 / 40	0 / 76	▲0
1993	46,464	0.44 (#9/19)	0 / 40	0 / 76	▲0
1996	137,604	1.26 (#6/22)	0 / 40	0 / 76	▲0
2001	21,012	0.18 (#18/29)	0 / 40	0 / 76	▼0
2004	11,508	0.10 (#23/30)	0 / 40	0 / 76	▼0

== See also ==
- Far-right politics in Australia
- Kiwis Against Further Immigration
