= Electoral results for the Australian Senate in New South Wales =

This is a list of electoral results for the Australian Senate in New South Wales since Federation in 1901.

== Election results ==
=== Elections in the 2020s ===
==== 2025 ====
The New South Wales senators whose terms expire due to this election are as follows:

- Hollie Hughes (LP)
- Tony Sheldon (ALP)
- Andrew Bragg (LP)
- The Hon Tim Ayres (ALP)
- Perin Davey (NATS)
- Mehreen Faruqi (GRN)

2025 Australian federal election: Senate, New South Wales
Party	Candidate	Votes	%	±%
Quota		609,262		
Labor	1. Tony Sheldon (elected 1); 2. Tim Ayres (elected 3); 3. Emilija Beljic; 4. Victoria McGregor; 5. Sharon Sewell; 6. Heather Roarty	1,799,948	37.78	+7.34
Liberal/National Coalition	1. Andrew Bragg (elected 2); 2. Jessica Collins (elected 4); 3. Perin Davey; 4. Hollie Hughes; 5. Juliana McArthur; 6. Rhiannon Brinsmead	1,411,832	29.63	–6.91
Greens	1. Mehreen Faruqi (elected 5); 2. Eddie Lloyd; 3. Sujan Selventhiran; 4. Barbara Bloch; 5. Ethan Floyd; 6. Rachael Jacobs	531,721	11.16	−0.38
One Nation	1. Warwick Stacey; 2. Rebecca Thompson	287,478	6.03	+1.89
Legalise Cannabis	1. Miles Hunt; 2. Michael Balderstone; 3. Tia Elliston	144,445	3.30	+0.70
Trumpet of Patriots	1. Silvana Nile; 2. Andrew Robertson; 3. Michelle Martin	113,329	2.38	+2.35
Libertarian–HEART–People First joint ticket	1. Craig Kelly; 2. Michael O'Neill; 3. Tracy Sedman; 4. Steve Christou; 5. Sonia Qutami	88,616	1.86	+1.86
Family First	1. Lyle Shelton; 2. Roseanne Masters	75,780	1.59	+1.59
Animal Justice	1. Emma Kerin; 2. Matt Stellino	56,776	1.17	−0.98
Christians	1. Asher Wolfson; 2. Duncan Gregg Fischer	55,617	1.17	+1.17
Lambie	1. Glenn Raymond Kolomeitz; 2. Nikhita Sahay	45,721	1.04	+1.04
Australia's Voice	1. Emanie Samira Darwiche; 2. Graham George	30,528	0.70	+0.70
Indigenous-Aboriginal	1. Owen D. Whyman; 2. Lawrence John Brooke	27,118	0.62	−0.19
Sustainable Australia	1. William Bourke; 2. Petra Campbell	15,492	0.33	−0.21
Fusion	1. Miles Whiticker; 2. Andrew Potts	14,109	0.32	−0.05
Socialist Alliance	1. Peter Boyle; 2. Andrew Chuter	12,269	0.26	+0.08
Citizens	1. Andy Schmulow; 2. Ann Lawler	10,146	0.21	−0.09
Group B	1. Max Boddy; 2. Warwick Dove	9,064	0.21	+0.21
Ungrouped	Kerrie Christina Harris; Shawn Price; Warren Grzic	4,036	0.09	−0.06
Total formal votes		4,378,527	92.93	−3.16
Informal votes		332,907	7.07	+3.16
Turnout		4,711,434	82.73	−8.64

#	Senator	Party
1	Tony Sheldon	Labor
2	Andrew Bragg	Liberal
3	Tim Ayres	Labor
4	Jessica Collins	Liberal
5	Mehreen Faruqi	Greens
6	TBD	TBD

Results are not final. Last updated on 12 May 2025 at 11:15 PM AEST.

==== 2022 ====
2022 Australian federal election: Senate, New South Wales
Party	Candidate	Votes	%	±%
Quota		685,818		
Liberal/National Coalition	1. Marise Payne (elected 1); 2. Ross Cadell (elected 3); 3. Jim Molan (elected 6); 4. Alison Penfold; 5. Mary-Lou Jarvis; 6. Vicky McGahey	1,763,074	36.73	–1.82
Labor	1. Deborah O'Neill (elected 2); 2. Jenny McAllister (elected 4); 3. Shireen Morris; 4. Mich-Elle Myers; 5. Kylie Rose; 6. James Warren-Smith	1,461,172	30.44	+0.62
Greens	1. David Shoebridge (elected 5); 2. Amanda Cohn; 3. Rochelle Flood; 4. Jane Scott; 5. Hawa Arya; 6. Danielle Wheeler	550,069	11.56	+2.73
One Nation	1. Kate McCulloch; 2. Colin Grigg; 3. Roger Smith	198,121	4.13	–0.83
United Australia	1. Dominic Martino; 2. Suellen Wrightson; 3. Wayne Moore; 4. Michelle Martin; 5. Johnny Yap; 6. Kevin Loughrey	162,262	3.38	+1.89
Legalise Cannabis	1. Michael Balderstone; 2. Gail Hester	125,001	2.60	+0.48
Animal Justice	1. Darren Brollo; 2. Julie Power	103,239	2.15	+1.11
Liberal Democrats	1. John Ruddick; 2. John Larter; 3. James Caldwell; 4. Mark Guest	101,780	2.12	+0.21
Shooters, Fishers, Farmers	1. Shane Djuric; 2. Desiree Gregory; 3. Brian Millgate; 4. Jeremy Crooks	91,143	1.90	–0.64
Indigenous-Aboriginal	1. Owen Whyman; 2. Lawrence Brooke	38,970	0.81	+0.81
Reason	1. Jane Caro; 2. Hannah Maher; 3. Diana Ryall	30,307	0.63	+0.63
Sustainable Australia	1. Georgia Lamb; 2. Suzanne De Vive	25,356	0.53	+0.10
Informed Medical Options	1. Michael O'Neill; 2. Marelle Burnum Burnum	18,409	0.38	+0.27
Fusion	1. Andrea Leong; 2. Ian Bryce	17,565	0.37	+0.37
Democrats	1. Steven Baty; 2. Suzanne Rogers; 3. Craig Richards	17,542	0.37	+0.18
Great Australian	1. Matthew Hopkins; 2. George Nohra	16,886	0.35	+0.18
Citizens	1. Kingsley Liu; 2. Ann Lawler	14,419	0.30	+0.27
Seniors United	1. Dessie Kocher; 2. Ray Bennie	12,790	0.27	+0.12
Federal ICAC Now	1. Ross Jones; 2. Gabrielle Anderson	10,769	0.22	+0.22
Australian Values	1. Selena Clancy; 2. Dave Gilbert	9,043	0.19	+0.19
TNL	1. Steve Keen; 2. Melissa Green	8,915	0.19	+0.19
Socialist Equality	1. Max Boddy; 2. Oscar Grenfell	8,587	0.18	+0.18
Socialist Alliance	1. Paula Sanchez; 2. Niko Leka; 3. Rachel Evans	8,184	0.17	+0.04
Ungrouped	Danny Lim; Julie Collins; Warren Grzic; Guitang Lu; William Lang	7,119	0.15	+0.37
Total formal votes		4,800,722	96.09	–0.37
Informal votes		195,388	3.91	+0.37
Turnout		4,996,110	91.37	–1.28
Party total seats			Seats	±
Liberal			4	▼1
National			2	▲1
Labor			4	▼1
Greens			2	▲1

#	Senator	Party
1	Marise Payne	Liberal
2	Deborah O'Neill	Labor
3	Ross Cadell	National
4	Jenny McAllister	Labor
5	David Shoebridge	Greens
6	Jim Molan	Liberal

=== Elections in the 2010s ===
==== 2019 ====
2019 Australian federal election: Senate, New South Wales
Party	Candidate	Votes	%	±%
Quota		670,761		
Liberal/National Coalition	1. Hollie Hughes (elected 1); 2. Andrew Bragg (elected 3); 3. Perin Davey (elected 5); 4. Jim Molan; 5. Sam Farraway; 6. Michael Feneley	1,810,121	38.55	+2.70
Labor	1. Tony Sheldon (elected 2); 2. Tim Ayres (elected 4); 3. Jason Yat-Sen Li; 4. Simonne Pengelly; 5. Aruna Chandrala; 6. Charlie Sheahan	1,400,295	29.82	−1.46
Greens	1. Mehreen Faruqi (elected 6); 2. Rachael Jacobs; 3. Louise Steer; 4. Philippa Clark; 5. Roz Chia; 6. Sylvie Ellsmore	409,790	8.73	+1.32
One Nation	1. Kate McCulloch; 2. Barry Reed	232,865	4.96	+0.86
Shooters, Fishers, Farmers	1. Brett Cooke; 2. Wayne Borsak	119,408	2.54	+0.56
HEMP	1. Andrew Katelaris; 2. Michael Balderstone	99,644	2.12	+1.46
Liberal Democrats	1. Duncan Spender; 2. Codie Neville	89,833	1.91	−1.18
Christian Democrats	1. Silvana Nile; 2. Annie Wright	75,510	1.61	−1.09
United Australia	1. Brian Burston; 2. Christine Bernier; 3. Wayne Moore	69,911	1.49	+1.49
Animal Justice	1. Angela Pollard; 2. Michael Dello-Iacovo; 3. Carol Bellenger	48,989	1.04	+0.19
Rise Up Australia	1. Maree Nichols; 2. Vladimir Shigrov; 3. Leo Toop	33,269	0.71	+0.54
ICAN	1. Rod Bower; 2. Jim Tait; 3. Annette Schnider	26,734	0.57	+0.57
Democratic Labour	1. Daniel Hanna; 2. Benedict O'Brien	26,439	0.56	−0.59
Health Australia	1. Molly Knight; 2. Jason Fairbairn	23,181	0.49	−0.69
Conservatives	1. Sophie York; 2. Riccardo Bosi	23,152	0.49	+0.49
Sustainable Australia	1. William Bourke; 2. Warren Grzic	20,235	0.43	+0.26
Science	1. Andrea Leong; 2. Eve Slavich; 3. Peter Furness; 4. Greg Parker	18,972	0.40	+0.40
Conservative National	1. Carolyn Thomson; 2. Gary Young; 3. Paul Swann; 4. Ian Wharton	17,911	0.38	+0.38
Affordable Housing	1. Andrew Potts; 2. Anthony Ziebell	17,330	0.37	+0.37
Pirate	1. John August; 2. Sara Joyce	16,887	0.36	+0.11
Women's Party	1. Divvi De Vendre; 2. Penelope Lloyd	16,461	0.35	+0.35
Small Business	1. Angela Vithoulkas; 2. Fiona Douskou	14,217	0.30	+0.30
People's Party	1. Steven Georgantis; 2. Susan Tsangaris	11,931	0.25	+0.25
Democrats	1. Peter Mailler; 2. Chris Buckman	8,735	0.19	+0.19
Great Australian	1. Matthew Hopkins; 2. Karen Burge	7,880	0.17	+0.17
Australian Workers	1. Mark Ptolemy; 2. Maria Nguyen	7,684	0.16	+0.16
Better Families	1. Jewell Drury; 2. Peter Moujalli	7,550	0.16	+0.16
Seniors United	1. Paul Gerantonis; 2. Helen Ducker	6,999	0.15	−0.34
Climate Action!	1. Nick Debenham; 2. Guy Forsyth	6,417	0.14	+0.00
Together	1. Mark Swivel; 2. Belinda Kinkead; 3. Kate McDowell	6,127	0.13	+0.13
Socialist Alliance	1. Susan Price; 2. Joel McAlear	6,058	0.13	+0.01
Involuntary Medication Objectors	1. Michael O'Neill; 2. Marelle Burnum Burnum	5,024	0.11	+0.11
VOTEFLUX.ORG	1. Ben Rushton; 2. Joanne Cotterill	3,562	0.08	−0.20
Socialist Equality	1. Richard Phillips; 2. John Davis	2,100	0.04	−0.03
Citizens Electoral Council	1. Ann Lawler; 2. Robert Butler	1,478	0.03	−0.01
Ungrouped	John Carmichael; Chifley Haddad; Phil Baker; Graeme Doyle; John John Romanous; Hussein Faraj; Russell Barber; Sandra Lazarus; Glenn Wagner; David O'Brien; Wayne Bell; Michael Kirkwood; Pamela Johnstone; Carolyn Crossman	2,627	0.06	−0.09
Total formal votes		4,695,326	95.72	+0.25
Informal votes		210,146	4.28	−0.25
Turnout		4,905,472	92.65	+0.10

Elected	#	Senator	Party
2019	1	Hollie Hughes	Liberal
2019	2	Tony Sheldon	Labor
2019	3	Andrew Bragg	Liberal
2019	4	Tim Ayres	Labor
2019	5	Perin Davey	Nationals
2019	6	Mehreen Faruqi	Greens
2016
2016	1	Marise Payne	Liberal
2016	2	Kristina Keneally	Labor
2016	3	Arthur Sinodinos	Liberal
2016	4	Jenny McAllister	Labor
2016	5	Concetta Fierravanti-Wells	Liberal
2016	6	Deborah O'Neill	Labor

==== 2016 ====
2016 Australian federal election: Senate, New South Wales
Party	Candidate	Votes	%	±%
Quota		345,554		
Liberal/National Coalition	1. Marise Payne (elected 1); 2. Arthur Sinodinos (elected 3); 3. Fiona Nash (elected 5) (Note: Nash was declared to be ineligible by the Court of Disputed Returns because she was a dual citizen of the United Kingdom. A special recount resulted in Jim Molan being declared to have been elected.); 4. Concetta Fierravanti-Wells (elected 7); 5. John Williams (elected 10); 6. Hollie Hughes; 7. Jim Molan; 8. Wes Fang; 9. Sang Ok; 10. Sarah Richards; 11. Fiona Leviny; 12. Victoria McGahey	1,610,626	35.85	+1.65
Labor	1. Sam Dastyari (elected 2); 2. Jenny McAllister (elected 4); 3. Deborah O'Neill (elected 6); 4. Doug Cameron (elected 8); 5. Tara Moriarty; 6. Vivien Thomson; 7. Shuo Zhou; 8. Jagath Bandara; 9. Miriam Rizvi; 10. Mary O'Sullivan; 11. Paul Yi-Wen Han; 12. Alexandra Costello	1,405,088	31.28	−0.28
Greens	1. Lee Rhiannon (elected 9); 2. Michael Osborne; 3. Jane Oakley; 4. Jananie Janarthana; 5. Marika Kontellis; 6. Gareth Bryant; 7. Christina Ho; 8. Kathryn Maiden; 9. Ray Goodlass; 10. Christine Donayre; 11. Kate Parker; 12. Sarah Fernandes	332,860	7.41	−0.38
One Nation	1. Brian Burston (elected 11); 2. Dean Mackin; 3. Christine Bernier	184,012	4.10	+2.88
Liberal Democrats	1. David Leyonhjelm (elected 12); 2. Sam Kennard	139,007	3.09	−6.41
Christian Democrats	1. Nella Hall; 2. Peter Rahme; 3. Deborah Lions; 4. Andrew Phillips; 5. Tania Piper; 6. Beth Smith; 7. Dave Vincent; 8. Colin Broadbridge; 9. Rhonda Avasalu; 10. Archie Lea; 11. Lena El-Daghl; 12. Charles Knox	121,379	2.70	+1.04
Shooters, Fishers, Farmers	1. Karl Houseman; 2. Peter Johnson	88,837	1.98	+0.73
Xenophon	1. Aidan Dalgliesh; 2. Anthony Dona	80,111	1.78	+1.78
Health Australia	1. Andrew Patterson; 2. Leanne Paff	53,154	1.18	+1.18
Family First	1. Phil Jobe; 2. Sally Vincent; 3. Simon McCaffrey	53,027	1.18	+0.80
Democratic Labour	1. Paul McCormack; 2. Dawn Willis	51,510	1.15	−0.39
Animal Justice	1. Lynda Stoner; 2. Gordon Elkington	37,991	0.85	+0.37
Sex Party	1. Ross Fitzgerald; 2. Sue Raye	30,038	0.67	−0.35
Liberty Alliance	1. Kirralie Smith; 2. Gary Anderson	29,795	0.66	+0.66
HEMP	1. Jason Olbourne; 2. Andrew Katelaris	29,510	0.66	−0.03
Justice	1. Ken Stevens; 2. Adam Washbourne	26,720	0.59	+0.59
Seniors United	1. Gillian Evans; 2. Kerry Koliadis; 3. Chris Osborne	22,213	0.49	+0.49
Drug Law Reform	1. Ray Thorpe; 2. Stacey Dowson	20,883	0.46	+0.37
Science–Cyclists joint ticket	1. James Jansson; 2. Eve Slavich; 3. Ingrid Ralph; 4. Jai Cooper	18,367	0.41	+0.41
Lambie	1. Allan Thomas; 2. Bruce Relph; 3. Mitch Carr	16,502	0.37	+0.37
Motoring Enthusiasts	1. Rob Bryden; 2. Daniel Kirkness	16,356	0.36	−0.03
Voluntary Euthanasia	1. Shayne Higson; 2. Janise Farrell	15,198	0.34	+0.00
VOTEFLUX.ORG	1. Steven Lopez; 2. Nathan Spataro	12,578	0.28	+0.28
Arts	1. Barry Keldoulis; 2. Nicholas Gledhill	11,805	0.26	+0.26
Pirate	1. Sam Kearns; 2. Darren McIntosh	11,418	0.25	−0.08
Renewable Energy	1. Peter Breen; 2. Susan Perrow	8,936	0.20	+0.20
Sustainable Australia	1. William Bourke; 2. Greg Graham	7,723	0.17	+0.10
Rise Up Australia	1. Brian Tucker; 2. Maree Nichols	7,538	0.17	+0.07
Online Direct Democracy	1. Berge Der Sarkissian; 2. Arthur Emmett	6,353	0.14	+0.08
Defence Veterans	1. Raymond Bennie; 2. Mark Bradbury	5,857	0.13	+0.13
Socialist Alliance	1. Ken Canning; 2. Susan Price; 3. Sharlene Leroy-Dyer; 4. Howard Byrnes	5,382	0.12	+0.06
Katter's Australian	1. Tom Harris; 2. Anthony Belcastro	4,316	0.10	−0.34
Group G	1. Teresa van Lieshout; 2. Colin Bennett	3,871	0.09	+0.09
CountryMinded	1. Christopher Buckman; 2. Methuen Morgan	3,153	0.07	+0.07
Socialist Equality	1. James Cogan; 2. John Davis	2,933	0.07	+0.03
Palmer United	1. Suellen Wrightson; 2. Robert Marks; 3. Cara Donnelly	2,805	0.06	−3.33
Mature Australia	1. Paul Quinn; 2. Gregory Frearson	2,805	0.06	+0.10
Secular	1. Ian Bryce; 2. Dee Ellis	2,773	0.06	−0.01
Non-Custodial Parents	1. Eric Greening; 2. Andy Thompson	2,102	0.05	+0.02
Citizens Electoral Council	1. Ann Lawler; 2. Robert Butler	1,895	0.04	+0.04
Progressives	1. Allan Quartly; 2. Ash Rose	1,817	0.04	+0.04
Ungrouped	Warren Grzic; Jane Ward; Liam Munday; Bryan Lambert; Peter Wallace; James Wright; Joanna Rzetelski; Danny Lim; Maree Ann Cruze; Stephen Muller; Peter Muller; John Cooper; Santa Spruce-Peet-Boyd; David Ash; Nigel Smith; Ron Poulsen; Peter Gooley; Nick Chapman; Leonard Brown; Richelle Tsay	2,953	0.07	+0.07
Total formal votes		4,492,197	95.47	−1.21
Informal votes		213,073	4.53	+1.21
Turnout		4,705,270	92.49	−1.47

#	Senator	Party
1	Marise Payne	Liberal
2	Sam Dastyari	Labor
3	Arthur Sinodinos	Liberal
4	Jenny McAllister	Labor
5	Fiona Nash	Nationals
6	Deborah O'Neill	Labor
7	Concetta Fierravanti-Wells	Liberal
8	Doug Cameron	Labor
9	Lee Rhiannon	Greens
10	John Williams	Nationals
11	Brian Burston	One Nation
12	David Leyonhjelm	LDP

==== 2013 ====
2013 Australian federal election: Senate, New South Wales
Party	Candidate	Votes	%	±%
Quota		625,164		
Liberal/National Coalition	1. Marise Payne (elected 1); 2. John Williams (elected 3); 3. Arthur Sinodinos (elected 6); 4. Alan Hay; 5. Carolyn Cameron; 6. Angus Cameron	1,496,752	34.20	−4.75
Labor	1. Bob Carr (elected 2); 2. Doug Cameron (elected 4); 3. Ursula Stephens; 4. Glenn Kolomeitz; 5. Nuatali Nelmes; 6. Bhupinder Chhibber	1,381,047	31.56	−4.98
Liberal Democrats	1. David Leyonhjelm (elected 5); 2. Jeffrey Pettett	415,901	9.50	+7.19
Greens	1. Cate Faehrmann; 2. James Ryan; 3. Penny Blatchford; 4. Christina Ho; 5. Amanda Findley; 6. Ben Spies-Butcher	340,941	7.79	−2.90
Palmer United	1. Matthew Adamson; 2. Suellen Wrightson	148,281	3.39	+3.39
Christian Democrats	1. Robyn Peebles; 2. Deborah Lions; 3. Peter Rahme; 4. Caroline Fraser; 5. Ross Clifford	72,544	1.66	−0.28
Democratic Labour	1. Simon McCaffrey; 2. Daniel Hanna	67,549	1.54	+0.79
Shooters and Fishers	1. Karl Houseman; 2. Jim Muirhead	54,658	1.25	−1.08
One Nation	1. Pauline Hanson; 2. Kate McCulloch; 3. Aaron Plumb	53,292	1.22	+0.66
Sex Party	1. Graeme Dunne; 2. Sue Raye	44,830	1.02	−0.75
Wikileaks	1. Kellie Tranter; 2. Alison Broinowski	36,399	0.83	+0.83
HEMP	1. BJ Futter; 2. Jason Olbourne	30,003	0.69	+0.69
Animal Justice	1. Mark Pearson; 2. Kate Vickers	21,215	0.48	+0.48
Fishing and Lifestyle	1. Bob Lowe; 2. Tim Dean	20,515	0.47	+0.47
Katter's Australian	1. Peter Mailler; 2. Tony Maka	19,101	0.44	+0.44
Motoring Enthusiasts	1. Gary Myers; 2. Daniel Kirkness	17,126	0.39	+0.39
Family First	1. Fiona Rossiter; 2. Stan Hurley	16,786	0.38	−0.56
Voluntary Euthanasia	1. Shayne Higson; 2. Loredana Mulhall	14,693	0.34	+0.34
Pirate	1. Brendan Molloy; 2. David Campbell	14,584	0.33	+0.33
Australian Independents	1. Bradley Tanks; 2. Stephen Hirst	9,771	0.22	+0.22
Democrats	1. Ronaldo Villaver; 2. Andrew Wallace	9,482	0.22	−0.46
Bullet Train	1. Tim Bohm; 2. Charlotte Glick	9,299	0.21	+0.21
Smokers Rights	1. Nicole Beiger; 2. James Whelan	8,389	0.19	+0.19
Climate Sceptics	1. Bill Koutalianos; 2. Mijina McDowall	7,913	0.18	−0.03
Outdoor Recreation	1. Rick Obrien; 2. Joaquim De Lima	7,771	0.18	+0.18
Carers Alliance	1. MaryLou Carter; 2. Maree Buckwalter	5,498	0.13	−0.15
Rise Up Australia	1. Norm Bishop; 2. Wayne Somerfield	4,320	0.10	+0.10
Future	1. James Jansson; 2. James Haggerty	4,243	0.10	+0.10
Stop CSG	1. Gordon Fraser; 2. Lynda Dean	4,225	0.10	+0.10
Drug Law Reform	1. Miles Hunt; 2. Tony Trimingham	4,062	0.09	+0.09
Australia First	1. Darrell Wallbridge; 2. Garth Fraser	3,626	0.08	+0.08
Stable Population	1. William Bourke; 2. Kris Spike	3,279	0.07	+0.07
Secular	1. Ian Bryce; 2. Christopher Owen	2,905	0.07	−0.03
Socialist Alliance	1. Jim McIlroy; 2. Reg Dare	2,728	0.06	−0.50
Australian Voice	1. Criselee Stevens; 2. Keith Francis; 3. Richard Black	2,587	0.06	+0.06
Senator Online	1. Tim Ferguson; 2. Tony Barry; 3. Don McKinnon	2,502	0.06	−0.01
Group AG	1. Tom Wang; 2. Daniel O'Toole	2,464	0.06	+0.06
Protectionist	1. Mark Grech; 2. Christian Johns	2,424	0.06	+0.06
Building Australia	1. Ray Brown; 2. Melanie Symington	2,309	0.05	−0.21
Group F	1. Andrew Whalan; 2. Peter Cooper	2,299	0.05	+0.05
Uniting Australia	1. Peter Simonds; 2. Tanya Watt	2,187	0.05	+0.05
Republican	1. Kerry McNally; 2. Jason Blake	1,932	0.04	+0.04
Socialist Equality	1. Nick Beams; 2. Zac Hambides	1,800	0.04	−0.05
Non-Custodial Parents	1. Andy Thompson; 2. Josh Thompson	1,357	0.03	−0.06
Independent	David Ash	227	0.01	+0.01
Ungrouped	Ron Poulsen	148	0.00	+0.00
Independent	John La Mela	114	0.00	+0.00
Independent	Sam Nathan	62	0.00	+0.00
Total formal votes		4,376,143	96.68	+0.85
Informal votes		150,239	3.32	−0.85
Turnout		4,526,382	93.95	−0.03

Elected	#	Senator	Party
2013	1	Marise Payne	Liberal
2013	2	Bob Carr	Labor
2013	3	John Williams	National
2013	4	Doug Cameron	Labor
2013	5	David Leyonhjelm	LDP
2013	6	Arthur Sinodinos	Liberal
2010
2010	1	Concetta Fierravanti-Wells	Liberal
2010	2	John Faulkner	Labor
2010	3	Bill Heffernan	Liberal
2010	4	Matt Thistlethwaite	Labor
2010	5	Fiona Nash	National
2010	6	Lee Rhiannon	Greens

==== 2010 ====
2010 Australian federal election: Senate, New South Wales
Party	Candidate	Votes	%	±%
Quota		593,218		
Liberal/National Coalition	1. Concetta Fierravanti-Wells (Lib) (elected 1); 2. Bill Heffernan (Lib) (elected 3); 3. Fiona Nash (Nat) (elected 5); 4. Hollie Hughes (Lib); 5. Joe Dennis (Nat); 6. George Bilic (Nat)	1,617,418	38.95	−0.38
Labor	1. John Faulkner (elected 2); 2. Matt Thistlethwaite (elected 4); 3. Steve Hutchins; 4. Anne Murnain; 5. Fiona Seaton; 6. Hugh McDermott	1,517,382	36.54	−5.53
Greens	1. Lee Rhiannon (elected 6); 2. Keith McIlroy; 3. Brami Jagatheeswaran; 4. Harriett Swift; 5. Simone Morrissey; 6. Dominic Kanak	443,913	10.69	+2.26
Shooters and Fishers	1. Jim Muirhead; 2. Alistair McGlashan	96,638	2.33	+2.33
Liberal Democrats	1. Glenn Druery; 2. Lucy Gabb; 3. Peter Stitt	95,752	2.31	+2.12
Christian Democrats	1. Paul Green; 2. Robyn Peebles; 3. Elaine Nile	80,376	1.94	−0.03
Sex Party	1. Marianne Leishman; 2. Huw Campbell; 3. Larissa Zimmerman	73,553	1.77	+1.77
Family First	1. Greg Swane; 2. Phil Lamb	39,123	0.94	+0.34
Democratic Labor	1. Simon McCaffrey; 2. Martin Cullen	30,939	0.75	−0.51
Democrats	1. Fiona Clancy; 2. Jen Mitchell	28,398	0.68	−0.21
One Nation	1. Andrew Webber; 2. John Brett	23,456	0.56	+0.15
Socialist Alliance	1. Rachel Evans; 2. Soubhi Iskander	23,392	0.56	+0.48
Carers Alliance	1. Marylou Carter; 2. Maree Buckwalter	11,496	0.28	−0.06
Building Australia	1. Ray Brown; 2. Michael O'Donnell	10,815	0.26	+0.26
Climate Sceptics	1. Bill Koutalianos; 2. Geoffrey Brown	8,737	0.21	+0.21
Group AE	1. Cheryl Kernot; 2. Simon Cant	7,965	0.19	+0.19
Communist Alliance	1. Geoff Lawler; 2. Brenda Kellaway	6,999	0.17	+0.17
Citizens Electoral Council	1. Robert Butler; 2. Ian McCaffrey	5,771	0.14	+0.09
Secular	1. Ian Bryce; 2. Lyle Warren	3,970	0.10	+0.10
Socialist Equality	1. Nick Beams; 2. Gabriela Zabala	3,708	0.09	+0.04
Non-Custodial Parents	1. Andy Thompson; 2. Roland Foster	3,616	0.09	+0.03
Senator On-Line	1. Wes Bas; 2. Brianna Roach	2,974	0.07	+0.02
Reconcile Australia	1. Jennifer Stefanac; 2. Tucky Cooley	2,301	0.06	+0.06
Republican Democrats	1. Michael Eckford; 2. Criselee Stevens	2,029	0.05	+0.05
Protectionist	1. Darrin Hodges; 2. Nick Folkes	1,864	0.04	+0.04
Stable Population	1. William Bourke; 2. Mark O'Connor	1,701	0.04	+0.04
Group B	1. Robert Hodges; 2. Bob Frier	1,521	0.04	+0.04
Group L	1. Leon Belgrave; 2. Janos Beregszaszi	1,475	0.04	+0.04
Group C	1. Tony Robinson; 2. Noel Selby	1,035	0.02	+0.02
Group H	1. Nadia Bloom; 2. Bede Ireland	1,011	0.02	+0.02
Group K	1. Meg Sampson; 2. June Hinchcliffe	947	0.02	+0.02
Group R	1. David Barker; 2. S. G. Zureik	773	0.02	+0.02
Independent	Hamish Richardson	769	0.02	+0.02
Independent	Andrew Whalan	353	0.01	+0.01
Independent	Bryan Pape	242	0.01	+0.01
Independent	Stewart Scott-Irving	73	0.00	+0.00
Independent	Norman Hooper	39	0.00	+0.00
Total formal votes		4,152,524	95.83	−1.93
Informal votes		180,743	4.17	+1.93
Turnout		4,333,267	93.98	−1.42

Elected	#	Senator	Party
2010	1	Concetta Fierravanti-Wells	Liberal
2010	2	John Faulkner	Labor
2010	3	Bill Heffernan	Liberal
2010	4	Matt Thistlethwaite	Labor
2010	5	Fiona Nash	National
2010	6	Lee Rhiannon	Greens
2007
2007	1	Mark Arbib	Labor
2007	2	Helen Coonan	Liberal
2007	3	Doug Cameron	Labor
2007	4	John Williams	National
2007	5	Marise Payne	Liberal
2007	6	Ursula Stephens	Labor

Primary votes saw the Coalition and the Labor Party win two seats each before preferences were counted, with the Greens ahead of the Coalition for the fifth seat. Preferences from the Family First Party, the Christian Democrats and the Shooters and Fishers saw the Coalition reach the quota first, leading to Fiona Nash winning the fifth seat, while Coalition and Sex Party preferences saw the Liberal Democrats threatening the Greens for the sixth and final seat, but Labor preferences saw the Greens reach the quota. The end result was three seats Coalition, two seats Labor, and one seat Green.

=== Elections in the 2000s ===
==== 2007 ====
Elected	#	Senator	Party
2007	1	Mark Arbib	Labor
2007	2	Helen Coonan	Liberal
2007	3	Doug Cameron	Labor
2007	4	John Williams	National
2007	5	Marise Payne	Liberal
2007	6	Ursula Stephens	Labor
2004
2004	1	Bill Heffernan	Liberal
2004	2	Steve Hutchins	Labor
2004	3	Concetta Fierravanti-Wells	Liberal
2004	4	John Faulkner	Labor
2004	5	Fiona Nash	National
2004	6	Michael Forshaw	Labor

2007 Australian federal election: Senate, New South Wales
Party	Candidate	Votes	%	±%
Quota		599,034		
Labor	1. Mark Arbib (elected 1); 2. Doug Cameron (elected 3); 3. Ursula Stephens (elected 6); 4. Pierre Esber; 5. Fiona Seaton; 6. Pauline James	1,764,040	42.07	+5.70
Liberal/National Coalition	1. Helen Coonan (Lib) (elected 2); 2. John Williams (Nat) (elected 4); 3. Marise Payne (Lib) (elected 5); 4. Murray Lees (Nat); 5. Vicky McGahey (Lib); 6. Carolyn Currie (Lib)	1,649,014	39.33	−4.79
Greens	1. Kerry Nettle; 2. David Shoebridge; 3. Marcia Ella-Duncan; 4. Jack Mundey; 5. Christina Ho; 6. Sandra Heilpern	353,286	8.43	+1.09
Christian Democrats	1. Paul Green; 2. Elaine Nile; 3. Allan Lotfizadeh; 4. Peter Pilt; 5. Bruce York	82,560	1.97	−0.64
Democratic Labor	1. Michael O'Donohue; 2. Terence O'Donohue	52,977	1.26	+1.26
Shooters/Fishing and Lifestyle	1. Robert Borsak (Shooters); 2. Robert Shaw (Shooters); 3. Jim Muirhead (Shooters); 4. Andrew Hestelow (F&L); 5. Thomas Morgan (F&L)	45,932	1.10	+1.10
Pauline's UAP	1. Brian Burston; 2. John Carter	39,807	0.95	+0.95
Climate Change	1. Patrice Newell; 2. Karl Kruszelnicki	37,271	0.89	+0.89
Democrats	1. Lyn Shumack; 2. David King; 3. Brett Paterson	37,193	0.89	−1.31
Fishing Party	1. Garth Bridge; 2. Stewart Paterson	27,089	0.65	+0.11
Family First	1. Andrew Markwell; 2. Kathy Gray	25,321	0.60	+0.04
One Nation	1. Judith Newson; 2. Andrew Webber; 3. Peter Bussa; 4. Andy Frew	17,379	0.41	−1.48
What Women Want	1. Justine Caines; 2. Janette Robinson	15,812	0.38	+0.38
Carers Alliance	1. Marylou Carter; 2. Nell Brown; 3. Katrina Clark; 4. Mary Mockler	14,099	0.34	+0.34
Liberty & Democracy	1. Terje Petersen; 2. Janos Beregszaszi	7,772	0.19	+0.19
Climate Conservatives	1. Richard McNeall; 2. James Maxfield	4,203	0.10	+0.10
Socialist Alliance	1. Alex Bainbridge; 2. Susan Price; 3. Kamala Emanuel; 4. Tim Dobson	3,351	0.08	−0.03
Non-Custodial Parents	1. John Geremin; 2. Roland Foster	2,538	0.06	−0.01
Senator On-Line	1. Pat Reilly; 2. Berge Der Sarkissian	2,257	0.05	+0.05
Citizens Electoral Council	1. Ann Lawler; 2. Ian McCaffrey	2,224	0.05	−0.01
Socialist Equality	1. Nick Beams; 2. Carol Divjak	2,139	0.05	+0.05
Hear Our Voice	1. Toni McLennan; 2. Lindsay Carroll	2,041	0.05	+0.05
Secular	1. Ian Bryce; 2. John August	2,017	0.05	+0.05
Group V	1. Walter Tinyow; 2. Maria Chan	1,259	0.03	+0.03
Abolish State Governments	1. Klaas Woldring; 2. Max Bradley	948	0.02	+0.02
Independent	Paula Nadas	394	0.01	+0.01
Independent	Jennifer Stefanac	186	0.00	+0.00
Independent	Curtis Levy	79	0.00	+0.00
Independent	Silvana Nero	46	0.00	+0.00
Total formal votes		4,193,234	97.76	+1.23
Informal votes		96,210	2.24	−1.23
Turnout		4,289,444	95.40	+0.29

Both major parties finished with around 40% of the primary vote each with Labor in front. The Greens received over 8% of the primary vote. Labor won two seats on primary vote alone, narrowly missing a third seat. The Coalition also won two seats, including one to National Party of Australia candidate John Williams. Despite finishing with less than 1% of the primary vote, the Climate Change Coalition managed to place ahead of Pauline's United Australia Party, the Democrats and Family First. The Democrats and Pauline United Australia Party directed preferences to the Climate Change Coalition. Unlike in other states, Family First also directed its preferences to the Climate Change Coalition. After these preferences, the Climate Change Coalition had increased their vote from less than 1% to almost 5%. However, they still narrowly finished behind the Christian Democrats. Preferences from the Climate Change Coalition went to the Greens however they still finished behind the major parties. This led to Greens senator Kerry Nettle losing her seat. Preferences from the Christian Democrats went to the Coalition, allowing them to win their third seat with Labor winning the remaining seat. The end result was three seats each to the Coalition and Labor

==== 2004 ====
Elected	#	Senator	Party
2004	1	Bill Heffernan	Liberal
2004	2	Steve Hutchins	Labor
2004	3	Concertta Fierravanti-Wells	Liberal
2004	4	John Faulkner	Labor
2004	5	Fiona Nash	National
2004	6	Michael Forshaw	Labor
2001
2001	1	Helen Coonan	Liberal
2001	2	Ursula Stephens	Labor
2001	3	Sandy Macdonald	National
2001	4	George Campbell	Labor
2001	5	Marise Payne	Liberal
2001	6	Kerry Nettle	Greens

2004 Australian federal election: Senate, New South Wales
Party	Candidate	Votes	%	±%
Quota		567,796		
Liberal/National Coalition	1. Bill Heffernan (Lib) (elected 1); 2. Concetta Fierravanti-Wells (Lib) (elected 3); 3. Fiona Nash (Nat) (elected 5); 4. John Tierney (Lib); 5. Michael Darby (Lib); 6. Robyn Bain (Nat)	1,753,507	44.12	+2.36
Labor	1. Steve Hutchins (elected 2); 2. John Faulkner (elected 4); 3. Michael Forshaw (elected 6); 4. Joanna Woods	1,445,602	36.37	+2.87
Greens	1. John Kaye; 2. Carol Berry; 3. Ben Oquist; 4. Susie Russell; 5. Trish Mullins; 6. Jeremy Buckingham	291,845	7.34	+2.98
Christian Democrats	1. Fred Nile; 2. Patricia Giles; 3. Peter Walker; 4. Kevin Hume; 5. George Capsis	103,831	2.61	+0.74
Democrats	1. Aden Ridgeway; 2. Nina Burridge; 3. Greg Butler	87,377	2.20	−4.01
One Nation	1. Judith Newson; 2. Lynn Stanfield; 3. Peter Bussa	75,284	1.89	−3.69
HEMP	1. Michael Balderstone; 2. Graham Askey	24,016	0.60	−0.32
Family First	1. Joan Woods; 2. Ivan Herald	22,210	0.56	+0.56
Fishing Party	1. Bob Smith; 2. David Hitchcock	21,322	0.54	−0.17
Liberals for Forests	1. Glenn Druery; 2. Ruth Green	21,197	0.53	+0.53
Lower Excise Fuel	1. Dave O'Loughlin; 2. Derek Ridgley	19,156	0.48	−0.13
Outdoor Recreation	1. Leon Belgrave; 2. Janos Beregszaszi	13,822	0.35	+0.35
Group A	1. David Ettridge; 2. Ashley Ettridge	13,635	0.34	+0.34
Progressive Labour	1. Klaas Woldring; 2. Kate Ferguson	13,175	0.33	−1.44
Veterans	1. Bruce Howlett; 2. Bonnie Fraser; 3. Trevor Hesse	12,905	0.32	+0.32
AAFI	1. David Kitson; 2. Edwin Woodger	11,508	0.29	−0.25
No GST	1. Mick Gallagher; 2. Warwick Mead	9,713	0.24	−0.42
New Country	1. Greg Graham; 2. Lisa de Meur	6,218	0.16	+0.16
Great Australians	1. Brett McHolme; 2. Dennis Robinson	4,691	0.12	+0.12
Socialist Alliance	1. Kylie Moon; 2. Ray Jackson	4,241	0.11	+0.11
Save the ADI Site	1. Geoff Brown; 2. Bernie Laughlan	3,281	0.08	+0.08
Non-Custodial Parents	1. Grahame Marks; 2. Andrew Thompson	2,930	0.07	−0.03
Group K	1. Martin Zitek; 2. Robert Zitek	2,750	0.07	+0.07
Citizens Electoral Council	1. Robert Butler; 2. Richard Witten	2,471	0.06	+0.00
Progressive Alliance	1. Reese Malcolm; 2. Lee Raper	2,342	0.06	+0.06
Nuclear Disarmament	1. Michael Denborough; 2. Yvonne Francis	2,163	0.05	−0.07
Group D	1. James Harker-Mortlock; 2. Kelly Ferguson	1,637	0.04	+0.04
Independent	John Thompson	549	0.01	+0.01
Group W	1. Tom Vogelgesang; 2. Don Nguyen	538	0.01	+0.01
Independent	Paul Simpson	251	0.01	+0.01
Independent	Carole Carpenter	208	0.01	+0.01
Group U	1. Nick Beams; 2. Terry Cook	116	0.00	+0.00
Independent	Jack Lord	74	0.00	+0.01
Total formal votes		3,974,565	96.53	+0.07
Informal votes		143,021	3.47	−0.07
Turnout		4,117,586	95.11	−0.38

The primary vote saw the Coalition winning three seats and Labor winning two, leaving the Greens and Labor leading the Christian Democrats for the final seat. Preferences from liberals for forests, Family First, the Democrats and One Nation meant that the Christian Democrats ended up overtaking both Labor and the Greens for the final vacancy, but Labor managed to stay ahead of the Greens, meaning that Labor ending up taking the final seat using Green preferences. The result was three seats coalition and three seats Labor.

==== 2001 ====
Elected	#	Senator	Party
2001	1	Helen Coonan	Liberal
2001	2	Ursula Stephens	Labor
2001	3	Sandy Macdonald	National
2001	4	George Campbell	Labor
2001	5	Marise Payne	Liberal
2001	6	Kerry Nettle	Greens
1998
1998	1	Steve Hutchins	Labor
1998	2	Bill Heffernan	Liberal
1998	3	John Faulkner	Labor
1998	4	John Tierney	Liberal
1998	5	Aden Ridgeway	Democrats
1998	6	Michael Forshaw	Labor

2001 Australian federal election: Senate, New South Wales
Party	Candidate	Votes	%	±%
Quota		554,207		
Coalition	1. Helen Coonan (Lib) (elected 1); 2. Sandy Macdonald (Nat) (elected 3); 3. Marise Payne (Lib) (elected 5); 4. Fiona Nash (Nat); 5. Scot MacDonald (Lib); 6. Terence Tang (Lib)	1,620,235	41.76	+3.3
Labor	1. Ursula Stephens (elected 2); 2. George Campbell (elected 4); 3. Warren Mundine; 4. Joanna Woods	1,299,488	33.50	−5.0
Democrats	1. Vicki Bourne; 2. Joanne Yates; 3. Craig Chung; 4. Caroline Mayfield; 5. Janine Prince; 6. Julian Evans	240,867	6.21	−1.1
One Nation	1. Don McKinnon; 2. Rick Putra; 3. Carol Deeney	216,522	5.58	−4.0
Greens	1. Kerry Nettle (elected 6); 2. John Kaye; 3. Jan Davis; 4. James Ryan	169,139	4.36	+2.3
Christian Democrats	1. George Capsis; 2. Kevin Hume	72,697	1.87	+0.4
Progressive Labour	1. Klaas Woldring; 2. Shona Lee	68,483	1.77	+1.8
HEMP	1. Michael Balderstone; 2. Don Fuggle	35,526	0.92	+0.9
Fishing Party	1. Robert Smith; 2. David Wiseman	27,591	0.71	+0.7
No GST	1. Mick Gallagher; 2. Charles Martin	25,734	0.66	+0.5
Lower Excise Fuel	1. David O'Loughlin; 2. Paul Freeman	23,767	0.61	+0.6
AAFI	1. David Kitson; 2. Edwin Woodger	21,012	0.54	+0.3
Unity	1. Thang Ngo; 2. Robert McLeod	19,731	0.51	−1.1
Legal System Reform	1. Denise Greenaway; 2. Valerie Armstrong	8,199	0.21	+0.2
Our Common Future	1. Helen Caldicott; 2. Ted Potts	5,358	0.14	+0.1
Republican	1. Kerry McNally; 2. Tom Jordan	5,101	0.13	+0.1
Nuclear Disarmament	1. Michael Denborough; 2. Yvonne Francis	4,596	0.12	−0.1
Non-Custodial Parents	1. Andy Thompson; 2. Annette McKeegan	4,071	0.10	+0.1
Group L	1. Lex Stewart; 2. John Stewart	2,402	0.06	+0.06
Citizens Electoral Council	1. Robert Butler; 2. Clenys Collins	2,370	0.06	+0.0
Advance Australia	1. Rex Connor; 2. Robert Astridge; 3. Shirley Guy	1,936	0.05	+0.05
Group U	1. Pip Hinman; 2. Ian Rintoul	1,364	0.04	+0.04
Group N	1. Warren Smith; 2. Geoff Lawler; 3. Dora Anthony	1,241	0.03	+0.03
Independent	Beverly Baker	971	0.03	+0.03
Independent	F Ivor	703	0.02	+0.02
Independent	Jack Lord	237	0.01	+0.01
Independent	Walter Tinyow	102	0.01	+0.01
Total formal votes		3,879,443	96.46	−0.23
Informal votes		142,281	3.54	+0.23
Turnout		4,021,724	95.66	−0.68

=== Elections in the 1990s ===
==== 1998 ====
Elected	#	Senator	Party
1998
1998	1	Steve Hutchins	Labor
1998	2	Bill Heffernan	Liberal
1998	3	John Faulkner	Labor
1998	4	John Tierney	Liberal
1998	5	Aden Ridgeway	Democrats
1998	6	Michael Forshaw	Labor
1996
1996	1	Marise Payne	Liberal
1996	2	Suzanne West	Labor
1996	3	David Brownhill	National
1996	4	George Campbell	Labor
1996	5	Helen Coonan	Liberal
1996	6	Vicki Bourne	Democrats

1998 Australian federal election: Senate, New South Wales
Party	Candidate	Votes	%	±%
Quota		536,533		
Labor	1. Steve Hutchins (elected 1); 2. John Faulkner (elected 3); 3. Michael Forshaw (elected 6); 4. Ursula Stephens	1,452,560	38.7	+1.5
Coalition	1. Bill Heffernan (Lib) (elected 2); 2. John Tierney (Lib) (elected 4); 3. Sandy Macdonald (Nat); 4. Concetta Fierravanti-Wells (Lib)	1,375,563	36.6	−4.8
One Nation	1. David Oldfield; 2. Brian Burston; 3. Bevan O'Regan	361,009	9.6	+9.6
Democrats	1. Aden Ridgeway (elected 5); 2. Matthew Baird; 3. Suzzanne Reddy; 4. David Mendelssohn	275,910	7.4	−2.1
Greens	1. John Sutton; 2. Catherine Moore; 3. Lee Rhiannon; 4. Suzie Russell	81,612	2.2	−0.1
Unity	1. Jason Yat-Sen Li; 2. Sonja Stockreiter; 3. Sam McGuid; 4. Kieran Ginges; 5. Nicholas Hassapis	61,607	1.6	+1.6
Christian Democrats	1. Graham McLennan; 2. Janne Petersen; 3. Tom Allanson; 4. Rex Morgan; 5. Michael McLennan	58,079	1.5	−0.5
Australia First	1. Victor Shen; 2. Greg Willson	29,660	0.8	+0.8
Democratic Socialist	1. Marina Carman; 2. Peter Boyle	8,221	0.2	+0.2
Reclaim Australia	1. Rodney Smith; 2. Edwin Woodger	8,019	0.2	−1.0
Nuclear Disarmament	1. Michael Denborough; 2. Yvonne Francis	6,489	0.2	+0.2
Abolish Child Support	1. Justice Abolish; 2. Richard Mezinec	5,810	0.2	+0.2
Group G	1. Malcolm Lees; 2. Warwick Rankin	5,745	0.2	+0.2
No Aircraft Noise	1. Chris Nash; 2. Jane Waddell	5,035	0.1	−0.4
Natural Law	1. Richard Nolan; 2. Bev Seymour	4,602	0.1	0.0
Citizens Electoral Council	1. Robert Butler; 2. Glenys Collins; 3. Lindsay Cosgrove	4,403	0.1	+0.1
Group J	1. David Mouldfield; 2. Paul-Ian Handsome	2,786	0.1	+0.1
Independent	Pauline Pantsdown	2,295	0.1	+0.1
Socialist Equality	1. Nick Beams; 2. Carol Divjak	1,808	0.1	+0.1
Group D	1. Mick Gallagher; 2. John Mawson	1,690	0.1	+0.1
Group S	1. Graeme Melville; 2. Philip Broadbridge	808	0.0	0.0
Group P	1. Patricia Poulos; 2. John Holley	708	0.0	0.0
Group R	1. Robert Schollbach; 2. Amanda Stirling	415	0.0	0.0
Independent	Mehmet Yaglipinar	256	0.0	0.0
Independent	Paul Sarks	165	0.0	0.0
Independent	Richard Ross	133	0.0	0.0
Independent	Ron Poulsen	117	0.0	0.0
Independent	Adrian Vaughan	72	0.0	0.0
Independent	Party Parslow	59	0.0	0.0
Independent	Stani Joseph	54	0.0	0.0
Independent	Tom Kumar	35	0.0	0.0
Total formal votes		3,755,725	96.7	+0.5
Informal votes		128,608	3.3	−0.5
Turnout		3,884,333	96.3	−0.4

==== 1996 ====
Elected	#	Senator	Party
1996
1996	1	Bob Woods	Liberal
1996	2	Sue West	Labor
1996	3	David Brownhill	National
1996	4	Bruce Childs	Labor
1996	5	Helen Coonan	Liberal
1996	6	Vicki Bourne	Democrats
1993
1993	1	Michael Forshaw	Labor
1993	2	Michael Baume	Liberal
1993	3	John Faulkner	Labor
1993	4	John Tierney	Liberal
1993	5	Belinda Neal	Labor
1993	6	Sandy Macdonald	National

1996 Australian federal election: Senate: New South Wales
Party	Candidate	Votes	%	±%
Quota		526,041		
Coalition	1. Bob Woods (Lib) (elected 1); 2. David Brownhill (Nat) (elected 3); 3. Helen Coonan (Lib) (elected 5); 4. Abraham Constantin (Lib)	1,522,722	41.3	+2.4
Labor	1. Sue West (elected 2); 2. Bruce Childs (elected 4); 3. Tom Wheelwright; 4. Rima Barghout	1,370,918	37.2	−9.2
Democrats	1. Vicki Bourne (elected 6); 2. Arthur Chesterfield-Evans; 3. Andrew Larcos; 4. Troy Anderson	351,491	9.5	+4.6
Greens	1. Karla Sperling; 2. Peter Denton; 3. Jane Elix; 4. Murray Matson	85,004	2.3	+0.2
Shooters	1. Richard Sims; 2. Robyn Bourke; 3. Daniel Redfern; 4. Rodney Franich	74,032	2.0	+0.2
Call to Australia	1. Alasdair Webster; 2. Elaine Webster; 3. Graeme McLennan; 4. Bill Bird; 5. Bruce Coleman	72,969	2.0	+0.5
AAFI	1. John Phillips; 2. Bevan O'Regan	61,811	1.7	+1.0
Reclaim Australia	1. David Kitson; 2. Carolyn O'Callaghan	44,545	1.2	+1.2
ABFFOC	1. Teresa Findlay-Barnes; 2. David Tribe	18,960	0.5	+0.5
Women's Party	1. Darelle Duncan; 2. Sarah Thew	17,417	0.5	+0.5
No Aircraft Noise	1. Chris Nash; 2. Sylvia Hale	17,043	0.5	+0.5
The Seniors	1. Beryl Evans; 2. Lorraine Welsh	8,268	0.2	+0.2
Grey Power	1. John Verheyen; 2. Theo Hetterscheid; 3. Bob Segerstrom; 4. Olga Pickering	5,173	0.1	+0.1
Independent	Jade Hurley	4,765	0.1	+0.1
Natural Law	1. Catherine Knoles; 2. Ines Judd	3,702	0.1	−0.2
Group I	1. Robert Schollbach; 2. Amanda Stirling	3,632	0.1	+0.1
Republican	1. Peter Breen; 2. Kerry McNally; 3. Valerie Housego; 4. Assefa Bekele; 5. Antoinette Fahey	2,846	0.1	+0.1
Group K	1. Tony Galati; 2. Sam Galati	1,128	0.0	0.0
Group M	1. Robert Butler; 2. Lindsay Cosgrove	657	0.0	0.0
Independent	Morris Jones	485	0.0	0.0
Independent	Dian Underwood	433	0.0	0.0
Independent	Bill Bradley	383	0.0	0.0
Independent	Gretel Pinniger	382	0.0	0.0
Independent	Ray Patterson	295	0.0	0.0
Independent	Ivor F	210	0.0	0.0
Independent	John Barbara	57	0.0	0.0
Independent	David Piggin	31	0.0	0.0
Total formal votes		3,682,283	96.2	−1.1
Informal votes		143,388	3.8	+1.1
Turnout		3,825,671	96.7	+0.2

==== 1993 ====
Elected	#	Senator	Party
1993	1	Graham Richardson	Labor
1993	2	Michael Baume	Liberal
1993	3	John Faulkner	Labor
1993	4	John Tierney	Liberal
1993	5	Kerry Sibraa	Labor
1993	6	Sandy Macdonald	National
1990	1	Stephen Loosley	Labor
1990	2	Bronwyn Bishop	Liberal
1990	3	Bruce Childs	Labor
1990	4	David Brownhill	National
1990	5	Vicki Bourne	Democrats
1990	6	Suzanne West	Labor

1993 Australian federal election: Senate: New South Wales
Party	Candidate	Votes	%	±%
Quota		512,012		
Labor	1. Graham Richardson (elected 1); 2. John Faulkner (elected 3); 3. Kerry Sibraa (elected 5); 4. Mary-Anne Armstrong	1,681,528	46.9	+6.2
Coalition	1. Michael Baume (Lib) (elected 2); 2. John Tierney (Lib) (elected 4); 3. Sandy Macdonald (Nat) (elected 6); 4. Marise Payne (Lib)	1,394,111	38.9	+0.6
Democrats	1. Karin Sowada; 2. Ray Griffiths; 3. Arthur Chesterfield-Evans	176,324	4.9	−6.9
Greens	1. Steve Brigham; 2. Joy Wallace; 3. Ian Cohen; 4. Cecily Stead	74,620	2.1	+2.0
Shooters	1. Michael Ascher; 2. Ted Orr; 3. Jeff Wilkie; 4. Suzanne O'Connell; 5. Robyn Bourke	63,691	1.8	+1.8
Call to Australia	1. Bruce Coleman; 2. Graham McLennan; 3. Shirley Grigg; 4. Glen Ryan	53,445	1.5	−0.6
Green Alliance	1. Jane Beckmann; 2. Bernie Brian	46,971	1.3	−0.6
AAFI	1. David Kitson; 2. Ian Watherlake	23,941	0.7	+0.7
Group E	1. Leonard Teale; 2. Colin Ward	14,883	0.4	+0.4
Grey Power	1. Frances Roylance; 2. Gay Grounds	10,428	0.3	−0.2
Natural Law	1. Doreen Kerr; 2. Mike Smith; 3. Ines Judd	10,404	0.3	+0.3
Confederate Action	1. John Uebergang; 2. Doug Hawkins	6,725	0.2	+0.2
Independent	Milorad Gajin	5,208	0.1	+0.1
Republican	1. Peter Consadine; 2. Gennie Klein	4,717	0.1	+0.1
Citizens Electoral Council	1. Leone Hay; 2. Robert Butler; 3. Gloria Wood	3,813	0.1	−0.1
Group J	1. O Santa Claus; 2. Lord Rolo	3,648	0.1	+0.1
Group H	1. Patricia Poulos; 2. Peter Archer; 3. John Holley	2,127	0.1	+0.1
Group S	1. Walter Bass; 2. Paul Hales	2,054	0.1	+0.1
Group M	1. David Stevens; 2. Yvonne Harrison	1,384	0.1	+0.1
Group U	1. Robert Schollbach; 2. Karen Stirling	1,133	0.0	0.0
Group Q	1. Rosemary Lavery; 2. Robert John; 3. Priscilla Lavery	670	0.0	0.0
Independent	Michael Anderson	533	0.0	0.0
Independent	Dianne Decker	528	0.0	0.0
Group T	1. Michael Vescio; 2. Pamela Wheatley	386	0.0	0.0
Independent	Argy Beletich	317	0.0	0.0
Independent	Malcolm Milton	168	0.0	0.0
Independent	Katherine De Bry	150	0.0	0.0
Independent	Ron Poulsen	86	0.0	0.0
Independent	Bryan Ellis	86	0.0	0.0
Total formal votes		3,584,079	97.3	+1.6
Informal votes		97,534	2.7	−1.6
Turnout		3,681,613	96.5	+0.6

==== 1990 ====
Elected	#	Senator	Party
1990
1990	1	Stephen Loosley	Labor
1990	2	Bronwyn Bishop	Liberal
1990	3	Bruce Childs	Labor
1990	4	David Brownhill	National
1990	5	Vicki Bourne	Democrats
1990	6	Suzanne West	Labor
1987
1987	1	Kerry Sibraa	Labor
1987	2	Michael Baume	Liberal
1987	3	John Faulkner	Labor
1987	4	Peter Baume	Liberal
1987	5	Graham Richardson	Labor
1987	6	Paul McLean	Democrats

1990 Australian federal election: Senate, New South Wales
Party	Candidate	Votes	%	±%
Quota		476,878		
Labor	1. Stephen Loosley (elected 1); 2. Bruce Childs (elected 3); 3. Sue West (elected 6); 4. John McCarthy	1,356,430	40.6	−1.8
Coalition	1. Bronwyn Bishop (Lib) (elected 2); 2. David Brownhill (Nat) (elected 4); 3. Chris Puplick (Lib); 4. Geoffrey Anderson (Lib)	1,280,382	38.4	−2.0
Democrats	1. Vicki Bourne (elected 5); 2. Karin Sowada; 3. William Cole; 4. Dorothy Thompson	393,521	11.8	+2.7
Call to Australia	1. Kevin Hume; 2. John Everingham	69,744	2.1	−1.3
Green Alliance	1. Ian Cohen; 2. Christopher Kirkbright; 3. Sue Arnold; 4. Jo Faith; 5. Jane Beckmann	64,583	2.0	+2.0
Independent EFF	1. George Turner; 2. Alan Gourley; 3. Bill Garing; 4. Jim Shanks; 5. Dallas Clarnette; 6. June Smith	63,378	1.9	+1.9
Nuclear Disarmament	1. Robert Wood; 2. Samantha Trenoweth	34,765	1.0	−0.5
Environment Inds	1. Irina Dunn; 2. Peter Prineas; 3. Harry Recher	27,046	0.8	+0.8
Grey Power	1. Robert Clark; 2. Theo Hetterscheid; 3. Walter Radimey	18,068	0.5	+0.5
New Australia	1. Oscar Landicho; 2. Onsy Mattar; 3. Len Hajjar; 4. Sam Ressitis; 5. Reginaldo Conti; 6. Warren Rogan	8,332	0.2	+0.2
Citizens Electoral Council	1. Lex Stewart; 2. Leone Hay; 3. John Doran	7,129	0.2	+0.2
Greens	1. Daniela Reverberi; 2. Jenys Newton	4,826	0.1	−0.9
Group L	1. Colin Wilson; 2. Glenn Wilson	3,846	0.1	+0.1
Group C	1. Ian Murphy; 2. Anne Murphy	2,201	0.1	+0.1
Group D	1. Alan Wilkinson	1,583	0.1	+0.1
Independent	Zero-Population Growth	924	0.0	0.0
Independent	Lord Rolo	352	0.0	0.0
Independent	Abraham Lincoln	208	0.0	0.0
Independent	Ian Monk	203	0.0	0.0
Independent	Bill Smith	150	0.0	0.0
Independent	Bob Sutherland	131	0.0	0.0
Independent	John Henshaw	124	0.0	0.0
Independent	Peter Consadine	71	0.0	0.0
Independent	Evalds Erglis	63	0.0	0.0
Independent	Harry Hnoudakis	37	0.0	0.0
Independent	Reen Dixon	28	0.0	0.0
Independent	Gene Pierson	17	0.0	0.0
Total formal votes		3,338,142	95.8	+0.7
Informal votes		145,429	4.2	−0.7
Turnout		3,483,571	95.9	+1.4

=== Elections in the 1980s ===
==== 1987 ====
1987 Australian federal election: Senate, New South Wales
Party	Candidate	Votes	%	±%
Quota		245,883		
Labor	1. Kerry Sibraa (elected 1); 2. Arthur Gietzelt (elected 4); 3. Graham Richardson (elected 6); 4. Bruce Childs (elected 8); 5. John Morris (elected 10); 6. Sue West; 7. Michael Sexton	1,355,792	42.4	+0.8
Liberal–National joint ticket	1. Michael Baume (Lib) (elected 2); 2. Peter Baume (Lib) (elected 5); 3. David Brownhill (Nat) (elected 7); 4. Chris Puplick (Lib) (elected 9); 5. Bronwyn Bishop (Lib) (elected 11); 6. Ralph Schulze (Nat); 7. June McPhie (Lib)	1,289,888	40.4	+3.4
Democrats	1. Paul McLean (elected 3); 2. Jenny Macleod; 3. Richard Jones; 4. Gary Chestnut	290,049	9.1	−0.6
Call to Australia	1. Elaine Nile; 2. Kevin Hume	107,859	3.4	−0.2
Nuclear Disarmament	1. Robert Wood (elected 12); 2. Irina Dunn	48,998	1.5	−8.2
Greens	1. Ian Cohen; 2. Daphne Gollan	32,513	1.0	+1.0
Group A	1. Ruth Phillips; 2. Walter Brun	30,504	0.9	+0.9
Defence and Ex-Services	1. Leslie Edwards; 2. David Herd; 3. William Tuohy; 4. Rowley McMahon	14,431	0.4	+0.4
Unite Australia	1. Alan Smith; 2. Edna Fabb	5,458	0.2	+0.2
Group I	1. Peter Consandine; 2. Brian Buckley	4,519	0.1	+0.1
Group F	1. Leon Bringolf; 2. Habib Fares; 3. Jim Donovan	4,238	0.1	+0.1
Group M	1. John Higginbotham; 2. Ian Murphy	3,795	0.1	+0.1
Group B	1. Patricia Poulos; 2. John Holley; 3. John Beasley	3,749	0.1	+0.1
Independent	Arthur Chesterfield-Evans	1,706	0.1	+0.1
Independent	Bob Spanswick	968	0.0	0.0
Independent	Ivor F	765	0.0	0.0
Independent	Phil Murray	564	0.0	0.0
Independent	Nick Jones	270	0.0	0.0
Independent	Jame Smith-New	234	0.0	0.0
Independent	Keith Larkings	88	0.0	0.0
Independent	James Goody	86	0.0	0.0
Total formal votes		3,196,474	95.1	+0.7
Informal votes		164,001	4.9	−0.7
Turnout		3,360,475	94.5	+0.1

#	Senator	Party
1	Kerry Sibraa	Labor
2	Michael Baume	Liberal
3	Paul McLean	Democrat
4	Arthur Gietzelt	Labor
5	Peter Baume	Liberal
6	Graham Richardson	Labor
7	David Brownhill	National
8	Bruce Childs	Labor
9	Chris Puplick	Liberal
10	John Morris	Labor
11	Bronwyn Bishop	Liberal
12	Robert Wood	NDP

==== 1984 ====
Elected	#	Senator	Party
1985
1985	1	Kerry Sibraa	Labor
1985	2	Chris Puplick	Liberal
1985	3	Bruce Childs	Labor
1985	4	David Brownhill	National
1985	5	John Morris	Labor
1985	6	Michael Baume	Liberal
1985	7	Colin Mason	Democrats
1982
1982	1	Arthur Gietzelt	Labor
1982	2	John Carrick	Liberal
1982	3	Graham Richardson	Labor
1982	4	Peter Baume	Liberal
1982	5	Doug McClelland	Labor

1984 Australian federal election: Senate, New South Wales
Party	Candidate	Votes	%	±%
Quota		381,462		
Labor	1. Kerry Sibraa (elected 1); 2. Bruce Childs (elected 3); 3. John Morris (elected 5); 4. Sue West	1,268,489	41.6	−5.7
Coalition	1. Chris Puplick (Lib) (elected 2); 2. David Brownhill (Nat) (elected 4); 3. Michael Baume (Lib) (elected 6); 4. Bronwyn Bishop (Lib); 5. Doug Moppett (Nat)	1,130,601	37.0	−1.1
Nuclear Disarmament	1. Peter Garrett; 2. Gillian Fisher; 3. Marie-Anne Hockings; 4. Russel Ward	294,772	9.7	+9.7
Democrats	1. Colin Mason (elected 7); 2. Paul McLean; 3. Jenny MacLeod; 4. Garry Chestnut	223,095	7.3	−1.3
Call to Australia	1. Graham McLennan; 2. Tom Toogood; 3. Patricia Judge; 4. Kevin Hume; 5. John Everingham; 6. Clair Isbister; 7. Elaine Nile	109,046	3.6	+0.2
Group F	1. Bill Wentworth; 2. Robert Clark; 3. Raymond King; 4. Myfanwy Young	17,530	0.6	+0.6
Group H	1. Burnum Burnum; 2. Rocky Thomas	4,331	0.1	+0.1
Independent	Helen Hibbard	1,671	0.1	+0.1
Group D	1. Henry Soper; 2. Maureen Nathan; 3. Peter Wright; 4. Archibald Brown; 5. William More; 6. John Veenstra	966	0.0	0.0
Independent	Helen Richards	634	0.0	0.0
Group G	1. Peter Consandine; 2. Brian Buckley	557	0.0	0.0
Total formal votes		3,051,692	94.4	+5.5
Informal votes		181,272	5.6	−5.5
Turnout		3,232,964	94.4	−0.5

==== 1983 ====
1983 Australian federal election: Senate, New South Wales
Party	Candidate	Votes	%	±%
Quota		249,207		
Labor	1. Doug McClelland (elected 1); 2. Arthur Gietzelt (elected 3); 3. Graham Richardson (elected 5); 4. Kerry Sibraa (elected 7); 5. Bruce Childs (elected 9); 6. Sue West	1,298,672	47.4	+2.6
Coalition	1. John Carrick (Lib) (elected 2); 2. Peter Baume (Lib) (elected 4); 3. Douglas Scott (Nat) (elected 6); 4. Misha Lajovic (Lib) (elected 8); 5. Chris Puplick (Lib); 6. Doug Moppett (Nat)	1,045,502	38.1	–3.9
Democrats	1. Colin Mason (elected 10); 2. Paul McLean; 3. Christine Townend; 4. Megan Sampson; 5. Peter Hains; 6. Rodney Irvine	235,712	8.6	+1.7
Call to Australia	1. Clair Isbister; 2. John Whitehall; 3. Graham McLennan; 4. Kevin Hume; 5. Thomas Toogood; 6. Elaine Nile	96,065	3.5	–0.9
Group A	1. Ronald Weatherall; 2. Keith Gleeson	32,385	1.2	+1.2
Independent	Burnum Burnum	10,524	0.4	+0.4
Socialist	1. Peter Symon; 2. Harry Black; 3. Stratos Mavrantonis	3,656	0.1	+0.1
Independent	John Comyns	2,596	0.1	+0.1
Peace on Earth	1. Dudley Leggett; 2. Michelle Sheather	2,502	0.1	+0.1
Engineered Australia	1. James Firbank; 2. Valerianne Hill; 3. William Lewis	2,434	0.1	+0.1
Progress	1. Marjorie Wisby; 2. Archibald Brown; 3. William More	1,905	0.1	+0.1
Socialist Workers	1. Amanda Orr; 2. Andres Garin	1,694	0.1	+0.1
Integrity Team	1. Kenneth Aylward; 2. Antony Maurice; 3. Geoffrey Holt	1,492	0.1	+0.1
Social Democrats	1. Walter Roach; 2. Edward de Bouter; 3. Johann Liszikam	1,089	0.0	0.0
Independent	Stephen Starkey	1,074	0.0	0.0
White Australia	1. Robert Cameron; 2. Russell Scrivener	1,025	0.0	0.0
The New Party	1. Vincent Murphy; 2. Stephen Tsousis	956	0.0	0.0
Republican	1. Peter Consandine; 2. David Maroney	582	0.0	0.0
New Australian	1. Rudolph Dezelin; 2. Milan Riznic	391	0.0	0.0
Australian Family Movement	1. Jon Axtens; 2. Joseph Fusco	326	0.0	0.0
Independent	Ross Baldwin	277	0.0	0.0
Independent	Glen Davis	188	0.0	0.0
Independent	Raymond Butcher	134	0.0	0.0
Independent	Kaine Aalto	87	0.0	0.0
Total formal votes		2,741,268	88.9	−1.7
Informal votes		341,787	11.1	+1.7
Turnout		3,083,055	94.9	+0.7

#	Senator	Party
1	Doug McClelland	Labor
2	John Carrick	Liberal
3	Arthur Gietzelt	Labor
4	Peter Baume	Liberal
5	Graham Richardson	Labor
6	Douglas Scott	National
7	Kerry Sibraa	Labor
8	Misha Lajovic	Liberal
9	Bruce Childs	Labor
10	Colin Mason	Democrat

==== 1980 ====
Elected	#	Senator	Party
1981
1981	1	Doug McClelland	Labor
1981	2	John Carrick	Liberal
1981	3	Bruce Childs	Labor
1981	4	Douglas Scott	NCP
1981	5	Kerry Sibraa	Labor
1978
1978	1	Peter Baume	Liberal
1978	2	Tony Mulvihill	Labor
1978	3	Misha Lajovic	Liberal
1978	4	Arthur Gietzelt	Labor
1978	5	Colin Mason	Democrat

1980 Australian federal election: Senate, New South Wales
Party	Candidate	Votes	%	±%
Quota		452,977		
Labor	1. Doug McClelland (elected 1); 2. Bruce Childs (elected 3); 3. Kerry Sibraa (elected 5)	1,215,796	44.7	+4.6
Coalition	1. John Carrick (Lib) (elected 2); 2. Douglas Scott (NCP) (elected 4); 3. Chris Puplick (Lib)	1,139,825	41.9	−1.4
Democrats	1. Paul McLean; 2. Elisabeth Kirkby; 3. Laurence Bourke	187,507	6.9	−1.4
Call to Australia	1. Fred Nile; 2. John Whitehall; 3. Joan Loew	118,535	4.4	+2.5
Marijuana	1. James Billington; 2. Anne Parsons	13,476	0.5	−0.4
National Colonialist Party	1. Nicholas Jones; 2. Ian MacRae	11,038	0.4	+0.4
Socialist	1. Peter Symon; 2. Harry Black; 3. Raymond Ferguson; 4. Edgar Woodbury	8,760	0.3	+0.1
Group C	1. John E Champion; 2. Julie A Champion; 3. John D Champion	6,785	0.3	+0.3
Independent	Estelle Myers	4,469	0.2	+0.2
Independent	Joylene Hairmouth	4,334	0.2	+0.2
Independent	Josephine Chisholm-Mallett	2,855	0.1	+0.1
Progress	1. Fernand Eyschen; 2. Nicholas Hudson	2,260	0.1	−2.4
Independent	Terence Griffiths	921	0.0	0.0
Independent	Berard O'Grady	489	0.0	0.0
Independent	Rudolph Dezelin	305	0.0	0.0
Independent	Norman Eather	262	0.0	0.0
Independent	Gene Salvestrin	241	0.0	0.0
Total formal votes		2,717,858	90.6	+0.2
Informal votes		281,338	9.4	−0.2
Turnout		2,999,186	94.2	−0.8

=== Elections in the 1960s ===
==== 1966 ====
1966 Australian federal election: Senate special, New South Wales
Party	Candidate	Votes	%	±%
Quota		1,046,934		
Liberal	Bob Cotton (re-elected 1)	1,056,968	50.48	
Labor	Clive Evatt	908,763	43.40	
Democratic Labor	Gwynydd Meredith	128,136	6.12	
Total formal votes		2,093,867	95.75	
Informal votes		92,949	4.25	
Turnout		2,186,816	94.72	

=== Elections in the 1910s ===
==== 1914 ====
Each elector voted for up to six candidates. Percentages refer to the number of voters rather than the number of votes.

1914 Australian federal election: Senate, New South Wales
Party	Candidate	Votes	%	±%
Labor	Albert Gardiner (elected 1)	344,151	51.6	+1.0 (Note: Change compared to the personal vote at the 1910 election.)
Labor	Allan McDougall (elected 2)	342,482	51.3	+0.3
Labor	John Grant (elected 3)	341,934	51.2	+6.0 (Note: Change compared to the personal vote at the 1913 election.)
Liberal	Sir Albert Gould (re-elected 4)	341,569	51.1	−2.5
Liberal	Edward Millen (re-elected 5)	339,476	50.9	−1.6
Labor	David Watson (elected 6)	338,280	50.7	+5.7
Liberal	Charles Oakes (defeated)	333,763	50.0	−2.3
Labor	Arthur Rae (defeated)	333,243	49.9	+0.9
Labor	Ike Smith	324,630	48.6	+6.1
Liberal	Frank Coen	324,152	48.6	
Liberal	Herbert Pratten	322,076	48.3	
Liberal	Arthur Trethowan	318,788	47.8	
Total formal votes		4,004,514; 667,419 voters	95.02	+1.74
Informal votes		34,948	4.98	−1.74
Turnout		702,403	64.85	−4.34
Party total votes
Labor		2,024,690	50.56	+6.34
Liberal		1,979,824	49.44	−3.32

==== 1913 ====
Each elector voted for up to three candidates. Percentages refer to the number of voters rather than the number of votes.

1913 Australian federal election: Senate, New South Wales
Party	Candidate	Votes	%	±%
Liberal	Sir Albert Gould (re-elected 1)	358,143	53.6	−2.3 (Note: Change compared to the personal vote at the 1906 election.)
Liberal	Edward Millen (re-elected 2)	350,887	52.5	−1.7
Liberal	Charles Oakes (elected 3)	349,544	52.3	
Labour	John Grant	301,994	45.2	
Labour	David Watson	300,826	45.0	
Labour	Ike Smith	284,322	42.5	
Socialist Labor	James Moroney	22,969	3.4	−1.1
Socialist Labor	Thomas Batho	21,817	3.3	
Socialist Labor	Henry Ostler	15,763	2.4	
Total formal votes		2,006,265; 668,755 voters	93.2	−2.0
Informal votes		48,195	6.7	+2.0
Turnout		716,950	69.2	+7.8
Party total votes
Liberal		1,058,574	52.8	+8.4
Labour		887,142	44.2	−6.3
Socialist Labor		60,549	3.0	+1.4

==== 1910 ====
Each elector voted for up to three candidates. Percentages refer to the number of voters rather than the number of votes.

1910 Australian federal election: Senate, New South Wales
Party	Candidate	Votes	%	±%
Labour	Allan McDougall (elected 1)	249,212	51.0	
Labour	Albert Gardiner (elected 2)	247,047	50.6	+8.9
Labour	Arthur Rae (elected 3)	239,307	49.0	
Liberal	John Gray (defeated)	214,889	44.0	−15.2 (Note: Change compared to the personal vote at the 1903 election.)
Liberal	Edward Pulsford (defeated)	212,150	44.0	−17.0
Liberal	John Neild (defeated)	212,150	43.4	−18.2
Independent	John Norton	50,893	10.4	
Socialist Labor	Robert Mackenzie	13,608	2.8	
Socialist Labor	James Moroney	9,660	2.0	−6.3
Socialist Labor	Thomas Hoare	8,432	1.7	
Total formal votes		1,465,767; 488,589 voters	95.3	+2.6
Informal votes		24,213	4.7	−2.6
Turnout		512,802	61.4	+9.7
Party total votes
Labour		735,566	50.5	+9.2
Liberal		647,608	44.4	−10.8 (Note: Change compared to the combined Anti-Socialist and Protectionist vote at the 1906 election.)
Independent		50,893	3.5	
Socialist Labor		23,268	1.6	−1.8

=== Elections in the 1900s ===
==== 1906 ====
Each elector voted for up to three candidates. Percentages refer to the number of voters rather than the number of votes.

1906 Australian federal election: Senate, New South Wales
Party	Candidate	Votes	%	±%
Anti-Socialist	Albert Gould (re-elected 1)	197,663	55.9	
Anti-Socialist	James Walker (re-elected 2)	194,335	55.0	
Anti-Socialist	Edward Millen (re-elected 3)	191,353	54.2	
Labour	Allan McDougall	148,728	42.1	
Labour	George Clark	146,997	41.6	
Labour	Greg McGirr	138,592	39.2	
Socialist Labor	James Moroney	15,941	4.5	
Socialist Labor	Thomas Batho	14,316	4.1	
Socialist Labor	John Willcox	12,035	3.4	
Total formal votes		1,059,960; 353,320 voters	92.7	−2.4
Informal votes		28,016	7.3	+2.4
Turnout		381,336	51.7	+4.5
Party total votes
Anti-Socialist		583,351	55.0	
Labour		434,317	41.0	
Socialist Labor		42,292	4.0	

==== 1903 ====
Each elector voted for up to three candidates. Percentages refer to the number of voters rather than the number of votes.

1903 Australian federal election: Senate, New South Wales
Party	Candidate	Votes	%	±%
Free Trade	John Neild (re-elected 1)	192,987	61.6	
Free Trade	Edward Pulsford (re-elected 2)	191,170	61.0	
Free Trade	John Gray (elected 3)	188,860	60.3	
Labour	Arthur Griffith	108,312	34.6	
Protectionist	Nathaniel Collins	66,763	21.3	
Protectionist	John Cunneen	60,200	19.2	
Socialist Labor	Andrew Thomson	25,976	8.3	
Socialist Labor	James Moroney	25924	8.3	
Independent	Henry Fletcher	23,555	7.5	
Independent	Mary Bentley	19,254	6.1	
Ind. Free Trade	Nellie Martel	18,846	6.0	
Socialist Labor	Herbert Drake	17,870	5.7	
Total formal votes		939,717; 313,239 voters	95.2	
Informal votes		15,740	4.8	
Turnout		328,979	47.9	
Party total votes
Free Trade		573,017	61.0	
Protectionist		126,963	13.5	
Labour		108,312	11.5	
Socialist Labor		69,770	7.4	
Independent		61,655	6.6	

==== 1901 ====
Each elector voted for up to six candidates; as such percentages are shown of the total number of voters rather than the total number of votes.

1901 Australian federal election: Senate, New South Wales
Party	Candidate	Votes	%	±%
Free Trade	James Walker (elected 1)	79,800	43.9	+43.9
Free Trade	Edward Millen (elected 2)	75,010	41.2	+41.2
Free Trade	Albert Gould (elected 3)	74,253	40.8	+40.8
Protectionist	Richard O'Connor (elected 4)	72,858	40.1	+40.1
Free Trade	John Neild (elected 5)	70,563	38.8	+38.8
Free Trade	Edward Pulsford (elected 6)	70,468	38.7	+38.7
Free Trade	John Gray	69,499	38.2	+38.2
Ind. Protectionist	John Norton	66,463	36.5	+36.5
Protectionist	Sir William Manning	48,110	26.4	+26.4
Protectionist	John Kidd	44,661	24.6	+24.6
Protectionist	Kenneth Mackay	41,596	22.9	+22.9
Ind. Protectionist	Richard Meagher	32,903	18.1	+18.1
Protectionist	George Waddell	32,729	18.0	+18.0
Protectionist	Mark Hammond	32,252	17.7	+17.7
Labour	Samuel Smith	31,185	17.1	+17.1
Labour	Donald Macdonell	30,416	16.7	+16.7
Ind. Protectionist	Eden George	20,136	11.1	+11.1
Ind. Free Trade	Edward Terry	18,764	10.3	+10.3
Ind. Free Trade	Harry Lassetter	17,741	9.8	+9.8
Ind. Protectionist	Harrie Wood	14,736	8.1	+8.1
Independent	Denis O'Sullivan	12,928	7.1	+7.1
Ind. Free Trade	George Cox	11,263	6.2	+6.2
Ind. Free Trade	Francis Cotton	9,170	5.0	+5.0
Independent	John Cook	7,422	4.1	+4.1
Ind. Free Trade	Charles Royle	7,216	4.0	+4.0
Ind. Free Trade	Francis Abigail	7,164	3.9	+3.9
Ind. Free Trade	John Griffin	6,502	3.6	+3.6
Socialist Labor	John Neill	5,952	3.3	+3.3
Ind. Protectionist	William Read	5,836	3.2	+3.2
Socialist Labor	Andrew Thomson	5,823	3.2	+3.2
Ind. Free Trade	Sam Rosa	5,560	3.1	+3.1
Ind. Protectionist	Richard Colonna-Close	5,147	2.8	+2.8
Socialist Labor	Harry Holland	4,771	2.6	+2.6
Socialist Labor	James Moroney	4,257	2.3	+2.3
Ind. Free Trade	Lindsay Thompson	4,005	2.2	+2.2
Ind. Protectionist	Patrick Lynch	3,876	2.1	+2.1
Ind. Protectionist	Walter Quinn	3,700	2.0	+2.0
Independent	Thomas Edwards	3,580	2.0	+2.0
Socialist Labor	Thomas Melling	3,495	1.9	+1.9
Ind. Protectionist	David Fealy	3,411	1.9	+1.9
Ind. Protectionist	William Richardson	3,289	1.8	+1.8
Socialist Labor	James Morrish	3,109	1.7	+1.7
Independent	Francis Brown	2,998	1.6	+1.6
Independent	John Blake	2,906	1.6	+1.6
Ind. Free Trade	William Shipway	2,776	1.5	+1.5
Independent	William Flynn	2,736	1.5	+1.5
Ind. Free Trade	Andrew Armstrong	2,348	1.3	+1.3
Ind. Free Trade	James Moriarty	2,366	1.3	+1.3
Independent	William Gocher	2,172	1.2	+1.2
Independent	David Gash	1,473	0.8	+0.8
Total formal votes		1,091,394; 181,899 valid ballots	82.5	
Informal votes		38,674	17.5	
Turnout		220,573	100.0	
Party total votes
Free Trade		439,593	40.3	+40.3
Protectionist		272,206	24.9	+24.9
Ind. Protectionist		153,688	14.1	+14.1
Ind. Free Trade		94,870	8.7	+8.7
Labour		61,601	5.6	+5.6
Independent		36,215	3.3	+3.3
Socialist Labor		27,347	2.5	+2.5

== See also ==
- List of senators from New South Wales
