= Sue West =

Australian politician (born 1947)

Deputy President of the Senate
- In office 6 May 1997 – 30 June 2002
- President: Margaret Reid
- Preceded by: Mal Colston
- Succeeded by: John Hogg

Senator for New South Wales
- In office 1 July 1990 – 30 June 2002
- In office 11 February 1987 – 5 June 1987
- Preceded by: Doug McClelland

Personal details
- Born: 21 September 1947 (age 78) Cowra, New South Wales, Australia
- Party: Labor
- Spouse: Peter Martin (m. 1987)
- Education: Cumberland College of Health Sciences
- Profession: Nurse

Suzanne Margaret West (born 21 September 1947) is a former Australian politician and nurse who was the first woman to serve as a Senator for New South Wales. A member of the Australian Labor Party (ALP), she was appointed to the Senate in February 1987 following the resignation of Doug McClelland. She lost her seat at the 1987 federal election but returned at the 1990 election and was re-elected in 1996. She did not seek re-election in 2001 and retired at the expiration of her term in June 2002.

== Early life ==
West was born and raised in Cowra, New South Wales, the daughter of Edna (née Bennett) and Tim West. Her father was a grazier and ALP member who stood for state parliament on four occasions without success. She grew up on the family property 15 miles (24 km) outside of Cowra, and was educated at Blackfriars Correspondence School, Cowra Public School, and Cowra High School. She then trained as a nurse at Cowra District Hospital before moving to Sydney and completing a certificate in midwifery at King George V Memorial Hospital.

Before entering politics, West worked as registered nurse at Royal Prince Alfred Hospital, the Glebe Health Centre, with the Capital Health Commission in Canberra, and at clinics in Cootamundra and Gundagai. She held membership of the New South Wales College of Nursing and Royal College of Nursing. West additionally completed a diploma in community nursing at the Cumberland College of Health Sciences in 1977. She subsequently served on the council of the Mitchell College of Advanced Education in Bathurst from 1978 to 1984.

== Politics ==
West joined the ALP in 1975. She was the party's candidate in the Division of Hume, a safe National Country Party seat, at the 1980 federal election. In 1983 she moved to Bathurst to join the staff of the local MP David Simmons. She was an unsuccessful candidate for the Senate at the 1983 and 1984 federal elections, on both occasions being placed on the bottom of the ticket.

=== Senate ===
In February 1987, West was appointed to the Senate to fill a casual vacancy caused by the resignation of Doug McClelland. She was the first woman to represent New South Wales in the Senate. West used her maiden speech to defend the controversial Australia Card, which she had worked on while in Simmons' office. Her first term was cut short by a double dissolution after only a few months. She was again placed last on the ALP ticket at the subsequent election and lost her seat.

West returned to the Senate at the 1990 election, having worked as a ministerial consultant in the meantime. She won election over incumbent Liberal senator Chris Puplick by just 243 votes on the final count. West was re-elected in 1996 in first place on the ALP ticket. In May 1997, she was elected Deputy President and Chair of Committees. Her election meant both the presidency and deputy presidency were held by women for the first time, following Margaret Reid's election as president in 1996. She held the position until her retirement in June 2002, following her decision not to contest the 2001 election.

== Later career ==
Since leaving West has held senior positions with Anglicare and the Anglican Church of Australia, including as chair of Anglicare Western NSW from 2004. She is a life member of the ALP and has served on various party committees since leaving the Senate. After the party's defeat at the 2019 New South Wales state election, she was invited to conduct an internal review of the party, along with David Campbell and Meredith Burgmann. Their report recommended a number of changes and was submitted to the party's administrative committee in February 2020.

== Personal life ==
West married Peter Martin, a retired police officer with four adult children, in March 1987. She was widowed in 1993.
