= Bill Heffernan =

Australian politician (born 1943)

The Honourable Bill Heffernan
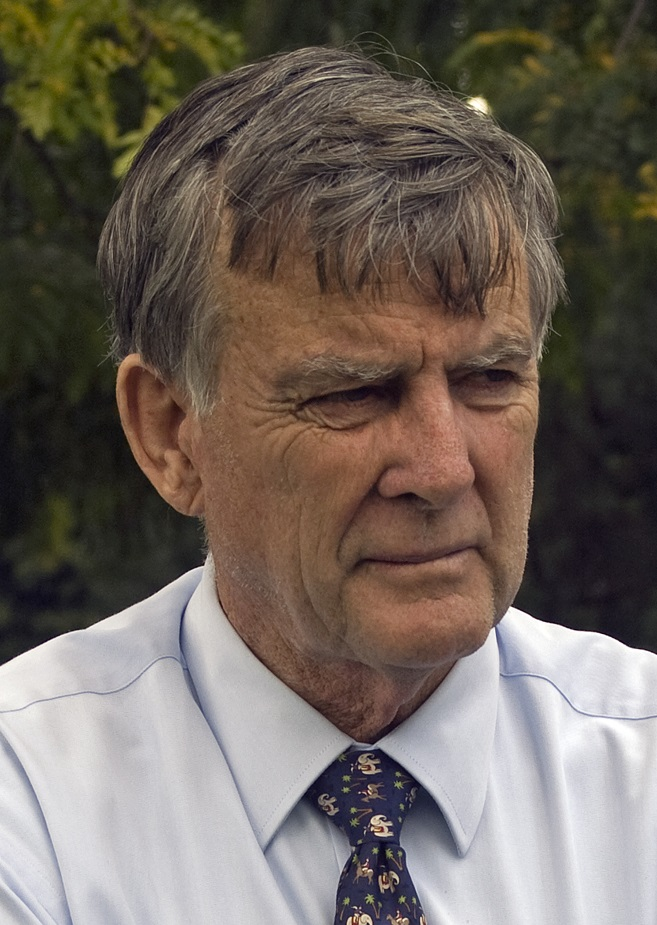
- Bill Heffernan in April 2010

Senator for New South Wales
- In office 18 September 1996 – 9 May 2016
- Preceded by: Michael Baume
- Succeeded by: Brian Burston

Personal details
- Born: 3 March 1943 (age 83) Junee, New South Wales
- Party: Liberal Party of Australia
- Occupation: Farmer

William Daniel Heffernan (born 3 March 1943), is an Australian former politician who was a Liberal Party member of the Senate representing the state of New South Wales from September 1996 to May 2016.

== Early life and background ==
Heffernan was born in Junee, New South Wales, and attended St. Joseph's College, Hunters Hill. He has qualifications in wool classing and welding from Wagga Wagga Technical College and has been a farmer in the Junee area for 30 years. Heffernan lives with his wife, Margaret.

Heffernan was a member of the Junee Shire Council 1981–96 and was President of the Council 1989–90 and 1991–93. He was active in the Liberal Party for many years and was the party's NSW State President 1993–1996.

He unsuccessfully ran for the Liberal Party in the 1993 federal election for the seat of Riverina.

== Political career ==
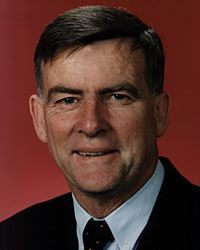
Heffernan shortly after his appointment to Parliament.

In September 1996, the NSW Parliament appointed Heffernan to replace Liberal Senator Michael Baume, whose resignation created a casual vacancy. Heffernan had been a long-time friend and supporter of then Prime Minister John Howard in the NSW Liberal Party, and in October 1998, after he was elected in his own right to a six-year term in the Senate, he was appointed Parliamentary Secretary to the Cabinet, a position giving him easy access to the Prime Minister.

He was involved in bringing the first and second readings of the bill which became the Environment Protection and Biodiversity Conservation Act 1999.

He was reelected twice, in 2004 and 2010, and was the Chair of the Senate Select Committee on Agricultural and Related Industries, Rural & Regional Affairs Policy Committee, Member of Senate Standing Committee on Rural and Regional Affairs and Transport and Member of the Joint House Committee.

In 2007 Heffernan was appointed Chairman of the Prime Minister's Taskforce to examine the potential and opportunities for further land and water development in Northern Australia.

On 17 March 2008, Senator Heffernan announced the establishment of a Senate Inquiry looking at the implications for Australian farmers of world chemical and fertiliser supply and pricing arrangements, monopolistic and cartel behaviour and related matters. In the same month Heffernan announced the establishment of a Senate Inquiry into Meat Marketing. The Senate Standing Committee on Rural and Regional Affairs and Transport looked at the need for effective supervision of national standards and controls and the national harmonisation of regulations applying to the branding and marketing of meat.

On 12 November 2008, Senator Heffernan announced that a Senate Inquiry would be launched to examine gene patents, saying: "Patents should be for inventions, not for naturally occurring genes." The Senate Standing Committee on Community Affairs was to inquire into the granting of patent monopolies in Australia over human and microbial genes and non-coding sequences, proteins and their derivatives. Heffernan said "the granting of gene patents has the potential to have a detrimental impact on healthcare costs, medical research, provision of training and accreditation for healthcare professionals as well as the health and wellbeing of all Australians." "Patents should be for inventions not for naturally occurring genes, these patents will disrupt future breast and prostate cancer testing and research", Heffernan said. Following the launch of the Senate Inquiry into Gene Patents by Heffernan, Mervyn Jacobsen, the founder and 40 per cent shareholder of the Melbourne company Genetic Technologies, which holds the patents for BRCA1 and BRCA2, backed down from threatened legal action.

On 19 February 2016, Heffernan announced he would not be a candidate at the 2016 federal election, and would retire at the end of his current term. His term ended at the double dissolution of 9 May 2016.

=== Criticisms of public figures ===
==== Justice Kirby and subsequent parliamentary censure ====
On 12 March 2002, speaking in the Senate under parliamentary privilege, Heffernan made accusations against a serving judge. Only at the end of this speech did Heffernan make it clear that the judge he was referring to was Justice Michael Kirby of the High Court of Australia. Senators John Faulkner and Robert Ray (Labor) and Aden Ridgeway (Australian Democrats) each alleged that Heffernan had deliberately structured his speech this way in order to conceal the fact that he was violating parliamentary standing orders. Standing Order 193 prohibits senators from making "imputations of improper motives or personal reflections" on currently serving judicial officers.

Heffernan's allegations against Kirby included the inappropriate use of a Commonwealth car to solicit sex from an under-age male prostitute, and to support these claims he produced what appeared to be a driver's log book recording the alleged trip. The documents were found to be a forgery. Heffernan came under prolonged political pressure as a result of this episode, and was eventually asked by Prime Minister John Howard to resign his post as Parliamentary Secretary, which he did. On 19 March, he made a statement to the Senate in which he withdrew the claims. Immediately following this statement, Heffernan was censured by the Senate "on the voices". The Prime Minister was also censured for his involvement in the episode by an amendment to the censure motion which passed 31–30, with Coalition government senators voting against it. The censure motion read as follows:

That the Senate—

(a) notes that:

(i) on 13 March 2002 the Deputy President (Senator West) ruled that Senator Heffernan's speech on the address-in-reply debate on 12 March 2002 was in breach of standing order 193, in that it contained offensive words, imputations of improper motives and personal reflections on a judicial officer, and
(ii) the ruling recorded that Senator Heffernan's speech was so structured that it was impossible for the chair to detect that the speech was in breach of the standing orders until the very end of the speech; and

(b) censures Senator Heffernan for:

(i) breaching standing order 193 by his reckless and highly disorderly attack on a judicial officer,
(ii) making such serious allegations on the basis of insubstantial evidence,
(iii) failing to refer all the alleged evidence in his possession to the proper authorities for investigation prior to making his allegations in the Parliament,
(iv) recklessly disregarding resolution 9 of the Senate's Privileges Resolutions (of 25 February 1988) which require senators to balance their responsibilities with the rights of others, and
(v) abusing the trust of senators by speaking in such a manner that neither the chair nor senators could detect that he was in the process of breaching standing order 193.

(c) censures the Prime Minister (Mr Howard) for not preventing Senator Heffernan's reckless and abusive actions in the Senate and for not acting immediately, after 12 March 2002, to reverse the effect of those actions.

==== People from Irish backgrounds ====
At a Senate Estimates Hearing in Canberra, Heffernan called the Irish-born head of Qantas, Alan Joyce, "an old Irish bomb maker", saying "Mr Joyce, if the power was yours, you know from being an old Irish bomb maker, if you had the choice, what would be the ideal pilot training?" During the hearing, he also made comments about having a beer in a three-minute break and there being no whisky in the water. He made similar comments to Liberal party member Julian McGauran, saying "Senator McGauran are you, do you come from a long line of Irish bomb-makers, do you?"

==== Coalition colleagues ====
On 7 February 2006, The Sydney Morning Herald reported that Heffernan had been forced to apologise to National Party senator Fiona Nash after a public altercation at Canberra Airport the previous day, during which he had told her to "blow it out her backside". Senator Heffernan said the airport altercation with his fellow Coalition Senator was just "a bit of colour and movement". But National Party MP De-Anne Kelly described the incident as "workplace harassment", saying "workplace harassment is not acceptable anywhere".

On 7 July 2006, the ABC program Stateline in NSW aired claims that Heffernan was involved in the downfall of former NSW opposition leader John Brogden. Alex McTaggart, independent member for Pittwater, his wife Denise, and Peter Jones, a member of McTaggart's campaign team, claimed on the program that Heffernan contacted them and said that he was the Prime Minister's [Howard's] right-hand man, and did his 'dirty work'. The McTaggarts claimed that Heffernan told them he had a dirt file on Brogden, said that Brogden needed to be 'paid back', and tried to lure them into publicising material damaging to Brogden's character. Heffernan denied these claims, and was quoted on the program saying that they were 'bullshit'.

On 20 May 2012 allegations were reported in the media that Heffernan struck a fellow Liberal party member and suspended electoral officer, Ray Carter, so hard that he was toppled onto a chair, before allegedly whispering to him "I didn't know you were a poofter." during a branch meeting on 3 May. The president of the NSW Liberal Party, fellow New South Wales Senator Arthur Sinodinos, dismissed the allegations.

==== Wood Royal Commission ====
In 2015, Heffernan used parliamentary privilege to allege that he had a document, allegedly produced to the Wood Royal Commission, that listed the names of 28 people, including prominent lawyers, suspected of visiting a "boy brothel" in Kings Cross. He stated in parliament that a former Prime Minister was among the names.

==== Other use of controversial language ====
In a public lecture given on 27 September 2005, political opponent Mark Latham accused Heffernan of engaging in the "politics of personal destruction", and quoted John Hewson (a former Liberal Party leader) as saying that John Howard had used Heffernan to distribute dirt and to run his agenda against individuals "for almost as long as I have known him".

In October 2006, Heffernan called for "someone's arse to get kicked" because of delays to the construction of the final major link in the dual carriageway between Sydney and Melbourne. According to Heffernan, a "colony of whatever they are that live in the edge of the bank of the creek" (platypus) was causing the delay and it was a problem that could be fixed "in ten minutes". He called for consultants to be axed if they were "wasting taxpayers' money".

In an interview with The Bulletin magazine in May 2007, Senator Heffernan repeated previously stated views that priests should be able to marry because "... priests, like the rest of us, wake up with a horn at four in the morning."

In the same Bulletin interview, Heffernan caused widespread outrage by suggesting the unmarried and childless Deputy Leader of the Opposition Julia Gillard was unfit for leadership because she was "deliberately barren". He continued: "I mean, anyone who chooses to remain deliberately barren ... they’ve got no idea what life's about." Heffernan later apologised for the remarks.

The Bulletin published an interview which quoted Heffernan as stating that Australia had to "settle the north" because millions of people in Asia may find it a "very attractive proposition" if climate change leaves them water-poor. Heffernan later denied he had made such claims but The Bulletin stood by the accuracy of its report, citing an audio recording of the Heffernan interview.

On 2 December 2014, during the parliament's last sitting week of the year, Heffernan rang the office of Liberal Democrat senator David Leyonhjelm in order to get Leyonhjelm to drop his threat to block government legislation if the Coalition party-room failed to allow a conscience vote on his (Leyonhjelm's) bill to legalise same-sex marriage. When Leyonhjelm later appeared in the Senate chamber, Heffernan called him a "terrorist", to which Leyonhjelm responded by telling Heffernan to "fuck off", three times.

=== Practical jokes ===
During the New South Wales 2007 state election, Heffernan was accused of stealing Greens how-to-vote cards and misrepresenting Greens policies to voters. He was reported as shouting "If you want to decriminalise drugs for your children, vote Green". Police were called but he was not arrested.

According to The Age newspaper, in 2007 Heffernan posed as an ASIO agent in a telephone call to John Grabbe, a farm manager in New South Wales. Under the Crimes Act it is an offence to impersonate a Commonwealth officer.

On 30 August 2010, Heffernan admitted being the caller who rang NSW independent MP Rob Oakeshott, and introduced himself as "the devil". The phone call was answered by Oakeshott's wife, who assumed it was a prank call and hung up, before Heffernan gave his name. Oakeshott accused the Liberal-National Coalition of dirty tactics and described the introduction as "Rambo-style". Heffernan said he had been introducing himself as such for a while.

Heffernan is also reported to have impersonated Senator Barnaby Joyce during a telephone conversation with one of his constituents.

On 26 May 2014, Heffernan smuggled an imitation pipe bomb into Parliament House and presented it at a Senate hearing, arguing it showed the new security arrangements at Parliament were inadequate. Previously, everybody entering Parliament House had to undergo security checks. Under the new system, Members of Parliament, their staff and family, as well as parliamentary staff can enter the building without being scanned, and their belongings unchecked. In response, the Australian Federal Police Commissioner Tony Negus admitted passholders bringing in unauthorised objects "is a risk", but that the AFP regularly consults with parliamentary officials about appropriate security measures.
