= John Williams (Australian senator) =

Australian politician

John Williams AM
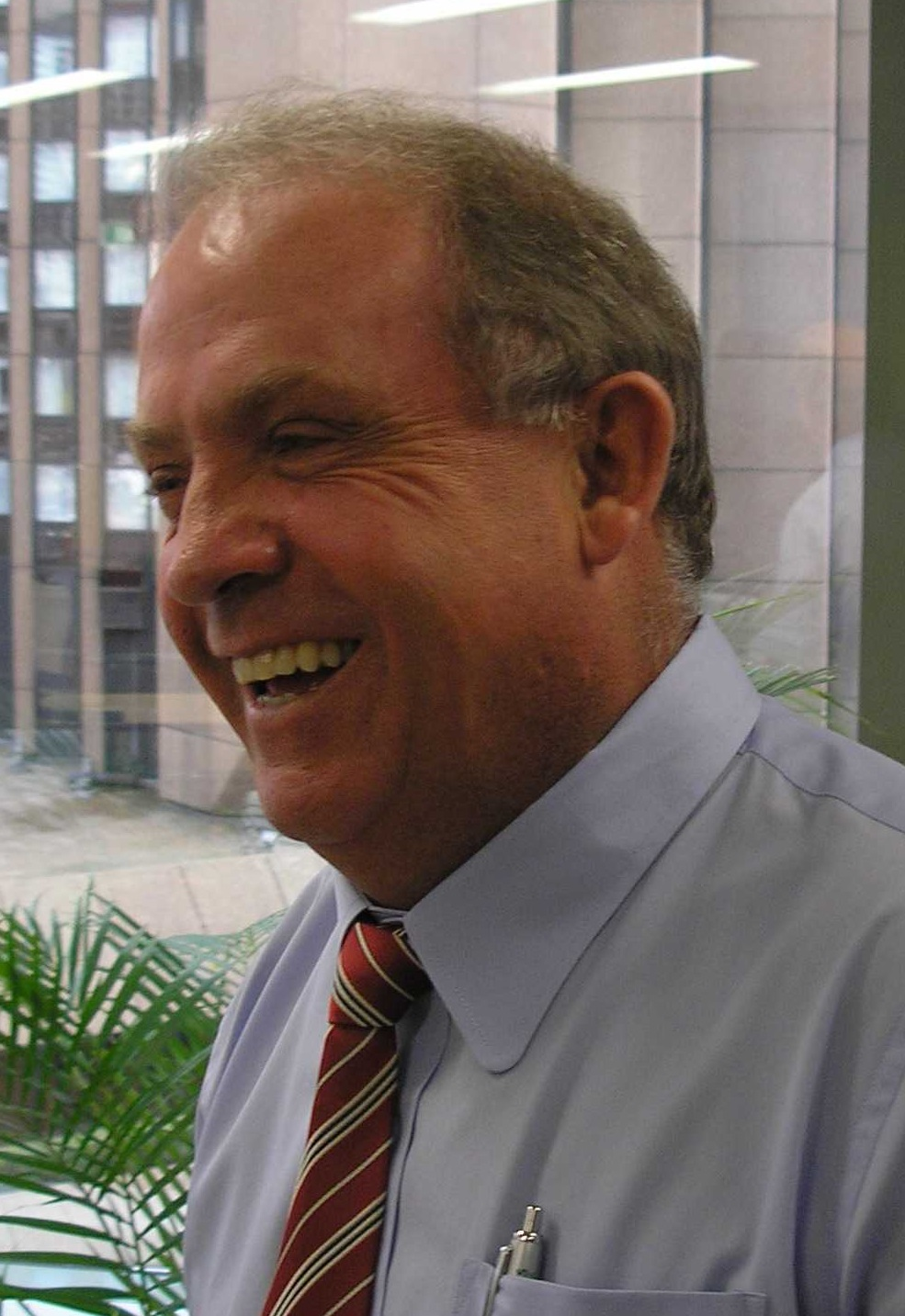

Senator for New South Wales
- In office 1 July 2008 – 30 June 2019
- Preceded by: Sandy Macdonald
- Succeeded by: Perin Davey

Personal details
- Born: 16 January 1955 (age 71) Jamestown, South Australia, Australia
- Party: National
- Spouse: Nancy Capel
- Children: 3
- Education: Rostrevor College, South Australian Institute of Technology
- Occupation: Farmer, small businessman

John Reginald "Wacka" Williams AM (born 16 January 1955) is an Australian politician. He was a Nationals member of the Australian Senate from July 2008 to June 2019, representing the state of New South Wales.

Williams was first elected to the Senate at the 2007 federal election. This followed his victory over incumbent Senator Sandy Macdonald in preselection for the National Party's one winnable spot on the Coalition Senate ticket in New South Wales.

Williams was born in Jamestown, South Australia. Prior to entering politics, he was a truck driver, a farmer, a sheep shearer and a small business owner. Williams attended Rostrevor College as a boarding student.

Williams' vote was the third out of five votes required to give Barnaby Joyce the Senate leadership in September 2008.

Williams is consulted by the media in relation to the Royal Commission into Misconduct in the Banking, Superannuation and Financial Services Industry being one the earliest and strongest advocates for such an inquiry. He was the sole Government Senator to cross the floor to vote against his party on a number of occasions in support of a Royal Commission into banking prior to 2017. Most critically, he had gathered sufficient supporters in his party by December 2017 for a Parliamentary Inquiry into Banking such that the Government was facing certain defeat in the House of Representatives. At this time, the Banks themselves wrote to the Government requesting a Royal Commission although they had always been opposed. As a result, the Government acceded to the Banks' request and thus avoided a House vote defeat.

Referring to the ministerial resignation of Jamie Briggs in December 2015, Williams said "With Briggs leaving, it means there will be no deterioration in the overall quality of the ministry, in fact it should improve."

In May 2016 he said that his current term, due to expire on 30 June 2019, would be his last.

He is a public opponent of same sex marriage, and was one of twelve senators who voted against the 2017 bill.

Williams was appointed a Member of the Order of Australia in the 2024 Australia Day Honours for his "significant service to the Parliament of Australia, and to the community".
