= Bruce Childs =

Australian politician (1934–2023)

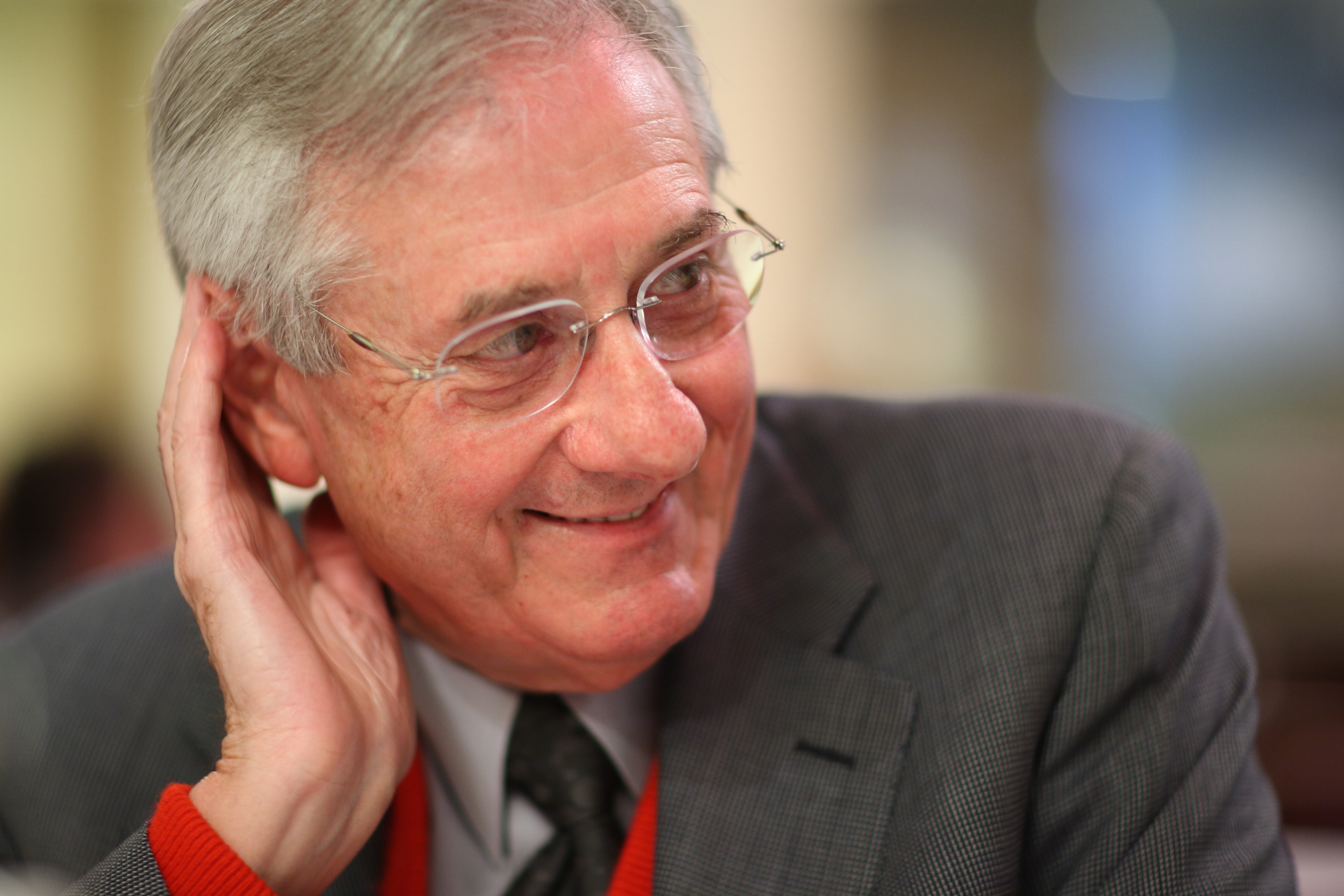
- Childs in 2008

Senator for New South Wales
- In office 1 July 1981 – 10 September 1997
- Succeeded by: George Campbell

Personal details
- Born: 23 August 1934 Sydney, New South Wales, Australia
- Died: 4 May 2023 (aged 88)
- Party: Labor
- Profession: Photo engraver

Bruce Kenneth Childs (23 August 1934 – 4 May 2023) was an Australian politician. Born in Sydney, he was a tradesman in photo engraving and a secretary of the Printing and Kindred Industries Union before becoming Assistant General Secretary of the New South Wales Labor Party 1971–1980. In 1980, he was elected to the Australian Senate as a Labor Senator for New South Wales. He resigned his place on 10 September 1997, and was replaced by George Campbell.

Bruce Childs died on 4 May 2023, at the age of 88.
