= Perin Davey =

Australian politician

Deputy Leader of the National Party
- In office 30 May 2022 – 12 May 2025
- Leader: David Littleproud
- Preceded by: David Littleproud
- Succeeded by: Kevin Hogan

Deputy Leader of the National Party in the Senate
- In office 27 September 2022 – 30 June 2025
- Leader: David Littleproud
- Preceded by: Matt Canavan
- Succeeded by: Susan McDonald

Senator for New South Wales
- In office 1 July 2019 – 30 June 2025
- Preceded by: John Williams
- Succeeded by: Warwick Stacey

Personal details
- Born: 5 February 1972 (age 54) Sydney, New South Wales, Australia
- Citizenship: Australian; British (1972–2018)
- Party: National (since 1998)
- Occupation: Businesswoman; Politician

Perin McGregor Davey (born 5 February 1972) is an Australian politician. She was a Senator for New South Wales from 2019 to 2025, representing the National Party. She served as the party's deputy leader from 2022 to 2025.

== Early career ==
Davey was born in Sydney on 5 February 1972. Her father Paul Davey was an ABC journalist who worked in the Canberra Press Gallery and later served as federal director of the National Party. He was born in England and she held British citizenship by descent until renouncing it in 2018 to stand for parliament.

Davey grew up in Canberra, attending Curtin Primary School and Alfred Deakin High School. After leaving school, she spent three years as a cadet journalist for the Mudgee Guardian. During the 1990s, she worked as an extra via a casting agency, making television appearances on Home & Away, E Street, and Water Rats, and appearing in the films Heavenly Creatures and Two Hands. She was also a safari cook in Botswana for three years. Davey later worked as a consultant for public relations firm Gavin Anderson & Co. (2000–2005), as a farm administrator for the Australian Agricultural Company (2005–2010), and as water policy adviser and corporate affairs manager for Murray Irrigation Limited (2010–2017). She also had two periods of service as a reservist with the Royal Australian Army Ordnance Corps (1990–1993, 1998–2005).

Davey served on the board of the New South Wales Irrigators' Council from 2014 to 2016 and in 2017 was nominated to the board of the Murray-Darling Basin Authority by federal agriculture and water minister Barnaby Joyce. Her nomination was opposed by South Australian water minister Ian Hunter on the grounds that she was not independent. She eventually asked Joyce to withdraw her nomination, after it was reported that a New South Wales government official had been recorded offering her government data to "help irrigators exploit the Murray-Darling Basin Plan".

== Politics ==
Davey joined the Nationals in 1998 and worked as a media adviser to Senator Ron Boswell in 2000. Before entering parliament, she held various offices in the New South Wales branch, including vice-chairman of the women's council, central council member, and chairman of the Deniliquin branch.

Davey was elected to the Senate at the 2019 federal election, in third place on the Coalition's ticket in New South Wales. Her term began on 1 July 2019. She was subsequently elected as the Nationals' Senate whip.

In a leadership spill following the 2022 federal election, Davey was elected deputy leader of the Nationals in place of David Littleproud, who had been elected to succeed Barnaby Joyce as leader.

In February 2024, Davey attracted criticism for speaking in a slurred manner during a Senate estimates committee meeting after having attended a National Party drinks event. However, Davey later explained that her speaking difficulties were the result of a medical problem.

At the 2025 federal election, Davey was again third on the Coalition Senate ticket, but failed to retain her seat. She was succeeded as deputy leader by New South Wales MP Kevin Hogan.

== Personal life ==
Davey lives with her husband John Dickie and two daughters on a property in Conargo, New South Wales, just outside Deniliquin. As of 2019 she also owned an investment property in Canberra.
