= Clair Isbister =

Australian paediatrician (1915 – 2008)

Jean Sinclair "Clair" Isbister CBE, née Paton (12 September 1915 – 20 August 2008) was an Australian paediatrician.

She was born in Brisbane to Peter Sinclair Paton and Hannah, née Beet. Dux of St George Girls High School, she won scholarships to study at the University of Sydney. She received a Bachelor of Medicine Sydney in 1938 and a Diploma of Child Health from the University of London in 1949. Having met James Isbister at university, she graduated with him in 1938, working first at Royal Prince Alfred Hospital and then at the Royal Alexandra Hospital for Children. They were married at Scots Church, Sydney, in 1940. She became consultant paediatrician at Royal North Shore Hospital in 1948, a position she held until her retirement in 1980.

Isbister was the most prominent Australian paediatrician of her day, with radio and television appearances as well as books making her well-known. A staunch social conservative, she was on record opposing premarital sex, de facto relationships, infidelity and abortion. She was created an Officer of the Order of the British Empire in 1969 and Commander in 1977. Associated with the Festival of Light, she stood twice for the Senate as a candidate for Fred Nile's Call to Australia group.

Due to her significant contributions to medicine, Isbister Street in the Canberra suburb of Macgregor was named in her honour.

== Select publications ==
- Isbister, Clair (1971). Birth, infancy and childhood. Farleigh Press.
- —— (1976). Birth of a family a guide for expectant parents and those who care about children. Melbourne Thomas Nelson (Australia). ISBN 978-0-17-005062-3.
- —— (1985). Breast feeding for modern mothers. Hodder and Stoughton. ISBN 978-0-340-36635-6.
- —— (1992). I'm sick! : when to call the doctor. Sally Milner Publications. ISBN 978-1-86351-060-8.
