= George Campbell (Australian politician) =

Australian politician and trade unionist

Senator for New South Wales
- In office 17 September 1997 – 30 June 2008
- Preceded by: Bruce Childs

Personal details
- Born: 18 February 1943 (age 83) Belfast, Northern Ireland
- Party: Australian Labor Party
- Occupation: Shipwright

George Campbell (born 18 February 1943) is an Australian former politician and trade unionist who served as an Australian Labor Party member of the Australian Senate from 1997 to 2008, representing the state of New South Wales.

== Biography ==
Campbell was born in Belfast, Northern Ireland, and worked as a shipwright, including at the Williamstown dockyard, before entering politics. Campbell served as Victorian State Secretary of the Federated Shipwrights' and Ship Constructors' Union between 1970 and 1976, National President in 1974 and Federal Secretary between 1974 and 1976. In 1976 the Federated Shipwrights Union merged into the Amalgamated Metal Workers Union (AMWU) and Campbell became Assistant National Secretary, serving in that role until 1988 and as National Secretary between 1988 and 1996. He was a member of the executive of the Australian Council of Trade Unions between 1987 and 1997 and ACTU Senior Vice-president from 1993 to 1997.

Campbell was a member of the ALP National Executive from 1986 to 2004 and Junior Vice-president of the ALP from 1994 to 2000. He was a prominent member of the Socialist Left faction of the ALP, and a leading critic of the U.S.-Australia Free Trade Agreement.

Campbell was Parliamentary Secretary to the Shadow Minister for Industry, Innovation, Science and Research 2001–04. From the 2004 election, he served as the Opposition Senate Whip.

In April 2007, facing near-certain defeat in a preselection challenge by former protégé Doug Cameron, he announced that he would retire at the end of his term in the Senate.
