= Sandy Macdonald =

Australian politician (born 1954)

The Honourable Sandy Macdonald AM

Senator from New South Wales
- In office 1 July 1993 – 30 June 1999
- In office 4 May 2000 – 30 June 2008
- Preceded by: David Brownhill
- Succeeded by: John Williams

Personal details
- Born: 10 May 1954 (age 72) Quirindi, New South Wales
- Party: National Party of Australia
- Education: University of Sydney and St Paul's College, University of Sydney
- Occupation: Wool and beef farmer

John Alexander Lindsay Macdonald, AM (born 10 May 1954) is a former Australian politician. He was member of the Australian Senate from 1993 to 1998, and again from 2000 to 2008, representing the state of New South Wales for the National Party.

== Early life ==
Macdonald was born in Quirindi, New South Wales and was educated at Sydney University, where he graduated in law. He was a wool and beef farmer before entering politics.

== Political career ==
Macdonald was the third Senate candidate for the Coalition at the 1998 federal election but narrowly lost his seat to Aden Ridgeway of the Australian Democrats. In May 2000, he regained a seat in the Senate following the resignation of National Party Senator David Brownhill. In June 2005, Macdonald was made Parliamentary Secretary to the Minister for Trade, and in January 2006, Parliamentary Secretary to the Minister for Defence.

Macdonald was at the centre of an allegation of a breach of the Commonwealth Electoral Act. Independent Member for New England, Tony Windsor, claimed through an interview with Tony Vermeer from The Sunday Telegraph that he had been approached, in May 2004, by a figure associated with the National Party with the offer of a diplomatic position in exchange for retiring from politics. Windsor made the allegations during the course of the 2004 Federal election campaign, some five months after the alleged incident occurred. The Australian Electoral Commission referred the matter to the Australian Federal Police (AFP). Windsor was re-elected and, in November 2004, speaking under parliamentary privilege, said that National Party leader John Anderson and Macdonald had made the offer through an intermediary, Tamworth businessman Greg McGuire. Windsor also claimed that the AFP had referred the matter to the Commonwealth Director of Public Prosecutions for determination. Anderson, Macdonald, and McGuire denied the claims. The AFP invistaged Windsor's claims and advised that the matter will not be prosecuted.

In October 2006, Macdonald refused a National Party endorsement on the joint senate ticket for the forthcoming 2007 Australian federal election. Macdonald retired from the Senate at the expiry of his term, on 30 June 2008 after the defeat of the Howard Government .

== Post political career ==
He was appointed a director of Defence Housing Australia in August 2008 by the Rudd Government. He was also appointed a director of Incremental Oil and Gas Ltd ( formerly a director of Incremental Petroleum Ltd) in 2008. In February 2015 Macdonald was appointed Chairman of Defence Housing Australia.

Macdonald was awarded Member of the Order of Australia (AM) in the 2021 Australia Day Honours, for "For significant service to the people and Parliament of Australia, and to public administration."
