= Aden Ridgeway =

Australian politician (born 1962)

7th Deputy Leader of the Australian Democrats
- In office 6 April 2001 – 21 August 2002
- Leader: Natasha Stott Despoja
- Preceded by: Natasha Stott Despoja; Brian Greig
- Succeeded by: Lyn Allison

Senator for New South Wales
- In office 1 July 1999 – 30 June 2005
- Preceded by: Sandy Macdonald
- Succeeded by: Fiona Nash

Personal details
- Born: Aden Derek Ridgeway Nambucca Heads, New South Wales, Australia
- Party: Democrat
- Education: St John's College
- Alma mater: University of Technology Sydney
- Occupation: Executive director (NSW Aboriginal Land Council); Organisation executive (Aboriginal and Torres Strait Islander Commission)
- Profession: Public servant Politician

Aden Derek Ridgeway (born 18 September 1962) is an Australian former politician. He was a member of the Australian Senate for New South Wales from 1999 to 2005, representing the Australian Democrats. He was the only Indigenous member of the Australian Parliament for the duration of his term.

== Early life and education ==
Aden Derek Ridgeway was born on the Bellwood Aboriginal reserve in Nambucca Heads (close to Macksville, New South Wales), as one of the Gumbaynggirr people.

He was educated at Bellwood and St John's College, Woodlawn in Lismore.

== Early career ==
After leaving school in Year 11, he worked as a boilermaker. He then became involved in the public service, engaging in a number of careers, including being a park ranger, and working in several New South Wales government departments.

In 1990, Ridgeway was elected onto the first ATSIC Sydney Regional Council, a position in which he served two terms of office.

In 1994, he became the Executive Director of the New South Wales Aboriginal Land Council. He continued in this position until 1998. Also in 1994, he became a trustee of the Australian Museum Trust.

He became a Member of the Geographical Names Board of New South Wales from 1995.

He was the Director of the Public Service Board Staff Credit Union from 1996 to 1998.

== Political career ==
Ridgeway joined the Australian Democrats in 1990. During 1997–98 he served as the state policy convener for the New South Wales Branch of the Democrats. He was subsequently selected in the first position on the Democrats' Senate ticket at the 1998 election.

He has served on a number of parliamentary and senate committees.

In April 2001, Ridgeway was elected deputy leader of the Democrats, after Natasha Stott Despoja toppled Meg Lees in a leadership spill.

Ridgeway continued as deputy leader until August 2002, when along with fellow senators John Cherry, Lyn Allison and Andrew Murray, he succeeded in forcing Stott Despoja to resign. It was widely tipped that he would succeed her as leader. However, the media did not portray the spill kindly, labelling them the "Gang of Four".

Ridgeway was expected to be appointed interim leader however, in a surprise decision, the party's National Executive installed Brian Greig as interim leader due to the role Ridgeway played in forcing the resignation of Stott Despoja. He did not contest the subsequent leadership ballot, at which Andrew Bartlett defeated Brian Greig. He was technically leader between Natasha Stott Despoja's resignation and the appointment of Brian Greig as interim leader.

Ridgeway also stood down as deputy leader and was replaced by Lyn Allison. He did not contest the leadership and stood down as deputy leader as he felt the National Executive's decision not to appoint him as interim leader was a reflection on him in a leadership position.

He remained in the Senate, being particularly active on issues of Indigenous Affairs and reconciliation. He lost his seat in the 2004 election, along with Cherry, Lees (who had since left the party), and Greig. His term expired on 30 June 2005.

== Post-political career ==
Ridgeway received the NAIDOC Person of the Year award in 2005 and was made chair of the National NAIDOC Committee, a role that he occupied until 2008.

In May 2006, Ridgeway was selected as the new host of ABC Television's Message Stick program. He was the inaugural chairman of Indigenous Tourism Australia.

In 2007, Ridgeway partnered with Tim Powell of Cox Inall Communications to establish Cox Inall Ridgeway, a social change agency that seeks to disrupt disadvantage in Indigenous communities. The agency is based on the lands of the Eora Nation (Walsh Bay, New South Wales), and Ridgeway is currently a partner in the business.

Ridgeway was Chairman of Bangarra Dance Theatre from 1998 to 2010.

In February 2013, Ridgeway was announced as a spokesperson for the Recognise campaign, a movement to recognise Aboriginal and Torres Strait Islander peoples in the Australian Constitution. In May 2013, he was one of a number of Aboriginal leaders to start the "Journey to Recognition", a relay across Australia to raise awareness of the issue.

On 4 March 2020, it was announced that Ridgeway would be a member of the Local and Regional Co-Design Group for the Indigenous voice to government, set up in late 2019.

As of 2023, Ridgeway is on the board of the Muurrbay Aboriginal Language and Culture Co-operative, a research and teaching centre for a group of Aboriginal languages in New South Wales, in Nambucca.
