= Chris Puplick =

Australian politician

Chris Puplick AM

Senator for New South Wales
- In office 26 July 1978 – 30 June 1981
- Preceded by: Sir Robert Cotton
- In office 1 December 1984 – 30 June 1990

Personal details
- Born: Christopher John Guelph Puplick; 13 May 1948 (age 78) London, England
- Party: Liberal Party of Australia
- Education: University of Sydney
- Occupation: Private sector consultant

Christopher John Guelph Puplick AM (/ˈpʊplɪk/ PUUP-lik; born 13 May 1948) is an Australian former politician. He was a Senator for New South Wales from 1978 to 1981 and from 1984 to 1990, representing the Liberal Party.

== Early life ==
Puplick was born on 13 May 1948 in London, England. He was the son of Elsie Nancy (née Liddaman) and Guelph Puplick. His father, a salesman and manager, was born in Hyderabad, British India.

Puplick spent his early years in London and Cardiff, attending The Cathedral School, Llandaff, and Preston Manor County Grammar School. He and his family immigrated to Australia in 1962, settling in Sydney where he attended Manly Boys' High School. He went on to the University of Sydney, graduating Bachelor of Arts (Hons.) in 1968 and Master of Arts in 1969.

== Politics ==
Puplick joined the Young Liberal Movement in 1965 at the encouragement of Bill Wentworth. He was the federal president of the Young Liberals from 1975 to 1978.

After leaving university, Puplick worked as a campaign director and press secretary for Wentworth. After the Coalition's defeat at the 1972 federal election he worked in the offices of Nigel Bowen, Bob Cotton and Peter Baume. He was a member of the state and federal executives of the party and was an unsuccessful preselection candidate for state seats in 1975 and 1978.

=== Senate ===
He was appointed to a casual vacancy in the Senate in July 1978, representing the Liberal Party of Australia, but was defeated at the 1980 election, completing his term in June 1981.

He was returned to the Senate at the 1984 election. In the 1990 election, the Call to Australia party made the unusual choice of preferencing the Labor Party above the Liberal Party specifically to prevent Puplick's re-election; Puplick was not re-elected and his term finished in June 1990.

== After Parliament ==
After leaving Parliament, Puplick was appointed President of the NSW Anti-Discrimination Board and NSW Privacy Commissioner.

He was also chair of the Archive Forum, which lobbied for the establishment of the National Film and Sound Archive as an independent statutory body from 2003 until 2008, when the National Film and Sound Archive Act 2008 came into effect. from this date.

He was appointed a Member of the Order of Australia (AM) in 2001, for contributions to Australian politics and public policy, particularly in relation to human rights and social justice.

== Controversy ==
Puplick resigned his Anti-Discrimination Board and Privacy Commission positions in 2003 following allegations of administrative favouritism involving a personal friend, and a deteriorating relationship with the New South Wales Government.

== Memberships, Directorships ==
- Member, Australia Council Theatre Board
- Member, National Institute of Dramatic Art (NIDA) Board of Directors
- Chair, National Film and Sound Archive Board, 2008–2011
- Chair, Australian National Council on AIDS, Hepatitis C and Related Diseases
- NSW Privacy Commissioner, 1999–2003

== Publications ==
- Chris Puplick and R.J. Southey, 1980, Liberal Thinking, Macmillan, Melbourne.
- Chris Puplick, 1984, 'Science and Technology', in George Brandis, Tom Harley and Don Markwell (eds), Liberals Face the Future: Essays on Australian Liberalism, Oxford University Press, Melbourne.
- John Black, Michael Macklin and Chris Puplick, 1992, ‘How Parliament Works in Practice’, in Parliamentary Perspectives 1991, Papers on Parliament, No. 14, Department of the Senate, February 1992.
- Chris Puplick, October 1, 2012, Platform Papers 33: Changing Times at NIDA, Currency Press, ISBN 9780987211422.
