= Candidates of the 1998 Australian federal election =

This article provides information on candidates who stood for the 1998 Australian federal election. The election was held on 3 October 1998.

== Redistributions and seat changes ==
- Redistributions of electoral boundaries occurred in Queensland and the Australian Capital Territory.
  - In Queensland, the notionally Liberal seat of Blair was created.
    - The member for McPherson, John Bradford (Christian Democrats), contested the Senate.
    - The member for Oxley, Pauline Hanson (One Nation), contested Blair.
  - In the Australian Capital Territory, the Labor-held seat of Namadgi was abolished.
    - The member for Canberra, Bob McMullan (Labor), contested Fraser.
    - The member for Namadgi, Annette Ellis (Labor), contested Canberra.
- The member for Chisholm, Michael Wooldridge (Liberal), contested Casey.

== Retiring Members and Senators ==
=== Labor ===
- Peter Baldwin MP (Sydney, NSW)
- David Beddall MP (Rankin, Qld)
- Bob Brown MP (Charlton, NSW)
- Steve Dargavel MP (Fraser, ACT)
- Ted Grace MP (Fowler, NSW)
- Clyde Holding MP (Melbourne Ports, Vic)
- Barry Jones MP (Lalor, Vic)
- Peter Morris MP (Shortland, NSW)
- Ralph Willis MP (Gellibrand, Vic)
- Senator Margaret Reynolds (Qld)

=== Liberal ===
- Bob Halverson MP (Casey, Vic)
- Ian McLachlan MP (Barker, SA)
- Stephen Mutch MP (Cook, NSW) - lost preselection
- Bruce Reid MP (Bendigo, Vic)
- Bill Taylor MP (Groom, Qld)

=== National ===
- Michael Cobb MP (Parkes, NSW)
- Noel Hicks MP (Riverina, NSW)
- John Sharp MP (Hume, NSW)
- Ian Sinclair MP (New England, NSW)

=== Other ===
- Senator Mal Colston (Qld) – Queensland First, elected as Labor

== House of Representatives ==
Sitting members at the time of the election are shown in bold text. Successful candidates are highlighted in the relevant colour. Where there is possible confusion, an asterisk (*) is also used.

=== Australian Capital Territory ===
Electorate	Held by	Labor candidate	Liberal candidate	Democrats candidate	Greens candidate	One Nation candidate	Other candidates
Canberra	Labor	**Annette Ellis**	Ian Morison	Yulia Onsman	Sue Ellerman	Burl Doble	Maryan England (NLP); Nikki Ulasowski (DSL)
Fraser	Labor	**Bob McMullan**	Peter Smith	Jason Wood	Gordon McAllister	Chris Spence	Sue Bull (DSL); Joanne Clarke (Ind); David Seaton (NLP)

=== New South Wales ===
Electorate	Held by	Labor candidate	Coalition candidate	Democrats candidate	One Nation candidate	Greens candidate	Other candidates
Banks	Labor	**Daryl Melham**	Stephen Iacono (Lib)	Alison Bailey	Philip Maddison	Greg Archer	Bin Chen (Unity); Brian Grigg (CDP)
Barton	Labor	**Robert McClelland**	James Jordan (Lib)	Craig Chung	Neil Baird	Adam Nelson	Lin Tang (Unity)
Bennelong	Liberal	Wendy Mahon	**John Howard** (Lib)	Bob Springett	Gordon King	Jamie Parker	Marcus Aussie-Stone (Ind); Tim Carr (NLP); John Dawson (Ind); Julien Droulers (Ind); William Gollan (NAN); Sarah Kemp (Unity); David Lung (Ind); Prime Piss (ACS)
Berowra	Liberal	Nola McCarroll	**Philip Ruddock** (Lib)	Bernard Teuben	Wayne Stewart	Andrew Burke	Owen Nannelli (CDP)
Blaxland	Labor	**Michael Hatton**	Maureen Shelley (Lib)	Matthew Hua	Hussein Abou-Ghaida	Benjamin Donnelly	Harold Hassapis (Unity); Kylie Laurence (CDP)
Bradfield	Liberal	Nadesu Kailainathan	**Brendan Nelson** (Lib)	Carmel Morris	Robert Webeck	Marc Allas	Alexandra Kiely (NLP); Margaret Ratcliffe (CDP)
Calare	Independent	Terence Corkin	Rod Blume (Nat); Garry Sloan (Lib)	Ben Saul	Martin Gleeson	Joan Lambert	**Peter Andren*** (Ind); Nelle Edwards (Unity); David Simpson (CEC)
Charlton	Labor	Kelly Hoare	Bruce Gatgens (Lib)	Stephen Bisgrove	Pamela Young	Nathan Ross	Ralph Gourlay (CDP)
Chifley	Labor	**Roger Price**	John Coles (Lib)	Andrew Owen	Joe Damjanovic	Robert Nolan	Aooe Boyd Pio (Unity); Zahra Razavikashan (NLP); Dave Vincent (Ind); Joseph Wyness (CDP)
Cook	Liberal	Peri Young	Bruce Baird (Lib)	Terri Richardson	Gareth Kimberley	John Kaye	Zanthe Abdurahman (Unity); Darren Boehm (Ind); Malcolm Smith (CDP)
Cowper	National	Paul Sekfy	**Garry Nehl** (Nat)	Paul Corben	John Willey	Jillian Cranny	Mark Spencer (Ind)
Cunningham	Labor	**Stephen Martin**	Alan Akhurst (Lib)	Stephen Ivaneza	John Curtis	Les Robinson	Frank Coluccio (Ind); Robert O'Neill (CDP); Margaret Perrott (DSL); Jennifer van der Horn (Unity)
Dobell	Labor	**Michael Lee**	David Parker (Lib)	David Mott	June Beckett	Philip Dwyer	Karen Russell (CDP)
Eden-Monaro	Liberal	Steve Whan	**Gary Nairn** (Lib)	Dan McMillan	Adam Miller	Rosemary Beaumont	Gordon Harriott (CEC)
Farrer	National	Vivien Voss	**Tim Fischer** (Nat)	Rohan Sharp	Don McKinnon		Alan Boyd (CEC); Cliff Broderick (AFP); Amanda Duncan-Strelec (Ind); Maurice Furlan (ACS)
Fowler	Labor	Julia Irwin	Lorna Doona (Lib)	Mark Stevens	Rodney Smith		Andrew Su (Unity)
Gilmore	Liberal	Sandra McCarthy	**Joanna Gash** (Lib)	Peter Fraser	Tom Dell	Jane Bange	Steve Ryan (CDP)
Grayndler	Labor	**Anthony Albanese**	Michael Armani (Lib)	Katherine Cummings	Warren Webb	Sean Roberts	Ning Gao (Unity); Sylvia Hale (NAN); Michael Karadjis (DSL); Michael Robinson (CDP); John Ryder (NLP)
Greenway	Labor	**Frank Mossfield**	Mathew Cross (Lib)	Peter Reddy	Bill Nixon	Jocelyn Howden	Bob Bawden (CDP); Reynolds Bonuedi (Unity); Salvinder Dhillon (Ind)
Gwydir	National	Anne Murnain	**John Anderson** (Nat)	Ken Graham	Bob Johns		Gary Edwards (Ind); Derrick Paxton (CDP); Jim Perrett (Ind)
Hughes	Liberal	David Hill	**Danna Vale** (Lib)	Adrian Blackburn	Reginald Lowder	Jo-Anne Lentern	Jim Bowen (ACS); Martin Heald (RPA); Suthep Kunathai (Unity); Jim McGoldrick (Ind)
Hume	National	Mick Veitch	Christine Ferguson (Nat); Alby Schultz* (Lib)	Greg Butler	Wayne Hickson	Jan Green	Dave Cox (Ind); Philip Fowler (Ind); Jean McClung (CEC)
Hunter	Labor	**Joel Fitzgibbon**	Rob Macaulay (Nat); Cherrilyn McLean (Lib)	Rod Bennison	Darren Culley	James Ryan	Terry Cook (SEP); Ann Lawler (CEC); Peter Meddows (AFP)
Kingsford-Smith	Labor	**Laurie Brereton**	Tio Faulkner (Lib)	Allan Caswell	Jack McEwen	Murray Matson	Vladimir Goryachev (Ind); Tatiana Haralambous (Unity)
Lindsay	Liberal	Cathy O'Toole	**Jackie Kelly** (Lib)	Stephen Lear	Rick Putra	Lesley Edwards	Sidney Acker (Unity); Dion Bailey (Ind); Jean Eykamp (CDP); Steve Grim-Reaper (Ind); F Ivor (Ind); David Lipman (Ind)
Lowe	Liberal	John Murphy	Robert Lee (Lib)	Jeff Meikle	John Wright	Natasha Verco	Owen Davies (CDP); Giancarlo Maisano (Ind); Vince Sicari (NAN); Gary Wilkinson (NLP); Chris Wong (Unity); **Paul Zammit** (Ind)
Lyne	National	Vicki Grieves	**Mark Vaile** (Nat)	Allan Quartly	Ray Danton	Carrie Jacobi	Graeme Muldoon (CEC); Terrence Simms (Ind); Barry Watts (CDP)
Macarthur	Liberal	Michael Banasik	**John Fahey** (Lib)	Anthony Kaufmann	Damian Alm	Michelle Wood	
Mackellar	Liberal	Nick Lorentzen	**Bronwyn Bishop** (Lib)	Vicki Dimond	John Webeck	Trevor Ockenden	Stephen Doric (NLP); Bob Ellis (Ind)
Macquarie	Liberal	Maggie Deahm	**Kerry Bartlett** (Lib)	Jon Rickard	Les Sheather	Adele Doust	Shirley Grigg (CTA); Michael Penny (NLP)
Mitchell	Liberal	Anthony Ellard	**Alan Cadman** (Lib)	Helen McAuliffe	Stephen Burke	Cindy Taylor	Ken Gregory (CDP); Michael Lyons (NLP); Ilo Uzonoski (Unity)
Newcastle (deferred)	Labor	**Allan Morris**	Clive Jensen (Lib)	Kaye Westbury [died]	Kate Taylor	Liz Rene	Greg Bludworth (CDP); Andrew Brown (Ind); Geoff Payne (DSL)
Newcastle (supplementary)	Labor	**Allan Morris**		Stephen Bisgrove	Kate Taylor	Carrie Jacobi	Peter Boyd (Ind); Greg Budworth (CDP); Harry Criticos (Ind); Tony King (CEC); Geoff Payne (DSL); Ivan Welsh (Ind); Harry Williams (PLP)
New England	National	Pat Dixon	Peter Monley (Lib); Stuart St. Clair* (Nat)	Rebekah Grindlay	Victor Weare	James Cronin	Frances Letters (NLP); David Morton (Ind); Graham Nuttall (Ind); Oriel Pearce (CDP)
North Sydney	Liberal	Julie Owens	**Joe Hockey** (Lib)	Anthony Spain	John Hockley	Andrew Woodroffe	Roger Bourne (CDP); Henry Pong (Unity); Glenn Russell (NLP)
Page	National	Joy Mathews	**Ian Causley** (Nat)	Peter Wrightson	Warren Wenban	Nicole Rogers	Doug Behn (Ind); Graham Clausen (CDP); Kath O'Driscoll (DSL)
Parkes	National	Barry Brebner	Tony Lawler* (Nat); Scott MacDougall (Lib)	David Burton	Donald McNaught		Robert Wilson (Ind)
Parramatta	Liberal	Paul Elliott	**Ross Cameron** (Lib)	Peter Mulligan	Ian Hale	Peter Wright	John Cogger (NLP); Peter Consandine (RPA); Dee Jonsson (CDP); Tina Schembri (Ind); Matthew Wong (Unity)
Paterson	Liberal	Bob Horne	**Bob Baldwin** (Lib)	Geoffrey Rutledge	Paul Fuller	Jan Davis	Andrew Buchan (Ind); Alison Dellit (DSL); Anthony King (CEC); Michelle Moffat (Ind); David Murray (CDP); Paul Unger (Ind)
Prospect	Labor	**Janice Crosio**	Nahid Aziz (Lib)	Manny Poularas	John Hutchinson	Chris Harris	Linda Cogger (NLP); Somchai Tongsumrith (Unity)
Reid	Labor	**Laurie Ferguson**	Alma Freame (Lib)	David Poularas	Shane O'Connor	Jamie Thompson	John Ananin (CDP); Rupen Savoulian (DSL); Penny Tongsumrith (Unity)
Richmond	National	Neville Newell	**Larry Anthony** (Nat)	Peter Cullen	John Penhaligon	Tom Tabart	Alan DeVendra (Ind); Helen Patterson (NLP); Leo Piek (Ind)
Riverina	National	Peter Hargreaves	Kay Hull* (Nat); David Kibbey (Lib)	Rosemary Gillies	David Barton		Denis Collins (Ind)
Robertson	Liberal	Belinda Neal	**Jim Lloyd** (Lib)	Andrew Penfold	Kevin Glancy	Ian McKenzie	Marie Ashburn (Unity)
Shortland	Labor	Jill Hall	Peter Craig (Lib)	Aysha Pollnitz	Ron Gardnir	Rebecca Moroney	Ivan Welsh (Ind)
Sydney	Labor	Tanya Plibersek	Bruce Morrow (Lib)	Ben Hanson	Warren Hensley	Jenny Ryde	Flavia Abdurahman (Unity); Denis Doherty (Ind); Michael Lippmann (NLP); Anna Lunsmann (NAN); Jenny Munro (Ind); John Percy (DSL)
Throsby	Labor	**Colin Hollis**	Charlie Mifsud (Lib)	Ann Barry	Dan Orr	Karla Sperling	Brian Hughes (CDP); Peter Stavropoulos (SEP)
Warringah	Liberal	Julie Heraghty	**Tony Abbott** (Lib)	Brett Paterson	Janne Lindrum	Keelah Lam	Tony Allen (ACS); Heath Johnstone (CDP); Ines Judd (NLP)
Watson	Labor	**Leo McLeay**	Joe Rafferty (Lib)	Amelia Gavagnin Newman	Claire Wright	Caroline Toomey	Zahir Abdurahman (Unity); Murray Peterson (CDP)
Wentworth	Liberal	Paul Pearce	**Andrew Thomson** (Lib)	Margaret Collings	Waverney Ford	Tom McLoughlin	Alan Jacobs (Unity); Dezi Koster (NLP)
Werriwa	Labor	**Mark Latham**	Andrew Thorn (Lib)	James Cockayne	John Hyslop	Vicki Kearney	Sharynne Freeman (Ind); Ibrahim Peck (Unity)

=== Northern Territory ===
Electorate	Held by	Labor candidate	CLP candidate	Democrats candidate	One Nation candidate	Greens candidate	Other candidates
Northern Territory	CLP	Warren Snowdon	**Nick Dondas**	Craig Seiler	Peter Schirmer	Ilana Eldridge	Barry Nattrass (Ind); Natalie Zirngast (DSL)

=== Queensland ===
Electorate	Held by	Labor candidate	Coalition candidate	Democrats candidate	One Nation candidate	Greens candidate	Other candidates
Blair	Liberal	Virginia Clarke	Cameron Thompson* (Lib); Brett White (Nat)	Neal McKenzie	**Pauline Hanson**	Libby Connors	Owen Bassingthwaighte (CEC); Lee Roberts (Ind); Mark Sloan (ACS)
Bowman	Liberal	Con Sciacca	**Andrea West** (Lib)	Jenny van Rooyen	Barry Myatt	Deeane Moorhead	
Brisbane	Labor	**Arch Bevis**	Marion Feros (Lib)	Darryl Holbrook	Samuel Tornatore	Brenda Mason	Graham Matthews (DSL); Duncan Spender (Ind)
Capricornia	National	Kirsten Livermore	**Paul Marek** (Nat)	Fay Lawrence	Len Timms	Joan Furness	Andrew Purvis (CEC); Peter Schuback (Ind)
Dawson	National	Mark Stroppiana	**De-Anne Kelly** (Nat)	Darin Preston	Barbara Eggers	Helen King	Kevin McLean (Ind)
Dickson	Liberal	Cheryl Kernot	Rod Henshaw (Lib)	Lis Manktelow	Bruce Camfield	Kim Pantano	Eddie Dunne (FLR); Robert Halliday (Ind); Mark Kelly (Ind); **Tony Smith** (Ind)
Fadden	Liberal	Mike Smith	**David Jull** (Lib)	Neil Cotter	Neil Pitt	Fay Smith	John McGuigan (CDP)
Fairfax	Liberal	John Henderson	Lindsay Horswood (Nat); **Alex Somlyay*** (Lib)	John Ryan	Fraser Anning	Peter Bakhash	Harry Cook (CDP); Mike Harper (Ind)
Fisher	Liberal	Ray O'Donnell	**Peter Slipper** (Lib)	Jenny Henman	Tim Jenkins	Les Shotton	Trevor Mumford (Ind); Alexander Taylor (Ind); Peter Urquhart (CDP)
Forde	Liberal	Peter Keech	**Kay Elson** (Lib)	Alan Dickson	Adrian Dean	Daniel Habermann	Geoff Daniels (FLR); Danny Hope (CEC)
Griffith	Liberal	Kevin Rudd	**Graeme McDougall** (Lib)	Iain Renton	Neil Jorgensen	Greg George	Jeni Eastwood (AWP)
Groom	Liberal	Geoff Brown	Bruce Green (Nat); Ian Macfarlane* (Lib)	Glenn Polson	Avril Baynes	Sarah Moles	Paul Harry (CDP); Cynthia Mayne (Ind)
Herbert	Liberal	Ted Lindsay	**Peter Lindsay** (Lib)	Althea Smith	Mark Swain	Rebecca Smith	Bob Bradley (Ind); John Edmiston (CDP); Elaine Steley (Ind); Pauline Woodbridge (AWP)
Hinkler	National	Cheryl Dorron	**Paul Neville** (Nat)	Lance Hall	Marcus Ringuet	Ray Pearce	Cindy Rolls (CEC)
Kennedy	National	Kenneth Stark	**Bob Katter** (Nat)	Alan Isherwood	Jayson Dalton	Ken Parker	Judy Harris (CEC); Greg Pohlmann (Ind); Steve Theodore (Ind)
Leichhardt	Liberal	Chris Lewis	**Warren Entsch** (Lib)	Harold Salier	Beth Hudson	Steven Nowakowski	Trudy Alberts (Ind); Steve Dimitriou (Ind); Rob Kenyon (Ind); Rata Hami Pugh (Ind)
Lilley	Liberal	Wayne Swan	**Elizabeth Grace** (Lib)	Kirsty Fraser	Warren Bray	Sue Meehan	Gerard O'Keeffe (CDP)
Longman	Liberal	Ian Burgett	**Mal Brough** (Lib)	Paul Barnes	Gavin Badke	John Langford	
McPherson	Liberal	Robert Poole	Margaret May* (Lib); Ted Shepherd (Nat)	Lynne Grimsey	Peter Murphy	John Palmer	Kevin Goodwin (Ind)
Maranoa	National	Elizabeth Pommer	**Bruce Scott** (Nat)	Regina Gleeson	Robyn Cadzow	Kim Olsen	Peter Miller (CEC); Lorraine Wheeldon (Ind)
Moncrieff	Liberal	Anne Bennett	**Kathy Sullivan** (Lib)	Colin O'Brien	Warren Fenton	Sally Spain	Julie Falcke (CDP)
Moreton	Liberal	Kathleen Brookes	**Gary Hardgrave** (Lib)	Anthony Lee	Vanessa Stewart	Lenore Taylor	Jim Vote (CDP)
Oxley	Labor	Bernie Ripoll	Maria Forbes (Lib)	Kate Kunzelmann	Colene Hughes	John McKeon	Xuan Thu Nguyen (Ind); Dele Rule (Ind); Anne Scott (Ind); Simon Trencher (FLR)
Petrie	Liberal	Rosemary Hume	**Teresa Gambaro** (Lib)	Pamela Stowell	Raymond Bower	Peter Burgoyne	
Rankin	Labor	Craig Emerson	Cuong Bui (Lib)	Robert Hernandez	Ron Frood	Sara van Tinteren	Lorraine Barnes (Ind); Ann Hage (CDP); Brian Norton (Ind)
Ryan	Liberal	Teresa Farruggio	**John Moore** (Lib)	Lyn Dengate	Alan Smith	Brian Hoepper	John Barker (AFP); Peter Mackenzie (Ind); Alan Skyring (Ind)
Wide Bay	National	Russ Tremlin	Desley Fraser (Lib); **Warren Truss*** (Nat)	Phil Rodhouse	Graeme Wicks	Richard Nielsen	Bob Postle (Ind)

=== South Australia ===
Electorate	Held by	Labor candidate	Liberal candidate	Democrats candidate	One Nation candidate	Other candidates
Adelaide	Liberal	Karen Hannon	**Trish Worth**	Tyron Beard	Suzanne Ramsey	Rita Hunt (Ind); Vladimir Lorenzon (NLP); Mark Moran (Grn)
Barker	Liberal	David Detchon	Patrick Secker	John Lavers	Dona Wright	Tony Beck (Ind); Philip Cornish (CDP); Tom Haig (Nat); Bill Jerram (Ind); Judith Ludwig (AFP)
Bonython	Labor	**Martyn Evans**	Phil Newton	Robert Fisher	Ted Shaw	Dave Carter (AFP)
Boothby	Liberal	Jo Chesson	**Andrew Southcott**	Don Gilbert	Trevor Whittaker	Bevan Morris (NLP)
Grey	Liberal	Geoff Buckland	**Barry Wakelin**	Nick Weetman	Noel Dickson	Paul Brown (NLP); Ian Gray (Nat); Martin Jackson (Ind)
Hindmarsh	Liberal	Steve Georganas	**Chris Gallus**	Neil Raw	Colin Gibson	Deb Cashel (Grn); Sandra Dunning (NLP)
Kingston	Liberal	David Cox	**Susan Jeanes**	Graham Pratt	Charlie McCormack	Hugh Dickson (NLP); Ralph Hahnheuser (Ind); Chris Planeta (EFF); Olive Weston (Ind)
Makin	Liberal	Gail Gago	**Trish Draper**	Christine Posta	Rodney Kowald	Geoffrey Wells (NLP); Mike Wohltmann (Ind)
Mayo	Liberal	Jade Evans	**Alexander Downer**	John Schumann	Lee Peacock	Anthony Coombe (NLP); Howie Coombe (Ind); Ian Wynn (CDP)
Port Adelaide	Labor	**Rod Sawford**	Romeo Cavuoto	Matilda Bawden	John Powell	Rick Hill (Ind); Michael Perth (Ind)
Sturt	Liberal	Lance Worrall	**Christopher Pyne**	Jackie Dearing	Paul Sissons	Michal Kinasz (Ind); Lyndal Vincent (NLP)
Wakefield	Liberal	Carla Leversedge	**Neil Andrew**	Karrie Lannstrom	Merv Hartwig	Jeremy Challacombe (Nat); Pam Kelly (Ind)

=== Tasmania ===
Electorate	Held by	Labor candidate	Liberal candidate	Greens candidate	One Nation candidate	Democrats candidate	Other candidates
Bass	Liberal	Michelle O'Byrne	**Warwick Smith**	Stuart Baird	Allan Lockhart	Brian Muir	Harvey Smith (TFP)
Braddon	Liberal	Sid Sidebottom	**Chris Miles**	Clare Thompson	John Thomson	Peter Morgan	Gavin Thompson (TFP)
Denison	Labor	**Duncan Kerr**	Andrew Gregson	Mat Hines		Brent Blackburn	Gregory Broszczyk (NLP)
Franklin	Labor	**Harry Quick**	Jane Goodluck	Kay McFarlane		Irene Fisher	
Lyons	Labor	**Dick Adams**	Richard Colbeck	Annie Willock	Andrew Wilson	Bob Bensemann	Darryl Gerrity (TFP)

=== Victoria ===
Electorate	Held by	Labor candidate	Coalition candidate	Democrats candidate	One Nation candidate	Greens candidate	Other candidates
Aston	Liberal	Peter Lockwood	**Peter Nugent** (Lib)	Darrell Stosegan	Ian Cameron		Guosheng Chen (Unity); Paul Rigoni (ARP)
Ballarat	Liberal	Marg Card	**Michael Ronaldson** (Lib)	Peta Price	John Blanchard	Malcolm Campbell	Frank Colosimo (CDP); Alex Graham (Ind); Ian Harrison (Ind); Margaret Taylor (Unity); John Wiley (ASP)
Batman	Labor	**Martin Ferguson**	Lauri Rowe (Lib)	Marc Nicholls		Helen Rosenbaum	Wayne Barwick (CEC); Sami Mazloum (Unity); Martin Richardson (NLP); Matt Wilson (Ind)
Bendigo	Liberal	Steve Gibbons	Scott Mitchell (Nat); Max Turner (Lib)	Alan Tilley	Karel Zegers	David Jones	Peter Biggs (AFP); Alan McDonald (NLP); Gayle Maddigan (Unity); Peter Morley (Ind); Lyn Speirs (CEC); Alfred Thorpe (ARP)
Bruce	Labor	**Alan Griffin**	Jim Wood (Lib)	Adam McBeth	Laurence Lowe	Colin Smith	Dikran Chabdjian (ACS); Toan Huynh (Unity); Michael Soos (NLP)
Burke	Labor	**Neil O'Keefe**	Serge Petrovich (Lib)	Vaughan Williams	Frank Preston	Paul Fyffe	Rod Hardy (Ind); Ngaire Mason (NLP)
Calwell	Labor	**Andrew Theophanous**	Trevor Blake (Lib)	Robert Livesay			Michael Harris (NLP); Benal Keceli (Unity)
Casey	Liberal	Frank Armenio	**Michael Wooldridge** (Lib)	John McLaren	Stephen Beck	Chris James	Robert Kendi (NLP); John Mackellar (Ind); Steve Raskovy (Ind); Gary Smart (Unity); Basil Smidt (CDP); Judy Warwick (ASP)
Chisholm	Liberal	Anna Burke	Peter Vlahos (Lib)	Bernie Millane	Douglas Hesse	Julian Guess	Ka-Sing Chua (Unity); Nicholas Fell (RPA); Mark Toomey (NLP)
Corangamite	Liberal	Michael Bjork-Billings	**Stewart McArthur** (Lib)	Jeffrey Paull	Duncan Maclean	Adrian Whitehead	Simon Arundell (Ind); Robert Harwood (Unity)
Corio	Labor	**Gavan O'Connor**	Dennis Jensen (Lib)	Andre Czausov	Robert Grant		Michael Garbutcheon Singh (Unity); Therese Self (PLP)
Deakin	Liberal	Peter Bertolus	**Phil Barresi** (Lib)	John Siddons	Paul Coelli	Robyn Evans	Linda Keath (NLP); Tim Petherbridge (Ind); Geoffrey Teng (Unity)
Dunkley	Liberal	Michael Quayle	**Bruce Billson** (Lib)	Tony Seals	Robyn Brown	Henry Kelsall	Jan Chapman Davis (Unity); Ben Mason (NLP)
Flinders	Liberal	John Armitage	**Peter Reith** (Lib)	David Allison	Robert Langley	Mervyn Vogt	Jan Charlwood (NLP); Tony Kamps (Unity)
Gellibrand	Labor	Nicola Roxon	Anthony Cursio (Lib)	David Wark	Nikolas Kavalenka	Liz Ingham	Michael Pollock (NLP); Adrian Shorland (Unity)
Gippsland	National	Judith Stone	**Peter McGauran** (Nat)	Jo McCubbin	Tony Peters		Leonie Cameron (Ind); Frances Clarke (NLP); Les Horsfield (Ind); Robert Thorpe (Unity); Doug Treasure (Ind); Jack Vanderland (Ind); John Weatherhead (AFP)
Goldstein	Liberal	Margaret Khouri	**David Kemp** (Lib)	Diane Barry	Peter Crawford	Nick Brunton	Joan Dickins (NLP); Meret Field (ACS); Arkady Shtrambrandt (Unity)
Higgins	Liberal	Jude Wallace	**Peter Costello** (Lib)	Craig Shaw	Rod Spencer	Robert Trafficante	Michael Dickins (NLP); Russell Dwyer (Ind); Ian Lawson (Ind); President Torney (ACS); David Zyngier (Unity)
Holt	Labor	**Gareth Evans**	Margaret Nicholls (Lib)	Daniel Berk			Heath Allison (NLP); Robert Bisset (Ind); Lynne Dickson (CDP); Kunwar Raj Singh (Unity)
Hotham	Labor	**Simon Crean**	John Pesutto (Lib)	Polly Morgan	Alan Salter	Susan Walters	John Cordon (NLP); Stan Rosenthal (Unity)
Indi	Liberal	Zuvele Leschen	**Lou Lieberman** (Lib)	Kevin Smith	John Anderson	Tim Bardsley	Susan Griffith (NLP); David Maroney (Ind); Jurek Paz (Ind); Brian Robson (AFP); Norm Ryan (Ind)
Isaacs	Labor	**Greg Wilton**	Mike Rawlinson (Lib)	Robert Ryan	Denis Reed-Smith	Daniel Tirawa	Patricia Brook (AFP); Mija Carkeek (Unity); Amanda McIntosh (NLP)
Jagajaga	Labor	**Jenny Macklin**	Tony Raunic (Lib)	John McPherson	Ray Mason	Robyn Roberts	Steve Griffith (NLP); Grant Walters (Unity)
Kooyong	Liberal	Maxine Morand	**Petro Georgiou** (Lib)	Brad Starkie	Ron McKean	Wendy Salter	Milton Nomikoudis (Unity)
Lalor	Labor	Julia Gillard	Cameron O'Sullivan (Lib)	Anthony Shaw	John Brodel	Cynthia Manson	George Papaellinas (Unity)
La Trobe	Liberal	Carolyn Hirsh	**Bob Charles** (Lib)	Amanda Leeper	Jeff Thomas	Robyn Holtham	Frank Dean (Ind); Assyl Haidar (Unity); Andrew Stenberg (NLP); Wolf Voigt (CDP); Graham Woolley (ACS)
McEwen	Liberal	Graeme McEwen	**Fran Bailey** (Lib)	Sean Carter	Dennis Lacey	Pam Lawson	Stephen Bowden (Ind); Susan Brown (NLP); Elizabeth Savage Kooroonya (Ind); Vicki Treble (ASP)
McMillan	Liberal	Christian Zahra	**Russell Broadbent** (Lib)	David Wall	Bryan Atkin	Jenny Farrar	Barry Cunningham (Ind); Anthony Geoghegan (Ind); Peter Jackson (NLP); Peter Kelly (ASP); Colin Milne (Unity); Peter Wells (AFP)
Mallee	National	John Zigouras	**John Forrest** (Nat)	Tom Joyce	Bill Croft		Lee Cubit (CEC); Lionel McKenzie (Ind)
Maribyrnong	Labor	**Bob Sercombe**	Will Charlton (Lib)	Helen Martin		Tony Camilleri	Paul Gallagher (CEC); Diana Kalantzis (Unity); Paul Treacy (NLP)
Melbourne	Labor	**Lindsay Tanner** (Lib)	Paul Nettelbeck (Lib)	Brent McKenna		Nolan Tyrrell	Lawrence Clarke (NLP); James Ferrari (Ind); Ivan Horvat (CEC); Sherridan Maxwell (Unity); Maurice Sibelle (DSL)
Melbourne Ports	Labor	Michael Danby	Fiona Snedden (Lib)	Julie Peters	Arthur Hawley	Dinesh Mathew	Tom Haynes (NLP); Diana Wolowski (Unity)
Menzies	Liberal	Peter Allan	**Kevin Andrews** (Lib)	Damian Wise	John Casley		Mark Bunn (NLP); Mohamed Morsy (Unity); Philip Nitschke (Ind); Marcia Riordan (Ind)
Murray	Liberal	John Stuart	**Sharman Stone** (Lib)	Ray Cadmore	Robert Hellemons	Eleisha Mullane	Nino Marcucci (Ind); Diane Teasdale (AFP); Geoff Wilson (ASP)
Scullin	Labor	**Harry Jenkins**	Peter Pratt (Lib)	Hussein Tahiri			Robert Brown (NLP); M. Kheirallah (Unity)
Wannon	Liberal	Mia Vitue	**David Hawker** (Lib)	Maggie Lindop	Simon Edge		Leigh McDonald (ARP); Robert O'Brien (Ind)
Wills	Labor	**Kelvin Thomson**	David Curry (Lib)	Robert Stone			Randa Abdel-Fattah (Unity); Bill Deller (PLP); Andrew Fox (CEC)

=== Western Australia ===
Electorate	Held by	Labor candidate	Liberal candidate	Democrats candidate	One Nation candidate	Greens candidate	Other candidates
Brand	Labor	**Kim Beazley**	Rick Palmer	Collin Mullane	Lee Dawson	Nick Dunlop	Kate Dorrington (Ind); Carolyn Gent (AFP); Ron Higgins (ACS); Graham Lawn (CDP); Anne Leishman (NLP); Kent Reynolds (Ind); Paul Roth (Ind)
Canning	Liberal	Jane Gerick	**Ricky Johnston**	Dean Craig	Colin Taylor	Margo Beilby	Brian McCarthy (CEC); Patti Roberts (NLP); Lance Scott (Ind); Michelle Shave (CDP)
Cowan	Liberal	Graham Edwards	**Richard Evans**	Craig Wakeford	Ron Holt	Miguel Castillo	Phillip Hayes (CDP)
Curtin	Independent	Andrew Waddell	Julie Bishop	Stephen Lipple	Ian Trinder	Phillip Farren	**Allan Rocher** (Ind)
Forrest	Liberal	Tony Dean	**Geoff Prosser**	Alf Denman	Paddy Embry	Paul Llewellyn	Jim Cummins (CDP); Jon Doust (Ind); Ted Stone (AFP); Steve Thomas (Nat); John Watson (CEC)
Fremantle	Labor	**Carmen Lawrence**	Mick Tiller	Jakica Zaknic	Tony Hill	Leonie Deegan	Lawrence Shave (Ind)
Kalgoorlie	Independent	Clark Butson	Barry Haase	Dean Richter	Neville Smith	Robin Chapple	Ian Burt (CEC); **Graeme Campbell** (AFP); Kathy Finlayson (Nat); Laurie Sugg (CDP)
Moore	Independent	Christine Power	Mal Washer	Patti Lock	Allison Walker	Steve Magyar	**Paul Filing** (Ind)
O'Connor	Liberal	Frank Marciano	**Wilson Tuckey**	Hannah McGlade	Frank Hough	Mark Douglas	Mac Forsyth (CDP); Jenny Fowler (Nat); Stuart Smith (CEC); Ian Stiles (AFP)
Pearce	Liberal	Paul Andrews	**Judi Moylan**	Barbara Moxham	David Gunnyon	Keith Schekkerman	John Burt (CEC); Roger Cooper (Nat)
Perth	Labor	**Stephen Smith**	David Montani	Brendon Entrekin	Kerry Mills	Gemma Carter	Kim Iggy (DSL)
Stirling	Liberal	Jann McFarlane	**Eoin Cameron**	Peter Markham	John Evans	Mark Lockett	Leanne Hillel (NLP); Elaine McNeill (AFP); Bronislaw Tabaczynski (Unity)
Swan	Liberal	Kim Wilkie	**Don Randall**	Tim Fraser	Richard Birchall	Juanita Miller	Elspeth Clairs (NLP); Brett Crook (CDP); Malcolm Talbot (CEC)
Tangney	Liberal	Martin Whitely	**Daryl Williams**	Geoff Taylor	Raymond O'Dwyer	Joshua Byrne	Suryan Chandrasegaran (CDP); Manny Goldberg (ACS)

== Senate ==
Sitting Senators are shown in bold text. Tickets that elected at least one Senator are highlighted in the relevant colour. Successful candidates are identified by an asterisk (*).

=== Australian Capital Territory ===
Two seats were up for election. The Labor Party was defending one seat. The Liberal Party was defending one seat.

Labor candidates	Liberal candidates	Democrats candidates	One Nation candidates
1. **Kate Lundy***; 2. Peter Conway	1. **Margaret Reid***; 2. Gayle Richards	1. Rick Farley; 2. Wayne Sievers	1. Estelle O'Brien; 2. Jeremy Leyland
Greens candidates	Women's candidates	ACS candidates	Ungrouped candidates
1. Deb Foskey; 2. Lesley Christian	1. Annette Haridan; 2. Susanne Edwards	1. Peter Rogers; 2. Anthony Hardy	Cec Harris (Ind); Andrew Edgar (Ind); John Miller (CDP)

=== New South Wales ===
Six seats were up for election. The Labor Party was defending three seats. The Liberal-National Coalition was defending three seats. Senators Vicki Bourne (Democrats), George Campbell (Labor), David Brownhill (National), Helen Coonan (Liberal), Marise Payne (Liberal) and Sue West (Labor) were not up for re-election.

Labor candidates	Coalition candidates	Democrats candidates	One Nation candidates	Greens candidates
1. Steve Hutchins*; 2. **John Faulkner***; 3. **Michael Forshaw***; 4. Ursula Stephens	1. **Bill Heffernan*** (Lib); 2. **John Tierney*** (Lib); 3. **Sandy Macdonald** (Nat); 4. Concetta Fierravanti-Wells (Lib)	1. Aden Ridgeway*; 2. Matthew Baird; 3. Suzanne Reddy; 4. David Mendelssohn	1. David Oldfield; 2. Brian Burston; 3. Bevan O'Regan	1. John Sutton; 2. Catherine Moore; 3. Lee Rhiannon; 4. Susie Russell
CDP candidates	Unity candidates	NDP candidates	NAN candidates	AFP candidates
1. Graham McLennan; 2. Janne Peterson; 3. Tom Allanson; 4. Rex Morgan; 5. Michael McLennan	1. Jason Yat-Sen Li; 2. Sonja Stockreiter; 3. Sam McGuid; 4. Kieran Ginges; 5. Nicholas Hassapis	1. Michael Denborough; 2. Yvonne Francis	1. Chris Nash; 2. Jane Waddell	1. Victor Shen; 2. Greg Willson
NLP candidates	ACS candidates	CEC candidates	DSL candidates	RARI candidates
1. Richard Nolan; 2. Bev Seymour	1. Justice Abolish; 2. Richard Mezinec	1. Robert Butler; 2. Glenys Collins; 3. Lindsay Cosgrove	1. Marina Carman; 2. Peter Boyle	1. Rodney Smith; 2. Edwin Woodger
SEP candidates	Group D candidates	Group G candidates	Group J candidates	Group P candidates
1. Nick Beams; 2. Carol Divjak	1. Mick Gallagher; 2. John Mawson	1. Malcolm Lees; 2. Warwick Rankin	1. David Mouldfield; 2. Paul-Ian Handsome	1. Patricia Poulos; 2. John Holley
Group R candidates	Group S candidates	Ungrouped candidates		
1. Robert Schollbach; 2. Amanda Stirling	1. Graeme Melville; 2. Philip Broadbridge	Mehmet Yaglipinar; Paul Sarks; Adrian Vaughan	Pauline Pantsdown; Tom Kumar; Richard Ross	Stani Joseph; Party Parslow; Ron Poulsen

=== Northern Territory ===
Two seats were up for election. The Labor Party was defending one seat. The Country Liberal Party was defending one seat.

Labor candidates	CLP candidates	Democrats candidates	One Nation candidates	Greens candidates	Ungrouped candidates
1. **Trish Crossin***; 2. Charlie Phillips	1. **Grant Tambling***; 2. Maisie Austin	1. Victor Edwards; 2. Peter Clements	1. Ted Hagger; 2. Dee Mills	1. Lex Martin; 2. Andy Gough	Jonathan Polke

=== Queensland ===
Six seats were up for election. The Labor Party was defending two seats. The Liberal Party was defending two seats. The National Party was defending one seat. The Australian Democrats were defending one seat. Senators Andrew Bartlett (Democrats), Ron Boswell (National), Brenda Gibbs (Labor), John Herron (Liberal), John Hogg (Labor) and Ian Macdonald (Liberal) were not up for re-election.

Labor candidates	Liberal candidates	National candidates	Democrats candidates	One Nation candidates
1. Jan McLucas*; 2. Joe Ludwig*; 3. Jann Piasecki	1. **Warwick Parer***; 2. Brett Mason*; 3. **David MacGibbon**; 4. Deborah Kember	1. **Bill O'Chee**; 2. Thomas Bradley; 3. Teresa Cobb	1. **John Woodley***; 2. John Cherry; 3. Megan Bathurst	1. Heather Hill*; 2. Len Harris; 3. Sue Gordon; 4. David Anning; 5. Barry Evans
Greens candidates	CDP candidates	Unity candidates	CEC candidates	AFP candidates
1. Drew Hutton; 2. Desiree Mahoney; 3. Chris Gwin	1. John Bradford; 2. Kerry Blackman; 3. Judy MacKenzie	1. Henry Fong; 2. Chris Toogood	1. Maurice Hetherington; 2. Ray Gillham	1. Eric Nagle; 2. Klaus Duke
Queensland First candidates	FLR candidates	OAP candidates	NLP candidates	Reform candidates
1. David Colston; 2. Dawn Colston	1. Barry Weedon; 2. Robyn Somers	1. Mario Zocchi; 2. Ray Buckley	1. Geoff Wilson; 2. Dorothy McKenzie	1. Brenda Moloney; 2. Terry Fleming
ACS candidates	Women's candidates	DSL candidates	Group B candidates	Group C candidates
1. Bruce The Family; 2. Steve Southall	1. Mary Kelly; 2. Jenny Hughey	1. Andy Gianniotis; 2. Coral Wynter	1. Jan Linsley; 2. Percy Meredith	1. Noel Payne; 2. Jim Pavier
Group S candidates	Ungrouped candidates			
1. Selwyn Johnston; 2. Aaron Johnston	Michele MacNevin; Terry Sharples; Kenny Dalton; Doug Hodgetts; Bryan Peach			

=== South Australia ===
Six seats were up for election. The Labor Party was defending two seats. The Liberal Party was defending three seats. The Australian Democrats were defending one seat. Senators Grant Chapman (Liberal), Rosemary Crowley (Labor), Jeannie Ferris (Liberal), Robert Hill (Liberal), Chris Schacht (Labor) and Natasha Stott Despoja (Democrats) were not up for re-election.

Labor candidates	Liberal candidates	Democrats candidates	One Nation candidates	Greens candidates
1. **Nick Bolkus***; 2. **John Quirke***; 3. Bill Hender	1. **Amanda Vanstone***; 2. **Nick Minchin***; 3. **Alan Ferguson***; 4. Joy de Leo	1. **Meg Lees***; 2. Michael Pilling; 3. Alex Bowie; 4. Natalija Apponyi	1. Len Spencer; 2. Malcolm Rumbelow; 3. Monica Reimann	1. Craig Wilkins; 2. Michelle Drummond
National candidates	CDP candidates	AFP candidates	CEC candidates	DSL candidates
1. Ellis Wayland; 2. Robin Dixon-Thompson	1. Bob Randall; 2. Colin Sinclair	1. Peter Davis; 2. Bill Fradd	1. Tommy Tonkin; 2. Pompeo Feleppa	1. Melanie Sjoberg; 2. Kathy Newman
Group D candidates	Group E candidates	Group L candidates	Ungrouped candidates	
1. Lindsay Simmons; 2. Pat Brown	1. Chris Harms; 2. Kirsti Harms	1. Bernice Pfitzner-Eu; 2. Erik Eriksen; 3. Sean Heylen	Neil Russell-Taylor; Graham Neave	

=== Tasmania ===
Six seats were up for election. The Labor Party was defending three seats. The Liberal Party was defending two seats. Independent Senator Brian Harradine was defending one seat. Senators Bob Brown (Greens), Paul Calvert (Liberal), Sue Mackay (Labor), Jocelyn Newman (Liberal), Nick Sherry (Labor) and John Watson (Liberal) were not up for re-election.

Labor candidates	Liberal candidates	Harradine candidates	Greens candidates	Democrats candidates
1. **Kerry O'Brien***; 2. **Shayne Murphy***; 3. **Kay Denman***	1. **Eric Abetz***; 2. **Brian Gibson***; 3. Guy Barnett; 4. Peter Collenette	1. **Brian Harradine***	1. Louise Crossley; 2. Simon Baptist	1. Robert Bell; 2. Debbie Butler; 3. Chris Ivory
One Nation candidates	CDP candidates	TFP candidates	Women's candidates	Republican candidates
1. Peter Stokes; 2. Michael Cartwright; 3. Leigh Spicer	1. Don Rogers; 2. Beryl Rogers	1. David Pickford; 2. David Jackson; 3. Petita Abblitt	1. Lin MacQueen; 2. Carolyn Bindon	1. Jenny Sheridan; 2. Rena Dare
ACS candidates	DSL candidates	Ungrouped candidates		
1. Ian Hickman; 2. Fred Lombardi	1. Kamala Emanuel; 2. Ian Jamieson	Norma Jamieson; Laurie Heathorn; Steven Suli		

=== Victoria ===
Six seats were up for election. The Labor Party was defending three seats. The Liberal-National Coalition was defending three seats. Senators Lyn Allison (Democrats), Richard Alston (Liberal), Barney Cooney (Labor), Rod Kemp (Liberal), Kay Patterson (Liberal) and Robert Ray (Labor) were not up for re-election.

Labor candidates	Coalition candidates	Democrats candidates	One Nation candidates	Greens candidates
1. **Stephen Conroy***; 2. **Kim Carr***; 3. **Jacinta Collins***; 4. Wendy Boyle	1. **Judith Troeth*** (Lib); 2. **Julian McGauran*** (Nat); 3. Tsebin Tchen* (Lib); 4. **Karen Synon** (Lib); 5. Dino de Marchi (Lib); 6. Anna MacGowan (Lib)	1. Jim Downey; 2. Matthew Townsend; 3. Ken Saunders; 4. Alison Harcourt	1. Robyn Spencer; 2. Ben Buckley	1. Charmaine Clarke; 2. David Risstrom; 3. Liz Conor
DLP candidates	CDP candidates	Unity candidates	NDP candidates	AFP candidates
1. John Mulholland; 2. Pat Crea	1. Murray Graham; 2. Ken Cook	1. Bill Cope; 2. Phong Nguyen; 3. Wellington Lee; 4. Ricci Swart; 5. Markham Rose; 6. Vivien Cerolini; 7. Naji Imam; 8. Mary Kalantzis	1. Gareth Smith; 2. Jacob Grech	1. Denis McCormack; 2. Colin Godfrey
ABR candidates	SEP candidates	Reform candidates	Women's candidates	ACS/FLR candidates
1. Eric Bullmore; 2. David Sydenham	1. Sue Phillips; 2. Will Marshall	1. Ray Mathieson; 2. Ted Drane	1. Deb Nicholson; 2. Pat O'Brien	1. Abboud Haidar (ACS); 2. John Abbotto (FLR)
NLP candidates	Shooters candidates	DSL candidates	CEC candidates	Group B candidates
1. Byron Rigby; 2. Raymond Schlager; 3. Lorna Scurfield	1. Graham Eames; 2. Neville Sayers; 3. Alan Hutchison; 4. Graeme Forbes	1. Jo Williams; 2. Vannessa Hearman	1. Craig Isherwood; 2. Robert Barwick	1. Joe Toscano; 2. Steve Roper
Ungrouped candidates				
Cecil G. Murgatroyd; M. H. Pech; Graham Smith; David Heffron; Malcolm McClure				

=== Western Australia ===
Six seats were up for election. The Labor Party was defending two seats. The Liberal Party was defending three seats. The Greens WA were defending one seat. Senators Mark Bishop (Labor), Winston Crane (Liberal), Alan Eggleston (Liberal), Ross Lightfoot (Liberal), Jim McKiernan (Labor) and Andrew Murray (Democrats) were not up for re-election.

Labor candidates	Liberal candidates	Greens WA candidates	One Nation candidates	Democrats candidates
1. **Peter Cook***; 2. **Chris Evans***; 3. Rhonda Griffiths; 4. Sue Ellery; 5. Lois Anderson; 6. Chilip Foo	1. **Chris Ellison***; 2. **Ian Campbell***; 3. **Sue Knowles***; 4. Ivan Ivankovic	1. **Dee Margetts**; 2. Kayt Davies; 3. Alison Xamon	1. John Fischer; 2. Colin Tincknell; 3. Martin Suter	1. Brian Greig*; 2. Stephen Crabbe; 3. Margot Clifford
National candidates	CDP candidates	Shooters candidates	NLP candidates	Unity candidates
1. Beryle Morgan; 2. Dudley Maslen	1. Justin Moseley; 2. Peter Johnson	1. Raymond Motteram; 2. Ken Taylor	1. George Kailis; 2. Cathryn D'Cruz	1. Ted Wilkes; 2. Mai-Yie Leung; 3. Michael Carey
TPS candidates	ACS candidates	CEC candidates	DSL candidates	Republican candidates
1. Alan Bateson; 2. Rick Finney	1. Brendan Griffin; 2. Sam Johnson	1. Tony Drake; 2. Jean Robinson	1. Sarah Stephen; 2. Roberto Jorquera	1. Michael O'Donnell; 2. Kerry McNally
Group N candidates	Group O candidates	Ungrouped candidates		
1. Kate Hobbs; 2. Morris Bessant	1. Joan Torr; 2. Roger Pratt	Rod Garcia		

== Summary by party ==
Beside each party is the number of seats contested by that party in the House of Representatives for each state, as well as an indication of whether the party contested the Senate election in the respective state.

Party	NSW		Vic		Qld		WA		SA		Tas		ACT		NT		Total	
Party	HR	S	HR	S	HR	S	HR	S	HR	S	HR	S	HR	S	HR	S	HR	S
Australian Labor Party	50	*	37	*	27	*	14	*	12	*	5	*	2	*	1	*	148	8
Liberal Party of Australia	42	*	35	*	22	*	14	*	12	*	5	*	2	*			132	7
National Party of Australia	12	*	3	*	10	*	4	*	3	*							32	5
Country Liberal Party															1	*	1	1
Australian Democrats	50	*	37	*	27	*	14	*	12	*	5	*	2	*	1	*	148	8
One Nation	50	*	30	*	27	*	14	*	12	*	3	*	2	*	1	*	139	8
Australian Greens	45	*	27	*	27	*			2	*	5	*	2	*	1	*	109	7
Natural Law Party	16	*	27	*		*	4	*	8		1		2				58	4
Unity Party	25	*	31	*		*	1	*									57	4
Christian Democratic Party	28	*	4	*	9	*	8	*	2	*		*		*			51	7
Citizens Electoral Council	7	*	6	*	6	*	6	*		*							25	5
Australia First Party	2	*	6	*	1	*	5		2	*							16	4
Greens Western Australia							14	*									14	1
Democratic Socialist Electoral League	7	*	1	*	1	*	1	*		*		*	2		1		13	6
Abolish Child Support	4	*	4	*	1	*	2	*				*		*			11	6
Australian Shooters Party			5	*				*									5	2
No Aircraft Noise	4	*															4	1
Republican Party of Australia	2		1					*				*					3	2
Family Law Reform Party				*	3	*											3	2
Australian Reform Party			3	*		*											3	2
Tasmania First Party											3	*					3	1
Australian Women's Party				*	2	*						*		*			2	4
Socialist Equality Party	2	*		*													2	2
Progressive Labour Party			2														2	
Independent EFF									1								1	
Nuclear Disarmament Party		*		*														2
Reclaim Australia: Reduce Immigration		*																1
Democratic Labor Party				*														1
Australian Bill of Rights Group				*														1
Queensland First						*												1
One Australia Party						*												1
Taxi Operators Political Service								*										1
Brian Harradine Group												*						1
Independent and other	41		30		29		8		12				1		1		122	

Candidates for the Newcastle supplementary election are not counted, although the original Newcastle candidates are.

== See also ==
- 1998 Australian federal election
- Members of the Australian House of Representatives, 1996–1998
- Members of the Australian House of Representatives, 1998–2001
- Members of the Australian Senate, 1996–1999
- Members of the Australian Senate, 1999–2002
- List of political parties in Australia
