= 1998 Australian Senate election =

Australian federal election results

1998 Australian Senate elections
- 3 October 1998

40 of the 76 seats in the Australian Senate 39 seats needed for a majority
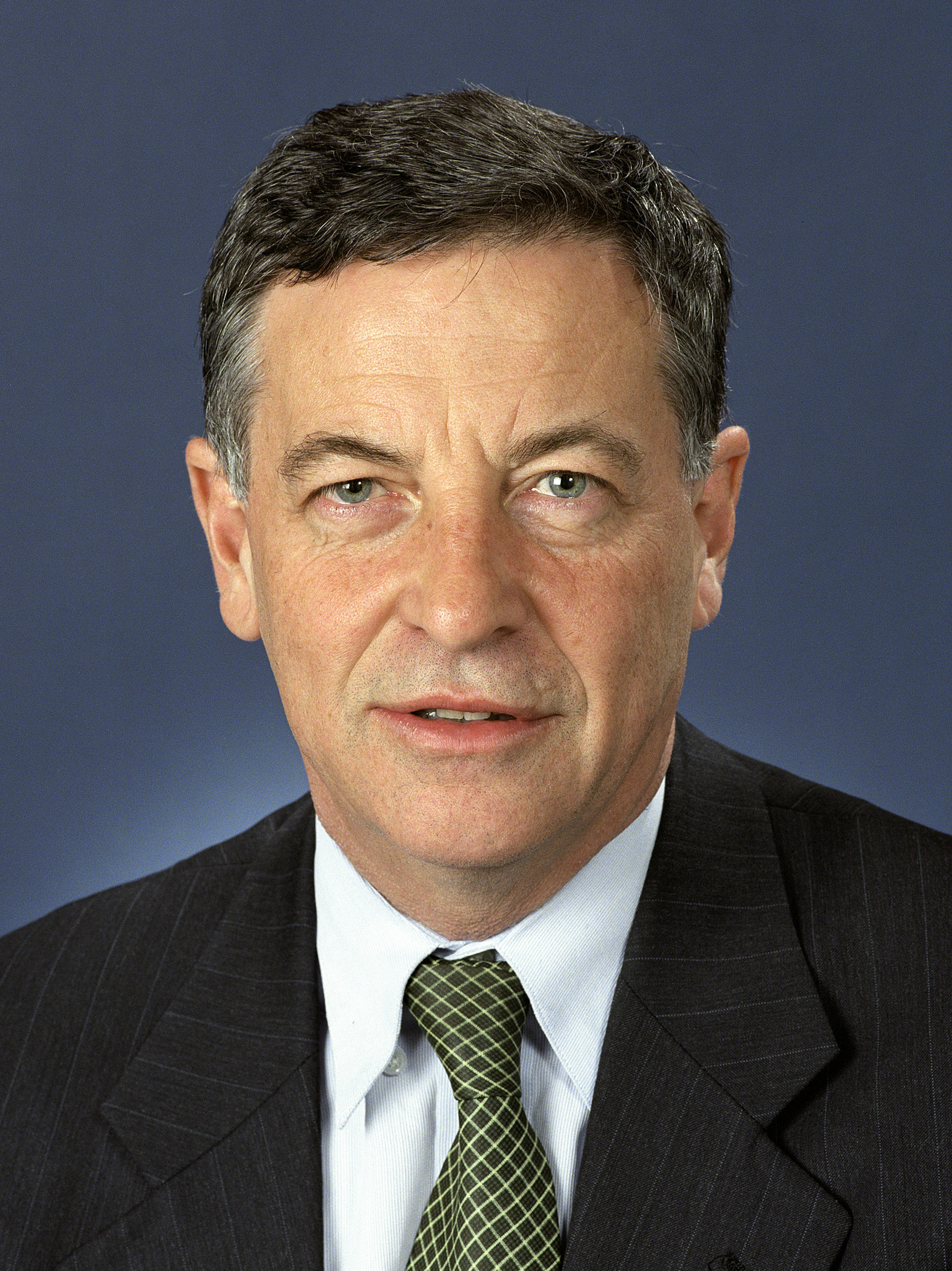

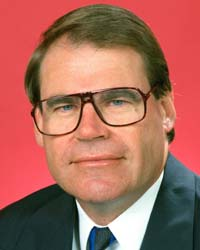

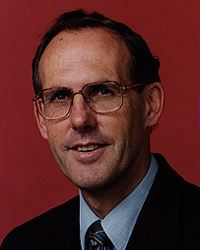

	First party	Second party	Third party
			DEM
Leader	Robert Hill	John Faulkner	Meg Lees
Party	Liberal–National Coalition	Labor	Democrats
Leader since	3 April 1990	19 March 1996	15 October 1997
Leader's seat	South Australia	New South Wales	South Australia
Seats before	37	29	7
Seats after	34	29	9
Seat change	▼3	0	▲2
Popular vote	4,189,673	4,182,963	947,940
Percentage	37.36%	37.31%	8.45%
Swing	▼6.24%	▲1.16%	▼2.37%
	Fourth party	Fifth party	Sixth party
	PHON
Leader	Heather Hill	Bob Brown (Note: De facto, see Leader of the Australian Greens)	Brian Harradine
Party	One Nation	Australian Greens	Harradine Group
Leader's seat	Queensland	Tasmania	None
Seats before	0	1	1
Seats won	1	0	1
Seats after	1	1	1
Seat change	▲1	Steady	Steady
Popular vote	1,007,439	305,058	24,254
Percentage	8.99%	2.72%	0.22%
Swing	▲8.99%	▼0.45%	▼0.08%
- Senators elected in the 1998 federal election
Leader of the Senate before election
Robert Hill
Liberal/National coalition
Elected Leader of the Senate
Robert Hill
Liberal/National coalition

The following tables show state-by-state results in the Australian Senate at the 1998 federal election. Senators total 34 coalition (31 Liberal, two coalition National, one CLP), 29 Labor, one Green, one non-coalition National, nine Democrats, one Independent and one One Nation. Senator terms are six years (three for territories), and took their seats from 1 July 1999, except the territories who took their seats immediately.

== Australia ==
Senate (STV GV) — 1999–2002—Turnout 95.34% (CV) — Informal 3.24%
Party	Votes	%	Swing	Seats won	Seats	Change
Labor	4,182,963	37.31	+1.16	17	29	Steady
Liberal/National (Joint Ticket)	2,452,407	21.87	−2.62	5		
Liberal	1,528,730	13.63	−2.61	11	31	Steady
National	208,536	1.86	−1.01	0	3	▼2
Country Liberal	36,063	0.32	−0.05	1	1	Steady
Liberal–National coalition	4,225,673	37.70	−6.27	17	35	▼2
One Nation	1,007,439	8.99	*	1	1	▲1
Democrats	947,940	8.45	−2.37	4	9	▲2
Australian Greens	305,058	2.72	−0.45	0	1	▼1
Christian Democrats	122,516	1.09	+0.01			
Unity	93,968	0.83	*			
Australia First	46,765	0.41	*			
Shooters	38,188	0.34	−0.71			
Democratic Labor	29,893	0.27	−0.06			
Harradine Group	24,254	0.22	−0.08	1	1	Steady
Democratic Socialist	24,158	0.22	*			
Women's Party	20,495	0.18	−0.27			
Abolish Child Support/Family Court Party	15,276	0.14	*			
Queensland First	11,554	0.10	*			
Natural Law	11,152	0.10	−0.06			
Nuclear Disarmament	9,685	0.09	*			
Citizens Electoral Council	9,403	0.08	*			
Reclaim Australia: Reduce Immigration	8,019	0.07	−0.34			
One Australia	7,572	0.07	−0.34			
Other	58,577	0.5	≤0			
Total	11,211,903			40	76	
Invalid/blank votes	375,181	3.2				
Turnout	11,584,909	95.3				
Registered voters	12,154,050					
Source: AEC Election 2001

== New South Wales ==
Elected	#	Senator	Party
1998
1998	1	Steve Hutchins	Labor
1998	2	Bill Heffernan	Liberal
1998	3	John Faulkner	Labor
1998	4	John Tierney	Liberal
1998	5	Aden Ridgeway	Democrats
1998	6	Michael Forshaw	Labor
1996
1996	1	Marise Payne	Liberal
1996	2	Suzanne West	Labor
1996	3	David Brownhill	National
1996	4	George Campbell	Labor
1996	5	Helen Coonan	Liberal
1996	6	Vicki Bourne	Democrats

1998 Australian federal election: Senate, New South Wales
Party	Candidate	Votes	%	±%
Quota		536,533		
Labor	1. Steve Hutchins (elected 1); 2. John Faulkner (elected 3); 3. Michael Forshaw (elected 6); 4. Ursula Stephens	1,452,560	38.7	+1.5
Coalition	1. Bill Heffernan (Lib) (elected 2); 2. John Tierney (Lib) (elected 4); 3. Sandy Macdonald (Nat); 4. Concetta Fierravanti-Wells (Lib)	1,375,563	36.6	−4.8
One Nation	1. David Oldfield; 2. Brian Burston; 3. Bevan O'Regan	361,009	9.6	+9.6
Democrats	1. Aden Ridgeway (elected 5); 2. Matthew Baird; 3. Suzzanne Reddy; 4. David Mendelssohn	275,910	7.4	−2.1
Greens	1. John Sutton; 2. Catherine Moore; 3. Lee Rhiannon; 4. Suzie Russell	81,612	2.2	−0.1
Unity	1. Jason Yat-Sen Li; 2. Sonja Stockreiter; 3. Sam McGuid; 4. Kieran Ginges; 5. Nicholas Hassapis	61,607	1.6	+1.6
Christian Democrats	1. Graham McLennan; 2. Janne Petersen; 3. Tom Allanson; 4. Rex Morgan; 5. Michael McLennan	58,079	1.5	−0.5
Australia First	1. Victor Shen; 2. Greg Willson	29,660	0.8	+0.8
Democratic Socialist	1. Marina Carman; 2. Peter Boyle	8,221	0.2	+0.2
Reclaim Australia	1. Rodney Smith; 2. Edwin Woodger	8,019	0.2	−1.0
Nuclear Disarmament	1. Michael Denborough; 2. Yvonne Francis	6,489	0.2	+0.2
Abolish Child Support	1. Justice Abolish; 2. Richard Mezinec	5,810	0.2	+0.2
Group G	1. Malcolm Lees; 2. Warwick Rankin	5,745	0.2	+0.2
No Aircraft Noise	1. Chris Nash; 2. Jane Waddell	5,035	0.1	−0.4
Natural Law	1. Richard Nolan; 2. Bev Seymour	4,602	0.1	0.0
Citizens Electoral Council	1. Robert Butler; 2. Glenys Collins; 3. Lindsay Cosgrove	4,403	0.1	+0.1
Group J	1. David Mouldfield; 2. Paul-Ian Handsome	2,786	0.1	+0.1
Independent	Pauline Pantsdown	2,295	0.1	+0.1
Socialist Equality	1. Nick Beams; 2. Carol Divjak	1,808	0.1	+0.1
Group D	1. Mick Gallagher; 2. John Mawson	1,690	0.1	+0.1
Group S	1. Graeme Melville; 2. Philip Broadbridge	808	0.0	0.0
Group P	1. Patricia Poulos; 2. John Holley	708	0.0	0.0
Group R	1. Robert Schollbach; 2. Amanda Stirling	415	0.0	0.0
Independent	Mehmet Yaglipinar	256	0.0	0.0
Independent	Paul Sarks	165	0.0	0.0
Independent	Richard Ross	133	0.0	0.0
Independent	Ron Poulsen	117	0.0	0.0
Independent	Adrian Vaughan	72	0.0	0.0
Independent	Party Parslow	59	0.0	0.0
Independent	Stani Joseph	54	0.0	0.0
Independent	Tom Kumar	35	0.0	0.0
Total formal votes		3,755,725	96.7	+0.5
Informal votes		128,608	3.3	−0.5
Turnout		3,884,333	96.3	−0.4

== Victoria ==
Elected	#	Senator	Party
1998
1998	1	Stephen Conroy	Labor
1998	2	Judith Troeth	Liberal
1998	3	Kim Carr	Labor
1998	4	Julian McGauran	National
1998	5	Jacinta Collins	Labor
1998	6	Tsebin Tchen	Liberal
1996
1996	1	Richard Alston	Liberal
1996	2	Robert Ray	Labor
1996	3	Rod Kemp	Liberal
1996	4	Barney Cooney	Labor
1996	5	Kay Patterson	Liberal
1996	6	Lyn Allison	Democrats

1998 Australian federal election: Senate, Victoria
Party	Candidate	Votes	%	±%
Quota		406,175		
Labor	1. Stephen Conroy (elected 1); 2. Kim Carr (elected 3); 3. Jacinta Collins (elected 5); 4. Wendy Boyle	1,153,161	40.6	+0.8
Coalition	1. Judith Troeth (Lib) (elected 2); 2. Julian McGauran (Nat) (elected 4); 3. Tsebin Tchen (Lib) (elected 6); 4. Karen Synon (Lib); 5. Dino de Marchi (Lib); 6. Anna Macgowan (Lib)	1,076,841	37.9	−3.5
Democrats	1. Jim Downey; 2. Matthew Townsend; 3. Ken Saunders; 4. Alison Harcourt	279,788	9.8	−1.1
One Nation	1. Robyn Spencer; 2. Ben Buckley	117,048	4.1	+4.1
Greens	1. Charmaine Clarke; 2. David Risstrom; 3. Liz Conor	70,872	2.5	−0.4
Shooters	1. Graham Eames; 2. Neville Sayers; 3. Alan Hutchison; 4. Graeme Forbes	34,434	1.2	+0.5
Democratic Labor	1. John Mulholland; 2. Pat Crea	29,894	1.1	−0.2
Unity	1. Bill Cope; 2. Phong Nguyen; 3. Wellington Lee; 4. Ricci Stewart; 5. Markham Rose; 6. Vivien Cerolini; 7. Naji Imam; 8. Mary Kalantzis	20,603	0.7	+0.7
Christian Democrats	1. Graham Murray; 2. Ken Cook	13,881	0.5	−0.1
Women's Party	1. Deb Nicholson; 2. Pat O'Brien	9,711	0.3	+0.3
Australian Bill of Rights	1. Eric Bullmore; 2. David Sydenham	9,314	0.3	+0.3
Australia First	1. Denis McCormack; 2. Colin Godfrey	6,081	0.2	+0.2
Reform	1. Ray Matheson; 2. Ted Drane	5,208	0.2	+0.2
Nuclear Disarmament	1. Gareth Smith; 2. Jacob Grech	3,196	0.1	+0.1
Abolish Child Support	1. Abboud Haidar; 2. John Abbotto	3,094	0.1	+0.1
Natural Law	1. Byron Rigby; 2. Raymond Schlager; 3. Lorna Scurfield	2,607	0.1	+0.1
Democratic Socialist	1. Jo Williams; 2. Vannessa Hearman	2,294	0.1	0.1
Group B	1. Joe Toscano; 2. Steve Roper	2,205	0.1	0.0
Socialist Equality	1. Sue Phillips; 2. Wil Marshall	1,392	0.0	0.0
Citizens Electoral Council	1. Craig Isherwood; 2. Robert Barwick	821	0.0	0.0
Independent	Cecil G. Murgatroyd	389	0.0	0.0
Independent	Malcolm McClure	168	0.0	0.0
Independent	Graham Smith	82	0.0	0.0
Independent	M H Pech	67	0.0	0.0
Independent	David Heffron	54	0.0	0.0
Total formal votes		2,843,218	96.2	−0.2
Informal votes		111,486	3.8	+0.2
Turnout		2,952,735	96.5	0.0

== Queensland ==
Elected	#	Senator	Party
1998
1998	1	Jan McLucas	Labor
1998	2	Warwick Parer	Liberal
1998	3	Heather Hill	One Nation
1998	4	Joe Ludwig	Labor
1998	5	Brett Mason	Liberal
1998	6	John Woodley	Democrats
1996
1996	1	Ian Macdonald	Liberal
1996	2	John Hogg	Labor
1996	3	Ron Boswell	National
1996	4	John Herron	Liberal
1996	5	Brenda Gibbs	Labor
1996	6	Andrew Bartlett	Democrats

1998 Australian federal election: Senate, Queensland
Party	Candidate	Votes	%	±%
Quota		286,245		
Labor	1. Jan McLucas (elected 1); 2. Joe Ludwig (elected 4); 3. Jann Piasecki	654,623	32.7	+2.3
Liberal	1. Warwick Parer (elected 2); 2. Brett Mason (elected 5); 3. David MacGibbon; 4. Deborah Kember	570,692	28.5	−6.9
One Nation	1. Heather Hill (elected 3); 2. Len Harris; 3. Sue Gordon; 4. David Anning; 5. Barry Evans	297,245	14.9	+14.9
National	1. Bill O'Chee; 2. Thomas Bradley; 3. Teresa Cobb	190,662	9.5	−5.5
Democrats	1. John Woodley (elected 6); 2. John Cherry; 3. Megan Bathurst	156,451	7.8	−5.4
Greens	1. Drew Hutton; 2. Desiree Mahoney; 3. Chris Gwin	42,264	2.1	−0.3
Christian Democrats	1. John Bradford; 2. Kerry Blackman; 3. Judy McKenzie	28,826	1.4	+0.9
Queensland First	1. David Colston; 2. Dawn Colston	11,554	0.6	+0.6
Unity	1. Harry Fong; 2. Chris Toogood	9,487	0.5	+0.5
Women's Party	1. Mary Kelly; 2. Jenny Hughey	9,103	0.5	−0.2
One Australia	1. Mario Zocchi; 2. Ray Buckley	7,572	0.4	+0.2
Abolish Child Support	1. Bruce the Family; 2. Steve Southall	4,905	0.2	+0.2
Australia First	1. Eric Nagle; 2. Klaus Duke	4,897	0.2	+0.2
Democratic Socialist	1. Andy Gianniotis; 2. Coral Wynter	4,394	0.2	+0.2
Family Law Reform	1. Barry Weedon; 2. Robyn Somers	2,326	0.1	+0.1
Reform	1. Brenda Moloney; 2. Terry Fleming	2,011	0.1	+0.1
Citizens Electoral Council	1. Maurice Hetherington; 2. Ray Gillham	1,785	0.1	+0.1
Natural Law	1. Geoff Wilson; 2. Dorothy McKenzie	1,782	0.1	+0.1
Group B	1. Jan Linsley; 2. Percy Meredith	941	0.0	0.0
Group C	1. Noel Payne; 2. Jim Pavier	685	0.0	0.0
Group S	1. Selwyn Johnston; 2. Aaron Johnston	661	0.0	0.0
Independent	Michelle MacNevin	484	0.0	0.0
Independent	Kenny Dalton	147	0.0	0.0
Independent	Bryan Peach	141	0.0	0.0
Independent	Terry Sharples	51	0.0	0.0
Independent	Doug Hodgetts	21	0.0	0.0
Total formal votes		2,003,710	97.0	+0.3
Informal votes		62,754	3.0	−0.3
Turnout		2,066,464	94.9	−0.2

== Western Australia ==
Elected	#	Senator	Party
1998
1998	1	Chris Ellison	Liberal
1998	2	Peter Cook	Labor
1998	3	Ian Campbell	Liberal
1998	4	Chris Evans	Labor
1998	5	Brian Greig	Democrats
1998	6	Sue Knowles	Liberal
1996
1996	1	Winston Crane	Liberal
1996	2	Jim McKiernan	Labor
1996	3	Ross Lightfoot	Liberal
1996	4	Mark Bishop	Labor
1996	5	Alan Eggleston	Liberal
1996	6	Andrew Murray	Democrats

1998 Australian federal election: Senate, Western Australia
Party	Candidate	Votes	%	±%
Quota		151,974		
Liberal	1. Chris Ellison (elected 1); 2. Ian Campbell (elected 3); 3. Sue Knowles (elected 6); 4. Ivan Ivankovic	408,696	38.2	−7.6
Labor	1. Peter Cook (elected 2); 2. Chris Evans (elected 4); 3. Rhonda Griffiths; 4. Sue Ellery; 5. Lois Anderson; 6. Chilip Foo	368,821	34.7	+0.7
One Nation	1. John Fischer; 2. Colin Tincknell; 3. Martin Suter	110,231	10.4	+10.4
Democrats	1. Brian Greig (elected 5); 2. Stephen Crabbe; 3. Margot Clifford	68,057	6.4	−3.0
Greens	1. Dee Margetts; 2. Kayt Davies; 3. Alison Xamon	61,029	5.7	0.0
National	1. Beryle Morgan; 2. Dudley Maslen	13,428	1.3	−0.8
Christian Democrats	1. Justin Moseley; 2. Peter Johnson	10,258	1.0	+0.3
Group N	1. Kate Hobbs; 2. Morris Bessant	4,274	0.4	+0.4
Democratic Socialist	1. Sarah Stephen; 2. Roberto Jorquera	4,237	0.4	+0.4
Shooters	1. Raymond Motteram; 2. Ken Taylor	3,751	0.3	+0.3
Unity	1. Ted Wilkes; 2. Mai-Yie Leung; 3. Michael Carey	2,270	0.2	+0.2
Abolish Child Support	1. Brendan Griffin; 2. Sam Johnson	1,940	0.2	+0.2
Citizens Electoral Council	1. Tony Drake; 2. Jean Robinson	1,496	0.1	+0.1
Group O	1. Joan Torr; 2. Roger Pratt	1,206	0.1	+0.1
Republican	1. Michael O'Donnell; 2. Kerry McNally	1,023	0.1	+0.1
Taxi Operators	1. Alan Bateson; 2. Rick Finney	549	0.1	+0.1
Independent	Rod Garcia	385	0.0	0.0
Total formal votes		1,063,811	97.3	+0.8
Informal votes		29,352	2.7	−0.8
Turnout		1,093,163	95.8	+0.2

== South Australia ==
Elected	#	Senator	Party
1998
1998	1	Amanda Vanstone	Liberal
1998	2	Nick Bolkus	Labor
1998	3	Nick Minchin	Liberal
1998	4	John Quirke	Labor
1998	5	Meg Lees	Democrats
1998	6	Alan Ferguson	Liberal
1996
1996	1	Robert Hill	Liberal
1996	2	Rosemary Crowley	Labor
1996	3	Natasha Stott Despoja	Democrats
1996	4	Grant Chapman	Liberal
1996	5	Chris Schacht	Labor
1996	6	Jeannie Ferris	Liberal

1998 Australian federal election: Senate, South Australia
Party	Candidate	Votes	%	±%
Quota		135,260		
Liberal	1. Amanda Vanstone (elected 1); 2. Nick Minchin (elected 3); 3. Alan Ferguson (elected 6); 4. Joy De Leo	383,637	40.5	−5.3
Labor	1. Nick Bolkus (elected 2); 2. John Quirke (elected 4); 3. Bill Hender	303,299	32.0	−0.2
Democrats	1. Meg Lees (elected 5); 2. Michael Pilling; 3. Alex Bowie; 4. Natalija Apponyi	117,619	12.4	−2.1
One Nation	1. Len Spencer; 2. Malcolm Rumbelow; 3. Monica Reimann	91,911	9.7	+9.7
Greens	1. Craig Wilkins; 2. Michelle Drummond	20,895	2.2	+0.2
Christian Democrats	1. Bob Randall; 2. Colin Sinclair	9,598	1.0	+0.3
Australia First	1. Peter Davis; 2. Bill Fradd	6,127	0.6	+0.6
National	1. Ellis Wayland; Robin Dixon-Thompson	4,445	0.5	+0.5
Democratic Socialist	1. Melanie Sjoberg; 2. Kathy Newnam	4,256	0.4	+0.4
Group E	1. Chris Harms; 2. Kirsti Harms	1,487	0.1	+0.1
Group L	1. Bernice Pfitzner; 2. Erik Eriksen; 3. Sean Heylen	1,466	0.1	+0.1
Citizens Electoral Council	1. Tommy Tonkin; 2. Pompeo Feleppa	898	0.1	+0.1
Group D	1. Lindsay Simmons; 2. Pat Brown	625	0.1	+0.1
Independent	Neil Russell-Taylor	309	0.0	0.0
Independent	Graham Neave	245	0.0	0.0
Total formal votes		946,816	97.2	+0.5
Informal votes		27,424	2.8	−0.5
Turnout		974,240	96.8	+0.4

== Tasmania ==
Elected	#	Senator	Party
1998
1998	1	Kerry O'Brien	Labor
1998	2	Eric Abetz	Liberal
1998	3	Shayne Murphy	Labor
1998	4	Brian Gibson	Liberal
1998	5	Brian Harradine	Independent
1998	6	Kay Denman	Labor
1996
1996	1	Jocelyn Newman	Liberal
1996	2	Sue Mackay	Labor
1996	3	Paul Calvert	Liberal
1996	4	Nick Sherry	Labor
1996	5	John Watson	Liberal
1996	6	Bob Brown	Greens

1998 Australian federal election: Senate, Tasmania
Party	Candidate	Votes	%	±%
Quota		44,054		
Labor	1. Kerry O'Brien (elected 1); 2. Shayne Murphy (elected 3); 3. Kay Denman (elected 6)	128,377	41.6	+2.5
Liberal	1. Eric Abetz (elected 2); 2. Brian Gibson (elected 4); 3. Guy Barnett; 4. Peter Collenette	104,268	33.8	−8.4
Independent	Brian Harradine (elected 5)	24,254	7.9	+7.9
Greens	1. Louise Crossley; 2. Simon Baptist	17,905	5.8	−2.9
Democrats	1. Robert Bell; 2. Debbie Butler; 3. Chris Ivory	12,107	3.9	−3.2
One Nation	1. Peter Stokes; 2. Michael Cartwright; 3. Leigh Spicer	11,655	3.7	+3.7
Tasmania First	1. David Pickford; 2. David Jackson; 3. Petita Abblitt	4,548	1.5	+1.5
Abolish Child Support	1. Ian Hickman; 2. Fred Lombardi	1,750	0.5	+0.5
Christian Democrats	1. Don Rogers; 2. Beryl Rogers	945	0.3	−0.2
Women's Party	1. Lin MacQueen; 2. Carolyn Bindon	804	0.2	−0.4
Democratic Socialist	1. Kamala Emanuel; 2. Ian Jamieson	754	0.2	+0.2
Independent	Norma Jamieson	659	0.2	+0.2
Republican	1. Jenny Sheridan; 2. Rena Dare	249	0.1	+0.1
Independent	Laurie Heathorn	75	0.0	0.0
Independent	Steven Suli	27	0.0	0.0
Total formal votes		308,377	97.0	+0.2
Informal votes		9,704	3.0	−0.2
Turnout		318,081	96.5	−0.4

== Australian Capital Territory ==
Elected	#	Senator	Party
1998
1998	1	Kate Lundy	Labor
1998	2	Margaret Reid	Liberal

1998 Australian federal election: Senate, Australian Capital Territory
Party	Candidate	Votes	%	±%
Quota		65,679		
Labor	1. Kate Lundy (elected 1); 2. Peter Conway	83,867	42.6	0.0
Liberal	1. Margaret Reid (elected 2); 2. Gayle Richards	61,385	31.2	−7.8
Democrats	1. Rick Farley; 2. Wayne Sievers	32,833	16.9	+6.7
One Nation	1. Estelle O'Brien; 2. Jeremy Leyland	9,621	4.8	+4.8
Greens	1. Deb Foskey; 2. Lesley Christian	6,385	3.2	−2.6
Independent	John Miller	923	0.5	+0.5
Women's Party	1. Annette Haridan; 2. Susanne Edwards	876	0.4	+0.4
Abolish Child Support	1. Peter Rogers; 2. Anthony Hardy	868	0.4	+0.4
Independent	Cec Harris	170	0.1	+0.1
Independent	Andrew Edgar	107	0.1	+0.1
Total formal votes		197,035	98.0	+0.5
Informal votes		3,952	2.0	−0.5
Turnout		200,987	96.3	+0.1

== Northern Territory ==
Elected	#	Senator	Party
1998
1998	1	Trish Crossin	Labor
1998	2	Grant Tambling	CLP

1998 Australian federal election: Senate, Northern Territory
Party	Candidate	Votes	%	±%
Quota		31,001		
Labor	1. Trish Crossin (elected 1); 2. Charlie Phillips	38,259	41.2	−3.9
Country Liberal	1. Grant Tambling (elected 2); 2. Maisie Austin	36,063	38.8	−7.9
One Nation	1. Ted Hagger; 2. Dee Mills	8,657	9.3	+9.3
Democrats	1. Victor Edwards; 2. Peter Clements	5,119	5.5	+3.7
Greens	1. Lex Martin; 2. Andy Gough	4,232	4.5	−1.9
Independent	Jonathan Polke	672	0.7	+0.7
Total formal votes		93,002	98.0	+0.8
Informal votes		1,901	2.0	−0.8
Turnout		94,903	90.6	+1.4

== See also ==
- Candidates of the 1998 Australian federal election
- Members of the Australian Senate, 1999–2002
