= Taxi Operators Political Service =

Australian political party

The Taxi Operators Political Service (Oceania) was a minor Australian political party that was active from 1997 to 2001. Formally registered on 25 July 1997 with the Australian Electoral Commission, it was deregistered after the 2001 federal election on 21 December. It contested the Senate in Western Australia in the 1998 and 2001 federal elections.

== See also ==
- Transport Matters Party (2018-since)
