= Mary Kalantzis =

Australian author and academic

Mary Kalantzis (born 1949) is an Australian author and academic, and is a former dean of the College of Education at the University of Illinois at Urbana–Champaign in the United States. Her work examines Australian multiculturalism.

Through her career she has written and published many books. She was born in Greece, in the year 1949 but shortly moved to Australia with her parents in the year 1953. She is also one of the founders of the "Unity Party" that opposes the anti-immigration policies.

== Biography ==
Mary Kalantzis was born in a village in the Peloponnese, Greece, and migrated to Australia with her family in 1953. She was the eldest of three children, to Nicholas and Diamondo. In 1982 she was the recipient of a Commonwealth Postgraduate Research Award, and in 1990-91 she was a Fulbright Scholar-in-Residence at Keene State College of the University System of New Hampshire in the United States. She has since held (in reverse chronological order) appointments as dean of the Faculty of Education, Language and Community Services at RMIT University, director of the Institute of Interdisciplinary Studies at James Cook University of North Queensland, director of the Centre for Workplace Communication and Culture at the University of Technology, Sydney and a senior research fellow at the Centre for Multicultural Studies at the University of Wollongong. While serving as Dean at RMIT University she was elected president of the Australian Council of Deans of Education. Her service activities include being a board member of Teaching Australia, belonging to The National Institute for Quality Teaching and School Leadership, appointment as a commissioner of the Australian Human Rights and Equal Opportunity Commission, chair of the Queensland Ethnic Affairs Ministerial Advisory Committee, vice president of the National Languages and Literacy Institute of Australia and a member of the Australia Council's Community Cultural Development Board.

In 1998, Kalantzis was one of the founders of the Unity Party, created to oppose the anti-immigration politics of Pauline Hanson and One Nation.

== Author ==
She has been an author or co-author of books, research reports and refereed journal articles. These include:

- A Place in the Sun: Re-creating the Australian Way of Life, 2000, Mary Kalantzis and Bill Cope
- Productive Diversity: Organisational Life in the Era of Civic Pluralism and Total Globalisation, Mary Kalantzis and Bill Cope
- Reconciliation, Multiculturalism, Identities : Difficult Dialogues, Sensible Solutions, Mary Kalantzis and Bill Cope
- Transformations in Language and Learning : Perspectives on Multiliteracies, Mary Kalantzis and Bill Cope
- Multiliteracies : Literacy Learning and the Design of Social Futures, 2000, Mary Kalantzis and Bill Cope
- Australia's Population Challenge : The National Population Summit, Michael Hickinbotham, Bert Dennis, Graeme Hugo and Mary Kalantzis
- Learning for the Future : New Worlds, New Literacies, New Learning, New People, Mary Kalantzis and Gella Varnava-Skoura
- The Powers of Literacy : A Genre Approach to Teaching Writing, Bill Cope and Mary Kalantzis
- New Learning : Elements of a Science of Education, Mary Kalantzis and Bill Cope
- Explain? Argue? Discuss? : Writing for Essays and Exams, Mary Kalantzis and Peter Wignell
- The Learning by Design Guide, 2005, Bill Cope and Mary Kalantzis
- Literacy Matters: Issues for New Times, Ambigapathy Pandian and Mary Kalantzis
