= No GST Party =

Former Australian political party

The No Goods and Services Tax Party (usually called No GST), previously the Abolish Child Support and Family Court Party, was a minor Australian political party registered between 1997 and 2006 which fielded candidates between the 1998 and 2004 federal elections. The change of name in 2001 was largely a response to the Howard Government's implementation of the Goods and Services Tax. It polled low totals. One Nation founder David Ettridge contested the Senate in Queensland in 2001 for the party.

At the 1998 federal election the party fielded 11 candidates for the House of Representatives and 6 for the Senate. A campaign tactic used by the party at this election was to have a candidate adopt the name of a political slogan which therefore appeared on the ballot paper. This included "Justice Abolish Child Support and the Family Court" who was a candidate for a Senate seat in NSW, "Prime Minister John Piss the Family Court and Legal Aid" who was a candidate for Bennelong and "Bruce the Family Court Refuses My Daughter's Right to Know Her Father" who was a candidate for a Senate seat in Queensland. The Electoral Act was subsequently amended to prevent this tactic. The party gained 0.02% (2,312) first preference votes nationally for the House of Representatives and 0.14% (15,276) first preference votes nationally for the Senate.

While David Ettridge was a high profile candidate in 2001, attracting 1.13% (24,319) first preference votes in Queensland, it was Mick Gallagher who came close to being elected in New South Wales, despite receiving only 0.66% (25,734) first preference votes, due to preference swaps with other parties. This was the peak of the party's electoral popularity, gaining 0.12% (14,164) first preference votes nationally for the House of Representatives and 0.43% (50,053) first preference votes nationally for the Senate.

The party also fielded candidates at the 1999 Victorian state election, various by-elections and the 2002 South Australian state election.

The final election contested by the party was the 2004 federal election in which the party gained 0.07% (7,802) first preference votes nationally for the House of Representatives and 0.08% (9,713) first preference votes nationally for the Senate.

The party was automatically de-registered in 2006, along with all non-parliamentary political parties, as a result of the Electoral and Referendum Amendment (Electoral Integrity and Other Measures) Act 2006. The party did not apply for re-registration.

== See also ==
- Non-Custodial Parents Party (Equal Parenting): Australian political party
