= John Tierney (Australian politician) =

Australian politician

John Tierney AM

Senator for New South Wales
- In office 11 February 1991 – 14 April 2005
- Preceded by: Peter Baume
- Succeeded by: Concetta Fierravanti-Wells

Personal details
- Born: 21 January 1946 (age 80) Cooma, New South Wales
- Party: Liberal Party of Australia
- Education: University of Newcastle; University of Sydney
- Occupation: Lecturer

John William Tierney AM (born 21 January 1946), Australian politician, was a Liberal member of the Australian Senate from 1991 to 2005, representing the state of New South Wales.

Tierney was born in Cooma, and was educated at the University of Newcastle and the University of Sydney, gaining a Ph.D. in education. He was Senior Lecturer in Education at the University of Newcastle before entering politics.

Tierney was appointed to the Senate in February 1991 to succeed Peter Baume, who had resigned in January. Tierney was subsequently second on the coalition senate ticket for New South Wales and elected at the Senate elections of 1993 and 1998. He was dropped to fourth on the coalition senate ticket for New South Wales for the October 2004 Senate election and was defeated. He resigned from the Senate on 14 April 2005, and was replaced by Concetta Fierravanti-Wells, who had replaced Tierney as second on the coalition's Senate ticket.

In the 2012 Australia Day Honours Tierney received the Medal of the Order of Australia (OAM) for "service to the Parliament of Australia, to education, and to the community". His "significant service to people with polio" was recognised in the 2019 Queen's Birthday Honours with the award of Member of the Order of Australia (AM).
