= Unity Party (Australia) =

- President: Eddie Hwang
- Founded: 1997
- Registered: 25 August 1998
- Headquarters: PO Box 515 Applecross WA 6953
- Youth wing: Young Unity
- Ideology: Multiculturalism
- Political position: Centre
- NSW Legislative Council: 1 / 42 (1999–2007)

Website
- Archive (2001); Victoria; Western Australia; Blog 1 Blog 2

The Unity Party was a small multiculturist party in Australia, formed in 1997 and primarily active in the state of New South Wales. It was formed with the aim of opposing the rise of the controversial anti-immigration politician Pauline Hanson. Although initially billed as a party to unite Australians of all ethnicities against racism, Unity failed to draw significant support outside Australia's East Asian ethnic communities. After the demise of Pauline Hanson as a political force (prior to her return to politics in the late 2010s), Unity shifted focus onto ethnic community affairs at a local government level.

== History ==
=== Formation ===
Unity attracted much attention when it was founded in 1997, with Peter Wong, Mary Kalantzis, Bill Cope and Jason Yat-Sen Li among those involved in its creation.

The party ran candidates in almost every House of Representatives seat at the 1998 election. While they had hopes of winning a Senate seat in New South Wales with Jason Li, he fell well short. However, the party outpolled the Australian Democrats and Australian Greens in some House of Representatives seats. In the NSW Federal seat of Fowler, investment banker Andrew Su outpolled both the Democrats and One Nation. Subsequently, in the 1999 NSW state election, Su went on to poll more than the Liberals, Greens and Democrats in the safe Labor seat of Cabramatta.

The Unity Party was formally registered by the Australian Electoral Commission on 25 August 1998 under the name "Unity – Say No to Hanson".

=== Decline ===
As the Hanson movement began to disintegrate, it also negated Unity's main platform, and the party soon fell into internal tensions. The party's founder, Peter Wong, won a seat in the New South Wales Legislative Council with just 1% of the vote. This came against the backdrop of a series of resignations, including that of Li. Wong soon stepped down as leader in favour of a white Australian in an attempt to broaden the party's base.

Unity's activities largely died down throughout 2000 and Wong acted as a virtual independent in the Legislative Council. However, with the re-emergence of Hanson's One Nation party at the 2001 Western Australian state election, the party again came together and put together a large slate of candidates for the federal election that year. Despite having several prominent candidates (such as former Melbourne City Council member Wellington Lee in Victoria), they fell even further short of winning a seat in either house of federal parliament.

After their failure to break into federal parliament in 2001, Unity largely shifted its attentions to local government, running a number of candidates for local councils in largely non-white areas, primarily in suburban Sydney. It was deregistered by the AEC on 13 November 2003 for failing to have at least 500 members as required by electoral law. The party did not run any candidates in the 2004 federal election.

Wong continued to represent Unity in the NSW Parliament, until the expiry of his term in March 2007. At the 2007 NSW state election, lead Unity upper house candidate Le Lam won 1.2% of the vote, which was insufficient to win a seat.

The party did not contest the 2011 NSW state election, although Pauline Hanson did.

The party contested one New South Wales Legislative Assembly seat (Kogarah) in the 2015 state election, receiving 7.9% of the vote.

At the 2024 New South Wales local elections, a new party, Australia Multinational Unity Inc (also known simply as "Unity"), contested Burwood, Canterbury Bankstown and Ryde.

=== Youth faction ===
Unity also had a youth division, called Young Unity.

== Elected representatives ==
=== New South Wales ===
==== Legislative Council ====
- Peter Wong (1999–2007)

==== Auburn City Council ====
- Jack Au (until at least 2009)
- Le Lam (1999–2011)

==== Burwood Council ====
- Ernest Wong (2000–2005)

==== Canterbury Council ====
- Joshua Nam

==== Fairfield City Council ====
- Thang Ngo (1999–2008)

==== Hurstville City Council ====
- Nancy Liu (2008–2016)

==== Kogarah City Council ====
- Annie Tang (1999–2016)

==== Strathfield Council ====
- Alfred Tsang (2000–2005)

==== Willoughby City Council ====
- Sylvia Chao (elected 2004)

=== Victoria ===
==== Melbourne City Council ====
- Wellington Lee (1998–2001)

== Past presidents ==
- Peter Wong (1997–1999, 2007–2009)
- Ernest Wong

=== Past vice-presidents ===
- Adriane Hassapis (1999)

== Prominent past members ==
- Randa Abdel-Fattah, writer
- Silma Ihram, Muslim educationist
- Sarah Kemp, actress
- Andrew Su, ex investment banker and Chief Executive Officer, Compass Global Markets
- Jason Yat-Sen Li, member of the NSW Legislative Assembly elected for the Labor Party at the 2022 Strathfield state by-election

== See also ==
- Multicultural Progress Party
