= Wellington Lee =

Australian politician (1925–2022)

Wellington Lee AM OBE

Councillor of the City of Melbourne
- In office 1977–1990
- In office 1996–2001

Deputy Lord Mayor of the City of Melbourne
- In office 1999–2000

Personal details
- Born: 17 September 1925
- Died: 25 December 2022 (aged 97)
- Party: Labor (1974); Unity (1998–2001)

Wellington Lee, AM OBE (17 September 1925 – 25 December 2022) was an Australian politician and pharmacist who served as the Deputy Lord Mayor of Melbourne from 1999 to 2000.

== Life and career ==
Lee was born on 17 September 1925, in Darwin in Australia's Northern Territory. Lee's Chinese ancestors first arrived in Australia during the early 1850s Victorian gold rush. Growing up in Darwin, he attended Darwin Public School, then moved with his family to Queensland, where he continued his schooling at Longreach State School, Ingham Rural School and Toowoomba Grammar School. Later, he moved to Melbourne and completed a degree at the Victorian College of Pharmacy.

After the outbreak of the Second World War, Lee enlisted on 8 October 1943, and achieved a rank of leading aircraftman in the Royal Australian Air Force. For many years after the war, Lee remained on the Active Reserve of Officers, and served as the state executive of the Victorian RSL.

He worked as a pharmacist from 1950 and ran a pharmacy shop in Melbourne's Chinatown, on the corner of Little Bourke and Russell streets.

From 1978 to 1980 he was commissioner of the Melbourne and Metropolitan Board of Works, and was a Melbourne City Councillor from 1977 to 1990 and from 1996 to 2001. During his last two years as councillor, he also served as Deputy Lord Mayor of Melbourne.

Lee contested three federal elections: in 1974, contesting Kooyong for the Labor Party; in 1998, as third on the Unity Party's Senate ticket; and in 2001 at the top of the Unity ticket. He was unsuccessful on all of these occasions.

Lee died on 25 December 2022, at the age of 97.

== Oral History ==
An oral history interview with Lee recorded in 1998 is accessible through the National Library of Australia.

== Awards ==
- 1982 Order of the British Empire
- 1993 National Medal
- 1994 Medal of the Order of Australia
- 2003 Member of the Order of Australia
