= Louise Crossley =

Australian scientist and environmentalist

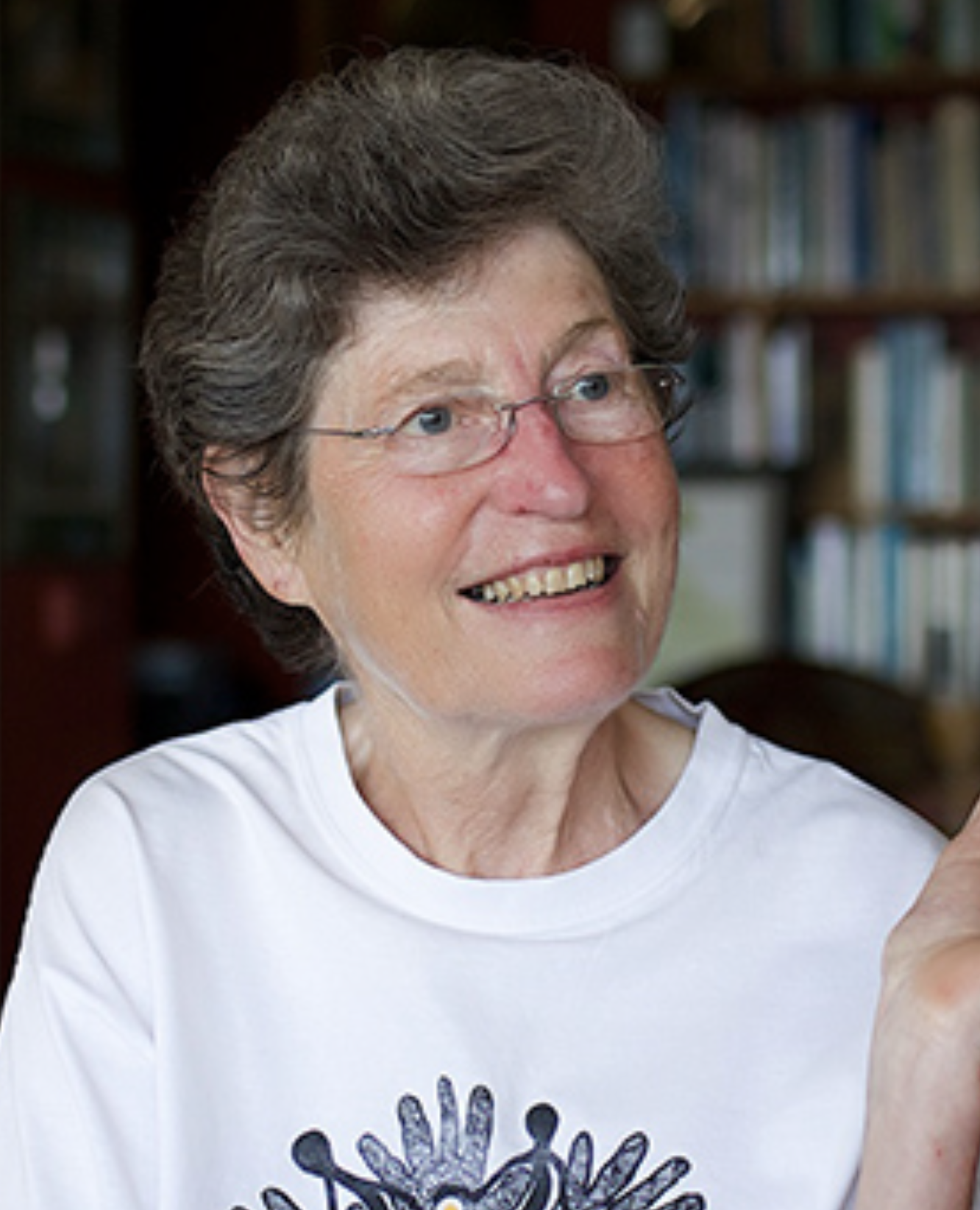
- Born: 1942
- Died: 2015 (aged 72–73)
- Education: BSc University of Cambridge PhD University of New South Wales

Louise Crossley (1942 – 30 July 2015) was an Australian scientist and environmentalist who was closely involved in the establishment of the Tasmanian Greens and the Global Greens.

== Early life and education ==
Crossley was born in Johannesburg, the second daughter of a colonial civil servant.

Crossley attended boarding school in South Africa from the age of four. In 1963 she graduated with a science degree from Cambridge University, and around the same time married her husband, Clive, a fellow scientist. They moved to Australia, where Crossley earned a doctorate in the history and philosophy of science from the University of New South Wales in 1980.

== Career ==
=== Scientific ===
In 1991 she was station leader at Mawson Station for the Australian Antarctic Division, the second woman to hold an equivalent position. She returned to work in the Antarctic again in 2000 and 2003.

=== Political ===
Returning to Australia, she became the first convenor of the Tasmanian Greens after its foundation in 1992, and later served as federal convenor of the Australian Greens. She contested Franklin in the 1993 federal election, the equivalent state seat in 1996 and 1998 and was the Greens' lead Senate candidate in Tasmania in 1998.

Crossley drafted the Global Greens Charter, the foundational document for 80 Greens parties across the world, adopted in Canberra in 2001.

Dr Crossley lived in Bruny Island, Tasmania, towards the end of her life and died in Hobart on 30 July 2015.
