= Family Law Reform Party =

Australian political party

The Family Law Reform Party was a minor Australian political party that contested the 1996 Lindsay by-election resulting from the voiding of the 1996 election result due to Liberal member-elect Jackie Kelly's continuing New Zealand citizenship.

== See also ==
- Non-Custodial Parents Party (Equal Parenting)
