= John Woodley =

Australian politician

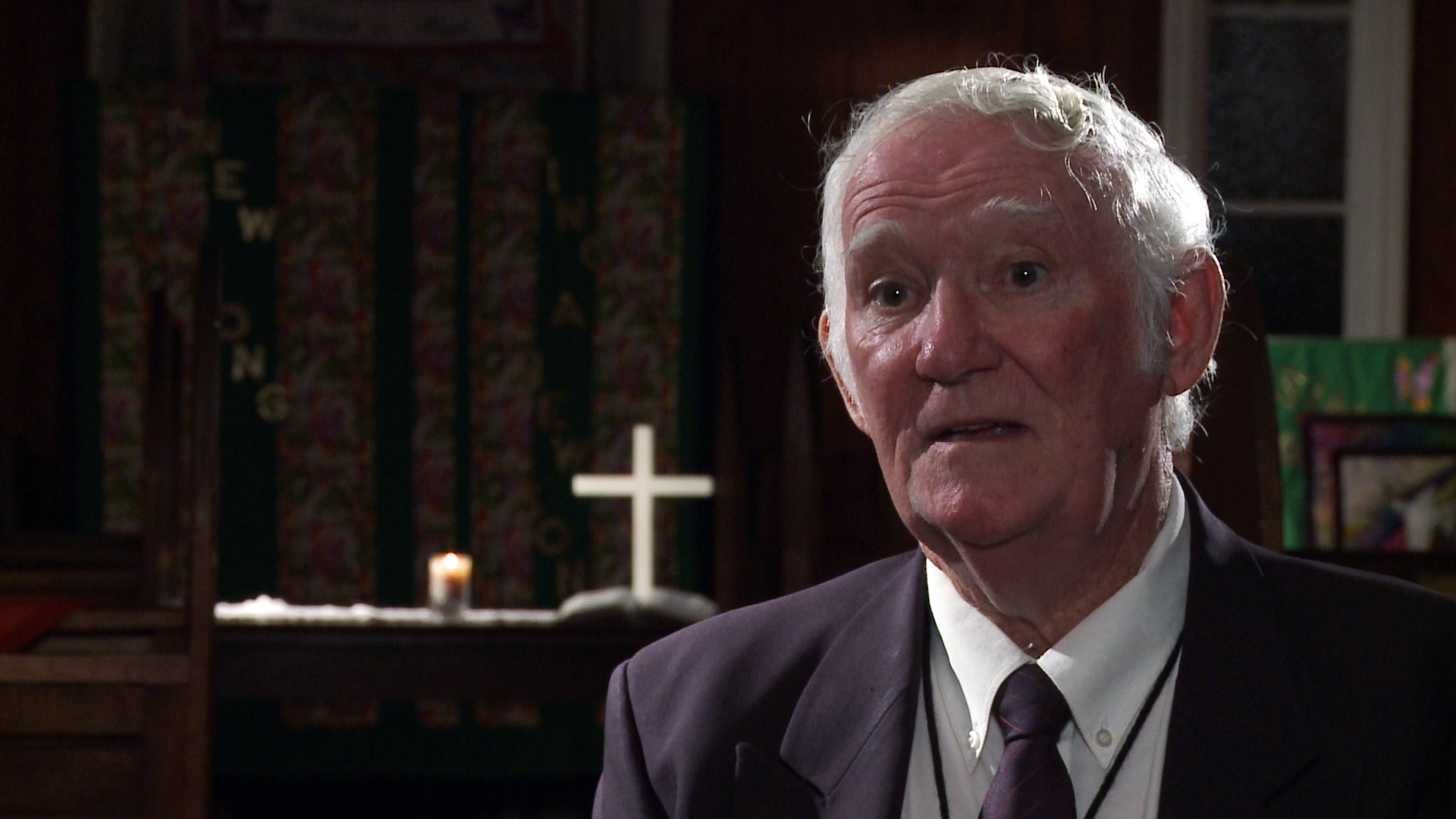

Senator for Queensland
- In office 1 July 1993 – 27 July 2001
- Preceded by: Florence Bjelke-Petersen
- Succeeded by: John Cherry

Personal details
- Born: 9 February 1938 (age 88) Brisbane, Queensland
- Party: Progressive Alliance (2003-2004)
- Other political affiliations: Democrat
- Occupation: Christian minister

John Woodley (born Brisbane, Queensland, 9 February 1938) is an ordained Uniting Church minister and was a Senator representing the state of Queensland, Australia, in the Australian Senate.

== Life before politics ==
Woodley was briefly in the Australian Defence Force from 1957 to 1959.

=== Education ===
Woodley was educated at the Melbourne College of Divinity and Brisbane College of Theology.

=== Christian ministry ===
Prior to entering politics, Woodley was ordained a minister of the Methodist Church in October 1962 and continued his clerical duties with its successor, the Uniting Church in Australia, after church union in June 1977.

During his ministry, Woodley worked mainly in rural churches and had extensive contact with Aboriginal people.

He served as Director of Social Responsibility in the Uniting Church, Queensland Synod, from 1977 to December 1984 and was very active fighting for justice during the Joh Bjelke-Petersen era in Queensland.

He was also a member of the Uniting Church in Australia's National Social Justice Committee between 1977 and 1982.

After his election, Woodley wished to remain a "Minister of the Word" and the church deemed his parish to be the Senate and his parishioners to be the people of Queensland.

He officially retired as a Uniting Church minister on the grounds of age on 1 September 2001. The 23rd Synod meeting of The Uniting Church in Australia, Queensland Synod, in October 2002 received a minute of appreciation for his ministry.

== Politician ==
Before his election, Woodley had been President of the Queensland Democrats, the Queensland Division of the Australian Democrats.

Woodley was elected in March 1993 as the second Australian Democrats Senator for Queensland to a term commencing on 1 July 1993. Woodley was for a time the Democrats' spokesperson on Aboriginal and Torres Strait Islander Affairs, Family Services, Regional Development and Agriculture.

Woodley chaired the year-long 1999/2000 Senate Inquiry entitled ‘Air Safety and Cabin Air Quality in the BAe 146 Aircraft’ which was overseen by the Senate Rural and Regional Affairs and Transport References Committee.

Woodley resigned from the Senate in August 2001 with three years to run in his second term, not long after the party's members voted for Natasha Stott Despoja to replace Meg Lees as the Parliamentary Leader of the Democrats. The reason given for his resignation was health reasons, but he also stated that "I don't have the same commitment to the new leadership team." Woodley was among the Democrat Senators who voted with Meg Lees to introduce the GST. The casual vacancy for his seat for the Democrats was filled by Senator John Cherry.

== After politics ==
Woodley made several public statements about Democrats' internal politics, consistently voicing support for former Leader Meg Lees. He left the Democrats not long after retiring from the Senate and soon joined the Australian Progressive Alliance, the breakaway party set up by Meg Lees after she resigned from the Democrats. He served as the National President of this Party, which wound up after unsuccessfully contesting the 2004 federal election.

In 2006, Woodley became a founding Patron of the Global Cabin Air Quality Executive (GCAQE), a position he still holds today.

Woodley is featured in the documentary 2010 Broken Wings and the 2015 feature film A Dark Reflection.

In retirement, Woodley continues to be active in church circles in Queensland.

== Memberships ==
- Senate Foreign Affairs, Defence and Trade Committee
- Council for Aboriginal Reconciliation (October 1997 – February 1999)
