= John Cherry (Australian politician) =

Australian politician (born 1965)

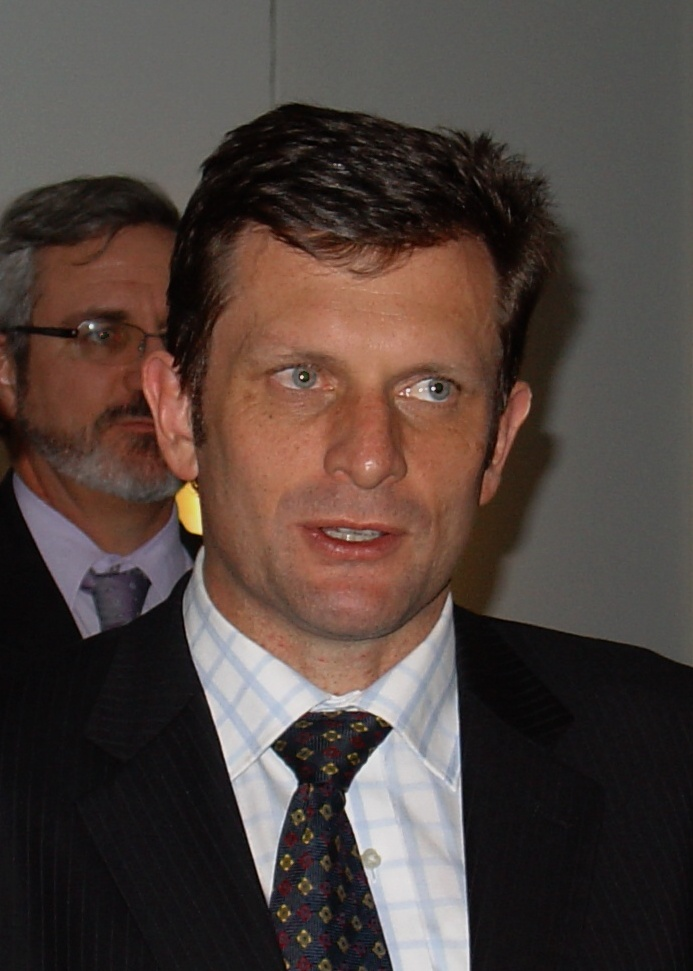
- Cherry in 2008

Senator for Queensland
- In office 31 July 2001 – 30 June 2005
- Preceded by: John Woodley

Personal details
- Born: 22 May 1965 (age 61) Kilcoy, Queensland
- Party: Australian Democrats (since 1993)
- Other political affiliations: Labor (until 1993)
- Occupation: Journalist

John Clifford Cherry (born 22 May 1965) is an Australian former politician who served as a senator from 2001 to 2005, representing the state of Queensland for the Australian Democrats. March 2005 he would commence in the role CEO of the Queensland Farmers Federation once his Senate term concluded.

Cherry was born in Kilcoy, Queensland. He studied law and economics at the University of Queensland, culminating in a master's degree in public administration. While at university, he joined the Australian Labor Party. He spent two years as a journalist with the Townsville Bulletin, then worked as an industrial officer with the State Public Services Federation until 1993, when he was appointed economics adviser first to Senator Cheryl Kernot, the then Senate leader of the Australian Democrats, and to her successor Meg Lees. As an adviser to the latter, Cherry was a principal player in negotiations for the 1999 introduction of the Goods and Services Tax (GST), a measure which was a triumph for the Coalition government led by John Howard but which caused a serious split in the Australian Democrats, leading to electoral downturn and loss of the party's Senate representation. He himself was defeated in the 2004 election, ceasing to be a senator on 30 June 2005.

As a senator, Cherry supported protection of Queensland banana growers from potentially diseased imports, conservation of the Great Barrier Reef and superannuation reform to include recognition of same-sex relationships.

== Bibliography ==
- Barns, Greg & John Cherry (March 2003). "Groundswell". Correspondence. Quarterly Essay. 9: 84–85.
