= Concetta Fierravanti-Wells =

Australian politician (born 1960)

The Honourable Concetta Fierravanti-Wells
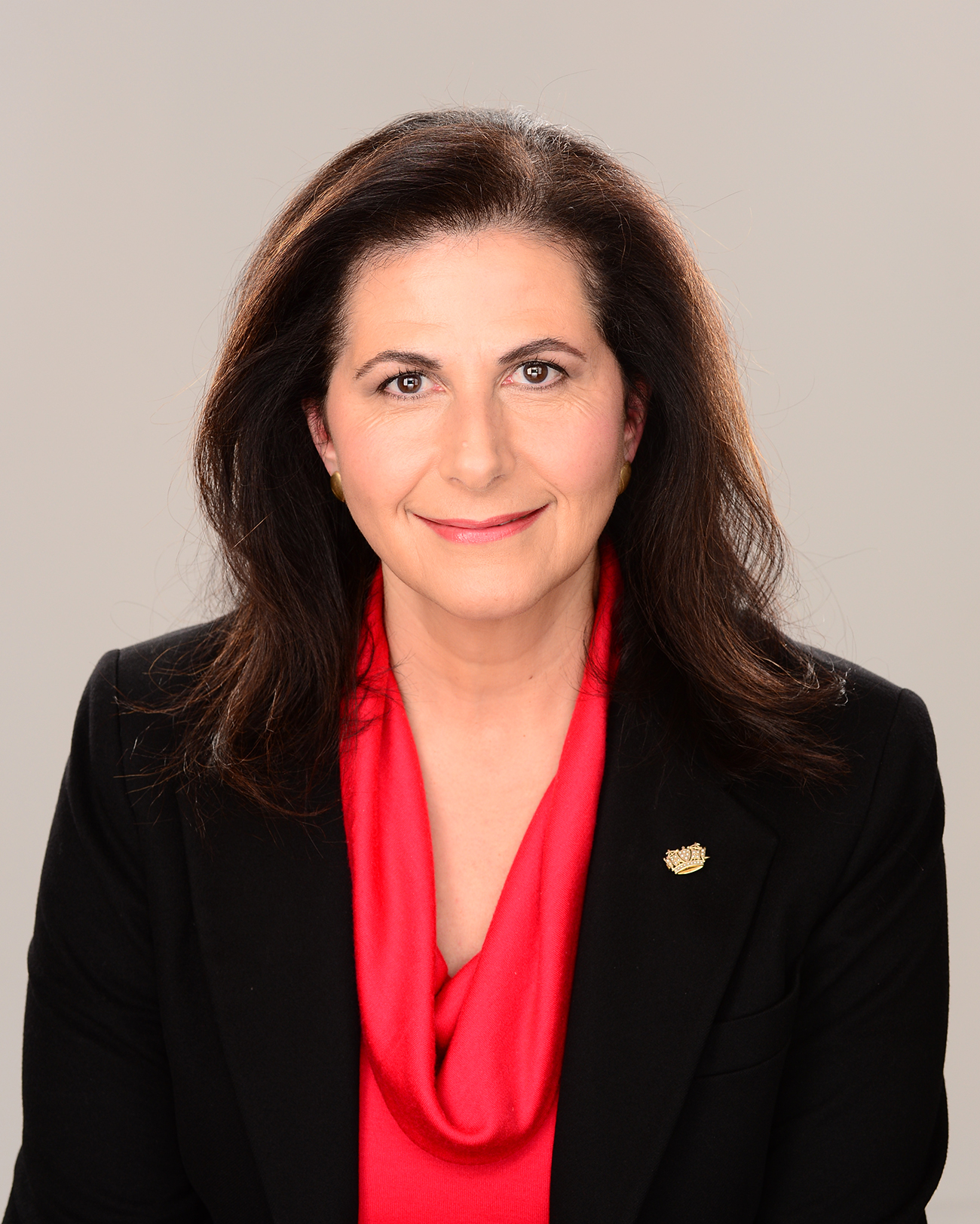

Minister for International Development and the Pacific
- In office 18 February 2016 – 21 August 2018
- Prime Minister: Malcolm Turnbull
- Preceded by: Steven Ciobo
- Succeeded by: Anne Ruston

Assistant Minister for Multicultural Affairs
- In office 15 September 2015 – 18 February 2016
- Prime Minister: Malcolm Turnbull
- Preceded by: Office established
- Succeeded by: Craig Laundy

Senator for New South Wales
- In office 5 May 2005 – 30 June 2022
- Preceded by: John Tierney
- Succeeded by: Ross Cadell

Personal details
- Born: Concetta Anna Fierravanti; 20 May 1960 (age 66) Wollongong, New South Wales, Australia
- Party: Liberal
- Spouse: John Wells (m. 1990)
- Education: Australian National University (BA, LL.B)
- Profession: Solicitor

Concetta Anna Fierravanti-Wells (née Fierravanti; (Note: Italian pronunciation: [konˈtʃɛtta ˈanna fjerraˈvanti].) born 20 May 1960) is an Australian politician who was a Senator for New South Wales from 2005 to 2022, representing the Liberal Party. She served as Minister for International Development and the Pacific in the Turnbull government from 2016 to 2018. She grew up in Port Kembla, New South Wales, and, prior to entering politics, worked as a lawyer and policy adviser.

== Early life ==
Fierravanti-Wells was born on 20 May 1960 in Wollongong, New South Wales. She is the daughter of Giuseppe and Antonia Fierravanti, both of whom were born in Calitri, Italy. Her father arrived in Australia in 1953 to work at the Port Kembla steelworks, and was joined by his future wife six years later. Fierravanti-Wells acquired Italian citizenship by descent in 1985, but renounced it in 1994 prior to standing for parliamentary preselection. She spoke Italian as her first language, learning English at kindergarten.

Fierravanti-Wells grew up in Port Kembla, attending St Patrick's Catholic Primary School and St Mary, Star of the Sea College in Wollongong. She went on to study at the Australian National University, completing a Bachelor of Arts in political science in European languages in 1980 and a Bachelor of Laws in 1982. While at university she was named Miss Rugby 1981 by the ACT Rugby Union, representing the ANU Rugby Club.

== Career ==
Fierravanti-Wells served her articles of clerkship with the Canberra firm of Macphillamy, Cummins and Gibson. She joined the office of the Australian Government Solicitor (AGS) in 1984, working for its ACT branch until 1986 and then joining its New South Wales branch. She was the acting principal legal officer at the Australian Quarantine and Inspection Service in 1990. In the same year, Fierravanti-Wells began working as a policy adviser for federal MP and shadow minister Jim Carlton. She was involved in drafting the proposed changes to the Australian Public Service under the federal opposition's Fightback! policy. After the Coalition's defeat at the 1993 federal election she was seconded to New South Wales premier John Fahey as his senior private secretary. Fierravanti-Wells re-joined the AGS in 1994 as a senior lawyer. She was also a consultant to MinterEllison from 2003.

Outside of her professional career, Fierravanti-Wells was the Australian representative on the General Council of Italians Abroad (Consiglio Generale degli Italiani all'Estero) from 1990 to 1998. She was made a knight of the Order of Merit of the Italian Republic in 1998, the youngest Australian to receive the honour. Fierravanti-Wells was one of the Coalition's nominees to the multicultural advisory committee for the 2000 Summer Olympics in Sydney. She also served on the board of Chris Riley's charity Youth Off The Streets from 1999 to 2004, including as chairman from 2002.

== Political career ==
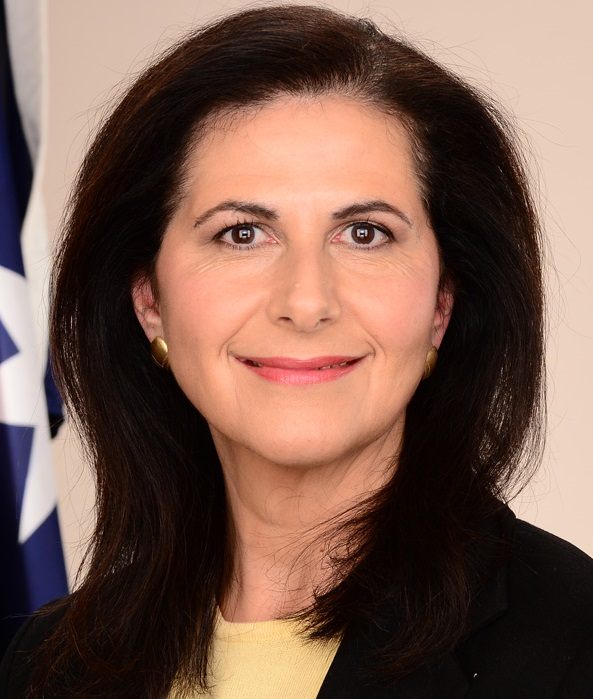
Fierravanti-Wells in 2015

Fierravanti-Wells was an unsuccessful candidate for Liberal preselection at the 1994 Warringah by-election, which saw future prime minister Tony Abbott elected to parliament. She was president of the party's Italian special branch from 1995 and elected to the state executive in 1996, also serving as a delegate to state council from 1995 and to federal council from 2000.

Fierravanti-Wells defeated incumbent senator John Tierney for Liberal preselection prior to the 2004 federal election, winning by 57 votes to 51 with the support of powerbroker David Clarke. Her victory followed four previous attempts to gain preselection. Normally Fierravanti-Wells would have taken her seat on 1 July 2005, however Tierney resigned in April prior to the expiration of his term. She was appointed to the resulting casual vacancy, and took her seat on 5 May.

Following the 2008 Liberal leadership spill, Fierravanti-Wells was appointed as a shadow parliamentary secretary under Malcolm Turnbull, with responsibility for immigration and citizenship. She was promoted to shadow minister for ageing when Tony Abbott replaced Turnbull as opposition leader in December 2009, adding the mental health portfolio following the 2010 election.

After the 2013 federal election, Fierravanti-Wells was appointed to the Abbott Ministry as the Parliamentary Secretary for Social Services from September 2013. In May 2015 she was also made parliamentary secretary to the Attorney-General, with a focus on anti-radicalisation. She was appointed as Assistant Minister for Multicultural Affairs in September 2015, following Turnbull's victory over Abbott in a leadership spill. Following the 2015 Parramatta shooting, Fierravanti-Wells stated that "we have been dealing with extremism and violent extremism as a national security issue, but what we really need to do is to be looking at it [as] a social issue with a national security angle". She supported ASIO director-general Duncan Lewis's request that Coalition MPs use more moderate language in reference to Islamic extremism, which was seen as controversial. She also stated that it was a duty of government to support "the modern and moderate interpretation" of Islam.

On 13 February 2016, it was announced that Fierravanti-Wells would be appointed Minister for International Development and the Pacific following a rearrangement in the First Turnbull Ministry. In April 2018, speaking at the Overseas Development Institute in London, Fierravanti-Wells said increasing Australia's foreign aid commitment was opposed by most in the country. "In Australia we had some research done where it showed that about 80% of Australians believe that we should not be spending more on foreign aid or that what we spend is about right". In 2018, Australia's foreign aid commitment stood at $3.9bn, its lowest ever level as a proportion of the budget: 0.22% of gross national income.

Fierravanti-Wells resigned from the ministry on 21 August 2018, following the Liberal Party leadership spill that day.

=== Political positions ===
During the Morrison government, Fierravanti-Wells was a member of the National Right faction of the Liberal Party. She was a member of Australians for a Constitutional Monarchy and served on the committee of a Liberal Party publication, The Conservative.

Speaking in 2012 about same-sex marriage, Fierravanti-Wells said that many LGBT people do not "even intend on staying in a monogamous relationship". She is one of twelve senators who voted against what became the Marriage Amendment (Definition and Religious Freedoms) Act 2017.

In November 2021, Fierravanti-Wells was one of five Liberal-aligned senators who voted against the government in support of One Nation’s COVID-19 Vaccination Status (Prevention of Discrimination) Bill 2021.

=== Departure ===
Fierravanti-Wells' senate term would expire in June 2022, along with those of two other Liberal senators. She sought Liberal Party preselection for the 2022 Australian federal election to continue to represent New South Wales. She nominated for the winnable positions (the first two) on the party's Senate ticket. She was defeated by both other senators in the ballot held at the state council meeting on 26 March 2022. Fierravanti-Wells later clarified via Twitter and an open letter to party members that she did not nominate for the unwinnable positions, and so she would not appear on the Senate ticket and would not be a candidate at the election.

A few days later, on 29 March 2022, she spoke in parliament, criticising Scott Morrison and the pre-selection process in the New South Wales division of the Liberal Party.

Fierravanti-Wells's term expired on 30 June 2022.

== Personal life ==
Fierravanti-Wells is married to John Wells, a former Royal Australian Navy officer who commanded HMAS Tobruk during the 1990s. They married in 1990 at the naval base HMAS Watson. In 2013, when she first became a parliamentary secretary, she reported that they own a property in Umbria, Italy.

== Notes ==
Parliament of Australia
Preceded by John Tierney	Senator for New South Wales; 2005–2022	Incumbent
Political offices
Preceded by Steven Ciobo	Minister for International Development and the Pacific; 2016–2018	Incumbent
New ministerial post	Assistant Minister for Multicultural Affairs; 2015–2016	Succeeded by Craig Laundy
