= Bill Cope (academic) =

William Cope, known as Bill Cope, is an Australian academic, author and educational theorist who was a research professor in the Department of Educational Policy Studies at the University of Illinois, Urbana-Champaign, He has also been the Managing Director of Common Ground Publishing at the university.

== Early life and education ==
Cope completed his Bachelor of Arts with first class honours in History in 1979 at Macquarie University. He received a Commonwealth Postgraduate Research Scholarship from 1980 to 1982. He completed his Ph.D., at Macquarie University in 1987. Cope was a visiting fellow in the Graduate School of Arts and Sciences and Graduate School of Education at Harvard University from January to June 1991.

== Career ==
In 1984 Cope became the director of Common Ground Publishing.

He worked as senior research fellow in the Centre for Multicultural Studies at the University of Wollongong between 1984 and 1991. Following this, he was the Director for the Centre for Workplace Communication and Culture, University of Technology, Sydney and James Cook University of North Queensland from 1993 to 1995 and 1996 to 1997. From 1995 to 1996, he was the First Assistant Secretary and Director of the Office of Multicultural Affairs in the Department of the Prime Minister and Cabinet for the Australian Government. During this period he was also Director of the Bureau of Immigration, Multicultural and Population Research in the Department of Immigration and Multicultural Affairs.

In 1998, Cope was one of the founders of the Unity Party.

His research interests include theories and practices of pedagogy, cultural and linguistic diversity, and new technologies of representation and communication.

== Author ==
Cope is the author or co-author of numerous books, research reports, articles and book chapters. These include:

- Cope, Bill and Angus Phillips (eds.), The Future of the Academic Journal, Chandos Publishing, Oxford, UK, 2009.
- Kalantzis, Mary and Bill Cope, New Learning: Elements of a Science of Education, Cambridge University Press, 2008.
- Cope, Bill and Angus Phillips (eds.), The Future of the Book in the Digital Age, Chandos Publishing, Oxford, UK, 2006.
- Kalantzis, Mary, Bill Cope, and the Learning by Design Project Group, Learning by Design, Victorian Schools Innovation Commission, Melbourne, 2005.
- Kalantzis, Mary, Gella Varnava-Skoura and Bill Cope (eds), Learning for the Future: New Worlds, New Literacies, New Learning, New People, Common Ground, Melbourne, 2002.
- Kalantzis, Mary and Bill Cope (eds), Reconciliation, Multiculturalism, Identities: Difficult Dialogues, Sensible Solutions, Common Ground, Melbourne, 2001.
- Kalantzis, Mary and Bill Cope (eds), Transformations in Language and Learning: Perspectives on Multiliteracies, Common Ground, Melbourne, 2001.
- Cope, Bill and Mary Kalantzis, A Place in the Sun: Re-creating the Australian Way of Life, Harper Collins, Sydney, 2000.
- Cope, Bill and Mary Kalantzis (eds), Multiliteracies: Literacy Learning and the Design of Social Futures, Routledge, London, 2000.
- Cope, Bill and Mary Kalantzis, Productive Diversity: A New, Australian Approach to Work and Management, Pluto Press, Sydney, 1997.
- Kalantzis, Mary, Bill Cope, and Peter Wignell, The Language of Social Studies: Using Texts of Society and Culture in the Primary School, Macmillan, Sydney, 1994.
- Cope, Bill and Mary Kalantzis (eds), The Powers of Literacy: A Genre Approach to Teaching Writing, Falmer Press, London, and University of Pittsburgh Press, Pennsylvania, 1993.
- Castles, Stephen, Bill Cope, Mary Kalantzis and Michael Morrissey, Mistaken Identity: Multiculturalism and the Demise of Nationalism in Australia, Pluto Press, Sydney and London, 1988.
- Kalantzis, Mary, Bill Cope, Greg Noble and Scott Poynting, Cultures of Schooling: Pedagogies for Cultural Difference and Social Access, The Falmer Press, London, 1991.
- Kalantzis, Mary, Bill Cope and Diana Slade, Minority Languages and Dominant Culture: Issues of Education, Assessment and Social Equity, The Falmer Press, London, 1989.
- Kalantzis, Mary and Bill Cope, Just Spaghetti and Polka? An Introduction to Australian Multicultural Education, Common Ground, Sydney, 1981.
