= 1998 Australian federal election =

- 3 October 1998 (Note: The election in the seat of Newcastle was deferred to 21 November 1998.)

All 148 seats in the House of Representatives 75 seats were needed for a majority 40 (of the 76) seats in the Senate
- Opinion polls
- Registered: 12,154,050 ▲3.52%
- Turnout: 11,545,201 (94.99%) (▼0.78 pp)
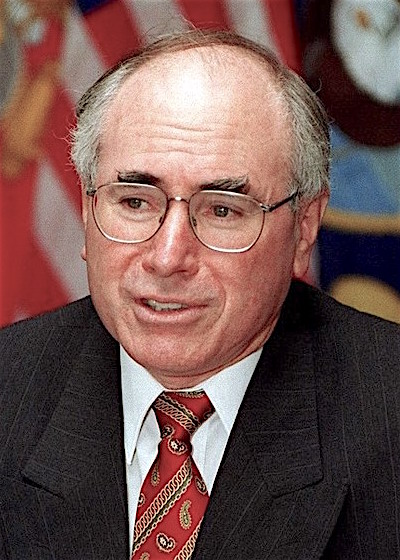

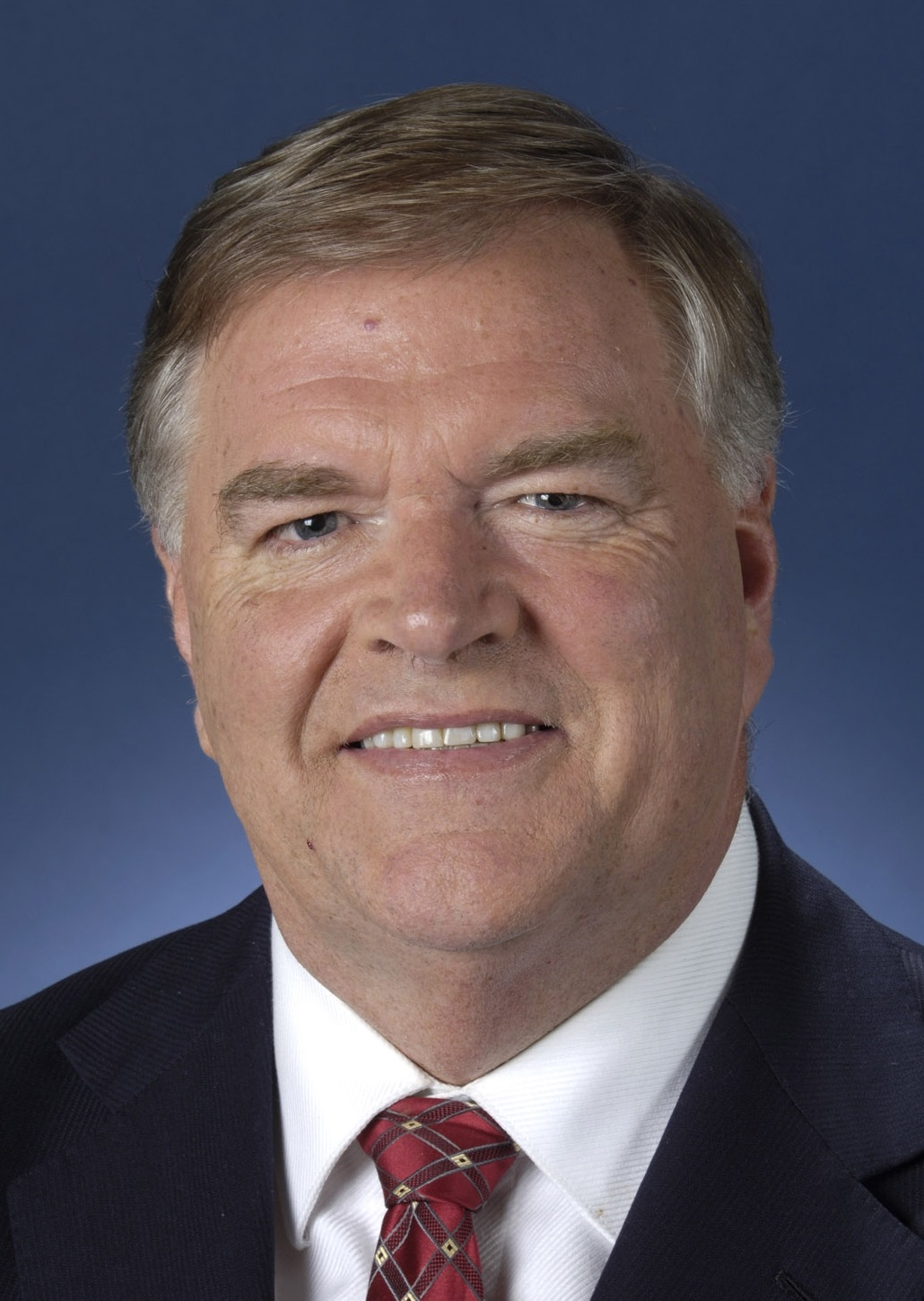
| | First party | Second party |
|---|---|---|
| Leader | John Howard | Kim Beazley |
| Party | Coalition | Labor |
| Leader since | 30 January 1995 | 19 March 1996 |
| Leader's seat | Bennelong (NSW) | Brand (WA) |
| Last election | 94 seats | 49 seats |
| Seats before | 94 | 49 |
| Seats won | 80 | 67 |
| Seat change | ▼14 | ▲18 |
| Primary vote | 4,388,809 | 4,454,306 |
| Percentage | 39.51% | 40.10% |
| Swing | ▼7.73% | ▲1.34% |
| TPP | 49.02% | 50.98% |
| TPP swing | ▼4.61 | ▲4.61 |
- Results by division for the House of Representatives, shaded by winning party's margin of victory.
Prime Minister before election
John Howard
Liberal/National coalition
Subsequent Prime Minister
John Howard
Liberal/National coalition

A federal election was held on 3 October 1998 to elect members of the 39th Parliament of Australia. All 148 seats of the House of Representatives and 40 seats of the 76 seat Senate were up for election. The incumbent centre-right Liberal/National Coalition government led by Prime Minister John Howard of the Liberal Party and coalition partner Tim Fischer of the National Party defeated the centre-left Australian Labor Party opposition led by Opposition Leader Kim Beazley, despite losing the nationwide popular and two-party preferred vote. However, the Australian Labor Party gained seats compared to the previous election.

Entering parliament at this election were future Prime Ministers Kevin Rudd and Julia Gillard, future Liberal deputy leader and future Minister of Foreign Affairs Julie Bishop, future Deputy Prime Minister Wayne Swan and future Speaker Anna Burke.

== Background ==
The election returned the Member of the House of Representatives for its 1998–2001 term and half of Australia's senators, who then served in the 1999–2002 Senate.

Despite winning almost 51 percent of the two-party-preferred vote and regaining much of what it had lost in its severe defeat of two years earlier, Labor fell short of forming government. The government was re-elected with 49.02% of the two-party-preferred vote, compared to 50.98% for the Australian Labor Party, the largest difference of six election results where the winner did not gain a two-party preferred majority, since 2PP results first estimated from 1937.

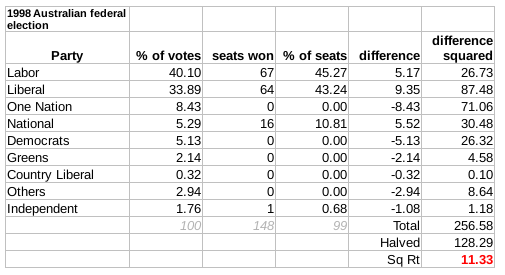
The Gallagher Index result was 11.33.

The election on 3 October 1998 was held six months earlier than required by the Constitution. Prime Minister John Howard made the announcement following the launch of the coalition's Goods and Services Tax (GST) policy launch and a five-week advertising campaign. The ensuing election was almost entirely dominated by the proposed 10% GST and proposed income tax cuts. This election was not the first to be centred on a GST; the 1993 election saw the Keating Labor government re-elected after a proposal by then Opposition leader John Hewson to introduce a 15% GST.

During the election the Australia/Israel & Jewish Affairs Council (AIJAC) lobbied for the Coalition to put One Nation last in preferences.

In reaction to One Nation's policies, the other significant parties all agreed to preference against One Nation. One Nation lost its lone house seat when founder and leader Pauline Hanson lost on preferences to Liberal candidate Cameron Thompson in the Queensland electorate of Blair. In Queensland, One Nation polled 14.83% of the Senate vote, sufficient to elect one senator without the need for preferences. The seat initially went to Heather Hill, but she was subsequently disqualified under Section 44 of the Constitution, and replaced by Len Harris.

The election-eve Newspoll reported Labor on a 53 percent two-party-preferred vote.

On election night of 3 October, the exit poll showed Labor on a 53 percent two-party-preferred vote. Labor made the single biggest gain by an Opposition party following an election defeat; the Coalition's majority was cut from 40 to 12. It was only when the first returns trickled in from Western Australia that the Coalition was assured of another term. The swing across all states would have normally been sufficient for a change of government, but the uneven nature of the swing left Kim Beazley eight seats short of becoming prime minister. The uneven nature of the swing saw Labor getting huge swings in seats that they held prior to the election but not enough in seats needed to gain government.

The election for the division of Newcastle was deferred as the Democrats candidate died on 1 October, two days before the federal election. A supplementary election was held on 21 November, with Labor holding the seat.

== Results ==
=== House of Representatives results ===
Government (80) Coalition Liberal (64) National (16) Opposition (67) Labor (67) Crossbench (1) Independent (1)

House of Reps (IRV) – 1998–2001 – Turnout 94.99% (CV) — Informal 3.78%
| Party | Votes | % | Swing | Seats | Change |
| Labor | 4,454,306 | 40.10 | +1.34 | 67 | ▲18 |
| Liberal | 3,764,707 | 33.89 | −4.80 | 64 | ▼11 |
| National | 588,088 | 5.29 | −2.91 | 16 | ▼2 |
| Country Liberal | 36,014 | 0.32 | −0.03 | 0 | ▼1 |
| Liberal/National Coalition | 4,388,809 | 39.51 | -7.74 | 80 | ▼14 |
| One Nation | 936,621 | 8.43 | * | | |
| Democrats | 569,875 | 5.13 | −1.63 | | |
| Greens (Note: Australian Greens includes Greens Western Australia.) | 290,709 | 2.62 | −0.30 | | |
| Independents (Note: Pauline Hanson has been counted as an independent for the 1996 election. She had been disendorsed as the Liberal candidate and ran as an independent, but she remained a Liberal on the ballot paper.) | 195,180 | 1.76 | −0.51 | 1 | ▼4 |
| Others | 273,503 | 2.46 | | | |
| Total | 11,109,063 | | | 148 | |
Two-party-preferred vote
| Liberal/National coalition | 5,413,431 | 49.02 | −4.61 | 80 | ▼14 |
| Labor | 5,630,409 | 50.98 | +4.61 | 67 | ▲18 |
| Invalid/blank votes | 436,138 | 3.78 | | | |
| Turnout | 11,545,201 | 95.0 | | | |
| Registered voters | 12,154,050 | | | | |
Source: Federal Elections 1998

Popular vote
| Labor | 40.10% |
| Liberal | 33.89% |
| One Nation | 8.43% |
| National | 5.29% |
| Democrats | 5.13% |
| Greens | 2.14% |
| CLP | 0.32% |
| Independents | 1.76% |
| Other | 2.94% |

Two-party-preferred vote
| Labor | 50.98% |
| Coalition | 49.02% |

Parliament seats
| Coalition | 54.05% |
| Labor | 45.27% |
| Independents | 0.68% |

=== Senate results ===
Government (35) Coalition Liberal (31) National (3) CLP (1) Opposition (29) Labor (29) Crossbench (12) Democrats (9) Greens (1) One Nation (1) Independent (1)

Senate (STV GV) — 1999–2002—Turnout 95.34% (CV) — Informal 3.24%
| Party | Votes | % | Swing | Seats won | Seats | Change |
|---|---|---|---|---|---|---|
| Labor | 4,182,963 | 37.31 | +1.16 | 17 | 29 | Steady |
| Liberal/National (Joint Ticket) | 2,452,407 | 21.87 | −2.62 | 5 | | |
| Liberal | 1,528,730 | 13.63 | −2.61 | 11 | 31 | Steady |
| National | 208,536 | 1.86 | −1.01 | 0 | 3 | ▼2 |
| Country Liberal | 36,063 | 0.32 | −0.05 | 1 | 1 | Steady |
| Liberal–National coalition | 4,225,673 | 37.70 | −6.27 | 17 | 35 | ▼2 |
| One Nation | 1,007,439 | 8.99 | * | 1 | 1 | ▲1 |
| Democrats | 947,940 | 8.45 | −2.37 | 4 | 9 | ▲2 |
| Australian Greens | 305,058 | 2.72 | −0.45 | 0 | 1 | ▼1 |
| Harradine Group | 24,254 | 0.22 | −0.08 | 1 | 1 | Steady |
| Others | 507,221 | 4.5 | | | | |
| Total | 11,211,903 | | | 40 | 76 | |
| Invalid/blank votes | 375,181 | 3.2 | | | | |
| Turnout | 11,584,909 | 95.3 | | | | |
| Registered voters | 12,154,050 | | | | | |
Source: AEC Election 2001

== House of Representatives preference flows ==
- The Nationals had candidates in 13 seats where three-cornered-contests existed, with 88.89% of preferences favouring the Liberal Party.
- One Nation contested 135 electorates with preferences slightly favouring the Liberal/National Coalition (53.66%)
- The Democrats contested 144 electorates with preferences slightly favouring Labor (56.72%)
- The Greens contested 120 electorates with preferences strongly favouring Labor (73.28%)

== Seats changing hands ==
| Seat | Pre-1998 | | | Swing | Post-1998 | | |
| Seat | Party | Member | Margin | Swing | Margin | Member | Party |
|---|---|---|---|---|---|---|---|
| Bass, Tas | Liberal | Warwick Smith | 4.57 | 4.63 | 0.06 | Michelle O'Byrne | Labor |
| Bendigo, Vic | Liberal | Bruce Reid | 0.88 | 4.35 | 3.47 | Steve Gibbons | Labor |
| Bowman, Qld | Liberal | Andrea West | 0.89 | 4.18 | 3.29 | Con Sciacca | Labor |
| Braddon, Tas | Liberal | Chris Miles | 5.69 | 10.02 | 4.33 | Sid Sidebottom | Labor |
| Canning, WA | Liberal | Ricky Johnston | 1.64 | 5.16 | 3.52 | Jane Gerick | Labor |
| Capricornia, Qld | National | Paul Marek | 3.46 | 8.75 | 5.29 | Kirsten Livermore | Labor |
| Chisholm, Vic | Liberal | Michael Wooldridge | 2.60 | 4.67 | 2.07 | Anna Burke | Labor |
| Cowan, WA | Liberal | Richard Evans | 4.06 | 7.62 | 3.56 | Graham Edwards | Labor |
| Curtin, WA | Independent | Allan Rocher | 7.28 | N/A (Note: Allan Rocher, Graeme Campbell and Paul Filing were not in the final two candidates for their seats; the second figures are against Labor.) | 13.28 | Julie Bishop | Liberal |
| Dickson, Qld | Liberal | Tony Smith (Note: Tony Smith contested his seat as an independent. The figures shown are against Labor.) | 3.90 | 4.02 | 0.12 | Cheryl Kernot | Labor |
| Griffith, Qld | Liberal | Graeme McDougall | 1.50 | 3.93 | 2.43 | Kevin Rudd | Labor |
| Hume, NSW | National | John Sharp | 4.35 | 3.71 | 8.06 | Alby Schultz | Liberal |
| Kalgoorlie, WA | Independent | Graeme Campbell | 10.35 | N/A | 2.10 | Barry Haase | Liberal |
| Kingston, SA | Liberal | Susan Jeanes | 2.01 | 2.48 | 0.47 | David Cox | Labor |
| Lilley, Qld | Liberal | Elizabeth Grace | 0.80 | 3.93 | 3.13 | Wayne Swan | Labor |
| Lowe, NSW | Liberal | Paul Zammit (Note: Paul Zammit contested his seat as an independent. The figures shown are against Liberal.) | 2.46 | 7.09 | 4.63 | John Murphy | Labor |
| McMillan, Vic | Liberal | Russell Broadbent | 2.07 | 2.64 | 0.57 | Christian Zahra | Labor |
| Moore, WA | Independent | Paul Filing | 13.28 | N/A | 4.13 | Mal Washer | Liberal |
| Northern Territory, NT | Country Liberal | Nick Dondas | 0.37 | 0.94 | 0.57 | Warren Snowdon | Labor |
| Paterson, NSW | Liberal | Bob Baldwin | 0.43 | 1.65 | 1.22 | Bob Horne | Labor |
| Stirling, WA | Liberal | Eoin Cameron | 3.22 | 4.26 | 1.04 | Jann McFarlane | Labor |
| Swan, WA | Liberal | Don Randall | 3.63 | 6.33 | 2.70 | Kim Wilkie | Labor |

- The Labor Party retained the seat of Oxley (Qld) which became Labor-held in the redistribution.

== Opinion polling ==
In the lead-up to the election, a number of polling companies conducted opinion polls for various news organisations. These polls collected data on parties' primary vote, leaders' favourability, and contained an estimation of the two-party-preferred lead.

=== Voting intention ===
==== House of Representatives ====
| Date | Firm | Sample size | Primary vote | | | | | | TPP vote | |
| Date | Firm | Sample size | L/NP | ALP | DEM | GRN | ONP | OTH | L/NP | ALP |
|---|---|---|---|---|---|---|---|---|---|---|
| 3 Oct 1998 | 1998 federal election | | 39.5% | 40.1% | 5.1% | 2.6% | 8.4% | 4.2% | 49.0% | 51.0% |
| 2 Oct 1998 | Newspoll | —N/a | 40% | 44% | —N/a | —N/a | —N/a | —N/a | 47% | 53% |
| 1 Oct 1998 | Nielsen | —N/a | 42% | 40% | 5% | 2% | 8% | —N/a | 50% | 50% |
| 1 Oct 1998 | Morgan | —N/a | 44.5% | 44.5% | —N/a | —N/a | —N/a | —N/a | —N/a | —N/a |
| 29 Sep 1998 | Newspoll | —N/a | 43% | 42% | —N/a | —N/a | 7% | 8% | 49% | 51% |
| 22 – 23 Sep 1998 | Nielsen | —N/a | 41% | 43% | 5% | —N/a | 7% | 3% | 48% | 52% |
| 22 Sep 1998 | Newspoll | —N/a | 42% | 43% | —N/a | —N/a | 6% | 9% | 48% | 52% |
| 22 Sep 1998 | ARS | —N/a | 41% | 36% | —N/a | —N/a | —N/a | —N/a | —N/a | —N/a |
| 18 Sep 1998 | Nielsen | —N/a | 42% | 43% | 3% | —N/a | 8% | —N/a | —N/a | —N/a |
| 15 Sep 1998 | ARS | 550 | 44% | 34% | 12% | —N/a | 6% | —N/a | 47% | 42% |
| 15 Sep 1998 | Newspoll | —N/a | 42% | 44% | —N/a | —N/a | —N/a | —N/a | 47% | 53% |
| 8 Sep 1998 | Newspoll | —N/a | 41.5% | 41.5% | —N/a | —N/a | 7.5% | 9.5% | 48.5% | 51.5% |
| 2 Sep 1998 | Newspoll | —N/a | 40% | 40% | —N/a | —N/a | 10% | 10% | —N/a | —N/a |
| 2 Mar 1996 | 1996 federal election | | 47.3% | 38.8% | 6.8% | 2.9% | — | 4.3% | 53.6% | 46.4% |

==== Senate ====
| Date | Firm | Sample size | Primary vote | | | | | |
| Date | Firm | Sample size | L/NP | ALP | DEM | GRN | ONP | OTH |
|---|---|---|---|---|---|---|---|---|
| 3 Oct 1998 | 1998 federal election | | 37.7% | 37.3% | 8.5% | 2.7% | 9.0% | 4.7% |
| 29 Sep 1998 | Nielsen | —N/a | —N/a | —N/a | 15% | —N/a | —N/a | —N/a |
| 18 Sep 1998 | Nielsen | —N/a | —N/a | —N/a | 9% | —N/a | 8% | —N/a |
| 1 Sep 1998 | Nielsen | —N/a | —N/a | —N/a | 8.8% | —N/a | —N/a | —N/a |
| 2 Mar 1996 | 1996 federal election | | 44.0% | 36.2% | 10.8% | 3.2% | — | 5.9% |

=== Individual seat polling ===
==== Blair ====
| Date | Firm | Sample size | Primary vote | | | | | | | TCP vote | |
| Date | Firm | Sample size | ONP | ALP | LIB | NAT | DEM | GRN | OTH | LIB | ONP |
|---|---|---|---|---|---|---|---|---|---|---|---|
| 3 Oct 1998 | 1998 federal election | | 36.0% | 25.3% | 21.3% | 10.3% | 3.6% | 1.8% | 1.4% | 53.4% | 46.6% |
| 12 Sep 1998 | Unnamed | —N/a | 35% | 28% | 19% | 11% | —N/a | —N/a | —N/a | —N/a | —N/a |
| 7 Sep 1998 | Unnamed | —N/a | 31% | 21% | 19% | 14% | —N/a | —N/a | —N/a | —N/a | —N/a |
| 1998 | Creation of the Division of Blair announced | | | | | | | | | | |

==== Brand ====
| Date | Firm | Sample size | Primary vote | | | | | | TPP vote | |
| Date | Firm | Sample size | ALP | LIB | GRN | DEM | ONP | OTH | ALP | LIB |
|---|---|---|---|---|---|---|---|---|---|---|
| 3 Oct 1998 | 1998 federal election | | 52.0% | 27.7% | 2.9% | 2.3% | 11.9% | 3.2% | 62.3% | 37.7% |
| 5 Sep 1998 | Nielson | —N/a | 53% | —N/a | —N/a | —N/a | —N/a | —N/a | —N/a | —N/a |
| 2 Mar 1996 | 1996 federal election | | 43.9% | 42.6% | 4.2% | 3.5% | — | 5.9% | 50.2% | 49.8% |

== See also ==
- Candidates of the 1998 Australian federal election
- Members of the Australian House of Representatives, 1998–2001
- Members of the Australian Senate, 1999–2002
