= Electoral results for the Division of Swan =

Australian division election results

This is a list of electoral results for the Division of Swan in Australian federal elections from the division's creation in 1901 until the present.

== Members ==
Member	Party	Term
Sir John Forrest	Protectionist	1901–1906
Sir John Forrest	Western Australian	1906–1909
Sir John Forrest	Liberal	1909–1917
Sir John Forrest	Nationalist	1917–1918
Edwin Corboy	Labor	1918 by–1919
John Prowse	Farmers and Settlers Association/Country	1919–1922
Henry Gregory	Country	1922–1940
Thomas Marwick	Country	1940 by–1943
Don Mountjoy	Labor	1943–1946
Len Hamilton	Country	1946–1949
Bill Grayden	Liberal	1949–1954
Harry Webb	Labor	1954–1955
Richard Cleaver	Liberal	1955–1969
Adrian Bennett	Labor	1969–1975
John Martyr	Liberal	1975–1980
Kim Beazley	Labor	1980–1996
Don Randall	Liberal	1996–1998
Kim Wilkie	Labor	1998–2007
Steve Irons	Liberal	2007–2022
Zaneta Mascarenhas	Labor	2022–present

== Election results ==
=== Elections in the 2020s ===
==== 2025 ====
2025 Australian federal election: Swan
Party	Candidate	Votes	%	±%
Greens	Clint Uink			
One Nation	Michael Halley			
Legalise Cannabis	Shelley Leech			
Liberal	Mic Fels			
Christians	Mark Staer			
Labor	Zaneta Mascarenhas			
Total formal votes				
Informal votes				
Turnout				

==== 2022 ====
2022 Australian federal election: Swan
Party	Candidate	Votes	%	±%
Labor	Zaneta Mascarenhas	39,082	39.07	+6.17
Liberal	Kristy McSweeney	32,096	32.08	−12.65
Greens	Clint Uink	14,861	14.86	+2.86
United Australia	Paul Hilton	2,637	2.64	+0.81
One Nation	Peter Hallifax	2,544	2.54	−0.33
Animal Justice	Timothy Green	2,214	2.21	+0.89
Western Australia	Rod Bradley	2,059	2.06	+0.70
Christians	Dena Gower	1,930	1.93	+0.20
Liberal Democrats	Matthew Thompson	1,821	1.82	+1.82
Federation	Carl Pallier	792	0.79	+0.79
Total formal votes		100,036	94.75	+0.59
Informal votes		5,545	5.25	−0.59
Turnout		105,581	87.12	−1.73
Two-party-preferred result
Labor	Zaneta Mascarenhas	58,796	58.77	+11.99
Liberal	Kristy McSweeney	41,240	41.23	−11.99
Labor gain from Liberal		Swing	+11.99	

Alluvial diagram for preference flows in the seat of Swan in the 2022 federal election. indicates at what stage the winning candidate had over 50% of the votes and was declared the winner.

=== Elections in the 2010s ===
==== 2019 ====
2019 Australian federal election: Swan
Party	Candidate	Votes	%	±%
Liberal	Steve Irons	37,591	44.68	−3.50
Labor	Hannah Beazley	27,953	33.22	+0.21
Greens	Liberty Cramer	10,372	12.33	−2.69
One Nation	Tshung-Hui Chang	2,038	2.42	+2.42
United Australia	Peter McLernon	1,483	1.76	+1.76
Christians	Steve Klomp	1,450	1.72	−2.07
Animal Justice	Virginia Thomas-Wurth	1,302	1.55	+1.55
Western Australia	Sharron Hawkins Zeeb	1,102	1.31	+1.31
Conservative National	Carmel Addink	601	0.71	+0.71
Australia First	Michael Chehoff	251	0.30	+0.30
Total formal votes		84,143	94.19	−2.18
Informal votes		5,190	5.81	+2.18
Turnout		89,333	88.64	+1.80
Two-party-preferred result
Liberal	Steve Irons	44,357	52.72	−0.87
Labor	Hannah Beazley	39,786	47.28	+0.87
Liberal hold		Swing	−0.87	

==== 2016 ====
2016 Australian federal election: Swan
Party	Candidate	Votes	%	±%
Liberal	Steve Irons	39,220	48.18	−1.43
Labor	Tammy Solonec	26,869	33.01	+2.97
Greens	Sarah Nielsen-Harvey	12,227	15.02	+3.79
Christians	Steve Klomp	3,086	3.79	+2.06
Total formal votes		81,402	96.37	+1.96
Informal votes		3,062	3.63	−1.96
Turnout		84,464	86.84	−3.55
Two-party-preferred result
Liberal	Steve Irons	43,625	53.59	−3.75
Labor	Tammy Solonec	37,777	46.41	+3.75
Liberal hold		Swing	−3.75	

==== 2013 ====
2013 Australian federal election: Swan
Party	Candidate	Votes	%	±%
Liberal	Steve Irons	39,972	48.86	+2.35
Labor	John Bissett	25,037	30.60	−4.68
Greens	Gerard Siero	9,446	11.55	−0.26
Palmer United	Kenneth Duncan	3,463	4.23	+4.23
Christians	Steve Klomp	1,465	1.79	+1.79
Family First	Moyna Rapp	797	0.97	−0.26
Protectionist	Troy Ellis	718	0.88	+0.88
Rise Up Australia	Paul Davies	488	0.60	+0.60
Katter's Australian	Noel Avery	421	0.51	+0.51
Total formal votes		81,807	94.37	−0.73
Informal votes		4,879	5.63	+0.73
Turnout		86,686	90.97	−1.00
Two-party-preferred result
Liberal	Steve Irons	46,246	56.53	+4.00
Labor	John Bissett	35,561	43.47	−4.00
Liberal hold		Swing	+4.00	

==== 2010 ====
2010 Australian federal election: Swan
Party	Candidate	Votes	%	±%
Liberal	Steve Irons	36,951	46.51	+2.76
Labor	Tim Hammond	28,023	35.28	−5.69
Greens	Rebecca Leighton	9,380	11.81	+1.69
Sex Party	Bret Treasure	2,060	2.59	+2.59
Christian Democrats	Steve Klomp	1,646	2.07	+0.30
Family First	Barry Drennan	981	1.23	+0.38
Socialist Equality	Joe Lopez	398	0.50	+0.30
Total formal votes		79,439	95.10	−0.36
Informal votes		4,089	4.90	+0.36
Turnout		83,528	92.03	−0.97
Two-party-preferred result
Liberal	Steve Irons	41,729	52.53	+2.80
Labor	Tim Hammond	37,710	47.47	−2.80
Liberal notional gain from Labor		Swing	+2.80	

=== Elections in the 2000s ===
==== 2007 ====
2007 Australian federal election: Swan
Party	Candidate	Votes	%	±%
Liberal	Steve Irons	32,183	44.28	+0.14
Labor	Kim Wilkie	29,544	40.65	+0.73
Greens	Kim Lisson	7,365	10.13	+1.84
Christian Democrats	Tasman Gilbert	1,210	1.66	−0.09
Independent	Linda Ross	656	0.90	+0.90
One Nation	Joy Harris	647	0.89	−0.89
Family First	Damon Fowler	579	0.80	−0.04
Liberty & Democracy	Mark Dixon	243	0.33	+0.33
Socialist Equality	Joe Lopez	157	0.22	+0.22
Citizens Electoral Council	Norman Gay	92	0.13	−0.16
Total formal votes		72,676	95.41	+0.87
Informal votes		3,497	4.59	−0.87
Turnout		76,173	93.22	+1.04
Two-party-preferred result
Liberal	Steve Irons	36,420	50.11	+0.19
Labor	Kim Wilkie	36,256	49.89	−0.19
Liberal gain from Labor		Swing	+0.19	

==== 2004 ====
2004 Australian federal election: Swan
Party	Candidate	Votes	%	±%
Liberal	Andrew Murfin	30,598	44.14	+5.16
Labor	Kim Wilkie	27,675	39.92	−1.35
Greens	Dave Fort	5,745	8.29	+2.41
One Nation	Ted Vermeer	1,232	1.78	−2.87
Christian Democrats	Gwen Hamence	1,214	1.75	+0.15
Democrats	Mark Reynolds	1,133	1.63	−4.08
Independent	Teresa van Lieshout	947	1.37	+1.37
Family First	Peter Greaves	582	0.84	+0.84
Citizens Electoral Council	Azmi Johari	198	0.29	−0.08
Total formal votes		69,324	94.54	−0.59
Informal votes		4,006	5.46	+0.59
Turnout		73,330	92.18	−2.05
Two-party-preferred result
Labor	Kim Wilkie	34,714	50.08	−1.96
Liberal	Andrew Murfin	34,610	49.92	+1.96
Labor hold		Swing	−1.96	

==== 2001 ====
2001 Australian federal election: Swan
Party	Candidate	Votes	%	±%
Labor	Kim Wilkie	29,220	41.27	+1.13
Liberal	Bev Brennan	27,597	38.98	−0.55
Greens	Elena Jeffreys	4,163	5.88	+0.70
Democrats	Paul McCutcheon	4,043	5.71	+0.85
One Nation	Sandra Vinciullo	3,292	4.65	−3.26
Christian Democrats	Colleen Tapley	1,130	1.60	+0.25
Curtin Labor Alliance	Simon Makin	1,096	1.55	+1.55
Citizens Electoral Council	Brian Smith	262	0.37	−0.41
Total formal votes		70,803	95.13	−0.58
Informal votes		3,628	4.87	+0.58
Turnout		74,431	94.78	
Two-party-preferred result
Labor	Kim Wilkie	36,844	52.04	−0.71
Liberal	Bev Brennan	33,959	47.96	+0.71
Labor hold		Swing	−0.71	

=== Elections in the 1990s ===
==== 1998 ====
1998 Australian federal election: Swan
Party	Candidate	Votes	%	±%
Labor	Kim Wilkie	30,481	40.09	+3.10
Liberal	Don Randall	29,848	39.26	−3.55
One Nation	Richard Birchall	6,278	8.26	+8.26
Greens	Juanita Miller	3,892	5.12	+0.27
Democrats	Tim Fraser	3,720	4.89	−0.88
Christian Democrats	Brett Crook	1,018	1.34	+1.34
Citizens Electoral Council	Malcolm Talbot	584	0.77	+0.77
Natural Law	Elspeth Clairs	210	0.28	−0.05
Total formal votes		76,031	95.71	−0.68
Informal votes		3,404	4.29	+0.68
Turnout		79,435	95.05	+0.52
Two-party-preferred result
Labor	Kim Wilkie	40,067	52.70	+6.33
Liberal	Don Randall	35,964	47.30	−6.33
Labor gain from Liberal		Swing	+6.33	

==== 1996 ====
1996 Australian federal election: Swan
Party	Candidate	Votes	%	±%
Liberal	Don Randall	27,974	42.34	−2.87
Labor	Jane Saunders	24,349	36.86	−7.15
Independent	Bryan Hilbert	6,274	9.50	+9.50
Democrats	Norm Kelly	3,574	5.41	+2.85
Greens	Mingli Wanjurri-Nungala	3,086	4.67	−0.49
Independent	John Tucak	573	0.87	+0.87
Natural Law	Elspeth Clairs	235	0.36	−0.03
Total formal votes		66,065	96.45	−0.60
Informal votes		2,435	3.55	+0.60
Turnout		68,500	94.53	−0.98
Two-party-preferred result
Liberal	Don Randall	35,239	53.71	+3.93
Labor	Jane Saunders	30,372	46.29	−3.93
Liberal gain from Labor		Swing	+3.93	

==== 1993 ====
1993 Australian federal election: Swan
Party	Candidate	Votes	%	±%
Liberal	Bryan Hilbert	30,565	45.22	+7.60
Labor	Kim Beazley	29,750	44.01	+3.46
Greens	Andrew Thomson	3,492	5.17	−2.10
Democrats	Don Millar	1,733	2.56	−5.45
Independent	Andrew Caminschi	807	1.19	+1.19
Independent	Luke Garswood	576	0.85	+0.85
Independent	Isobel Weir	415	0.61	+0.61
Natural Law	Anne Leishman	260	0.38	+0.38
Total formal votes		67,598	97.05	+1.40
Informal votes		2,056	2.95	−1.40
Turnout		69,654	95.51	
Two-party-preferred result
Labor	Kim Beazley	33,917	50.22	−2.13
Liberal	Bryan Hilbert	33,623	49.78	+2.13
Labor hold		Swing	−2.13	

==== 1990 ====
1990 Australian federal election: Swan
Party	Candidate	Votes	%	±%
Labor	Kim Beazley	26,674	40.5	−14.7
Liberal	Peter Kirwan	24,743	37.6	+1.7
Democrats	Alan Needham	5,274	8.0	+8.0
Greens	Dee Margetts	4,777	7.3	+7.3
Grey Power	Mike Hutton	2,514	3.8	+3.8
Independent	Patrick Donovan	753	1.1	+1.1
Democratic Socialist	Frank Noakes	500	0.8	+0.8
Independent	Erica Gamble	412	0.6	+0.6
Independent	Paul Auguston	134	0.2	+0.2
Total formal votes		65,781	95.6	
Informal votes		2,992	4.4	
Turnout		68,773	94.8	
Two-party-preferred result
Labor	Kim Beazley	34,351	52.4	−6.2
Liberal	Peter Kirwan	31,265	47.6	+6.2
Labor hold		Swing	−6.2	

=== Elections in the 1980s ===
==== 1987 ====
1987 Australian federal election: Swan
Party	Candidate	Votes	%	±%
Labor	Kim Beazley	32,201	54.6	+0.4
Liberal	Harry Klapp	21,555	36.5	−4.2
National	Adelia Bernard	2,750	4.7	+4.7
Independent	Georgina Motion	2,518	4.3	+4.3
Total formal votes		59,024	93.1	
Informal votes		4,348	6.9	
Turnout		63,372	92.7	
Two-party-preferred result
Labor	Kim Beazley	34,220	58.0	+1.0
Liberal	Harry Klapp	24,804	42.0	−1.0
Labor hold		Swing	+1.0	

==== 1984 ====
1984 Australian federal election: Swan
Party	Candidate	Votes	%	±%
Labor	Kim Beazley	32,376	54.2	−4.4
Liberal	Frank Hayes	24,305	40.7	+4.6
Democrats	Linda Mottram	3,077	5.1	+0.8
Total formal votes		59,758	91.8	
Informal votes		5,352	8.2	
Turnout		65,110	93.2	
Two-party-preferred result
Labor	Kim Beazley	34,044	57.0	−5.1
Liberal	Frank Hayes	25,714	43.0	+5.1
Labor hold		Swing	−5.1	

==== 1983 ====
1983 Australian federal election: Swan
Party	Candidate	Votes	%	±%
Labor	Kim Beazley	38,908	62.7	+9.4
Liberal	Jeffrey Roberts	19,825	32.0	−8.1
Democrats	Kevin Trent	2,662	4.3	−1.1
Socialist Workers	Linda Mere	621	1.0	−0.2
Total formal votes		62,016	97.8	
Informal votes		1,391	2.2	
Turnout		63,407	92.9	
Two-party-preferred result
Labor	Kim Beazley		66.2	+8.6
Liberal	Jeffrey Roberts		33.8	−8.6
Labor hold		Swing	+8.6	

==== 1980 ====
1980 Australian federal election: Swan
Party	Candidate	Votes	%	±%
Labor	Kim Beazley	32,476	53.3	+13.7
Liberal	John Martyr	24,401	40.1	−2.8
Democrats	Jean Ritter	3,288	5.4	−6.4
Socialist Workers	Stephen Painter	750	1.2	+1.2
Total formal votes		60,915	97.1	
Informal votes		1,790	2.9	
Turnout		62,705	93.3	
Two-party-preferred result
Labor	Kim Beazley		57.6	+8.1
Liberal	John Martyr		42.4	−8.1
Labor gain from Liberal		Swing	+8.1	

=== Elections in the 1970s ===
==== 1977 ====
1977 Australian federal election: Swan
Party	Candidate	Votes	%	±%
Liberal	John Martyr	27,385	42.9	−3.3
Labor	Patricia Fowkes	25,276	39.6	−10.2
Democrats	Hubert Lennerts	7,526	11.8	+11.8
Independent	William Deller	2,474	3.9	+3.9
Progress	Bryan Scott-Courtland	1,194	1.9	+1.9
Total formal votes		63,855	95.6	
Informal votes		2,936	4.4	
Turnout		66,791	95.1	
Two-party-preferred result
Liberal	John Martyr	32,267	50.5	+1.0
Labor	Patricia Fowkes	31,588	49.5	−1.0
Liberal gain from Labor		Swing	+1.0	

==== 1975 ====
1975 Australian federal election: Swan
Party	Candidate	Votes	%	±%
Liberal	John Martyr	30,914	48.8	+9.9
Labor	Adrian Bennett	29,954	47.2	−6.1
National Country	Peter Masson	2,533	4.0	−2.6
Total formal votes		63,401	97.3	
Informal votes		1,748	2.7	
Turnout		65,149	94.3	
Two-party-preferred result
Liberal	John Martyr	33,029	52.1	+7.7
Labor	Adrian Bennett	30,372	47.9	−7.7
Liberal gain from Labor		Swing	+7.7	

==== 1974 ====
1974 Australian federal election: Swan
Party	Candidate	Votes	%	±%
Labor	Adrian Bennett	33,225	53.3	+4.3
Liberal	Geoffrey Hale	24,251	38.9	−4.8
National Alliance	Pietro Bendotti	4,087	6.6	+2.8
Australia	Archelaus Marshall	814	1.3	−0.6
Total formal votes		62,377	97.2	
Informal votes		1,816	2.8	
Turnout		64,193	94.4	
Two-party-preferred result
Labor	Adrian Bennett		55.6	+3.9
Liberal	Geoffrey Hale		44.4	−3.9
Labor hold		Swing	+3.9	

==== 1972 ====
1972 Australian federal election: Swan
Party	Candidate	Votes	%	±%
Labor	Adrian Bennett	28,347	49.5	−2.7
Liberal	Richard Cleaver	24,724	43.2	+1.7
Democratic Labor	David Milne	2,163	3.8	−0.9
Australia	Archelaus Marshall	1,075	1.9	+0.3
Independent	David Smith	921	1.6	+1.6
Total formal votes		57,230	97.1	
Informal votes		1,699	2.9	
Turnout		58,929	93.8	
Two-party-preferred result
Labor	Adrian Bennett		52.2	−1.9
Liberal	Richard Cleaver		47.8	+1.9
Labor hold		Swing	−1.9	

=== Elections in the 1960s ===
==== 1969 ====
1969 Australian federal election: Swan
Party	Candidate	Votes	%	±%
Labor	Adrian Bennett	28,960	52.2	+7.8
Liberal	Richard Cleaver	22,982	41.5	−6.3
Democratic Labor	Alan Crofts	2,608	4.7	−3.1
Australia	Arthur Williams	879	1.6	+1.6
Total formal votes		55,429	97.6	
Informal votes		1,344	2.4	
Turnout		56,773	93.8	
Two-party-preferred result
Labor	Adrian Bennett		54.1	+8.3
Liberal	Richard Cleaver		45.9	−8.3
Labor gain from Liberal		Swing	+8.3	

==== 1966 ====
1966 Australian federal election: Swan
Party	Candidate	Votes	%	±%
Liberal	Richard Cleaver	25,014	47.1	−0.4
Labor	Edward Gillett	23,942	45.1	−2.2
Democratic Labor	Alan Crofts	4,154	7.8	+3.3
Total formal votes		53,110	96.4	
Informal votes		1,963	3.6	
Turnout		55,073	94.2	
Two-party-preferred result
Liberal	Richard Cleaver	28,440	53.5	+1.4
Labor	Edward Gillett	24,670	46.5	−1.4
Liberal hold		Swing	+1.4	

==== 1963 ====
1963 Australian federal election: Swan
Party	Candidate	Votes	%	±%
Liberal	Richard Cleaver	23,547	47.5	−1.8
Labor	Joe Berinson	23,415	47.3	+4.6
Democratic Labor	Gerardus Sappelli	2,253	4.5	−3.6
Independent	Warwick Hill	312	0.6	+0.6
Total formal votes		49,527	98.1	
Informal votes		937	1.9	
Turnout		50,464	95.8	
Two-party-preferred result
Liberal	Richard Cleaver	25,799	52.1	−3.4
Labor	Joe Berinson	23,728	47.9	+3.4
Liberal hold		Swing	−3.4	

==== 1961 ====
1961 Australian federal election: Swan
Party	Candidate	Votes	%	±%
Liberal	Richard Cleaver	22,770	49.3	+0.3
Labor	Ted Johnson	19,712	42.7	+3.6
Democratic Labor	Terence Merchant	3,732	8.1	−3.9
Total formal votes		46,214	97.1	
Informal votes		1,403	2.9	
Turnout		47,617	94.9	
Two-party-preferred result
Liberal	Richard Cleaver	25,671	55.5	+1.9
Labor	Ted Johnson	20,543	44.5	−1.9
Liberal hold		Swing	−1.9	

=== Elections in the 1950s ===
==== 1958 ====
1958 Australian federal election: Swan
Party	Candidate	Votes	%	±%
Liberal	Richard Cleaver	21,428	49.0	−8.7
Labor	Keith Dowding	17,097	39.1	−3.2
Democratic Labor	Charles Noonan	5,237	12.0	+12.0
Total formal votes		43,762	96.9	
Informal votes		1,394	3.1	
Turnout		45,156	95.8	
Two-party-preferred result
Liberal	Richard Cleaver	25,140	57.4	−0.3
Labor	Keith Dowding	18,622	42.6	+0.3
Liberal hold		Swing	−0.3	

==== 1955 ====
1955 Australian federal election: Swan
Party	Candidate	Votes	%	±%
Liberal	Richard Cleaver	22,268	57.7	+6.9
Labor	Thomas Williams	16,314	42.3	−6.9
Total formal votes		38,582	96.4	
Informal votes		1,439	3.6	
Turnout		40,021	95.7	
Liberal hold		Swing	+6.9	

==== 1954 ====
1954 Australian federal election: Swan
Party	Candidate	Votes	%	±%
Labor	Harry Webb	26,799	50.1	+5.9
Liberal	Bill Grayden	25,893	48.4	−4.6
Communist	Jack Marks	838	1.6	−1.2
Total formal votes		53,530	98.4	
Informal votes		856	1.6	
Turnout		53,386	95.8	
Two-party-preferred result
Labor	Harry Webb		51.6	+4.9
Liberal	Bill Grayden		48.4	−4.9
Labor gain from Liberal		Swing	+4.9	

==== 1951 ====
1951 Australian federal election: Swan
Party	Candidate	Votes	%	±%
Liberal	Bill Grayden	24,336	53.0	+0.6
Labor	Harry Webb	20,258	44.2	−3.4
Communist	Alex Jolly	1,280	2.8	+2.8
Total formal votes		45,874	97.5	
Informal votes		1,155	2.5	
Turnout		47,029	95.8	
Two-party-preferred result
Liberal	Bill Grayden		53.3	+0.9
Labor	Harry Webb		46.7	−0.9
Liberal hold		Swing	+0.9	

=== Elections in the 1940s ===
==== 1949 ====
1949 Australian federal election: Swan
Party	Candidate	Votes	%	±%
Liberal	Bill Grayden	22,821	52.4	+11.1
Labor	Harry Webb	20,699	47.6	−9.1
Total formal votes		43,520	97.7	
Informal votes		1,010	2.3	
Turnout		44,530	95.2	
Liberal gain from Labor		Swing	+10.2	

==== 1946 ====
1946 Australian federal election: Swan
Party	Candidate	Votes	%	±%
Labor	Don Mountjoy	25,260	45.6	−4.5
Country	Len Hamilton	17,223	31.1	−15.2
Independent	Bill Grayden	12,856	23.2	+23.2
Total formal votes		55,339	97.2	
Informal votes		1,605	2.8	
Turnout		56,944	92.2	
Two-party-preferred result
Country	Len Hamilton	27,790	50.2	+50.2
Labor	Don Mountjoy	27,549	49.8	−3.2
Country gain from Labor		Swing	+3.2	

==== 1943 ====
1943 Australian federal election: Swan
Party	Candidate	Votes	%	±%
Labor	Don Mountjoy	25,690	50.1	+21.9
Country	Thomas Marwick	18,124	35.3	−17.7
Country	Cecil Elsegood	5,632	11.0	+11.0
Independent	John Tregenza	1,859	3.6	+3.6
Total formal votes		51,305	97.4	
Informal votes		1,369	2.6	
Turnout		52,674	94.8	
Two-party-preferred result
Labor	Don Mountjoy		53.0	+10.5
Country	Thomas Marwick		47.0	−10.5
Labor gain from Country		Swing	+10.5	

==== 1940 by-election ====
1940 Swan by-election
Party	Candidate	Votes	%	±%
Labor	Jim Dinan	16,729	37.4	+9.2
Country	Thomas Marwick	12,354	27.6	−1.6
Country	Percy Ferguson	10,628	23.8	+23.8
Independent	Claude Barker	4,980	11.1	+11.1
Total formal votes		44,691	98.5	
Informal votes		701	1.5	
Turnout		45,392	84.6	
Two-party-preferred result
Country	Thomas Marwick	23,537	52.3	−5.2
Labor	Jim Dinan	21,154	47.3	+5.2
Country hold		Swing	−5.2	

==== 1940 ====
1940 Australian federal election: Swan
Party	Candidate	Votes	%	±%
Country	Henry Gregory	15,997	34.2	+5.1
Labor	Jim Dinan	13,193	28.2	−13.7
Country	Thomas Marwick	8,800	18.8	+18.8
Independent	Claude Barker	7,758	16.6	+16.6
British Israel	John Tregenza	986	2.1	+2.1
Total formal votes		46,734	95.8	
Informal votes		2,073	4.2	
Turnout		48,807	92.4	
Two-party-preferred result
Country	Henry Gregory	26,855	57.5	−0.6
Labor	Jim Dinan	19,879	42.5	+0.6
Country hold		Swing	−0.6	

=== Elections in the 1930s ===
==== 1937 ====
1937 Australian federal election: Swan
Party	Candidate	Votes	%	±%
Country	Henry Gregory	26,299	58.1	−5.9
Labor	John Steele	18,951	41.9	+5.9
Total formal votes		45,250	96.5	
Informal votes		1,623	3.5	
Turnout		46,873	92.5	
Country hold		Swing	−5.9	

==== 1934 ====
1934 Australian federal election: Swan
Party	Candidate	Votes	%	±%
Country	Henry Gregory	32,101	63.2	+8.5
Labor	Frederick Law	18,713	36.8	+7.1
Total formal votes		50,814	96.0	
Informal votes		2,139	4.0	
Turnout		52,953	90.6	
Country hold		Swing	−0.6	

==== 1931 ====
1931 Australian federal election: Swan
Party	Candidate	Votes	%	±%
Country	Henry Gregory	26,234	54.7	−45.3
Labor	John Fraser	14,232	29.7	+29.7
Independent	Carlyle Ferguson	4,623	9.6	+9.6
Independent Country	Alfred Reynolds	2,832	5.9	+5.9
Total formal votes		47,921	95.7	
Informal votes		2,131	4.3	
Turnout		50,002	92.5	
Two-party-preferred result
Country	Henry Gregory		63.8	−36.2
Labor	John Fraser		36.2	+36.2
Country hold		Swing	−36.2	

=== Elections in the 1920s ===
==== 1929 ====
1929 Australian federal election: Swan
Party	Candidate	Votes	%	±%
Country	Henry Gregory	unopposed		
Country hold		Swing		

==== 1928 ====
1928 Australian federal election: Swan
Party	Candidate	Votes	%	±%
Country	Henry Gregory	unopposed		
Country hold		Swing		

==== 1925 ====
1925 Australian federal election: Swan
Party	Candidate	Votes	%	±%
Country	Henry Gregory	24,978	66.2	+66.2
Labor	Ben Davies	12,773	33.8	+33.8
Total formal votes		37,751	96.7	
Informal votes		1,269	3.3	
Turnout		39,020	88.4	
Country hold		Swing	−33.8	

==== 1922 ====
1922 Australian federal election: Swan
Party	Candidate	Votes	%	±%
Country	Henry Gregory	unopposed		
Country hold		Swing		

=== Elections in the 1910s ===
==== 1919 ====
1919 Australian federal election: Swan
Party	Candidate	Votes	%	±%
Labor	Edwin Corboy	7,444	39.1	+39.1
Farmers and Settlers	John Prowse	7,313	38.5	+38.5
Nationalist	William Hedges	4,260	22.4	−77.6
Total formal votes		19,017	93.9	
Informal votes		1,246	6.1	
Turnout		20,263	65.4	
Two-party-preferred result
Farmers and Settlers	John Prowse	11,039	58.0	+58.0
Labor	Edwin Corboy	7,978	42.0	+42.0
Farmers and Settlers gain from Labor		Swing	+58.0	

==== 1918 by-election ====
1918 Swan by-election
Party	Candidate	Votes	%	±%
Labor	Edwin Corboy	6,540	34.4	+34.4
Farmers and Settlers	Basil Murray	5,975	31.4	+31.4
Nationalist	William Hedges	5,635	29.6	−70.4
Independent	William Watson	884	4.6	+4.6
Total formal votes		19,034	99.1	
Informal votes		179	0.9	
Turnout		19,213	64.3	
Labor gain from Nationalist		Swing	+34.4	

==== 1917 ====
1917 Australian federal election: Swan
Party	Candidate	Votes	%	±%
Nationalist	Sir John Forrest	unopposed		
Nationalist hold		Swing		

==== 1914 ====
1914 Australian federal election: Swan
Party	Candidate	Votes	%	±%
Liberal	Sir John Forrest	15,950	59.2	+4.3
Labor	Walter Peters	10,985	40.8	−4.3
Total formal votes		26,935	97.2	
Informal votes		787	2.8	
Turnout		27,722	72.8	
Liberal hold		Swing	+4.3	

==== 1913 ====
1913 Australian federal election: Swan
Party	Candidate	Votes	%	±%
Liberal	Sir John Forrest	15,055	54.9	−1.4
Labor	Peter O'Loghlen	12,379	45.1	+1.4
Total formal votes		27,434	98.6	
Informal votes		396	1.4	
Turnout		27,830	76.5	
Liberal hold		Swing	−1.4	

==== 1910 ====
1910 Australian federal election: Swan
Party	Candidate	Votes	%	±%
Liberal	Sir John Forrest	15,012	60.2	−6.0
Labour	Peter O'Loghlen	9,930	39.8	+6.0
Total formal votes		24,942	98.6	
Informal votes		360	1.4	
Turnout		25,302	64.3	
Liberal hold		Swing	−2.0	

=== Elections in the 1900s ===
==== 1906 ====
1906 Australian federal election: Swan
Party	Candidate	Votes	%	±%
Western Australian	Sir John Forrest	8,418	66.2	−33.8
Labour	Peter O'Loghlen	4,292	33.8	+33.8
Total formal votes		12,710	96.6	
Informal votes		453	3.4	
Turnout		13,163	45.0	
Western Australian hold		Swing	−33.8	

==== 1903 ====
1903 Australian federal election: Swan
Party	Candidate	Votes	%	±%
Protectionist	Sir John Forrest	unopposed		
Protectionist hold		Swing		

==== 1901 ====
1901 Australian federal election: Swan
Party	Candidate	Votes	%	±%
Protectionist	Sir John Forrest	unopposed		
Protectionist win		(new seat)		
