= Electoral results for the Division of Moncrieff =

Australian division election results

This is a list of electoral results for the Division of Moncrieff in Australian federal elections from the division's creation in 1984 until the present.

== Members ==
Member	Party	Term
Kathy Sullivan	Liberal	1984–2001
Steven Ciobo	Liberal	2001–2010
Steven Ciobo	Liberal National	2010–2019
Angie Bell	Liberal National	2019–present

== Election results ==
=== Elections in the 2020s ===
==== 2025 ====
2025 Australian federal election: Moncrieff
Party	Candidate	Votes	%	±%
Liberal National	Angie Bell	42,047	41.91	−4.03
Labor	Blair Stuart	24,536	24.46	+3.65
Greens	Sally Spain	9,558	9.53	−2.54
Independent	Nicole Arrowsmith	7,641	7.62	+7.62
One Nation	Glen Wadsworth	5,894	5.87	−1.24
Trumpet of Patriots	Vic Naicker	4,065	4.05	+3.39
People First	Natasha Szorkovszky	3,547	3.54	+3.54
Family First	Ruth Fea	1,645	1.64	+1.64
Independent	Waddah Weld Ali	1,393	1.39	+1.39
Total formal votes		100,326	93.16	−1.06
Informal votes		7,362	6.84	+1.06
Turnout		107,688	85.62	+0.59
Two-party-preferred result
Liberal National	Angie Bell	58,991	58.80	−2.39
Labor	Blair Stuart	41,335	41.20	+2.39
Liberal National hold		Swing	−2.39	

==== 2022 ====
2022 Australian federal election: Moncrieff
Party	Candidate	Votes	%	±%
Liberal National	Angie Bell	45,104	45.94	−5.58
Labor	Glen Palmer	20,430	20.81	−0.75
Greens	April Broadbent	11,850	12.07	+2.39
One Nation	Leeanne Schultz	6,981	7.11	+0.67
United Australia	Diane Happ	5,482	5.58	+1.86
Liberal Democrats	Diane Demetre	4,305	4.38	+2.42
Animal Justice	Sonia Berry-Law	2,384	2.43	−1.43
Informed Medical Options	Timothy Cudmore	997	1.02	+1.02
Federation	James Tayler	645	0.66	+0.66
Total formal votes		98,178	94.22	+0.66
Informal votes		6,020	5.78	−0.66
Turnout		104,198	85.03	−3.17
Two-party-preferred result
Liberal National	Angie Bell	60,080	61.19	−4.17
Labor	Glen Palmer	38,098	38.81	+4.17
Liberal National hold		Swing	−4.17	

Alluvial diagram for preference flows in the seat of Moncrieff in the 2022 federal election. indicates at what stage the winning candidate had over 50% of the votes and was declared the winner.

=== Elections in the 2010s ===
==== 2019 ====
2019 Australian federal election: Moncrieff
Party	Candidate	Votes	%	±%
Liberal National	Angie Bell	47,356	51.52	−6.84
Labor	Tracey Bell	19,822	21.56	−3.02
Greens	Sally Spain	8,900	9.68	−0.42
One Nation	Vanessa Sibson	5,920	6.44	+6.01
Animal Justice	Karla Freeman	3,551	3.86	+3.86
United Australia	Garry Eilola	3,419	3.72	+3.72
Liberal Democrats	S. Gryphon	1,799	1.96	+1.96
Conservative National	Darren Long	1,152	1.25	+1.25
Total formal votes		91,919	93.56	−1.94
Informal votes		6,327	6.44	+1.94
Turnout		98,246	88.20	+0.50
Two-party-preferred result
Liberal National	Angie Bell	60,079	65.36	+0.75
Labor	Tracey Bell	31,840	34.64	−0.75
Liberal National hold		Swing	+0.75	

==== 2016 ====
2016 Australian federal election: Moncrieff
Party	Candidate	Votes	%	±%
Liberal National	Steven Ciobo	50,688	58.97	+3.28
Labor	Hayden Sheppard	20,956	24.38	+3.56
Greens	Roger Brisbane	8,697	10.12	+3.67
Family First	Julie Rose	5,619	6.54	+4.35
Total formal votes		85,960	95.54	+1.27
Informal votes		4,011	4.46	−1.27
Turnout		89,971	87.37	−3.68
Two-party-preferred result
Liberal National	Steven Ciobo	55,824	64.94	−3.01
Labor	Hayden Sheppard	30,136	35.06	+3.01
Liberal National hold		Swing	−3.01	

==== 2013 ====
2013 Australian federal election: Moncrieff
Party	Candidate	Votes	%	±%
Liberal National	Steven Ciobo	44,295	55.69	−6.16
Labor	Jason Munro	16,562	20.82	−2.66
Palmer United	Grant Pforr	10,882	13.68	+13.68
Greens	Toni McPherson	5,127	6.45	−5.11
Family First	Barrie Nicholson	1,744	2.19	−0.92
One Nation	Veronica Beric	600	0.75	+0.75
Citizens Electoral Council	Paul Spajic	330	0.41	+0.41
Total formal votes		79,540	94.27	+0.45
Informal votes		4,839	5.73	−0.45
Turnout		84,379	91.04	+0.52
Two-party-preferred result
Liberal National	Steven Ciobo	54,051	67.95	+0.46
Labor	Jason Munro	25,489	32.05	−0.46
Liberal National hold		Swing	+0.46	

==== 2010 ====
2010 Australian federal election: Moncrieff
Party	Candidate	Votes	%	±%
Liberal National	Steven Ciobo	46,832	61.85	+2.27
Labor	Robert Hough	17,776	23.48	−6.71
Greens	Sally Spain	8,756	11.56	+5.34
Family First	James Tayler	2,351	3.11	+1.36
Total formal votes		75,715	93.82	−2.37
Informal votes		4,985	6.18	+2.37
Turnout		80,700	90.59	−3.98
Two-party-preferred result
Liberal National	Steven Ciobo	51,103	67.49	+3.69
Labor	Robert Hough	24,612	32.51	−3.69
Liberal National hold		Swing	+3.69	

=== Elections in the 2000s ===
==== 2007 ====
2007 Australian federal election: Moncrieff
Party	Candidate	Votes	%	±%
Liberal	Steven Ciobo	48,594	59.77	−4.03
Labor	Sam Miszkowski	24,397	30.01	+5.66
Greens	Carla Brandon	5,048	6.21	+1.17
Family First	James Tayler	1,440	1.77	−1.26
Democrats	Paul Stevenson	731	0.90	−0.29
Independent	Paul Shears	562	0.69	+0.69
Socialist Alliance	Tim Kirchler	315	0.39	+0.39
Citizens Electoral Council	Elisabeth Thompson	214	0.26	−0.62
Total formal votes		81,301	96.23	+2.26
Informal votes		3,186	3.77	−2.26
Turnout		84,487	92.21	−0.56
Two-party-preferred result
Liberal	Steven Ciobo	52,042	64.01	−5.52
Labor	Sam Miszkowski	29,259	35.99	+5.52
Liberal hold		Swing	−5.52	

==== 2004 ====
2004 Australian federal election: Moncrieff
Party	Candidate	Votes	%	±%
Liberal	Steven Ciobo	46,817	64.38	+10.89
Labor	David Parrish	17,393	23.92	−0.33
Greens	Michael Beale	3,620	4.98	+0.72
Family First	James Tayler	2,186	3.01	+3.01
One Nation	Mark Chapman Smith	1,230	1.69	−3.75
Democrats	Ros Roberts	834	1.15	−3.08
Citizens Electoral Council	Sandy Sanderson	641	0.88	+0.88
Total formal votes		72,721	94.07	+0.92
Informal votes		4,581	5.93	−0.92
Turnout		77,302	91.69	−2.17
Two-party-preferred result
Liberal	Steven Ciobo	51,003	70.14	+3.80
Labor	David Parrish	21,718	29.86	−3.80
Liberal hold		Swing	+3.80	

==== 2001 ====
2001 Australian federal election: Moncrieff
Party	Candidate	Votes	%	±%
Liberal	Steven Ciobo	39,586	50.91	−0.97
Labor	Victoria Chatterjee	19,158	24.64	−4.47
National	Susie Douglas	4,914	6.32	+6.32
One Nation	Lesley Millar	4,458	5.73	−4.44
Democrats	Kari Derrick	3,439	4.42	+0.81
Greens	Dean Hepburn	3,014	3.88	+0.87
Independent	Josephine Tobias	2,286	2.94	+2.94
Independent	Maxwell Aleckson	549	0.71	+0.71
Independent	Maurie Carroll	360	0.46	+0.46
Total formal votes		77,764	92.88	−2.63
Informal votes		5,958	7.12	+2.63
Turnout		83,722	94.48	
Two-party-preferred result
Liberal	Steven Ciobo	50,876	65.42	+2.59
Labor	Victoria Chatterjee	26,888	34.58	−2.59
Liberal hold		Swing	+2.59	

=== Elections in the 1990s ===
==== 1998 ====
1998 Australian federal election: Moncrieff
Party	Candidate	Votes	%	±%
Liberal	Kathy Sullivan	37,527	51.88	−13.10
Labor	Anne Bennett	21,055	29.11	+6.43
One Nation	Warren Fenton	7,357	10.17	+10.17
Democrats	Colin O'Brien	2,610	3.61	−1.57
Greens	Sally Spain	2,175	3.01	−1.77
Christian Democrats	Julie Falcke	1,615	2.23	+1.54
Total formal votes		72,339	95.52	−1.46
Informal votes		3,394	4.48	+1.46
Turnout		75,733	92.67	−0.51
Two-party-preferred result
Liberal	Kathy Sullivan	45,450	62.83	−7.63
Labor	Anne Bennett	26,889	37.17	+7.63
Liberal hold		Swing	−7.63	

==== 1996 ====
1996 Australian federal election: Moncrieff
Party	Candidate	Votes	%	±%
Liberal	Kathy Sullivan	43,098	64.81	+11.84
Labor	Mike Smith	15,150	22.78	−9.27
Greens	Inge Light	3,311	4.98	+0.99
Democrats	Noel Payne	3,286	4.94	+1.05
Independent	Andrew Prenzler	526	0.79	+0.79
Call to Australia	Matthew Mackechnie	494	0.74	+0.74
Natural Law	Sandy Price	327	0.49	+0.49
Indigenous Peoples	Ian Pilgrim	303	0.46	+0.46
Total formal votes		66,495	96.89	−0.52
Informal votes		2,134	3.11	+0.52
Turnout		68,629	93.18	−1.54
Two-party-preferred result
Liberal	Kathy Sullivan	46,599	70.25	+7.34
Labor	Mike Smith	19,731	29.75	−7.34
Liberal hold		Swing	+7.34	

==== 1993 ====
1993 Australian federal election: Moncrieff
Party	Candidate	Votes	%	±%
Liberal	Kathy Sullivan	36,551	52.63	+0.55
Labor	Bob Brown	22,489	32.38	+1.38
National	Warren Pike	3,780	5.44	+0.45
Greens	Sally Mackinnon	2,767	3.98	+3.98
Democrats	Jason Neville	2,672	3.85	−7.55
Confederate Action	Steven Stringer	1,195	1.72	+1.72
Total formal votes		69,454	97.47	−0.21
Informal votes		1,804	2.53	+0.21
Turnout		71,258	94.72	
Two-party-preferred result
Liberal	Kathy Sullivan	43,333	62.41	−0.21
Labor	Bob Brown	26,101	37.59	+0.21
Liberal hold		Swing	−0.21	

==== 1990 ====
1990 Australian federal election: Moncrieff
Party	Candidate	Votes	%	±%
Liberal	Kathy Sullivan	37,630	47.8	+13.1
Labor	Col Struthers	26,473	33.6	−2.3
Democrats	Jonathan Cornish	10,028	12.7	+7.3
National	Peter Lyons	4,549	5.8	−18.2
Total formal votes		78,680	97.6	
Informal votes		1,941	2.4	
Turnout		80,621	93.9	
Two-party-preferred result
Liberal	Kathy Sullivan	46,759	59.5	−0.7
Labor	Col Struthers	31,868	40.5	+0.7
Liberal hold		Swing	−0.7	

=== Elections in the 1980s ===
==== 1987 ====
1987 Australian federal election: Moncrieff
Party	Candidate	Votes	%	±%
Labor	Robert Boyce	23,067	35.9	−0.1
Liberal	Kathy Sullivan	22,271	34.7	+3.8
National	Lester Hughes	15,405	24.0	−3.9
Democrats	George Spencer	3,444	5.4	+1.7
Total formal votes		64,187	96.6	
Informal votes		2,234	3.4	
Turnout		66,421	91.4	
Two-party-preferred result
Liberal	Kathy Sullivan	38,644	60.2	+0.3
Labor	Robert Boyce	25,543	39.8	−0.3
Liberal hold		Swing	+0.3	

==== 1984 ====
1984 Australian federal election: Moncrieff
Party	Candidate	Votes	%	±%
Labor	Athol Paterson	18,847	36.0	−1.5
Liberal	Kathy Martin	16,194	30.9	−5.8
National	Judy Gamin	14,609	27.9	+8.4
Democrats	Susan Mulley	1,958	3.7	−0.5
Independent	Will Aabraham-Steer	471	0.9	+0.9
Independent	Peter Courtney	264	0.5	+0.5
Total formal votes		52,343	94.4	
Informal votes		3,120	5.6	
Turnout		55,463	91.5	
Two-party-preferred result
Liberal	Kathy Martin	31,332	59.9	+3.0
Labor	Athol Paterson	21,011	40.1	−3.0
Liberal hold		Swing	+3.0	
