= List of people who have served in both Houses of the Australian Parliament =

This is a list of Members of the Australian Parliament who have served in both the Senate and the House of Representatives.

Section 43 of the Constitution of Australia says: "A member of either House of the Parliament shall be incapable of being chosen or of sitting as a member of the other House".

Consequently, a member of one house who wishes to transfer to the other house must resign from the first house before the election or appointment to the other house. A person may simultaneously stand for election to both houses, and if successful in both bids, must choose which house they will be a member of. No person has ever successfully stood for election to both houses at the same time.

The following list comprises 56 people (47 men and 9 women). Of these:

- 32 people were members of the House of Representatives before joining the Senate
- 24 people were members of the Senate before joining the House of Representatives.

The first person to have been a member of both houses was James McColl (Victoria), on 1 January 1907. All the other states and territories are represented in the list, the first person from each being:

- Queensland: William Higgs, 13 April 1910
- South Australia: William Story, 5 May 1917
- New South Wales: Josiah Thomas, 1 July 1917
- Tasmania: David O'Keefe, 16 December 1922
- Western Australia: Thomas Marwick, 21 December 1940
- Northern Territory: Grant Tambling, 11 July 1987
- Australian Capital Territory: Bob McMullan, 2 March 1996.

The first woman to have been a member of both houses was Kathy Sullivan (Qld), on 1 December 1984.

In the 47th Parliament:

- four senators (David Fawcett, Pauline Hanson, Deborah O'Neill and Dave Sharma) were previously members of the House of Representatives, and
- three members of the House of Representatives (Barnaby Joyce, David Smith and Matt Thistlethwaite) were previously senators.

Only two people have gone from one house to another and later returned to the first house:

- Jack Duncan-Hughes, House of Representatives 1922–28, Senate 1931–38, House of Representatives 1940–43
- Sir Philip McBride, House of Representatives 1931–37, Senate 1937–44, House of Representatives 1946–58

No member of this list has yet served the Parliament for an aggregate period of 30 years or more. The longest-serving person who has been a member of both houses was Bronwyn Bishop, who was in the Senate for 6 years 229 days, and in the House of Representatives for 22 years 44 days, a total of 28 years 274 days. The shortest-serving person was Thomas Marwick (1 year 65 days in the Senate; 2 years 244 days in the House of Representatives; a total of 3 years 309 days).

There are a number of members who represented different states or territories in the House of Representatives during their career. No person has ever represented more than one state or territory in the Senate. The only person who has ever represented one state or territory in one House and a different state or territory in the other House is Barnaby Joyce (Senate, Queensland, 2005–13; House of Representatives, Division of New England, New South Wales, 2013–17, 2017-).

== List of people who have served in both houses ==
The list is in chronological order based on the date on which the person began their term in the second chamber (in bold).

| Name | Senate | | | | House of Representatives | | | | Total parliamentary service |
| Name | State/ Territory | From | To | Service | Electorate | From | To | Service | Total parliamentary service |
|---|---|---|---|---|---|---|---|---|---|
| James McColl | VIC | **1 January 1907** | 5 September 1914 | 7 years, 248 days | Echuca, Vic | 29 March 1901 | 5 November 1906 | 5 years, 222 days | 13 years, 105 days |
| William Higgs | QLD | 30 March 1901 | 31 December 1906 | 5 years, 277 days | Capricornia, Qld | **13 April 1910** | 16 December 1922 | 12 years, 248 days | 18 years, 160 days |
| Sir Robert Best | VIC | 29 March 1901 | 30 June 1910 | 9 years, 94 days | Kooyong, Vic | **24 August 1910** | 16 December 1922 | 12 years, 115 days | 21 years, 209 days |
| William Story | SA | 1 January 1904 | 3 April 1917 | 13 years, 93 days | Boothby, SA | **5 May 1917** | 16 December 1922 | 5 years, 226 days | 18 years, 319 days |
| George Fairbairn | VIC | **1 July 1917** | 30 June 1923 | 6 years, 0 days | Fawkner, Vic | 12 December 1906 | 31 May 1913 | 6 years, 157 days | 12 years, 157 days |
| Josiah Thomas | NSW | **1 July 1917** | 30 June 1923 | 6 years, 0 days | Barrier, NSW | 29 March 1901 | 26 March 1917 | 15 years, 363 days | 25 years, 227 days |
| Josiah Thomas | NSW | 14 November 1925 | 30 June 1929 | 3 years, 229 days | Barrier, NSW | 29 March 1901 | 26 March 1917 | 15 years, 363 days | 25 years, 227 days |
| Herbert Pratten | NSW | 1 July 1917 | 23 November 1921 | 4 years, 146 days | Parramatta, NSW | **10 December 1921** | 16 December 1922 | 6 years, 150 days | 10 years, 296 days |
| Herbert Pratten | NSW | 1 July 1917 | 23 November 1921 | 4 years, 146 days | Martin, NSW | 16 December 1922 | 7 May 1928 | 6 years, 150 days | 10 years, 296 days |
| David O'Keefe | TAS | 29 March 1901 | 31 December 1906 | 5 years, 278 days | Denison, Tas | **16 December 1922** | 14 November 1925 | 2 years, 334 days | 18 years, 247 days |
| David O'Keefe | TAS | 1 July 1910 | 30 June 1920 | 10 years, 0 days | Denison, Tas | **16 December 1922** | 14 November 1925 | 2 years, 334 days | 18 years, 247 days |
| Sir Walter Massy-Greene | NSW | **17 October 1923** | 13 November 1925 | 2 years, 28 days | Richmond, NSW | 13 April 1910 | 16 December 1922 | 12 years, 248 days | 26 years, 276 days |
| Sir Walter Massy-Greene | NSW | 1 July 1926 | 30 June 1938 | 12 years, 0 days | Richmond, NSW | 13 April 1910 | 16 December 1922 | 12 years, 248 days | 26 years, 276 days |
| Joseph Hannan | VIC | **22 July 1924** | 13 November 1925 | 1 year, 115 days | Fawkner, Vic | 31 May 1913 | 5 May 1917 | 3 years, 340 days | 5 years, 90 days |
| Percy Abbott | NSW | **14 November 1925** | 30 June 1929 | 3 years, 229 days | New England, NSW | 31 May 1913 | 3 November 1919 | 6 years, 157 days | 10 years, 21 days |
| Jack Duncan-Hughes | SA | **19 December 1931** | 30 June 1938 | 6 years, 194 days | Boothby, SA | 16 December 1922 | 17 November 1928 | 5 years, 338 days | 15 years, 137 days |
| Jack Duncan-Hughes | SA | **19 December 1931** | 30 June 1938 | 6 years, 194 days | Wakefield, SA | 21 September 1940 | 21 August 1943 | 2 years, 335 days | 15 years, 137 days |
| Dick Dein | NSW | **1 July 1935** | 30 June 1941 | 6 years, 0 days | Lang, NSW | 19 December 1931 | 7 August 1934 | 2 years, 232 days | 8 years, 232 days |
| William Gibson | VIC | **1 July 1935** | 30 June 1947 | 12 years, 0 days | Corangamite, Vic | 14 December 1918 | 12 October 1929 | 10 years, 303 days | 25 years, 170 days |
| William Gibson | VIC | **1 July 1935** | 30 June 1947 | 12 years, 0 days | Corangamite, Vic | 19 December 1931 | 7 August 1934 | 2 years, 232 days | 25 years, 170 days |
| John Leckie | VIC | **1 July 1935** | 30 June 1947 | 12 years, 0 days | Indi, Vic | 5 May 1917 | 13 December 1919 | 2 years, 241 days | 14 years, 241 days |
| Sir Philip McBride | SA | **21 October 1937** | 30 June 1944 | 6 years, 254 days | Grey, SA | 19 December 1931 | 21 September 1937 | 5 years, 277 days | 24 years, 183 days |
| Sir Philip McBride | SA | **21 October 1937** | 30 June 1944 | 6 years, 254 days | Wakefield, SA | 28 September 1946 | 14 October 1958 | 12 years, 17 days | 24 years, 183 days |
| Oliver Badman | SA | 1 July 1932 | 30 September 1937 | 5 years, 92 days | Grey, SA | **23 October 1937** | 21 August 1943 | 5 years, 303 days | 11 years, 30 days |
| Richard Keane | VIC | **1 July 1938** | 26 April 1946 | 7 years, 300 days | Bendigo, Vic | 12 October 1929 | 19 December 1931 | 2 years, 69 days | 10 years, 4 days |
| Thomas Marwick | WA | 19 August 1936 | 22 October 1937 | 1 year, 65 days | Swan, WA | **21 December 1940** | 21 August 1943 | 2 years, 244 days | 3 years, 309 days |
| Sir Keith Wilson | SA | 1 July 1938 | 30 June 1944 | 6 years, 0 days | Sturt, SA | **10 December 1949** | 29 May 1954 | 4 years, 171 days | 21 years, 132 days |
| Sir Keith Wilson | SA | 1 July 1938 | 30 June 1944 | 6 years, 0 days | Sturt, SA | 10 December 1955 | 31 October 1966 | 10 years, 326 days | 21 years, 132 days |
| Allan Guy | TAS | **22 February 1950** | 30 June 1956 | 6 years, 130 days | Bass, Tas | 12 October 1929 | 15 September 1934 | 4 years, 339 days | 17 years, 112 days |
| Allan Guy | TAS | **22 February 1950** | 30 June 1956 | 6 years, 130 days | Wilmot, Tas | 21 September 1940 | 28 September 1946 | 6 years, 8 days | 17 years, 112 days |
| George Rankin | VIC | **22 February 1950** | 30 June 1956 | 6 years, 130 days | Bendigo, Vic | 23 October 1937 | 31 October 1949 | 12 years, 9 days | 18 years, 139 days |
| Joe Fitzgerald | NSW | **1 July 1962** | 11 April 1974 | 11 years, 285 days | Phillip, NSW | 10 December 1949 | 10 December 1955 | 6 years, 1 day | 17 years, 286 days |
| John Gorton | VIC | 22 February 1950 | 1 February 1968 | 17 years, 345 days | Higgins, Vic | **24 February 1968** | 11 November 1975 | 7 years, 261 days | 25 years, 241 days |
| Don Jessop | SA | **1 July 1971** | 5 June 1987 | 15 years, 340 days | Grey, SA | 26 November 1966 | 25 October 1969 | 2 years, 334 days | 18 years, 309 days |
| Don Chipp | VIC | **1 July 1978** | 18 August 1986 | 8 years, 49 days | Higinbotham, Vic | 10 December 1960 | 25 October 1969 | 16 years, 336 days | 25 years, 20 days |
| Don Chipp | VIC | **1 July 1978** | 18 August 1986 | 8 years, 49 days | Hotham, Vic | 25 October 1969 | 10 November 1977 | 16 years, 336 days | 25 years, 20 days |
| David Hamer | VIC | **1 July 1978** | 30 June 1990 | 12 years, 0 days | Isaacs, Vic | 25 October 1969 | 18 May 1974 | 4 years, 206 days | 18 years, 174 days |
| David Hamer | VIC | **1 July 1978** | 30 June 1990 | 12 years, 0 days | Isaacs, Vic | 13 December 1975 | 10 November 1977 | 1 year, 333 days | 18 years, 174 days |
| Allan Rocher | WA | 1 July 1978 | 10 February 1981 | 2 years, 225 days | Curtin, WA | **21 February 1981** | 3 October 1998 | 17 years, 225 days | 20 years, 85 days |
| Steele Hall | SA | 18 May 1974 | 16 November 1977 | 3 years, 183 days | Boothby, SA | **21 February 1981** | 29 January 1996 | 14 years, 343 days | 18 years, 161 days |
| John Martyr | WA | **11 March 1981** | 4 February 1983 | 1 year, 331 days | Swan, WA | 13 December 1975 | 18 October 1980 | 4 years, 311 days | 6 years, 277 days |
| John Coates | TAS | **1 July 1981** | 20 August 1996 | 15 years, 51 days | Denison, Tas | 2 December 1972 | 13 December 1975 | 3 years, 12 days | 18 years, 63 days |
| Jim Short | VIC | **1 December 1984** | 12 May 1997 | 12 years, 163 days | Ballarat, Vic | 13 December 1975 | 18 October 1980 | 4 years, 311 days | 17 years, 109 days |
| Kathy Sullivan | QLD | 18 May 1974 | 5 November 1984 | 10 years, 172 days | Moncrieff, Qld | **1 December 1984** | 8 October 2001 | 16 years, 312 days | 27 years, 119 days |
| Michael Baume | NSW | **1 July 1985** | 9 September 1996 | 11 years, 71 days | Macarthur, NSW | 13 December 1975 | 5 March 1983 | 7 years, 83 days | 18 years, 154 days |
| Grant Chapman | SA | **11 July 1987** | 30 June 2008 | 20 years, 356 days | Kingston, SA | 13 December 1975 | 5 March 1983 | 7 years, 83 days | 28 years, 74 days |
| Grant Tambling | NT | **11 July 1987** | 9 November 2001 | 14 years, 122 days | Northern Territory, NT | 18 October 1980 | 5 March 1983 | 2 years, 139 days | 16 years, 261 days |
| Fred Chaney | WA | 18 May 1974 | 27 February 1990 | 15 years, 286 days | Pearce, WA | **24 March 1990** | 8 February 1993 | 2 years, 322 days | 18 years, 243 days |
| Bob Woods | NSW | **8 March 1994** | 7 March 1997 | 3 years, 0 days | Lowe, NSW | 11 July 1987 | 13 March 1993 | 5 years, 246 days | 8 years, 246 days |
| Bronwyn Bishop | NSW | 11 July 1987 | 24 February 1994 | 6 years, 229 days | Mackellar, NSW | **26 March 1994** | 9 May 2016 | 22 years, 44 days | 28 years, 274 days |
| Gareth Evans | VIC | 1 July 1978 | 6 February 1996 | 17 years, 221 days | Holt, Vic | **2 March 1996** | 30 September 1999 | 3 years, 213 days | 21 years, 69 days |
| Bob McMullan | ACT | 16 February 1988 | 6 February 1996 | 7 years, 356 days | Canberra, ACT | **2 March 1996** | 3 October 1998 | 14 years, 140 days | 22 years, 86 days |
| Bob McMullan | ACT | 16 February 1988 | 6 February 1996 | 7 years, 356 days | Fraser, ACT | 3 October 1998 | 19 July 2010 | 14 years, 140 days | 22 years, 86 days |
| Cheryl Kernot | QLD | 1 July 1990 | 15 October 1997 | 7 years, 107 days | Dickson, Qld | **3 October 1998** | 10 November 2001 | 3 years, 39 days | 10 years, 146 days |
| Michael Ronaldson | VIC | **1 July 2005** | 28 February 2016 | 10 years, 242 days | Ballarat, Vic | 24 March 1990 | 8 October 2001 | 11 years, 199 days | 22 years, 76 days |
| Belinda Neal | NSW | 8 March 1994 | 3 September 1998 | 4 years, 180 days | Robertson, NSW | **24 November 2007** | 19 July 2010 | 2 years, 238 days | 7 years, 53 days |
| David Fawcett | SA | **1 July 2011** | 30 June 2025 | 14 years, 0 days | Wakefield, SA | 9 October 2004 | 24 November 2007 | 3 years, 47 days | 14 years, 47 days |
| David Feeney | VIC | 1 July 2008 | 12 August 2013 | 5 years, 43 days | Batman, VIC | **7 September 2013** | 1 February 2018 | 4 years, 147 days | 9 years, 190 days |
| Barnaby Joyce | QLD | 1 July 2005 | 8 August 2013 | 8 years, 39 days | New England, NSW | **7 September 2013** | 27 October 2017 | 4 years, 51 days | 21 years, 50 days |
| Barnaby Joyce | QLD | 1 July 2005 | 8 August 2013 | 8 years, 39 days | New England, NSW | 2 December 2017 | currently serving | 8 years, 325 days | 21 years, 50 days |
| Matt Thistlethwaite | NSW | 1 July 2011 | 9 August 2013 | 2 years, 40 days | Kingsford Smith, NSW | **7 September 2013** | currently serving | 13 years, 46 days | 15 years, 86 days |
| Deborah O'Neill | NSW | **13 November 2013** | currently serving | 12 years, 344 days | Robertson, NSW | 25 August 2010 | 7 September 2013 | 3 years, 13 days | 15 years, 357 days |
| Pauline Hanson | QLD | **2 July 2016** | currently serving | 10 years, 113 days | Oxley, Qld | 2 March 1996 | 3 October 1998 | 2 years, 215 days | 12 years, 327 days |
| David Smith | ACT | 23 May 2018 | 11 April 2019 | 323 days | Bean, ACT | **18 May 2019** | currently serving | 7 years, 158 days | 8 years, 116 days |
| Sarah Henderson | VIC | **11 September 2019** | currently serving | 7 years, 42 days | Corangamite, Vic | 7 September 2013 | 18 May 2019 | 5 years, 253 days | 12 years, 295 days |
| Dave Sharma | NSW | **30 November 2023** | currently serving | 2 years, 327 days | Wentworth, NSW | 18 May 2019 | 21 May 2022 | 3 years, 3 days | 5 years, 330 days |
| Ben Small | WA | 25 November 2020 | 15 April 2022 | 1 year, 142 days | Forrest, WA | **3 May 2025** | currently serving | 1 year, 173 days | 2 years, 359 days |
| Ben Small | WA | 18 May 2022 | 30 June 2022 | 44 days | Forrest, WA | **3 May 2025** | currently serving | 1 year, 173 days | 2 years, 359 days |
| Anne Urquhart | TAS | 1 July 2011 | 28 March 2025 | 13 years, 271 days | Braddon, TAS | **3 May 2025** | currently serving | 1 year, 173 days | 15 years, 79 days |
| Michelle Ananda-Rajah | VIC | **1 July 2025** | currently serving | 1 year, 114 days | Higgins, VIC | 21 May 2022 | 28 March 2025 | 2 years, 312 days | 4 years, 63 days |

== Sources ==
- Parliamentary Handbook: Members who have served in both chambers
- Parliamentary Handbook: Members of the Senate since 1901
- Parliamentary Handbook: Members of the House of Representatives since 1901
