= Members of the Australian Senate, 1935–1938 =

Senate composition at 1 July 1935
Government (33) - (15 seat majority)
United Australia Party (26) (Note: At the 23 October 1937 election UAP Senator Guy Arkins was defeated for a casual vacancy by Labor candidate Bill Ashley.)
Country Party (7) (Note: At the 23 October 1937 election Country Party Senator Thomas Marwick was defeated for a casual vacancy by Labor candidate James Cunningham.)

Opposition (3)
Labor (3)

Changes in composition

This is a list of members of the Australian Senate from 1935 to 1938. Half of its members were elected at the 19 December 1931 election and had terms starting on 1 July 1932 and finishing on 30 June 1938; the other half were elected at the 15 September 1934 election and had terms starting on 1 July 1935 and finishing on 30 June 1941. The process for filling casual vacancies was complex. While senators were elected for a six-year term, people appointed to a casual vacancy only held office until the earlier of the next election for the House of Representatives or the Senate.

Senator	Party	State	Term ending	Years in office
Mac Abbott	Country	New South Wales	1941	1935–1941
Guy Arkins (Note: UAP Senator Lionel Courtenay died on 11 July 1935 before he could take his seat. UAP member Guy Arkins was appointed to replace him on 26 September, with his term expiring at the 23 October 1937 election, when he was defeated by Labor candidate Bill Ashley to fill the remainder of the vacancy, expiring on 30 June 1941.)	United Australia	New South Wales	1937 (Note: Appointed to a casual vacancy and only held office until the earlier of the next election for the House of Representatives or the Senate.)	1935–1937
Bill Ashley	Labor	New South Wales	1941	1937–1958
Oliver Badman (Note: Country Party senator Oliver Badman resigned on 30 September 1937 to run for the House of Representatives seat of the Grey; UAP member for Grey, Philip McBride was appointed to replace him on 21 October, with his term expiring at the 23 October 1937 election, when he was re-elected with his term expiring on 30 June 1944.)	Country	South Australia	1938	1932–1937
Charles Brand	United Australia	Victoria	1941	1935–1947
Tom Brennan	United Australia	Victoria	1938	1931–1938
Gordon Brown	Labor	Queensland	1938	1932–1965
William Carroll (Note: Country Party Senator William Carroll died on 30 May 1936; Country Party member Thomas Marwick was appointed to replace him on 19 August, with his term expiring at the 23 October 1937 election, when he was defeated by Labor candidate James Cunningham for the vacancy.)	Country	Western Australia	1938	1926–1936
Herbert Collett	United Australia	Western Australia	1941	1933–1947
Joe Collings	Labor	Queensland	1938	1932–1950
Walter Cooper	Country	Queensland	1941	1928–1932, 1935–1968
Lionel Courtenay	United Australia	New South Wales	1941	1935
Ben Courtice (Note: Labor Senator John MacDonald died on 17 August 1937; Labor member Ben Courtice was appointed to replace him on 26 September, with his term expiring at the 23 October 1937 election, when he was re-elected with his term expiring on 30 June 1944.)	Labor	Queensland	1937, 1938	1937–1962
Charles Cox	United Australia	New South Wales	1938	1920–1938
Thomas Crawford	United Australia	Queensland	1941	1917–1947
James Cunningham	Labor	Western Australia	1938	1937–1943
Dick Dein	United Australia	New South Wales	1941	1935–1941
Jack Duncan-Hughes	United Australia	South Australia	1938	1931–38
Harry Foll	United Australia	Queensland	1941	1917–1947
William Gibson	Country / Independent (Note: Gibson was elected to the Senate on a joint ticket with the UAP, with the support of the Victorian state executive of the Country Party. This was opposed by the federal executive, which endorsed the sitting Country Party senator Robert Elliott; he was defeated. Gibson took his seat on 1 July 1935 as a member of the Country Party. However, on 23 September the parliamentary party voted to expel him. He was not re-admitted to the party until November 1939.)	Victoria	1941	1935–1947
Charles Grant	United Australia	Tasmania	1941	1925, 1932–1941
James Guthrie	United Australia	Victoria	1938	1920–1938
Charles Hardy	Country	New South Wales	1938	1932–1938
John Hayes	United Australia	Tasmania	1941	1923–1947
Herbert Hays	United Australia	Tasmania	1941	1923–1947
Bertie Johnston	Country	Western Australia	1941	1929–1942
John Leckie	United Australia	Victoria	1941	1935–1947
Patrick Lynch	United Australia	Western Australia	1938	1907–1938
Allan MacDonald	United Australia	Western Australia	1941	1935–1947
John MacDonald	Labor	Queensland	1938	1922, 1928, 1932–1937
Walter Massy-Greene	United Australia	New South Wales	1938	1923–1925, 1926–1938
Thomas Marwick	Country	Western Australia	1937	1936–1937
Philip McBride	United Australia	South Australia	1937, 1938	1937–1944
Alexander McLachlan	United Australia	South Australia	1938	1926–1944
James McLachlan	United Australia	South Australia	1941	1935–1947
George McLeay	United Australia	South Australia	1941	1935–1947, 1950–1955
John Millen	United Australia	Tasmania	1938	1920–1938
Herbert Payne	United Australia	Tasmania	1938	1920–1938
Sir George Pearce (Note: Father of the Senate)	United Australia	Western Australia	1938	1901–1938
William Plain	United Australia	Victoria	1938	1917–1923, 1925–1938
Burford Sampson	United Australia	Tasmania	1938	1925–1938, 1941–1947
Oliver Uppill	United Australia	South Australia	1941	1935–1944
