= Gawler and District College =

Location
- Evanston, South Australia; Australia
- 34.6195°S 138.7380°E

Information
- Type: Public early learning centre and primary and secondary school
- Motto: A history of achievement. A future of potential.
- Established: 1907 (Gawler High School); 1952 (Evanston Primary School); 2013 (Gawler and District College)
- Principal: Craig Brown
- Enrolment: 1,145 (2014)
- Website: gdc.sa.edu.au

Gawler and District College is a public early learning centre and primary and secondary school located in the suburb of Evanston on the southern side of Gawler, 45 kilometres (28 mi) north of the city centre of Adelaide, the capital of South Australia. The college offers education from birth to year 12.

== History ==
Gawler and District College was created in 2013 through combining the Gawler High School, Evanston Primary School and Evanston Preschool into one site, the site formerly occupied by the high school.

Gawler High School was a secondary public school located in Evanston, South Australia. The school was founded in 1907 as the Gawler School of Mines. It moved to a site on Lyndoch Road in Gawler East in 1915, and moved to the Evanston site in the 1960s. (with the motto, Vade ad Formicam), making it the oldest school in the area. The last principal of Gawler High School was Mr. Greg Harvey who succeeded Sandra Lowery, who left the school at the end of the 2007 school year, ending her 15 years as headmistress. Gawler High School had some 800 pupils as of 2009, ranging from educational year groups eight to twelve.

Evanston Primary School was founded in the 1950s as the suburb of Evanston was growing. It was located facing Para Road behind the Gawler High School.

== Notable alumni ==
- Angie Bell, Federal MP for Moncrieff
- Simon Birmingham, Former Senator for South Australia
- Clyde Cameron
- John Dawkins, Former Member of South Australian Parliament
- Max Fatchen, journalist
- Alan Hickinbotham
- Brenton Langbein, violinist, composer, and conductor
- Darren Lehmann, cricketer
- Lisa Martin (Lisa Ondieki), long-distance runner
- Glenn Shorrock, singer/songwriter
