= Steven Ciobo =

Australian politician

The Honourable Steven Ciobo
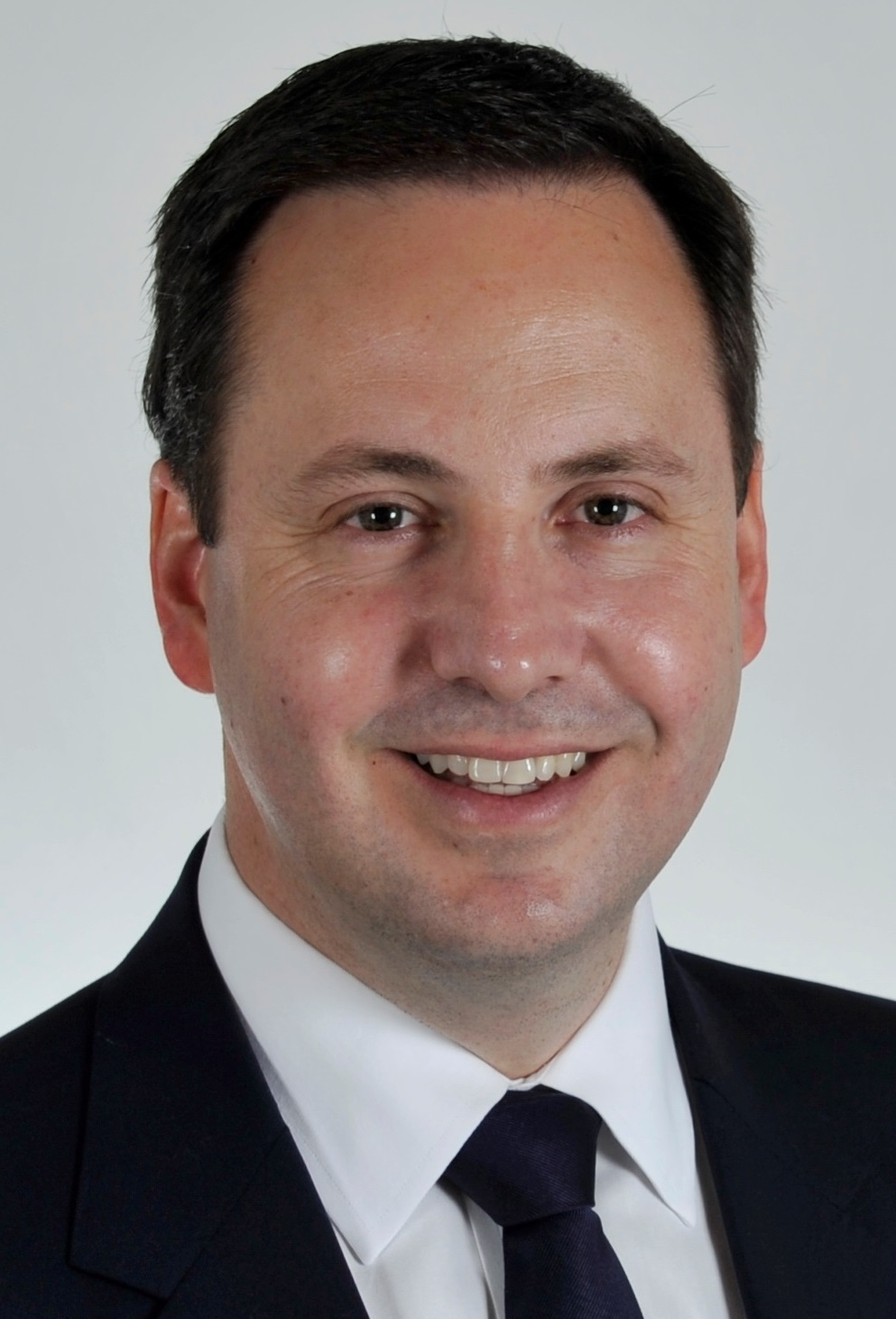

Minister for Defence Industry
- In office 28 August 2018 – 2 March 2019
- Prime Minister: Scott Morrison
- Preceded by: Christopher Pyne
- Succeeded by: Linda Reynolds

Minister for Trade, Tourism and Investment
- In office 18 February 2016 – 27 August 2018
- Prime Minister: Malcolm Turnbull; Scott Morrison
- Preceded by: Andrew Robb
- Succeeded by: Simon Birmingham

Minister for International Development and the Pacific
- In office 21 September 2015 – 18 February 2016
- Prime Minister: Malcolm Turnbull
- Preceded by: Melissa Parke (2013)
- Succeeded by: Concetta Fierravanti-Wells

Member of the Australian Parliament for Moncrieff
- In office 10 November 2001 – 11 April 2019
- Preceded by: Kathy Sullivan
- Succeeded by: Angie Bell

Personal details
- Born: 29 May 1974 (age 52) Mareeba, Queensland
- Party: Liberal (LNP)
- Spouse: Astra Hauquitz
- Education: Bond University; Queensland University of Technology
- Website: stevenciobo.com/

Steven Michele Ciobo (/tʃoʊˈboʊ/ CHOH-boh) (born 29 May 1974) is a retired Australian politician who represented the Division of Moncrieff in the House of Representatives from the 2001 federal election until his retirement at the 2019 election. He was a member of the Liberal National Party of Queensland, and sat with the Liberal Party in federal parliament. On 1 March 2019 Ciobo announced his decision to retire from politics at the 2019 federal election.

Ciobo served as the Minister for Trade, Tourism and Investment in the Turnbull government from February 2016 until his resignation on 21 August 2018 in the wake of the Liberal Party leadership spill earlier that day. He went on to serve as Minister for Defence Industry, working in conjunction with the Defence Minister, until his resignation in March 2019. He previously served as Minister for International Development and the Pacific from September 2015 to February 2016, and earlier as a parliamentary secretary in the Abbott government from September 2013 to September 2015 (initially to the Treasurer and later to the Minister for Foreign Affairs and Minister for Trade and Investment).

== Early life and education ==
Ciobo was born and raised in Mareeba, North Queensland, the youngest of three children in an Anglican family. His parents, Bruno and Joan, ran a tourism business in Cairns. Ciobo's father was born in Bari, Italy, while his paternal grandfather was born in Valona (modern Vlorë), Ottoman Empire. His maternal grandfather was born in London.

Ciobo graduated in law and commerce from Bond University and earned a master's degree in law from the Queensland University of Technology. He worked at a food processing factory to help support himself while studying. While at university he reportedly considered joining Australia's domestic intelligence agency, the Australian Security Intelligence Organisation (ASIO). Before entering parliament, Ciobo worked as a consultant with Coopers & Lybrand, as a senior consultant with PricewaterhouseCoopers, and as an adviser to Senator Brett Mason.

== Political career ==
=== Howard government (2001–07) ===
Ciobo was elected to parliament at the 2001 federal election, replacing the retiring Kathy Sullivan in the Division of Moncrieff.

Ciobo has repeatedly called for the introduction of daylight saving for South East Queensland, despite this position being at odds of that of some of his Liberal National Party colleagues in the Queensland Parliament.

In 2005, he urged the government to change the law to strip naturalised Australians of their citizenship if they incite, support or engage in terrorist activity. In 2006, Ciobo called for the first home owner grant to be doubled, a policy which was adopted by the Rudd government in October 2008 as an economic stimulus measure.

In the lead up to the 2007 federal election, responding to a dare from a local radio station, Ciobo and his wife were thrown into the air on a sling shot bungee at the Surfers Paradise Adrenalin Park. While hurled up in the air, Ciobo's wife spotted one of her husband's stolen election signs on the balcony of a Surfers Paradise apartment. The radio station has since posted a video of the dare on YouTube.

=== Opposition (2007–13) ===
After the Coalition lost the 2007 election, Ciobo was made Shadow Minister for Small Business, the Service Economy and Tourism in the Shadow Cabinet of Brendan Nelson. Nelson promoted him into the shadow ministry despite Ciobo publicly pledging his support for Nelson's opponent, Malcolm Turnbull, in the previous month's leadership ballot. Ciobo was critical of the merger of the Liberal and National parties in Queensland, telling ABC Local Radio in July 2008: "I don't believe it's going to have a positive effect on a federal level. But at a state level it certainly is going to make a very big difference."

When Turnbull replaced Nelson as leader in September 2008, Ciobo's portfolio was changed to Shadow Minister for Small Business, Independent Contractors, Tourism and the Arts. In December 2009, Tony Abbott won a leadership ballot to replace Turnbull as Leader of the Opposition. He subsequently demoted Ciobo to the outer frontbench, as the Shadow Minister for Tourism and the Arts and the Shadow Minister for Youth and Sport.

In September 2010, shortly after the 2010 federal election, Opposition Leader Tony Abbott removed Ciobo from the shadow ministry, relegating him to the backbench. Abbott refused to answer questions on the reason for Ciobo's demotion, other than to say: "There is something of the quality of snakes and ladders about the business of politics." In an article in The Australian, contributing editor Peter van Onselen speculated the reasons for Ciobo's demotion were that "Abbott has never especially gotten along with Ciobo personally" and that Ciobo was "a Malcolm Turnbull lieutenant." Van Onselen said the demotion reflected poorly on Abbott because Ciobo is "talented, a good media performer and part of the next generation in the Liberal Party."

In November 2009, Ciobo introduced his first private members bill as a shadow minister. The bill proposed changes to the government's producer offset to encourage more local feature film production.

In November 2008, Ciobo attacked the Rudd government over Peter Garrett's decision to axe funding for the Australian National Academy of Music, saying the decision was "the latest chapter in bungled Labor decisions that have ended one of Australia's centres of excellence and left students' futures in limbo". He also said Garrett's move to scrap the Uluru climb would be another setback to the tourism industry which had been affected by the Great Recession. In April 2011, Ciobo called for a radical rethink of the tourism strategy for the Gold Coast, calling on the city to focus on more casinos and glitz. He said turning Surfers Paradise into a world-class entertainment precinct to rival Las Vegas and Macau was the solution to save the Gold Coast from rising unemployment and economic doom.

In 2011 Ciobo and Labor MP Kelvin Thomson were seconded to the United Nations in New York City for 12 weeks.

Ciobo was a prominent opponent of Andrew Wilkie's plan (initially adopted by the Gillard government but later shelved) to require all poker machine players to set a daily betting limit. He told a Queensland newspaper the plan "will place the entire population that want to have a $10 flutter within arms' reach of big brother government."

In an opinion piece he wrote for ABC's The Drum in June 2011, Ciobo declared he was a libertarian who would "attempt to persuasively argue the need for less regulation." In the article he said that "like the Tassie Tiger, personal responsibility has died out" and that "increasingly, I find myself thinking it is not this new law that is required, rather, it is a good dose of 'toughen up and stop blaming others for your bad decision'."

=== Abbott government (2013–15) ===
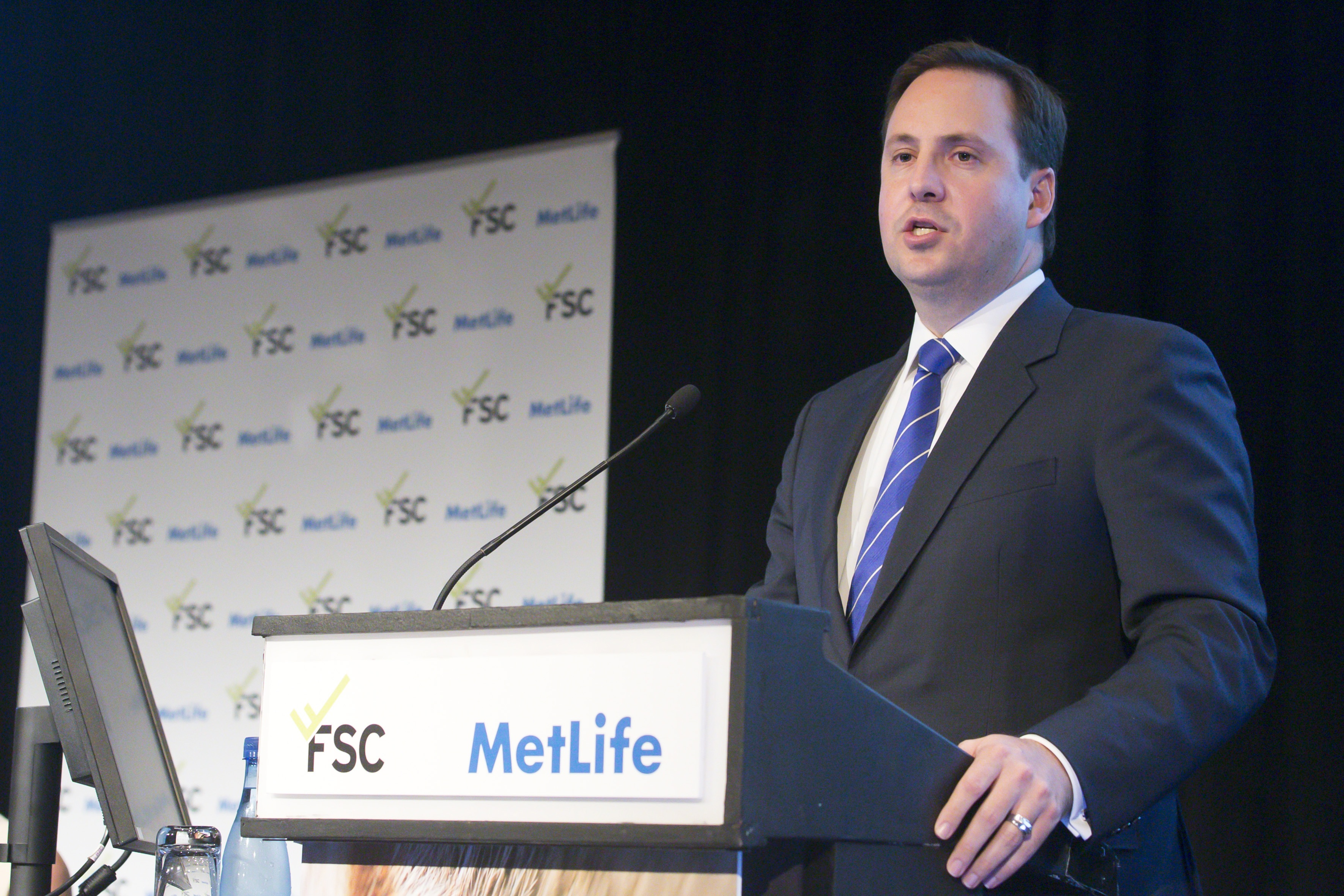
Ciobo addressing a Financial Services Council conference in Sydney in 2014.

On 18 September 2013 Ciobo was appointed the Parliamentary Secretary to the Treasurer, Joe Hockey. He was also appointed as Australia's alternate governor to the World Bank, Asian Development Bank and European Bank for Reconstruction and Development. Ciobo was given responsibility for the Foreign Investment Review Board, the Australian Bureau of Statistics, the Royal Australian Mint, the National Housing Supply Council and the Australian Valuation Office. Since his appointment, Ciobo has abolished both the National Housing Supply Council, saying the council's activities were "no longer needed"; and the Australian Valuation Office, saying "a compelling case for the Commonwealth providing its own valuation services no longer exists, particularly given there is a highly competitive market of private sector providers"; and announced plans to privatise the Royal Australian Mint.

In December 2014, Ciobo was appointed as the Parliamentary Secretary to the Minister for Foreign Affairs and to the Minister for Trade and Investment.

==== Zaky Mallah incident ====
In June 2015, Ciobo was part of an ABC Q&A panel when he was asked a question from a member of the live audience. The questioner, Zaky Mallah, was the first to be charged under new anti-terrorism laws in 2003, and had been found not guilty after spending two years in a correctional facility pending trial. Mallah asked Ciobo a question that had been pre-approved by the ABC: "What would have happened if my [terrorism] case had been decided by the Minister and not the courts?" Ciobo responded that he understood Mallah's acquittal had been on a technicality, and he would be happy to see the government remove Mallah from Australia. Mallah later was given an opportunity to respond, and stated "The Liberals now have just justified to many Australian Muslims in the community tonight to leave and go to Syria and join ISIS because of ministers like him." Moderator Tony Jones called these comments "totally out of order". Mallah later wrote, in Comment is free, that he "hates ISIS" and his comments were "misinterpreted".

Following this incident, the ABC reported that it had received over 1,000 complaints about Zaky Mallah's presence in the audience, while Australian Prime Minister Tony Abbott condemned the ABC - asking "which side is the ABC on?" and accusing it of having 'betrayed' Australia. Abbott subsequently banned front bench members of his government from appearing on Q&A, demanding that the show be moved to another part of the ABC's editorial programming. When the ABC met Abbott's demands, accusations were made by an ABC 'source' that this was "the biggest example of editorial interference I've ever heard of".

=== Turnbull government (2015–2018) ===
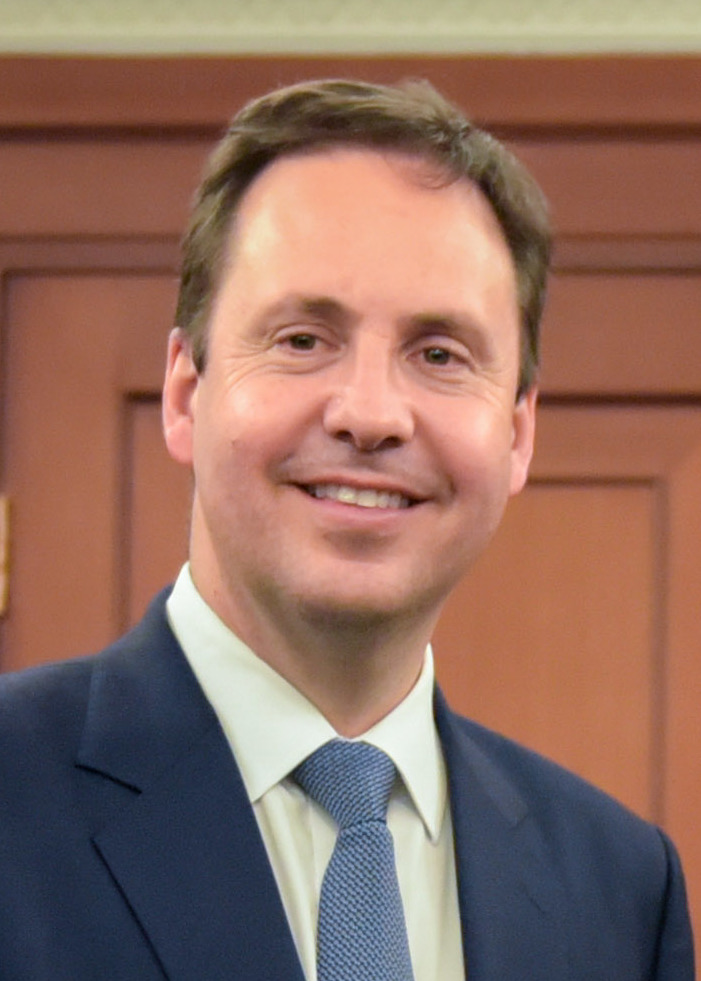
Ciobo in 2017

Ciobo reportedly supported Malcolm Turnbull in the 2015 leadership spill that saw Tony Abbott replaced as leader. He was subsequently made Minister for International Development and the Pacific – a new position – in the first Turnbull Ministry. Following the retirement of Andrew Robb in February 2016, he was promoted to Minister for Trade and Investment. His title was altered to Minister for Trade, Tourism and Investment in July 2016.

In early 2016, Ciobo publicly opposed Sydney's lock-out laws. Confronted with statistics of a 42.2% drop in assaults after Sydney instated lock-out laws, he responded "Well how does that sit with the way in which patronage is down? I heard someone quip, 'well there were 0 assaults in the Simpson desert too.'"

Ciobo ran in the August 2018 Deputy Liberal Party leadership spill Minister for the Environment and Energy Josh Frydenberg won a majority in the first round with 46 votes, while Minister for Trade, Tourism and Investment Steven Ciobo received 20 and Minister for Health Greg Hunt received 16.

On 1 March 2019 Ciobo announced his decision to retire from politics at the next federal election.

== Post-politics ==
Ciobo advised Bain Capital on its 2020 acquisition of Virgin Australia. He subsequently joined private equity firm Stonepeak Infrastructure Partners, based in New York as a managing director with responsibility for "global affairs and engagement".

== Personal life ==
Ciobo is married with two children and lives on the Gold Coast. In 2010, he told a newspaper his happiest moment was when his son, who was born with a heart condition, came through a five-and-a-half-hour operation well. His wife, Astra Ciobo, is a successful businesswoman who co-founded a Gold Coast public relations firm.

== See also ==
- Electoral results for the Division of Moncrieff

Parliament of Australia
Preceded by Kathy Sullivan	Member for Moncrieff; 2001–2019	Succeeded by Angie Bell
Political offices
New ministerial post	Minister for International Development and the Pacific; 2015–2016	Succeeded by Concetta Fierravanti-Wells
Preceded by Andrew Robb	Minister for Trade and Investment; 2016–2018	Succeeded by Simon Birmingham
Preceded by Christopher Pyne	Minister for Defence Industry; 2018–2019	Succeeded by Linda Reynolds
