= Simon Birmingham =

Australian politician (born 1974)

The Honourable Simon Birmingham
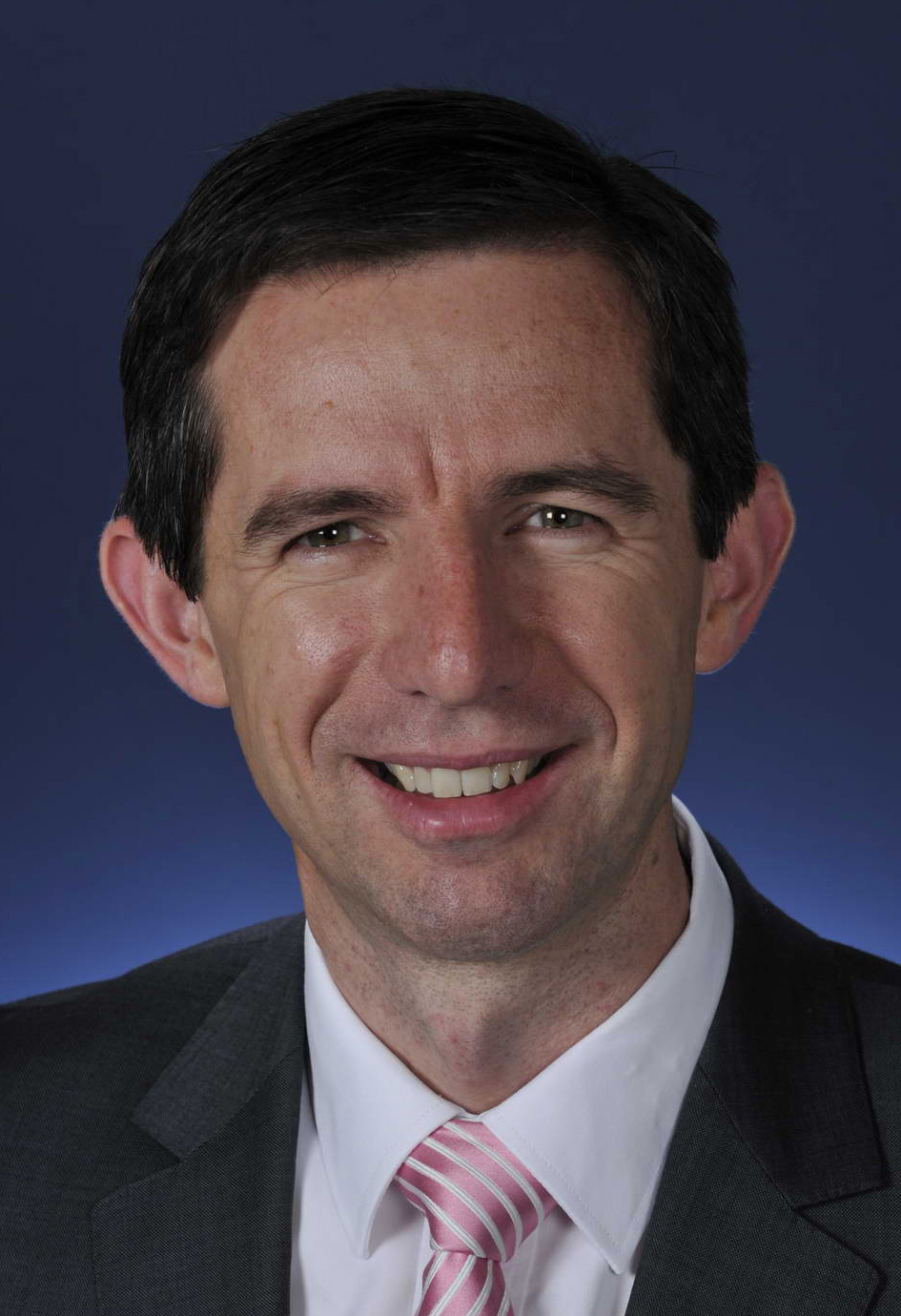
- Official portrait, 2015

Senator for South Australia
- In office 3 May 2007 – 28 January 2025
- Preceded by: Jeannie Ferris
- Succeeded by: Leah Blyth
Ministerial positions
Leader of the Opposition in the Senate
In office 23 May 2022 – 25 January 2025
Deputy	Michaelia Cash
Leader	Peter Dutton
Preceded by	Penny Wong
Succeeded by	Michaelia Cash
Leader of the Government in the Senate
In office 30 October 2020 – 23 May 2022
Prime Minister	Scott Morrison
Preceded by	Mathias Cormann
Succeeded by	Penny Wong
Acting; 23 August 2018 – 24 August 2018
Prime Minister	Malcolm Turnbull
Deputy	Marise Payne (acting)
Preceded by	Mathias Cormann
Succeeded by	Mathias Cormann
Minister for Finance
In office 30 October 2020 – 23 May 2022 Serving with Scott Morrison
Prime Minister	Scott Morrison
Preceded by	Mathias Cormann
Succeeded by	Katy Gallagher
Vice-President of the Executive Council
In office 30 October 2020 – 23 May 2022
Prime Minister	Scott Morrison
Preceded by	Mathias Cormann
Succeeded by	Katy Gallagher
Minister for Trade, Tourism and Investment
In office 28 August 2018 – 22 December 2020
Prime Minister	Scott Morrison
Preceded by	Steven Ciobo
Succeeded by	Dan Tehan
Deputy Leader of the Government in the Senate
In office 28 August 2018 – 30 October 2020
Prime Minister	Scott Morrison
Leader	Mathias Cormann
Preceded by	Mitch Fifield
Succeeded by	Michaelia Cash
Minister for Education and Training
In office 21 September 2015 – 28 August 2018
Prime Minister	Malcolm Turnbull; Scott Morrison
Preceded by	Christopher Pyne
Succeeded by	Dan Tehan
Assistant Minister for Education and Training
In office 23 December 2014 – 21 September 2015
Prime Minister	Tony Abbott; Malcolm Turnbull
Preceded by	Sussan Ley
Succeeded by	Office abolished

Personal details
- Born: Simon John Birmingham; 14 June 1974 (age 52) Ashford, South Australia
- Party: Liberal
- Spouse: Courtney Morcombe (m. 2008)
- Education: University of Adelaide
- Website: senatorbirmingham.com.au

Simon John Birmingham (born 14 June 1974) is an Australian former politician who was a senator for South Australia from 2007 to 2025. He held various ministerial positions in the Abbott, Turnbull, and Morrison governments from 2014 to 2022.

In 2020, Birmingham was sworn in as Minister for Finance and became leader of the Government in the Senate following the resignation of Mathias Cormann. After the Liberal–National Coalition's loss at the 2022 election, Birmingham became the leader of the opposition in the Senate, as well as becoming Shadow Minister for Foreign Affairs in the shadow ministry of Peter Dutton.

== Early life and career ==
Simon John Birmingham was born on 14 June 1974 in Adelaide. He grew up on his family's horse agistment property near Gawler, South Australia. He was educated at Gawler High School and the University of Adelaide; neither of his parents had attended university. He has cited his grandmother Madge Herde, a school principal, as a key influence in his decision to enter politics.

Birmingham was named South Australia's Lions Club Youth of the Year in 1992 and awarded the Town of Gawler's Australia Day Young Citizen of the Year Award in 1993. He commenced studying an economics degree, but left his course to work for Senator Robert Hill. He later returned to study and completed a Master of Business Administration from the Adelaide Graduate School of Business, University of Adelaide.

He began his career working as an electorate officer for Senator Robert Hill. In 1997 Birmingham moved from federal to state politics, working as a ministerial advisor to Joan Hall.

Early in 2000 Birmingham moved to Canberra to become the national manager of public affairs for the Australian Hotels Association. In late 2001, Birmingham was appointed chief of staff to the South Australian state minister for tourism and innovation, Martin Hamilton-Smith. Following a change of government in 2002, Birmingham began work with the Winemakers' Federation of Australia where he remained until his appointment to the Senate in 2007.

== Political career ==
At the age of 29, Birmingham won Liberal Party preselection for the marginal seat of Hindmarsh at the 2004 federal election following the retirement of sitting member Chris Gallus. The seat was narrowly won by Labor's Steve Georganas.

After an unsuccessful attempt to fill the vacancy created by Robert Hill's retirement from the Senate in 2006, Birmingham won Liberal Party preselection as a Senate candidate in 2007 federal election and was elected for a six-year term. However, he entered the Senate earlier, being appointed to fill the vacancy caused by the death of Senator Jeannie Ferris. At the time of his appointment on 3 May 2007, Birmingham was the youngest member of the Australian Senate. He is identified with the moderate wing of the Liberal Party.

Birmingham served on Senate Environment, Communications, and Arts Committees from May 2007 to February 2010, the Senate Select Committee on the National Broadband Network as well as the Joint Standing Committee on Treaties from 2007 to September 2012. He was also the Chair of the Senate Environment and Communications References Committee (from September 2012), the Deputy Chair of the Senate Environment and Communications Legislation Committee (from September 2012), a member of the Joint Standing Committee on Electoral Matters (from February 2008) and a member of the Joint Committee on the National Broadband Network (from March 2011).

Birmingham is also deputy chair of the Parliamentary Association for UNICEF. Birmingham has a keen interest in water issues including the health and future of the Murray Darling Basin, and in December 2008 introduced a Private Member's Bill, Water Amendment (Saving the Goulburn and Murray Rivers) Bill 2008. In December 2009 Birmingham was appointed to the Coalition frontbench as Shadow Parliamentary Secretary for the Murray Darling Basin and Shadow Parliamentary Secretary for Climate Action. After the 2010 election he was re-appointed Shadow Parliamentary Secretary for the Murray Darling Basin and appointed Shadow Parliamentary Secretary for the Environment. He also represented the Shadow Minister for Communications and Broadband, Hon Malcolm Turnbull, in the Senate.

In December 2023, he travelled to Israel following the October 7 attacks. His travel and hospitality were funded by AIJAC. He also opposes Australia's vote in favour of United Nations General Assembly Resolution ES-10/22 calling for a ceasefire in the Gaza Strip during Gaza war and called it "woefully inadequate" and "weak and appalling”.

In November 2024, Birmingham announced his intention to retire and resign from the Senate. His Senate term was not due to expire until 2028. He officially resigned on 28 January 2025.

=== Ministerial appointments ===
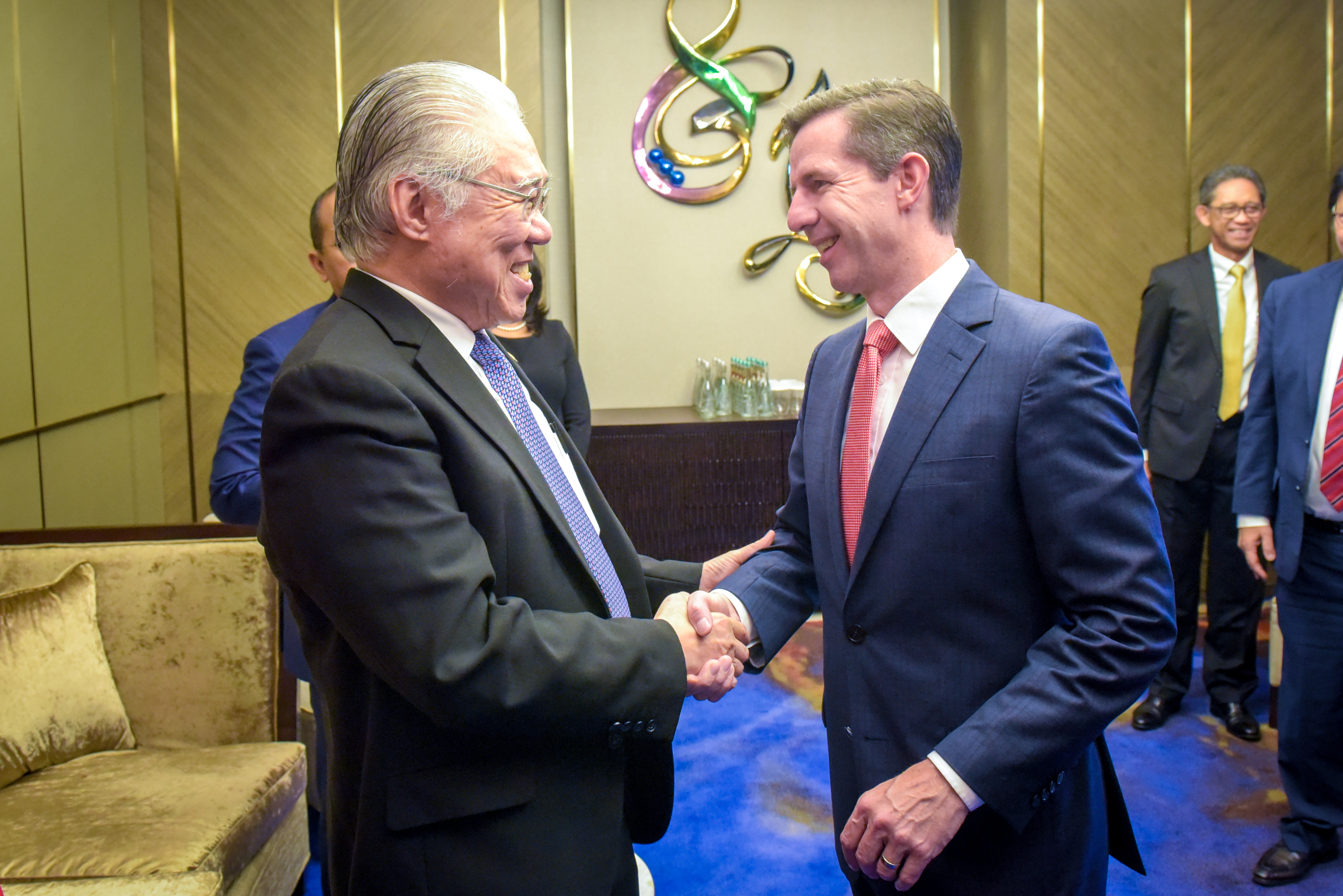
Birmingham and his Indonesian counterpart Enggartiasto Lukita at the signing of the Indonesia–Australia Comprehensive Economic Partnership Agreement in March 2019

Following the 2013 federal election, Birmingham served in the Abbott Ministry as a parliamentary secretary to the Minister for the Environment and from September 2013 until December 2014; when he was appointed as the Assistant Minister for Education and Training. He became the Minister for Education and Training in the First Turnbull Ministry in September 2015. Upon the installment of the Morrison Ministry in August 2018, he became the Minister for Trade, Tourism and Investment.

On 30 October 2020, Birmingham was appointed as Leader of the Government in the Senate and Minister for Finance.

== Political views ==
Birmingham is a member of the moderate or liberal wing of the Liberal Party, and was regarded as a key backer of Malcolm Turnbull in the 2015 leadership contest. According to Andrew Tillett, writing in The Australian Financial Review in August 2019, the retirement of Christopher Pyne saw Birmingham "assume the mantle as the most senior moderate" in the party. In 2021, Nine Entertainment journalist James Massola identified Birmingham as the leader of the party's "Moderate/Modern Liberal" faction in the Morrison government. In 2025, he is also seen as a moderate figure in the Liberal Party of Australia, calling the results of the 2025 Australian federal election "diabolical" for the Liberal Party, and calling on the party to adopt more socially progressive positions, such as embracing gender quotas.

== Post-politics ==
In February 2025, Birmingham joined ANZ Bank as its head of Asia Pacific engagement and head of their South Australian branch.

In August 2025, Birmingham left his job at ANZ and joined the Australian Banking Association, succeeding Anna Bligh as chief executive officer.

== Personal life ==
Birmingham is married to his former campaign manager Courtney Morcombe, who was the chief of staff to former South Australian premier Steven Marshall. The couple have two daughters.

In a 2013 survey of Australian federal politics, Birmingham was one of only four MPs and senators to publicly identify as atheist.

Birmingham supports the Adelaide Crows in the Australian Football League.

Parliament of Australia
Preceded by Jeannie Ferris	Senator for South Australia; 2007–2025	Succeeded by Leah Blyth
Political offices
Preceded by Mathias Cormann	Minister for Finance; 2020–2022	Succeeded by Katy Gallagher
Preceded by Mathias Cormann	Leader of the Government in the Senate; 2020–2022	Succeeded by Penny Wong
Preceded by Steven Ciobo	Minister for Trade, Tourism and Investment; 2018–2020	Succeeded by Dan Tehan
Preceded by Mitch Fifield	Deputy Leader of the Government in the Senate; 2018–2020	Succeeded by Michaelia Cash
Preceded by Christopher Pyne	Minister for Education and Training; 2015–2018	Succeeded by Dan Tehan
Preceded by Sussan Ley as Assistant Minister for Education	Assistant Minister for Education and Training; 2014–2015	Ministry abolished
