= Len Hamilton =

Australian politician (1899–1987)

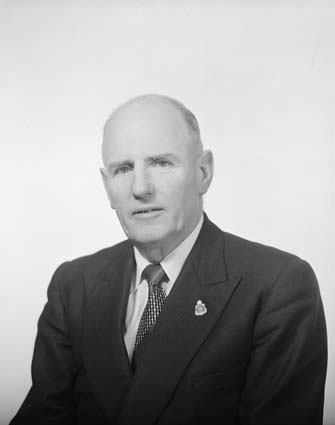

Member of the Australian Parliament for Swan
- In office 28 September 1946 – 10 December 1949
- Preceded by: Don Mountjoy
- Succeeded by: Bill Grayden

Member of the Australian Parliament for Canning
- In office 10 December 1949 – 2 November 1961
- Preceded by: New seat
- Succeeded by: Neil McNeill

Personal details
- Born: 7 July 1899 Jarrahdale, Western Australia
- Died: 31 May 1987 (aged 87)
- Party: Australian Country Party
- Occupation: Farmer

Leonard William Hamilton (7 July 1899 – 31 May 1987) was an Australian politician. Born in Jarrahdale, Western Australia, he was educated at Perth Boys School before becoming a wheat and sugar farmer. He served in the military from 1917 to 1920 and from 1940 to 1945. In 1946, he was elected to the Australian House of Representatives as the Country Party member for Swan, defeating Labor MP Don Mountjoy. In 1949, he transferred to the new seat of Canning, where he remained until his retirement in 1961. Hamilton later served as President of the Western Australian branch of the Country Party. He died in 1987.

== Early life ==
Hamilton was born on 7 July 1899 in Jarrahdale, Western Australia. He was educated at Perth Boys' School and passed his junior certificate, but left school at a young age to work as a clerk, initially with a private business and later with the Public Works Department. He began an apprenticeship as a fitter at the Midland Railway Workshops in 1915.

In July 1917, Hamilton enlisted in the Australian Imperial Force (AIF). He served as a sapper with the 9th Field Company of the Australian Engineers, leaving Australia in March 1918 and returning in July 1919. He attained the rank of lance corporal. After returning from the war he completed his apprenticeship and work as an engineer until 1927.

Hamilton subsequently settled in Beacon, Western Australia, where he established a wheat and sheep farm. He served on the Mount Marshall Road Board, including as vice-chairman for three years and chairman for one year. He was also a founding member of the Wheatgrowers' Union and held various offices in the union.

In May 1940, Hamilton enlisted in the Royal Australian Air Force (RAAF) as an ordinary aircraftman. He trained as an instructor at the No. 1 Flying Training School RAAF in Victoria and was subsequently stationed in Victor Harbor, South Australia, and Geraldton, Western Australia. In 1942 he was transferred to the No. 5 Aircraft Depot RAAF in Wagga Wagga, New South Wales. He later spent time with No. 23 Squadron RAAF and with No. 82 Wing RAAF at Balikpapan in the Dutch East Indies. He was discharged from the RAAF in November 1945 with the rank of squadron leader.

== Politics ==
Hamilton first ran for parliament at the 1939 Western Australian state election, standing unsuccessfully as an independent in the Legislative Assembly seat of Mount Marshall. Later in 1939, fellow independent Claude Barker resigned from the Legislative Assembly and endorsed Hamilton as his successor in the neighbouring seat of Irwin-Moore. However, Hamilton declined to stand at the by-election.

Hamilton was elected to the House of Representatives at the 1946 federal election, winning the seat of Swan for the Country Party from the incumbent Australian Labor Party MP Don Mountjoy. Following a redistribution, he transferred to the new seat of Canning at the 1949 election.

In 1956, Hamilton was appointed a parliamentary secretary in the Menzies government. He was attached to the Department of the Interior and Department of Works from 1956 to 1958 and the Postmaster-General's Department from 1959 to 1961. He also served on the Joint Standing Committee on Constitutional Review from 1956 to 1960.

== Personal life ==
In 1921, Hamilton married Adelaide Hammond, with whom he had four children. He was granted a divorce in 1947 on the grounds of spousal abandonment.

Hamilton died on 31 May 1987, aged 87.

Parliament of Australia
| Preceded by Don Mountjoy | Member for Swan; 1946–1949 | Succeeded by Bill Grayden |
| New seat | Member for Canning; 1949–1961 | Succeeded by Neil McNeill |
