= No. 5 Aircraft Depot RAAF =

- Active: 1942–1945
- Country: Australia
- Branch: RAAF
- Garrison/HQ: RAAF Station Forest Hill

No. 5 Aircraft Depot RAAF was formed in 1942 at RAAF Station Forest Hill near Wagga Wagga, New South Wales, Australia. The unit handled the major maintenance work on aircraft including the Bristol Beaufort, Bristol Beaufighter, Lockheed Ventura and the B-25 Mitchell. After the war, No 5 Aircraft Depot was disbanded.
