= Angie Bell =

Australian politician (born 1968)

Angie Bell MP

Member of the Australian Parliament for Moncrieff
- Incumbent
- Assumed office 18 May 2019
- Preceded by: Steven Ciobo

Personal details
- Born: 11 July 1968 (age 58) Adelaide, South Australia
- Party: Liberal (LNP)
- Education: Gawler High School
- Occupation: Musician and retail manager

Angie Marion Bell (born 11 July 1968) is an Australian politician who has been a member of the House of Representatives since the 2019 federal election, representing the Division of Moncrieff in Queensland. She is a member of the Liberal National Party of Queensland and sits with the Liberal Party in federal parliament.

== Early life ==
Bell was born in Adelaide. She attended Gawler High School, where she learned the tenor saxophone and came to the attention of jazz musician Don Burrows. She subsequently won a scholarship from Rotary International to study music in Denmark. When she returned to Australia she enrolled in the Elder Conservatorium of Music, studying jazz, saxophone, and voice.

Prior to entering politics, Bell worked as a professional musician for 35 years. She also worked as a sales agent across several Australian states before settling in Queensland in 2002, where she worked with the National Retail Association as a consultant and workplace trainer. From 2010 she worked for Paint Place as visual merchandising manager (2010–2015) and national business development manager (2015–2018). Bell attended Griffith University as a mature-age student, completing a graduate certificate in marketing. In 2014 she wrote a book on rebranding and marketing for small businesses.

== Politics ==
Bell joined the Liberal National Party of Queensland (LNP) at the age of 45. She served as president of LNP Women Queensland from 2017 to 2019.

In April 2019, Bell won LNP preselection for the Division of Moncrieff, replacing the retiring MP Steven Ciobo. According to The Australian, she defeated eight other candidates in an "upset victory". She retained Moncrieff for the Liberals at the 2019 federal election, with a small positive swing to the party.

Bell is a member of the Moderate/Modern Liberal faction of the Liberal Party.

== Personal life ==
Bell is in a long-term relationship with her partner Ros, who has four adult children. She is the first openly gay woman to represent a major party in the House of Representatives, the second overall after independent Kerryn Phelps, and the fifth gay woman in federal parliament.

Bell supports the Gold Coast Suns in the Australian Football League (AFL).

Parliament of Australia
Preceded by Steven Ciobo	Member for Moncrieff; 2019–present	Incumbent
