= William Carroll (Australian politician) =

Australian politician (1872–1936)

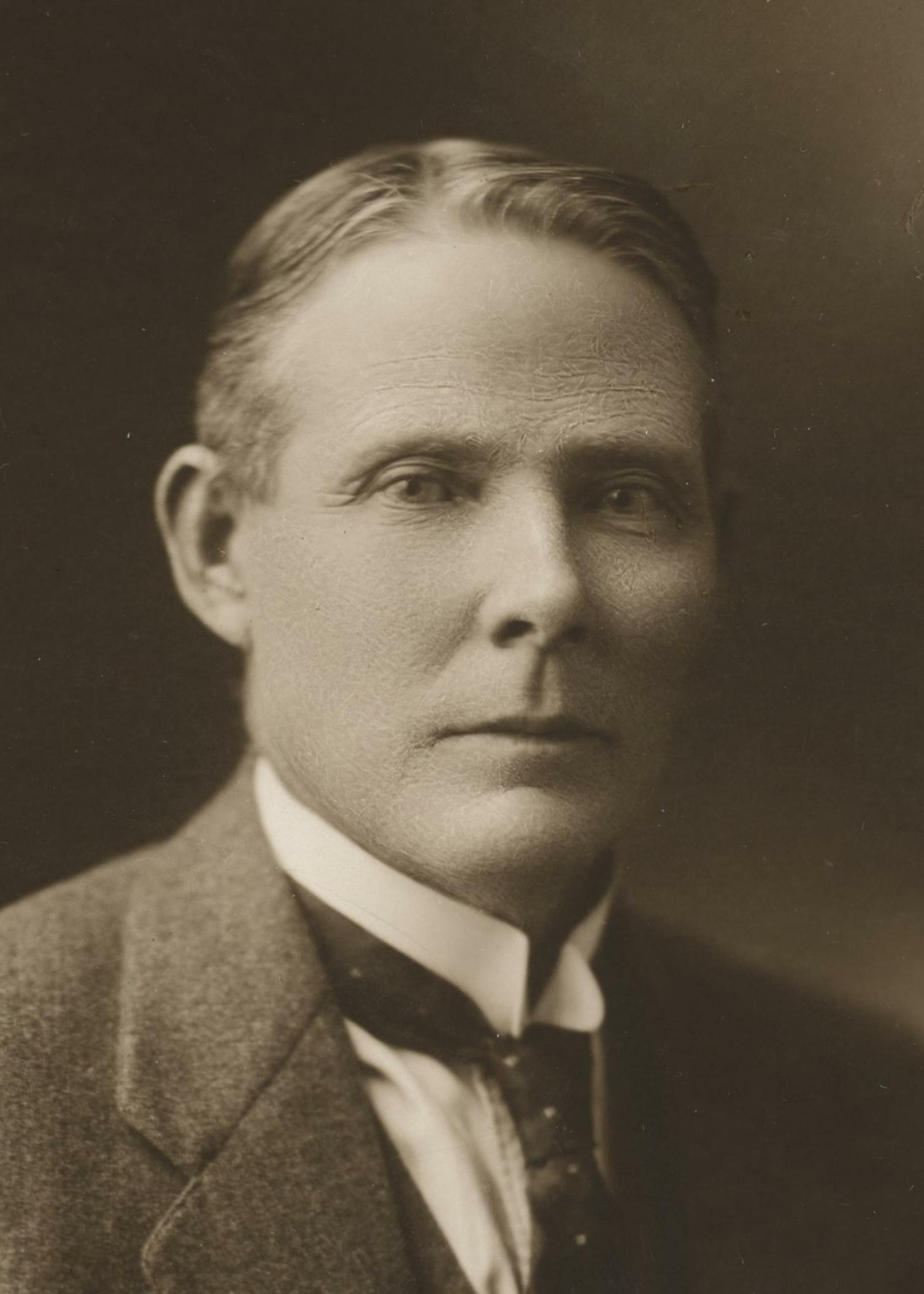

Senator for Western Australia
- In office 1 July 1926 – 30 May 1936
- Succeeded by: Thomas Marwick

Member of the Western Australian Legislative Council
- In office 11 August 1923 – 21 May 1924
- Constituency: East Province

Personal details
- Born: 3 January 1872 Garvoc, Victoria, Australia
- Died: 30 May 1936 (aged 64) Concord, New South Wales, Australia
- Party: Country
- Spouse: Annie Nicholson (m. 1898)
- Occupation: Farmer

William Carroll (3 January 1872 – 30 May 1936) was an Australian politician. Born in Garvoc, Victoria, he was educated at Horsham before moving to Western Australia during the gold rush to become a miner, and subsequently became a farmer at Tammin. He was General Secretary of the Western Australian Primary Producers' Association, and was a member of the Western Australian Legislative Council from 1923 to 1924. In 1925, he was elected to the Australian Senate as a Country Party Senator for Western Australia. He remained in the Senate until his death in 1936, necessitating the appointment of Thomas Marwick to replace him.

== Early life ==
Carroll was born on 3 January 1872 in Garvoc, Victoria. He was the second of eight surviving children born to Mary (née Larkin) and James Carroll; his father was born in Scotland and his mother in Ireland.

Carroll grew up on his father's farm near Horsham and attended a local state school; his father was also the secretary of the Wimmera Shire Council. After leaving school he farmed wheat in the Wimmera until 1898, when he was forced by the Federation Drought to abandon farming and move to Melbourne in search of employment.

In May 1898, Carroll moved to Western Australia, initially living in Fremantle where he worked as a commercial traveller. He then moved to the Eastern Goldfields and worked as a gold miner. In 1903 he was nearly killed in an accident in the Perseverance mine at Boulder, "when a rope snapped and he was buried in a vat of crushed ore". He also worked in the Lancefield gold mine at Laverton. Carroll was appointed as a justice of the peace in 1907. He returned to farming in 1910, buying a property in Tammin in Western Australia's Wheatbelt.

== Politics ==
Carroll became active in politics as a member of the Farmers' and Settlers' Association; his farm became a centre for political meetings. He was elected to the association's executive council in 1915. He first stood for parliament at the 1917 Western Australian state election, unsuccessfully contesting the Legislative Assembly seat of Avon.

At the 1925 federal election, Carroll was elected to a six-year term beginning on 1 July 1926. He stood for the Country Party on a joint coalition ticket with the Nationalist Party. He was re-elected at the 1931 election, but died in office in 1936. The casual vacancy caused by his death was filled by Thomas Marwick.

== Personal life ==
Carroll married Annie Jane Nicholson in 1898; the couple had three sons and daughter. He suffered from poor health and settled in Sydney after parliament relocated to Canberra in 1927. He died at his home in Concord on 31 May 1936, aged 64. He was cremated in Sydney, with his ashes sent to Western Australia and scattered by plane over Perth Water.
