= Don Mountjoy =

Australian politician

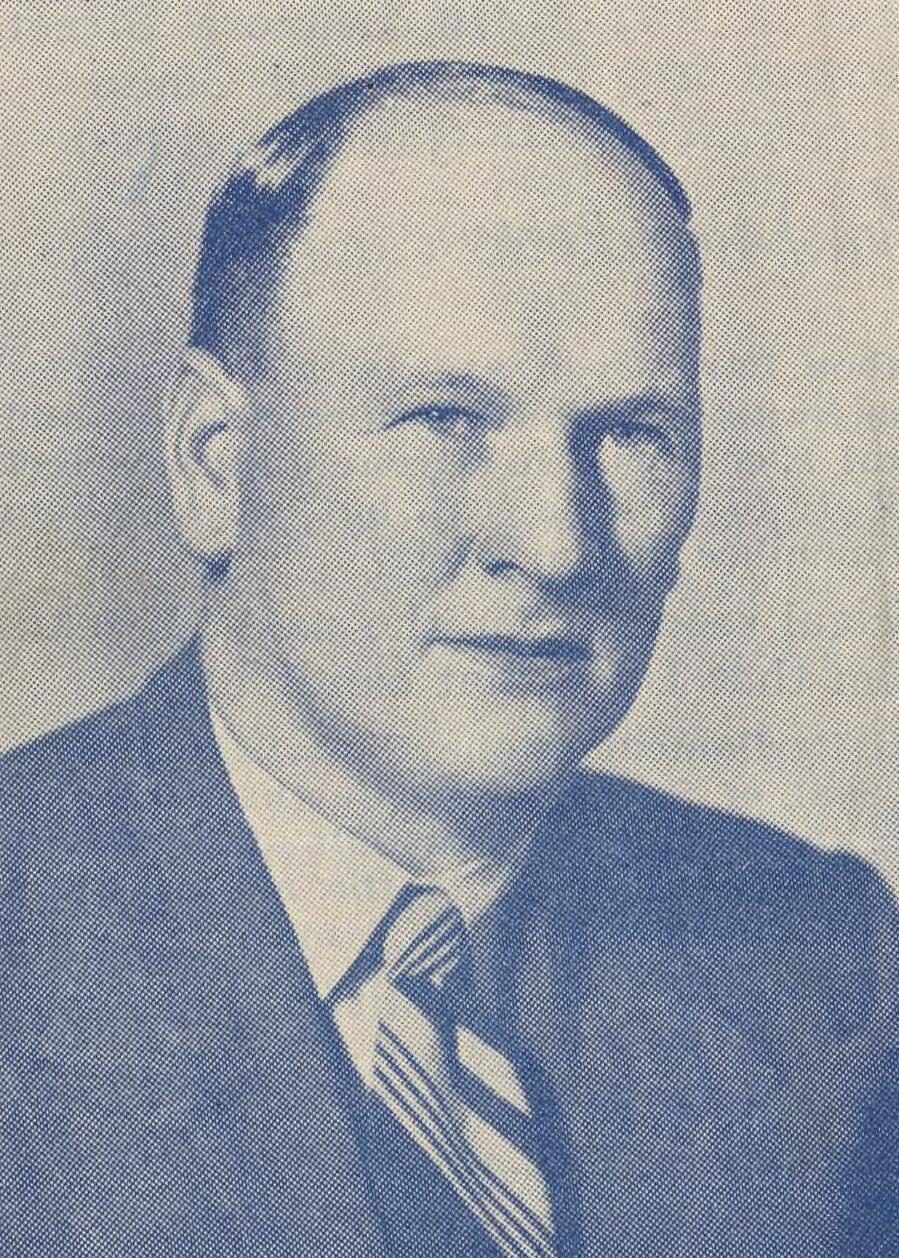
- Mountjoy in 1948

Member of the Australian Parliament for Swan
- In office 21 August 1943 – 28 September 1946
- Preceded by: Thomas Marwick
- Succeeded by: Len Hamilton

Personal details
- Born: 19 October 1906 Middle Swan, Western Australia
- Died: 8 January 1988 (aged 81)
- Party: Labor
- Occupation: Railwayman

Donald Alfred Mountjoy (19 October 1906 – 8 January 1988) was an Australian politician. He was a member of the House of Representatives from 1943 to 1946, representing the Western Australian seat of Swan for the Australian Labor Party (ALP). He was a railway worker before entering politics and later served on the Council for Scientific and Industrial Research.

== Early life ==
Mountjoy was born on 19 October 1906 in Middle Swan, Western Australia. He was the son of Eliza Jane Passmore (née Hooper) and David Henry Mountjoy. He attended state schools at Middle Swan and Midland, leaving school at the age of 14.

Mountjoy worked for periods as a vineyard hand and harvester after leaving school. He later joined Western Australian Government Railways, and in 1937 was working as a shunter at York in which capacity he testified before an arbitration tribunal. He later worked as a guard based at West Midland and was active in the Amalgamated Society of Railway Employees, serving on the state executive.

== Politics ==
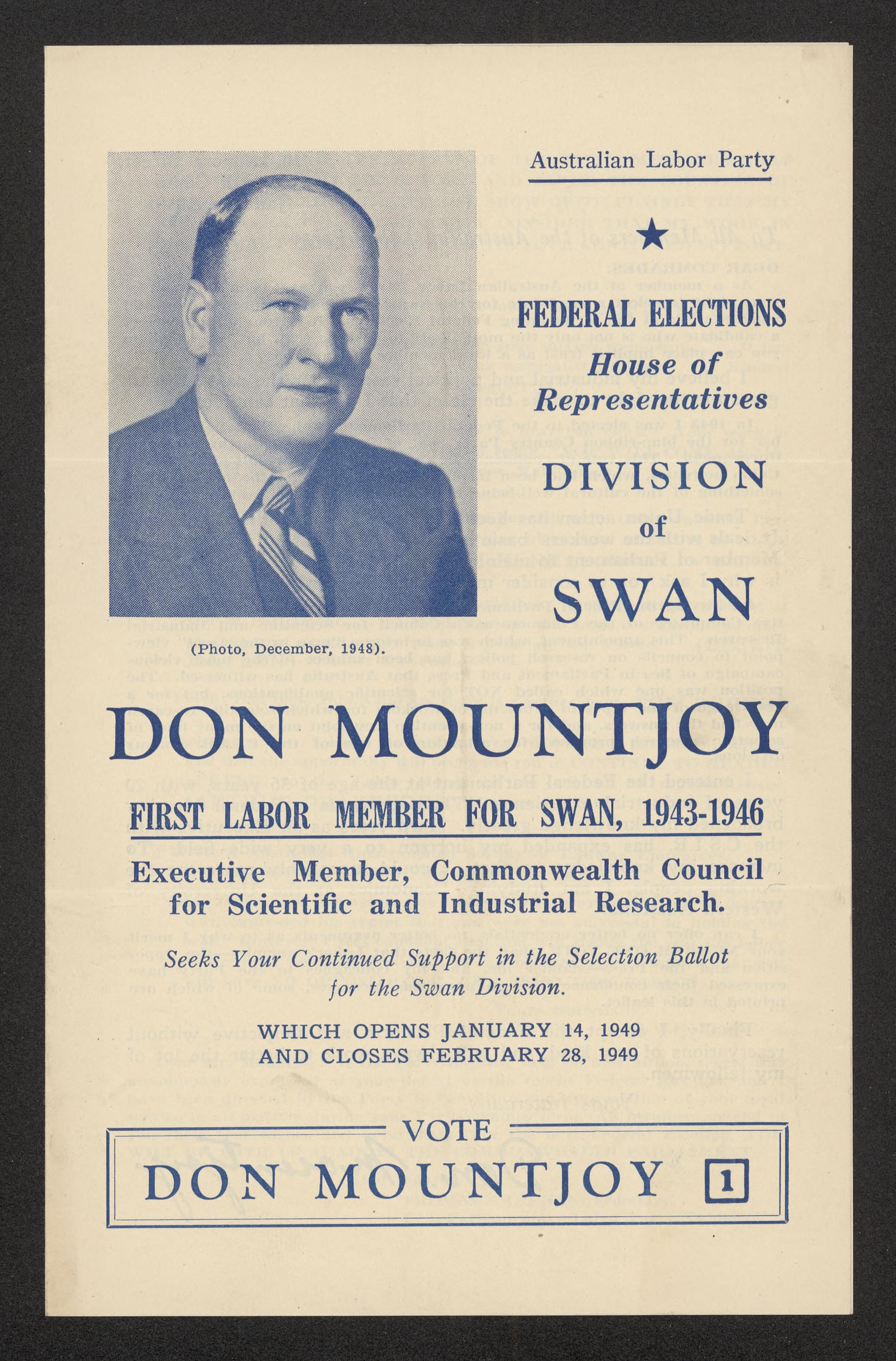
Campaign material used by Mountjoy in 1949

In January 1943, Mountjoy won ALP preselection for the Division of Swan, at which time he was secretary of the party's Midland district council. He won Swan for the ALP at the 1943 federal election, defeating the incumbent Country Party MP Thomas Marwick.

In parliament, Mountjoy supported the Curtin government's plans for post-war reconstruction, particularly the nationalisation of the banking sector. In 1945 he publicly criticised the anti-communist Sane Democracy League and called for a government investigation of its activities. In response, deputy opposition leader Eric Harrison accused Mountjoy of misusing parliamentary privilege and implied he was a covert communist, citing the fact that his brother Wilfred Mountjoy had stood as a Communist Party candidate on several occasions.

Mountjoy was defeated after a single term at the 1946 election, narrowly losing Swan to the Country Party candidate Len Hamilton following the distribution of independent candidate Bill Grayden's preferences.

== Later life ==
In November 1946, months after his parliamentary defeat, Mountjoy was appointed by the Chifley government to a three-year term on the executive of the Council for Scientific and Industrial Research (CSIR). His appointment was criticised by the opposition on the grounds that he was not academically qualified, was closely affiliated with the Communist Party, and that the position had not been offered to a returned soldier. John Dedman, the minister responsible for the CSIR, said in response that Mountjoy was not a communist, had taken an active interest in the CSIR's activities during his parliamentary term, particularly on agricultural matters, and that there was no requirement for all members of the body to hold university degrees.

In 1948, Mountjoy announced that he had enrolled at the University of Western Australia to study economics as a mature-aged student. The following year he was an unsuccessful candidate for ALP preselection in Swan, losing to Harry Webb. He also unsuccessfully sought the party's state secretaryship.

Mountjoy later returned to working on the railways and in 1954 was a candidate for general secretary of the State Railway Employees' Union. He died on 8 January 1988, aged 81.

Parliament of Australia
Preceded by Thomas Marwick	Member for Swan; 1943–1946	Succeeded by Len Hamilton
