= Kathy Sullivan (Australian politician) =

Australian politician

The Honourable Kate Sullivan AM
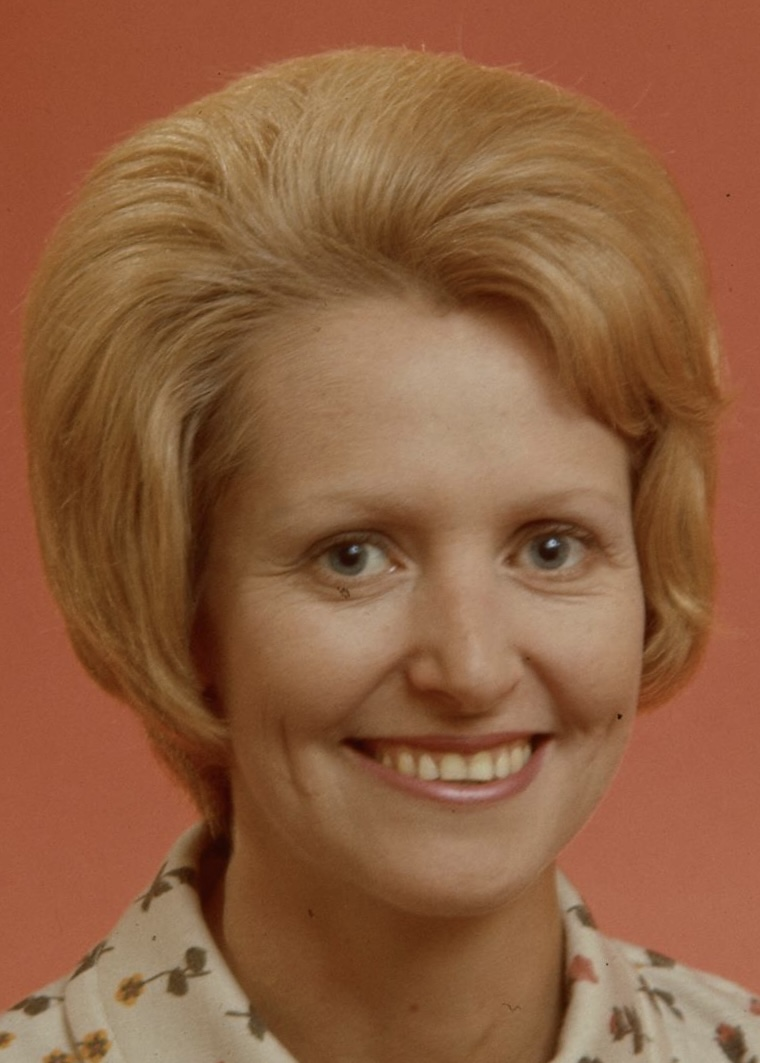
- Sullivan in 1974

Senator for Queensland
- In office 18 May 1974 – 5 November 1984
- Succeeded by: Warwick Parer

Member of the Australian Parliament for Moncrieff
- In office 1 December 1984 – 8 October 2001
- Preceded by: New seat
- Succeeded by: Steven Ciobo

Personal details
- Born: Kathryn Jean Martin; 8 March 1942 (age 84) Brisbane, Queensland, Australia
- Party: Liberal
- Spouses: Donald Maher (m. 1965; div. 1969) Jim Gray (m. 1975; div. 1978) Bob Sullivan (m. 1983; died 2008)
- Education: University of Queensland
- Occupation: Teacher

Kathryn Jean Martin Sullivan AM (born 8 March 1942) is an Australian former politician. A member of the Liberal Party, she was a Senator for Queensland from 1974 to 1984 and a member of the House of Representatives from 1984 to 2001, holding the seat of Moncrieff. She broke Dorothy Tangney's record for the longest period of service in federal parliament by a woman, which was later surpassed by Bronwyn Bishop. She was the first woman to have served in both houses of parliament.

== Early life ==
Sullivan was born Kathryn Jean Martin on 8 March 1942 in Brisbane, Queensland. She was the second of two daughters born to Edna (née Sproul) and Ian Martin. Her mother was a nurse and post office worker and her father was a bank officer. She grew up in country Queensland, attending primary schools in Mount Morgan, Kingaroy, Humpybong, and Camp Hill. Her secondary education was completed at Somerville House in Brisbane. She went on to complete a Bachelor of Arts (Hons.) degree in political science at the University of Queensland.

== Politics ==
Martin joined the Young Liberals in 1960 during her first year at university. She served as state secretary in 1961 and vice-president in 1963, and had received life membership by the time she graduated.

=== Senate (1974–1984) ===
Martin was elected to the Senate at the 1974 federal election, a double dissolution. She was ranked in fifth position on the Liberal Party's joint ticket with the Country Party. At the time of her preselection she was asked to use the name "Kathy" rather than her full name as it was "friendlier", and also "to stop wearing knee-high boots and smoking cigars".

In April 1975, Martin was chosen as the Liberal Party's assistant whip in the Senate. She was "a linchpin in keeping the Opposition senators in line" during the 1975 constitutional crisis, and retained the position after the Coalition won the 1975 federal election. She resigned as assistant whip in February 1977 after crossing the floor with nine other Liberal senators to oppose a procedural motion to expedite the government's constitutional amendment bills. Martin subsequently led the "No" campaign in Queensland against the simultaneous elections amendment, which was the only one of four not to pass. Her relationship with Prime Minister Malcolm Fraser deteriorated as a result and "destroyed her prospects for promotion while he remained party leader".

Prior to the 1983 election, Martin offered to resign her place on the Liberal Senate ticket in favour of Neville Bonner, who had been demoted to the third position. Her offer was rejected and Bonner unsuccessfully stood as an independent. In the last years of the Fraser government she had increasingly aligned herself with opposition to Fraser's leadership, supporting Andrew Peacock for the party leadership. Fraser resigned as leader after losing the 1983 election and was replaced by Peacock, who appointed Martin as Shadow Minister for Home Affairs and Administrative Services. She resigned from the Senate in November 1984 to seek a lower-house seat at the upcoming federal election, which followed an expansion in the number of House of Representatives seats. After her marriage the previous year she was known as Kathy Sullivan or Kathy Martin Sullivan.

In 2021, Sullivan stated that a male colleague sexually assaulted her in her office in about 1983 or 1984. She said that the party's leader Andrew Peacock "clearly didn't believe" her account of the incident when she informed him, and that it was "one of the most devastating experiences of my life". Sullivan made this allegation publicly known on 9 July 2021, almost three months after Peacock's death on 16 April.

=== House of Representatives (1984–2001) ===
At the 1984 election, Sullivan won the newly created Division of Moncrieff for the Liberal Party. She was the first woman to serve in both houses of federal parliament. She was also the first female Coalition MP to serve in the House since Kay Brownbill in 1969.

Sullivan was not retained in Andrew Peacock's shadow ministry after the 1984 election. She returned as a shadow parliamentary secretary in 1993 under John Hewson, holding the position until Hewson lost the leadership the following year. In the same year she received national attention when ALP Treasurer John Dawkins taunted her by calling her "sweetheart" in parliament, which outraged female MPs from Dawkins' own party. She returned to her former position as a deputy whip later in 1994, holding the position until the 1996 election. Sullivan hoped to become Speaker of the House of Representatives when the Coalition won the 1996 federal election, but was defeated by Bob Halverson in an internal ballot. She was instead elected to the speaker's panel. Following a ministerial reshuffle, Sullivan was appointed Parliamentary Secretary to the Minister for Foreign Affairs in October 1997. She held the position until February 2000 when she announced her decision not to re-contest her seat at the 2001 federal election.

She has been a vocal advocate for an increase in the number of women in parliament.

== Recognition ==
In 2003, Sullivan was made a Member of the Order of Australia, for service to the Parliament of Australia and to the community, particularly as an advocate for improved services and conditions affecting women.

According to a study by the Parliamentary Library, Sullivan crossed the floor 20 times during her career, the most out of any woman during the period from 1950 to 2019. Each of those occasions occurred during her service in the Senate.

== Personal life ==
From 1965 to 1969, Sullivan was married to Donald Maher. In 1972, he was sentenced to life in prison for the murder of a Brisbane hotel manager; he was released in 1987.

Sullivan re-married in 1975 to Jim Gray, continuing to use her maiden name in parliament. They divorced in 1978 and in 1983 she married Bob Sullivan, a former U.S. Marine. She was widowed in 2008.

After the conclusion of her political career, Sullivan has used the name "Kate" rather than "Kathy".

Parliament of Australia
New division	Member for Moncrieff; 1984–2001	Succeeded by Steven Ciobo
