= 1940 Swan by-election =

Australian federal by-election

21 December 1940
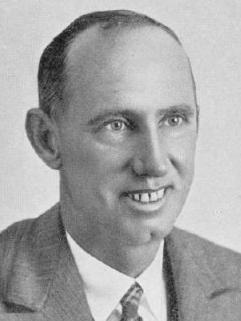

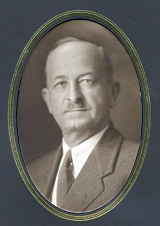
	First party	Second party
		ALP
Candidate	Thomas Marwick	Jim Dinan
Party	Country	Labor
Popular vote	12,354	16,729
Percentage	27.6%	37.4%
Swing	▼1.6pp	▲9.2pp
TPP	52.3%	47.3%
TPP swing	▼5.2pp	▲5.2pp
	Third party	Fourth party
		IND
Candidate	Percy Ferguson	Claude Barker
Party	Country	Independent
Popular vote	10,628	4,980
Percentage	23.8%	11.1%
Swing	▲23.8pp	▲11.1pp
MP before election
Henry Gregory
Country
Elected MP
Thomas Marwick
Country

A by-election was held for the Australian House of Representatives seat of Swan on 21 December 1940. This was triggered by the death of Country Party MP Henry Gregory.

The by-election was won by Country Party candidate Thomas Marwick, who had been a member of the Senate from 1936 to 1937.

== Results ==
Swan by-election, 1940
Party	Candidate	Votes	%	±%
Labor	Jim Dinan	16,729	37.4	+9.2
Country	Thomas Marwick	12,354	27.6	−1.6
Country	Percy Ferguson	10,628	23.8	+23.8
Independent	Claude Barker	4,980	11.1	+11.1
Total formal votes		44,691	98.5	
Informal votes		701	1.5	
Turnout		45,392	84.6	
Two-party-preferred result
Country	Thomas Marwick	23,537	52.3	−5.2
Labor	Jim Dinan	21,154	47.3	+5.2
Country hold		Swing	−5.2	
