= Thomas Marwick =

Australian politician

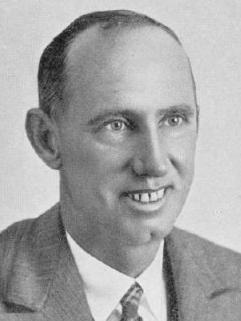

Senator for Western Australia
- In office 19 August 1936 – 22 October 1937
- Preceded by: William Carroll
- Succeeded by: James Cunningham

Member of the Australian Parliament for Swan
- In office 21 December 1940 – 21 August 1943
- Preceded by: Henry Gregory
- Succeeded by: Don Mountjoy

Personal details
- Born: 29 April 1895 York, Western Australia
- Died: 3 April 1960 (aged 64) Subiaco, Western Australia
- Party: Country (1936–43)
- Spouse: Lilian McInerney (m. 1920)
- Relations: Warren Marwick (father)
- Occupation: Farmer

Thomas William Marwick (29 April 1895 – 3 April 1960) was an Australian farmer and politician. He was a member of the Country Party and served both as a Senator for Western Australia (1936–1937) and as a member of the House of Representatives for the seat of Swan (1940–1943).

== Early life ==
Marwick was born on 29 April 1895 in York, Western Australia. He was the son of Susan (née Collins) and Warren Marwick, a farmer who was elected to the Western Australian Legislative Council in 1910. He was educated at a Catholic school in York and later studied engineering at the Perth Technical School. He left school in 1911, spending periods in Brookton and York before taking up farming in Greenhills. Marwick enlisted in the Australian Imperial Force in July 1916 but received a medical discharge two months later. He was a member of the York Road Board, serving as chairman for a period, and also represented York on the wheat executive of the Primary Producers' Association (PPA).

== Politics ==
In 1935, Marwick became a vice-president of the political section of the PPA. He was appointed to the Senate on 19 August 1936 to fill a casual vacancy caused by the death of William Carroll. He was a strong advocate for primary producers and supporter of states' rights, and publicly criticised the Commonwealth Grants Commission as biased against Western Australia.

Marwick was defeated for re-election to the Senate at the 1937 federal election. At the 1940 election he unsuccessfully stood for the House of Representatives in the seat of Swan, as one of two endorsed Country Party candidates. The incumbent Country MP, 80-year-old Henry Gregory, won re-election but died in office two months later. Marwick won the resulting by-election, becoming the first West Australian to have served in both houses of federal parliament. He was not declared elected until 3 January 1941, following the distribution of preferences.

During World War II Marwick served on the Joint Committee on Rural Industries and the Joint Committee on Prices. He was defeated after a single term at the 1943 election by the Australian Labor Party (ALP) candidate Don Mountjoy. He was endorsed by the Country Party as a candidate for the 1944 Swan state by-election, but withdrew in favour of Hurtle Prater who was defeated.

== Personal life ==
Marwick married in Lilian Isabel McInerney on 28 July 1920. He died at St John of God Subiaco Hospital on 3 April 1960, aged 64, having retired from farming ten years earlier.

Parliament of Australia
Preceded by Henry Gregory	Member for Swan; 1940–1943	Succeeded by Don Mountjoy
