= Division of Moncrieff =

Australian federal electoral division

Coordinates: 28.008°S 153.385°E

Moncrieff Australian House of Representatives Division
- Interactive map of boundaries since the 2019 federal election
- Created: 1984
- MP: Angie Bell
- Party: Liberal (Note: Member of the Liberal National Party of Queensland sitting with the federal parliamentary Liberal Party.)
- Namesake: Gladys Moncrieff
- Electors: 125,771 (2025)
- Area: 100 km^{2} (38.6 sq mi)
- Demographic: Provincial
Electorates around Moncrieff:
Wright	Fadden	South Pacific Ocean
Wright	Moncrieff	South Pacific Ocean
Wright	McPherson	South Pacific Ocean

The Division of Moncrieff is an Australian Electoral Division in Queensland. The current MP is Angie Bell of the Liberal Party.

== Geography ==
Since 1984, federal electoral division boundaries in Australia have been determined at redistributions by a redistribution committee appointed by the Australian Electoral Commission. Redistributions occur for the boundaries of divisions in a particular state, and they occur every seven years, or sooner if a state's representation entitlement changes or when divisions of a state are malapportioned.

== History ==
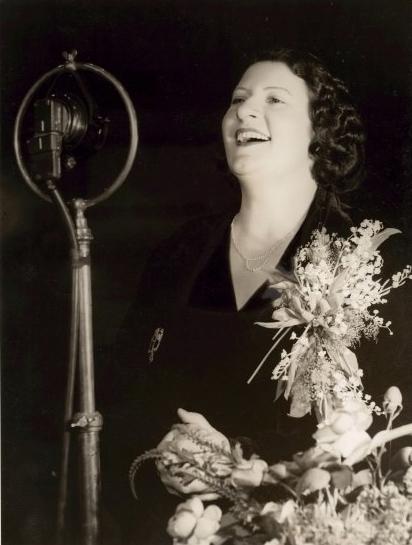
Gladys Moncrieff, the division's namesake

The division was created in 1984 and is named after Gladys Moncrieff, an Australian singer who resided in the Gold Coast.

Moncrieff is based on Surfers Paradise and the central portion of the Gold Coast. While the Gold Coast has always been a rather conservative area, Surfers Paradise is considered particularly conservative even by Gold Coast standards. As a result, Moncrieff has been a comfortably safe Liberal seat for its entire existence. Indeed, most of the area has been represented by centre-right MPs without interruption since 1906; the Surfers Paradise area was part of Moreton before 1949, and then part of McPherson from 1949 to 1984. The Liberals have never won less than 58 percent of the two-party vote, and from 1993 until 2019 won enough primary votes to retain the seat without the need for preferences.

For years, it was one of the safest Coalition seats in Australia and one of the safest for either side of politics in Queensland.

Although Labor to date has never won Moncrieff, it did win the primary vote in 1984 and 1987. This was due to the Liberal and National parties fielding candidates against each other and therefore splitting the anti-Labor primary vote. On both those occasions, however, the Liberals retained the seat after National preferences flowed overwhelmingly to them.

In 2022, sitting Liberal National MP Angie Bell was reelected with less than 50% of the primary vote, the first time that a non-Labor candidate has done so without the presence of a second major party non-Labor candidate. In 2025, Bell suffered a further swing against her, with her majority falling to eight percent, the first time the seat has not been safe against Labor since 1990.

== Members ==
Image	Member	Party	Term	Notes
	Kathy Sullivan (1942–)	Liberal	1 December 1984 – 8 October 2001	Previously a member of the Senate. Retired
	Steven Ciobo (1974–)	Liberal	10 November 2001 – 19 July 2010	Served as minister under Turnbull and Morrison. Retired
	Steven Ciobo (1974–)	Liberal National	19 July 2010 – 11 April 2019	Served as minister under Turnbull and Morrison. Retired
	Angie Bell (1968–)	Liberal National	18 May 2019 – present	Incumbent

== Election results ==
2025 Australian federal election: Moncrieff
Party	Candidate	Votes	%	±%
Liberal National	Angie Bell	42,047	41.91	−4.03
Labor	Blair Stuart	24,536	24.46	+3.65
Greens	Sally Spain	9,558	9.53	−2.54
Independent	Nicole Arrowsmith	7,641	7.62	+7.62
One Nation	Glen Wadsworth	5,894	5.87	−1.24
Trumpet of Patriots	Vic Naicker	4,065	4.05	+3.39
People First	Natasha Szorkovszky	3,547	3.54	+3.54
Family First	Ruth Fea	1,645	1.64	+1.64
Independent	Waddah Weld Ali	1,393	1.39	+1.39
Total formal votes		100,326	93.16	−1.06
Informal votes		7,362	6.84	+1.06
Turnout		107,688	85.66	+0.63
Two-party-preferred result
Liberal National	Angie Bell	58,991	58.80	−2.39
Labor	Blair Stuart	41,335	41.20	+2.39
Liberal National hold		Swing	−2.39	
