= 2004 Australian Senate election =

Australian federal election results

2004 Australian Senate elections
- 9 October 2004

40 of the 76 seats in the Australian Senate 39 seats needed for a majority
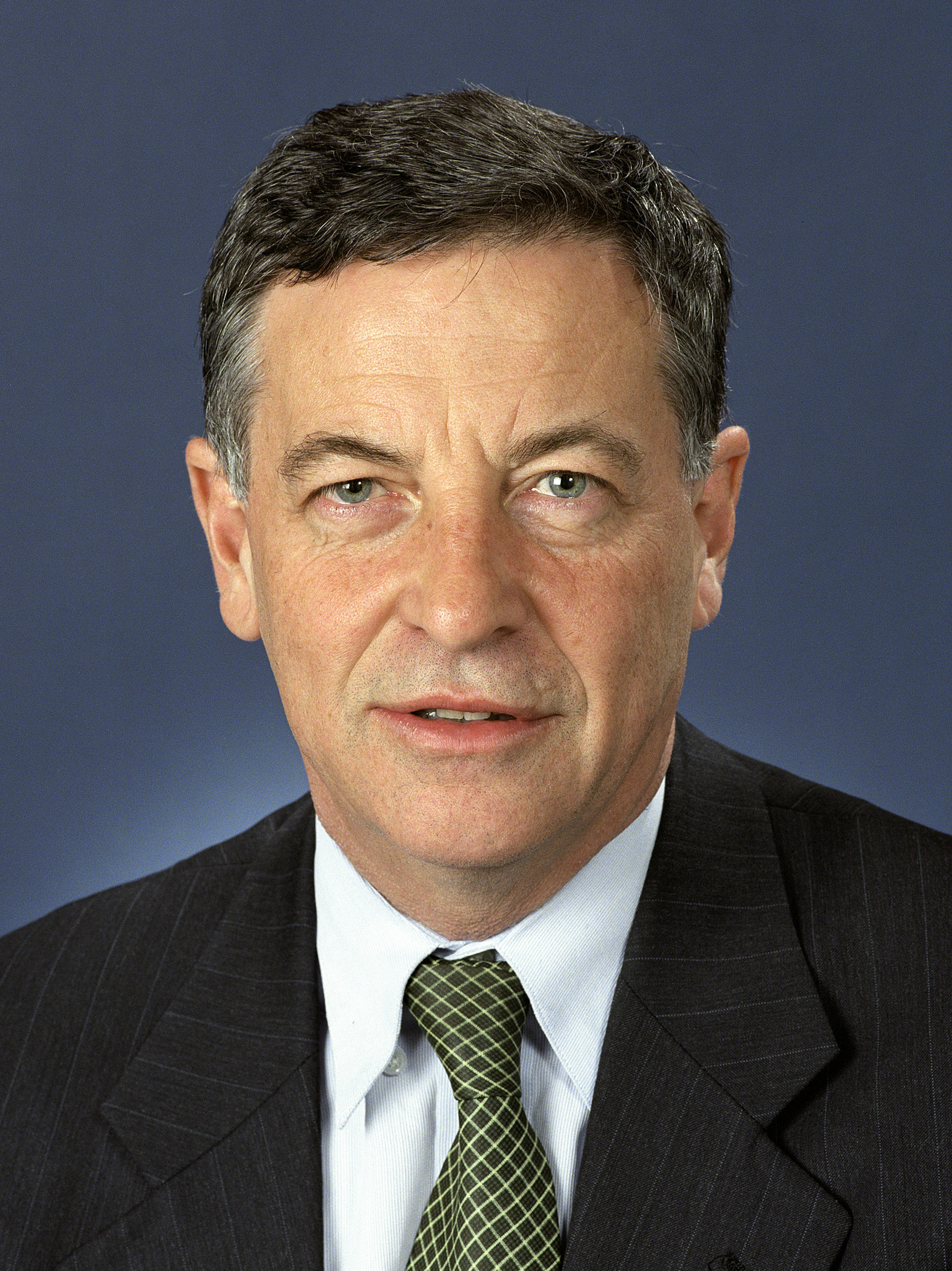

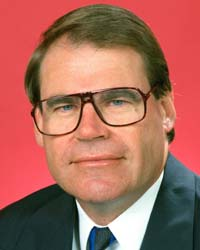

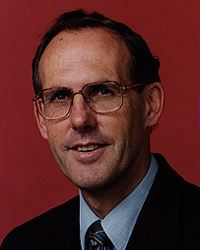

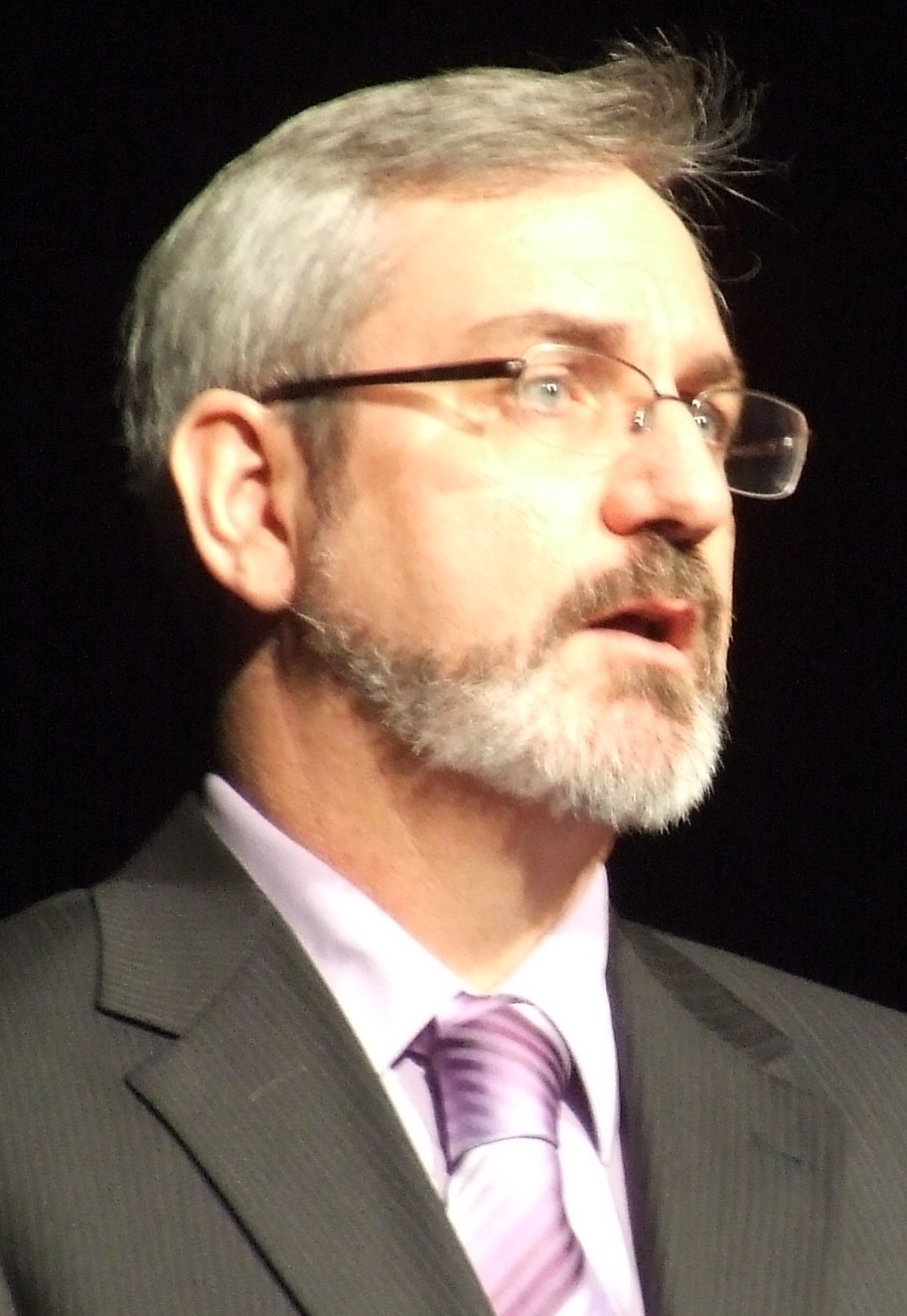
	First party	Second party	Third party
Leader	Robert Hill	John Faulkner	Bob Brown
Party	Liberal–National Coalition	Labor	Greens
Leader since	3 April 1990	19 March 1996	de facto
Leader's seat	South Australia	New South Wales	Tasmania
Seats before	34	28	2
Seats after	39	28	4
Seat change	▲5	Steady	▲2
Popular vote	5,390,084	4,186,715	916,431
Percentage	45.09%	35.02%	7.67%
Swing	▲3.26%	▲0.70%	▲2.73%
	Fourth party	Fifth party
Leader	Andrew Bartlett	Steve Fielding
Party	Democrats	Family First
Leader since	5 October 2002
Leader's seat	Queensland	Victoria
Seats before	8	1
Seats won	0	1
Seats after	4	1
Seat change	▼4	▲1
Popular vote	250,373	210,567
Percentage	2.09%	1.76%
Swing	▼5.16%	▲1.76%
- Senators elected in the 2004 federal election
Leader of the Senate before election
Robert Hill
Liberal/National coalition
Elected Leader of the Senate
Robert Hill
Liberal/National coalition

The following tables show state-by-state results in the Australian Senate at the 2004 federal election. Senators total 37 coalition (33 Liberal, 3 coalition National, 1 CLP), 28 Labor, 4 Green, 1 Family First, 2 non-coalition National and 4 Democrats. Senator terms are six years (three for territories), and took their seats from 1 July 2005, except the territories who took their seats immediately. This is the most recent time a Government has had a majority in the senate.

== Preference deals ==
The Greens directed preferences to the Democrats and Labor ahead of the Coalition, Family First and the Christian Democrats. In exchange, the Democrats preferenced the Greens ahead of both major parties and Labor preferenced the Greens and Democrats first in every state and territory except for Tasmania, where Labor preferenced Family First ahead of the Greens and Democrats, and Victoria, where Labor preferenced Family First, Democratic Labor and the Christian Democrats ahead of the Greens and the Democrats.

The Family First Party preferenced the Democrats and the Christian Democrats ahead of both major parties. In exchange, the Democrats preferenced Family First ahead of both the Greens and both major parties, while the Christian Democrats also preferenced Family First highly. The Family First Party and the Coalition also preferenced each other ahead of Labor and the Greens.

One Nation was preferenced last by Labor, the Democrats, the Coalition and the Greens in every state, while the Greens was preferenced last by Family First, One Nation and the Christian Democrats in every state.

A full listing of preferences can be found here.

== Australia ==
Senate (STV GV) — Turnout 94.82% (CV) — Informal 3.75%
Party	Votes	%	±	Seats			
Party	Votes	%	±	Seats won	Not up	New total	Seat change
Liberal/National Coalition							
Liberal/National joint ticket	3,074,952	25.72	+1.85	6	6	12	▲1
Liberal	2,109,948	17.65	+1.96	13	11	24	▲2
National	163,261	1.37	−0.55	1	1	2	▲1
Country Liberal (NT)	41,923	0.35	+0.00	1	0	1	Steady
Coalition total	5,390,084	45.09	+3.26	21	18	39	▲4
Labor	4,186,715	35.02	+0.70	16	12	28	Steady
Greens	916,431	7.67	+2.73	2	2	4	▲2
Democrats	250,373	2.09	-5.16	0	4	4	▼4
Family First	210,567	1.76	+1.76	1	0	1	▲1
One Nation	206,455	1.73	-3.81	0	0	0	▼1
Christian Democrats	140,674	1.18	+0.06				
Liberals for Forests	107,130	0.90	+0.15				
Democratic Labour	58,042	0.49	−0.08				
Fishing Party	50,356	0.42	+0.18				
HEMP	41,501	0.35	−0.20				
Ex-Service, Service and Veterans Party	25,277	0.21	+0.21				
Citizens Electoral Council	24,663	0.21	+0.14				
Lower Excise Fuel and Beer Party	19,156	0.16	−0.04				
Progressive Alliance	18,856	0.16	+0.16				
Progressive Labour	18,424	0.15	−0.50				
Aged and Disability Pensioners	17,401	0.15	+0.15				
Outdoor Recreation	13,822	0.12	+0.12				
Socialist Alliance	13,305	0.11	+0.11				
Non-Custodial Parents	12,207	0.10	+0.06				
AAFI	11,508	0.10	−0.08				
New Country	11,040	0.09	+0.09				
No GST	9,713	0.08	−0.35				
Great Australians	6,984	0.06	+0.06				
Republican	4,168	0.03	−0.06				
Save the ADI Site	3,281	0.03	+0.03				
Hope Party Australia	2,938	0.02	−0.01				
Nuclear Disarmament	2,163	0.02	−0.02				
Unendorsed/ungrouped	180,385	1.51	+1.13	0	0	0	▼2 (Note: Both independent senators were from Tasmania. Brian Harradine did not contest the election while Labor turned independent Shayne Murphy was not re-elected.)
Total	11,953,649	100.00	–	40	36	76	
Invalid/blank votes	466,370	3.75	−0.14	–	–	–	–
Registered voters/turnout	12,420,019	94.82	-0.38	–	–	–	–
Source: Upper house results: AEC

== New South Wales ==
Elected	#	Senator	Party
2004	1	Bill Heffernan	Liberal
2004	2	Steve Hutchins	Labor
2004	3	Concertta Fierravanti-Wells	Liberal
2004	4	John Faulkner	Labor
2004	5	Fiona Nash	National
2004	6	Michael Forshaw	Labor
2001
2001	1	Helen Coonan	Liberal
2001	2	Ursula Stephens	Labor
2001	3	Sandy Macdonald	National
2001	4	George Campbell	Labor
2001	5	Marise Payne	Liberal
2001	6	Kerry Nettle	Greens

2004 Australian federal election: Senate, New South Wales
Party	Candidate	Votes	%	±%
Quota		567,796		
Liberal/National Coalition	1. Bill Heffernan (Lib) (elected 1); 2. Concetta Fierravanti-Wells (Lib) (elected 3); 3. Fiona Nash (Nat) (elected 5); 4. John Tierney (Lib); 5. Michael Darby (Lib); 6. Robyn Bain (Nat)	1,753,507	44.12	+2.36
Labor	1. Steve Hutchins (elected 2); 2. John Faulkner (elected 4); 3. Michael Forshaw (elected 6); 4. Joanna Woods	1,445,602	36.37	+2.87
Greens	1. John Kaye; 2. Carol Berry; 3. Ben Oquist; 4. Susie Russell; 5. Trish Mullins; 6. Jeremy Buckingham	291,845	7.34	+2.98
Christian Democrats	1. Fred Nile; 2. Patricia Giles; 3. Peter Walker; 4. Kevin Hume; 5. George Capsis	103,831	2.61	+0.74
Democrats	1. Aden Ridgeway; 2. Nina Burridge; 3. Greg Butler	87,377	2.20	−4.01
One Nation	1. Judith Newson; 2. Lynn Stanfield; 3. Peter Bussa	75,284	1.89	−3.69
HEMP	1. Michael Balderstone; 2. Graham Askey	24,016	0.60	−0.32
Family First	1. Joan Woods; 2. Ivan Herald	22,210	0.56	+0.56
Fishing Party	1. Bob Smith; 2. David Hitchcock	21,322	0.54	−0.17
Liberals for Forests	1. Glenn Druery; 2. Ruth Green	21,197	0.53	+0.53
Lower Excise Fuel	1. Dave O'Loughlin; 2. Derek Ridgley	19,156	0.48	−0.13
Outdoor Recreation	1. Leon Belgrave; 2. Janos Beregszaszi	13,822	0.35	+0.35
Group A	1. David Ettridge; 2. Ashley Ettridge	13,635	0.34	+0.34
Progressive Labour	1. Klaas Woldring; 2. Kate Ferguson	13,175	0.33	−1.44
Veterans	1. Bruce Howlett; 2. Bonnie Fraser; 3. Trevor Hesse	12,905	0.32	+0.32
AAFI	1. David Kitson; 2. Edwin Woodger	11,508	0.29	−0.25
No GST	1. Mick Gallagher; 2. Warwick Mead	9,713	0.24	−0.42
New Country	1. Greg Graham; 2. Lisa de Meur	6,218	0.16	+0.16
Great Australians	1. Brett McHolme; 2. Dennis Robinson	4,691	0.12	+0.12
Socialist Alliance	1. Kylie Moon; 2. Ray Jackson	4,241	0.11	+0.11
Save the ADI Site	1. Geoff Brown; 2. Bernie Laughlan	3,281	0.08	+0.08
Non-Custodial Parents	1. Grahame Marks; 2. Andrew Thompson	2,930	0.07	−0.03
Group K	1. Martin Zitek; 2. Robert Zitek	2,750	0.07	+0.07
Citizens Electoral Council	1. Robert Butler; 2. Richard Witten	2,471	0.06	+0.00
Progressive Alliance	1. Reese Malcolm; 2. Lee Raper	2,342	0.06	+0.06
Nuclear Disarmament	1. Michael Denborough; 2. Yvonne Francis	2,163	0.05	−0.07
Group D	1. James Harker-Mortlock; 2. Kelly Ferguson	1,637	0.04	+0.04
Independent	John Thompson	549	0.01	+0.01
Group W	1. Tom Vogelgesang; 2. Don Nguyen	538	0.01	+0.01
Independent	Paul Simpson	251	0.01	+0.01
Independent	Carole Carpenter	208	0.01	+0.01
Group U	1. Nick Beams; 2. Terry Cook	116	0.00	+0.00
Independent	Jack Lord	74	0.00	+0.01
Total formal votes		3,974,565	96.53	+0.07
Informal votes		143,021	3.47	−0.07
Turnout		4,117,586	95.11	−0.38

The primary vote saw the Coalition winning three seats and Labor winning two, leaving the Greens and Labor leading the Christian Democrats for the final seat. Preferences from liberals for forests, Family First, the Democrats and One Nation meant that the Christian Democrats ended up overtaking both Labor and the Greens for the final vacancy, but Labor managed to stay ahead of the Greens, meaning that Labor ending up taking the final seat using Green preferences. The result was three seats coalition and three seats Labor.

== Victoria ==
Elected	#	Senator	Party
2004	1	Michael Ronaldson	Liberal
2004	2	Kim Carr	Labor
2004	3	Julian McGauran	National
2004	4	Stephen Conroy	Labor
2004	5	Judith Troeth	Liberal
2004	6	Steve Fielding	Family First
2001
2001	1	Mitch Fifield	Liberal
2001	2	Robert Ray	Labor
2001	3	Rod Kemp	Liberal
2001	4	Gavin Marshall	Labor
2001	5	Kay Patterson	Liberal
2001	6	Lyn Allison	Democrats

2004 Australian federal election: Senate, Victoria
Party	Candidate	Votes	%	±%
Quota		428,085		
Liberal/National Coalition	1. Michael Ronaldson (Lib) (elected 1); 2. Julian McGauran (Nat) (elected 3); 3. Judith Troeth (Lib) (elected 5); 4. Dino De Marchi (Lib); 5. Jim Forbes (Lib); 6. Eugene Notermans (Lib)	1,321,445	44.10	+4.49
Labor	1. Kim Carr (elected 2); 2. Stephen Conroy (elected 4); 3. Jacinta Collins; 4. Marg Lewis	1,082,271	36.12	−0.67
Greens	1. David Risstrom; 2. Richard Di Natale; 3. Pamela Curr; 4. Liz Conor; 5. Sue Pennicuik; 6. Berhan Ahmed	263,551	8.80	+2.81
Democratic Labor	1. John Mulholland; 2. Pat Crea; 3. Gail King; 4. Rosemary Maurus; 5. Ken Wells	58,042	1.94	−0.34
Family First	1. Steve Fielding (elected 6); 2. Danny Nalliah; 3. Annette Blaze; 4. Allan Meyer; 5. Ann Bown	56,376	1.88	+1.88
Democrats	1. Jess Healy; 2. Greg Chipp; 3. Tony Inglese; 4. Jo McCubbin	55,867	1.86	−5.96
Liberals for Forests	1. Steve Clancy; 2. Rad Wintle	55,170	1.84	−0.56
One Nation	1. Tim Foster; 2. James Neary	21,532	0.72	−1.73
Pensioners	1. Graeme Cleaves; 2. Ian Kleeman	17,401	0.58	+0.58
Citizens Electoral Council	1. Craig Isherwood; 2. Kelly-Ann Paull	16,227	0.54	+0.45
Christian Democrats	1. Alan Barron; 2. Phil Seymour	10,239	0.34	−0.25
Veterans	1. Roger Tozer; 2. Pam Brown	8,601	0.29	+0.29
Group S	1. Richard Frankland; 2. Peter Phelps; 3. John Harding	7,266	0.24	+0.24
Socialist Alliance	1. Lalitha Chelliah; 2. Sue Bolton	4,906	0.16	+0.16
Republican	1. Peter Consandine; 2. Sheila Newman	4,168	0.14	+0.14
Independent	1. Joseph Toscano; 2. Steven Reghenzani	3,418	0.11	+0.11
Non-Custodial Parents	1. Kevin Boers; 2. Brendan Hall	3,310	0.11	+0.11
Hope	1. Tim Petherbridge; 2. Lee-Anne Poynton	2,938	0.10	+0.01
Progressive Alliance	1. Chris Grigsby; 2. Charles Williams	2,453	0.08	+0.08
Independent	Phillip Mason	478	0.02	+0.02
Independent	Che Endra Che-Kahn	212	0.01	+0.01
Independent	Harald Dreger	192	0.01	+0.01
Independent	Judi-ann Leggetts	168	0.01	+0.01
Independent	Barry Walters	161	0.01	+0.01
Independent	David Buck	80	0.00	+0.00
Independent	Glenn Floyd	71	0.00	+0.00
Independent	John Tibble	51	0.00	+0.00
Total formal votes		2,996,594	94.87	+0.47
Informal votes		162,047	5.13	−0.47
Turnout		3,158,641	95.43	−0.61

Primary votes ensured that the Coalition secured three senate seats and Labor secured two. This left the Greens leading with Labor not far behind as preferences began counting. In an attempt to protect their third candidate, Jacinta Collins, Labor made a deal with several groups including the Democratic Labor Party, Family First Party and the Christian Democrats where they would preference her ahead of the Coalition in exchange for Labor preferences, expecting them to be eliminated before these preferences could be distributed. However, it backfired badly as the Family First Party, despite starting with less than two percent of the primary vote, received many preferences from the Christian Democrats, the Aged and Disability Pensioners Party, One Nation, the Coalition, liberals for forests, the Australian Democrats and the Democratic Labor Party that easily put Family First ahead of Labor. And, as per the Jacinta Collins deal, the majority of the Labor preferences went to Family First too, meaning that Steve Fielding was comfortably elected ahead of Greens candidate David Risstrom. The result was three seats Coalition, two seats Labor and one seat Family First.

== Queensland ==
Elected	#	Senator	Party
2004	1	Brett Mason	Liberal
2004	2	Jan McLucas	Labor
2004	3	George Brandis	Liberal
2004	4	Joe Ludwig	Labor
2004	5	Barnaby Joyce	National
2004	3	Russell Trood	Liberal
2001
2001	1	Ian Macdonald	Liberal
2001	2	John Hogg	Labor
2001	3	Santo Santoro	Liberal
2001	4	Claire Moore	Labor
2001	5	Andrew Bartlett	Democrats
2001	6	Ron Boswell	National

2004 Australian federal election: Senate, Queensland
Party	Candidate	Votes	%	±%
Quota		323,611		
Liberal	1. Brett Mason (elected 1); 2. George Brandis (elected 3); 3. Russell Trood (elected 6); 4. Sue Boyce	867,276	38.29	+3.39
Labor	1. Jan McLucas (elected 2); 2. Joe Ludwig (elected 4); 3. Frank Gilbert	717,005	36.12	−0.08
National	1. Barnaby Joyce (elected 5); 2. James Baker; 3. Stewart Gillies	149,719	6.61	−2.55
Greens	1. Drew Hutton; 2. Sarah Moles; 3. Theresa Millard	122,393	5.40	+2.09
Group K	1. Pauline Hanson; 2. Judy Smith	102,824	4.54	+4.54
Family First	1. John Lewis; 2. Tracy Skellern-Smith	76,309	3.37	+3.37
One Nation	1. Len Harris; 2. Ian Nelson; 3. James Savage	71,043	3.14	−6.88
Democrats	1. John Cherry; 2. Bonny Bauer	49,898	2.20	−4.49
Fishing Party	1. Kevin Collins; 2. Darryl Whitford	29,034	1.28	+1.28
Liberals for Forests	1. Joseph Clark; 2. Archie Chapman	22,283	0.98	+0.98
HEMP	1. Guy Freemarijuana; 2. Tony Kneipp	17,485	0.77	−0.54
Group O	1. Hetty Johnston; 2. Diana Scott	15,596	0.69	+0.69
Group A	1. Terry Rushton; 2. Eamon Coll	5,152	0.23	+0.23
Non-Custodial Parents	1. Geoff Webster; 2. Doug Thompson	4,226	0.19	+0.19
Citizens Electoral Council	1. Maurice Hetherington; 2. Ray Gillham	3,359	0.15	+0.05
New Country	1. Lorraine Wheeldon; 2. Rowell Walton	2,841	0.13	+0.13
Socialist Alliance	1. Sam Watson; 2. Nicole Clevens	2,334	0.10	+0.10
Great Australians	1. John Rivett; 2. Mal McKenzie	2,293	0.10	+0.10
Group D	1. Selwyn Johnston; 2. Susan Harvey	1,408	0.06	+0.06
Group G	1. Gail Duncan; 2. Kim McIntosh	1,015	0.04	+0.04
Progressive Alliance	1. Tony Newman; 2. Darrell Morris	921	0.04	+0.04
Independent	Darryl McArthur	568	0.03	+0.03
Independent	Hassan Ghulam	295	0.01	+0.01
Total formal votes		2,265,274	97.21	+0.16
Informal votes		65,037	2.79	−0.16
Turnout		2,330,311	94.13	−1.10

Primary votes saw two Labor and two Liberal senators get elected, leaving the Liberal Party well ahead of the National Party, the Greens and former One Nation leader Pauline Hanson, who this election ran as an independent. Pauline Hanson attracted a lot of preferential votes, which meant that her former party was surprisingly excluded before she was. This meant that her preferences could not go to One Nation and threaten the Liberal and National parties. As such, the National Party, using Fishing Party preferences, won the fifth seat and the Liberals won the sixth seat. The result was three seats Liberal, two seats Labor and one seat National.

== Western Australia ==
Elected	#	Senator	Party
2004	1	Chris Ellison	Liberal
2004	2	Chris Evans	Labor
2004	3	Ian Campbell	Liberal
2004	4	Glenn Sterle	Labor
2004	5	Judith Adams	Liberal
2004	6	Rachel Siewert	Greens
2001
2001	1	Alan Eggleston	Liberal
2001	2	Mark Bishop	Labor
2001	3	David Johnston	Liberal
2001	4	Ruth Webber	Labor
2001	5	Ross Lightfoot	Liberal
2001	6	Andrew Murray	Democrats

2004 Australian federal election: Senate, Western Australia
Party	Candidate	Votes	%	±%
Quota		161,166		
Liberal	1. Chris Ellison (elected 1); 2. Ian Campbell (elected 3); 3. Judith Adams (elected 5); 4. Michelle Steck	556,558	49.34	+9.21
Labor	1. Chris Evans (elected 2); 2. Glenn Sterle (elected 4); 3. Emiliano Barzotto	366,825	32.52	−1.63
Greens	1. Rachel Siewert (elected 6); 2. Colin Hughes; 3. Christopher Newall; 4. Felicity Peterson	90,956	8.06	+2.21
One Nation	1. James Hopkinson; 2. Ron McLean	27,601	2.45	−4.58
Democrats	1. Brian Greig; 2. Dominika Lisowski; 3. Jason Meotti	22,603	2.00	−3.86
Christian Democrats	1. Lachlan Dunjey; 2. Peter Watt; 3. Norman Gage	21,234	1.88	+0.63
National	1. Geoff Gill; 2. Norm Henning	9,699	0.86	−1.49
Family First	1. Nigel Irvine; 2. Don Hatch	9,553	0.85	+0.85
Liberals for Forests	1. Lesley McKay; 2. Vicki Taylor	5,680	0.50	−0.92
Progressive Labour	1. Mary Lupi; 2. Lyn Kearsley	5,249	0.47	−0.22
Group A	1. Alicia Curtis; 2. Steven Ogle	4,122	0.37	+0.37
Citizens Electoral Council	1. Jean Robertson; 2. Stuart Smith	2,098	0.19	+0.08
New Country	1. Mal Harrington; 2. Brendan Mansell	1,981	0.18	+0.18
Non-Custodial Parents	1. Brian Taylor; 2. Geoff Dixon	1,741	0.15	+0.15
Progressive Alliance	1. Geoff Gibson; 2. Stephen Crabbe	932	0.08	+0.08
Independent	Julie Easton	1,015	0.09	+0.09
Independent	Jim Jardine	146	0.01	+0.01
Independent	Alexander Marsden	132	0.01	+0.01
Total formal votes		1,128,155	96.46	+0.35
Informal votes		41,452	3.54	−0.04
Turnout		1,169,607	93.66	−1.38

Primary votes saw three Liberal and two Labor senators get elected, leaving the Greens with a sizeable lead against the Liberals. Preferences from the Democrats and Labor saw that lead extended even further, and Greens candidate Rachel Siewert comfortably took the final vacancy. The result was three seats Liberal, two seats Labor and one seat Greens.

== South Australia ==
Elected	#	Senator	Party
2004	1	Nick Minchin	Liberal
2004	2	Anne McEwen	Labor
2004	3	Amanda Vanstone	Liberal
2004	4	Annette Hurley	Labor
2004	5	Alan Ferguson	Liberal
2004	6	Dana Wortley	Labor
2001
2001	1	Robert Hill	Liberal
2001	2	Penny Wong	Labor
2001	3	Jeannie Ferris	Liberal
2001	4	Linda Kirk	Labor
2001	5	Grant Chapman	Liberal
2001	6	Natasha Stott Despoja	Democrats

2004 Australian federal election: Senate, South Australia
Party	Candidate	Votes	%	±%
Quota		138,249		
Liberal	1. Nick Minchin (elected 1); 2. Amanda Vanstone (elected 3); 3. Alan Ferguson (elected 5); 4. Sue Lawrie	459,560	47.49	+1.94
Labor	1. Anne McEwen (elected 2); 2. Annette Hurley (elected 4); 3. Dana Wortley (elected 6)	343,422	35.49	+2.25
Greens	1. Brian Noone; 2. Clare McCarty; 3. Mij Tanith; 4. Sandy Montgomery	63,881	6.60	+3.15
Family First	1. Andrea Mason; 2. Tony Bates; 3. Toni Turnbull	38,559	3.98	+3.98
Democrats	1. John McLaren; 2. Ruth Russell; 3. Tammy Franks; 4. Jenny Scott	23,118	2.39	−10.23
Progressive Alliance	1. Meg Lees; 2. Kirk Jones; 3. Jenny Macintosh	11,061	1.14	+1.14
One Nation	1. Andrew Phillips; 2. Basil Hille	10,995	1.14	−3.42
National	1. John Venus; 2. Julie Sippo; 3. Ian Willcourt	3,843	0.40	+0.40
Veterans	1. Nicholas McShane; 2. Jarrad Kay	3,771	0.39	+0.39
Liberals for Forests	1. Rita Hunt; 2. Rachael Barons	2,800	0.29	+0.29
Group A	1. Rolf Klotz; 2. Mark Smith; 3. Robyn Munro; 4. Ivan May	1,957	0.20	+0.20
Socialist Alliance	1. Tom Burtuleit; 2. Amy McDonald	1,255	0.13	+0.13
Group M	1. Ben Yengi; 2. Alan Hutton	890	0.09	+0.09
Group P	1. Ralph Hahnheuser; 2. Benno Lang	889	0.09	+0.09
Group C	1. Andrew Stanko; 2. Damian Woodards	657	0.07	+0.07
Independent	Richard Armour	437	0.05	+0.05
Group B	1. Kane Winther; 2. Claire Winther	402	0.04	+0.04
Independent	John Lawrie	126	0.01	+0.01
Independent	Richard Lutz	115	0.01	+0.01
Total formal votes		967,738	96.47	−0.47
Informal votes		35,424	3.53	+0.47
Turnout		1,003,162	95.36	−0.86

Primary votes saw three Liberal seats and two Labor seats secured. With South Australia being the former constituent of former Democrats leader now Progressive Alliance leader Meg Lees, the state saw the largest swing against the Democrats and the largest total for the Progressive Alliance. ABC Election Analyst Antony Green suggested that had the Democrats done better in the primary vote in South Australia, they may have won the final senate seat on Family First preferences. Instead, the Democrat preferences saw Family First go ahead of the Greens, leading to Labor winning the seat on Green preferences. The result was three seats Liberal and three seats Labor.

== Tasmania ==
Elected	#	Senator	Party
2004	1	Eric Abetz	Liberal
2004	2	Kerry O'Brien	Labor
2004	3	Guy Barnett	Liberal
2004	4	Helen Polley	Labor
2004	5	Stephen Parry	Liberal
2004	6	Christine Milne	Greens
2001
2001	1	Paul Calvert	Liberal
2001	2	Sue Mackay	Labor
2004	3	John Watson	Liberal
2001	4	Nick Sherry	Labor
2001	5	Bob Brown	Greens
2001	6	Richard Colbeck	Liberal

2004 Australian federal election: Senate, Tasmania
Party	Candidate	Votes	%	±%
Quota		45,382		
Liberal	1. Eric Abetz (elected 1); 2. Guy Barnett (elected 3); 3. Stephen Parry (elected 5)	146,532	46.13	+7.34
Labor	1. Kerry O'Brien (elected 2); 2. Helen Polley (elected 4); 3. David Price; 4. Nicole Wells	106,531	33.54	−3.30
Greens	1. Christine Milne (elected 6); 2. Karen Cassidy; 3. Tom Millen	42,214	13.29	−0.50
Family First	1. Jacquie Petrusma; 2. Lance Bergman; 3. Lindsay Smith	7,563	2.38	+2.38
Group F	1. Shayne Murphy	6,888	2.17	+2.17
Democrats	1. Yulia Onsman; 2. Suzanne Cass	2,614	0.82	−3.80
Christian Democrats	1. David Mitchell; 2. Michael Fracalossi	2,076	0.65	+0.65
Independent	Dino Ottavi	1,283	0.40	+0.40
Group G (Harradine candidates)	1. Steve Martin; 2. John Newman	1,139	0.36	+0.36
Citizens Electoral Council	1. Rob Larner; 2. Adrian Watts	508	0.16	+0.16
Independent	Rob Newitt	188	0.06	+0.06
Independent	John McDonald	99	0.03	+0.03
Independent	Ellen Gargan	32	0.01	+0.01
Total formal votes		317,667	96.63	−0.08
Informal votes		11,091	3.37	+0.08
Turnout		328,758	95.90	−0.93

Primary votes saw the Liberal Party winning three senate seats and Labor winning two, leaving the Greens leading for the sixth seat against the Family First Party with a sizable majority. However, Tasmania was one of two states where Labor preferenced the Family First Party ahead of the Greens, meaning that the Family First candidate Jacquie Petrusma was expected to receive large amounts of preferences and win the final seat. However, Greens candidate Christine Milne ended up winning the seat, mainly due to the high amount of "below the line" voting in Tasmania. The result was three seats Liberal, two seats Labor and one seat Green.

== Territories ==
=== Australian Capital Territory ===
Elected	#	Senator	Party
2004	1	Kate Lundy	Labor
2004	2	Gary Humphries	Liberal

2004 Australian federal election: Senate, Australian Capital Territory
Party	Candidate	Votes	%	±%
Quota		70,436		
Labor	1. Kate Lundy (elected 1); 2. David Smith	86,855	41.10	−0.92
Liberal	1. Gary Humphries (elected 2); 2. Ian Morison	80,022	37.87	+3.57
Greens	1. Kerrie Tucker; 2. Roland Manderson	34,575	16.36	+9.14
Democrats	1. Rachael Jacobs; 2. Peter Bourne	4,528	2.14	−8.60
Christian Democrats	1. Tim Janes; 2. John Miller	3,294	1.56	−0.19
Progressive Alliance	1. Jeannette Jolley; 2. Ryan Deebank	1,147	0.54	+0.54
Independent	Dave Edwards	885	0.42	+0.42
Total formal votes		211,306	97.54	−0.12
Informal votes		5,325	2.46	+0.12
Turnout		216,631	95.16	−0.53

=== Northern Territory ===
Elected	#	Senator	Party
2004	1	Nigel Scullion	CLP
2004	2	Trish Crossin	Labor

2004 Australian federal election: Senate, Northern Territory
Party	Candidate	Votes	%	±%
Quota		30,785		
Country Liberal	1. Nigel Scullion (elected 1); 2. Bernadette Greg	41,923	45.40	+1.69
Labor	1. Trish Crossin (elected 2); 2. Wayne Connop	38,204	41.37	+2.15
Greens	1. Mark Wakeham; 2. Shan McKenzie	7,016	7.60	+3.33
Democrats	1. Janeen Bulsey; 2. Fay Lawrence	4,368	4.73	−2.57
Socialist Alliance	1. Ray Hayes; 2. Kathy Newnam	569	0.62	+0.62
Independent	Wayne Wright	270	0.29	+0.29
Total formal votes		92,350	96.88	−0.36
Informal votes		2,973	3.12	+0.36
Turnout		95,323	84.73	−1.47

== See also ==
- Candidates of the 2004 Australian federal election
- Members of the Australian Senate, 2005–2008
