= 2001 Australian Senate election =

Australian federal election results

2001 Australian Senate elections
- 10 November 2001

40 of the 76 seats in the Australian Senate 39 seats needed for a majority
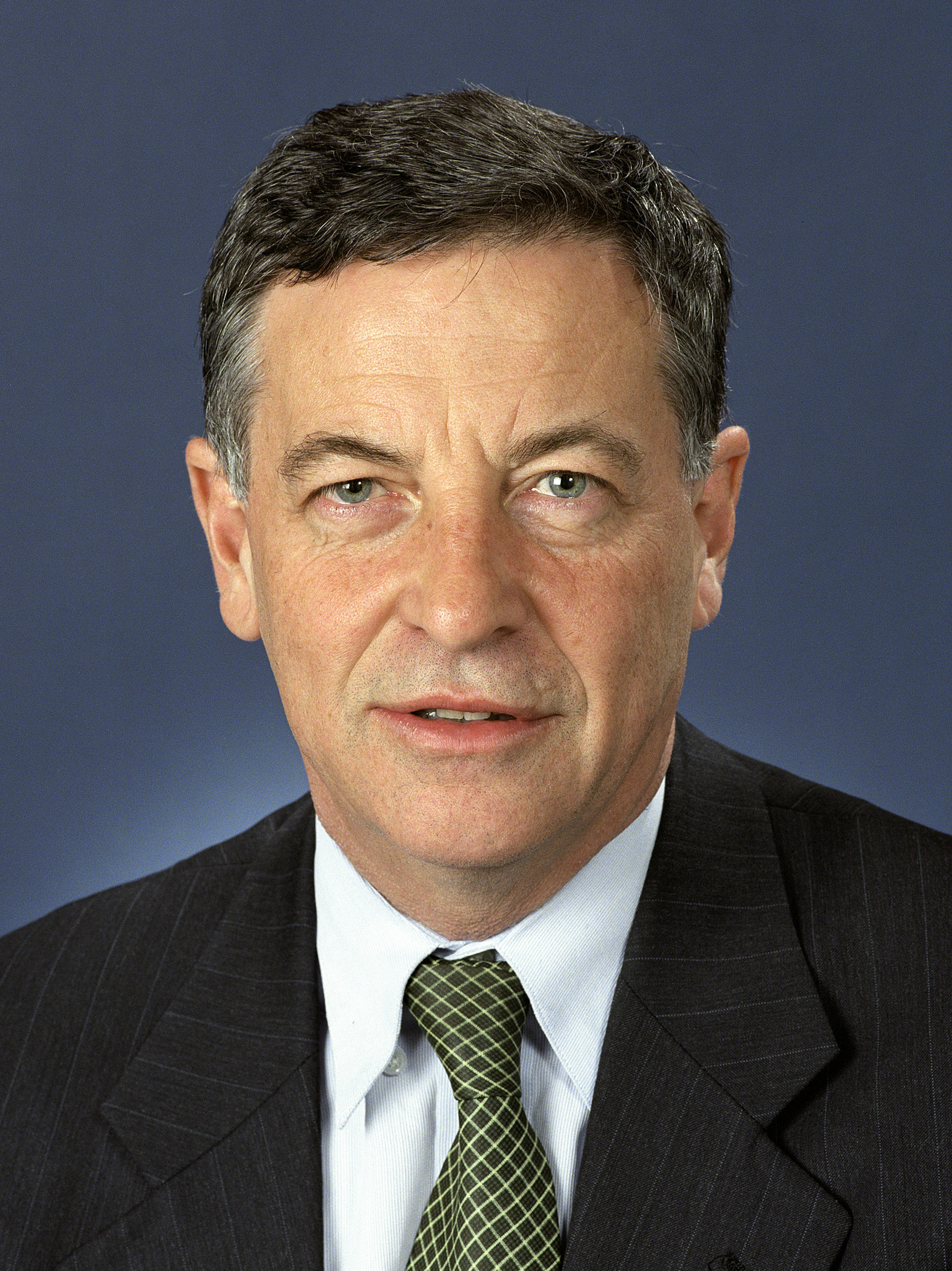

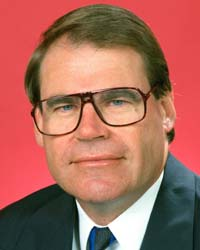

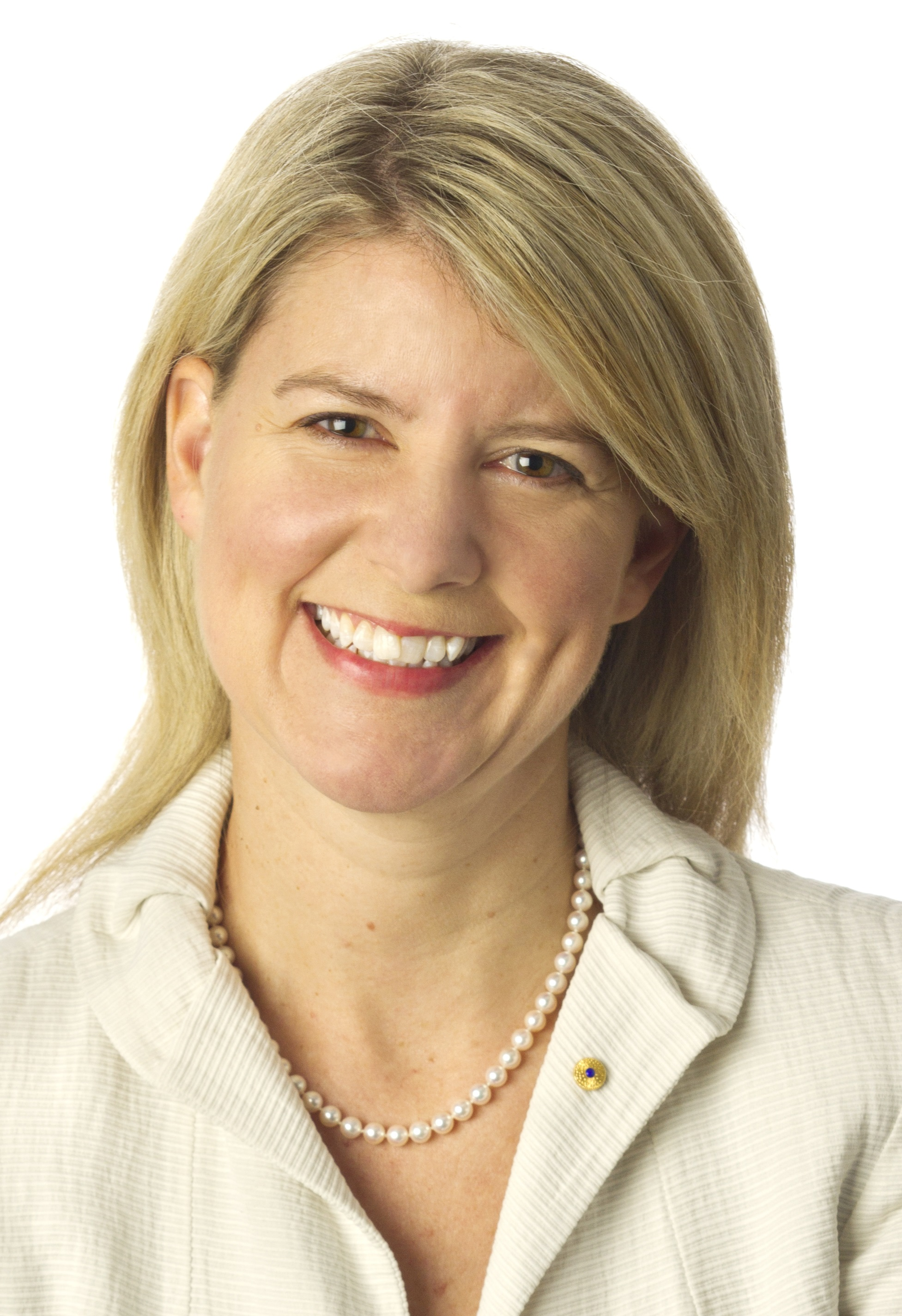

	First party	Second party
Leader	Robert Hill	John Faulkner
Party	Liberal–National Coalition	Labor
Leader since	3 April 1990	19 March 1996
Leader's seat	South Australia	New South Wales
Seats before	35	28
Seats after	35	28
Seat change	Steady	Steady
Popular vote	4,641,477	3,990,997
Percentage	39.92%	34.42%
Swing	▲4.10%	▼2.99%
	Third party	Fourth party
Leader	Natasha Stott Despoja	None
Party	Democrats	Greens
Leader since	6 April 2001
Leader's seat	South Australia	None
Seats before	9	1
Seats won	4	2
Seats after	8	2
Seat change	▼1	▲1
Popular vote	843,130	574,543
Percentage	7.25%	4.94%
Swing	▼1.20%	▲2.22%
- Senators elected in the 2001 federal election
Leader of the Senate before election
Robert Hill
Liberal/National coalition
Elected Leader of the Senate
Robert Hill
Liberal/National coalition

The following tables show state-by-state results in the Australian Senate at the 2001 federal election. Senators total 35 coalition (31 Liberal, three National, one CLP), 28 Labor, two Green, eight Democrats, two Independents (Note: Shayne Murphy had resigned from the Labor Party on 2 October 2001 and served out the rest of his term as an independent.) and one One Nation. Senator terms are six years (three for territories), and took their seats from 1 July 2002, except the territories who took their seats immediately.

== Australia ==
Senate (STV GV) — Turnout 95.20% (CV) — Informal 3.89%
Party	Votes	%	Swing	Seats won	Total seats	Change
Liberal/National Coalition						
Liberal/National joint ticket	2,776,052	23.87	+2.00	6	11	Steady
Liberal	1,824,745	15.69	+2.06	12	22	Steady
National	222,860	1.92	+0.06	1	1	Steady
Country Liberal	40,680	0.35	+0.03	1	1	Steady
Coalition total	4,863,337	41.83	+4.15	20	35	Steady
Labor	3,990,997	34.32	-2.99	14	28	Steady
Democrats	843,130	7.25	-1.20	4	8	▼1
One Nation	644,364	5.54	-3.44	0	1	Steady
Greens	574,543	4.94	+2.22	2	2	▲1
Christian Democrats	129,966	1.12	+0.03			
Liberals for Forests	87,672	0.75	*			
Progressive Labour	76,150	0.65	*			
Democratic Labor	66,547	0.57	+0.30			
HEMP	63,648	0.55	*			
No GST	50,053	0.43	+0.29			
Unity	30,193	0.26	-0.57			
Fishing Party	27,591	0.24	*			
Lower Excise Fuel and Beer Party	23,767	0.20	*			
AAFI	21,012	0.18	+0.11			
Republican	9,939	0.09	+0.08			
Citizens Electoral Council	8,896	0.08	+0.00			
Legal System Reform	8,199	0.07	*			
Our Common Future	5,358	0.05	*			
Nuclear Disarmament	4,596	0.04	-0.05			
Non-Custodial Parents	4,071	0.04	+0.04			
Tasmania First	3,895	0.03	-0.01			
Curtin Labor Alliance	3,494	0.03	*			
Hope	2,947	0.03	*			
Advance Australia	1,936	0.02	*			
Taxi Operators' Political Service	670	0.01	*			
Other	79,834	0.69	+0.39	0	2	Steady
Total	11,627,529			40	76	
Invalid/blank votes	470,515	3.9				
Turnout	12,098,320	95.7				
Registered voters	12,636,631					
Source: Federal Elections 1998

== New South Wales ==
Elected	#	Senator	Party
2001	1	Helen Coonan	Liberal
2001	2	Ursula Stephens	Labor
2001	3	Sandy Macdonald	National
2001	4	George Campbell	Labor
2001	5	Marise Payne	Liberal
2001	6	Kerry Nettle	Greens
1998
1998	1	Steve Hutchins	Labor
1998	2	Bill Heffernan	Liberal
1998	3	John Faulkner	Labor
1998	4	John Tierney	Liberal
1998	5	Aden Ridgeway	Democrats
1998	6	Michael Forshaw	Labor

2001 Australian federal election: Senate, New South Wales
Party	Candidate	Votes	%	±%
Quota		554,207		
Coalition	1. Helen Coonan (Lib) (elected 1); 2. Sandy Macdonald (Nat) (elected 3); 3. Marise Payne (Lib) (elected 5); 4. Fiona Nash (Nat); 5. Scot MacDonald (Lib); 6. Terence Tang (Lib)	1,620,235	41.76	+3.3
Labor	1. Ursula Stephens (elected 2); 2. George Campbell (elected 4); 3. Warren Mundine; 4. Joanna Woods	1,299,488	33.50	−5.0
Democrats	1. Vicki Bourne; 2. Joanne Yates; 3. Craig Chung; 4. Caroline Mayfield; 5. Janine Prince; 6. Julian Evans	240,867	6.21	−1.1
One Nation	1. Don McKinnon; 2. Rick Putra; 3. Carol Deeney	216,522	5.58	−4.0
Greens	1. Kerry Nettle (elected 6); 2. John Kaye; 3. Jan Davis; 4. James Ryan	169,139	4.36	+2.3
Christian Democrats	1. George Capsis; 2. Kevin Hume	72,697	1.87	+0.4
Progressive Labour	1. Klaas Woldring; 2. Shona Lee	68,483	1.77	+1.8
HEMP	1. Michael Balderstone; 2. Don Fuggle	35,526	0.92	+0.9
Fishing Party	1. Robert Smith; 2. David Wiseman	27,591	0.71	+0.7
No GST	1. Mick Gallagher; 2. Charles Martin	25,734	0.66	+0.5
Lower Excise Fuel	1. David O'Loughlin; 2. Paul Freeman	23,767	0.61	+0.6
AAFI	1. David Kitson; 2. Edwin Woodger	21,012	0.54	+0.3
Unity	1. Thang Ngo; 2. Robert McLeod	19,731	0.51	−1.1
Legal System Reform	1. Denise Greenaway; 2. Valerie Armstrong	8,199	0.21	+0.2
Our Common Future	1. Helen Caldicott; 2. Ted Potts	5,358	0.14	+0.1
Republican	1. Kerry McNally; 2. Tom Jordan	5,101	0.13	+0.1
Nuclear Disarmament	1. Michael Denborough; 2. Yvonne Francis	4,596	0.12	−0.1
Non-Custodial Parents	1. Andy Thompson; 2. Annette McKeegan	4,071	0.10	+0.1
Group L	1. Lex Stewart; 2. John Stewart	2,402	0.06	+0.06
Citizens Electoral Council	1. Robert Butler; 2. Clenys Collins	2,370	0.06	+0.0
Advance Australia	1. Rex Connor; 2. Robert Astridge; 3. Shirley Guy	1,936	0.05	+0.05
Group U	1. Pip Hinman; 2. Ian Rintoul	1,364	0.04	+0.04
Group N	1. Warren Smith; 2. Geoff Lawler; 3. Dora Anthony	1,241	0.03	+0.03
Independent	Beverly Baker	971	0.03	+0.03
Independent	F Ivor	703	0.02	+0.02
Independent	Jack Lord	237	0.01	+0.01
Independent	Walter Tinyow	102	0.01	+0.01
Total formal votes		3,879,443	96.46	−0.23
Informal votes		142,281	3.54	+0.23
Turnout		4,021,724	95.66	−0.68

== Victoria ==
Elected	#	Senator	Party
2001	1	Richard Alston	Liberal
2001	2	Robert Ray	Labor
2001	3	Rod Kemp	Liberal
2001	4	Gavin Marshall	Labor
2001	5	Kay Patterson	Liberal
2001	6	Lyn Allison	Democrats
1998
1998	1	Stephen Conroy	Labor
1998	2	Judith Troeth	Liberal
1998	3	Kim Carr	Labor
1998	4	Julian McGauran	National
1998	5	Jacinta Collins	Labor
1998	6	Tsebin Tchen	Liberal

2001 Australian federal election: Senate, Victoria
Party	Candidate	Votes	%	±%
Quota		416,896		
Coalition	1. Richard Alston (Lib) (elected 1); 2. Rod Kemp (Lib) (elected 3); 3. Kay Patterson (Lib) (elected 5); 4. Tim Hawker (Nat); 5. Dino de Marchi (Lib); 6. Duc-Dung Tran (Lib)	1,155,817	39.61	+1.8
Labor	1. Robert Ray (elected 2); 2. Gavin Marshall (elected 4); 3. Ted Murphy; 4. Robert Chong	1,073,632	36.79	−3.7
Democrats	1. Lyn Allison (elected 6); 2. Pierre Harcourt; 3. David Wark; 4. Simone Alesich	228,212	7.82	−2.0
Greens	1. Scott Kinnear; 2. Eleisha Mullane; 3. Dinesh Mathew; 4. Liz Conor	174,756	4.36	+3.5
One Nation	1. Robyn Spencer; 2. Neville McIntyre	71,598	2.45	−1.6
Liberals for Forests	1. Suresh Pathy; 2. John Lugg	70,134	2.40	+2.4
Democratic Labor	1. John Mulholland; 2. Pat Crea; 3. Gail King; 4. Rosemary Maurus; 5. Ken Wells	66,547	2.28	+0.0
Group C	1. Phil Cleary; 2. Eileen Zombolas	36,142	1.24	+1.24
Christian Democrats	1. Murray Graham; 2. Arnold Jago	17,155	0.59	+0.1
Unity	1. Wellington Lee; 2. Diana Wolowski; 3. Bill Cope (academic)	9,651	0.33	−0.4
Citizens Electoral Council	1. Noelene Isherwood; 2. Robert Barwick	2,660	0.09	+0.1
Group J	1. A.T. Baker; 2. Pam Barber	2,585	0.09	+0.09
Hope	1. Tim Petherbridge; 2. Lee-Anne Poynton	2,581	0.09	+0.1
Group Q	1. Alison Thorne; 2. Sarah Peart; 3. Tony Dewberry	1,730	0.06	+0.06
Group F	1. Steve Raskovy; 2. Elizabeth Kennedy	1,496	0.05	+0.05
Group E	1. Joseph Toscano; 2. Stephen Reghenzani	1,391	0.05	+0.05
Group N	1. Craig Davis; 2. Donna Brocas	700	0.02	+0.02
Independent	Daniel Flood	589	0.02	+0.02
Independent	Isaac Gnieslaw	559	0.02	+0.02
Independent	Richard Maslowski	105	0.01	+0.01
Total formal votes		2,918,267	94.40	−1.82
Informal votes		173,141	5.60	+1.82
Turnout		3,091,408	96.04	−0.55

== Queensland ==
Elected	#	Senator	Party
2001	1	Ian Macdonald	Liberal
2001	2	John Hogg	Labor
2001	3	John Herron	Liberal
2001	4	Claire Moore	Labor
2001	5	Andrew Bartlett	Democrats
2001	6	Ron Boswell	National
1998
1998	1	Jan McLucas	Labor
2000*	2	George Brandis	Liberal
1999†	3	Len Harris	One Nation
1998	4	Joe Ludwig	Labor
1998	5	Brett Mason	Liberal
2001‡	6	John Cherry	Democrats

2001 Australian federal election: Senate, Queensland
Party	Candidate	Votes	%	±%
Quota		307,154		
Liberal	1. Ian Macdonald (elected 1); 2. John Herron (elected 3); 3. Russell Trood; 4. Deborah Kember	750,416	34.90	+9.0
Labor	1. John Hogg (elected 2); 2. Claire Moore (elected 4); 3. Brenda Gibbs	682,239	31.73	−0.9
One Nation	1. Pauline Hanson; 2. Trevor Hansen; 3. Morrie Marsden; 4. John Slack-Smith	215,400	10.02	−4.8
National	1. Ron Boswell (elected 6); 2. Pam Stallman; 3. Barnaby Joyce	196,845	9.16	−0.3
Democrats	1. Andrew Bartlett (elected 5); 2. Liz Oss-Emer; 3. Megan Bathurst	143,942	6.69	−1.0
Greens	1. Sarah Moles; 2. Desiree Mahoney; 3. Mark Taylor	71,102	3.31	+1.2
HEMP	1. Nigel Freemarijuana; 2. Guy Freemarijuana	28,122	1.31	+1.3
No GST	1. David Ettridge; 2. Richard Gooch	24,319	1.13	−1.0
Christian Democrats	1. Kerry Blackman; 2. Geoffrey Bullock	22,703	1.06	−0.3
Group A	1. Sam Watson; 2. Karen Fletcher	8,553	0.40	+0.40
Republican	1. John Pyke; 2. Malcolm Simpson	2,553	0.12	+0.1
Citizens Electoral Council	1. Danny Hope; 2. Nick Contarino	2,226	0.10	+0.10
Independent	Derek Rosborough	700	0.03	+0.03
Independent	Phillip Riley	263	0.01	+0.01
Independent	George Szentes	180	0.01	+0.01
Independent	Oni Kirwin	173	0.01	+0.01
Independent	Anthony Melrose	105	0.01	+0.01
Independent	John Jones	86	0.01	+0.01
Independent	David Howse	78	0.01	+0.01
Independent	Walter Philippi	72	0.01	+0.01
Total formal votes		2,150,077	97.05	+0.09
Informal votes		65,450	2.95	−0.09
Turnout		2,215,527	95.23	+0.33

== Western Australia ==
Elected	#	Senator	Party
2001	1	Alan Eggleston	Liberal
2001	2	Mark Bishop	Labor
2001	3	David Johnston	Liberal
2001	4	Ruth Webber	Labor
2001	5	Ross Lightfoot	Liberal
2001	6	Andrew Murray	Democrats
1998
1998	1	Chris Ellison	Liberal
1998	2	Peter Cook	Labor
1998	3	Ian Campbell	Liberal
1998	4	Chris Evans	Labor
1998	5	Brian Greig	Democrats
1998	6	Sue Knowles	Liberal

2001 Australian federal election: Senate, Western Australia
Party	Candidate	Votes	%	±%
Quota		157,933		
Liberal	1. Alan Eggleston (elected 1); 2. David Johnston (elected 3); 3. Ross Lightfoot (elected 5); 4. Winston Crane; 5. Kim Keogh; 6. Nigel Hallett	443,597	40.13	+1.7
Labor	1. Mark Bishop (elected 2); 2. Ruth Webber (elected 4); 3. Mark Cuomo; 4. Gavin Waugh	377,547	34.15	−0.4
One Nation	1. Graeme Campbell; 2. Gerry Kenworthy; 3. Marye Daniels; 4. Peter David	77,757	7.03	−3.0
Democrats	1. Andrew Murray (elected 6); 2. Helen Hodgson; 3. Damian Meyer	64,773	5.86	−0.5
Greens	1. Rachel Siewert; 2. Lee Bell; 3. Paul Smith; 4. Jenna Zed	64,736	5.86	+0.2
National	1. Hendy Cowan; 2. Margaret Day	26,015	2.35	+1.2
Liberals for Forests	1. Liz Davenport; 2. Arthur Harris	15,646	1.42	+1.4
Christian Democrats	1. Justin Moseley; 2. Kerry Watterson	13,809	1.25	+0.4
Progressive Labour	1. Eddie Hwang; 2. Nicholas Chin	7,667	0.69	+0.7
Group A	1. Jim Dalton; 2. Kate Dalton	4,495	0.41	+0.4
Curtin Labor Alliance	1. Adrian Bennett; 2. June Bennett	3,494	0.32	+0.3
Group B	1. Geoff Taylor; 2. Henry Sheil	1,631	0.15	+0.2
Citizens Electoral Council	1. Jean Robertson; 2. John Watson	1,243	0.11	+0.0
Unity	1. Eddie Hwang; 2. Nicholas Chin	811	0.07	−1.0
Independent	Jennifer Lee	804	0.07	+0.1
Taxi Operators	1. Alan Bateson; 2. Ramon Kennedy	670	0.06	+0.06
Group K	1. Frank Nesci; 2. Renu Schneider	532	0.05	+0.05
Group M	1. Clarrie Isaacs; 2. Daniel Watson	302	0.03	+0.03
Total formal votes		1,105,529	96.42	−0.63
Informal votes		41,025	3.58	+0.63
Turnout		1,146,554	95.04	−0.78

== South Australia ==
Elected	#	Senator	Party
2001	1	Robert Hill	Liberal
2001	2	Penny Wong	Labor
2001	3	Jeannie Ferris	Liberal
2001	4	Linda Kirk	Labor
2001	5	Grant Chapman	Liberal
2001	6	Natasha Stott Despoja	Democrats
1998
1998	1	Amanda Vanstone	Liberal
1998	2	Nick Bolkus	Labor
1998	3	Nick Minchin	Liberal
1998	4	John Quirke	Labor
1998	5	Meg Lees	Democrats
1998	6	Alan Ferguson	Liberal

2001 Australian federal election: Senate, South Australia
Party	Candidate	Votes	%	±%
Quota		138,146		
Liberal	1. Robert Hill (elected 1); 2. Jeannie Ferris (elected 3); 3. Grant Chapman (elected 5); 4. Michelle Lensink	440,537	45.53	+5.0
Labor	1. Penny Wong (elected 2); 2. Linda Kirk (elected 4); 3. Chris Schacht	321,551	33.23	−1.3
Democrats	1. Natasha Stott Despoja (elected 6); 2. Jeff Heath; 3. Michael Pilling; 4. Haroon Hassan	122,195	12.63	+0.3
One Nation	1. Neil Russell-Taylor; 2. Colin Gibson	44,080	4.56	−5.0
Greens	1. Cate Faehrmann; 2. Jim Douglas	33,439	3.46	+1.3
Republican	1. Patrick Crozier; 2. Robert Easson	1,917	0.20	+0.20
Group D	1. Kathy Newnam; 2. Lisa Lines	1,171	0.12	+0.12
Group G	1. Kerry Harte; 2. Colin Phillips	886	0.09	+0.09
Group F	1. Mark Aldridge; 2. Helen Aldridge	750	0.08	+0.08
Independent	Kym Fishlock	596	0.06	+0.06
Independent	Nicholas McShane	309	0.03	+0.03
Citizens Electoral Council	Ervyn Behn	106	0.01	+0.00
Total formal votes		967,015	96.94	−0.25
Informal votes		30,561	3.06	+0.25
Turnout		997,576	96.22	−0.58

== Tasmania ==
Elected	#	Senator	Party
2001	1	Paul Calvert	Liberal
2001	2	Sue Mackay	Labor
2001	3	John Watson	Liberal
2001	4	Nick Sherry	Labor
2001	5	Bob Brown	Greens
2001	6	Richard Colbeck	Liberal
1998
1998	1	Kerry O'Brien	Labor
1998	2	Eric Abetz	Liberal
1998	3	Shayne Murphy	Independent
1998	4	Brian Gibson	Liberal
1998	5	Kay Denman	Labor
1998	6	Brian Harradine	Independent

2001 Australian federal election: Senate, Tasmania
Party	Candidate	Votes	%	±%
Quota		44,095		
Liberal	1. Paul Calvert (elected 1); 2. John Watson (elected 3); 3. Richard Colbeck (elected 6)	119,720	38.79	+6.1
Labor	1. Sue Mackay (elected 2); 2. Nick Sherry (elected 4); 3. Catryna Bilyk	113,709	36.84	−4.6
Greens	Bob Brown (elected 5)	42,568	13.79	+8.0
Democrats	1. Debbie Butler; 2. Brendan Toohey	14,273	4.62	+0.7
One Nation	1. Bronwyn Boag; 2. Peter Stokes	10,169	3.29	−0.4
Tasmania First	1. Merilyn Crack; 2. David Jackson; 3. John Presser	3,895	1.26	−0.2
Liberals for Forests	1. Peter Pullinger; 2. Michael Thomas	1,892	0.61	+0.6
Independent	Eric Lockett	464	0.15	+0.1
Group D	1. Stephen Bonner; 2. Geoff Howard	414	0.13	+0.1
Group G	1. Alex Bainbridge; 2. Sarah Cleary	389	0.13	+0.1
Republican	1. Peter Consandine; 2. Bert Lawatsch	368	0.12	+0.0
Hope	1. James Bristow; 2. Shamara Petherbridge-de Tissera	368	0.12	+0.12
Independent	Helen Lane	268	0.09	+0.09
Independent	John Marmarinos	85	0.03	+0.03
Citizens Electoral Council	Rob Larner	82	0.03	+0.03
Total formal votes		308,662	96.71	−0.23
Informal votes		10,493	3.29	+0.23
Turnout		319,155	96.83	+0.37

== Territories ==
=== Australian Capital Territory ===
Elected	#	Senator	Party
2001	1	Kate Lundy	Labor
2001	2	Margaret Reid	Liberal

2001 Australian federal election: Senate, Australian Capital Territory
Party	Candidate	Votes	%	±%
Quota		68,492		
Labor	1. Kate Lundy (elected 1); 2. Robin Poke	86,331	42.02	−1.0
Liberal	1. Margaret Reid (elected 2); 2. Bill Hanlon	70,475	34.30	+3.0
Democrats	1. Wayne Sievers; 2. Roslyn Dundas	22,072	10.74	−6.2
Greens	1. Gary Corr; 2. Felicity Fahey	14,825	7.22	+4.0
One Nation	1. Don Tarlinton; 2. Ted Tarlinton	4,485	2.18	−2.2
Christian Democrats	1. Ian McClure; 2. Tim Janes	3,602	1.25	+0.8
Independent	Ken Helm	3,580	1.74	+1.74
Citizens Electoral Council	James Arnold	104	0.05	+0.05
Total formal votes		205,474	97.66	−0.37
Informal votes		4,924	2.34	+0.37
Turnout		210,398	95.69	−0.62

=== Northern Territory ===
Elected	#	Senator	Party
2001	1	Nigel Scullion	CLP
2001	2	Trish Crossin	Labor

2001 Australian federal election: Senate, Northern Territory
Party	Candidate	Votes	%	±%
Quota		31,021		
Country Liberal	1. Nigel Scullion (elected 1); 2. John Lopes	40,680	43.71	+4.9
Labor	1. Trish Crossin (elected 2); 2. Olga Havnen	36,500	39.22	−2.0
Democrats	1. David Curtis; 2. Joe Faggion	6,796	7.30	+2.8
One Nation	1. Rob Phillips; 2. Jim King	4,353	4.68	−4.6
Greens	1. Melanie Ross; 2. Charlotte McCabe	3,978	4.27	+0.2
Group D	1. June Mills; 2. Gary Meyerhoff	650	0.70	+0.70
Citizens Electoral Council	Peter Flynn	105	0.11	+0.11
Total formal votes		93,062	97.24	−0.76
Informal votes		1,901	2.76	+0.76
Turnout		95,702	86.20	−4.40

== See also ==
- Candidates of the 2001 Australian federal election
- Members of the Australian Senate, 2002–2005
