= Members of the Australian Senate, 2008–2011 =

Government (32) – (7 seat minority) Labor (32) Opposition (37) Liberal (32) National Party (5) Crossbench (7) Greens (5) Family First (1) Independent (1)

This is a list of members of the Australian Senate between 1 July 2008 and 30 June 2011. Half of the state senators had been elected at the November 2007 election and had terms due to finish on 30 June 2014; the other half of the state senators were elected at the October 2004 election and had terms due to finish on 30 June 2011. The territory senators were elected at the November 2007 election and their terms ended at the next federal election, which was August 2010. The new Senate first met in August 2008, with state senators elected in 2007 sworn in on 26 August 2008.

Assuming party discipline, the Gillard Labor government needed the support of either the Coalition, or of all the other non-Coalition senators to pass legislation.

Senator	Party	State	Term ending	Years in office
Eric Abetz	Liberal	Tasmania	2011	1994–2022
Judith Adams	Liberal	Western Australia	2011	2005–2012
Mark Arbib	Labor	New South Wales	2014	2008–2012
Chris Back (Note: Western Australian Liberal Senator Chris Ellison resigned on 30 January 2009. Chris Back was appointed as his replacement on 12 March 2009.)	Liberal	Western Australia	2011	2009–2017
Guy Barnett	Liberal	Tasmania	2011	2002–2011
Cory Bernardi	Liberal	South Australia	2014	2006–2020
Catryna Bilyk	Labor	Tasmania	2014	2008–2025
Simon Birmingham	Liberal	South Australia	2014	2007–2025
Mark Bishop	Labor	Western Australia	2014	1996–2014
Ron Boswell	National	Queensland	2014	1983–2014
Sue Boyce	Liberal	Queensland	2014	2007–2014
George Brandis	Liberal	Queensland	2011	2000–2018
Bob Brown	Greens	Tasmania	2014	1996–2012
Carol Brown	Labor	Tasmania	2014	2005–present
David Bushby	Liberal	Tasmania	2014	2007–2019
Doug Cameron	Labor	New South Wales	2014	2008–2019
Kim Carr	Labor	Victoria	2011	1993–2022
Michaelia Cash	Liberal	Western Australia	2014	2008–present
Richard Colbeck	Liberal	Tasmania	2014	2002–2016, 2018–present
Jacinta Collins	Labor	Victoria	2014	1995–2005, 2008–2019
Stephen Conroy	Labor	Victoria	2011	1996–2016
Helen Coonan	Liberal	New South Wales	2014	1996–2011
Mathias Cormann	Liberal	Western Australia	2014	2007–2020
Trish Crossin	Labor	Northern Territory	2010, 2013 (Note: The term of a territory senator ends at the dissolution of the House of Representatives, which was August 2010.)	1998–2013
Alan Eggleston	Liberal	Western Australia	2014	1996–2014
Chris Ellison	Liberal	Western Australia	2011	1993–2009
Chris Evans	Labor	Western Australia	2011	1993–2013
Don Farrell	Labor	South Australia	2014	2008–2014, 2016–present
John Faulkner	Labor	New South Wales	2011	1989–2015
David Feeney	Labor	Victoria	2014	2008–2013
Alan Ferguson	Liberal	South Australia	2011	1992–2011
Steve Fielding	Family First	Victoria	2011	2005–2011
Concetta Fierravanti-Wells	Liberal	New South Wales	2011	2005–2022
Mitch Fifield	Liberal	Victoria	2014	2004–2019
Mary Jo Fisher	Liberal	South Australia	2011	2007–2012
Michael Forshaw	Labor	New South Wales	2011	1994–2011
Mark Furner	Labor	Queensland	2014	2008–2014
Sarah Hanson-Young	Greens	South Australia	2014	2008–present
Bill Heffernan	Liberal	New South Wales	2011	1996–2016
John Hogg	Labor	Queensland	2014	1996–2014
Gary Humphries	Liberal	Australian Capital Territory	2010, 2013	2003–2013
Annette Hurley	Labor	South Australia	2011	2005–2011
Steve Hutchins	Labor	New South Wales	2011	1999–2011
David Johnston	Liberal	Western Australia	2014	2002–2016
Barnaby Joyce	National	Queensland	2011	2005–2013
Helen Kroger	Liberal	Victoria	2014	2008–2014
Scott Ludlam	Greens	Western Australia	2014	2008–2017
Joe Ludwig	Labor	Queensland	2011	1999–2016
Kate Lundy	Labor	Australian Capital Territory	2010, 2013	1996–2015
Ian Macdonald	Liberal	Queensland	2014	1990–2019
Gavin Marshall	Labor	Victoria	2014	2002–2019
Brett Mason	Liberal	Queensland	2011	1999–2015
Anne McEwen	Labor	South Australia	2011	2005–2016
Julian McGauran	Liberal	Victoria	2011	1987–1990, 1993–2011
Jan McLucas	Labor	Queensland	2011	1999–2016
Christine Milne	Greens	Tasmania	2011	2005–2015
Nick Minchin	Liberal	South Australia	2011	1993–2011
Claire Moore	Labor	Queensland	2014	2002–2019
Fiona Nash	National	New South Wales	2011	2005–2017
Kerry O'Brien	Labor	Tasmania	2011	1996–2011
Stephen Parry	Liberal	Tasmania	2011	2005–2017
Marise Payne	Liberal	New South Wales	2014	1997–2023
Helen Polley	Labor	Tasmania	2011	2005–present
Louise Pratt	Labor	Western Australia	2014	2008–2014, 2016–2025
Michael Ronaldson	Liberal	Victoria	2011	2005–2016
Scott Ryan	Liberal	Victoria	2014	2008–2021
Nigel Scullion	National (Note: Northern Territory Senator Nigel Scullion was elected as a candidate of the Country Liberal Party, which is the equivalent of both the Nationals and Liberals in the Northern Territory. He sits with the Nationals and served as that party's deputy leader.)	Northern Territory	2010, 2013	2001–2019
Nick Sherry	Labor	Tasmania	2014	1990–2012
Rachel Siewert	Greens	Western Australia	2011	2005–2021
Ursula Stephens	Labor	New South Wales	2014	2002–2014
Glenn Sterle	Labor	Western Australia	2011	2005–present
Judith Troeth	Liberal	Victoria	2011	1993–2011
Russell Trood	Liberal	Queensland	2011	2005–2011
John Williams	National	New South Wales	2014	2008–2019
Penny Wong	Labor	South Australia	2014	2002–present
Dana Wortley	Labor	South Australia	2011	2005–2011
Nick Xenophon	Independent	South Australia	2014	2008–2017
