= President of the Australian Senate =

Presiding officer of the upper house of the Australian Parliament

President of the Senate
- Commonwealth Coat of Arms

- Flag of Australia

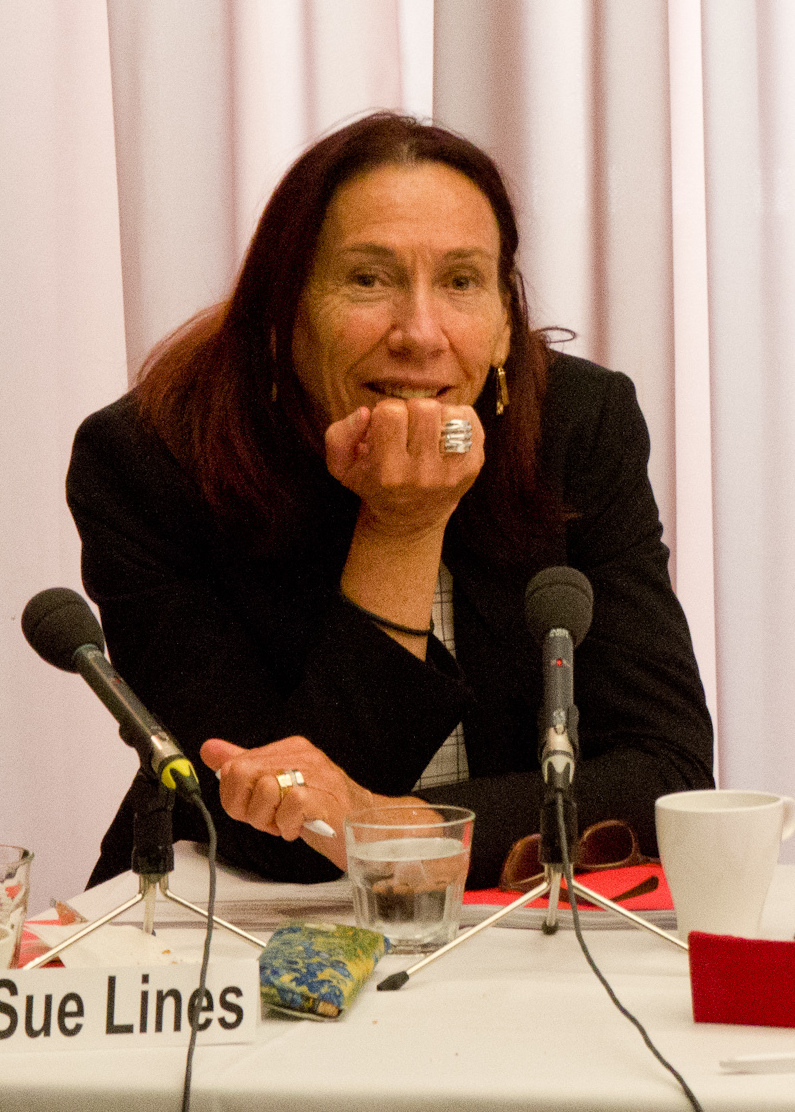
- Incumbent; Sue Lines since 26 July 2022
- Australian Senate
- Style: The Honourable
- Appointer: Elected by the Senate
- Inaugural holder: Sir Richard Baker
- Formation: 9 May 1901
- Deputy: Senator Slade Brockman
- Salary: A$369,674
- Website: aph.gov.au

The president of the Senate is the presiding officer of the Australian Senate, the upper house of the Parliament of Australia. The counterpart in the lower house is the speaker of the House of Representatives. The office of the presidency of the senate was established in 1901 by section 17 of the Constitution of Australia. The primary responsibilities of the office is to oversee senate debates, determine which senators may speak, maintain order and the parliamentary code of conduct during sessions and uphold all rules and orders of the senate. The current president is Sue Lines, who was elected on 26 July 2022.

The Senate elects one of its members as president at the start of each new term, or whenever the position is vacant. This is usually—though not necessarily—a member of the party or coalition that has formed government in the House of Representatives. Early presidents were members of the largest party or coalition in the Senate, which was not always the governing party, however this is no longer the case.

The president of the Senate's primary task is to maintain parliamentary procedure in the chamber during legislative sessions. Unlike the speaker of the House, the president of the Senate votes as an ordinary member during general debate, and has no casting vote in the case of a tie (a casting vote would effectively give the president's state an extra vote). The president of the Senate has also various administrative and ceremonial duties, sharing responsibility for the management of Parliament House and other parliamentary facilities and services with the speaker of the House.

== Election ==
=== Constitutional provisions ===
Section 17 of the Constitution of Australia provides:

The Senate shall, before proceeding to the despatch of any other business, choose a senator to be the President of the Senate; and as often as the office of President becomes vacant the Senate shall again choose a senator to be the President. The President shall cease to hold his office if he ceases to be a senator. He may be removed from office by a vote of the Senate, or he may resign his office or his seat by writing addressed to the Governor-General.

=== Process ===
The president is elected by the Senate in a secret ballot. The clerk conducts the election. The presidency has always been a partisan office and the nominee of the government party has nearly always been elected—although this cannot be guaranteed since the government of the day does not necessarily have a majority in the Senate. The president is assisted by an elected deputy president. The traditional practice has been that the government nominates a senator to be elected as president, and the Opposition nominates a Senator to be deputy president. If there are no other nominations, no election is required; however, the Australian Greens in 2005 and again in 2007 put forward Senator Kerry Nettle as a rival candidate when the position of president was vacant. Neither Government nor Opposition Senators supported that candidacy.

== Role ==
=== Parliamentary duties ===
The president's principal duty is to preside over the Senate, to maintain order in the Senate, uphold the Standing Orders (rules of procedure) and protect the rights of backbench senators. The president is assisted by the deputy president and a panel of acting deputy presidents, who usually preside during routine debates.

Although the president does not have the same degree of disciplinary power as the speaker does, the Senate is not as rowdy as most Australian legislative chambers, and thus his or her disciplinary powers are seldom exercised.

Unlike the speaker the president has a deliberative, but not a casting vote (in the event of an equality of votes, the motion fails). This is because the Senate is in theory a states' house, and depriving the president of a deliberative vote would have robbed one of the states or territories one of its senators' votes.

=== Administrative duties ===
The Senate president is the chief executive of the Department of the Senate, which is one of the four parliamentary departments. The president chairs the department's budget committee and oversees its organisational structure. The president also co-administers the Department of Parliament Services (DPS) with the speaker of the House of Representatives.

=== Ceremonial duties ===
The president of the Senate is ranked highly in the Commonwealth Table of Precedence, either before or after the speaker of the House of Representatives depending on seniority. The president participates in the state opening of parliament, represents the parliament on overseas visits, and receives visiting delegations from other countries (and other distinguished visitors).

== Salary ==
As with all other parliamentarians, the president of the Senate's salary is determined by the Remuneration Tribunal, an independent statutory body. As of 1 July 2019, the base salary for senators is A$211,242. The president is entitled to an additional "salary of office" comprising 75% of the base salary ($158,432), making for a total salary of $369,674 per annum and receives the various other entitlements and allowances available to senators.

== List of presidents of the Senate ==
The position of president of the Senate has been disproportionately held by senators representing the least populous states and territories. There have been 25 presidents of the Senate since 1901. Of these 15 have come from the least populous states (Western Australia, South Australia and Tasmania) or the Australian Capital Territory, and 10 have come from the three most populous states (New South Wales, Victoria and Queensland). All Senate presidents have been members of major parties, though not necessarily the governing party.

No.	Image	Name	Party	State	Term start	Term end
1		Sir Richard Baker	Free Trade	South Australia	9 May 1901	31 December 1906
2		(Sir) Albert Gould	Free Trade / Anti-Socialist	New South Wales	20 February 1907	30 June 1910
2		(Sir) Albert Gould	Liberal	New South Wales	20 February 1907	30 June 1910
3		Harry Turley	Labor	Queensland	1 July 1910	8 July 1913
4		Thomas Givens	Labor	Queensland	9 July 1913	30 June 1926
4		Thomas Givens	National Labor	Queensland	9 July 1913	30 June 1926
4		Thomas Givens	Nationalist	Queensland	9 July 1913	30 June 1926
5		Sir John Newlands	Nationalist	South Australia	1 July 1926	13 August 1929
6		Walter Kingsmill	Nationalist	Western Australia	14 August 1929	30 August 1932
6		Walter Kingsmill	United Australia	Western Australia	14 August 1929	30 August 1932
7		Patrick Lynch	United Australia	Western Australia	31 August 1932	30 June 1938
8		John Hayes	United Australia	Tasmania	1 July 1938	30 June 1941
9		James Cunningham	Labor	Western Australia	1 July 1941	4 July 1943
10		Gordon Brown	Labor	Queensland	23 September 1943	19 March 1951
11		Ted Mattner	Liberal	South Australia	12 June 1951	7 September 1953
12		(Sir) Alister McMullin	Liberal	New South Wales	8 September 1953	30 June 1971
13		Sir Magnus Cormack	Liberal	Victoria	17 August 1971	11 April 1974
14		Justin O'Byrne	Labor	Tasmania	9 July 1974	11 November 1975
15		(Sir) Condor Laucke	Liberal	South Australia	17 February 1976	30 June 1981
16		(Sir) Harold Young	Liberal	South Australia	18 August 1981	4 February 1983
17		Doug McClelland	Labor	New South Wales	21 April 1983	23 January 1987
18		Kerry Sibraa	Labor	New South Wales	17 February 1987	31 January 1994
19		Michael Beahan	Labor	Western Australia	1 February 1994	30 June 1996
20		Margaret Reid	Liberal	ACT	20 August 1996	18 August 2002
21		Paul Calvert	Liberal	Tasmania	19 August 2002	14 August 2007
22		Alan Ferguson	Liberal	South Australia	14 August 2007	25 August 2008
23		John Hogg	Labor	Queensland	26 August 2008	30 June 2014
24		Stephen Parry	Liberal	Tasmania	7 July 2014	2 November 2017
25		Scott Ryan	Liberal	Victoria	13 November 2017	13 October 2021
26		Slade Brockman	Liberal	Western Australia	18 October 2021	26 July 2022
27		Sue Lines	Labor	Western Australia	26 July 2022	Incumbent

== Deputy President ==
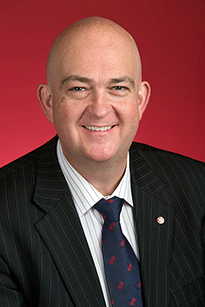
Slade Brockman (Lib), deputy president of the Senate since 22 July 2025

As well as a president, the Senate also elects a deputy president, whose formal title is Deputy President and Chairman of Committees. Until 1981, the title was just Chairman of Committees; it was changed "to reflect more accurately the nature of the office in practice". The position is not provided for by the constitution, but instead by the Senate's standing orders – it was borrowed more or less directly from the colonial legislative councils. The deputy president's main tasks are to preside over committees of the whole and to serve as presiding officer when the president of the Senate is absent.

=== List ===
There have been 36 deputy presidents of the Senate, two of whom served multiple non-consecutive terms.

#	Name	Party	State	Term start	Term end
1	Robert Best	Protectionist	Victoria	9 May 1901	31 December 1903
2	William Higgs	Labor	Queensland	16 March 1904	31 December 1906
3	George Pearce	Labor	Western Australia	21 February 1907	13 November 1908
4	Henry Dobson	Anti-Socialist	Tasmania	25 November 1908	30 June 1910
4	Henry Dobson	Liberal	Tasmania	25 November 1908	30 June 1910
5	David O'Keefe	Labor	Tasmania	1 July 1910	30 July 1914
6	George Henderson	Labor	Western Australia	9 October 1914	30 June 1917
6	George Henderson	National Labor	Western Australia	9 October 1914	30 June 1917
6	George Henderson	Nationalist	Western Australia	9 October 1914	30 June 1917
7	John Shannon	Nationalist	South Australia	12 July 1917	30 June 1920
8	Thomas Bakhap	Nationalist	Tasmania	21 July 1920	30 June 1923
9	John Newlands	Nationalist	South Australia	5 July 1923	30 June 1926
10	William Plain	Nationalist	Victoria	1 July 1926	30 June 1932
10	William Plain	United Australia	Victoria	1 July 1926	30 June 1932
11	Herbert Hays	United Australia	Tasmania	1 September 1932	23 September 1935
12	Burford Sampson	United Australia	Tasmania	24 September 1935	30 June 1938
13	James McLachlan	United Australia	South Australia	1 July 1938	30 June 1941
14	Gordon Brown	Labor	Queensland	1 July 1941	22 September 1943
15	Ben Courtice	Labor	Queensland	23 September 1943	1 November 1946
16	Theo Nicholls	Labor	South Australia	6 November 1946	19 March 1951
17	George Rankin	Country	Victoria	12 June 1951	30 June 1953
18	Albert Reid	Country	New South Wales	8 September 1953	22 May 1962†
19	Gerald McKellar	Country	New South Wales	7 August 1962	21 December 1964
20	Tom Drake-Brockman	Country	Western Australia	16 March 1965	11 November 1969
21	Tom Bull	Country	New South Wales	25 November 1969	30 June 1971
22	Edgar Prowse	Country	Western Australia	17 August 1971	31 December 1973
23	James Webster	Country / National Country	Victoria	5 March 1974	21 December 1975
–	Tom Drake-Brockman	National Country	Western Australia	17 February 1976	30 June 1978
24	Douglas Scott	National Country	New South Wales	15 August 1978	10 December 1979
25	Ron Maunsell	National Country	Queensland	19 February 1980	30 June 1981
26	Doug McClelland	Labor	New South Wales	20 August 1981	4 February 1983
27	David Hamer	Liberal	Victoria	21 April 1983	30 June 1990
28	Mal Colston	Labor	Queensland	21 August 1990	16 August 1993
29	Noel Crichton-Browne	Liberal	Western Australia	17 August 1993	9 May 1995
30	Margaret Reid	Liberal	ACT	9 May 1995	20 August 1996
–	Mal Colston	Independent	Queensland	20 August 1996	6 May 1997
31	Sue West	Labor	New South Wales	6 May 1997	30 June 2002
32	John Hogg	Labor	Queensland	19 August 2002	25 August 2008
33	Alan Ferguson	Liberal	South Australia	26 August 2008	30 June 2011
34	Stephen Parry	Liberal	Tasmania	4 July 2011	6 July 2014
35	Gavin Marshall	Labor	Victoria	7 July 2014	9 May 2016
36	Sue Lines	Labor	Western Australia	30 September 2016	26 July 2022
37	Andrew McLachlan	Liberal	South Australia	26 July 2022	22 July 2025
38	Slade Brockman	Liberal	Western Australia	22 July 2025	

== See also ==
- Clerk of the Australian Senate
