= Armadale Senior High School =

Location
- 169 South Western Highway, Armadale, Perth, Western Australia; Australia; 32°09′42″S 116°00′55″E

Information
- Type: Public co-educational specialist high school
- Motto: Aspire, strive and achieve
- Established: 1953; 73 years ago
- Educational authority: WA Department of Education
- Specialist: Academic Extension Program; Strive Intervention & Engagement Program; Specialist Visual Arts Program; Specialist Information Technology Program; Extension Music; Industry Program
- Principal: Shane Easton
- Years: 7–12
- Campus type: Suburban
- Colours: Royal blue, orange, red
- Website: www.ashs.wa.edu.au

Armadale Senior High School is a public co-educational specialist high school, located on the South Western Highway, in the Perth suburb of Armadale, Western Australia.

The school provides specialist programs in the areas of academic extension, visual arts, information technology and industry programs.

== Overview ==
Construction of the school commenced in 1952 and was opened as a District High School in 1953. The school became a senior high school in 1963 and still caters for students in Years 8 to 12. In 2015 Armadale Senior High School welcomed its first cohort of Year 7 students along with all other senior high schools across the state. The transition of year 7 students to high school finally brought Western Australia into line with all other Australian states.

The inaugural Principal was Carl Riedel who managed the school from 1953 to 1956. The next principal was Bill Walker who served from 1957 to 1959. Mary Griffiths, served the Armadale Senior High School community since 2007 as principal. As of 2019, the principal was Carol Daniels.

== Notable students ==
- Sue Lines, senator

== See also ==
- List of schools in the Perth metropolitan area
