= Sue Lines =

Australian politician (born 1953)

Senator The Honourable Sue Lines
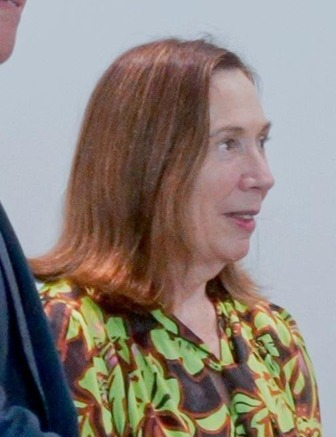
- Lines in 2024

President of the Australian Senate
- Incumbent
- Assumed office 26 July 2022
- Deputy: Andrew McLachlan; Slade Brockman
- Preceded by: Slade Brockman

Deputy President of the Australian Senate
- In office 30 September 2016 – 26 July 2022
- President: Stephen Parry; Scott Ryan; Slade Brockman
- Preceded by: Gavin Marshall
- Succeeded by: Andrew McLachlan

Senator for Western Australia
- Incumbent
- Assumed office 15 May 2013
- Preceded by: Chris Evans

Personal details
- Born: 15 December 1953 (age 72) Perth, Western Australia, Australia
- Party: Labor
- Education: Murdoch University
- Occupation: Trade union official
- Website: www.senatorsuelines.com

Susan Lines (born 15 December 1953) is an Australian politician who has served as a senator for Western Australia since 2013, representing the Australian Labor Party (ALP). She is the current president of the Australian Senate, having previously been deputy president of the Senate from 2016. Before entering politics she was the assistant national secretary of United Voice.

== Early life ==
Lines was born in Perth on 15 December 1953, the daughter of Nancy McRae and Jim Lines. Her parents later separated and she became close to her stepmother Mary Davies. Her father was born in England and came to Australia at the age of 12 as part of a child migration scheme, initially living at Fairbridge Farm. He served in World War II and later worked as a baker, carpenter and builder. Lines held British citizenship by descent until renouncing it prior to the 2013 election. Her maternal grandparents were Scottish.

Lines attended Gosnells Primary School and Armadale Senior High School. She completed a Bachelor of Education at Murdoch University and worked as a teacher from 1984 to 1985. Her mother, who died in 1976, was also a schoolteacher. In 1987, after a few years as a community organiser, Lines began working as a union organiser for what subsequently became United Voice. She became the assistant state secretary of the union in 2001 and assistant national secretary in 2007.

== Politics ==
Lines was elected to the state executive of the ALP in Western Australia in 1990 and the national executive in 2002. She was a delegate to national conference and a delegate to state conference in both Western Australia and New South Wales at various points. She served on the ALP's national policy committee from 2007 to 2009.

=== Senate ===
In 2013, Lines was nominated by the ALP to fill a casual vacancy caused by the resignation of Senator Chris Evans, another former United Voice official. At the time of her endorsement she was living in Sydney. She was formally appointed to the Senate on 15 May 2013 and elected to a six-year term in her own right at the 2016 federal election.

Lines has served on a number of Senate committees. She was elected Deputy President of the Senate in September 2016 in succession to Gavin Marshall. She is the third woman to have held the position, after Margaret Reid and Sue West. In 2018, as chair of the Senate's procedure committee, she led an inquiry into the use of the Lord's Prayer to open parliamentary sittings which recommended that the practice should continue.

In July 2022, following the ALP's victory at the 2022 federal election, Lines was elected President of the Senate in succession to Slade Brockman. She is the second woman elected to the position, after Margaret Reid, and the first woman from the ALP to be elected president.

In July 2025, following Labor's re-election at the 2025 federal election, Lines was re-elected as President of the Senate, defeating Senator Penny Allman-Payne for the position, (55 votes for Lines; 12 votes for Allman-Payne).

=== Political positions ===
Lines is a member of the Labor Left faction.

Lines opposes the use of mandatory immigration detention. In 2014, she stated that immigration minister Scott Morrison had "blood on his hands" following the death of Reza Barati at the Manus Regional Processing Centre. In the same year she was reportedly reprimanded by opposition leader Bill Shorten after stating that government announcements on Islamic State were "a shield to try and deflect from the awful mess they're in with their budget". In 2016 she was one of four Labor MPs to publicly call for all detainees on Manus Island to be settled in Australia, in opposition to existing party policy.

In 2019, Lines told the launch of the WA Labor Friends of Palestine that the Israel lobby is "powerful within the party and outside of the party" and was influencing ALP policy on the Israeli–Palestinian conflict. In response, Alexander Ryvchin of the Executive Council of Australian Jewry accused her of "play[ing] to people's fears and prejudices" and making "dog-whistle allusions to supposed Israel lobby influence over Australian politics".

Lines supports shifting the date of Australia Day from 26 January. In January 2021 she stated that it "celebrates white supremacy and the legacy of colonisation that is directly linked to the various ways we continue to fail First Nations people".

Parliament of Australia
Preceded by Slade Brockman	President of the Australian Senate; 2022–present	Incumbent
