= Jeannie Ferris =

Australian politician

Chief Government Whip in the Senate
- In office 22 August 2002 – 2 April 2007
- Prime Minister: John Howard
- Preceded by: Paul Calvert
- Succeeded by: Stephen Parry

Senator for South Australia
- In office 1 July 1996 – 12 July 1996
- Preceded by: Baden Teague
- Succeeded by: Herself
- In office 24 July 1996 – 2 April 2007
- Preceded by: Herself
- Succeeded by: Simon Birmingham

Personal details
- Born: 14 March 1941 Auckland, New Zealand
- Died: 2 April 2007 (aged 66) Canberra, ACT, Australia
- Party: Liberal Party of Australia
- Spouse: Bob Ferris (divorced)
- Children: 2
- Education: Monash University (BSc)

Jeannie Margaret Ferris (née Whitlow; 14 March 1941 – 2 April 2007) was an Australian politician, lobbyist, journalist, and Liberal Senator for South Australia.

== Early life ==
Ferris was born in Auckland, New Zealand. She was educated at Monash University, where she graduated in agricultural economics.

Ferris moved to Canberra in 1967 where she was a journalist with The Canberra Times and the Australian Broadcasting Corporation. She was a member of the Canberra Press Gallery. She later worked as a lobbyist for the National Farmers Federation for several years.

== Senate ==
During the period between her endorsement as a candidate for the 1996 election and 1 July 1996, when she took her seat, Ferris was employed by Senator Nick Minchin. It was suggested that this constituted holding "an office of profit under the Crown", which under section 44 of the Constitution could have rendered her election invalid, although the writ had not been returned and she was technically not a senator-elect. To avoid any possibility of this, she resigned from the Senate on 12 July 1996, and on 24 July was re-appointed by the Parliament of South Australia to the vacancy caused by her own resignation.

Ferris was Deputy Government Whip in the Senate from 2001 to 2002 and was Government Whip in the Senate from August 2002 until her death.

A year after her diagnosis with ovarian cancer in October 2005, Ferris formed a parliamentary inquiry into gynaecological cancers with Senators Lyn Allison and Claire Moore, which led to a unanimous report across party lines calling for increased research and awareness of the cancers. The Commonwealth Government later agreed to the report's recommendations.

=== Bartlett incident ===
In December 2003, Ferris was involved in the resignation of Senator Andrew Bartlett as leader of the Australian Democrats, after an incident at Parliament House. Bartlett had earlier in the evening stolen five bottles of wine from a Liberal Party Christmas function, which Ferris had sent staff to retrieve. At around 10:30 pm, Ferris confronted Bartlett, who was drunk. Bartlett approached Ferris on the floor of the Senate chamber, allegedly grabbing her arm and calling her a "fucking bitch". He then supposedly followed her out of the chamber while verbally abusing her. The next morning Bartlett apologised in writing to Ferris, although she considered the inclusion of a bottle of wine with Bartlett's letter of apology "quite inappropriate ... as an apology for drunken behaviour involving abuse and a physical attack."

== Illness and death ==
Ferris was diagnosed with ovarian cancer in October 2005 and succumbed to the disease in Canberra, on 2 April 2007. She was survived by two sons, Robert and Jeremy. Her former husband, Bob Ferris, with whom she maintained a close friendship since their divorce in the 1980s, was killed in a road accident three days later on 5 April 2007.

Following Jeannie's death, a DVD produced by Kay Stammers with support from the Australian Government Department of Health and Ageing was dedicated in her memory.

Simon Birmingham was appointed on 3 May 2007 to fill the casual vacancy created by Jeannie Ferris's death. He had already been selected to replace Ferris as a candidate at the 2007 federal election.
