= Stephen Parry (Australian politician) =

Australian politician

The Honourable Stephen Parry
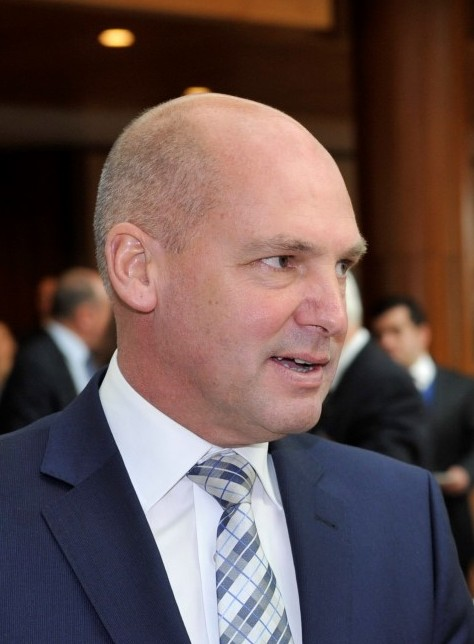

President of the Senate
- In office 7 July 2014 – 2 November 2017
- Deputy: Gavin Marshall; Sue Lines
- Preceded by: John Hogg
- Succeeded by: Scott Ryan

Deputy President of the Senate
- In office 4 July 2011 – 6 July 2014
- Preceded by: Alan Ferguson
- Succeeded by: Gavin Marshall

Senator for Tasmania
- In office 1 July 2005 – 2 November 2017
- Preceded by: Shayne Murphy
- Succeeded by: Richard Colbeck

Personal details
- Born: Stephen Shane Parry; 31 October 1960 (age 66) Burnie, Tasmania, Australia
- Party: Liberal Party of Australia
- Children: 2
- Occupation: Police officer Funeral director

Stephen Shane Parry (born 31 October 1960) is an Australian politician who was a Liberal Party senator for Tasmania from 2005 to 2017. He was elected President of the Senate in 2014. On 31 October 2017, Parry informed the government that he may be a British citizen, and issued his intention to resign from his position if dual nationality was confirmed. The next day he reported that he had received confirmation of his dual citizenship and, on 2 November, he resigned as president and from the Senate. He was replaced in the Senate by next Liberal Party Tasmanian Senate candidate and former senator Richard Colbeck after a recount.

== Early life ==
Parry was born on 31 October 1960 in Burnie, Tasmania, to William Stephen ("Bill") Parry and Patricia Dawn Evans; his father had been born in Liverpool, UK and had emigrated to Australia in the 1950s. He was educated at Burnie's Marist Regional College, after which he enrolled at the Tasmania Police Academy in Hobart.

== Career ==
Parry was employed as an officer with the Tasmanian Police from 1977 to 1986, and was promoted to detective in 1983. After leaving the police force, he completed a certificate in Mortuary Science at the Australian College of Funeral Service, and was a funeral director from 1986 to 2004, becoming president of the Australian Funeral Directors Association.

Parry performed a significant role in the wake of the 1996 Port Arthur massacre, acting as the Team Leader of the Embalming Team. Parry was also president of the Burnie Chamber of Commerce and Industry from 2000 to 2004, and a director of the Tasmanian Chamber of Commerce and Industry from 2000 to 2005.

== Politics ==
=== Howard government 2004–2007 ===
In 2004, Parry was elected to the Australian Senate for the state of Tasmania as a member of the Liberal Party of Australia. He was elected government deputy whip in the Senate in November 2006 and government whip in April 2007 in succession to the late Senator Jeannie Ferris.

=== Opposition 2007–2013 ===
Senator Parry was elected opposition whip after the 2007 federal election, and on 16 February 2009, in addition to his role as whip, he was appointed manager of opposition business in the Senate.

On 4 July 2011, Parry was elected by the Senate as the deputy president and chairman of committees, replacing Alan Ferguson.

=== Abbott and Turnbull Governments 2013–2017 ===
On 7 July 2014, the Senate elected him as its president.

==== Resignation ====
On 31 October 2017, Parry informed the government he believed he may be a British citizen through descent, which would disqualify him from sitting in Parliament under Section 44 of the Constitution. The next day he confirmed he did indeed hold dual British-Australian citizenship and announced he would be resigning as senate president and Senator for Tasmania on 2 November 2017.

Upon the election of his successor, there was all-party praise for Parry's performance as President.

Parry's senate position was filled by Richard Colbeck who was sworn in on 12 February 2018.

== Post-politics ==
In 2019, Parry was appointed to the Administrative Appeals Tribunal as a part-time member with an initial term of seven years.

On 15 June 2024, Parry was announced as the Liberal Party candidate for the Liberal-held seat of Montgomery in the Tasmanian Legislative Council for the 2025 periodic election, but was ultimately unsuccessful.

On 13 June 2025, Parry was announced as part of the Liberal Party slate for the seat of Braddon in the Tasmanian House of Assembly for the 2025 snap election, but was again unsuccessful.

Parliament of Australia
Preceded by John Hogg	President of the Australian Senate; 2014–2017	Succeeded by Scott Ryan
