= Lyn Allison =

Australian politician

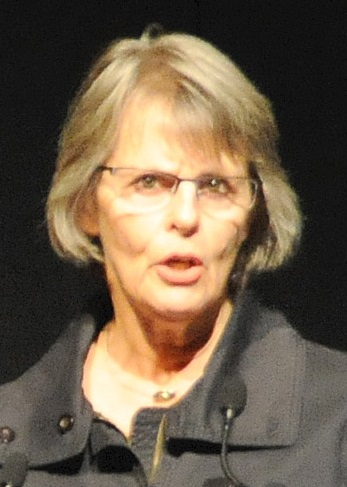

President of the Australian Democrats
- Incumbent
- Assumed office 5 October 2019
- Vice President(s): Elana Mitchell; Steve Baty; Dr Grahame Elder
- Preceded by: Elisa Resce

9th Leader of the Australian Democrats
- In office 3 November 2004 – 30 June 2008
- Deputy: Andrew Bartlett
- Preceded by: Andrew Bartlett
- Succeeded by: Darren Churchill

8th Deputy Leader of the Australian Democrats
- In office 30 June 2002 – 3 November 2004
- Leader: Andrew Bartlett
- Preceded by: Aden Ridgeway
- Succeeded by: Andrew Bartlett

Senator for Victoria
- In office 1 July 1996 – 30 June 2008
- Preceded by: Siegfried Spindler
- Succeeded by: David Feeney

Personal details
- Born: Lynette Fay Allison; 21 October 1946 (age 80) Melbourne, Victoria, Australia
- Party: Australian Democrats
- Domestic partner(s): Peter Hudson (esp. 1981)
- Children: 2
- Education: Viewbank College
- Alma mater: University of Melbourne
- Occupation: School teacher (St Joseph's Technical School) (Department of Education)
- Profession: Academic; Politician

Lynette Fay Allison (born 21 October 1946) is an Australian politician. She was a member of the Australian Senate from 1996 to 2008, representing the state of Victoria. As of October 2019 she is the national president of the Australian Democrats.

== Early life and background ==
Allison was born in Melbourne, Victoria, and grew up in the suburb of Fairfield with her younger brother and sister. Her father was a fitter and turner and her mother was involved in the local church, bowls club, and school tuckshop. Allison was educated at Rosanna High School, and left briefly in year 10 to become a dental nurse, before returning to complete high school. From 1964 to 1986 she worked as an administrator. She gained a Bachelor of Education at the University of Melbourne, and from 1987 to 1991 was a high school art teacher at St Joseph's Technical School Abbotsford and St Paul's College in Altona North.

== Political career ==
Allison was an Independent councillor of the City of Port Melbourne from 1992 to 1994.

In 1994, Allison contested the state by-election for the Victorian Legislative Assembly district of Williamstown after the resignation of Joan Kirner, the former Premier of Victoria. Standing as the Democrat candidate, Allison gained 39% of the two-candidate preferred vote, with the seat won by Labor candidate Steve Bracks.

=== Australian Senate ===
Allison won pre-selection on the Democrats ticket, was elected to the Australian Senate in 1996, and re-elected for a second term in the 2001 federal election.

Between 1998 and 2006, Allison served on the Legislation and References Committees for Environment, Recreation (later Information Technology), Communications and the Arts; and for Community Affairs. She served as Senate Select for Superannuation (1996–98); the Victorian Casino Inquiry (1996); the Lucas Heights Reactor (2000); Medicare (2003–04); and Mental Health (2005). From 1999 to 2001 Allison chaired an inquiry into the health effects of mobile phone towers. In 2002 she was a member of the Parliamentary Delegation to New Zealand.

In August 2002 Allison, along with fellow senators Aden Ridgeway, John Cherry, and Andrew Murray, succeeded in forcing Natasha Stott Despoja to resign from leadership. The media did not portray the spill kindly, labelling them the 'Gang of Four'. Allison was Deputy Leader of the Australian Democrats from 2002 to 2004. On 3 November 2004, following the resignation of Andrew Bartlett after the October 2004 election, she was elected unopposed as Leader. She took over the leadership at a time when the Democrats were at their lowest ever public opinion rating since the party was founded in 1977.

On 5 December 2006, Allison introduced into the Senate a bill titled the Cluster Munitions (Prohibition) Bill 2006, which, if enacted, would prevent Australia from using, possessing and manufacturing cluster munitions. Two months earlier, she had travelled to Lebanon to survey the damage caused by cluster munition use in the 2006 Israel-Lebanon War. Allison, a leading feminist in the Australian parliament, was among a cross-party group of female parliamentarians who introduced legislation into parliament in 2006 which effectively legalised the supply of the abortion pill RU486. She advocated for federal government funding for public schools and nuclear disarmament.

=== 2007 Election ===
The 2007 federal election, including a half-Senate election, was called for 24 November, and the Democrats national campaign launched in Melbourne, Allison's home state, on 10 November. The official slogan 'bring back balance' referred to the contest for the balance of power in the Senate. Allison's seat was up for election along with three other Democrats senators (Natasha Stott Despoja, Andrew Murray and Andrew Bartlett) and was considered vulnerable after the Democrats poor performance in the 2004 election when the last Senate seat was won by Family First and the Coalition government gained control of the Senate for the first time in over 25 years.

During the 2007 election campaign, Allison announced a national preference deal with the Greens to increase the chance of a progressive party taking the balance of power in the Senate. Allison joined Bob Brown and Kate Lundy in a joint political advertisement sponsored by GetUp! urging voters to prevent the Senate from becoming a rubber stamp for the government of the day.

Allison received the support of community and interest groups such as the Asylum Seeker Resource Centre, for her support for refugees and asylum seekers; the Friends of the ABC, for promoting public broadcasting; and endorsements by prominent women and feminists such as Barbara Spalding and Anne Summers.

The Democrats failed to retain their seats in the Senate, with Allison losing her seat to the Labor Party candidate David Feeney. Allison's term expired on 30 June 2008, leaving the Australian Democrats with no federal representation for the first time since its founding in 1977.

== Return to politics ==
Allison is a board member of eight organisations including Berry Street, Vision Australia, Alzheimer's Australia and her local nursing home. In 2012 Lyn Allison was inducted into the Victorian Honour Roll of Women for being a member of the Australian Senate from 1996 to 2008.

On 5 October 2019, Allison became the 12th President of the Australian Democrats, resuming an active role within the party.

== Personal life ==
Allison married when she was 21 years old, and three years later they bought a home in East St Kilda for about $11,000. They later divorced. She now lives in Port Melbourne with her long-term partner.

She was Director of the Employment and Economic Development Corporation.

Allison is an atheist who spoke first for the affirmative in a 2008 Australian Radio National debate "Would We Be Better Off Without Religion?".

She was awarded the Australian Humanist of the Year award in 2008 for her work in education, environment and women's rights.

== Gallery ==
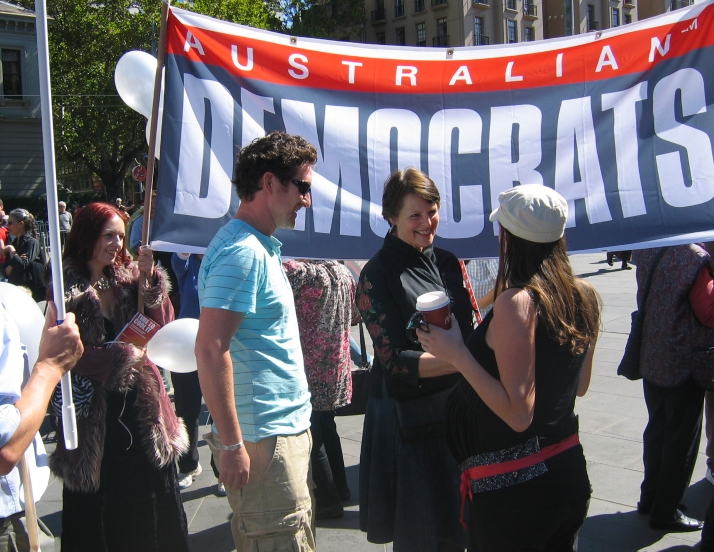
Senator Allison talks with constituents at the Palm Sunday nuclear disarmament rally 2007

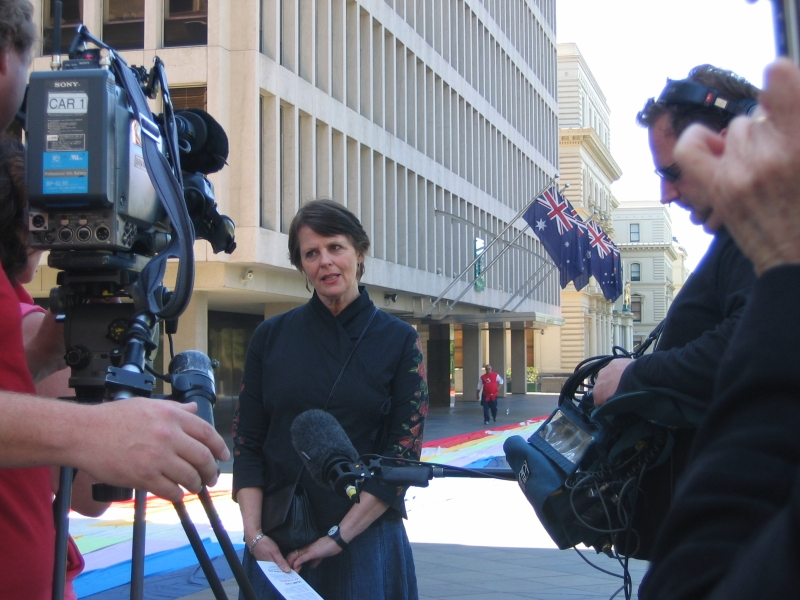
Senator Allison addresses the ABC cameras at Treasury Gardens, Melbourne 2007

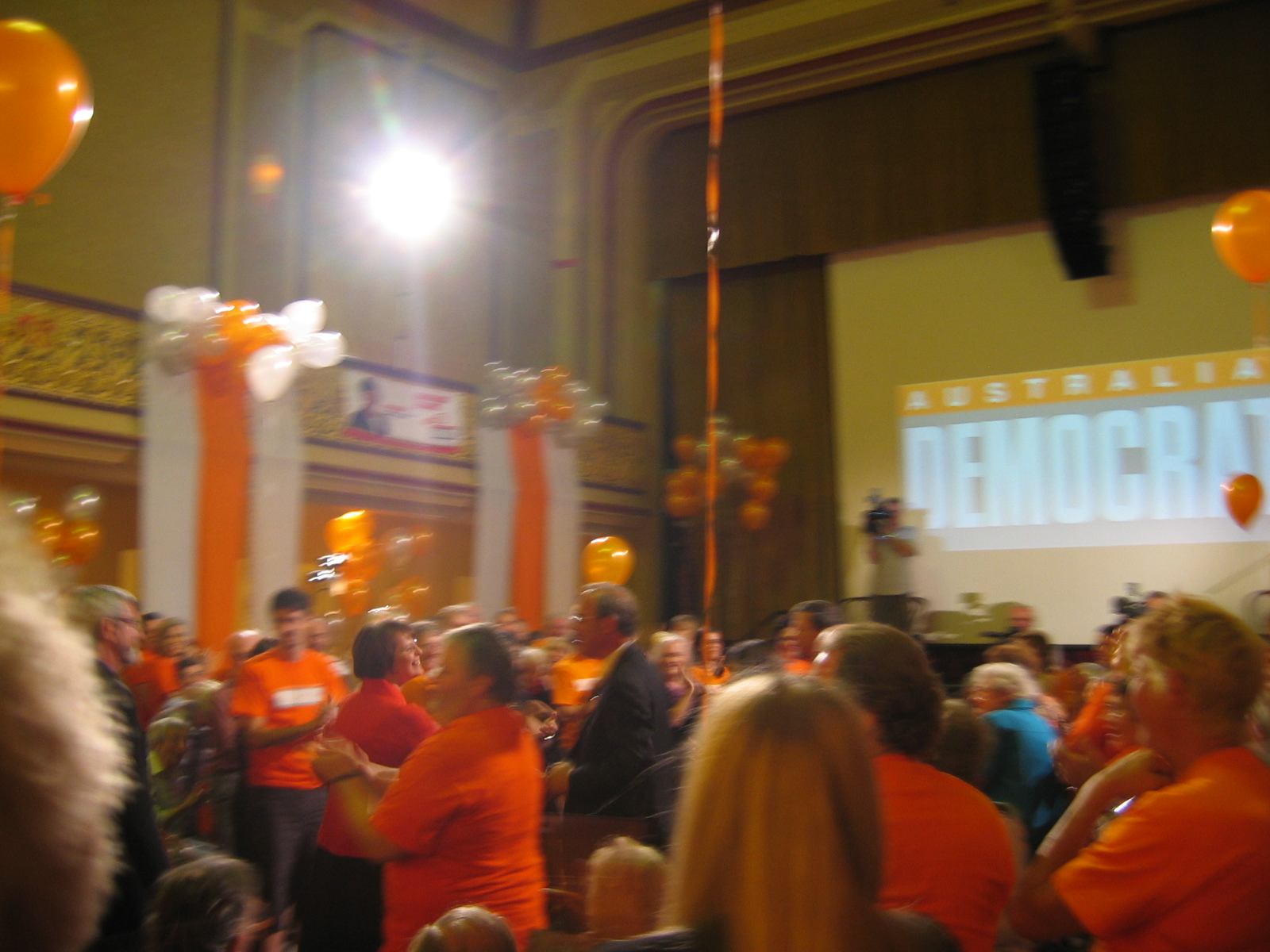
Senator Allison leads fellow Democrat senators into national federal election campaign launch in Melbourne, 2007

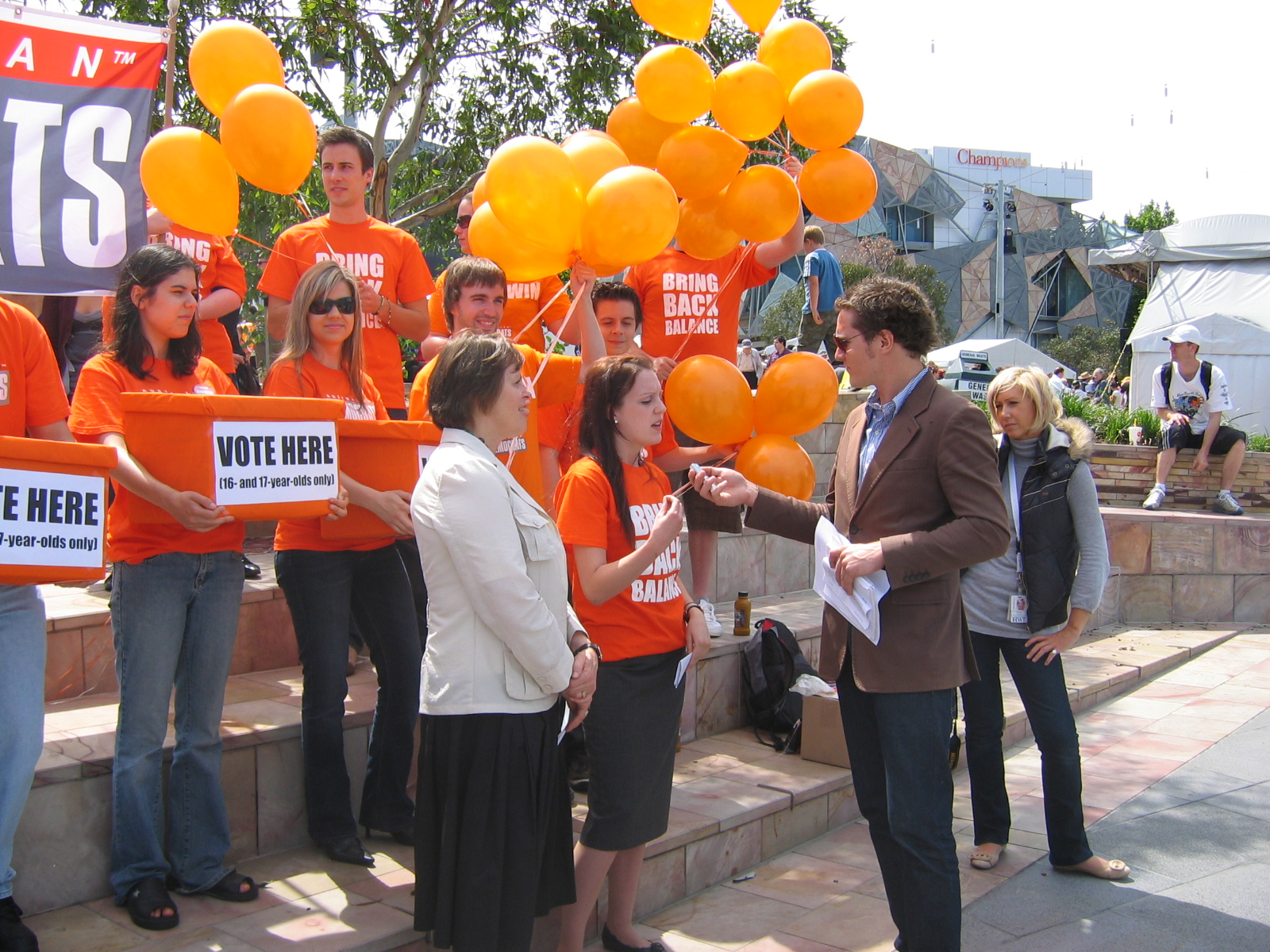
Senator Allison with Laura Chipp and Young Australian Democrats candidates during election campaign in Melbourne 2007

== Bibliography ==
- Lyn Allison, Senate Biography
- Senate Report of the Inquiry into Electromagnetic Radiation 2001
- Allison, Lyn; Wright, Tim. "Nuclear Madness Threatens Us All". Herald Sun. Archived from the original on 15 June 2011.

Party political offices
Preceded by Andrew Bartlett	Leader of the Australian Democrats; 2004–2008	Succeeded by Darren Churchill
