= John Hogg =

Australian politician

The Honourable John Hogg
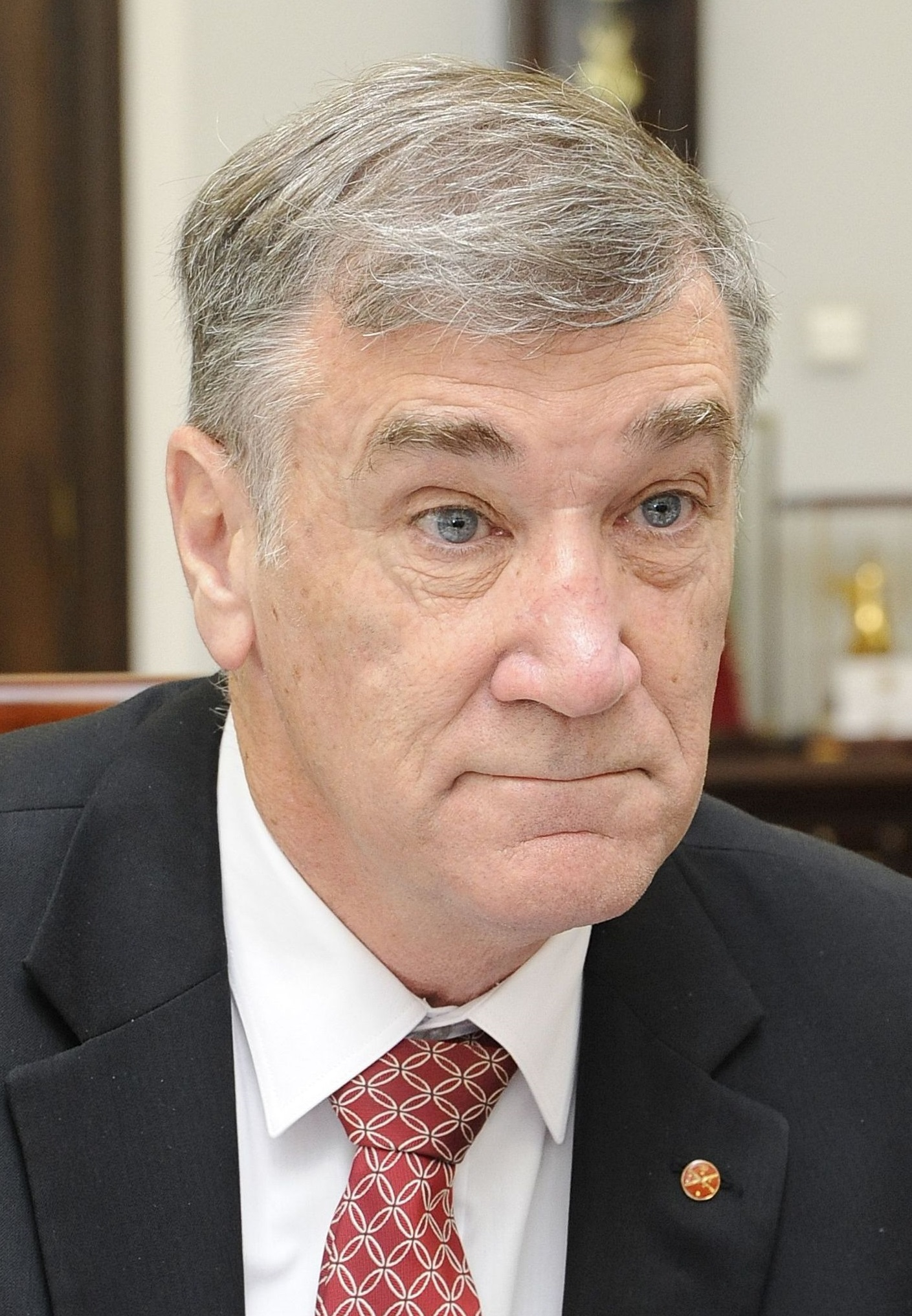

President of the Senate
- In office 26 August 2008 – 30 June 2014
- Deputy: Alan Ferguson; Stephen Parry
- Preceded by: Alan Ferguson
- Succeeded by: Stephen Parry

Deputy President of the Senate
- In office 19 August 2002 – 25 August 2008
- President: Paul Calvert; Alan Ferguson
- Preceded by: Sue West
- Succeeded by: Alan Ferguson

Senator for Queensland
- In office 1 July 1996 – 30 June 2014
- Preceded by: Gerry Jones
- Succeeded by: Chris Ketter

Personal details
- Born: John Joseph Hogg; 19 March 1949 (age 77) Brisbane, Queensland
- Party: Labor
- Education: St Joseph's College, Gregory Terrace; University of Queensland
- Occupation: Unionist

John Joseph Hogg (born 19 March 1949) is a former Australian politician who served as a Senator for Queensland from 1996 to 2014, representing the Labor Party. He served as President of the Senate from 2008 to 2014.

== Early life ==
Hogg was born in Brisbane to Francis Patrick and Catherine Frances Hogg. He attended St Joseph's College, Gregory Terrace and then the University of Queensland, where he graduated with a Bachelor of Science. He later completed a Diploma in Primary Teaching at Kedron Park Teachers College, now part of the Queensland University of Technology, and he taught at both primary and secondary schools. He was an official with the Shop, Distributive and Allied Employees Association (SDA) from 1976 to 1996. In 1978 he married Susan Mary Lynch, and subsequently raised two daughters and a son.

== Politics ==
Hogg joined the ALP in 1976 and became an active member in the organization, attending the Queensland State Conference as a delegate in 1981 and the National Conference in 1984. He became a member of the ALP's Administrative Committee in 1982 and eventually a representative on the National Executive. He continued to rise within the party, eventually becoming the Chair of the ALP National Policy Committee (Government Administration) in 1991.

=== Senate ===
Hogg was preselected as first candidate on the ALP ticket for the Queensland Senate to replace retiring Gerry Jones in 1996. A member of the Labor Right faction, he defeated the Socialist Left candidate Jeff Slowgrove 76 to 72. He was elected and took office as Senator on 1 July 1996. In August 2002 Hogg was elected Deputy President and Chairman of Committees. After the ALP won government in 2007, Hogg was elected to replace Alan Ferguson as President of the Senate.

On 10 August 2012, Hogg said that he would be retiring from politics at the end of his term. He did not contest the 2013 federal election. His terms as senator and President of the Senate expired on 30 June 2014.

Parliament of Australia
Preceded by Alan Ferguson	President of the Australian Senate; 2008–2014	Succeeded by Stephen Parry
