= Ruth Webber =

Australian politician

Senator for Western Australia
- In office 1 July 2002 – 30 June 2008

Personal details
- Born: 24 March 1965 (age 61) Melbourne, Victoria
- Party: Australian Labor Party

Ruth Stephanie Webber (born 24 March 1965) is an Australian politician. She was a Labor member of the Australian Senate from 2002 to 2008, representing the state of Western Australia.

== Early life ==
Webber was born in Melbourne on 24 March 1965. Her grandfather Paul Green was the Victorian state president of the Australian Workers' Union.

Webber joined the ALP in 1984. She was assistant coordinator of the Women's Electoral Lobby from 1985 to 1986. She was first elected as a delegate to ALP state and national conferences in 1986. Prior to her own election to parliament, Webber worked as a staffer for state housing minister Jim McGinty from 1992 to 1993 and as an electorate officer for Senator Chris Evans from 1993 to 1997. She was subsequently assistant state secretary of the ALP in Western Australia from 1998 to 2001.

== Senate ==
At the 2001 federal election, Webber was elected to the Senate in second position on the ALP's ticket in Western Australia, winning a six-year term beginning on 1 July 2002. She was a member of a number of Senate committees and also served as a deputy whip from 2004 to 2008.

In November 2004, Webber was charged with wilfully misleading police and driving a vehicle on a suspended licence. The charges related to an incident on the day of the 2004 election, where she was "caught speeding in her Commonwealth car in Perth's northern suburbs [...] while travelling between polling booths". Webber was convicted of driving while suspended in March 2005 and fined $200, while the charge of misleading police was ultimately withdrawn.

In October 2006, Webber was relegated to third position on the ALP's Senate ticket for the next federal election, with Louise Pratt taking the higher position on the ticket. The following month, she reportedly voted for Kevin Rudd over incumbent leader Kim Beazley in an ALP leadership spill. Webber failed to win re-election at the 2007 federal election with her term concluding on 30 June 2008. She was the last candidate to be eliminated, with Greens candidate Scott Ludlam winning the final seat.

=== Positions ===
In August 2006, Webber stated she would support a private member's bill to extend stem cell research in Australia and would co-sponsor a bill being prepared by Democrats senator Natasha Stott Despoja.

Webber publicly criticised the 457 visa scheme in September 2006, stating businesses were abusing the scheme to bring in cheap foreign labour while local workers were unemployed.

== Later activities ==
In 2009, as part of a review of the Gold Pass scheme for former federal MPs, it was reported that Webber had received nearly $50,000 of free air travel between July and December 2008. The following year, The West Australian reported that she was working as a lobbyist for Halden Burns and had taken "147 flights worth $116,662 between June 2008 and June 2010 but was forced to repay 20 flights worth $18,855 after a Finance Department audit of her taxpayer-funded travel".

In January 2015, Webber became chief executive officer of Down Syndrome Australia, at which time she was also deputy president of the Mental Illness Fellowship of Western Australia and a board member of Women's Health Works and Carers Western Australia. She resigned as CEO in June 2016.
