= Gavin Marshall =

Australian politician

Deputy President of the Australian Senate
- In office 7 July 2014 – 9 May 2016
- President: Stephen Parry
- Preceded by: Stephen Parry
- Succeeded by: Sue Lines

Senator for Victoria
- In office 1 July 2002 – 30 June 2019
- Preceded by: Barney Cooney
- Succeeded by: Jess Walsh

Personal details
- Born: Gavin Mark Marshall; 25 March 1960 (age 66) Reservoir, Victoria, Australia
- Party: Labor
- Occupation: Electrician

Gavin Mark Marshall (born 25 March 1960) is a former Australian politician, who was an Australian Labor Party member of the Australian Senate from July 2002 until June 2019, representing the state of Victoria.

Marshall was born in Melbourne and was an electrician and official with the Electrical Trades Union before entering politics.

On 7 July 2014, Marshall was elected Deputy President of the Senate, serving in that position until 9 May 2016.
