= Steve Hutchins =

Australian politician

Senator for New South Wales
- In office 14 October 1998 – 30 June 2011
- Preceded by: Belinda Neal

Personal details
- Born: 22 April 1956 Cronulla, New South Wales
- Died: 24 November 2017 (aged 61) Katoomba, New South Wales
- Party: Australian Labor Party
- Spouse(s): 1) Diane Beamer; 2) Natalie Sykes
- Education: University of Sydney; Harvard University
- Occupation: Union official

Stephen Patrick Hutchins (22 April 1956 – 24 November 2017) was an Australian politician and a member of the Australian Senate for the state of New South Wales (NSW) between October 1998 and June 2011, representing the Australian Labor Party.

== Early life and career ==
Hutchins was born in Sydney. He worked as a forklift driver and waste collector before attending the University of Sydney, where he graduated in arts, and then Harvard University, where he was part of the university's trade union education programme. He was an official with the Transport Workers' Union from 1980 and was Federal President of the union from 1993 to 1998. He was a member of the Australian Council of Trade Unions Executive from 1996 to 1998.

On 14 October 1998 Hutchins was elected as a senator for New South Wales. He was elected again in 2004 but defeated in 2010, his term ending in 2011.

== Family and personal life ==
His first marriage was to New South Wales State Member for Mulgoa, Diane Beamer. His second marriage was to Natalie Sykes, who later became a Victorian state minister.

Hutchins died on 24 November 2017, aged 61.
