= Kerry Nettle =

Australian politician

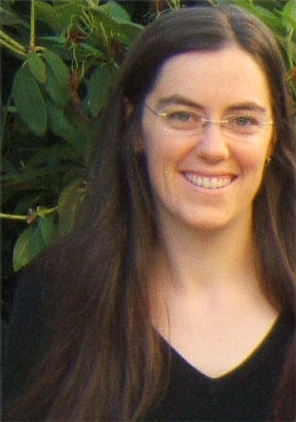

Senator for New South Wales
- In office 1 July 2002 – 30 June 2008

Personal details
- Born: 24 December 1973 (age 52) Sydney, New South Wales
- Party: Australian Greens
- Website: www.kerrynettle.org.au

Kerry Michelle Nettle (born 24 December 1973) is a former Australian Senator and member of the Australian Greens in New South Wales. Elected at the 2001 federal election on a primary vote of 4.36 percent with One Nation and micro-party preferences, she failed to gain re-election at the 2007 federal election, despite an increase in the Green primary vote to 8.43 percent, due to insufficient preferences.

== Early life ==
Kerry Nettle was born 24 December 1973, in Sydney, to Edward and Beverley Nettle. She grew up in the suburb of Marsfield, and received her primary education at local government schools, and secondary education at the Presbyterian Ladies' College, Sydney in Croydon where she was elected school captain in her final year. Following graduation from high school in 1991, Nettle enrolled at the University of New South Wales, where she obtained a degree in environmental science and was active in student politics, caucusing with the group known as the Non-Aligned Left (the predecessor of the Grassroots Left). She worked as office coordinator for The Greens (NSW) and then as a youth worker. She joined the Australian Greens in 1998 and was elected to the Australian Senate for New South Wales in November 2001, joining Senator Bob Brown until her term expired on 30 June 2008.

Nettle is a social liberal and an environmentalist. She believes in Government ownership of essential services, which include banking, airlines, telecommunications, health and education, and other areas privatised in the last two decades in Australia. She argues that private ownership of these assets is "social theft."

== Policies ==
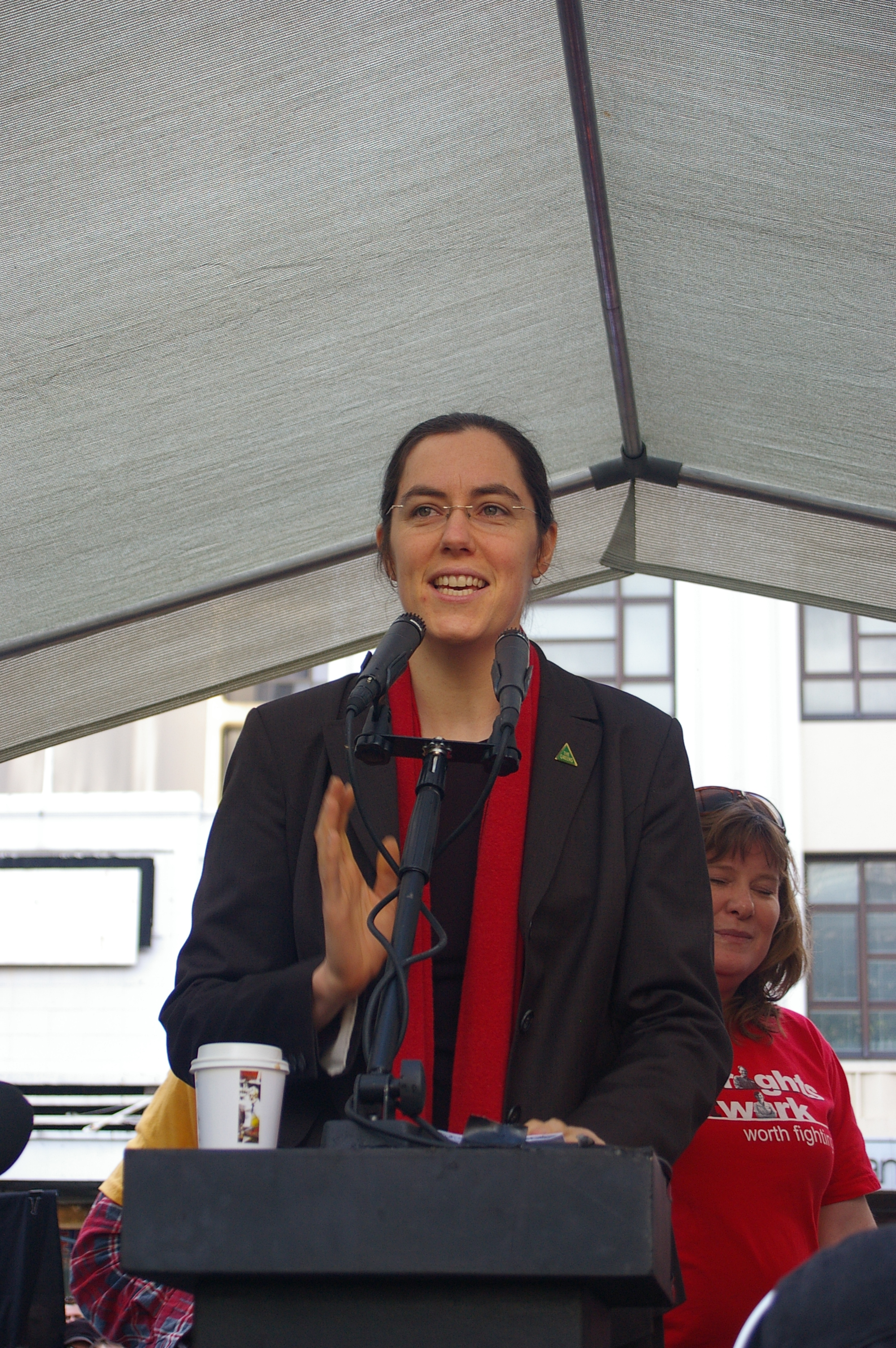
Kerry Nettle speaking at a rally during APEC Australia 2007

=== Immigration and human rights ===
Nettle strongly supports the right of political refugees and asylum seekers to have a fair process and hearing in Australia. She visited Christmas Island in January 2006 in opposition to the Australian Government's detention of 43 West Papuans that landed on Cape York in January 2006. She has expressed similar concern for the 83 Sri Lankan refugees that are being held in Nauru.

Nettle also fervently campaigned to bring David Hicks back to Australia. For six months, every day that the Australian Senate sat, she filed a motion to bring David Hicks back to Australia.

=== Iraq War ===
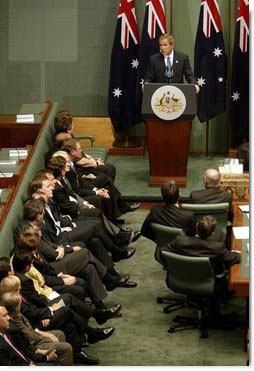
George W. Bush addresses the joint sitting of Australian Parliament in 2003

When United States President George W. Bush visited Canberra on 23 October 2003, Nettle and Brown took their opposition to the war in Iraq to the point of interjecting during his address to a joint sitting of the two Houses of Parliament. They wore signs referring to David Hicks and Mamdouh Habib, two Australian citizens who were then being held at Guantanamo Bay, Cuba, following their apprehension by United States forces in either (this is disputed) Afghanistan or Pakistan. Both Habib and Hicks have since been released.

Bush accepted the interjections with good humour, but the Speaker of the House, Neil Andrew, formally "named" Nettle and Brown and they were suspended from the Parliament for 24 hours. Nettle tried to hand Bush a letter from Habib's wife but was stopped by Liberal MPs and Senators who jostled her and prevented her from approaching Bush. Liberal Senator Ross Lightfoot allegedly told Nettle to "Fuck off and die."

=== Israeli-Palestinian conflict ===
Nettle visited Israel and the Palestinian territories in January 2007, where she examined "what impact the construction of the separation wall and the ongoing Israeli-Palestinian conflict has on communities in Palestine and Israel". Nettle spoke with both Israelis and Palestinians in an effort to understand and ameliorate conflicts between both groups.

=== Education ===
Nettle remains an ardent advocate of increased public education and higher education funding. Specifically, she has also "identified the need for $7 billion in public education spending across the lifelong spectrum of education, from preschool through to university and TAFE tertiary education."

=== Women's rights ===
Nettle supports gender equality, as well as a women's reproductive rights. During a debate on the abortion drug RU486 in February 2006, she wore a T-shirt into parliament bearing the slogan "Mr Abbott get your rosaries off my ovaries", in reference to the Catholic faith of Health Minister Tony Abbott.

== See also ==
- Members of the Australian Senate, 2002-2005
- Members of the Australian Senate, 2005-2008
- Women in the Australian Senate
- 2007 Australian federal election
- List of Old Girls of PLC Sydney
