= Russell Trood =

Australian politician

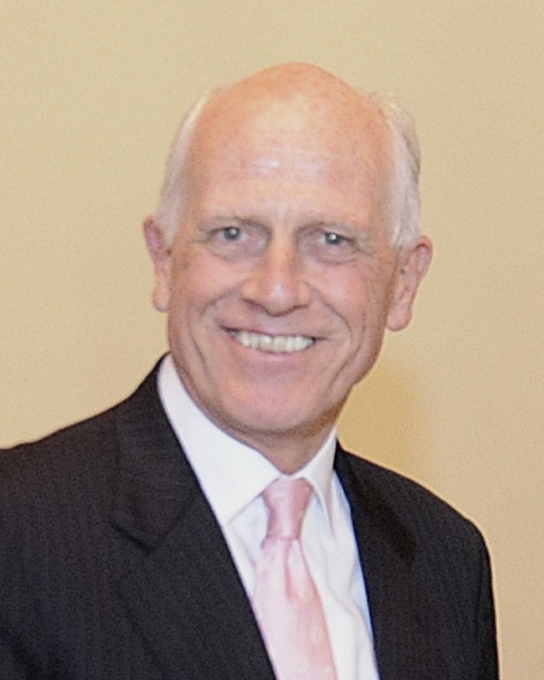
- Trood in 2011

Senator for Queensland
- In office 1 July 2005 – 30 June 2011

Personal details
- Born: 5 December 1948 Melbourne, Victoria, Australia
- Died: 9 January 2017 (aged 68) Brisbane, Queensland, Australia
- Party: Liberal Party of Australia
- Education: University of Sydney; University of Wales; Dalhousie University
- Occupation: Academic

Russell Brunell Trood (5 December 1948 – 9 January 2017) was a Liberal Party Senator for the state of Queensland, Australia. His surprise election as the third Liberal from Queensland in the 2004 Australian federal election, along with 38 other Coalition Senators, gave the federal government of John Howard a majority in the Senate, and thus control of both houses of Parliament. He did not retain his seat in the 2010 Australian federal election. His term in the Senate ended on 30 June 2011.

== Education ==
He was previously Associate Professor of International Relations in the Department of International Business and Asian Studies at Griffith University. He worked alongside the academic Colin Mackerras.

Dr Trood trained in law (the LLB) at the University of Sydney, had a master's degree in strategic studies from the University of Wales and a PhD in international relations from Dalhousie University, Canada.

== Career ==
Trood was Deputy Chair of the Senate Standing Committee on Foreign Affairs, Defence and Trade, a member of the Joint Standing Committee on Foreign Affairs, Defence and Trade, Senate Standing Committee on Legal and Constitutional Affairs and co-chair of the Joint Standing Committee for the Library.

Dr Trood was a member of the Foreign Affairs Council, the Board of the Australian Indonesia Institute, the Australian Committee of Pacific Economic Cooperation Council (AUSPECC).

He was the Director of the Centre for the Study of Australia-Asia relations (CSAAR) at Griffith University from 1991 to 2003. He was a member of the Australian Committee of the Council for Security Cooperation in the Asia-Pacific (CSCAP) and the Queensland Council of the Australian Institute of International Affairs.

He authored numerous articles and chapters in journals and books on security and foreign policy issues and was a frequent media commentator on these matters. His publications include: The Emerging Global Order: Australian Foreign Policy in the 21st Century (2008); Power Shift: Challenges for Australia in Northeast Asia (2004); Strategic Culture in the Asia-Pacific (2000); Bilateralism in a Multilateral Era (1997); The Asia-Australia Survey 1996–97 (1996); The Future Pacific Economic Order: Australia's Role (1993) and The Indian Ocean: Perspectives on a Strategic Arena (1985).

== Post-career and later life ==
In 2012, Trood became the United Nations Association of Australia (UNAA) National President replacing Professor Sen. Robert Hill AC.

In February 2016, Trood was diagnosed with an aggressive form of thyroid cancer. He died in January 2017.
