= Alan Ferguson (politician) =

Australian politician

The Honourable Alan Ferguson AM
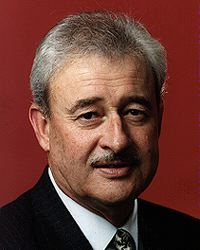

President of the Australian Senate
- In office 14 August 2007 – 25 August 2008
- Preceded by: Paul Calvert
- Succeeded by: John Hogg

Senator for South Australia
- In office 26 May 1992 – 30 June 2011
- Preceded by: John Olsen

Personal details
- Born: Alan Baird Ferguson; 16 September 1943 (age 83) Maitland, South Australia
- Party: Liberal Party of Australia
- Education: Scotch College, Adelaide
- Profession: Farmer, politician, insurance consultant

Alan Baird Ferguson AM (born 16 September 1943) is an Australian former politician who was a Liberal member of the Australian Senate representing South Australia from May 1992 to June 2011. He served as the 22nd President of the Australian Senate from August 2007 to August 2008.

Ferguson was born in Maitland, South Australia. He became a farmer, then a manager of farms, and then an insurance consultant. Before entering politics, Ferguson was educated at Weetulta Rural School and later at Scotch College in Adelaide. He was president of the South Australian Division of the Liberal Party from 1990 to 1992.

For eight years until his election as President of the Senate in 2007, Ferguson chaired the influential Joint Standing Committee on Foreign Affairs, Defence and Trade in the Australian Parliament.

Ferguson decided not to run again in the 2010 election, and his final term ended on 30 June 2011.

Political offices
Preceded by Paul Calvert	President of the Australian Senate; 2007–2008	Succeeded by John Hogg
