= Paul Calvert (politician) =

Australian politician

The Honourable Paul Calvert AO
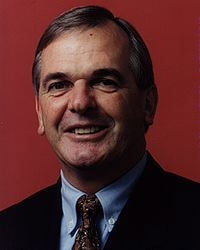

President of the Australian Senate
- In office 19 August 2002 – 14 August 2007
- Preceded by: Margaret Reid
- Succeeded by: Alan Ferguson

Senator for Tasmania
- In office 11 July 1987 – 29 August 2007
- Succeeded by: David Bushby

Personal details
- Born: Paul Henry Calvert; 19 January 1940 (age 86) Hobart, Tasmania
- Party: Liberal

Paul Henry Calvert, AO (born 19 January 1940) is a former Australian politician who served as a Senator for Tasmania from 1987 to 2007, representing the Liberal Party. He was President of the Senate from 2002 to 2007.

== Early life ==
Born into a long established farming family based outside Hobart, Calvert still runs a property in Tasmania. He was active in local government, serving as Warden (the title later changed to Mayor) of the City of Clarence, on Hobart's eastern shore. He was also President of the Royal Agricultural Society of Tasmania.

== Politics ==
In 1987 he was elected to the Australian Senate, after declining an invitation by the then Liberal Premier of Tasmania, Robin Gray, to run for the House of Assembly after a successful career in local government and agri-politics. He was re-elected in 1990, 1996 and 2001.

In 1997 Calvert became the government's Senate Whip. He became president following Margaret Reid in 2002, and was re-elected in 2005. Early in his presidency he tackled the archaic five department structure of the Australian Parliament, and achieved a streamlining to 3 departments – one for each Chamber and one looking after joint services.

On 7 August 2007 Calvert announced his intention to resign his position as President of the Senate on 14 August and to resign as a Senator for Tasmania before the Senate resumed on 10 September. He was succeeded as Senate President by South Australian Liberal Senator Alan Ferguson. He formally resigned as a Senator on 29 August 2007.

== Later life and honours ==
In 2008 he was appointed a member of the Governing Council of Old Parliament House in Canberra. As part of the 2009 Queen's Birthday Honours list, he was appointed an Officer of the Order of Australia.

Political offices
Preceded by Margaret Reid	President of the Australian Senate; 2002–2007	Succeeded by Alan Ferguson
