= LaRouche criminal trials =

1980s United States state and federal fraud trials

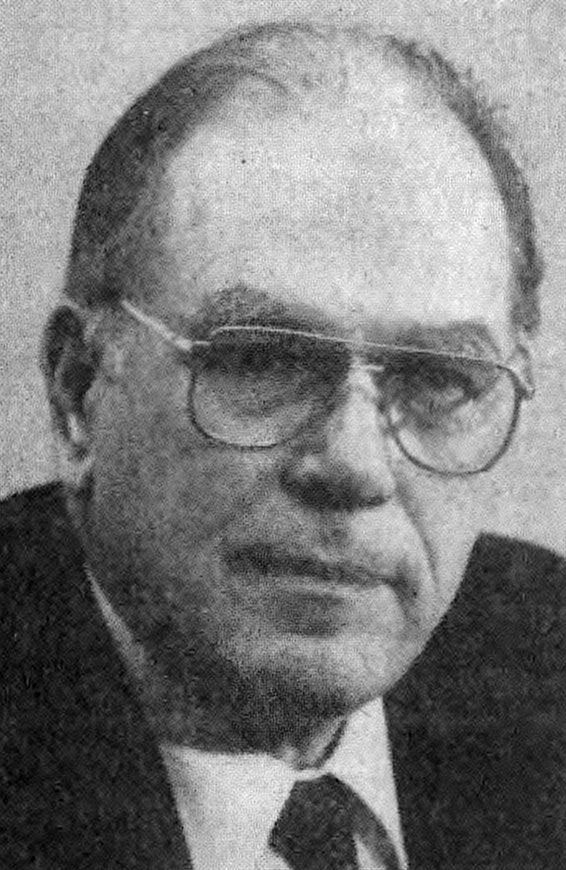
LaRouche circa 1988.

The LaRouche criminal trials in the mid-1980s stemmed from federal and state investigations into the activities of American political activist Lyndon LaRouche and members of his movement. They were charged with conspiring to commit fraud and soliciting loans they had no intention of repaying. LaRouche and his supporters disputed the charges, claiming the trials were politically motivated.

In 1986, hundreds of state and federal officers raided LaRouche offices in Virginia and Massachusetts. A federal grand jury in Boston indicted LaRouche and 12 associates on credit card fraud and obstruction of justice. The subsequent trial, described as an "extravaganza", was repeatedly delayed and ended in mistrial. Following the mistrial, a federal grand jury in Alexandria, Virginia, indicted LaRouche and six associates. After a short trial in 1988, LaRouche was convicted of mail fraud, conspiracy to commit mail fraud, and tax evasion, and was sentenced to prison for fifteen years. He entered prison in 1989 and was paroled five years later. At the same trial, his associates received lesser sentences for mail fraud and conspiracy. In separate state trials in Virginia and New York, 13 associates received terms ranging from one month to 77 years. The Virginia state trials were described as the highest-profile cases that the state Attorney General's office had ever prosecuted. Fourteen states issued injunctions against LaRouche-related organizations. Three LaRouche-related organizations were forced into bankruptcy after failing to pay contempt of court fines.

Defense lawyers filed numerous unsuccessful appeals that challenged the conduct of the grand jury, the contempt fines, the execution of the search warrants and various trial procedures. At least ten appeals were heard by the United States court of appeals, and three were appealed to the U.S. Supreme Court. Former U.S. Attorney General Ramsey Clark joined the defense team for two appeals. Following the convictions, the LaRouche movement mounted failed attempts at exoneration.

== Background ==
Beginning in the late 1960s and early 1970s, Lyndon LaRouche formed a variety of political organizations, including the U.S. Labor Party and the National Democratic Policy Committee. These organizations served as the platforms for presidential campaigns by LaRouche starting in 1976, and by his followers in scores of local races. According to one candidate, supporters viewed LaRouche as "the greatest political leader and economist of the 20th century, and they're proud to be associated with him. They feel he's leading the battle to save Western civilization." The Survey of Jewish Affairs, 1987 called the LaRouche movement one of the two most prominent "extremist political groups" of 1986.

The movement's greatest electoral success came in 1986 when two supporters, Janice Hart and Mark J. Fairchild, won the Democratic Party nominations for Illinois Secretary of State and Lieutenant Governor. Both lost in the general election. Also in 1986, the "Prevent AIDS Now Initiative Committee" (PANIC) got an initiative on the California ballot, Proposition 64 (also known as the "LaRouche Initiative"), which attracted widespread opposition and was defeated that November.

== Investigations ==
=== Early 1980s ===
According to arguments made by LaRouche's attorneys in later appeals, the government investigations were started under the FBI's COINTELPRO in the 1960s. Edward Spannaus, a defendant in the trials, further notes that there was a memorandum written on January 12, 1983, by former FBI chief William Webster to Oliver "Buck" Revell, head of the Bureau's General Investigative Division. It requested information on the funding of LaRouche and the U.S. Labor Party, including whether the U.S. Labor Party might be funded by hostile intelligence agencies. The LaRouche organization asserts that this formulation was specifically tailored to enable FBI "active measures" against LaRouche under Executive Order 12333, which permits such measures if a political movement receives foreign funding. The memo was eventually obtained by LaRouche's attorneys and submitted as an exhibit in the 1987 trial of LaRouche and co-defendants in Boston.

In August 1982, former Secretary of State Henry Kissinger sent a memo to Webster requesting an investigation of the LaRouche movement due to their "increasingly obnoxious" harassment of him, which was raised later at a meeting of the President's Foreign Intelligence Advisory Board by senior member David Abshire. Revell replied to Kissinger that there was sufficient evidence to proceed with an investigation. The FBI conducted an investigation but did not find evidence of a violation of Kissinger's civil rights. The investigation was closed in late 1983.

=== Mid-1980s ===
In the mid-1980s, the U.S. government and eleven states began investigations into alleged financial improprieties by LaRouche groups. A federal grand jury reportedly began investigating "an extensive nationwide pattern of credit card fraud" by LaRouche organizations in November 1984. That same year a New Jersey bank froze the accounts of LaRouche's 1984 presidential campaign due to allegedly fraudulent credit card charges.

In January 1985, a grand jury in Boston subpoenaed documents from the National Democratic Policy Committee (NDPC) and three other LaRouche organizations: Caucus Distributors Inc., Fusion Energy Foundation, and Campaigner Publications Inc. Seven weeks later, on March 29, 1985, a federal district court judge, A. David Mazzone, held them to be in contempt and fined them $45,000 per day. The fines for all the organizations eventually totaled over $20 million. The same grand jury subpoenaed Elliot I. Greenspan, an official of Caucus Distributors Inc., to appear but he pleaded the Fifth Amendment and refused to testify. He was granted immunity and compelled to testify but only did so after being jailed for contempt for two days. A spokesman for LaRouche called the investigation "a political terror operation".

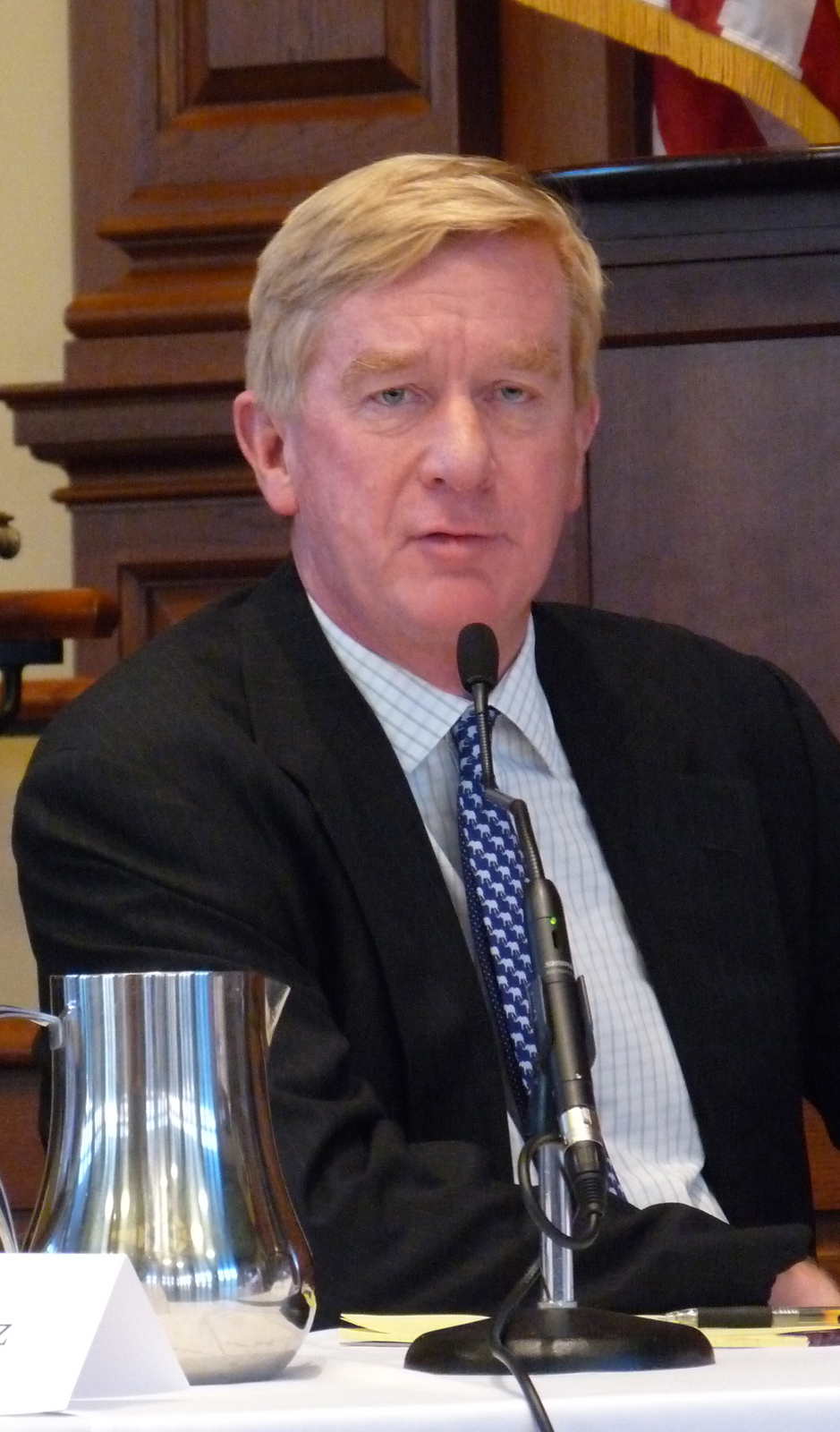
William Weld in 2008.

Investigations by a separate federal grand jury in Alexandria, Virginia, along with state agencies in New York, California, Minnesota, Illinois and Washington were also underway. The FBI, IRS, FEC and personnel of other federal agencies were conducting separate investigations. The Internal Revenue Service revoked the tax-exempt status of the Fusion Energy Foundation in September 1985, and a year later the State of New York sought to dissolve the corporation, alleging that it used "persistently fraudulent and illegal" means to solicit donations. U.S. Attorney William Weld announced in January 1986, that he would convene a national conference "to coordinate a prosecutive and investigative effort" against LaRouche. The conference was held the following month in Boston. Three states, Alaska, Indiana and Maryland, banned fundraising by Caucus Distributors Inc. in May 1986, due to the sale of unregistered promissory notes. The Illinois Secretary of State began civil proceedings against Caucus Distributors Inc. in June 1986, seeking an injunction to bar deceptive business practices. Minnesota officials banned "Independent Democrats for LaRouche" from fundraising, an order that was affirmed on appeal to the U.S. Supreme Court.

LaRouche lawyers filed a series of related civil suits against individuals, agencies and businesses. They sued Weld and former Attorney General William French Smith to try to stop the FBI investigation of the credit card case. They sued the New Jersey bank that had frozen their credit card merchant accounts; and they sued Chemical Bank in a similar suit. Edward Spannaus, a treasurer for LaRouche campaigns, filed complaints with the state bar and the U.S. Justice Department against one of the Assistant U.S. Attorneys in the case.

== Raid and indictments ==
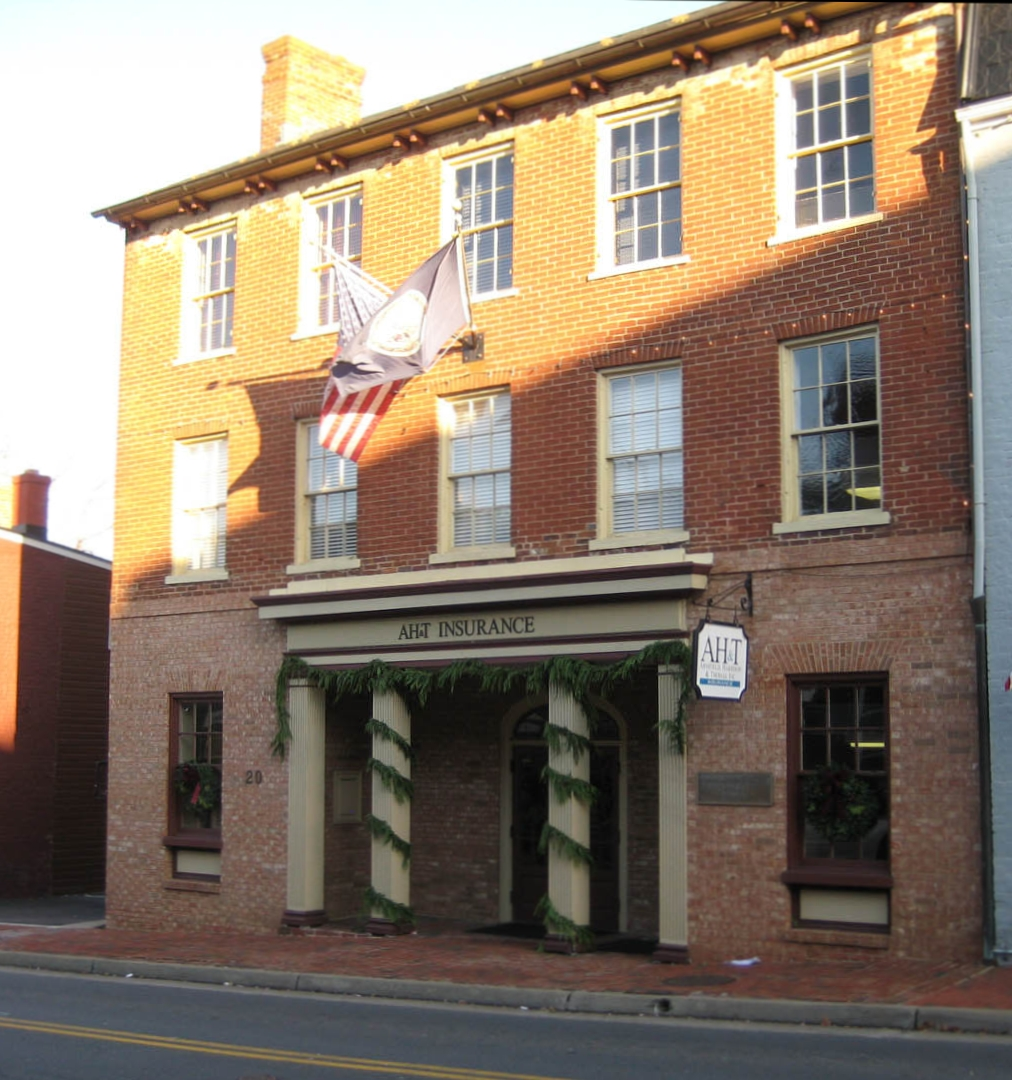
The Wheat Building in Leesburg, Virginia: one of the buildings searched during the 1986 raid.

Beginning October 6, 1986, the Leesburg, Virginia, headquarters of the LaRouche organization was searched in a coordinated, two-day raid by hundreds of officers of the FBI, IRS, other federal agencies, and Virginia state authorities, supported by armored cars and a helicopter. The agents also surrounded LaRouche's heavily guarded estate for the duration of the search but did not enter it. While surrounded, LaRouche sent a telegram to President Ronald Reagan saying that an attempt to arrest him "would be an attempt to kill me. I will not submit passively to such an arrest, but ... I will defend myself". He later assured that he would comply peaceably with any warrant. LaRouche offices in Quincy, Massachusetts, were searched as well. US Attorney Henry E. Hudson held a press conference to say that the searches had recovered subpoenaed materials, including notebooks and index cards.

Warren J. Hamerman, Chair of the NDPC, said the searches "conducted by Donald Regan's associate William Weld's forces against presidential candidate Lyndon LaRouche's headquarters coincides with Don Regan's desperate attempts to maintain the cover-up on AIDS". LaRouche later said that the Soviet Premier had ordered the raid as part of an assassination attempt. "The man with the mark of the beast on his head, Mikhail Gorbachov, has demanded my elimination", said LaRouche. In his 1987 autobiography, he wrote that the raid was ordered by Raisa Gorbachev, whom he described as outranking her husband in the nomenklatura due to her leadership of the Soviet Cultural Fund.

On the same day as the Leesburg search, the Boston grand jury handed down a 117-count indictment that named ten LaRouche associates, two corporations, and three campaign committees. Authorities charged them with making unauthorized credit charges that defrauded $1 million from over 1,000 people. The charges also included a scheme to raise funds by soliciting loans with no intention of repaying them. The National Caucus of Labor Committees was charged, along with others, of conspiring to obstruct justice. Prosecutors charged that defendants had burned records, sent potential grand jury witnesses out of the country, and failed to provide subpoenaed evidence. The indictment quoted LaRouche telling an associate that, in reaction to legal problems, "we are going to stall, tie them up in the courts ... just keep stalling, stall and appeal, stall and appeal". Three of the indicted associates remained at large for over a year, and investigators were allegedly given false information. On June 30, 1987, the U.S. grand jury in Boston indicted LaRouche on one count of conspiracy to obstruct justice.

Meanwhile, the state cases were progressing. On February 16, 1987, the Commonwealth of Virginia indicted 16 LaRouche associates on securities fraud and other felonies. On March 3, 1987, the State of New York indicted 15 LaRouche associates on charges of grand larceny and securities fraud.

== Involuntary bankruptcy ==
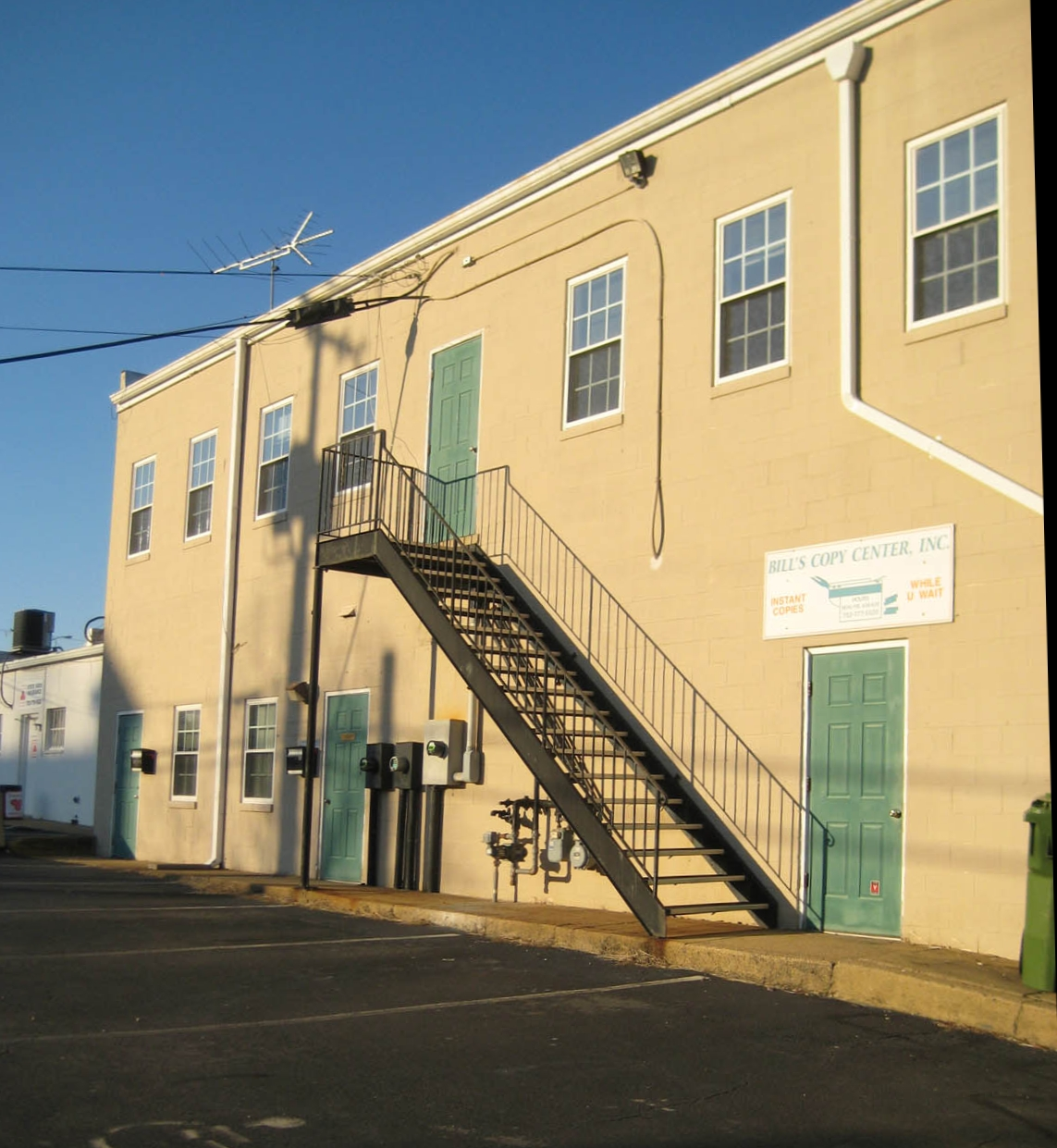
Former Fusion Energy Foundation headquarters, photographed in 2008

In early April 1987, the government charged in court that LaRouche organizations may have been trying to sell properties for cash to more easily conceal their assets and avoid paying $21.4 million in contempt of court fines. The U.S. Department of Justice filed an involuntary bankruptcy petition on April 20, 1987, to collect the debt from Caucus Distributors Inc., Fusion Energy Foundation, and Campaigner Publications Inc. In a rare procedure, the companies were seized before the bankruptcy came to trial. Assistant U.S. Attorney S. David Schiller wrote in a brief that the debtors had a "pattern of transferring or commingling substantial corporate assets to their members and other insiders for little or no consideration and for non-business purposes". The trustees later reported they were only able to locate about $86,000 in assets.

The bankruptcy halted the publication of a weekly newspaper, New Solidarity, and a bi-monthly science magazine, Fusion. At least one publication, Fusion, was reborn with a new name but the same editor and material.

The attorneys who represented the LaRouche entities in the bankruptcy trial filed a brief stating that the action was unprecedented and improper, alleging that it deviated from the standard rules of involuntary bankruptcy, and that members of the Alexandria prosecution team from the second criminal trial were involved in the planning and execution of the bankruptcy.

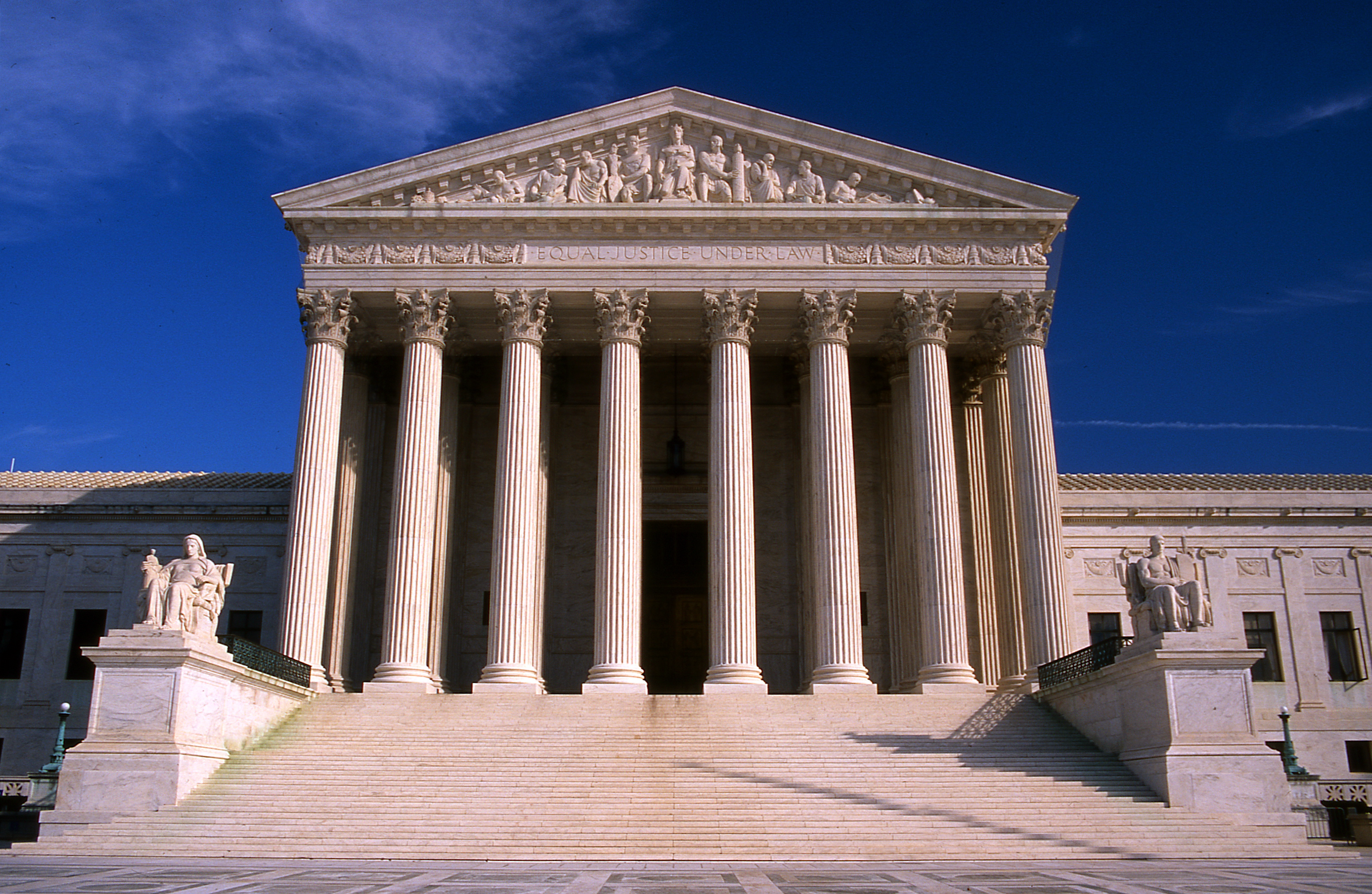
Several decisions were appealed to the U.S. Supreme Court.

During the bankruptcy trial in September 1989, an FBI agent destroyed evidence (credit card receipts, cancelled checks, and FEC filings) immediately after he had promised the court he would preserve them. On October 25, 1989, Judge Martin V.B. Bostetter dismissed the government's involuntary bankruptcy petition, finding that two of the entities involved were nonprofit fund-raisers and therefore not subject to involuntary bankruptcy actions. According to the LaRouche movement, Bostetter said the government's actions amounted to bad faith regardless of whether government agents and attorneys had intended this outcome. He found that the government's actions and representations in obtaining the bankruptcy had the effect of misleading the court as to the status of the organization, leading to a "constructive fraud on the court". In 1993, an appeals court decision said that Bostetter had specifically rejected that view, and said that the defendants had "greatly distorted the character of much of the evidence". Appeals that went all the way up to the U.S. Supreme Court found that the matter of the involuntary bankruptcy would not change the outcome of LaRouche's conviction.

The LaRouche organization asserts that it has proof, obtained under the Freedom of Information Act, which shows that the purpose of the bankruptcy was simply to shut down the affected entities rather than to collect fines. The U.S. Attorney said, "Essentially the court holds that we did not abuse the bankruptcy filing, just that we should have filed differently." He also noted that only a minimal amount of money had been collected.

== Boston trials ==
=== Trial of Frankhouser ===
United States District Judge Robert Keeton presided in Boston. Jury selection was completed in September 1987. Before the trial could begin, Keeton granted a motion to sever the case of Roy Frankhouser, whose case was tried first in front of a different jury. Frankhouser had been an informant for the ATF and other law enforcement agencies, in addition to being a neo-Nazi and a former Pennsylvania Ku Klux Klan grand dragon. Frankhouser became a security consultant for LaRouche after convincing him that he was actively connected to U.S. intelligence agencies.

In U.S. v. Frankhauser, Frankhouser testified that he and LaRouche security employee Forrest Lee Fick had invented a connection to the CIA in order to justify his $700 a week salary. They persuaded a friend to play a former top CIA official ("Mr. Ed") in meetings with LaRouche associates who, according to LaRouche group lawyers, came to believe that they had a direct line of communication to the White House and Kremlin through Mr. Ed and—as "a national resource in security matters"—were immune from prosecution. When LaRouche found out about the grand jury investigation, he reportedly told Frankhouser to get the CIA to quash it. Frankhouser told LaRouche that the CIA wanted him to destroy evidence and hide witnesses. Frankhouser claimed that on another occasion LaRouche sent him to Boston to check on the grand jury investigation. Instead of going to Boston he went to a Star Trek convention in Scranton, Pennsylvania, and called to warn LaRouche that the FBI had wiretapped his phones. LaRouche was called as a defense witness in Frankhouser's trial but he refused to testify, exercising his Fifth Amendment right to avoid self-incrimination.

Frankhouser was found guilty of obstruction of the federal investigation into credit-card fraud. He was sentenced to three years and a $50,000 fine. After his conviction, he was granted immunity against further prosecution and compelled to testify against LaRouche in the Boston trial. Frankhouser appealed his conviction on April 3, 1989, arguing that his case should not have been severed from the main case, that his counsel had inadequate time to prepare, and that he was not provided with allegedly exculpatory evidence. The appeal was rejected in July.

=== Trial of LaRouche, et al. ===
The trial of LaRouche and his six co-defendants, U.S. v. LaRouche Campaign, began on December 17, 1987, with the jury that had been picked in September, before the Frankhouser trial. The 12 defense lawyers made 400 pretrial motions.

The prosecution argued that pressure to fill fund raising quotas had led to 2,000 instances of credit card fraud, and that organization members had sought to obstruct the investigation. The defense presented the case that the prosecution was the culmination of a 20-year campaign of harassment by the FBI and CIA, and that the prosecution was acting on the orders of the CIA when they destroyed evidence and hid witnesses.

During the trial, a search of the personal files of Oliver North was ordered by Judge Keeton to look for evidence that North had led an effort to harass and infiltrate the LaRouche movement, causing an additional delay in the trial. The search produced a May 1986 telex from Iran-Contra defendant General Richard Secord to North, discussing the gathering of information against LaRouche. After this memo surfaced, Judge Keeton ordered a search of Vice President George Bush's office for documents relating to LaRouche. Another delay came when the trial was halted to give time for the FBI to search their files for exculpatory documents. The trial was delayed again when federal agents seized LaRouche properties as part of the involuntary bankruptcy procedure in 1988.

Originally expected to last from three to six months, the trial stretched out much longer. One local reporter called the Boston trial a "long, complex and costly multidefendant extravaganza". After several jurors asked to be excused due to the length of the trial, the defense refused to proceed with fewer than 12 jurors, forcing the judge to declare a mistrial on May 4, 1988. According to one of the jurors, all defendants, including LaRouche, would have been found not guilty. He told a reporter "it seemed some of the government's people caused the problem", and that people working on behalf of the government "may have been involved in some of this fraud to discredit the campaign." At the time of the mistrial, a spokesperson said that the Constitutional Defense Fund, a LaRouche organization, had spent over $2 million on legal and administrative expenses. Defense attorneys said they would appeal if the government sought a new trial.

A retrial in Boston was scheduled for January 3, 1989, but the charges were dismissed after the Alexandria convictions; this was over the objections of the LaRouche lawyers who said they were seeking vindication. The Assistant U.S. Attorney who handled both the Boston and Alexandria cases said after the dismissal, "It was the Boston prosecuting effort which led to the evidence which allowed the indictment and convictions in Alexandria, and I think justice was served by the substantial sentences received."

Throughout the trial, three of the indicted individuals were fugitives: Michael Gelber, Charles Park, and Richard Sanders. According to Roy Frankhouser, they had been sent to Europe. They surrendered to the court in 1990 and were sentenced by Judge Keeton to one year each for obstructing the investigation.

=== Related appeals ===
On July 3, 1986, the First Circuit Court of Appeals upheld the contempt of court fines from the Boston grand jury. That decision was appealed to the U.S. Supreme Court, which let it stand. The First Circuit Court heard an appeal on September 11, 1987, alleging abuse of the grand jury and denied it six days later. On November 3, 1987, six organizations affiliated with LaRouche argued that their documents were seized improperly during the October 1986 search. The court denied the appeal the following January. Jeffrey Steinberg said on December 11, 1987, that 100 notebooks compiled by himself and his wife should not have been included in the grand jury subpoena or the search. He lost that appeal the following January. The court heard an appeal from NBC on January 5, 1988, over a lower court subpoena of NBC outtakes of a videotaped interview with a witness, Forrest Lee Fick. The lower court ruled the subpoenaed outtakes were to be placed under seal and subject to in camera review only, giving the court discretion whether to release any portion to the defendants. LaRouche had asserted the outtakes could be used to impeach Fick's testimony. The court affirmed the lower court's ruling in March.

Following the mistrial in Boston, the prosecution moved to schedule a new trial. LaRouche and the other defendants appealed that effort on October 5, 1988, saying that a new trial would create double jeopardy. The appeal was denied four months later. The contempt of court fines were appealed again on January 9, 1989, and affirmed again on March 29. Following the convictions in the Alexandria court, prosecutors moved to dismiss the charges from the Boston court, canceling the retrial. The LaRouche lawyers appealed that decision on March 13, 1989, arguing that they needed the trial to exonerate LaRouche.

== Alexandria trial ==
Judge Albert V. Bryan Jr. presided over U.S. v. LaRouche in the U.S. District Court for the Eastern District of Virginia, where LaRouche resided. That court was known as a "rocket docket" for its speed in disposing of cases. LaRouche and six associates were indicted on October 14, 1988, on charges of mail fraud and conspiracy to commit mail fraud. Trial was scheduled for six weeks after the indictment. Defense lawyers made an unusual appeal asking for a delay, which was rejected.

Judge Bryan granted a prosecution motion in limine, ruling that the defense would not be permitted to discuss, or even allude to, the fact that the indebted entities had been placed in involuntary bankruptcy. It also excluded claims of vindictive prosecution and political harassment by the government. Bryan wrote, "the court will not allow a delving into any details of alleged infiltration ... for the reason that ... this would divert the jury from the issues raised in the indictment."

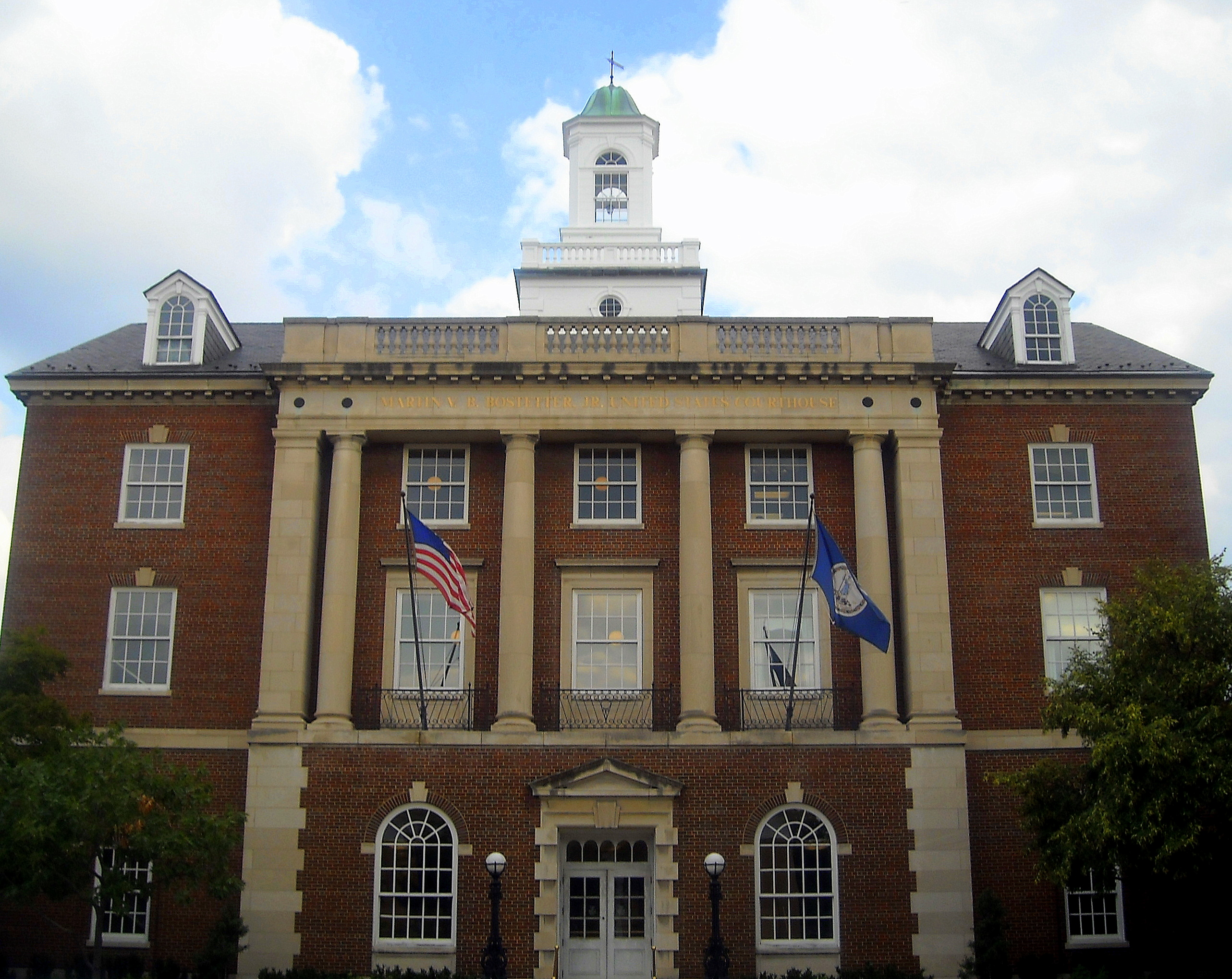
Federal courthouse in Alexandria, Virginia

The prosecution, led by Assistant U.S. Attorney Kent Robinson, presented evidence that LaRouche and his staff solicited US$34 million in loans since 1983 with false assurances to potential lenders and showed "reckless disregard for the truth". In his opening statement to the trial, Robinson said, "Members of the jury, this case is about money. It's about how the defendants got money, and to a lesser extent, what they did with that money when they got it ... The defendants, all seven of them, are charged in engaging in a scheme to defraud. That is, to obtain those loans by making false promises, false pretences, saying things to potential lenders which they knew weren't true."

The most important evidence was the testimony of lenders, many of them elderly retirees, who had loaned a total of $661,300 to help LaRouche fight the "war on drugs" but only received $10,000 in repayment. One of the prosecutors, John Markham, said those loans represented "just a very small portion of unrepaid borrowing". Other testimony asserted that, as of 1987, half of the $4 million borrowed by the 1984 presidential campaign was unpaid, and that only $5 million had been repaid out of $30 million in non-campaign loans. LaRouche supporters claim the unrepaid amount was $294,000 but, according to testimony at trial, the amount owed by 1987 topped $25 million.

Several witnesses were LaRouche followers who testified under immunity from prosecution. A former fundraiser testified that he was told, "No matter what the person you are talking to says, get the money. [...] If you are talking to an unemployed worker who says he has got to feed ... a dozen children, forget it. Get the money. Most of these people are immoral anyway. This is the most moral thing they have ever done is to give you money."

None of the defendants testified. Outside of court, LaRouche denied all the charges, calling them "an all-out frame-up by a state and federal task force," and said that the federal government was trying to kill him. "The purpose of this frame-up is not to send me to prison. It's to kill me," LaRouche said. "In prison it's fairly easy to kill me ... If this sentence goes through, I'm dead."

=== Income tax ===
One of the charges against LaRouche was that he had conspired to avoid paying income tax, not having filed a return in ten years. LaRouche claimed to have had no income. LaRouche lived on a 172-acre (700,000 m^{2}) estate near Leesburg, Virginia, with a pond and horse ring. It was purchased for his use by Oklahoma oilman David Nick Anderson for $1.3 million, with LaRouche organizations paying rent to cover the $9,605 mortgage. LaRouche had named the property, otherwise known as Ellwood, "Ibykus Farm" after a work by Friedrich Schiller. His wife, Helga LaRouche, is reported to have overseen hundreds of thousands of dollars in renovations to the property. In all, the LaRouche group spent over US$4 million on Virginia real estate during this period, according to trial testimony. The LaRouche defense argued that Ibykus Farm was a "safehouse" needed for the security of LaRouche and others. The government argued that security expenditures were "misplaced priorities."

In 1985, a judge in a separate case had described LaRouche's testimony about being almost penniless as "completely lacking in credibility". In 1986, in the same case, LaRouche said that he did not know who had paid the rent on the estate, or for his food, lodging, clothing, transportation, bodyguards, or lawyers since 1973. The judge fined him for failing to answer.

=== Conviction and imprisonment ===
On December 16, 1988, LaRouche was convicted of conspiracy to commit mail fraud involving more than $30 million in defaulted loans; 11 counts of actual mail fraud involving $294,000 in defaulted loans; and one count of conspiring to defraud the U.S. Internal Revenue Service. The judge said that the claim of a vendetta was "arrant nonsense", and that, "the idea that this organization is a sufficient threat to anything that would warrant the government bringing a prosecution to silence them just defies human experience." Jury foreman Buster Horton told The Washington Post that it was the failure of LaRouche aides to repay loans which swayed the jury in the Virginia case. He said that the jury "all agreed [LaRouche] was not on trial for his political beliefs. We did not convict him for that. He was convicted for those 13 counts he was on trial for."

As part of the trial in Alexandria, six of LaRouche's associates were also found guilty. His chief fund-raiser, William Wertz, was convicted on ten mail fraud counts. LaRouche's legal adviser and treasurer, Edward Spannaus, along with fund raising operatives Dennis Small, Paul Greenberg, Michael Billington, and Joyce Rubinstein, were convicted of conspiracy to commit mail fraud. Wertz and Spannaus were sentenced to five years imprisonment each, with Spannaus serving a total of two and a half years until his release from custody. Both were fined $1,000. The others received three-year terms and various fines.

While in prison LaRouche released claims that he was tortured as part of an assassination attempt. LaRouche ran two political campaigns from prison: for Virginia's 10th Congressional District in 1990 and for U.S. President in 1992. One of his cellmates during his incarceration at the Federal Medical Center, Rochester in Minnesota was televangelist Jim Bakker. Bakker later devoted a chapter of his book, I Was Wrong, to his experience with LaRouche. Bakker described his astonishment at LaRouche's detailed knowledge of the Bible. According to Bakker, LaRouche received a daily briefing each morning by phone, often in German, and on more than one occasion LaRouche had information days before it was reported on the network news. Bakker also wrote that his cellmate was convinced that their cell was bugged. In Bakker's view, "to say LaRouche was a little paranoid would be like saying that the Titanic had a little leak." LaRouche also befriended Richard Miller, a former FBI agent and fellow inmate who was imprisoned on espionage charges. LaRouche was paroled in 1994 after serving five years of the 15-year sentence, the normal schedule for parole at that time. LaRouche commented later that "... in effect, George H. W. Bush put me in the jug, and Bill Clinton got me out".

=== Appeal of convictions ===
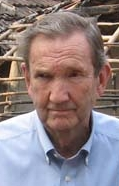
Ramsey Clark in 2007.

The defendants in the Alexandria trial appealed their convictions to Fourth Circuit Court of Appeals on October 6, 1989. Former U.S. Attorney General Ramsey Clark joined the defense team, which contended that there were six faults in the trial. In the words of the Circuit Court's opinion, the alleged errors were:

1. The district court erred in denying their motion for a continuance of the trial date.
2. The district court erroneously denied their discovery request for exculpatory material.
3. The district court made numerous evidentiary rulings, in limine and at trial, that unconstitutionally restricted their ability to defend against the charges.
4. The trial judge failed to conduct a voir dire sufficient to impanel an unbiased jury and improperly failed to excuse several jurors for cause.
5. The mail fraud counts were improperly joined with the tax conspiracy count.
6. The sentence imposed on LaRouche was excessive.
7. The district court erroneously instructed the jury on the tax count.
8. The district court erred in allowing the introduction of illegally seized evidence.

Seventeen amicus curiae ("friend of the court") briefs were filed in the appeal. One, by Albert Bleckmann, director of the Institute for Public Law and Political Sciences at the University of Münster, objected to the lack of voir dire, the exclusion of evidence under the motion in limine, the fact that the government did not approach LaRouche about his tax situation before indicting him for tax violations, and concerns about double jeopardy because of the nearly identical charges in the Boston and Alexandria trials. A brief by a French lawyer said that, "a crime of thought seems to have been camouflaged as a common law crime." Notable submitters of amicus briefs included: James Robert Mann, Charles E. Rice, Jay Alan Sekulow and George P. Monaghan.

The three-judge panel reviewed and rejected each item, affirming the defendants' convictions and sentences unanimously on January 22, 1990. Five months later the U.S. Supreme Court declined to review the case.

== State trials ==
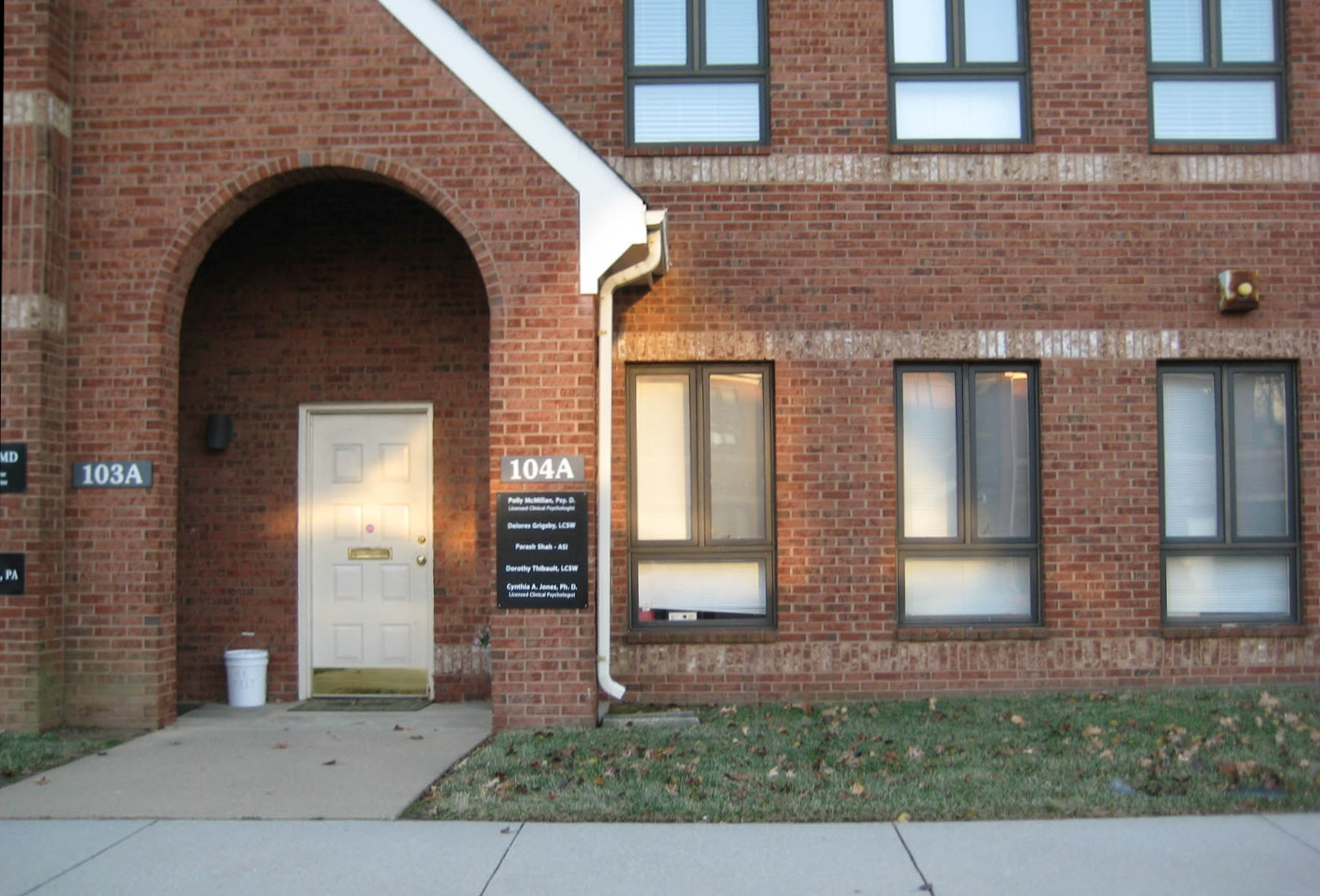
Law offices of the LaRouche movement during the state trials (photographed in 2008).

The Attorney General of Virginia, Mary Sue Terry, prosecuted eight LaRouche organizations on charges of securities fraud relating to $30 million in loans. The first trials were in Leesburg, but later trials moved to the larger city of Roanoke. In order for the prosecutions to proceed, a decision by the State Corporation Commission (SCC) was needed verifying that the loans solicited by LaRouche organizations were securities. Attorneys for the LaRouche organizations argued that a prohibition on raising funds through loans would violate their First Amendment rights. The SCC rejected that argument and decided, on March 4, 1987, that the promissory notes were securities. It ordered six LaRouche organizations—Fusion Energy Foundation Inc., Caucus Distributors Inc., Publication and General Management Inc., Campaigner Publications Inc., EIR News Service Inc. and Publication Equities Inc.—to stop their sale. Five other states had already issued injunctions, and 14 states eventually followed. At least one injunction, by the State of Minnesota against Independent Democrats for LaRouche, was appealed to the U.S. Supreme Court, which confirmed the lower court ruling.

Six of LaRouche's associates were convicted and two pleaded guilty. Rochelle Ascher, a fundraiser, was sentenced in Leesburg to 86 years (reduced to 10 years) for six charges of fraudulently selling securities and one count each of selling an unregistered security with intent to defraud, selling a security by an unregistered agent with intent to defraud, and conspiracy to commit security fraud. In two Roanoke trials, four other associates were found guilty of securities fraud charges: Donald Phau, Lawrence Hecht, Paul Gallagher and Anita Gallagher. Richard Welsh and Martha M. Quinde pleaded guilty and received 12 month and one month terms, respectively.

Michael Billington was charged in a Roanoke court with having knowingly solicited 131 loans that would never be repaid from 85 people, totaling $1.24 million. Represented by a court-appointed lawyer, he rejected a plea bargain that would have limited his prison sentence to the three years he had already served in the federal case. The lawyer, Brian Gettings, doubted Billington's competence and told the court that he believed LaRouche was making the decisions in the case rather than his client. The court ordered two psychiatric tests. The first physician deemed him competent. Billington refused to cooperate with a second examination that was to be conducted by an expert on cults. Billington sought to fire Gettings, who had already tried to quit over competency question, but the judge refused to permit Billington to substitute a different attorney. A LaRouche spokesman said that Billington was prepared for trial. Billington was convicted on nine counts of "conspiracy to fail to register as a securities broker". Under Virginia's court system, the jury determines prison terms although a judge may override the jury's recommendation. The jury in this case recommended 77 years (out of a possible 90); the judge refused to lower it because Billington continued to insist upon his innocence (which the judge deemed lack of remorse) and because he had warned that he would accept the jury recommendation if Billington requested a jury trial. Billington served a total of ten years in prison before being released on parole. The lead prosecutor said the case involved "willful and massive fraud that has caused a lot of people to suffer".

A trial in New York state courts on charges of scheming to defraud resulted in the conviction of Robert Primack, Marielle Kronberg and Lynne Speed.

== Reactions from LaRouche and supporters ==
"My imprisonment is the American Dreyfus case", LaRouche said in a January 1989 interview from prison. The prosecutor denied claims of a conspiracy, describing the theory as an "Orwellian fantasy ... that we are hiding some supersecret spy plot which, if exposed, would exonerate them". LaRouche supporters insisted that LaRouche was jailed, not for any violation of the law, but for his beliefs.

LaRouche also alleged systematic government misconduct:

The record shows, that for nearly thirty years, elements of the U.S. Department of Justice have been engaged in world-wide political targeting of me and my associates. This includes early 1970s operations run in conjunction with Secretary of State Henry A. Kissinger's U.S. State Department. During the last ten years or so of that period, some U.S. officials, and others, have challenged the relevant agencies with some of the evidence which shows, that those prosecutions and correlated harassment of me and my associates, had been clearly fraudulent, politically motivated targeting.

LaRouche and his lawyers asserted that the Anti-Defamation League (ADL) sought to destroy his organization, and that the prosecution was the result of a conspiracy between the ADL, the government and the media. This claim stemmed from a series of meetings that LaRouche publications refer to as the John Train "Salon". The New York Times reported, in its obituary for Train, that "he convened meetings at his home for journalists, law enforcement agents and others in government to raise awareness about research he had done into Mr. LaRouche."

Friedrich August Freiherr von der Heydte, a professor of constitutional and international law at the University of Mainz in Germany, compared the LaRouche trial to the Dreyfus affair, which he called "a classical example of a political trial". He wrote, "Just as LaRouche was, the French Capt. Alfred Dreyfus was deprived by the structure of the trial procedures, of any opportunity to prove his innocence, and facts critical for his defense were excluded from the trial."

On November 8, 1991, Angelo Vidal d'Almeida Ribeiro, the Special Rapporteur for the United Nations Commission on Human Rights, filed a request to the U.S. Government based on a complaint that had been filed concerning the LaRouche case. The U.S. government responded by saying that LaRouche had been given due process under the laws of the United States. The U.N. Commission took no further action.

In testimony submitted to the Senate Judiciary Committee on July 13, 1998, the LaRouche-affiliated Schiller Institute claimed that "[t]he inability to repay lenders and other crediters [sic] was the consequence of an unprecedented involuntary bankruptcy proceeding initiated by the Justice Department against those companies in 1987, initiated in an ex parte, in camera proceeding".

In 2000, Adrian Bennett, a former Australian member of parliament and founder of the LaRouchite Curtin Labor Alliance, stated that LaRouche had been framed by the "global oligarchy", and said the convictions represented "a badge of honor, a testament to the unshakable courage and commitment of LaRouche and his associates".

== Exoneration attempts ==
Ramsey Clark wrote a letter in 1995 to then-Attorney General Janet Reno in which he said that the case involved "a broader range of deliberate and systematic misconduct and abuse of power over a longer period of time in an effort to destroy a political movement and leader, than any other federal prosecution in my time or to my knowledge". He asserted that, "The government, ex parte, sought and received an order effectively closing the doors of these publishing businesses, all of which were involved in First Amendment activities, effectively preventing the further repayment of their debts." He called the convictions "a tragic miscarriage of justice which at this time can only be corrected by an objective review and courageous action by the Department of Justice". The LaRouche movement organized two panels to review the cases: the Curtis Clark Commission, and the Mann-Chestnut Commission.

On September 18, 1996, a full-page advertisement appeared in the New Federalist, a LaRouche publication, as well as The Washington Post and Roll Call. Entitled "Officials Call for LaRouche's Exoneration", its signatories included Arturo Frondizi, former President of Argentina; figures from the 1960s American Civil Rights Movement such as Amelia Boynton Robinson (a leader of the Larouche-affiliated Schiller Institute), James Bevel (a Larouche movement participant) and Rosa Parks; former Minnesota Senator and Democratic Presidential Candidate Eugene McCarthy; Mervyn M. Dymally, who chaired the Congressional Black Caucus; and artists such as classical vocalist William Warfield and violinist Norbert Brainin, former 1st Violin of the Amadeus Quartet.

== Later developments ==
In 2009, Molly Kronberg, widow of Kenneth Kronberg, sued LaRouche in federal court for the Eastern District of Virginia, in Alexandria, alleging that he and his associates libelled and harassed her on account of her compelled testimony in the 1988 case which led to his conviction. LaRouche alleges that Kronberg perjured herself and colluded with the prosecutors to frame him in order to cover up a bad check issued in 1979 by her from a New Benjamin Franklin House Publishing Company account for royalties owed him. One of the prosecutors in the 1988 case, John Markham, is representing Kronberg in the suit.

== United States court of appeals ==
- In Re Grand Jury Proceedings.appeal of Campaigner Publications, Inc., et al., 795 F.2d 226 (1st Cir. July 3, 1986).
- U.S. v. Larouche Campaign, 829 F.2d 250 (1st Cir. September 17, 1987).
- Fusion Energy Foundation v. Terry, 836 F.2d 1342 (4th Cir. January 7, 1988).
- In Re Jeffrey Steinberg, 837 F.2d 527 (1st Cir. January 22, 1988).
- U.S. v. LaRouche Campaign, appeal of National Broadcasting Company, Inc, 841 F.2d 1176 (1st Cir. March 9, 1988).
- U.S. v. LaRouche Campaign, 866 F.2d 512 (1st Cir. January 31, 1989).
- In Re Grand Jury Proceedings.appeal of Caucus Distributors, Inc., et al., 871 F.2d 156 (1st Cir. May 30, 1989).
- U.S. v. Frankhauser, 878 F.2d 1571 (4th Cir. July 4, 1989). [Note: Court records spell the name "Frankhauser" while most other sources spell it "Frankhouser".]
- U.S. v. LaRouche, 896 F.2d 815 (4th Cir. January 22, 1990).
- U.S. v. LaRouche, 4 F.3d 987 (4th Cir. September 13, 1993).
- Welsh v. Holt, 78 F.3d 580 (4th Cir. February 28, 1996).
