= Richard Gooch =

Richard Gooch may refer to:

- Sir (Richard) John Sherlock Gooch, 12th Baronet (1930–1999) of the Gooch baronets
- Richard Frank Sherlock Gooch, on the List of Lady & Gentleman Ushers (1964–1969)
- Richard Gooch, one of the candidates of the 2001 Australian federal election
