= Candidates of the 2001 Australian federal election =

This article provides information on candidates who stood for the 2001 Australian federal election. The election was held on 10 November 2001.

== Redistributions and seat changes ==
- Redistributions occurred in New South Wales, Western Australia and the Northern Territory.
  - In New South Wales, the Liberal-held seats of Macarthur and Parramatta became notionally Labor, while the Labor-held seat of Paterson became notionally Liberal.
  - In Western Australia, the notionally Labor seat of Hasluck was created.
  - The division of Northern Territory was split into the notionally Labor seat of Lingiari and the notionally CLP seat of Solomon. The sitting member, Warren Snowdon (Labor), contested Lingiari.

== Retiring Members and Senators ==
=== Labor ===
- Colin Hollis MP (Throsby, NSW)
- Allan Morris MP (Newcastle, NSW)
- Neil O'Keefe MP (Burke, Vic)
- Senator Barney Cooney (Vic)
- Senator Rosemary Crowley (SA)
- Senator Jim McKiernan (WA)
- Senator Sue West (NSW)

=== Liberal ===
- John Fahey MP (Macarthur, NSW)
- Lou Lieberman MP (Indi, Vic)
- Peter Reith MP (Flinders, Vic)
- Michael Ronaldson MP (Ballarat, Vic)
- Kathy Sullivan MP (Moncrieff, Qld)
- Andrew Thomson MP (Wentworth, NSW)
- Michael Wooldridge MP (Casey, Vic)
- Senator Jocelyn Newman (Tas)

=== National ===
- Tim Fischer MP (Farrer, NSW)
- Tony Lawler MP (Parkes, NSW)
- Garry Nehl MP (Cowper, NSW)

=== Country Liberal ===
- Senator Grant Tambling (NT)

== House of Representatives ==
Sitting members at the time of the election are shown in bold text. Successful candidates are highlighted in the relevant colour. Where there is possible confusion, an asterisk (*) is also used.

=== Australian Capital Territory ===
Electorate	Held by	Labor	Liberal	Democrats	Greens	One Nation	Other
Canberra	Labor	**Annette Ellis**	Belinda Barnier	Aaron Matthews	Stephanie Koorey	Barry Cox	John Miller (CDP)
Fraser	Labor	**Bob McMullan**	Martin Dunn	Fleur Wimborne	Ben O'Callaghan	Paul Kemp	Caroline O'Sullivan (CDP); James Vassilopoulos (Ind)

=== New South Wales ===
Electorate	Held by	Labor	Coalition	Democrats	Greens	One Nation	Other
Banks	Labor	**Daryl Melham**	Marcus Watzlaff (Lib)	Stephen Cole	David Wilcox	Lynn Abrahams	Sam Baissari (CDP); Nazim Hannoun (Ind); Lynne Murphy (Unity); Ken O'Leary (AAFI)
Barton	Labor	**Robert McClelland**	Jan Brennan (Lib)	Michele Adair	Chris Harris	David Rydstrand	David Barker (CDP); John Lau (Unity)
Bennelong	Liberal	Nicole Campbell	**John Howard** (Lib)	Peter Goldfinch	Jimmy Shaw	Robert Webeck	John Dawson (Ind); Bruce Harkness (NGST); May Law (Unity); Peter Marsh (NCPP); Noel Plumb (SAS)
Berowra	Liberal	Richard Slater	**Philip Ruddock** (Lib)	Philip Sparks	Maureen Gale	Harry Ball	Daniel Choi (Unity); P J Gallagher (NGST); Owen Nannelli (CDP)
Blaxland	Labor	**Michael Hatton**	Les Osmond (Lib)	Colin McDermott	Sonya McKay	Bob Vinnicombe	Munther Anny (Ind); Dario Hawat (Unity); Janne Peterson (CDP); Peter Sayegh (Ind)
Bradfield	Liberal	Kathie Blunt	**Brendan Nelson** (Lib)	Peter Byrne	David Bell	John Webeck	Witold Wiszniewski (CDP)
Calare	Independent	Kath Knowles	Dave Shearing (Nat)	Don Marshall	Ian Watts	Terry Nixon	**Peter Andren*** (Ind); David Simpson (CEC)
Charlton	Labor	**Kelly Hoare**	Lindsay Paterson (Lib)	Joshua Bell	David Blyth	Bob Johnson	Jim Kendall (CDP); John Thorpe (Unity)
Chifley	Labor	**Roger Price**	Costa Asarloglou (Lib)	S J Clack	David Cunningham	Joe Damjanovic	Barbie Bates (SAS); Lindsey Butler (AAFI); Wayne Hyland (Ind); Joseph Wyness (CDP)
Cook	Liberal	Peri Young	**Bruce Baird** (Lib)	Alison Bailey	Cathy Peters-Power	Andy Frew	Peter James (AAFI); Patricia Poulos (Ind); Malcolm Smith (CDP); Graeme Strang (Ind)
Cowper	National	Jenny Bonfield	Luke Hartsuyker* (Nat); Phillip Neuss (Lib)	Michael Fenton	Jillian Cranny	Allan Stokes	Bruce Korn (CDP); John Maguire (LEF); Paul van Bladel (Ind); John Willey (Ind)
Cunningham	Labor	**Stephen Martin**	Jeremy Fields (Lib)	Michael Newman	Carol Berry	John Curtis	Trevor Mott (Ind); J Edwin Pink (NGST); Paul Skinner (CDP)
Dobell	Labor	**Michael Lee**	Ken Ticehurst (Lib)	Carolyn Hastie	Samantha Ker	Ron Falconer	Luke Hennig (CDP)
Eden-Monaro	Liberal	Steve Whan	**Gary Nairn** (Lib)	Linda Chapman	Rosemary Beaumont	Barry Bridges	Peter Cochran (Ind); Frank Phillips (CDP); Matthew Swift (Ind); Steve Urquhart (Ind); Peter Vlug (NCPP)
Farrer	National	Frank Millen	Bill Bott (Nat); Sussan Ley* (Lib)	Brett Paterson	Chris Sobey	Max Wilkinson	David Corbett (Ind); Andrew Gibson (Ind); Keith Kreutzberger (Ind); Sue Taylor (Ind); Stuart Watson (Ind); Tom Weyrich (Ind)
Fowler	Labor	**Julia Irwin**	Glenn Watson (Lib)	David Mendelssohn	Lee Grant	Oscar Rosso	Max Brazenall (AAFI); Steve Chung (Unity); Robin Gaskell (NGST); Hal Johnson (CEC); Manny Poularas (CDP)
Gilmore	Liberal	Peter Knott	**Joanna Gash** (Lib)	Michael Hayes	Jane Bange	Geoff Crocker	Jean McClung (CEC); Paul McLeod (Unity); Steve Ryan (CDP)
Grayndler	Labor	**Anthony Albanese**	Brett Kenworthy (Lib)	Matthew Baird	Sylvia Hale	Kane O'Connor	Chris Herden (CDP); Sue Johnson (Ind); Guang Hua Wan (Unity)
Greenway	Labor	**Frank Mossfield**	Rick Holder (Lib)	Joseph Francis	Tony Vlatko	Tony Pettitt	Bob Bawden (CDP); Ted Sherwood (AAFI); Amarjit Singh Tanda (Ind)
Gwydir	National	Anne Murnain	**John Anderson** (Nat)	Ken Graham	Neil Strachan	Colin Rogers	Gary Edwards (Ind); Bruce Haigh (Ind); Bevan O'Regan (Ind); Harry Weber (LEF); Richard Witten (CEC)
Hughes	Liberal	Christine Hawkins	**Danna Vale** (Lib)	Bruce van de Weg	Simon Heemstra	Susan Oz	William Ryan (CDP)
Hume	Liberal	Jan Merriman	**Alby Schultz** (Lib)	James Roxburgh	Kevin Watchirs	Charlie Prell	
Hunter	Labor	**Joel Fitzgibbon**	Rob Macaulay (Nat)	Rod Bennison	Larry O'Brien	Bill Fox	Ann Lawler (CEC)
Kingsford Smith	Labor	**Laurie Brereton**	Bruce Notley-Smith (Lib)	Peter Zakrzewski	Arthur Hurwitz	Jill Brown	Marina Carman (Ind)
Lindsay	Liberal	David Bradbury	**Jackie Kelly** (Lib)	Geraldine Waters	Lesley Edwards	Bill Nixon	Geoff Brown (SAS); Anthony Courtney (Ind); Jean Eykamp (NGST); Steve Lindsay-Henderson (Ind); Graham Mitchell (Ind); John Phillips (CDP); Stephen Walker (NCPP)
Lowe	Labor	**John Murphy**	David Doust (Lib)	Anna Garrett	Mersina Soulos	Harry Krumins	Max Lane (Ind); Ernest Wong (Unity)
Lyne	National	Pat Stevens	**Mark Vaile** (Nat)	Philip Jirman	Siobhan Isherwood	Lynn Stanfield	Graeme Muldoon (CEC); Dane Sara (Ind)
Macarthur	Labor	Meg Oates	Pat Farmer (Lib)	Jasmine Lantry	Geraldine Hunt	Len Watkins	Gregory Knowles (Ind); Eric Sanders (NCPP); Elwyn Sheppard (CDP)
Mackellar	Liberal	Ben Carpentier	**Bronwyn Bishop** (Lib)	Vicki Dimond	Andrea Pape	Peter Cuthbertson	George May (Ind); Tom Moody (AAFI)
Macquarie	Liberal	Adam Searle	**Kerry Bartlett** (Lib)	Les Majoros	Leigh Williams	Wayne Buckley	Brian Grigg (CDP); Robert Warren (SAS)
Mitchell	Liberal	John McShane	**Alan Cadman** (Lib)	David Baggs	Cindy Taylor	Dale Eder	Stephen Burke (Ind); Ken Gregory (CDP); David Mudgee (AAFI)
New England	National	Annette McCarthy	**Stuart St. Clair** (Nat)	Chris Reardon	Michelle Reiner	Kayleen Bounds	Tony Windsor (Ind)
Newcastle	Labor	Sharon Grierson	David Williams (Lib)	Mary Kavanagh	John Sutton	Barrie Lawn	Elaine Battersby (CDP); Harry Criticos (Ind); Erin Killion-DelCastillo (Ind); Harry Williams (PLP)
North Sydney	Liberal	Fran Teirney	**Joe Hockey** (Lib)	Bryan McGuire	Mike Steel		Brian Lam (Unity); Colin Ward (CDP)
Page	National	Terry Flanagan	**Ian Causley** (Nat)	Allan Jeffreys	John Corkill	Marie Mathew	Doug Behn (Ind); Judy Canales (HEMP); Tom Cooper (Ind); Arthur Felsch (CDP); Angela Griffiths (CEC); Edda Lampis (Ind); Kathryn Pollard-O'Hara (Ind)
Parkes	National	Joe Knagge	John Cobb (Nat)	Geoff Ward	Samantha Dunlop	Bob Redfern	
Parramatta	Liberal	David Borger	**Ross Cameron** (Lib)	Anthony Clark	Felicity George	John Satchwell	Dee Jonsson (CDP); Somchai Tongsumrith (Unity); Will Watson (NCPP)
Paterson	Liberal	**Bob Horne**	Bob Baldwin* (Lib); Ian Shaw (Nat)	Sharon Davies	Aina Ranke	Paul Cary	Paul Hennelly (FP); Tony King (CEC)
Prospect	Labor	**Janice Crosio**	Gareth Perkins (Lib)	Thomas Peacock	Rebecca Filipczyk	John Hutchinson	Lewis Haroon (CDP); Garry Oates (AAFI); Kek Tai (Unity)
Reid	Labor	**Laurie Ferguson**	Irfan Yusuf (Lib)	Adrian Archer	Steve Maxwell	Shane O'Connor	Habib Chamas (Unity); Uwe Ledermann (CDP); Lisa Macdonald (Ind)
Richmond	National	Jenny McAllister	**Larry Anthony** (Nat)	Casey Balk	Jan Barham	Dell Rolfe	Nicolas Faulkner (Ind); Dean Jefferys (HEMP); Julie Nathan (Ind); John Penhaligon (Ind); Alexander Peniazev (NCPP); Rob Simpson (Ind)
Riverina	National	Andrew Albiston	**Kay Hull** (Nat)	Rex Graham	Catherine Moore	Neil Turner	Russel Dancey (CDP); Dennis Richter (Ind)
Robertson	Liberal	Trish Moran	**Jim Lloyd** (Lib)	Harry Boyle	Stephen Lacey	Errol Baker	Kaijin Kenisciehad (Ind); Christine Hennig (CDP); James Laing-Peach (Ind); Ken Martin (CEC); Alasdair Munn (Ind); Barry Phillips (PLP); Kevin Wills (Ind)
Shortland	Labor	**Jill Hall**	Brian Perrem (Lib)	Steven Adams	Joan Lambert	Iris Candlish	Peter Craig (Ind); Ron Gardnir (Ind)
Sydney	Labor	**Tanya Plibersek**	Jeff Pettett (Lib)	Sydney Hickman	Jamie Parker		
Throsby	Labor	Jennie George	Alan Akhurst (Lib)	Madeleine Roberts	Elsa Story	Ivan Prsa	Margaret Perrott (Ind)
Warringah	Liberal	Julie Heraghty	**Tony Abbott** (Lib)	Nina Burridge	Keelah Lam	David Kelly	Christine Ferguson (NGST); Peter Macdonald (Ind)
Watson	Labor	**Leo McLeay**	Arnold Plooy (Lib)	Kristin Griffiths	Dominic Fitzsimmons	Michelle Farrell	Ken Nam (Unity); Ronald Poulsen (Ind)
Wentworth	Liberal	Carolyn Neilson	Peter King (Lib)	Margaret Collings	Alison Lyssa	Aub Golden	Alan Jacobs (Unity)
Werriwa	Labor	**Mark Latham**	Paul Masina (Lib)	Glenda Blanch	Roger Barsony	P Kotarski	Greg Tan (CDP); John Uri (Unity); Janey Woodger (AAFI)

=== Northern Territory ===
Electorate	Held by	Labor	CLP	Democrats	Greens	One Nation	Other
Lingiari	Labor	**Warren Snowdon**	Ron Kelly	Linda Chellew	Rob Hoad	Wayne Norris	Wayne Wright (Ind)
Solomon	Country Liberal	Laurene Hull	Dave Tollner	Ted Dunstan	David Pollock	Mervyn Stewart	Maisie Austin (Ind); Maurie Ryan-Japarta (Ind)

=== Queensland ===
Electorate	Held by	Labor	Coalition	One Nation	Democrats	Greens	Other
Blair	Liberal	Wayne Wendt	**Cameron Thompson** (Lib)	Gary Turner	Neal McKenzie	Phil Kyson	Lindsay Cosgrove (CEC); Selwyn Johnston (Ind); Dan Ryan (Ind)
Bowman	Labor	**Con Sciacca**	Andrew Laming (Lib)	Barry Myatt	Chad Smith	Fay Smith	
Brisbane	Labor	**Arch Bevis**	Sue Ekert (Nat); Seb Monsour (Lib)	P R Jansen	Damian Dewar	Richard Nielsen	Ashley Lavelle (Ind)
Capricornia	Labor	**Kirsten Livermore**	John Lever (Nat); Lea Taylor (Lib)	Herb Clarke	Naomi Johns	Bob Muir	Ray Gillham (CEC); John Murphy (Ind); Peter Schuback (Ind)
Dawson	National	Cherry Feeney	**De-Anne Kelly** (Nat)	Rob Robinson	Karen Offield	Barry Jones	Andrew Ellul (Ind); Jan Pukallus (CEC)
Dickson	Labor	**Cheryl Kernot**	Peter Dutton (Lib)	Wayne Whitney	Shayne Turner	Paul Kramer	J F Barnes (Ind); Terry Hyland (Ind); Colin Kessels (Ind); Gary Kimlin (ORP)
Fadden	Liberal	Ray Merlehan	**David Jull** (Lib)	Chris Coyle	Neil Cotter	Julian Woolford	
Fairfax	Liberal	John Henderson	**Alex Somlyay** (Lib)	Jim Mackellar	Karen Jackson	Joy Ringrose	Shane Paulger (Ind)
Fisher	Liberal	Ray O'Donnell	**Peter Slipper** (Lib)	Bruce Tannock	Geoff Armstrong	Tony McLeod	Ros Hourigan (Ind)
Forde	Liberal	Val Smith	**Kay Elson** (Lib)	Alice Ngahooro	Alan Dickson	Rose Clyne	
Griffith	Labor	**Kevin Rudd**	Ann Graham (Nat); Ross Vasta (Lib)	Edmund McMahon	David Rendell	Rob Wilson	Joseph Rooke (Ind)
Groom	Liberal	Leeann King	**Ian Macfarlane*** (Lib); Barbara Wuersching (Nat)	David Hoy	Stephen Eyres	Michael Kane	Rob Berry (Ind)
Herbert	Liberal	Jenny Hill	**Peter Lindsay** (Lib)	Anthony Weil	Richard Hoolihan	Anne Goddard	Conway Bown (Ind)
Hinkler	National	Cheryl Dorron	**Paul Neville** (Nat)	Martin Janke	Lisa White	Theresa Bates	Peter Melville (Ind)
Kennedy	National	Alan Neilan	Mary Lyle (Nat)	Jerry Burnett	Jo Wall	Cherie Rivas	Judith Harris (CEC); **Bob Katter*** (Ind)
Leichhardt	Liberal	Matt Trezise	**Warren Entsch** (Lib)	Thomas East	Harold Salier	Jonathan Metcalfe	Rata Pugh (Ind)
Lilley	Labor	**Wayne Swan**	David Ross (Lib)	Pierre Bocquee	Rod McDonough	Sue Meehan	
Longman	Liberal	Stephen Beckett	**Mal Brough** (Lib)	Bert Bowden	Bronwyn Patrick	Eve Scopes	Brian Hallam (Ind); Leslie Hardwick (CEC)
Maranoa	National	David Bowden	**Bruce Scott** (Nat)	Mark McNichol	Rhonda Wilson	Noel Nemeth	Cindy Rolls (CEC)
McPherson	Liberal	Kellie Trigger	**Margaret May** (Lib)	Paul Lewis	Russell White	Inge Light	Ronald Bradley (Ind); Kevin Goodwin (Ind)
Moncrieff	Liberal	Victoria Chatterjee	Steven Ciobo* (Lib); Susie Douglas (Nat)	Lesley Millar	Kari Derrick	Dean Hepburn	Maxwell Aleckson (Ind); Maurie Carroll (Ind); Josephine Tobias (Ind)
Moreton	Liberal	Kathleen Brookes	**Gary Hardgrave** (Lib)	Barry Weedon	Tracy Comans	Lenore Taylor	Andrew Lamb (Ind)
Oxley	Labor	**Bernie Ripoll**	Kevin Parer (Lib)	Thomas Armstrong	Kate Kunzelmann	John McKeon	
Petrie	Liberal	Rosemary Hume	**Teresa Gambaro** (Lib)	Bill Black	Owen Griffiths	Kim Pantano	Ron Eaton (Ind)
Rankin	Labor	**Craig Emerson**	Paul Wood (Lib)	Mark Mackenzie	Darryl Dobson	Daniel Lloyd	
Ryan	Labor	**Leonie Short**	Stewart Gillies (Nat); Michael Johnson* (Lib)	John Drew	Jason Langenauer	Mike Stasse	Stephen Allen-Ankins (Ind); Clive Brazier (HEMP)
Wide Bay	National	Russ Tremlin	**Warren Truss** (Nat)	Jim Dwyer	Althea Smith	Paul Jansen	David Dalgleish (Ind); Maurice Hetherington (CEC); Tony Pitt (Ind); Graeme Wicks (Ind)

=== South Australia ===
Electorate	Held by	Labor	Liberal	Democrats	Greens	One Nation	Other
Adelaide	Liberal	Tim Stanley	**Trish Worth**	Sue Mann	Lynne Osborn	Lee Peacock	
Barker	Liberal	David Detchon	**Patrick Secker**	Louise Miller	Matt Rigney	Dona Wright	Liz Ballinger (Ind); Philip Cornish (Ind)
Bonython	Labor	**Martyn Evans**	Brenton Chomel	Mark Dennis	Lisa Blake	John Mahoney	Rita Hunt (NGST)
Boothby	Liberal	Jim Murphy	**Andrew Southcott**	Jo Pride	Michelle Drummond	Daniel Piechnick	Jack King (Ind); William Manfield (Ind); Paul Starling (Ind)
Grey	Liberal	Con O'Neill	**Barry Wakelin**	Gil Robertson	Felicity Martin	Sylvia Holland	
Hindmarsh	Liberal	Steve Georganas	**Chris Gallus**	Caroline Dowd	Deb Cashel	Peter Fitzpatrick	
Kingston	Labor	**David Cox**	Dean Hersey	Graham Pratt	Deborah Guildner	Charlie McCormack	Gordon Arandelovic (NGST)
Makin	Liberal	Julie Woodman	**Trish Draper**	Christine Posta	Allon Reeves	Rod Kowald	
Mayo	Liberal	Delia Brennan	**Alexander Downer**	John McLaren	Dave Clark	Mike Thomas	Howie Coombe (Ind); Bill Spragg (Ind)
Port Adelaide	Labor	**Rod Sawford**	Josh Krieg	Matilda Bawden	Brian Noone	Andrew Phillips	Michael Perth (Ind)
Sturt	Liberal	Lindsay Simmons	**Christopher Pyne**	Tim Farrow	Mark Cullen	Brian Richards	Neil Aitchison (Ind)
Wakefield	Liberal	Mark Rowbottom	**Neil Andrew**	Marcus Reseigh	Pam Kelly	David Dwyer	

=== Tasmania ===
Electorate	Held by	Labor	Liberal	Greens	Democrats	One Nation	Other
Bass	Labor	**Michelle O'Byrne**	Tony Benneworth	Kim Booth	Sancia Colgrave	Denis Collins	Margy Dockray (LFF); Ian Hardman (TFP); Caroline Larner (CEC)
Braddon	Labor	**Sid Sidebottom**	Alan Pattison	Clare Thompson	Craig Cooper	Steve Pickford	
Denison	Labor	**Duncan Kerr**	Tony Steven	Brenda Hampson	Penny Edwards		
Franklin	Labor	**Harry Quick**	Peter Hodgman	Patricia Bastick	Karen Manskey	Art Mulloy	
Lyons	Labor	**Dick Adams**	Geoff Page	Tim Morris	Sonia Anderson	Neil Batchelor	

=== Victoria ===
Electorate	Held by	Labor	Coalition	Democrats	Greens	Other
Aston	Liberal	Kieran Boland	**Chris Pearce** (Lib)	Ruth Kendall	Mick Kir	Ray Levick (CDP); Doug Mitchell (CEC)
Ballarat	Liberal	Catherine King	Charles Collins (Lib)	Danii Coric	Tony Kelly	John Blanchard (ON)
Batman	Labor	**Martin Ferguson**	John Davies (Lib)	Scott Kneebone	Alexandra Bhathal	Wayne Barwick (CEC); Jackie Lynch (Ind)
Bendigo	Labor	**Steve Gibbons**	Maurie Sharkey (Lib)	Helen Lilley	Bruce Rivendell	Phil Arnold (CDP); Ron Barrow (Ind); John Pasquarelli (Ind); Neil Smith (ON); Karel Zegers (Ind)
Bruce	Labor	**Alan Griffin**	Reg Steel (Lib)	Shaun Robyns	David Collis	
Burke	Labor	Brendan O'Connor	Chris Dawe (Lib)	Geoff Lutz	Marcus Ward	
Calwell	Labor	Maria Vamvakinou	Darren Buller (Lib)	Robert Livesay	Bee Barker	John Abbotto (NGST); Mohamed Bochi (Ind); D Dervish (Ind); **Andrew Theophanous** (Ind); Sleiman Yohanna (CEC)
Casey	Liberal	David McKenzie	Tony Smith (Lib)	Tom Joyce	Lorraine Leach	
Chisholm	Labor	**Anna Burke**	Ros Clowes (Lib)	James Bennett	Howard Tankey	John Murray (NGST)
Corangamite	Liberal	Michael Bjork-Billings	**Stewart McArthur** (Lib)	Robyn Hodge	Iain Lygo	Simon Arundell (Ind); Graham Hills (ON); Nigel Strauss (LFF)
Corio	Labor	**Gavan O'Connor**	Steve Malesic (Lib)	Erica Menheere-Thompson	Catherine Johnson	Cheryl Fairbrother (Ind); Tim Gooden (Ind); Gareth Hill (CEC); Herbert Tirkot (ON)
Deakin	Liberal	Helen Buckingham	**Phil Barresi** (Lib)	Nahum Ayliffe	Robyn Evans	
Dunkley	Liberal	Mark Conroy	**Bruce Billson** (Lib)	Ian Woodhouse	Henry Kelsall	Michael Cartwright (ON); Fletcher Davis (Ind)
Flinders	Liberal	Wayne Finch	Greg Hunt (Lib)	Richard Armstrong	David de Rango	Ashley Blade (Ind); Kevin Dowey (ON); Earle Wilson (Ind)
Gellibrand	Labor	**Nicola Roxon**	Christopher Tann (Lib)	Rachel Richards	Michele Finey	Jorge Jorquera (Ind)
Gippsland	National	Bill Bolitho	**Peter McGauran** (Nat)	Jo McCubbin	Chris Aitken	Ben Buckley (Ind); Phillip Evans (Ind); Michael Freshwater (ON); John Jago (Ind); Phillip Robinson (Ind); Marjorie Thorpe (Ind); Doug Treasure (Ind); Frank Williams (CEC)
Goldstein	Liberal	Rachel Powning	**David Kemp** (Lib)	Michaela Newell	Teresa Puszka	Kristin Stegley (Ind)
Higgins	Liberal	Katie Stephens	**Peter Costello** (Lib)	Katie Moss	Tania Giles	
Holt	Labor	**Anthony Byrne**	Jason Wood (Lib)	Polly Morgan	Theos Patrinos	Lynne Dickson (CDP); Gordon Ford (Ind)
Hotham	Labor	**Simon Crean**	Priscilla Ruffolo (Lib)	Jessica Joss	Ollie Bennett	Simon Hall (CEC)
Indi	Liberal	Barbara Murdoch	Don Chambers (Nat); Sophie Panopoulos* (Lib)	Robert Chuck	Michael Wardle	Pat Adams (Ind); Lyn Bennetts (ON); Nelson McIntosh (Ind); Philip Seymour (CDP)
Isaacs	Labor	**Ann Corcoran**	Michael Shepherdson (Lib)	Haydn Fletcher	Darren Bujeya	Patricia Brook (Ind); John Groves (ON); Shirly Oakley (Ind); Heather Stanton (CEC)
Jagajaga	Labor	**Jenny Macklin**	Brett Jones (Lib)	Peter Wigg	Samantha Roberts	Paul Gallagher (CEC); Gary Schorel-Hlavka (Ind)
Kooyong	Liberal	Tom Wilson	**Petro Georgiou** (Lib)	Ari Sharp	Peter Campbell	
Lalor	Labor	**Julia Gillard**	David McConnell (Lib)	Roger Howe	Tony Briffa	
La Trobe	Liberal	Philip Staindl	**Bob Charles** (Lib)	Tony Holland	Craig Smith	Jason Allen (Ind); Frank Dean (Ind); June Scott (ON); Wolfgang Voigt (CDP)
Mallee	National	John Zigouras	**John Forrest** (Nat)	Timothy Kelly	Julie Rivendell	Ross Douglass (Ind); Bob Mackley (ON)
Maribyrnong	Labor	**Bob Sercombe**	Grahame Barclay (Lib)	Charles Williams	Jules Beckwith	Andre Kozlowski (CEC)
McEwen	Liberal	Andrew MacLeod	**Fran Bailey** (Lib)	Tony Carden	Jim Romagnesi	Bill Lodwick (Ind); Alan Salter (ON)
McMillan	Liberal	**Christian Zahra**	Jim Forbes (Lib); David Roberts (Nat)	David Wall	Jenny Farrar	John Holtman (ON); Betty Howell (Ind)
Melbourne	Labor	**Lindsay Tanner**	Con Frantzeskos (Lib)	Brent McKenna	Pamela Curr	James Ferrari (Ind); Stephen Jolly (Ind)
Melbourne Ports	Labor	**Michael Danby**	Andrew McLorinan (Lib)	Greg Chipp	Jeannette Kavanagh	Jeremy Beck (CEC)
Menzies	Liberal	Olga Vasilopoulos	**Kevin Andrews** (Lib)	Michael Ryan	Barry Watson	Brendan Griffin (NGST)
Murray	Liberal	Alan Calder	**Sharman Stone** (Lib)	Elizabeth Taylor	David Jones	Simon Bush (Ind); Robert Hellemons (ON)
Scullin	Labor	**Harry Jenkins**	Lucas Kostadinoski (Lib)	Brian Mawhinney	Merinda Gray	Trudy Campbell (CEC)
Wannon	Liberal	Richard Morrow	**David Hawker** (Lib)	Amanda Packer	Gillian Blair	Leigh McDonald (Ind); Robert O'Brien (Ind); Olive Schmidt (ON); Ricky Witney (LEF)
Wills	Labor	**Kelvin Thomson**	Vytautas Valasinavicius (Lib)	Robert Stone	Richard Di Natale	David Glanz (Ind); Craig Isherwood (CEC)

=== Western Australia ===
Electorate	Held by	Labor	Liberal	Democrats	Greens	One Nation	Other
Brand	Labor	**Kim Beazley**	Margaret Thomas	Paul Hubbard	Kate Davis	Steve Robbie	Terry Iredale (CDP); Brian McCarthy (CEC); Keith Woollard (LFF)
Canning	Labor	**Jane Gerick**	Don Randall	Darren Brown	Keith Read	Angelo Dacheff	Doug Kennedy (CDP); John Macdonald (CEC)
Cowan	Labor	**Graham Edwards**	Andre Shannon	Tracy Chaloner	Dave Fort	Ron Holt	Sue Metcalf (Nat); Paul Salmon (CDP)
Curtin	Liberal	Trish Fowler	**Julie Bishop**	Ashley Buckle	Steve Walker	Neil Gilmour	Karen McDonald (CDP); G Wood (LFF)
Forrest	Liberal	Tresslyn Smith	**Geoff Prosser**	Alison Wylie	Paul Llewellyn	Alan Giorgi	Charles Caldwell (Nat); Arthur Harvey (CEC); Megan Kirwan (CLA)
Fremantle	Labor	**Carmen Lawrence**	Louise Smyth	Rod Swift	Robert Delves	Chris Reynolds	Sarah Harris (Ind); Michelle Shave (CDP)
Hasluck	Labor	Sharryn Jackson	Bethwyn Chan	Peter Markham	Luke Edmonds	James Hopkinson	Michael Daniels (CLA); Ros Hegarty (Nat); Ronnie McLean (CEC); Terry Ryan (CDP)
Kalgoorlie	Liberal	Paul Browning	**Barry Haase**	Don Hoddy	Laurie Miller	Robin Scott	Ian Burt (CLA); Clark Butson (Ind); Peter McCumstie (Nat); Callum Payne (CEC); Neville Smith (Ind)
Moore	Liberal	Kim Young	**Mal Washer**	Clive Oliver	Andrew Roy	John Evans	Geof Henderson (Ind)
O'Connor	Liberal	Mark Pendlebury	**Wilson Tuckey**	Carole Pestana	Sandy Davis	Ron McLean	Vicki Brown (Nat); Stephan Gyorgy (Ind); Terry Iturbide (CEC); Alistair McNabb (CDP); Donna Selby (LFF)
Pearce	Liberal	Liam Costello	**Judi Moylan**	Jack Fox	Juanita Miller	Ken Collins	Vivian Hill (CDP); Chris Nelson (Nat); Stuart Smith (CEC)
Perth	Labor	**Stephen Smith**	Rod Webb	Aaron Hewett	Alison Xamon	Peter Gilberthorpe	Philip Chilton (Ind)
Stirling	Labor	**Jann McFarlane**	Bob Cronin	Pat Olver	Heather Aquilina	Keith Thorogood	Perry Jasper (LFF); Keith McEncroe (CDP)
Swan	Labor	**Kim Wilkie**	Bev Brennan	Paul McCutcheon	Elena Jeffreys	Sandra Vinciullo	Simon Makin (CLA); Brian Smith (CEC); Colleen Tapley (CDP)
Tangney	Liberal	Sam Gowegati	**Daryl Williams**	Andrew Ingram	Ben Stanwix	Aaron Lumsdaine	Gordon Graham (Ind); Michael Lucas (LFF); Craig Watson (CDP)

== Senate ==
Sitting senators are shown in bold text. Tickets that elected at least one Senator are highlighted in the relevant colour. Successful candidates are identified by an asterisk (*).

=== Australian Capital Territory ===
Two Senate places were up for election. The Labor Party was defending one seat. The Liberal Party was defending one seat.

Labor	Liberal	Democrats	Greens	One Nation
1. **Kate Lundy***; 2. Robin Poke	1. **Margaret Reid***; 2. Bill Hanlon	1. Wayne Sievers; 2. Roslyn Dundas	1. Gary Corr; 2. Felicity Fahey	1. Don Tarlinton; 2. Ted Tarlinton
Christian Democrats	Ungrouped			
1. Ian McClure; 2. Tim Janes	James Arnold (CEC); Ken Helm (Ind)			

=== New South Wales ===
Six Senate places were up for election. The Labor Party was defending two seats. The Liberal-National Coalition was defending three seats. The Australian Democrats were defending one seat. Senators John Faulkner (Labor), Michael Forshaw (Labor), Bill Heffernan (Liberal), Steve Hutchins (Labor), Aden Ridgeway (Democrats) and John Tierney (Liberal) were not up for re-election.

Labor	Coalition	Democrats	Greens	One Nation
1. Ursula Stephens*; 2. **George Campbell***; 3. Warren Mundine; 4. Joanna Woods	1. **Helen Coonan*** (Lib); 2. **Sandy Macdonald*** (Nat); 3. **Marise Payne*** (Lib); 4. Fiona Nash (Nat); 5. Scot MacDonald (Lib); 6. Terence Tang (Lib)	1. **Vicki Bourne**; 2. Joanne Yates; 3. Craig Chung; 4. Caroline Mayfield; 5. Janine Prince; 6. Julian Evans	1. Kerry Nettle*; 2. John Kaye; 3. Jan Davis; 4. James Ryan	1. Don McKinnon; 2. Rick Putra; 3. Carol Deeney
Christian Democrats	Unity	CEC	Nuclear Disarmament	AAFI
1. George Capsis; 2. Kevin Hume	1. Thang Ngo; 2. Robert McLeod	1. Robert Butler; 2. Glenys Collins	1. Michael Denborough; 2. Yvonne Francis	1. David Kitson; 2. Edwin Woodger
Fishing Party	Progressive Labour	HEMP	Lower Excise	Non-Custodial Parents
1. Robert Smith; 2. David Wiseman	1. Klaas Woldring; 2. Shona Lee	1. Michael Balderstone; 2. Don Fuggle	1. David O'Loughlin; 2. Paul Freeman	1. Andy Thompson; 2. Annette McKeegan
No GST	Republican	Advance Australia	Reform the Legal System	Our Common Future
1. Mick Gallagher; 2. Charles Martin	1. Kerry McNally; 2. Tom Jordan	1. Rex Connor Jr.; 2. Robert Astridge; 3. Shirley Guy	1. Denise Greenaway; 2. Valerie Armstrong	1. Helen Caldicott; 2. Ted Potts
Group L^{[1]}	Group N^{[2]}	Group U^{[3]}	Ungrouped	
1. Lex Stewart; 2. Joe Stewart	1. Warren Smith; 2. Geoff Lawler; 3. Dora Anthony	1. Pip Hinman; 2. Ian Rintoul	Beverly Baker; F Ivor; Jack Lord; Walter Tinyow	

^{1} Ex-members of One Nation
^{2} Unregistered Communist Party of Australia
^{3} Unregistered Socialist Alliance

=== Northern Territory ===
Two Senate places were up for election. The Labor Party was defending one seat. The Country Liberal Party was defending one seat.

Labor	Country Liberal	Democrats	Greens	One Nation	Group D
1. **Trish Crossin***; 2. Olga Havnen	1. Nigel Scullion*; 2. John Lopes	1. David Curtis; 2. Joe Faggion	1. Melanie Ross; 2. Charlotte McCabe	1. Rob Phillips; 2. Jim King	1. June Mills; 2. Gary Meyerhoff
Ungrouped					
Peter Flynn (CEC)					

=== Queensland ===
Six Senate places were up for election. The Labor Party was defending two seats. The Liberal Party was defending two seats. The National Party was defending one seat. The Australian Democrats were defending one seat. Senators George Brandis (Liberal), John Cherry (Democrats), Len Harris (One Nation), Joe Ludwig (Labor), Brett Mason (Liberal) and Jan McLucas (Labor) were not up for re-election.

Labor	Liberal	National	Democrats	One Nation
1. **John Hogg***; 2. Claire Moore*; 3. **Brenda Gibbs**	1. **Ian Macdonald***; 2. **John Herron***; 3. Russell Trood; 4. Deborah Kember	1. **Ron Boswell***; 2. Pam Stallman; 3. Barnaby Joyce	1. **Andrew Bartlett***; 2. Liz Oss-Emer; 3. Megan Bathurst	1. Pauline Hanson; 2. Trevor Hansen; 3. Morrie Marsden; 4. John Slack-Smith
Greens	Christian Democrats	CEC	HEMP	No GST
1. Sarah Moles; 2. Desiree Mahoney; 3. Mark Taylor	1. Kerry Blackman; 2. Geoffrey Bullock	1. Danny Hope; 2. Nick Contarino	1. Nigel Freemarijuana; 2. Guy Freemarijuana	1. David Ettridge; 2. Richard Gooch
Republican	Group A	Ungrouped		
1. John Pyke; 2. Malcolm Simpson	1. Sam Watson; 2. Karen Fletcher	David Howse; John Jones; Oni Kirwin	Anthony Melrose; Walter Philippi; Phillip Riley	Derek Rosborough; George Szentes

=== South Australia ===
Six Senate places were up for election. The Labor Party was defending two seats. The Liberal Party was defending three seats. The Australian Democrats were defending one seat. Senators Nick Bolkus (Labor), Geoff Buckland (Labor), Alan Ferguson (Liberal), Meg Lees (Democrats), Nick Minchin (Liberal) and Amanda Vanstone (Liberal) were not up for re-election.

Labor	Liberal	Democrats	Greens	One Nation
1. Penny Wong*; 2. Linda Kirk*; 3. **Chris Schacht**	1. **Robert Hill***; 2. **Jeannie Ferris***; 3. **Grant Chapman***; 4. Michelle Lensink	1. **Natasha Stott Despoja***; 2. Jeff Heath; 3. Michael Pilling; 4. Haroon Hassan	1. Cate Faehrmann; 2. Jim Douglas	1. Neil Russell-Taylor; 2. Colin Gibson
Republican	Group E	Group F	Group G	Ungrouped
1. Patrick Crozier; 2. Robert Easson	1. Kathy Newnam; 2. Lisa Lines	1. Mark Aldridge; 2. Helen Aldridge	1. Kerry Harte; 2. Colin Phillips	Ervyn Behn (CEC); Kym Fishlock (Ind); Nicholas McShane (Ind)

=== Tasmania ===
Six Senate places are up for election. The Labor Party was defending two seats. The Liberal Party was defending three seats. The Australian Greens were defending one seat. Senators Eric Abetz (Liberal), Kay Denman (Labor), Brian Gibson (Liberal), Brian Harradine (Independent), Shayne Murphy (Independent) and Kerry O'Brien (Labor) were not up for re-election.

Labor	Liberal	Greens	Democrats	One Nation
1. **Sue Mackay***; 2. **Nick Sherry***; 3. Catryna Bilyk	1. **Paul Calvert***; 2. **John Watson***; 3. Richard Colbeck*; 4. Stephen Parry	1. **Bob Brown***	1. Debbie Butler; 2. Brendan Toohey	1. Bronwyn Boag; 2. Peter Stokes
Tasmania First	Liberals for Forests	Republican	Hope	Group D
1. Merilyn Crack; 2. David Jackson; 3. John Presser	1. Peter Pullinger; 2. Michael Thomas	1. Peter Consandine; 2. Bert Lawatsch	1. James Bristow; 2. Shamara Petherbridge-de Tissera	1. Stephen Bonner; 2. Geoff Howard
Group G	Ungrouped			
1. Alex Bainbridge; 2. Sarah Cleary	Helen Lane (Ind); Rob Larner (CEC); Eric Lockett (Ind); John Marmarinos (Ind)			

=== Victoria ===
Six Senate places were up for election. The Labor Party was defending two seats. The Liberal-National Coalition was defending three seats. The Australian Democrats were defending one seat. Senators Kim Carr (Labor), Jacinta Collins (Labor), Stephen Conroy (Labor), Julian McGauran (National), Tsebin Tchen (Liberal) and Judith Troeth (Liberal) were not up for re-election.

Labor	Coalition	Democrats	Greens	One Nation
1. **Robert Ray***; 2. Gavin Marshall*; 3. Ted Murphy; 4. Robert Chong	1. **Richard Alston*** (Lib); 2. **Rod Kemp*** (Lib); 3. **Kay Patterson*** (Lib); 4. Tim Hawker (Nat); 5. Dino de Marchi (Lib); 6. Duc-Dung Tran (Lib)	1. **Lyn Allison***; 2. Pierre Harcourt; 3. David Wark; 4. Simone Alesich	1. Scott Kinnear; 2. Eleisha Mullane; 3. Dinesh Mathew; 4. Liz Conor	1. Robyn Spencer; 2. Neville McIntyre
DLP	Unity	Christian Democrats	Liberals for Forests	CEC
1. John Mulholland; 2. Pat Crea; 3. Gail King; 4. Rosemary Maurus; 5. Ken Wells	1. Wellington Lee; 2. Diana Wolowski; 3. Bill Cope	1. Murray Graham; 2. Arnold Jago	1. Suresh Pathy; 2. John Lugg	1. Noelene Isherwood; 2. Robert Barwick
Cleary	Hope	Group E	Group F	Group J
1. Phil Cleary; 2. Eileen Zombolas	1. Tim Petherbridge; 2. Lee-anne Poynton	1. Joseph Toscano; 2. Stephen Reghenzani	1. Steve Raskovy; 2. Elizabeth Kennedy	1. A. T. Baker; 2. Pam Barber
Group N	Group Q	Ungrouped		
1. Craig Davis; 2. Donna Brocas	1. Alison Thorne; 2. Sarah Peart; 3. Tony Dewberry	Daniel Flood; Isaac Gnieslaw; Richard Maslowski		

=== Western Australia ===
Six Senate places were up for election. The Labor Party was defending two seats. The Liberal Party was defending three seats. The Australian Democrats were defending one seat. Senators Ian Campbell (Liberal), Peter Cook (Labor), Chris Ellison (Liberal), Chris Evans (Labor), Brian Greig (Democrats) and Sue Knowles (Liberal) were not up for re-election.

Labor	Liberal	National	Greens	Democrats
1. **Mark Bishop***; 2. Ruth Webber*; 3. Mark Cuomo; 4. Gavin Waugh	1. **Alan Eggleston***; 2. David Johnston*; 3. **Ross Lightfoot***; 4. **Winston Crane**; 5. Kim Keogh; 6. Nigel Hallett	1. Hendy Cowan; 2. Margaret Day	1. Rachel Siewert; 2. Lee Bell; 3. Paul Smith; 4. Jenna Zed	1. **Andrew Murray***; 2. Helen Hodgson; 3. Damian Meyer
One Nation	Christian Democrats	CEC	Liberals for Forests	Unity
1. Graeme Campbell; 2. Gerry Kenworthy; 3. Marye Daniels; 4. Peter David	1. Justin Moseley; 2. Kerry Watterson	1. Jean Robertson; 2. John Watson	1. Liz Davenport; 2. Arthur Harris	1. Eddie Hwang; 2. Nicholas Chin
Progressive Labour	Curtin Labor	Taxi Operators	Group A	Group B
1. Mary Lupi; 2. Helen Whooley	1. Adrian Bennett; 2. June Bennett	1. Alan Bateson; 2. Ramon Kennedy	1. Jim Dalton; 2. Kate Dalton	1. Geoff Taylor; 2. Henry Sheil
Group K	Group M	Ungrouped		
1. Frank Nesci; 2. Renu Schneider	1. Clarrie Isaacs; 2. Daniel Watson	Jennifer Lee		

== Summary by party ==
Beside each party is the number of seats contested by that party in the House of Representatives for each state, as well as an indication of whether the party contested the Senate election in the respective state.

Party	NSW		Vic		Qld		WA		SA		Tas		ACT		NT		Total	
Party	HR	S	HR	S	HR	S	HR	S	HR	S	HR	S	HR	S	HR	S	HR	S
Australian Labor Party	50	*	37	*	27	*	15	*	12	*	5	*	2	*	2	*	150	8
Liberal Party of Australia	41	*	35	*	22	*	15	*	12	*	5	*	2	*			132	7
National Party of Australia	11	*	3	*	11	*	6	*									31	4
Country Liberal Party															2	*	2	1
Australian Democrats	50	*	37	*	27	*	15	*	12	*	5	*	2	*	2	*	150	8
Australian Greens	50	*	37	*	27	*	15	*	12	*	5	*	2	*	2	*	150	8
One Nation	48	*	14	*	27	*	15	*	12	*	4	*	2	*	2	*	124	8
Christian Democratic Party	30	*	5	*			11	*					2	*			48	4
Citizens Electoral Council	9	*	12	*	7	*	8	*		*	1	*		*		*	37	8
Unity Party	17	*		*				*									17	3
No GST Party	6	*	3			*			2								11	2
Australians Against Further Immigration	9	*															9	1
Liberals for Forests			1	*			5	*			1	*					7	3
Non-Custodial Parents Party	6	*															6	1
Curtin Labor Alliance							4	*									4	1
Save the ADI Site Party	4																4	
HEMP Party	2	*			1	*											3	2
Lower Excise Fuel and Beer Party	2	*	1														3	1
Progressive Labour Party	2	*						*									2	2
The Fishing Party	1	*															1	1
Tasmania First Party											1	*					1	1
Outdoor Recreation Party					1												1	
Republican Party of Australia		*				*				*		*						4
Hope Party Australia				*								*						2
Advance Australia Party		*																1
Helen Caldicott - Our Common Future		*																1
Nuclear Disarmament Party		*																1
Reform the Legal System		*																1
Democratic Labor Party				*														1
Phil Cleary - Independent Australia				*														1
Taxi Operators Political Service								*										1
Independent and other	56		38		29		7		9				1		3		143	

== See also ==
- 2001 Australian federal election
- Members of the Australian House of Representatives, 1998–2001
- Members of the Australian House of Representatives, 2001–2004
- Members of the Australian Senate, 1999–2002
- Members of the Australian Senate, 2002–2005
- List of political parties in Australia
