= Richard Cleaver =

Australian politician

Richard Cleaver AM, CBE
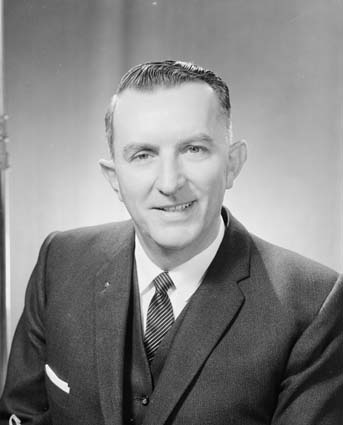

Member of the Australian Parliament for Swan
- In office 10 December 1955 – 25 October 1969
- Preceded by: Harry Webb
- Succeeded by: Adrian Bennett

Personal details
- Born: 16 August 1917 Perth, Western Australia, Australia
- Died: 25 October 2006 (aged 89) Murdoch, Western Australia, Australia
- Party: Liberal
- Occupation: Accountant

Richard Cleaver AM, CBE (16 August 1917 – 25 October 2006) was an Australian politician. He was a member of the Liberal Party and represented the seat of Swan in the House of Representatives from 1955 to 1969.

== Early life ==
Cleaver was born in Perth on 16 August 1917. He was educated at Perth Modern School. He was an accountant before entering politics and was a fellow of the Australian Society of Accountants and the Chartered Institute of Secretaries.

During World War II, Cleaver joined the Citizen Military Forces in September 1941 and transferred to the Australian Imperial Force in October 1942. He served with several anti-tank regiments and was later attached to the headquarters of III Corps and Northern Territory Force. He was discharged with the rank of major in May 1946, with his final post being deputy assistant quartermaster general of Western Command.

== Politics ==
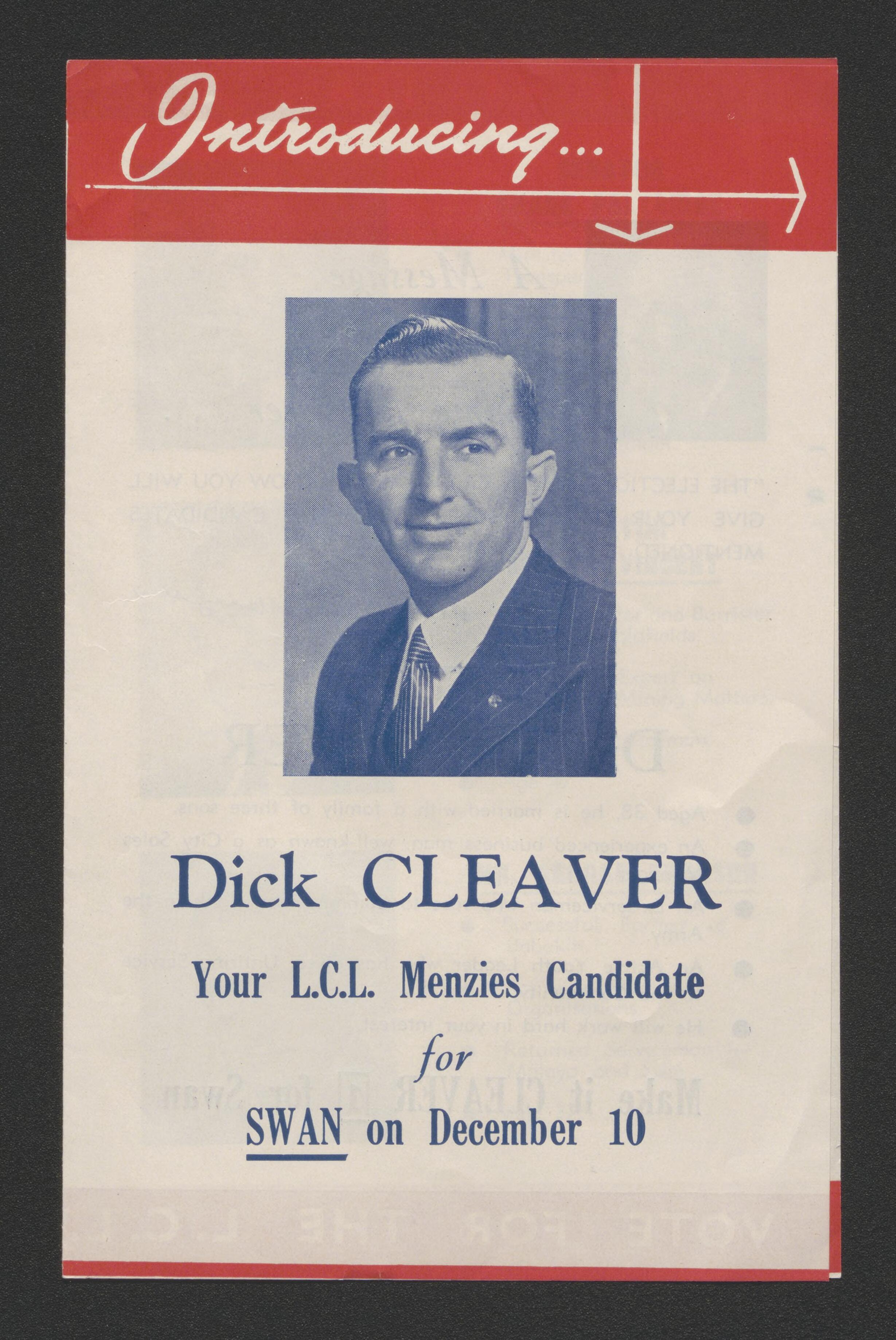
Campaign material used by Cleaver in 1955

Cleaver was elected to the House of Representatives at the 1955 federal election, winning the seat of Swan from the Australian Labor Party (ALP). He was re-elected on four further occasions before being defeated by ALP candidate Adrian Bennett at the 1969 election. During the election campaign he was attacked while campaigning in Victoria Park and received facial injuries.

Cleaver was known as a strong local campaigner, with Swan remaining a marginal seat throughout his tenure. The Canberra Times wrote in 1969 that he was "active in the electorate's youth organisations, sportings clubs and community activities [...] his latest projects are a home for the frail aged and a cultural centre for Italian migrants". In the early 1960s he founded Swan Cottage Homes, a major aged care complex in Bentley, Western Australia.

In parliament, Cleaver served as chair of the Joint Statutory Committee on Public Accounts from 1964 to 1969. In that capacity he played a role in the VIP aircraft affair of 1967, which proved politically damaging for the Holt government. He was one of the first Coalition MPs to express concerns over the government's use of VIP aircraft and in April 1966 suggested a parliamentary inquiry be held to pre-empt criticisms. He was rebuffed by Prime Minister Harold Holt, but following further public scrutiny he and Senate leader John Gorton lobbied Holt in October 1967 to make public full details of VIP flights.

Cleaver unsuccessfully sought to return to parliament at the 1972 election, losing to Adrian Bennett in a rematch of the 1969 election.

== Personal life ==
Cleaver was a prominent Methodist lay preacher. In 1959 he spoke at one of American evangelist Billy Graham's "crusades" in Canberra. In 1968 he was the national president of the Australian Union of Christian Endeavour.

Cleaver was appointed Commander of the Order of the British Empire (CBE) in 1979 for "services to the community". He was made a Member of the Order of Australia (AM) in 1998 for "service to the aged in the community, in particular as the founder and chairman for more than 37 years of Swan Cottage Homes Incorporated".

Cleaver died on 25 October 2006 at St John of God Murdoch Hospital in Perth. He was married and had four sons.

Parliament of Australia
Preceded by Harry Webb	Member for Swan; 1955–1969	Succeeded by Adrian Bennett
