= Liz Davenport =

Australian fashion designer

Elizabeth Anne Davenport OAM (born 12 April 1945) is an Australian fashion designer and businesswoman.

Davenport is a managing director of Liz Davenport Fashion Pty Ltd, and long-term campaigner for conservation of Australian old-growth forest. She stood as a Liberals for Forests candidate for the electoral district of Nedlands against Premier Richard Court in 2001 elections for the Western Australian Legislative Assembly. While she was defeated, she pushed Labor into second place and slashed Court's majority to 4.9 percent. She also stood as one of the candidates of the 2001 Australian federal election, but again was not elected.

== Honours ==
Awards that Davenport has received in Australia include:

- Medal of the Order of Australia (OAM), "For service to the fashion industry, and to the community".
- HRH Queen Sirikit of Thailand – Silk Festival
- Finalist of the 2011 Western Australia Citizen of the Year
