= John Martyr =

Australian politician (1932–2021)

Member of the Australian Parliament for Swan
- In office 13 December 1975 – 18 October 1980
- Preceded by: Adrian Bennett
- Succeeded by: Kim Beazley

Senator for Western Australia
- In office 11 March 1981 – 4 February 1983
- Preceded by: Allan Rocher

Personal details
- Born: 25 May 1932 Melbourne, Victoria
- Died: 18 June 2021 (aged 89) Perth, Western Australia
- Party: Labor (to 1955); DLP (1956–74); Liberal (1974–83)
- Spouse: Doris Dent
- Occupation: Political consultant

John Raymond Martyr (25 May 1932 – 18 June 2021) was an Australian politician. He was a member of the House of Representatives from 1975 to 1980 and later served as a Senator for Western Australia from 1981 to 1983, representing the Liberal Party.

Prior to his parliamentary career, Martyr had served as state secretary of the Democratic Labor Party (DLP) from 1964 to 1971 and stood for parliament as a DLP candidate on numerous occasions. He had originally been a member of the Australian Labor Party (ALP) but was expelled during the 1955 ALP split. He was known for his social conservatism and association with the anti-abortion movement.

== Early life ==
Martyr was born in Melbourne on 25 May 1932. He was the first of two sons born to Ellen Mary (née Goodwin) and Ernest John Martyr. His father was from a working-class background and served briefly with the Australian Imperial Force during World War I, later joining the Royal Australian Navy.

Martyr's father died in 1935 when he was three years old. He and his brother were raised by their mother, living in East Brunswick and Caulfield. After leaving school he worked as a sales representative and was a member of the Federated Clerks' Union. He settled in Ferntree Gully where he was active in the local debating society.

== Politics ==
=== Labor and DLP ===
Martyr joined the Australian Labor Party (ALP) at a young age and was active in the anti-communist Catholic Social Studies Movement led by B. A. Santamaria. He was expelled from the ALP's Elsternwick branch following the 1955 party split and became a foundation member of the breakaway Australian Labor Party (Anti-Communist), later known as the Democratic Labor Party (DLP). He first stood for parliament as a DLP candidate at the 1960 La Trobe by-election.

In 1962, Martyr moved to Perth to work as the Western Australian state president of the National Civic Council, which was closely linked with Santamaria and the DLP. He additionally became state secretary of the DLP in 1964 and contested numerous state and federal elections as a DLP candidate. Martyr resigned as state secretary of the DLP in December 1971, as part of a mass resignation of four members of the state executive.

=== Liberal Party ===
In June 1972, it was reported that Martyr and former DLP state president Frank Pownall had left the DLP and defected to the Liberal Party, becoming vice-presidents of the Liberals' Victoria Park branch. He won Liberal preselection for the Division of Swan in January 1975.

Martyr was elected to the House of Representatives at the 1975 federal election, winning Swan from the incumbent ALP member Adrian Bennett. He was narrowly re-elected at the 1977 election before losing his seat to Kim Beazley at the 1980 election.

On 11 March 1981, he was appointed to the Australian Senate to fill the casual vacancy created by Allan Rocher who resigned to transfer to the House of Representatives. He was defeated, however, in the 1983 election.

In 1982, Martyr used parliamentary privilege to name former New South Wales police minister Bill Crabtree, a member of the ALP, as "possibly being involved with NSW police who were allegedly taking illegal gambling bribes".

=== Political views ===
Martyr was active in the Right to Life Association and regularly spoke against abortion in parliament. In 1980 he unsuccessfully attempted to amend the Fraser government's Human Rights Commission Bill to provide that the International Covenant on Civil and Political Rights would apply from conception. Martyr crossed the floor on several other occasions to vote against the Fraser government, including in 1981 to vote in favour of a sunset clause for the Two Airlines Policy and in 1982 to oppose what he called the "dreadful practice of punitive retrospectivity" in relation to the Taxation (Unpaid Company Tax) Assessment Act 1982.

Martyr served on the Joint Select Committee into the Family Law Act from 1978 to 1980. He issued a dissenting report against the minor reforms recommended by the bipartisan committee and in parliament described the act as a "mechanism for breaking up families" that was "designed to smash marriage".

== Personal life ==
In 1956, Martyr married Doris Dent, with whom he had seven children. His wife was also politically active and had also been expelled from the ALP during the 1955 party split.

Martyr died on 18 June 2021, aged 89.

Parliament of Australia
Preceded by Adrian Bennett	Member for Swan; 1975–1980	Succeeded by Kim Beazley
