= Adrian Bennett =

Australian politician (1933–2006)

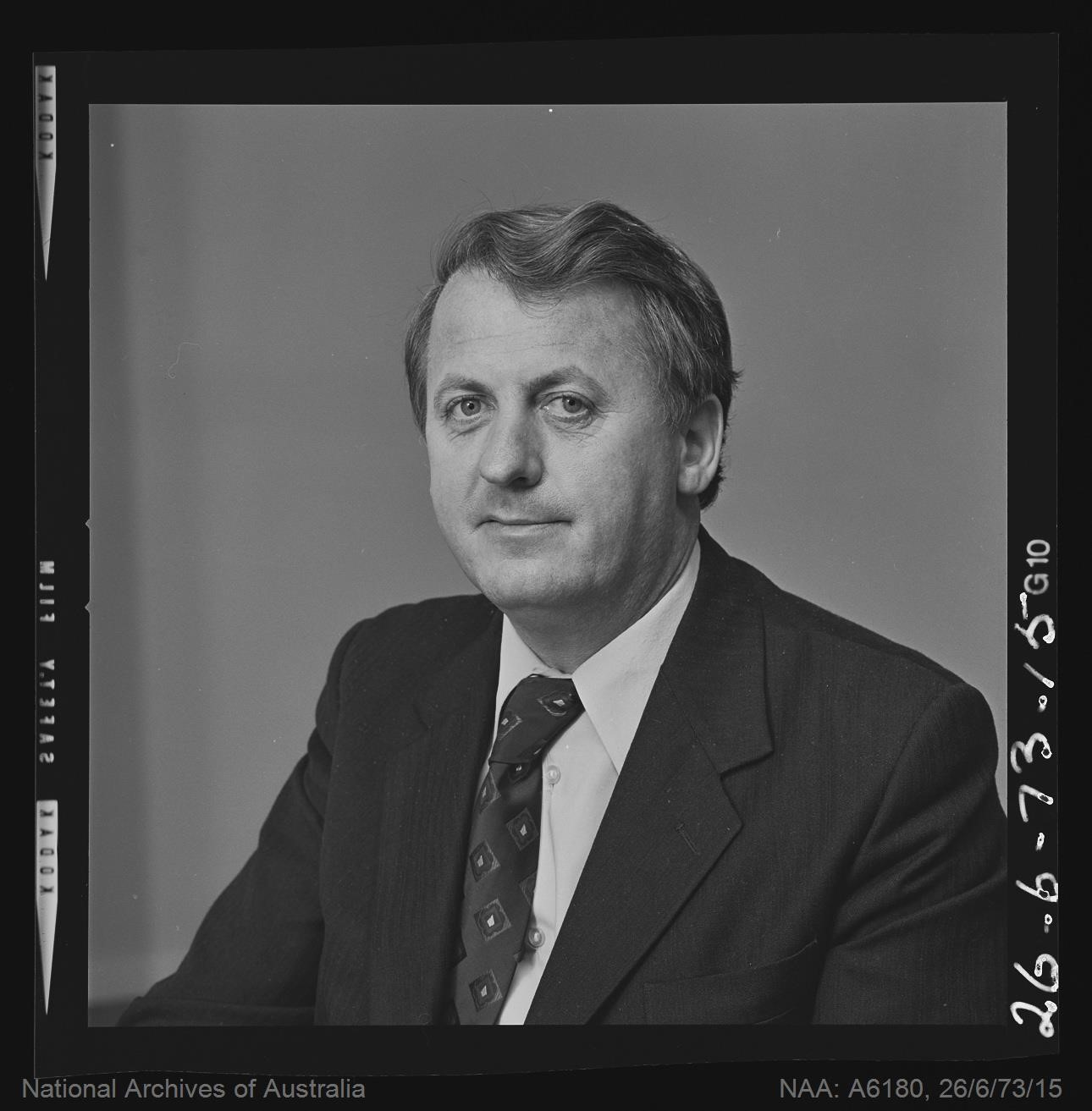

Member of the Australian Parliament for Swan
- In office 25 October 1969 – 13 December 1975
- Preceded by: Richard Cleaver
- Succeeded by: John Martyr

Personal details
- Born: 21 January 1933 Perth, Western Australia
- Died: 9 May 2006 (aged 73)
- Party: Labor; Curtin Labor Alliance (from 2000)
- Occupation: Transport worker

Adrian Frank Bennett (21 January 1933 – 9 May 2006) was an Australian politician. He was a member of the House of Representatives from 1969 to 1975, holding the Western Australian seat of Swan for the Australian Labor Party (ALP). In later life he was associated with the LaRouche movement and helped establish the Curtin Labor Alliance.

== Early life ==
Bennett was born in Perth on 21 January 1933. He was educated at Catholic schools before becoming a transport worker. He was state secretary of the Transport Workers' Union and also sat on the Canning Shire Council, including as deputy president for a period. In 1969 he was said by The Canberra Times to be "heavily involved in youth work and with parents and citizens' associations".

== Politics ==
=== Federal parliament ===
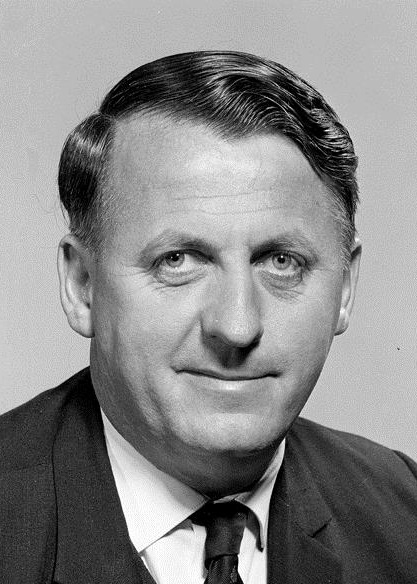
Bennett in 1970

A delegate to the ALP state executive, Bennett was elected to the House of Representatives at the 1969 federal election, defeating the incumbent Liberal Party member Richard Cleaver in the seat of Swan. His victory reportedly "surprised himself and most political observers".

Bennett defeated Cleaver in a rematch at the 1972 election. He was re-elected in 1974 but lost his seat to Liberal candidate John Martyr at the 1975 election. Bennett was known for driving his car from Perth to Canberra for each session, a journey of around 2,500 miles (4,000 km) or three days each way. In parliament he spoke against the racial segregation of ex-servicemen's clubs in the Territory of Papua New Guinea. He also signed petitions supporting Australian recognition of the Provisional Revolutionary Government of the Republic of South Vietnam and supporting the Builders Labourers Federation's green bans.

=== Later activities ===
In 1976, Bennett was president of the Association for the Abolition of the Means Test, which sought to remove the means test for the aged pension. He and his supporters drove a double-decker bus from Perth to Melbourne and Adelaide to collect signatures on a petition and organise local committees.

In later life, Bennett was the secretary of the Municipal Employees Union of Western Australia (MEU), an organisation associated with the LaRouche movement. In 2000, he became the inaugural chairman of the Curtin Labor Alliance, a LaRouchite political party formed as a joint venture of the MEU and the Citizens Electoral Council. In a speech to its inaugural conference, Bennett predicted an imminent global financial collapse and stated that the "new party will change the course of this nation in the very near future". He described Lyndon LaRouche as the "world's leading economist" and attributed the LaRouche criminal trials to a conspiracy by the "global oligarchy". He further stated that the dismissal of the Whitlam government had been engineered by the British government and that the subsequent Hawke and Keating governments were controlled by the oligarchy.

Bennett was an unsuccessful candidate for the Curtin Labor Alliance at the 2001 Western Australian state election and 2001 Australian Senate election.

Parliament of Australia
Preceded by Richard Cleaver	Member for Swan; 1969–1975	Succeeded by John Martyr
