= Curtin Labor Alliance =

Australian political coalition

- Abbreviation: CLA; Curtin Alliance
- Chairman: Adrian Bennett
- Founder: Adrian Bennett
- Founded: April 2000
- Dissolved: c. 2005
- Headquarters: Perth, Western Australia
- Ideology: LaRouchism

Website
- curtinalliance.org (archived)

The Curtin Labor Alliance (CLA) was a minor Australian political party established in 2000. It was affiliated with the LaRouche Movement and was formed in Western Australia as a joint venture of the Citizens Electoral Council (CEC) and the Municipal Employees Union of Western Australia. The party's chairman was former Australian Labor Party (ALP) MP Adrian Bennett.

The CLA was a registered political party with the Australian Electoral Commission from 2001 to 2005, despite an unsuccessful attempt by the ALP to prevent its registration on the grounds its name was intended to mislead voters. The party contested the 2001 Western Australian state election and 2001 Australian federal election, on both occasions polling a negligible number of votes.

== History ==
The CLA was founded in April 2000 as a joint venture of two LaRouchite organisations, the Citizens Electoral Council (CEC) and the Municipal Employees Union of Western Australia (MEU). Adrian Bennett, secretary of the MEU and a former Australian Labor Party (ALP) federal MP, was the party's chairman. The party claimed to have attracted over 100 attendees to its inaugural conference in Perth. A pre-recorded 40-minute video address by Lyndon LaRouche was played at the conference.

The party was registered with the Australian Electoral Commission (AEC) on 28 September 2001. It was eventually deregistered by the AEC on 5 December 2005 on the grounds it had failed to stand candidates at a federal election for over four years.

=== Dispute over name ===
The Curtin Labor Alliance's name was drawn from Australian Labor Party leader John Curtin, who was Australia's prime minister during World War II. The CLA's attempts to register as a political party were met with "outrage" from ALP officials, who regarded the party's name on a slur on the legacy of John Curtin. The ALP and several other commentators also viewed the use of the word "labor" in the party's name as an attempt to deceive and confuse voters, with the ALP releasing a statement stating the CLA had adopted its name "solely for the purposes of encouraging genuine ALP supporters to vote for an unrelated, extreme right-wing front party".

The ALP lodged objections to the proposed registration of the CLA as a political party, on the grounds that voters were "likely to think they were the same party and/or had a close political connection". The Western Australian Electoral Commission (WAEC) upheld the ALP's objection and refused to register the CLA for state elections in Western Australia, while at federal level the AEC stated that there were no grounds to reject the registration and that the ALP did not have a monopoly on the word "labo(u)r", with several other registered parties having similar names.

== Views and positions ==
The party's chairman Adrian Bennett claimed the CLA's platform was "based on the proved policies of the 1940s John Curtin government". At the party's inaugural conference, he praised Lyndon LaRouche as the "world's greatest economist" and echoed LaRouche's calls for a return to the Bretton Woods system. Bennett also said the ALP had become an "Anti-Labor Party" during the Hawke–Keating government and "spit upon the very national banking, protectionist tradition upon which the early Labor Party was founded". He further attributed the dismissal of the Whitlam government to a conspiracy by the British government and called on Australia to become a republic.

The B'nai B'rith Anti-Defamation Commission of Australia assessed the CLA as a front for the CEC and issued warnings about the wider LaRouche movement's association with antisemitic conspiracy theories. Writing for the Australian Jewish News, Alan Gold and Benseon Apple described the CLA as "an attempt by the CEC to gain political respectability, disguise its racist agenda and appeal to a broader audience of traditional ALP voters".

== Electoral record ==
The CLA fielded twelve candidates in Legislative Assembly seats at the 2001 Western Australian state election, winning 0.40 percent of the statewide vote. The party's tickets in the Legislative Council won 0.86 percent of the statewide vote. The CLA failed to secure registration in time for the election, and as a result its candidates were listed as unaffiliated on ballot papers.

At the 2001 federal election, the CLA stood candidates in four House of Representatives seats in Western Australia, polling 0.23 percent of the statewide vote. Bennett and his wife June were the party's candidates for the Senate, polling 0.32 percent of the statewide vote
