= Electoral results for the Australian Senate in Western Australia =

This is a list of electoral results for the Australian Senate in Western Australia since Federation in 1901.

== Election results ==
=== Elections in the 2020s ===
==== 2025 ====
The Western Australian senators whose terms expire due to this election are as follows:

- Jordon Steele-John (GRN)
- The Hon Linda Reynolds (LP)
- Slade Brockman (LP)
- Louise Pratt (ALP)
- Matt O'Sullivan (LP)
- Varun Ghosh (ALP) (appointed on 30 November 2023 to fill a casual vacancy caused by the resignation of Pat Dodson)

2025 Australian federal election: Senate, Western Australia
Party	Candidate	Votes	%	±%
Quota		182,677		
Labor	1. Ellie Whiteaker (elected 1); 2. Varun Ghosh (elected 3); 3. Deep Singh; 4. Tarun Dewan; 5. Ally White; 6. Brock Oswald	467,339	36.55	+2.00
Liberal	1. Slade Brockman (elected 2); 2. Matt O'Sullivan (elected 5); 3. Trish Botha; 4. Jennifer Mathews	338,418	26.47	–5.20
Greens	1. Jordon Steele-John (elected 4); 2. Simone Collins; 3. Donald Clarke; 4. Verity Ives; 5. Heather Lonsdale	165,962	12.98	−1.28
One Nation	1. Tyron Whitten; 2. Conor Doyle	89,870	5.87	+2.33
Legalise Cannabis	1. Jason Meotti; 2. Melissa Rose D'Ath	50,311	3.93	+0.55
National	1. Paul Brown; 2. Jeremy Miles	54,963	3.59	+3.57
Christians	1. Steve Klomp; 2. Joan Lee Ng	40,423	2.64	+0.52
Trumpet of Patriots	1. Melissa Bannister; 2. Trent Kenneth Mongan; 3. Peter Robins; 4. Lincoln Stewart (resigned)	25,016	1.63	+1.09
People First	1. Madison King; 2. Jody Clune	21,958	1.43	+1.46
Animal Justice	1. Michael Anagno; 2. Grant Stewart	13,308	1.04	+0.11
Great Australian	1. Rod Culleton; 2. William Newton-Wordsworth	13,588	0.89	−0.15
Australia's Voice	1. Megan Krakouer; 2. Tano La Macchia	8,816	0.69	+0.69
Libertarian	1. Ryan Burns; 2. Gary Nicol	9,464	0.62	+0.62
Sustainable Australia	1. Karen Oborn; 2. Ryan Oostryck	6,523	0.43	+0.04
Democrats	1. Elana Mitchell; 2. Simon Simson	5,084	0.40	+0.10
Citizens	1. Aisha Nancy Novakovich; 2. Rex Michael Ryles	4,384	0.29	+0.17
Socialist Alliance	1. Jade Sobieralski; 2. Riley Breen	3,679	0.24	+0.09
Fusion	1. Tian Carrie-Wilson; 2. Tamara Alderdice	2,684	0.21	−0.14
Ungrouped	Ky Cao; Kim Mubarak	1,013	0.08	−0.27
Total formal votes		1,278,737	96.03	−1.06
Informal votes		52,875	3.97	+1.06
Turnout		1,331,612	70.50	−18.20

Results are not final. Last updated on 11 May 2025 at 8:00 PM AEST.

==== 2022 ====
2022 Australian federal election: Senate, Western Australia
Party	Candidate	Votes	%	±%
Quota		218,018		
Labor	1. Sue Lines (elected 1); 2. Glenn Sterle (elected 3); 3. Fatima Payman (elected 6); 4. Vicki Helps	527,319	34.55	+6.92
Liberal	1. Michaelia Cash (elected 2); 2. Dean Smith (elected 4); 3. Ben Small; 4. Sherry Sufi	483,364	31.67	–9.24
Greens	1. Dorinda Cox (elected 5); 2. River Clarke; 3. Simone Collins; 4. Donald Clarke; 5. Jordan Cahill; 6. Alex Wallace	217,571	14.26	+2.45
One Nation	1. Paul Filing; 2. Sheila Mundy	53,260	3.49	–2.39
Legalise Cannabis	1. Nicola Johnson; 2. Aaron Peet	51,568	3.38	+1.69
Christians	1. Mike Crichton; 2. Maryka Groenewald	33,143	2.17	+0.51
United Australia	1. James McDonald; 2. Rob Forster	32,543	2.13	+0.38
Liberal Democrats	1. Kate Fantinel; 2. Peter McLoughlin	29,511	1.93	+1.21
Western Australia	1. Matthew McDowall; 2. Julie Matheson	26,555	1.74	+0.55
Great Australian	1. Rod Culleton; 2. Samantha Vinci	15,958	1.05	+0.83
Animal Justice	1. Amanda Dorn; 2. Elizabeth McCasker	14,186	0.93	–0.05
Federation	1. Judy Wilyman; 2. Leanne Barrett	8,339	0.55	+0.55
Sustainable Australia	1. Karen Oborn; 2. Ryan Oostryck	5,827	0.38	+0.03
Fusion	1. Tim Viljoen; 2. Adam Woodings	5,342	0.35	+0.35
Democrats	1. Elana Mitchell; 2. Simon Simson	4,630	0.30	+0.30
Informed Medical Options	1. Michelle Kinsella; 2. Leanne Lockyer	3,494	0.23	–0.03
Socialist Alliance	1. Petrina Harley; 2. Alex Salmon	2,494	0.16	+0.03
Australian Values	1. Rebecca Pizzey; 2. Kathy Fitzpatrick	2,305	0.15	+0.15
Social Justice Independents	1. Gerry Georgatos; 2. Megan Krakouer	2,254	0.15	+0.15
Citizens	1. Denise Bradley; 2. Jean Robinson	1,789	0.12	+0.04
Federal ICAC Now	1. Matthew Count; 2. Dianne Watkins	1,540	0.10	+0.10
No Mandatory Vaccination	1. Cam Tinley; 2. Tricia Ayre	993	0.07	+0.07
Ungrouped	Ziggi Murphy; Ashley Buckle; Peter McDonald; Yunous Vagh; Bob Burdett; Valentine Pegrum	2,138	0.14	+0.03
Total formal votes		1,526,123	97.09	+0.49
Informal votes		45,776	2.91	−0.49
Turnout		1,571,899	88.70	–2.27
Party total seats			Seats	±
Labor			5	▲1
Liberal			5	▼1
Greens			2	Steady

#	Senator	Party
1	Sue Lines	Labor
2	Michaelia Cash	Liberal
3	Glenn Sterle	Labor
4	Dean Smith	Liberal
5	Dorinda Cox	Greens
6	Fatima Payman	Labor

=== Elections in the 2010s ===
==== 2019 ====
2019 Australian federal election: Senate, Western Australia
Party	Candidate	Votes	%	±%
Quota		206,661		
Liberal	1. Linda Reynolds (elected 1); 2. Slade Brockman (elected 3); 3. Matt O'Sullivan (elected 4); 4. Trischa Botha	591,860	40.91	+2.40
Labor	1. Pat Dodson (elected 2); 2. Louise Pratt (elected 5); 3. Alana Herbert; 4. Thomas French; 5. Varun Ghosh; 6. Alison Vaughan	399,639	27.63	−0.73
Greens	1. Jordon Steele-John (elected 6); 2. Giz Watson; 3. Heather Lonsdale; 4. Bhuwan Khadka; 5. Jacqueline van Grootel; 6. Jordan Cahill	170,871	11.81	+1.48
One Nation	1. Peter Georgiou; 2. Martin Suter	85,129	5.88	+1.89
United Australia	1. James McDonald; 2. Russel Sewell; 3. Patrick Hardwick	25,296	1.75	+1.75
HEMP	1. Nick Lethbridge; 2. Mark Rayner	24,404	1.69	+1.69
Christians	1. Ellen Joubert; 2. Trevor Young	23,983	1.66	+0.04
National	1. Nick Fardell; 2. Siobhan Blake; 3. Louise Kingston	20,336	1.41	−1.13
Western Australia	1. Julie Matheson; 2. David Freilich; 3. Bruce Thompson; 4. Ron Norris; 5. Rod Bradley	17,213	1.19	+1.19
Shooters, Fishers, Farmers	1. Stuart Ostle; 2. Ronald Lean	17,072	1.18	−0.68
Animal Justice	1. Katrina Love; 2. Courtney Henry	14,130	0.98	+0.04
Liberal Democrats	1. John Gray; 2. Wesley Du Preez	10,438	0.72	−0.07
Pirate	1. Clive Myers; 2. Paul de Abel	8,526	0.59	+0.59
Conservative National	1. David Archibald; 2. Meredith Campbell	8,425	0.58	+0.58
Conservatives	1. Jonathan Crabtree; 2. Peter Castieau; 3. Matt Brazier	6,111	0.42	+0.42
Sustainable Australia	1. Yasmin Bartlett; 2. Colin Scott	4,994	0.35	+0.35
Involuntary Medication Objectors	1. Judith Wilyman; 2. Michelle Kinsella	3,791	0.26	+0.26
Health Australia	1. Teddy Craies; 2. Emily Wallis	3,563	0.25	−0.10
Great Australian	1. Rod Culleton; 2. Wayne Glew	3,196	0.22	+0.22
VOTEFLUX.ORG	1. Melissa Taaffe; 2. Leo Treasure	2,139	0.15	+0.05
Socialist Alliance	1. Petrina Harley; 2. Alex Salmon	1,847	0.12	−0.02
Citizens Electoral Council	1. Jean Robinson; 2. Barry Mason	1,097	0.08	−0.07
Yellow Vest Australia	1. Debbie Robinson; 2. Catherine Gorman	1,034	0.07	−1.34
Ungrouped	Valentine-Clive Pegrum; Ben Mullings; Glenn Hutchinson; Murray Jones; Brian Carew-Hopkins	1,529	0.11	−0.12
Total formal votes		1,446,623	96.60	−0.05
Informal votes		50,909	3.40	+0.05
Turnout		1,497,532	90.97	+1.35

Elected	#	Senator	Party
2019	1	Linda Reynolds	Liberal
2019	2	Pat Dodson	Labor
2019	3	Slade Brockman	Liberal
2019	4	Matt O'Sullivan	Liberal
2019	5	Louise Pratt	Labor
2019	6	Jordon Steele-John	Greens
2016
2016	1	Mathias Cormann	Liberal
2016	2	Sue Lines	Labor
2016	3	Rachel Siewert	Greens
2016	4	Michaelia Cash	Liberal
2016	5	Glenn Sterle	Labor
2016	6	Dean Smith	Liberal

==== 2016 ====
2016 Australian federal election: Senate, Western Australia
Party	Candidate	Votes	%	±%
Quota		105,091		
Liberal	1. Mathias Cormann (elected 1); 2. Michaelia Cash (elected 4); 3. Dean Smith (elected 6); 4. Linda Reynolds (elected 8); 5. Chris Back (elected 9); 6. David Johnston; 7. Sheridan Ingram	525,930	38.50	+4.44
Labor	1. Sue Lines (elected 2); 2. Glenn Sterle (elected 5); 3. Pat Dodson (elected 7); 4. Louise Pratt (elected 10); 5. Mark Reed; 6. Susan Bowers; 7. Mia Onorato	386,142	28.26	+6.73
Greens	1. Scott Ludlam (elected 3) (Note: Ludlam resigned on 14 July 2017 because he was a dual citizen of New Zealand. The Court of Disputed Returns declared he was ineligible to be elected. A special recount led to Steele-John being declared to have been elected instead.); 2. Rachel Siewert (elected 12); 3. Jordon Steele-John; 4. Samantha Jenkinson; 5. Michael Boldock; 6. Rai Ismail	143,814	10.53	−5.07
One Nation	1. Rod Culleton (elected 11) (Note: Culleton was found ineligible by the Court of Disputed Returns. A special recount led to Georgiou being declared to have been elected on 10 March 2017.); 2. Peter Georgiou; 3. Ioanna Culleton	54,492	3.99	+3.99
National	1. Kado Muir; 2. Nick Fardell; 3. Elizabeth Re	34,633	2.54	−0.50
Xenophon	1. Luke Bolton; 2. Michael Bovell	29,680	2.17	+2.17
Shooters, Fishers, Farmers	1. Andrew Skerritt; 2. Ross Williamson	25,375	1.86	+0.83
Sex Party–HEMP joint ticket	1. Michael Balderstone; 2. James Hurley	25,108	1.84	+1.84
Christians	1. Lindsay Cameron; 2. Jacky Young	22,089	1.62	+0.08
Liberty Alliance	1. Debbie Robinson; 2. Marion Hercock	15,208	1.11	+1.11
Christian Democrats	1. Mark Imisides; 2. Philip Read	13,771	1.01	+1.01
Animal Justice	1. Katrina Love; 2. Alicia Sutton	12,702	0.93	+0.28
Liberal Democrats	1. Graeme Klass; 2. Connor Whittle	10,775	0.79	−1.03
Justice	1. Nicki Hide; 2. Rachael Higgins	10,116	0.74	+0.74
Democratic Labour	1. Fernando Bove; 2. Troy Kiernan	9,420	0.69	+0.48
Family First	1. Linda Rose; 2. Henry Heng	8,746	0.64	−0.10
Palmer United	1. Dio Wang; 2. Jacque Kruger	5,008	0.37	−11.97
Health Australia	1. Samantha Tilbury; 2. Sara Fargher	4,786	0.35	+0.35
Renewable Energy	1. Pedro Schwindt; 2. Camilla Sundbladh	4,632	0.34	+034
Rise Up Australia	1. Anthony Hardwick; 2. Sheila Mundy	3,743	0.27	+0.10
Arts	1. Robert Buratti; 2. Robert Taylor	3,037	0.22	+0.22
Australia First	1. Lyn Vickery; 2. Brian McRea	3,027	0.22	+0.22
Mature Australia	1. Stuart Donald; 2. Patti Bradshaw	2,697	0.20	+0.20
Cyclists	1. Peter Mah; 2. Christopher Howard	2,682	0.20	+0.20
Citizens Electoral Council	1. Jean Robinson; 2. Judy Sudholz	2,049	0.15	+0.15
Socialist Alliance	1. Kamala Emanuel; 2. Seamus Doherty; 3. Farida Iqbal	1,990	0.15	+0.09
VOTEFLUX.ORG	1. Richard Thomas; 2. Mark Connolly	1,392	0.10	+0.10
Ungrouped	Kai Jones; Tammara Moody; Julie Matheson; Peter Castieau; Susan Hoddinott; Norm Ramsay	3,148	0.23	−0.40
Total formal votes		1,366,182	96.65	−0.85
Informal votes		47,371	3.35	+0.85
Turnout		1,413,553	89.55	+1.05

#	Senator	Party
1	Mathias Cormann	Liberal
2	Sue Lines	Labor
3	Scott Ludlam	Greens
4	Michaelia Cash	Liberal
5	Glenn Sterle	Labor
6	Dean Smith	Liberal
7	Pat Dodson	Labor
8	Linda Reynolds	Liberal
9	Chris Back	Liberal
10	Louise Pratt	Labor
11	Rod Culleton	One Nation
12	Rachel Siewert	Greens

==== 2014 special election ====
2014 special election in Western Australia: Senate, Western Australia
Party	Candidate	Votes	%	±%
Quota		182,544		
Liberal	1. David Johnston (elected 1); 2. Michaelia Cash (elected 4); 3. Linda Reynolds (elected 6); 4. Slade Brockman	435,220	34.06	−8.93
Labor	1. Joe Bullock (elected 2); 2. Louise Pratt; 3. Shane Hill; 4. Klara Andric	275,094	21.53	−8.17
Greens	1. Scott Ludlam (elected 3); 2. Christine Cunningham; 3. Ian James; 4. Jordon Steele-John; 5. Sarah Nielsen-Harvey; 6. Judith Cullity	199,358	15.60	+1.64
Palmer United	1. Dio Wang (elected 5); 2. Des Headland; 3. Chamonix Terblanche	157,740	12.34	+12.34
National	1. Shane Van Styn; 2. Colin de Grussa	38,818	3.04	−0.39
Liberal Democrats	1. Jim Fryar; 2. Neil Hamilton	23,251	1.82	+0.64
Christians	1. Jamie Van Burgel; 2. Justin Moseley	19,649	1.54	+1.54
HEMP	1. James Moylan; 2. Tayla Moylan	13,579	1.06	+1.06
Shooters and Fishers	1. Murray Bow; 1. John Parkes	13,162	1.03	+0.43
Sex Party	1. Steve Palmer; 2. Mark Coleman	12,109	0.95	−1.30
Family First	1. Linda Rose; 2. Henry Heng	9,471	0.74	−0.41
Voluntary Euthanasia	1. Philip Nitschke; 2. Jim Duffield	8,598	0.67	+0.67
Animal Justice	1. Katrina Love; 2. Alicia Sutton	8,288	0.65	+0.65
Wikileaks	1. Tibor Meszaros; 2. Lucy Nicol	8,062	0.63	+0.63
Group C (Save our ABC)	1. Russell Woolf; 2. Verity James	7,779	0.61	
Motoring Enthusiasts	1. Richie Howlett; 2. Rob Zandvliet	6,995	0.55	+0.55
Pirate	1. Fletcher Boyd; 2. Michelle Allen	6,270	0.49	+0.49
Fishing and Lifestyle	1. Daniel McCarthy; 2. Suzzanne Wyatt	4,628	0.36	+0.36
Australian Sports	1. Wayne Dropulich; 2. Al Lackovic	4,166	0.33	+0.33
Smokers Rights	1. Max Katz-Barber; 2. Daniel Di Rado	3,609	0.28	+0.28
Democrats	1. Chris Fernandez; 2. William Thiel	3,492	0.27	−0.11
Stable Population	1. Peter Strachan; 2. William Bourke	3,063	0.24	+0.24
Outdoor Recreation	1. David Fishlock; 2. Joaquim De Lima	2,753	0.22	+0.22
Democratic Labour	1. Adrian Good; 2. Cathy Kiernan	2,727	0.21	+0.21
Rise Up Australia	1. Jane Foreman; 2. Joanne Bennett	2,224	0.17	+0.17
Katter's Australian	1. Phillip Bouwman; 2. Susan Hoddinott	1,182	0.09	+0.09
Building Australia	1. Ken Bezant; 2. Daniel Smee	1,047	0.08	+0.08
Australian Voice	1. Brian Parkes; 2. Sean Butler	1,002	0.08	+0.08
Secular	1. Simon Cuthbert; 2. Andrew Thompson	950	0.07	−0.01
Socialist Alliance	1. Alex Bainbridge; 2. Chris Jenkins	818	0.06	+0.06
Mutual Party	1. Anthony Fels; 2. Felly Chandra	842	0.07	+0.07
Freedom and Prosperity Party	1. Bill Koutalianos; 2. Leon Ashby	837	0.07	−0.09
Republican	1. Marcus Anderson; 2. Rohan Hollick	743	0.06	+0.06
Independent	Teresa van Lieshout	169	0.01	+0.01
Independent	Kim Mubarak	109	0.01	0.01
Total formal votes		1,277,804	97.50	
Informal votes		32,757	2.50	
Turnout		1,310,561	88.50	

Elected	#	Senator	Party
2014	1	David Johnston	Liberal
2014	2	Joe Bullock	Labor
2014	3	Scott Ludlam	Greens
2014	4	Michaelia Cash	Liberal
2014	5	Dio Wang	Palmer
2014	6	Linda Reynolds	Liberal
2010
2010	1	Mathias Cormann	Liberal
2010	2	Chris Evans	Labor
2010	3	Chris Back	Liberal
2010	4	Glenn Sterle	Labor
2010	5	Judith Adams	Liberal
2010	6	Rachel Siewert	Greens

The sixth and last seat was a close contest between third Liberal candidate Linda Reynolds and second Labor candidate Louise Pratt. Reynolds was ahead in the ABC's detailed count projection, with Antony Green predicting on 10 April "It is clear the Liberals will win the last seat". The result was confirmed by the Electoral Commission on 29 April. The score at the final count was 188,169 to Reynolds versus 176,042 for Pratt, a margin of 12,127. The projected margin on Green's calculator, which treated all votes as above-the-line, was a narrower 8,109.

==== 2013 ====
2013 Australian federal election: Senate, Western Australia
Party	Candidate	Votes	%	±%
Quota		187,183		
Liberal	1. David Johnston (elected 1); 2. Michaelia Cash (elected 3); 3. Linda Reynolds (elected 4); 4. Slade Brockman; 5. Steve Thomas; 6. Chris Oughton	513,639	39.20	−3.79
Labor	1. Joe Bullock (elected 2); 2. Louise Pratt; 3. Peter Foster; 4. Suliman Ali	348,401	26.59	−3.11
Greens	1. Scott Ludlam (elected 6); 2. Kate Davis; 3. Adam Duncan	124,354	9.49	−4.47
National	1. David Wirrpanda; 2. David Eagles	66,421	5.07	+1.64
Palmer United	1. Dio Wang; 2. Chamonix Terblanche	65,595	5.01	+5.01
Liberal Democrats	1. Jim Fryar; 2. Neil Hamilton	44,902	3.43	+2.25
Christians	1. Jamie Van Burgel; 2. Justin Moseley	21,499	1.64	+1.64
Sex Party	1. Steve Palmer; 2. Mark Coleman	19,519	1.49	−0.76
HEMP	1. Michael Balderstone; 2. Tayla Moylan	13,973	1.07	+1.07
Shooters and Fishers	1. Murray Bow; 1. John Parkes	13,622	1.04	+0.44
Wikileaks	1. Gerry Georgatos; 2. Suresh Rajan	9,767	0.75	+0.75
Animal Justice	1. Katrina Love; 2. Alicia Sutton	9,720	0.74	+0.74
Family First	1. Linda Rose; 2. Henry Heng	8,783	0.67	−0.48
Smokers Rights	1. Max Katz-Barber; 2. Daniel Di Rado	8,719	0.67	+0.67
Motoring Enthusiasts	1. Richie Howlett; 2. Sharon Young	7,748	0.59	+0.59
Fishing and Lifestyle	1. Jay Edwards; 2. Ross Finlayson	5,729	0.44	+0.44
Australian Independents	1. Daryl Higgins; 2. Patricia Irving	4,041	0.31	+0.31
Katter's Australian	1. Anthony Fels; 2. Susan Hoddinott	3,909	0.30	+0.30
Rise Up Australia	1. Jane Foreman; 2. Joanne Bennett	3,861	0.29	+0.29
Democrats	1. Chris Fernandez; 2. William Thiel	3,841	0.29	−0.09
Sports Party	1. Wayne Dropulich (elected 5); 2. Al Lackovic	2,997	0.23	+0.23
Outdoor Recreation	1. David Fishlock; 2. Kim Kinninmont	2,215	0.17	+0.17
Secular	1. Edward Atkins; 2. Simon Cuthbert	1,486	0.11	+0.03
Climate Sceptics	1. Adrian Byass; 2. Heather Dewar	1,481	0.11	−0.05
Stable Population	1. Peter Strachan; 2. John Banks	1,352	0.10	+0.10
Socialist Equality	1. Peter Symonds; 2. Joe Lopez	1,143	0.09	+0.09
Australian Voice	1. Brian Parkes; 2. Sean Butler	1,139	0.09	+0.09
One Nation	Robert Farmer	422	0.03	+0.03
Total formal votes		1,310,278	97.14	+0.32
Informal votes		38,519	2.86	−0.32
Turnout		1,348,797	92.77	−0.78

Elected	#	Senator	Party
2013	1	David Johnston	Liberal
2013	2	Joe Bullock	Labor
2013	3	Michaelia Cash	Liberal
2013	4	Linda Reynolds	Liberal
2013	5	Wayne Dropulich	Sports
2013	6	Scott Ludlam	Greens
2010
2010	1	Mathias Cormann	Liberal
2010	2	Chris Evans	Labor
2010	3	Chris Back	Liberal
2010	4	Glenn Sterle	Labor
2010	5	Judith Adams	Liberal
2010	6	Rachel Siewert	Greens

==== 2010 ====
2010 Australian federal election: Senate, Western Australia
Party	Candidate	Votes	%	±%
Quota		176,318		
Liberal	1. Mathias Cormann (elected 1); 2. Chris Back (elected 3); 3. Judith Adams (elected 5); 4. Jane Mouritz; 5. Jonathan Huston	530,583	42.99	−3.23
Labor	1. Chris Evans (elected 2); 2. Glenn Sterle (elected 4); 3. Wendy Perdon; 4. Peter MacFarlane	366,580	29.70	−6.30
Greens	1. Rachel Siewert (elected 6); 2. Kado Muir; 3. Christine Cunningham	172,327	13.96	+4.66
National	1. John McCourt; 2. Ronnie Fleay; 3. Michael Rose	42,334	3.43	+1.99
Sex Party	1. Justine Martin; 2. Mark Coleman	27,795	2.25	+2.25
Christian Democrats	1. Trevor Young; 2. Lachlan Dunjey	22,206	1.80	+0.04
Liberal Democrats	1. Mark Walmsley; 2. Mark Dixon	14,517	1.18	+1.13
Family First	1. Linda Rose; 2. Steve Fuhrmann	14,254	1.15	+0.29
Democratic Labor	1. Elaine McNeill; 2. Joe Nardizzi	9,346	0.76	−0.19
One Nation	1. Craig Bradshaw; 2. Bill Cook	7,610	0.62	−0.35
Shooters and Fishers	1. Paul Peake; 2. Christine Peake	7,459	0.60	+0.60
Democrats	1. Paul Young; 2. Matthew Corica	4,730	0.38	−0.67
	1. Anthony Fels; 2. Felly Chandra	3,447	0.28	+0.28
Climate Sceptics	1. Beau Woods; 2. Heather Dewar	2,010	0.16	+0.16
Carers Alliance	1. Julie Gilmore; 2. Aileen Polain	1,641	0.13	+0.00
WA First	1. Scott Cowans; 2. John Goodlad; 3. James Versteegen	1,464	0.12	+0.12
Socialist Alliance	1. Ben Peterson; 2. Julie Gray	1,268	0.10	+0.02
Citizens Electoral Council	1. Judy Sudholz; 2. Stuart Smith	1,231	0.10	+0.02
Secular	1. Guy Curtis; 2. Andrew Thompson	1,007	0.08	+0.08
	1. Paddy Embry; 2. Juanita Finnegan	988	0.08	+0.08
Ecology, Social Justice, Aboriginal	1. Gerry Georgatos; 2. Bill Hayward; 3. Marianne Mackay; 4. Lara Menkens	552	0.04	+0.04
Senator On-Line	1. Daniel Mayer; 2. Keturah Hoffman	504	0.04	−0.03
Independent	Rosemary Steineck	366	0.03	+0.03
Total formal votes		1,234,219	96.82	−0.76
Informal votes		40,490	3.18	+0.76
Turnout		1,274,709	93.55	−0.31

Elected	#	Senator	Party
2010	1	Mathias Cormann	Liberal
2010	2	Chris Evans	Labor
2010	3	Chris Back	Liberal
2010	4	Glenn Sterle	Labor
2010	5	Judith Adams	Liberal
2010	6	Rachel Siewert	Greens
2007
2007	1	David Johnston	Liberal
2007	2	Louise Pratt	Labor
2007	3	Alan Eggleston	Liberal
2007	4	Mark Bishop	Labor
2007	5	Michaelia Cash	Liberal
2007	6	Scott Ludlam	Greens

The primary vote saw the Liberals winning three seats and Labor winning two, leaving the Greens with a very comfortable majority against the Nationals and the Sex Party. Socialist Alliance and Labor preferences saw the Greens easily reach the quota.

=== Elections in the 2000s ===
==== 2007 ====
Elected	#	Senator	Party
2007	1	David Johnston	Liberal
2007	2	Louise Pratt	Labor
2007	3	Alan Eggleston	Liberal
2007	4	Mark Bishop	Labor
2007	5	Michaelia Cash	Liberal
2007	6	Scott Ludlam	Greens
2001
2004	1	Chris Ellison	Liberal
2004	2	Chris Evans	Labor
2004	3	Ian Campbell	Liberal
2004	4	Glenn Sterle	Labor
2004	5	Judith Adams	Liberal
2004	6	Rachel Siewert	Greens

2007 Australian federal election: Senate, Western Australia
Party	Candidate	Votes	%	±%
Quota		171,822		
Liberal	1. David Johnston (elected 1); 2. Alan Eggleston (elected 3); 3. Michaelia Cash (elected 5); 4. Michael Mischin; 5. Jane Mouritz; 6. Matt Brown	555,868	46.22	−3.12
Labor	1. Louise Pratt (elected 2); 2. Mark Bishop (elected 4); 3. Ruth Webber	433,046	36.00	+3.48
Greens	1. Scott Ludlam (elected 6); 2. Alison Xamon; 3. Brenda Roy	111,813	9.30	+1.24
Christian Democrats	1. Gerard Goiran; 2. Peter Watt	21,179	1.76	−0.12
National	1. Tony Crook; 2. Wendy Duncan	17,365	1.44	+0.58
Democrats	1. Erica Lewin; 2. Rob Olver; 3. Don Hoddy	12,604	1.05	−0.95
One Nation	1. James Hopkinson; 2. Ron McLean	11,623	0.97	−1.48
Democratic Labor	1. Bob Boulger; 2. Eric Miller	11,390	0.95	+0.95
Family First	1. Linda Rose; 2. Cathie Fabian; 3. Steve Fuhrmann	10,341	0.86	+0.01
What Women Want	1. Meryki Basden; 2. Saywood Lane	3,533	0.29	+0.29
Climate Change	1. Gary Warden; 2. Sarah Bishop	3,461	0.29	+0.29
Group P	1. Graeme Campbell; 2. John Fischer; 3. Russell Graham; 4. Geoff Gibson	1,621	0.13	+0.13
Carers Alliance	1. Thomas Hoyer; 2. Shirley Primeau	1,571	0.13	+0.13
Climate Conservatives	1. Gerard Kettle; 2. Shirley Anton	1,569	0.13	+0.13
Citizens Electoral Council	1. Jean Robinson; 2. Stuart Smith	1,002	0.08	−0.11
Non-Custodial Parents	1. Geoff Dixon; 2. Mike Ward	946	0.08	−0.07
Socialist Alliance	1. Trent Hawkins; 2. Julie Gray	928	0.08	+0.08
Senator On-Line	1. Daniel Mayer; 2. Zoe Lamont	824	0.07	+0.07
Group M	1. Eric Wynne; 2. Kevin Fitzgerald	819	0.07	+0.07
Liberty & Democracy	1. Peter Whelan; 2. Daniel Parker	591	0.05	+0.05
Independent	Richard McNaught	291	0.02	+0.02
Secular	1. Jennifer Armstrong; 2. Michael Tan	271	0.02	+0.02
Independent	Edward Dabrowski	94	0.01	+0.01
Total formal votes		1,202,750	97.58	+1.12
Informal votes		29,797	2.42	−1.12
Turnout		1,232,547	93.86	+0.20

Unlike in other states, the Liberal Party of Australia and Nationals were not on a joint ticket. However, the Liberals finished far ahead of Labor in the primary vote with a 10% margin between them. The Greens finished with over 9% of the vote. The Liberals won three seats on primary vote alone whilst Labor won two. After these seats were distributed, the Greens were ahead of all parties. The Democratic Labor Party distributed preferences to the Christian Democrats, allowing them to go ahead of the Liberal party. Preferences from the Liberal Party allowed the Christian Democrats to go ahead of Labor and narrowly behind the Greens. However, preferences from Labor led to Greens candidate Scott Ludlam winning the final seat. The end result was three seats to the Liberals, two to Labor and one to the Greens

==== 2004 ====
Elected	#	Senator	Party
2004	1	Chris Ellison	Liberal
2004	2	Chris Evans	Labor
2004	3	Ian Campbell	Liberal
2004	4	Glenn Sterle	Labor
2004	5	Judith Adams	Liberal
2004	6	Rachel Siewert	Greens
2001
2001	1	Alan Eggleston	Liberal
2001	2	Mark Bishop	Labor
2001	3	David Johnston	Liberal
2001	4	Ruth Webber	Labor
2001	5	Ross Lightfoot	Liberal
2001	6	Andrew Murray	Democrats

2004 Australian federal election: Senate, Western Australia
Party	Candidate	Votes	%	±%
Quota		161,166		
Liberal	1. Chris Ellison (elected 1); 2. Ian Campbell (elected 3); 3. Judith Adams (elected 5); 4. Michelle Steck	556,558	49.34	+9.21
Labor	1. Chris Evans (elected 2); 2. Glenn Sterle (elected 4); 3. Emiliano Barzotto	366,825	32.52	−1.63
Greens	1. Rachel Siewert (elected 6); 2. Colin Hughes; 3. Christopher Newall; 4. Felicity Peterson	90,956	8.06	+2.21
One Nation	1. James Hopkinson; 2. Ron McLean	27,601	2.45	−4.58
Democrats	1. Brian Greig; 2. Dominika Lisowski; 3. Jason Meotti	22,603	2.00	−3.86
Christian Democrats	1. Lachlan Dunjey; 2. Peter Watt; 3. Norman Gage	21,234	1.88	+0.63
National	1. Geoff Gill; 2. Norm Henning	9,699	0.86	−1.49
Family First	1. Nigel Irvine; 2. Don Hatch	9,553	0.85	+0.85
Liberals for Forests	1. Lesley McKay; 2. Vicki Taylor	5,680	0.50	−0.92
Progressive Labour	1. Mary Lupi; 2. Lyn Kearsley	5,249	0.47	−0.22
Group A	1. Alicia Curtis; 2. Steven Ogle	4,122	0.37	+0.37
Citizens Electoral Council	1. Jean Robertson; 2. Stuart Smith	2,098	0.19	+0.08
New Country	1. Mal Harrington; 2. Brendan Mansell	1,981	0.18	+0.18
Non-Custodial Parents	1. Brian Taylor; 2. Geoff Dixon	1,741	0.15	+0.15
Progressive Alliance	1. Geoff Gibson; 2. Stephen Crabbe	932	0.08	+0.08
Independent	Julie Easton	1,015	0.09	+0.09
Independent	Jim Jardine	146	0.01	+0.01
Independent	Alexander Marsden	132	0.01	+0.01
Total formal votes		1,128,155	96.46	+0.35
Informal votes		41,452	3.54	−0.04
Turnout		1,169,607	93.66	−1.38

Primary votes saw three Liberal and two Labor senators get elected, leaving the Greens with a sizeable lead against the Liberals. Preferences from the Democrats and Labor saw that lead extended even further, and Greens candidate Rachel Siewert comfortably took the final vacancy. The result was three seats Liberal, two seats Labor and one seat Greens.

==== 2001 ====
Elected	#	Senator	Party
2001	1	Alan Eggleston	Liberal
2001	2	Mark Bishop	Labor
2001	3	David Johnston	Liberal
2001	4	Ruth Webber	Labor
2001	5	Ross Lightfoot	Liberal
2001	6	Andrew Murray	Democrats
1998
1998	1	Chris Ellison	Liberal
1998	2	Peter Cook	Labor
1998	3	Ian Campbell	Liberal
1998	4	Chris Evans	Labor
1998	5	Brian Greig	Democrats
1998	6	Sue Knowles	Liberal

2001 Australian federal election: Senate, Western Australia
Party	Candidate	Votes	%	±%
Quota		157,933		
Liberal	1. Alan Eggleston (elected 1); 2. David Johnston (elected 3); 3. Ross Lightfoot (elected 5); 4. Winston Crane; 5. Kim Keogh; 6. Nigel Hallett	443,597	40.13	+1.7
Labor	1. Mark Bishop (elected 2); 2. Ruth Webber (elected 4); 3. Mark Cuomo; 4. Gavin Waugh	377,547	34.15	−0.4
One Nation	1. Graeme Campbell; 2. Gerry Kenworthy; 3. Marye Daniels; 4. Peter David	77,757	7.03	−3.0
Democrats	1. Andrew Murray (elected 6); 2. Helen Hodgson; 3. Damian Meyer	64,773	5.86	−0.5
Greens	1. Rachel Siewert; 2. Lee Bell; 3. Paul Smith; 4. Jenna Zed	64,736	5.86	+0.2
National	1. Hendy Cowan; 2. Margaret Day	26,015	2.35	+1.2
Liberals for Forests	1. Liz Davenport; 2. Arthur Harris	15,646	1.42	+1.4
Christian Democrats	1. Justin Moseley; 2. Kerry Watterson	13,809	1.25	+0.4
Progressive Labour	1. Eddie Hwang; 2. Nicholas Chin	7,667	0.69	+0.7
Group A	1. Jim Dalton; 2. Kate Dalton	4,495	0.41	+0.4
Curtin Labor Alliance	1. Adrian Bennett; 2. June Bennett	3,494	0.32	+0.3
Group B	1. Geoff Taylor; 2. Henry Sheil	1,631	0.15	+0.2
Citizens Electoral Council	1. Jean Robertson; 2. John Watson	1,243	0.11	+0.0
Unity	1. Eddie Hwang; 2. Nicholas Chin	811	0.07	−1.0
Independent	Jennifer Lee	804	0.07	+0.1
Taxi Operators	1. Alan Bateson; 2. Ramon Kennedy	670	0.06	+0.06
Group K	1. Frank Nesci; 2. Renu Schneider	532	0.05	+0.05
Group M	1. Clarrie Isaacs; 2. Daniel Watson	302	0.03	+0.03
Total formal votes		1,105,529	96.42	−0.63
Informal votes		41,025	3.58	+0.63
Turnout		1,146,554	95.04	−0.78

=== Elections in the 1990s ===
==== 1998 ====
Elected	#	Senator	Party
1998
1998	1	Chris Ellison	Liberal
1998	2	Peter Cook	Labor
1998	3	Ian Campbell	Liberal
1998	4	Chris Evans	Labor
1998	5	Brian Greig	Democrats
1998	6	Sue Knowles	Liberal
1996
1996	1	Winston Crane	Liberal
1996	2	Jim McKiernan	Labor
1996	3	Ross Lightfoot	Liberal
1996	4	Mark Bishop	Labor
1996	5	Alan Eggleston	Liberal
1996	6	Andrew Murray	Democrats

1998 Australian federal election: Senate, Western Australia
Party	Candidate	Votes	%	±%
Quota		151,974		
Liberal	1. Chris Ellison (elected 1); 2. Ian Campbell (elected 3); 3. Sue Knowles (elected 6); 4. Ivan Ivankovic	408,696	38.2	−7.6
Labor	1. Peter Cook (elected 2); 2. Chris Evans (elected 4); 3. Rhonda Griffiths; 4. Sue Ellery; 5. Lois Anderson; 6. Chilip Foo	368,821	34.7	+0.7
One Nation	1. John Fischer; 2. Colin Tincknell; 3. Martin Suter	110,231	10.4	+10.4
Democrats	1. Brian Greig (elected 5); 2. Stephen Crabbe; 3. Margot Clifford	68,057	6.4	−3.0
Greens	1. Dee Margetts; 2. Kayt Davies; 3. Alison Xamon	61,029	5.7	0.0
National	1. Beryle Morgan; 2. Dudley Maslen	13,428	1.3	−0.8
Christian Democrats	1. Justin Moseley; 2. Peter Johnson	10,258	1.0	+0.3
Group N	1. Kate Hobbs; 2. Morris Bessant	4,274	0.4	+0.4
Democratic Socialist	1. Sarah Stephen; 2. Roberto Jorquera	4,237	0.4	+0.4
Shooters	1. Raymond Motteram; 2. Ken Taylor	3,751	0.3	+0.3
Unity	1. Ted Wilkes; 2. Mai-Yie Leung; 3. Michael Carey	2,270	0.2	+0.2
Abolish Child Support	1. Brendan Griffin; 2. Sam Johnson	1,940	0.2	+0.2
Citizens Electoral Council	1. Tony Drake; 2. Jean Robinson	1,496	0.1	+0.1
Group O	1. Joan Torr; 2. Roger Pratt	1,206	0.1	+0.1
Republican	1. Michael O'Donnell; 2. Kerry McNally	1,023	0.1	+0.1
Taxi Operators	1. Alan Bateson; 2. Rick Finney	549	0.1	+0.1
Independent	Rod Garcia	385	0.0	0.0
Total formal votes		1,063,811	97.3	+0.8
Informal votes		29,352	2.7	−0.8
Turnout		1,093,163	95.8	+0.2

==== 1996 ====
Elected	#	Senator	Party
1996
1996	1	Winston Crane	Liberal
1996	2	Jim McKiernan	Labor
1996	3	John Panizza	Liberal
1996	4	Mark Bishop	Labor
1996	5	Alan Eggleston	Liberal
1996	6	Andrew Murray	Democrats
1993
1993	1	Sue Knowles	Liberal
1993	2	Peter Cook	Labor
1993	3	Ian Campbell	Liberal
1993	4	Chris Evans	Labor
1993	5	Chris Ellison	Liberal
1993	6	Dee Margetts	Greens

1996 Australian federal election: Senate, Western Australia
Party	Candidate	Votes	%	±%
Quota		143,472		
Liberal	1. Winston Crane (elected 1); 2. John Panizza (elected 3); 3. Alan Eggleston (elected 5); 4. Michael Huston; 5. Enzo Sirna; 6. Clare Thompson	460,379	45.8	−2.6
Labor	1. Jim McKiernan elected 2); 2. Mark Bishop (elected 4); 3. Michael Beahan; 4. Catherine Crawford	341,580	34.1	−4.1
Democrats	1. Andrew Murray (elected 6); 2. Don Millar; 3. Shirley de la Hunty	93,937	9.4	+5.3
Greens	1. Christabel Chamarette; 2. Robin Chapple	57,006	5.7	+0.1
National	1. Kevin McAnuff; 2. Lynley Anderson	20,877	2.0	+0.3
AAFI	1. Richard Haye; 2. Robert Hammond	12,642	1.2	+1.2
Women's Party	1. Mattie Turnbull; 2. Kate Mudford	11,169	1.1	+1.1
Call to Australia	1. Don Jackson; 2. Marj Laurie	7,028	0.7	−0.5
Group C	1. Tony Drake; 2. Jean Robinson	1,518	0.1	+0.1
Independent	Craig Bradshaw	1,023	0.1	+0.1
Natural Law	Ros White	414	0.0	−0.3
Independent	Vin Cooper	376	0.0	0.0
Independent	Craig Mackintosh	346	0.0	0.0
Total formal votes		1,004,299	96.5	−1.4
Informal votes		36,369	3.5	+1.4
Turnout		1,040,668	95.6	−0.3

==== 1993 ====
Elected	#	Senator	Party
1993	1	Sue Knowles	Liberal
1993	2	Peter Cook	Labor
1993	3	Ian Campbell	Liberal
1993	4	Chris Evans	Labor
1993	5	Chris Ellison	Liberal
1993	6	Dee Margetts	Greens
1990	1	Noel Crichton-Browne	Liberal
1990	2	Jim McKiernan	Labor
1990	3	John Panizza	Liberal
1990	4	Michael Beahan	Labor
1990	5	Winston Crane	Liberal
1990	6	Jo Vallentine	Greens

1993 Australian federal election: Senate, Western Australia
Party	Candidate	Votes	%	±%
Quota		139,397		
Liberal	1. Sue Knowles (elected 1); 2. Ian Campbell (elected 3); 3. Chris Ellison (elected 5); 4. Maurice Brockwell; 5. Enzo Sirna; 6. John McCausland	472,131	48.3	+5.0
Labor	1. Peter Cook (elected 2); 2. Chris Evans (elected 4); 3. Mark Bishop; 4. Neil Roberts	373,247	38.3	+4.7
Greens	1. Dee Margetts (elected 6); 2. Chris Williams	53,757	5.6	−2.8
Democrats	1. Jean Jenkins; 2. Helen Hodgson	39,849	4.0	−5.3
National	1. Michael Jardine; 2. Paul Clune; 3. David Lee	17,075	1.7	−1.2
Call to Australia	1. Don Rogers; 2. Beryl Rogers	11,568	1.2	+1.2
Natural Law	1. Michael King; 2. Philip Jackson; 3. Jody Fitzhardinge; 4. Peter Coppin	3,569	0.3	+0.3
Republican	1. David Langley; 2. Rodney Stratton	1,519	0.2	+0.2
Group J	1. Frank Nesci; 2. Paul Nesci	953	0.1	+0.1
Citizens Electoral Council	1. John Seale; 2. Laurence Molloy	876	0.1	+0.1
Independent	Rick Finney	549	0.1	+0.1
Grey Power	Salli Vaughan	245	0.0	−1.0
Independent	John Tucak	226	0.0	0.0
Confederate Action	Roland Richardson	208	0.0	0.0
Total formal votes		975,772	97.9	+0.8
Informal votes		20,983	2.1	−0.8
Turnout		996,755	95.9	+0.8

==== 1990 ====
Elected	#	Senator	Party
1990
1990	1	Noel Crichton-Browne	Liberal
1990	2	Jim McKiernan	Labor
1990	3	John Panizza	Liberal
1990	4	Michael Beahan	Labor
1990	5	Winston Crane	Liberal
1990	6	Jo Vallentine	WA Greens
1987
1987	1	Peter Walsh	Labor
1987	2	Ian Campbell	Liberal
1987	3	Patricia Giles	Labor
1987	4	Peter Durack	Liberal
1987	5	Peter Cook	Labor
1987	6	Sue Knowles	Liberal

1990 Australian federal election: Senate, Western Australia
Party	Candidate	Votes	%	±%
Quota		129,729		
Liberal	1. Noel Crichton-Browne (elected 1); 2. John Panizza (elected 3); 3. Winston Crane (elected 5); 4. Bernie Masters	392,820	43.3	+4.2
Labor	1. Jim McKiernan (elected 2); 2. Michael Beahan (elected 4); 3. Mark Bishop; 4. John Cowdell	304,632	33.5	−9.6
Democrats	1. Jean Jenkins; 2. Richard Jeffreys; 3. Barbara Churchward	85,324	9.4	+3.7
Greens WA	1. Jo Vallentine (elected 6); 2. Christabel Bridge; 3. Gladys Yarran	76,381	8.4	+3.6
National	1. Michael Jardine; 2. Brian English; 3. Josephine Walton	26,801	3.0	−2.5
Grey Power	1. Doug Ratcliffe; 2. Jack Webb	8,781	1.0	+1.0
Democratic Socialist	1. Catherine Brown; 2. Kylie Budge	4,883	0.5	+0.5
Conservative	1. Brady Williams; 2. Charles Bussell; 3. Laurence Molloy	2,967	0.3	+0.3
Pensioner	1. Maureen Grierson; 2. Gordon Munn	2,788	0.3	+0.3
Independent	Phillip Achurch	1,040	0.1	+0.1
Independent	Mitchell Faircloth	958	0.1	+0.1
Independent	Barbara Stark	514	0.1	+0.1
Independent	Ted Quinlan	209	0.0	0.0
Total formal votes		908,098	97.1	+0.4
Informal votes		26,733	2.9	−0.4
Turnout		934,831	95.1	+0.7

=== Elections in the 1980s ===
==== 1987 ====
1987 Australian federal election: Senate, Western Australia
Party	Candidate	Votes	%	±%
Quota		63,668		
Labor	1. Peter Walsh (elected 1); 2. Patricia Giles (elected 3); 3. Peter Cook (elected 5); 4. Jim McKiernan (elected 7); 5. Michael Beahan (elected 9); 6. Chris Evans; 7. Ed Dermer	354,328	42.8	−0.5
Liberal	1. Fred Chaney (elected 2); 2. Peter Durack (elected 4); 3. Sue Knowles (elected 6); 4. Noel Crichton-Browne (elected 8); 5. John Panizza (elected 10); 6. Alan Eggleston; 7. Cam Tinley	324,028	39.1	−1.6
Democrats	1. Jean Jenkins (elected 11); 2. Jack Evans	47,534	5.7	+1.1
National	1. James MacDonald; 2. Glenice Sanders; 3. Ron Aitkenhead; 4. Beverley Poor	45,787	5.5	+3.7
Vallentine Peace Group	1. Jo Vallentine (elected 12); 2. Louise Duxbury	40,048	4.8	+4.8
One Australia Movement	1. Cedric Jacobs; 2. Don Jackson; 3. Ed Robertson	13,063	1.6	+1.6
Unite Australia	1. Allan McMullen; 2. Norm Heslington	1,620	0.2	+0.2
Independent	Frank Nesci	426	0.1	+0.1
Independent	Mark Pallister	354	0.0	0.0
Independent	Jack Flanigan	333	0.0	0.0
Independent	Gordon McColl	162	0.0	0.0
Total formal votes		827,683	96.7	+1.4
Informal votes		28,284	3.3	−1.4
Turnout		855,976	94.4	+0.2

#	Senator	Party
1	Peter Walsh	Labor
2	Fred Chaney	Liberal
3	Patricia Giles	Labor
4	Peter Durack	Liberal
5	Peter Cook	Labor
6	Sue Knowles	Liberal
7	Jim McKiernan	Labor
8	Noel Crichton-Browne	Liberal
9	Michael Beahan	Labor
10	John Panizza	Liberal
11	Jean Jenkins	Democrats
12	Jo Vallentine	VPG

==== 1984 ====
Elected	#	Senator	Party
1985
1985	1	Patricia Giles	Labor
1985	2	Noel Crichton-Browne	Liberal
1985	3	Peter Cook	Labor
1985	4	Reg Withers	Liberal
1985	5	Jim McKiernan	Labor
1985	6	Sue Knowles	Liberal
1985	7	Jo Vallentine	NDP
1982
1982	1	Peter Walsh	Labor
1982	2	Fred Chaney	Liberal
1982	3	Ruth Coleman	Labor
1982	4	Peter Durack	Liberal
1982	5	Gordon McIntosh	Labor

1984 Australian federal election: Senate, Western Australia
Party	Candidate	Votes	%	±%
Quota		96,467		
Labor	1. Patricia Giles (elected 1); 2. Peter Cook (elected 3); 3. Jim McKiernan (elected 5); 4. John Crouch	334,371	43.3	−6.0
Liberal	1. Noel Crichton-Browne (elected 2); 2. Reg Withers (elected 4); 3. Sue Knowles (elected 6); 4. Murray Nixon	313,738	40.7	−0.3
Nuclear Disarmament	1. Jo Vallentine (elected 7); 2. Lindsay Matthews	52,365	6.8	+6.8
Democrats	1. Jack Evans; 2. Richard Jeffreys; 3. Jean Jenkins	37,369	4.8	−2.0
Family Movement	1. Brian Peachey; 2. Beryl Van Lyn; 3. Nellie Clark; 4. John Gilmour; 5. Kenneth Wright; 6. Roland Bott	18,041	2.3	+2.3
National	1. Bruce Currie; 2. Eric Blight; 3. Mort Schell; 4. Graham Barrett-Lennard	13,739	1.7	+0.6
Group E	1. Frank Nesci; 2. Nellie Stuart	1,033	0.1	+0.1
Independent	Peter van Tongeren	861	0.1	+0.1
Independent	Frank Ash	154	0.0	0.0
Independent	Martin Suter	62	0.0	0.0
Total formal votes		771,733	95.3	+3.1
Informal votes		37,739	4.7	−3.1
Turnout		809,472	94.2	+1.2

==== 1983 ====
1983 Australian federal election: Senate, Western Australia
Party	Candidate	Votes	%	±%
Quota		62,279		
Labor	1. Peter Walsh (elected 1); 2. Ruth Coleman (elected 3); 3. Gordon McIntosh (elected 5); 4. Patricia Giles (elected 7); 5. Peter Cook (elected 9); 6. Jim McKiernan	337,417	49.4	+10.6
Liberal	1. Fred Chaney (elected 2); 2. Peter Durack (elected 4); 3. Noel Crichton-Browne (elected 6); 4. Reg Withers (elected 8); 5. Andrew Thomas; 6. John Martyr	280,878	41.2	−4.7
Democrats	1. Jack Evans (elected 10); 2. Shirley de la Hunty; 3. Richard Jeffreys; 4. James Anderson	46,626	6.8	−2.5
National	1. Albert Llewellyn; 2. John Sattler; 3. Rodney Frost	7,689	1.1	−3.0
Socialist Workers	1. Anthony Forward; 2. Peter Holloway	5,452	0.8	+0.8
National	1. Murray Anderson; 2. Edna Adams; 3. Donald Bannister	3,894	0.6	−0.6
Group H	1. Robin Linke; 2. Charles Lee	1,779	0.2	+0.2
Group I	1. Francesco Nesci; 2. Nellie Stuart	725	0.1	+0.1
Social Democrats	1. Richard Savage; 2. Kerry Stevens	598	0.1	+0.1
Total formal votes		685,058	92.2	+2.1
Informal votes		58,257	7.8	−2.1
Turnout		743,315	93.0	−0.2

#	Senator	Party
1	Peter Walsh	Labor
2	Fred Chaney	Liberal
3	Ruth Coleman	Labor
4	Peter Durack	Liberal
5	Gordon McIntosh	Labor
6	Noel Crichton-Browne	Liberal
7	Patricia Giles	Labor
8	Reg Withers	Liberal
9	Peter Cook	Labor
10	Jack Evans	Democrat

==== 1980 ====
Elected	#	Senator	Party
1981
1981	1	Reg Withers	Liberal
1981	2	Gordon McIntosh	Labor
1981	3	Peter Durack	Liberal
1981	4	Patricia Giles	Labor
1981	5	Noel Crichton-Browne	Liberal
1978
1978	1	Fred Chaney	Liberal
1978	2	Peter Walsh	Labor
1978	3	Andrew Thomas	Liberal
1978	4	Ruth Coleman	Labor
1978	5	Allan Rocher	Liberal

1980 Australian federal election: Senate, Western Australia
Party	Candidate	Votes	%	±%
Quota		105,085		
Liberal	1. Reg Withers (elected 1); 2. Peter Durack (elected 3); 3. Noel Crichton-Browne (elected 5)	283,429	45.0	−1.4
Labor	1. Gordon McIntosh (elected 2); 2. Patricia Giles (elected 4); 3. Brian Conway	244,729	38.8	+6.0
Democrats	1. Jack Evans; 2. Geoffrey Taylor; 3. Shirley de la Hunty	58,538	9.3	−3.2
National Country	1. John Patterson; 2. John McIntyre; 3. Leonard Newing	25,937	4.1	−2.0
National	1. Anthony Overheu; 2. Edna Adams; 3. Murray Anderson	7,597	1.2	+1.2
Progressive Conservative	1. Syd Negus; 2. Peter Harwood	4,999	0.8	+0.8
Progress	1. John Trewick; 2. James Jamieson; 3. Kenneth Law	2,593	0.4	−1.3
Group D	1. Francesco Nesci; 2. Nellie Stuart	1,570	0.2	+0.2
Independent	Douglas Thorp	1,112	0.2	+0.2
Total formal votes		630,504	90.1	−1.7
Informal votes		69,453	9.9	+1.7
Turnout		699,957	93.2	−0.8

=== Elections in the 1960s ===
==== 1966 ====
1966 Australian federal election: Senate special, Western Australia
Party	Candidate	Votes	%	±%
Quota		121,862		
Liberal	1. Peter Sim (re-elected 1); 2. Reg Withers (defeated); 3. Victor Garland	161,625	44.21	
Labor	1. Laurie Wilkinson (elected 2); 2. John Henshaw	152,809	41.80	
Democratic Labor	1. Mark Briffa; 2. Lydia Obbes	40,272	11.02	
Independent	1. Frederick Simpson; 2. John Huelin	10,877	2.98	
Total formal votes		365,583	89.26	
Informal votes		43,987	10.74	
Turnout		409,570	94.57	

=== Elections in the 1910s ===
==== 1914 ====
Each elector voted for up to six candidates. Percentages refer to the number of voters rather than the number of votes.

1914 Australian federal election: Senate, Western Australia
Party	Candidate	Votes	%	±%
Labor	George Pearce (re-elected 1)	68,245	55.4	−0.2 (Note: Change compared to the personal vote at the 1913 election.)
Labor	Patrick Lynch (re-elected 2)	66,189	53.7	−0.4
Labor	Ted Needham (re-elected 3)	65,960	53.5	−0.5
Labor	George Henderson (re-elected 4)	65,632	53.3	−2.4 (Note: Change compared to the personal vote at the 1910 election.)
Labor	Richard Buzacott (re-elected 5)	65,303	53.0	−1.2
Labor	Hugh de Largie (re-elected 6)	64,452	52.3	+0.4
Liberal	William Butcher	61,288	49.7	+3.9
Liberal	William Dempster	58,208	47.2	
Liberal	George Throssell	56,973	46.2	
Liberal	John Thomson	56,290	45.7	
Liberal	Victor Spencer	55,448	45.0	
Liberal	Charles North	55,164	44.8	
Total formal votes		739,152; 123,192 voters	94.67	+1.3
Informal votes		6,942	5.33	−0.91
Turnout		130,134	71.46	−2.04
Party total votes
Labor		395,781	53.55	−1.03
Liberal		343,371	46.45	+1.03

==== 1913 ====
Each elector voted for up to three candidates. Percentages refer to the number of voters rather than the number of votes.

1913 Australian federal election: Senate, Western Australia
Party	Candidate	Votes	%	±%
Labour	George Pearce (re-elected 1)	68,916	55.6	−3.1 (Note: Change compared to the personal vote at the 1906 election.)
Labour	Patrick Lynch (re-elected 2)	67,039	54.1	+7.1
Labour	Ted Needham (re-elected 3)	66,897	54.0	−0.8
Liberal	William Butcher	56,730	45.8	
Liberal	William Nairn	56,162	45.3	
Liberal	Charles Davies	55,950	45.2	
Total formal votes		371,694; 123,898 voters	93.8	−0.8
Informal votes		8,251	6.2	+0.8
Turnout		132,149	73.5	+11.3
Party total votes
Labour		202,852	54.6	+0.7
Liberal		168,842	45.4	−0.7

==== 1910 ====
Each elector voted for up to three candidates. Percentages refer to the number of voters rather than the number of votes.

1910 Australian federal election: Senate, Western Australia
Party	Candidate	Votes	%	±%
Labour	George Henderson (re-elected 1)	44,215	55.7	−3.4 (Note: Change compared to the personal vote at the 1903 election.)
Labour	Richard Buzacott (elected 2)	43,032	54.2	
Labour	Hugh de Largie (re-elected 3)	41,205	51.9	−11.2
Liberal	Walter Kingsmill	37,263	46.9	
Liberal	Archibald Sanderson	36,453	45.9	
Liberal	Nathaniel Harper	35,948	45.3	
Total formal votes		238,116; 79,372 voters	94.6	+1.3
Informal votes		4,544	5.4	−1.3
Turnout		83,916	62.2	+26.0
Party total votes
Labour		128,452	53.9	−1.6
Liberal		109,664	46.1	

=== Elections in the 1900s ===
==== 1906 ====
Each elector voted for up to three candidates. Percentages refer to the number of voters rather than the number of votes.

1906 Australian federal election: Senate, Western Australia
Party	Candidate	Votes	%	±%
Labour	George Pearce (re-elected 1)	28,852	58.7	
Labour	Ted Needham (elected 2)	26,938	54.8	
Labour	Patrick Lynch (elected 3)	26,270	47.0	
Western Australian Party	Henry Mills	23,121	47.0	
Western Australian Party	Charles Clarke	21,540	43.8	
Western Australian Party	Edward Wittenoom	20,765	42.2	
Total formal votes		147,486; 49,162 voters	93.3	
Informal votes		3,550	6.7	
Turnout		52,712	36.2	
Party total votes
Labour		82,060	55.6	
Western Australian Party		65,426	44.4	

==== 1903 ====
Each elector voted for up to three candidates. Percentages refer to the number of voters rather than the number of votes.

1903 Australian federal election: Senate, Western Australia
Party	Candidate	Votes	%	±%
Labour	Hugh de Largie (re-elected 1)	19,644	63.1	
Labour	George Henderson (elected 2)	18,414	59.1	
Labour	John Croft (elected 3)	17,464	56.1	
Free Trade	Henry Saunders (defeated)	9,979	32.0	
Protectionist	Michael Cavanagh	8,892	28.5	
Free Trade	William Martin	7,109	22.8	
Free Trade	Herbert Preston	6,126	19.7	
Protectionist	Samuel Moore	5,818	18.7	
Total formal votes		93,446; ~31,000 voters	≈98	
Informal votes		2,001	≈2	
Turnout		≈33000	≈27	
Party total votes
Labour		55,522	59.4	
Free Trade		23,214	24.8	
Protectionist		14,710	15.7	

==== 1901 ====
Each elector voted for up to six candidates; as such percentages are shown of the total number of voters rather than the total number of votes.

1901 Australian federal election: Senate, Western Australia
Party	Candidate	Votes	%	±%
Free Trade	Staniforth Smith (elected 1)	15,288	69.6	+69.6
Free Trade	Alexander Matheson (elected 2)	14,728	67.0	+67.0
Labour	George Pearce (elected 3)	13,109	59.6	+59.6
Labour	Hugh de Largie (elected 4)	12,648	57.5	+57.5
Free Trade	Edward Harney (elected 5)	11,475	52.2	+52.2
Free Trade	Norman Ewing (elected 6)	11,037	50.2	+50.2
Free Trade	Joseph Thomson	9,249	42.1	+42.1
Ind. Free Trade	Henry Saunders	8,951	40.7	+40.7
Ind. Free Trade	Henry Ellis	7,720	35.1	+35.1
Protectionist	John Phair	6,191	28.2	+28.2
Protectionist	Joseph Charles	5,016	22.8	+22.8
Ind. Free Trade	Horace Stirling	4,731	21.5	+21.5
Free Trade	Louis Wolff	3,729	17.0	+17.0
Ind. Free Trade	Richard Gell	3,548	16.1	+16.1
Ind. Free Trade	Walter Phillips	2,261	10.3	+10.3
Ind. Free Trade	Julius Bowen	2,184	9.9	+9.9
Total formal votes		131,865; ~21,978 ballots		
Informal votes		5,793		
Turnout		unknown		
Party total votes
Free Trade		65,506	49.7	+49.7
Ind. Free Trade		29,395	22.3	+22.3
Labour		25,757	19.5	+19.5
Protectionist		11,207	8.5	+8.5

== See also ==
- List of senators from Western Australia
