= Members of the Australian Senate, 1996–1999 =

Senate composition at 1 July 1996
Government (37) – (2 seat minority)
Liberal (31)
National Party (5)
Country Liberal (1)

Opposition (29)
Labor (29) (Note: Mal Colston resigned from the Australian Labor Party on 20 August 1996, and served out the remainder of his term as an independent.)

Crossbench (10)
Democrats (7)
Greens (2)
Independent (Harradine) (1)

Changes in composition

This is a list of members of the Australian Senate from 1996 to 1999. Half of the state senators had been elected at the March 1993 election and had terms due to finish on 30 June 1999; the other half of the state senators were elected at the March 1996 election and had terms due to finish on 30 June 2002. The territory senators were elected at the March 1996 election and their terms ended at the next federal election, which was October 1998.

Senator	Party	State	Term ending	Years in office
Eric Abetz	Liberal	Tasmania	1999	1994–2022
Lyn Allison	Democrats	Victoria	2002	1996–2008
Richard Alston	Liberal	Victoria	2002	1986–2004
Andrew Bartlett (Note: Queensland Democrat Senator Cheryl Kernot resigned in 1997, announcing that she would run as an ALP candidate for the House of Representatives. Democrat Andrew Bartlett was appointed as her replacement in the Senate.)	Democrats	Queensland	2002	1997–2008, 2017–2018
Michael Baume (Note: New South Wales Liberal Senator Michael Baume resigned in 1996. Bill Heffernan was appointed as his replacement on 18 September.)	Liberal	New South Wales	1999	1984–1996
Mark Bishop	Labor	Western Australia	2002	1996–2014
Nick Bolkus	Labor	South Australia	1999	1981–2005
Ron Boswell	National	Queensland	2002	1983–2014
Vicki Bourne	Democrats	New South Wales	2002	1990–2002
Bob Brown	Greens	Tasmania	2002	1996–2012
David Brownhill	National	New South Wales	2002	1984–2000
Paul Calvert	Liberal	Tasmania	2002	1987–2007
George Campbell (Note: New South Wales ALP Senator Bruce Childs resigned in 1997. George Campbell was appointed as his replacement on 17 September.)	Labor	New South Wales	2002	1997–2008
Ian Campbell	Liberal	Western Australia	1999	1990–2007
Kim Carr	Labor	Victoria	1999	1993–2022
Grant Chapman	Liberal	South Australia	2002	1987–2008
Bruce Childs	Labor	New South Wales	2002	1980–1997
John Coates (Note: Tasmanian ALP Senator John Coates resigned in 1996. Kerry O'Brien was appointed as his replacement on 5 September.)	Labor	Tasmania	1999	1980–1996
Bob Collins (Note: Northern Territory ALP Senator Bob Collins resigned in March 1998, and Trish Crossin was appointed as his replacement.)	Labor	Northern Territory	1998 (Note: The term of a territory senator ends at the dissolution of the House of Representatives, which was October 1998.)	1987–1998
Jacinta Collins	Labor	Victoria	1999	1995–2005, 2008–2019
Mal Colston (Note: Father of the Senate)	Labor/Independent (Note: Mal Colston resigned from the Australian Labor Party on 20 August 1996, and served out the remainder of his term as an independent.)	Queensland	1999	1975–1999
Stephen Conroy	Labor	Victoria	1999	1996–2016
Peter Cook	Labor	Western Australia	1999	1983–2005
Helen Coonan	Liberal	New South Wales	2002	1996–2011
Barney Cooney	Labor	Victoria	2002	1984–2002
Winston Crane	Liberal	Western Australia	2002	1990–2002
Trish Crossin	Labor	Northern Territory	1998, 2001	1998–2013
Rosemary Crowley	Labor	South Australia	2002	1983–2002
Kay Denman	Labor	Tasmania	1999	1993–2005
Alan Eggleston	Liberal	Western Australia	2002	1996–2014
Chris Ellison	Liberal	Western Australia	1999	1993–2009
Chris Evans	Labor	Western Australia	1999	1993–2013
John Faulkner	Labor	New South Wales	1999	1989–2015
Alan Ferguson	Liberal	South Australia	1999	1992–2011
Jeannie Ferris (Note: South Australian Liberal Senator Jeannie Ferris was elected at the March 1996 election and had been working for Senator Nick Minchin in the period between the declaration of her election in March and taking her seat on 1 July . It had been suggested that this constituted holding an office of profit under the Crown. In order to avoid the risk of her election being overturned, she resigned and was subsequently reappointed to her own vacancy.)	Liberal	South Australia	2002	1996–2007
Dominic Foreman (Note: South Australian ALP Senator Dominic Foreman resigned in 1997. John Quirke was appointed as his replacement on 18 September.)	Labor	South Australia	1999	1980–1997
Michael Forshaw	Labor	New South Wales	1999	1994–2011
Brenda Gibbs	Labor	Queensland	2002	1996–2002
Brian Gibson	Liberal	Tasmania	1999	1993–2002
Brian Harradine	Independent	Tasmania	1999	1975–2005
Bill Heffernan	Liberal	New South Wales	1999	1996–2016
John Herron	Liberal	Queensland	2002	1990–2002
Robert Hill	Liberal	South Australia	2002	1981–2006
John Hogg	Labor	Queensland	2002	1996–2014
Steve Hutchins (Note: New South Wales ALP Senator Belinda Neal resigned in 1998. Steve Hutchins was appointed as her replacement.)	Labor	New South Wales	1999	1998–2011
Rod Kemp	Liberal	Victoria	2002	1990–2008
Cheryl Kernot	Democrats	Queensland	2002	1990–1997
Sue Knowles	Liberal	Western Australia	1999	1984–2005
Meg Lees	Democrats	South Australia	1999	1990–2005
Ross Lightfoot (Note: Western Australian Liberal Senator John Panizza died in 1997. Ross Lightfoot was appointed as his replacement on 19 May.)	Liberal	Western Australia	2002	1997–2008
Kate Lundy	Labor	Australian Capital Territory	1998, 2001	1996–2015
Ian Macdonald	Liberal	Queensland	2002	1990–2019
Sandy Macdonald	National	New South Wales	1999	1993–1999, 2000–2008
David MacGibbon	Liberal	Queensland	1999	1977–1999
Sue Mackay	Labor	Tasmania	2002	1996–2005
Julian McGauran	National	Victoria	1999	1987–1990, 1993–2011
Jim McKiernan	Labor	Western Australia	2002	1984–2002
Dee Margetts	Greens	Western Australia	1999	1993–1999
Nick Minchin	Liberal	South Australia	1999	1993–2011
Shayne Murphy	Labor	Tasmania	1999	1993–2005
Andrew Murray	Democrats	Western Australia	2002	1996–2008
Belinda Neal	Labor	New South Wales	1999	1994–1998
Jocelyn Newman	Liberal	Tasmania	2002	1986–2002
Kerry O'Brien	Labor	Tasmania	1999	1996–2011
Bill O'Chee	National	Queensland	1999	1990–1999
John Panizza	Liberal	Western Australia	2002	1987–1997
Kay Patterson	Liberal	Victoria	2002	1987–2008
Warwick Parer	Liberal	Queensland	1999	1984–2000
Marise Payne (Note: New South Wales Liberal Senator Bob Woods resigned in 1997. Marise Payne was appointed as his replacement on 8 April.)	Liberal	New South Wales	2002	1997–2023
John Quirke	Labor	South Australia	1999	1997–2000
Margaret Reid	Liberal	Australian Capital Territory	1998, 2001	1981–2003
Robert Ray	Labor	Victoria	2002	1981–2008
Margaret Reynolds	Labor	Queensland	1999	1983–1999
Chris Schacht	Labor	South Australia	2002	1987–2002
Nick Sherry	Labor	Tasmania	2002	1990–2012
Jim Short (Note: Victorian Liberal Senator Jim Short resigned in 1997. Karen Synon was appointed as his replacement on 13 May.)	Liberal	Victoria	1999	1984–1997
Natasha Stott Despoja	Democrats	South Australia	2002	1995–2008
Karen Synon	Liberal	Victoria	1999	1997–1999
Grant Tambling	Country Liberal	Northern Territory	1998, 2001	1987–2001
John Tierney	Liberal	New South Wales	1999	1991–2005
Judith Troeth	Liberal	Victoria	1999	1993–2011
Amanda Vanstone	Liberal	South Australia	1999	1984–2007
John Watson	Liberal	Tasmania	2002	1978–2008
Sue West	Labor	New South Wales	2002	1987, 1990–2002
John Woodley	Democrats	Queensland	1999	1993–2001
Bob Woods	Liberal	New South Wales	2002	1994–1997
