= 1993 Australian Senate election =

Australian federal election results

1993 Australian Senate elections
- 13 March 1993

40 of the 76 seats in the Australian Senate 39 seats needed for a majority
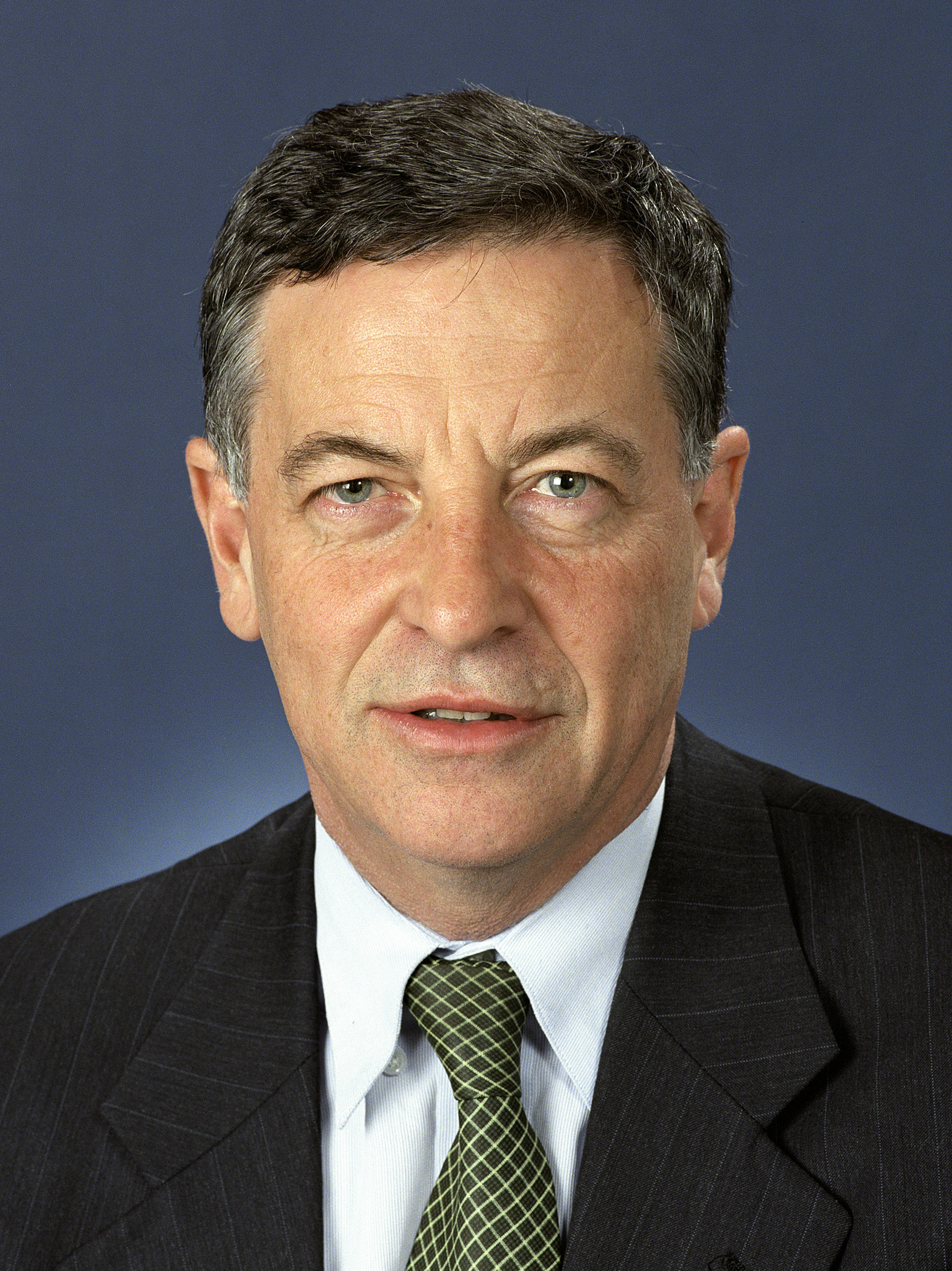

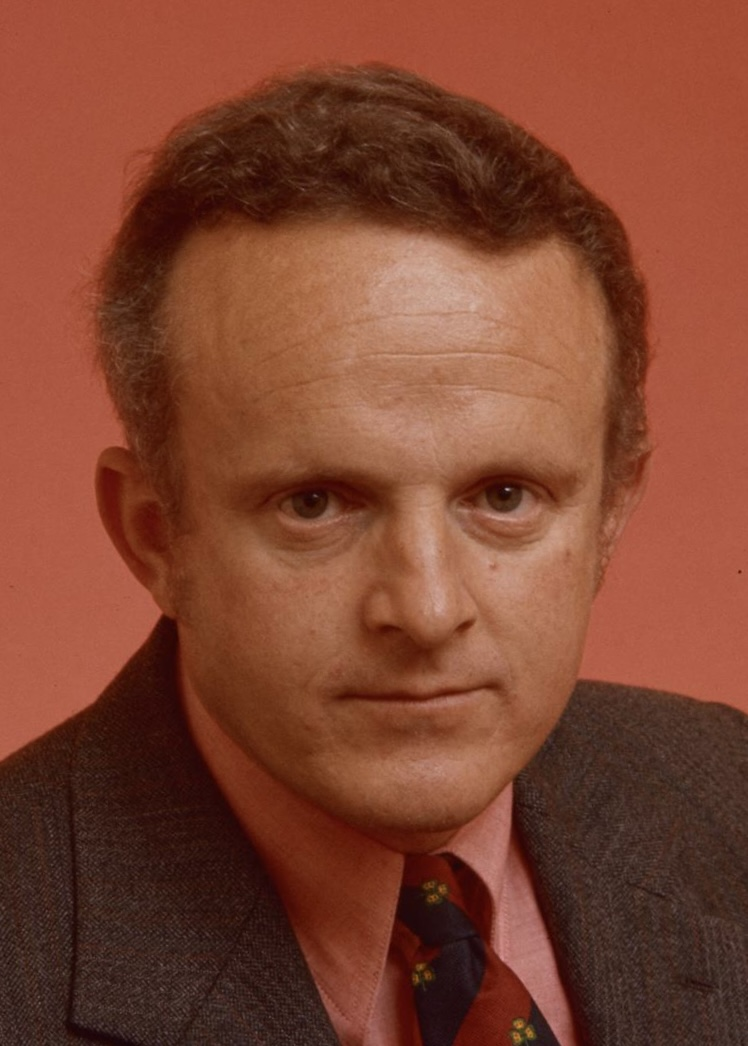

	First party	Second party
Leader	Robert Hill	John Button (retiring)
Party	Liberal–National Coalition	Labor
Leader since	3 April 1990	7 November 1980
Leader's seat	South Australia	Victoria
Seats before	34	32
Seats after	36	30
Seat change	▲2	▼2
Popular vote	4,595,148	4,643,871
Percentage	43.05%	43.50%
Swing	▲1.13%	▲5.09%
	Third party	Fourth party
Leader	John Coulter	None
Party	Democrats	Greens
Leader since	2 October 1991
Leader's seat	Queensland	None
Seats before	8	1
Seats won		2
Seats after	7	2
Seat change	▼1	▲1
Popular vote	566,944	314,845
Percentage	5.31%	2.95%
Swing	▼7.32%	▲0.85%
- Senators elected in the 1993 federal election
Leader of the Senate before election
John Button
Labor
Elected Leader of the Senate
Gareth Evans
Labor

The following tables show state-by-state results in the Australian Senate at the 1993 federal election. Senators total 34 coalition (29 Liberal, four coalition National, one CLP), 30 Labor, two Green, two non-coalition National, seven Democrats, and one Independent. Senator terms are six years (three for territories), and took their seats from 1 July 1993, except the territories who took their seats immediately.

Following the election, outgoing Labor Senate leader John Button retired and resigned from the Senate. Senator Gareth Evans was appointed as the new Leader of the Government in the Senate.

== Australia ==
Senate (STV GV) — 1993–96 – Turnout 96.22% (CV) — Informal 2.55%
Party	Votes	%	Swing	Seats won	Seats held	Change
Labor	4,643,871	43.50	+5.09	17	30	▼2
Liberal–National joint ticket	2,605,157	24.40	–0.07	6	N/A	N/A
Liberal	1,664,204	15.59	+1.03	11	29	Steady
National	290,382	2.72	+0.12	1	6	▲2
Country Liberal	35,405	0.33	+0.04	1	1	Steady
Liberal–National coalition	4,595,148	43.05	+1.13	19	36	▲2
Democrats	566,944	5.31	–7.32	2	7	▼1
Greens (Note: The Australian Greens were founded in 1992, but not all state and territory organisations immediately affiliated to the new federal party. The Greens Senate total includes Queensland Greens (59,303), Greens Western Australia (53,757), New South Wales Green Alliance (46,971), ACT Green Democratic Alliance (46,971), Tasmanian Greens (21,087) and Greens South Australia (15,467).)	314,845	2.95	+0.85	1	2	▲1
Call to Australia	108,945	1.02	–0.35			
Shooters	63,691	0.60	+0.60			
Confederate Action	59,875	0.56	+0.56			
AAFI	46,857	0.44	+0.24			
Democratic Labor	38,317	0.36	+0.21			
Natural Law	38,054	0.36	+0.36			
Pensioner and CIR	22,209	0.21	+0.03			
Grey Power	17,595	0.16	–0.11			
Republican	15,187	0.14	+0.14			
Indigenous Peoples	6,422	0.06	+0.06			
Independent EFF	6,031	0.06	–0.58			
Citizens Electoral Council	5,578	0.05	–0.02			
Tasmania First	2,815	0.03	+0.03			
Abolish Self Govt	1,708	0.02	+0.02			
Others (Note: The independent senator was Brian Harradine (Tasmania).)	120,713	1.13	–1.11	1	1	Steady
Total	10,674,805			40	76	
Invalid/blank votes	279,453	2.55				
Turnout	10,954,258	96.22				
Registered voters	11,384,638					
Source: Federal Elections 1993

== New South Wales ==
Elected	#	Senator	Party
1993	1	Graham Richardson	Labor
1993	2	Michael Baume	Liberal
1993	3	John Faulkner	Labor
1993	4	John Tierney	Liberal
1993	5	Kerry Sibraa	Labor
1993	6	Sandy Macdonald	National
1990	1	Stephen Loosley	Labor
1990	2	Bronwyn Bishop	Liberal
1990	3	Bruce Childs	Labor
1990	4	David Brownhill	National
1990	5	Vicki Bourne	Democrats
1990	6	Suzanne West	Labor

1993 Australian federal election: Senate: New South Wales
Party	Candidate	Votes	%	±%
Quota		512,012		
Labor	1. Graham Richardson (elected 1); 2. John Faulkner (elected 3); 3. Kerry Sibraa (elected 5); 4. Mary-Anne Armstrong	1,681,528	46.9	+6.2
Coalition	1. Michael Baume (Lib) (elected 2); 2. John Tierney (Lib) (elected 4); 3. Sandy Macdonald (Nat) (elected 6); 4. Marise Payne (Lib)	1,394,111	38.9	+0.6
Democrats	1. Karin Sowada; 2. Ray Griffiths; 3. Arthur Chesterfield-Evans	176,324	4.9	−6.9
Greens	1. Steve Brigham; 2. Joy Wallace; 3. Ian Cohen; 4. Cecily Stead	74,620	2.1	+2.0
Shooters	1. Michael Ascher; 2. Ted Orr; 3. Jeff Wilkie; 4. Suzanne O'Connell; 5. Robyn Bourke	63,691	1.8	+1.8
Call to Australia	1. Bruce Coleman; 2. Graham McLennan; 3. Shirley Grigg; 4. Glen Ryan	53,445	1.5	−0.6
Green Alliance	1. Jane Beckmann; 2. Bernie Brian	46,971	1.3	−0.6
AAFI	1. David Kitson; 2. Ian Watherlake	23,941	0.7	+0.7
Group E	1. Leonard Teale; 2. Colin Ward	14,883	0.4	+0.4
Grey Power	1. Frances Roylance; 2. Gay Grounds	10,428	0.3	−0.2
Natural Law	1. Doreen Kerr; 2. Mike Smith; 3. Ines Judd	10,404	0.3	+0.3
Confederate Action	1. John Uebergang; 2. Doug Hawkins	6,725	0.2	+0.2
Independent	Milorad Gajin	5,208	0.1	+0.1
Republican	1. Peter Consadine; 2. Gennie Klein	4,717	0.1	+0.1
Citizens Electoral Council	1. Leone Hay; 2. Robert Butler; 3. Gloria Wood	3,813	0.1	−0.1
Group J	1. O Santa Claus; 2. Lord Rolo	3,648	0.1	+0.1
Group H	1. Patricia Poulos; 2. Peter Archer; 3. John Holley	2,127	0.1	+0.1
Group S	1. Walter Bass; 2. Paul Hales	2,054	0.1	+0.1
Group M	1. David Stevens; 2. Yvonne Harrison	1,384	0.1	+0.1
Group U	1. Robert Schollbach; 2. Karen Stirling	1,133	0.0	0.0
Group Q	1. Rosemary Lavery; 2. Robert John; 3. Priscilla Lavery	670	0.0	0.0
Independent	Michael Anderson	533	0.0	0.0
Independent	Dianne Decker	528	0.0	0.0
Group T	1. Michael Vescio; 2. Pamela Wheatley	386	0.0	0.0
Independent	Argy Beletich	317	0.0	0.0
Independent	Malcolm Milton	168	0.0	0.0
Independent	Katherine De Bry	150	0.0	0.0
Independent	Ron Poulsen	86	0.0	0.0
Independent	Bryan Ellis	86	0.0	0.0
Total formal votes		3,584,079	97.3	+1.6
Informal votes		97,534	2.7	−1.6
Turnout		3,681,613	96.5	+0.6

== Victoria ==
Elected	#	Senator	Party
1993	1	Gareth Evans	Labor
1993	2	Jim Short	Liberal
1993	3	Kim Carr	Labor
1993	4	Julian McGauran	National
1993	5	Olive Zakharov	Labor
1993	6	Judith Troeth	Liberal
1990	1	Richard Alston	Liberal
1990	2	Robert Ray	Labor
1990	3	Kay Patterson	Liberal
1990	4	Barney Cooney	Labor
1990	5	Rod Kemp	Liberal
1990	6	Sid Spindler	Democrats

1993 Australian federal election: Senate, Victoria
Party	Candidate	Votes	%	±%
Quota		392,370		
Labor	1. Gareth Evans (elected 1); 2. Kim Carr (elected 3); 3. Olive Zakharov (elected 5); 4. David McKenzie	1,235,344	45.0	+8.6
Coalition	1. Jim Short (Lib) (elected 2); 2. Julian McGauran (Nat) (elected 4); 3. Judith Troeth (Lib) (elected 6); 4. Tsebin Tchen (Lib); 5. Ian Curtis (Lib); 6. Bill Wall (Lib)	1,211,046	44.0	−0.5
Democrats	1. Robert Wood; 2. Maria Kayak; 3. Marj White; 4. John Pinniger; 5. Diane Casbolt; 6. Kathryn Stear	109,223	4.0	−10.1
Democratic Labor	1. John Mulholland; 2. Michael Rowe; 3. Pat Crea; 4. Christine Dodd; 5. Matthew Cody	38,317	1.4	+0.8
Group B	1. Janet Powell; 2. Michael Hamel-Green; 3. Anne O'Rourke; 4. Laurie Levy	33,710	1.2	+1.2
Greens	1. Francesca Davidson; 2. Loretta Asquini	32,472	1.2	+0.3
Pensioner and CIR	1. Neil McKay; 2. Alistair McKay	22,209	0.8	+0.8
Call to Australia	1. Ken Cook; 2. Murray Graham	20,105	0.7	+0.7
AAFI	1. Denis McCormack; 2. Robyn Spencer	18,926	0.7	+0.7
Natural Law	1. Steve Griffith; 2. Lorna Scurfield; 3. Ngaire Mason	12,347	0.4	+0.4
Republican	1. Brian Buckley; 2. Brendan Gidley	4,760	0.2	+0.2
Independent	Frank Hardy	3,523	0.1	+0.1
Independent	Toma Banjanin	2,216	0.1	+0.1
Independent	Tim Petherbridge	790	0.0	0.0
Independent	Abdul Fazal	565	0.0	0.0
Independent	Gordon Moffatt	365	0.0	0.0
Group K	1. Joe Toscano; 2. Stephen Roper	199	0.0	0.0
Independent	Michael Good	167	0.0	0.0
Independent	Steve Florin	90	0.0	0.0
Independent	Ivan Pavlekovich-Smith	64	0.0	0.0
Citizens Electoral Council	Noelene Isherwood	52	0.0	0.0
Independent	Laurie Bell	49	0.0	0.0
Citizens Electoral Council	Alex Rotaru	45	0.0	0.0
Total formal votes		2,746,584	96.9	+0.5
Informal votes		86,634	3.1	−0.5
Turnout		2,833,218	96.6	+0.4

== Queensland ==
Elected	#	Senator	Party
1993	1	Margaret Reynolds	Labor
1993	2	David MacGibbon	Liberal
1993	3	Bill O'Chee	National
1993	4	Mal Colston	Labor
1993	5	Warwick Parer	Liberal
1993	6	John Woodley	Democrats
1990	1	Gerry Jones	Labor
1990	2	Ian Macdonald	Liberal
1990	3	Gerry Jones	Labor
1990	4	John Herron	Liberal
1990	5	Ron Boswell	National
1990	6	Cheryl Kernot	Democrats

1993 Australian federal election: Senate, Queensland
Party	Candidate	Votes	%	±%
Quota		264,381		
Labor	1. Margaret Reynolds (elected 1); 2. Mal Colston (elected 4); 3. John Bird; 4. Ian McLean	729,265	39.4	+0.3
Liberal	1. David MacGibbon (elected 2); 2. Warwick Parer (elected 5); 3. Ross Cunningham; 4. Ann Buchanan; 5. Henry Bird; 6. Owen Davies	582,766	31.5	+2.2
National	1. Bill O'Chee (elected 3); 2. De-Anne Kelly; 3. Teresa Cobb	268,809	14.5	+0.9
Democrats	1. John Woodley (elected 6); 2. Jonathan Cornish; 3. Gayle Woodrow; 4. Tony Walters	130,405	7.1	−5.4
Greens	1. Drew Hutton; 2. Colin Hunt; 3. Naomi Spencer	59,303	3.2	+3.2
Confederate Action	1. Perry Jewell; 2. Tony Pitt; 3. Sandra Hill; 4. Mark Geissmann; 5. Ryland Gill; 6. Richard Teague	52,942	2.9	+2.9
Call to Australia	1. Alan Sims; 2. Rona Joyner	11,546	0.6	−0.5
Indigenous Peoples	1. Darby McCarthy; 2. Una Branfield	6,422	0.3	+0.3
Natural Law	1. Geoff Wilson; 2. Peter Jackson	3,575	0.2	+0.2
Group E	1. Barry Weedon; 2. Margaret Crompton	2,030	0.1	+0.1
Group H	1. Ronald Alford; 2. Sylvia Smith	1,272	0.1	+0.1
Independent	Steve Dimitriou	1,043	0.1	+0.1
Citizens Electoral Council	John Koehler	538	0.0	0.0
Citizens Electoral Council	Julie Warner	254	0.0	0.0
Independent	Joe Sherlock	236	0.0	0.0
Independent	Barry Garvey	150	0.0	0.0
Independent	Christopher Beilby	105	0.0	0.0
Total formal votes		1,850,661	98.0	+0.5
Informal votes		38,491	2.0	−0.5
Turnout		1,889,152	95.8	+0.7

== Western Australia ==
Elected	#	Senator	Party
1993	1	Sue Knowles	Liberal
1993	2	Peter Cook	Labor
1993	3	Ian Campbell	Liberal
1993	4	Chris Evans	Labor
1993	5	Chris Ellison	Liberal
1993	6	Dee Margetts	Greens
1990	1	Noel Crichton-Browne	Liberal
1990	2	Jim McKiernan	Labor
1990	3	John Panizza	Liberal
1990	4	Michael Beahan	Labor
1990	5	Winston Crane	Liberal
1990	6	Jo Vallentine	Greens

1993 Australian federal election: Senate, Western Australia
Party	Candidate	Votes	%	±%
Quota		139,397		
Liberal	1. Sue Knowles (elected 1); 2. Ian Campbell (elected 3); 3. Chris Ellison (elected 5); 4. Maurice Brockwell; 5. Enzo Sirna; 6. John McCausland	472,131	48.3	+5.0
Labor	1. Peter Cook (elected 2); 2. Chris Evans (elected 4); 3. Mark Bishop; 4. Neil Roberts	373,247	38.3	+4.7
Greens	1. Dee Margetts (elected 6); 2. Chris Williams	53,757	5.6	−2.8
Democrats	1. Jean Jenkins; 2. Helen Hodgson	39,849	4.0	−5.3
National	1. Michael Jardine; 2. Paul Clune; 3. David Lee	17,075	1.7	−1.2
Call to Australia	1. Don Rogers; 2. Beryl Rogers	11,568	1.2	+1.2
Natural Law	1. Michael King; 2. Philip Jackson; 3. Jody Fitzhardinge; 4. Peter Coppin	3,569	0.3	+0.3
Republican	1. David Langley; 2. Rodney Stratton	1,519	0.2	+0.2
Group J	1. Frank Nesci; 2. Paul Nesci	953	0.1	+0.1
Citizens Electoral Council	1. John Seale; 2. Laurence Molloy	876	0.1	+0.1
Independent	Rick Finney	549	0.1	+0.1
Grey Power	Salli Vaughan	245	0.0	−1.0
Independent	John Tucak	226	0.0	0.0
Confederate Action	Roland Richardson	208	0.0	0.0
Total formal votes		975,772	97.9	+0.8
Informal votes		20,983	2.1	−0.8
Turnout		996,755	95.9	+0.8

== South Australia ==
Elected	#	Senator	Party
1993	1	Amanda Vanstone	Liberal
1993	2	Nick Bolkus	Labor
1993	3	Nick Minchin	Liberal
1993	4	Dominic Foreman	Labor
1993	5	Alan Ferguson	Liberal
1993	6	Meg Lees	Democrats
1990	1	Robert Hill	Liberal
1990	2	Rosemary Crowley	Labor
1990	3	John Coulter	Democrats
1990	4	Baden Teague	Liberal
1990	5	Chris Schacht	Labor
1990	6	Grant Chapman	Liberal

1993 Australian federal election: Senate, South Australia
Party	Candidate	Votes	%	±%
Quota		135,140		
Liberal	1. Amanda Vanstone (elected 1); 2. Nick Minchin (elected 3); 3. Alan Ferguson (elected 5); 4. Satish Gupta	431,642	45.6	+4.1
Labor	1. Nick Bolkus (elected 2); 2. Dominic Foreman (elected 4); 3. Graham Maguire; 4. Rosalie McDonald	359,491	38.0	+0.9
Democrats	1. Meg Lees (elected 6); 2. Stephen Swift; 3. Natasha Stott Despoja; 4. Patricia Tickle	93,325	9.8	−6.5
Greens	1. Ally Fricker; 2. Gerhard Weissmann	15,467	1.6	−0.5
Call to Australia	1. David Rodway; 2. David Squirrell	10,762	1.1	−1.0
Natural Law	1. Geoff Wells; 2. Anne Martin; 3. Dulcie Morris	6,936	0.7	+0.7
Grey Power	1. Jack Holder; 2. Betty Preston; 3. Glen Bottam	6,922	0.6	+0.6
Independent EFF	1. David Dwyer; 2. Douglas Giddings; 3. Vanessa Giddings	6,031	0.6	+0.6
National	1. Nola McCallum; 2. Michael Bradshaw	4,498	0.5	+0.1
Republican	1. Bilal Nasrullah; 2. Peter Hill	4,191	0.4	+0.4
AAFI	1. Evonne Moore; 2. Joe Smith	3,597	0.3	+0.3
Group F	1. Alex Liew; 2. Douglas Schirripa	2,716	0.3	+0.3
Independent	Mark Rice	313	0.0	0.0
Independent	Ean Smith	53	0.0	0.0
Independent	Bernard Broom	31	0.0	0.0
Total formal votes		945,975	97.7	+0.2
Informal votes		22,390	2.3	−0.2
Turnout		968,365	95.5	−0.9

== Tasmania ==
Elected	#	Senator	Party
1993	1	Michael Tate	Labor
1993	2	Brian Archer	Liberal
1993	3	John Coates	Labor
1993	4	Brian Gibson	Liberal
1993	5	Brian Harradine	Independent
1993	6	Shayne Murphy	Labor
1990	1	Jocelyn Newman	Liberal
1990	2	Nick Sherry	Labor
1990	3	John Watson	Liberal
1990	4	John Devereux	Labor
1990	5	Paul Calvert	Liberal
1990	6	Robert Bell	Democrat

1993 Australian federal election: Senate, Tasmania
Party	Candidate	Votes	%	±%
Quota		44,110		
Labor	1. Michael Tate (elected 1); 2. John Coates (elected 3); 3. Shayne Murphy (elected 6); 4. Terry Aulich	131,876	42.7	+1.4
Liberal	1. Brian Archer (elected 2); 2. Brian Gibson (elected 4); 3. Eric Abetz	113,347	36.7	−7.4
Independent	Brian Harradine (elected 5)	32,202	10.4	+10.4
Greens	1. Judy Henderson; 2. Peter Jones; 3. Marion Fry	21,087	6.9	+6.9
Democrats	1. Patsy Harmsen; 2. David Stephen	5,162	1.6	−5.7
Tasmania First	1. Alan Sproule; 2. Frances McShane	2,815	0.9	+0.9
Call to Australia	1. Philip Hopson; 2. Janelle Hopson	1,512	0.5	+0.5
Natural Law	1. Greg Broszczyk; 2. Caroline Davies	490	0.1	+0.1
Independent	Ian Jamieson	265	0.1	+0.1
Total formal votes		308,763	97.4	+0.5
Informal votes		8,121	2.6	−0.5
Turnout		316,884	96.6	−0.3

== Australian Capital Territory ==
Elected	#	Senator	Party
1993	1	Bob McMullan	Labor
1993	2	Margaret Reid	Liberal

1993 Australian federal election: Senate, Australian Capital Territory
Party	Candidate	Votes	%	±%
Quota		61,276		
Labor	1. Bob McMullan (elected 1); 2. Maureen Sheehan	89,380	48.6	+7.5
Liberal	1. Margaret Reid (elected 2); 2. Lucinda Spier	64,318	35.0	−1.0
Democrats	1. Domenic Mico; 2. Peter Main	12,656	6.9	−0.7
Greens	1. Kerrie Tucker; 2. David Turbayne	11,168	6.0	+2.7
Independent	Bernard Collaery	3,470	1.9	+1.9
Abolish Self Govt	1. Helen Miller; 2. Ute Ernst	1,708	0.9	+0.9
Natural Law	1. David Seaton; 2. Nanette Kerrison	733	0.4	+0.4
Independent	Arthur Burns	393	0.2	+0.2
Total formal votes		183,826	98.4	+0.8
Informal votes		2,988	1.6	−0.8
Turnout		186,814	97.1	+0.9

== Northern Territory ==
Elected	#	Senator	Party
1993	1	Bob Collins	Labor
1993	2	Grant Tambling	CLP

1993 Australian federal election: Senate, Northern Territory
Party	Candidate	Votes	%	±%
Quota		26,382		
Labor	1. Bob Collins (elected 1); 2. Patty Ring	43,740	55.3	+1.0
Country Liberal	1. Grant Tambling (elected 2); 2. Bob Truman	35,405	44.7	+2.5
Total formal votes		79,145	97.2	0.0
Informal votes		2,312	2.8	0.0
Turnout		81,457	89.0	−0.5

== See also ==
- 1993 Australian federal election
- Candidates of the 1993 Australian federal election
- Members of the Australian Senate, 1993–1996
