= Jack Evans (Australian politician) =

Australian politician (1928–2009)

Senator for Western Australia
- In office 5 March 1983 – 30 June 1985

Personal details
- Born: 28 November 1928 Southern Cross, Western Australia
- Died: 2 October 2009 (aged 80) Wanneroo, Western Australia
- Party: Australian Democrats (after 1977)
- Other political affiliations: Liberal Movement (1975–1976); New Liberal Movement (1976–1977)
- Spouse: Margaret Michel
- Occupation: Management consultant

John Gordon "Jack" Evans (28 November 1928 – 2 October 2009) was an Australian businessman and politician who served as an Australian Democrats senator for Western Australia from 1983 to June 1985.

== Early life ==
Evans was born in the Wheatbelt town of Southern Cross He was the eldest of three sons born to Bill Evans, a locomotive fireman, and his wife Rita. He was educated at North Cottesloe Primary School, Northam High School and Midland Technical School. A fellow student at Northam was the talented athlete Shirley Strickland with whom he was to maintain a lifelong friendship.

He obtained a position managing sporting and other recreational activities at the Railway Institute in Perth and, in 1953, married Margaret Michel. They had two children, a daughter and a son. He became an electrical goods retailer in Perth and later the UK before returning to practise in Perth until the early 1980s as a management consultant specialising in corporate mergers and acquisitions.

== Political career ==
Evans unsuccessfully contested the 1975 Senate election as a Liberal Movement candidate. In 1977, as an organiser for the New Liberal Movement, he was closely associated with John Siddons, Robin Millhouse and others in formation of the Centre-Line Party which was later renamed the Australian Democrats. He has been credited with recruiting Don Chipp as leader of the new party for which he unsuccessfully contested the 1977 and the 1980 Senate elections as the lead WA Democrat candidate. In 1980, he polled above 12% before losing the final seat to Liberal Noel Crichton-Browne in a tight preference count.

He eventually gained election at the March 1983 double dissolution election on his third attempt as an Australian Democrats candidate. He was defeated at the December 1984 election, his seat being won by Jo Vallentine of the Nuclear Disarmament Party. (Though he sat for only 28 months, his term was officially deemed to have begun on 1 July 1982 and ended on 30 June 1985.)

At the 1986 Western Australian state election, he contested an Upper-House seat in circumstances which led to allegations that he had unethically negotiated Labor Party funding assistance in return for crucial election preferences. For the following Senate election in 1987, the party's membership selected him as the No. 2 Senate candidate, precipitating a bitter dispute and a second preselection ballot from which the first ballot winner, Richard Jeffreys, was excluded. Evans was again placed in the second position, deemed unwinnable, this time behind Jean Jenkins, who was successful at the election. In 1988, he survived an expulsion motion from the party's WA branch and for several years withdrew from constructive participation while conducting disputes with the party's WA administration and its national ombudsman. During that time, he mounted an unsuccessful Supreme Court action to prevent circulation of a national ombudsman's report, and acted as campaign manager to former party member Shirley de la Hunty who contested the 1989 Western Australian state election as an independent candidate. In 1993, following the collapse of his Australian Business College, he returned to serving the party in senior administrative positions, both state and federal, and successfully supported and mentored the Senate candidature of Andrew Murray.

== Australian Business College ==
In the 1980s Evans and family members founded the Australian Business College, Perth, which collapsed in January 1993 after controversial dealings with overseas students. An inquiry by the Senate Standing Committee on Employment, Education and Training found that 350 overseas students in Australia and approximately 100 offshore had lost approximately $2.2 million in advance fees paid to the college. Other issues were publicised by the Murdoch University Student Guild, including alleged misleading advertising and intimidation of overseas students by the college. In May, 1988, a group of more than 30 overseas students held a demonstration outside the college, calling for increased regulation of its practices. In subsequent court proceedings, Evans was convicted and fined $4,000. In 1998, Professor Allan Fels, then chairman of the Australian Competition & Consumer Commission (ACCC), told an international conference on higher education that the ACCC's action against the Australian Business College "highlights the need for Australian educational institutions seeking to enrol foreign students to ensure that what is represented to the students is true".

== Death ==
Evans died of cancer at his home in the Perth suburb of Wanneroo, aged 80, on 2 October 2009.

== Sources ==
- Phillips, Harry. "EVANS, John Gordon (1928–2009)". The Biographical Dictionary of the Australian Senate.
- Evans J. G. First Senate speech, 4 May 1983, Senate Hansard page 196
