= Australian Trade Union Training Authority =

The Australian Trade Union Training Authority (TUTA) was an Australian Government funded statutory authority providing education and training programs for union officials.

Michael Beahan was seconded from the Trades and Labor Council in 1974 with two others to set up TUTA in 1975 under the Whitlam Labor government. The authority was established by the Trade Union Training Authority Act of 1975 and operated training centres in each state capital as well as Clyde Cameron College. TUTA was abolished by the Workplace Relations and Other Legislation Amendment Act of 1996.
