= Judith Adams =

Judith Adams may refer to:

- Judith Adams (politician) (1943–2012), New Zealand-born Australian politician
- Judith Elizabeth Adams (1945–2017), English professor and radiologist
- Judi Adams (born 1959), American archer
- Judith Ann Adams (born 1964), American murderer
