= Hugh de Largie =

Australian politician

The Honourable Hugh de Largie
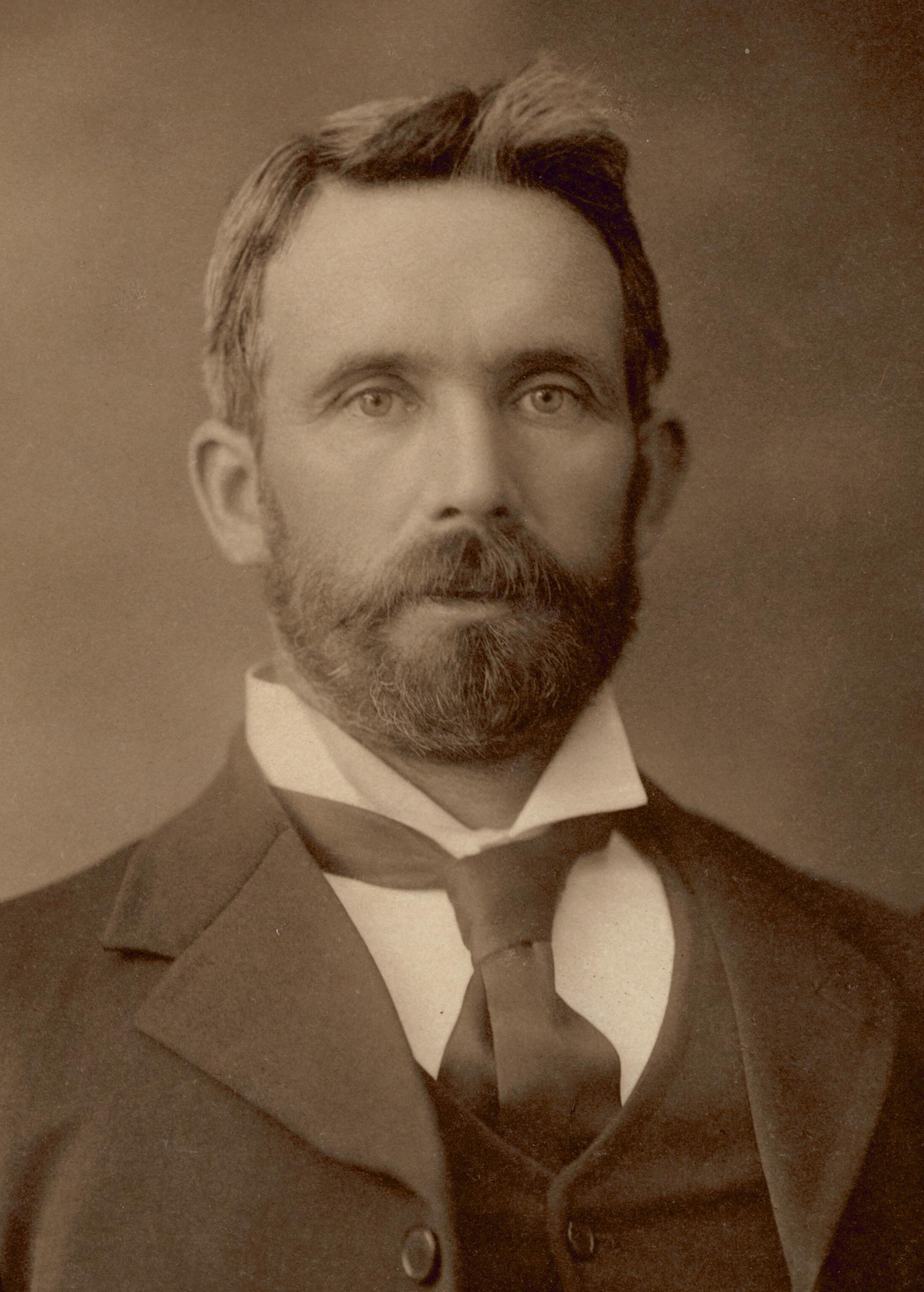

Senator for Western Australia
- In office 29 March 1901 – 30 June 1923

Personal details
- Born: 24 March 1859 Airdrie, Scotland
- Died: 9 May 1947 (aged 88) Randwick, New South Wales, Australia
- Party: Labor (1901–16); National Labor (1916–17) Nationalist (1917–23)
- Spouses: Mary McGregor (m. 1884; died 1946) Elizabeth Renouard (m. 1946)
- Occupation: Unionist

Hugh de Largie (24 March 1859 – 9 May 1947) was an Australian politician who served as a Senator for Western Australia from 1901 to 1922. He was initially a member of the Labor Party, but after the 1916 party split joined the National Labor Party and then the Nationalist Party.

== Early life ==
He was born in Airdrie, Scotland on 24 March 1859. He was a son of coal miner Archibald Hamilton de Largie and his wife Mary, née McLaren, both of whom died while he was very young. De Largie, a devout Roman Catholic, left school in 1869, at the age of 10 years old to work in the Lanarkshire mines, where he became involved in the labour movement.

== Union activism ==
De Largie married Mary McGregor in Glasgow in 1884 and they migrated first to Queensland in 1887 then to Newcastle in New South Wales where, in addition to mining, de Largie acted as a union delegate and secretary of the local branches of the Australian Socialist League and the Labor Electoral League.

De Largie's union activities eventually led to his ban from working as a miner in Newcastle, forcing him to move to the Western Australian goldfields in 1896. In Kalgoorlie, de Largie continued his involvement in the labour movement, taking a leading role in the January 1897 amalgamation of a number of mining unions into the Amalgamated Workers Union (AWA), serving as its foundation president. Under de Largie's presidency, the AWA became the most important union in the colony.

De Largie's role with the AWA led to his prominence in labour politics and de Largie was elected president of the goldfields division of the joint Labor parliamentary committee in April 1899 and inaugural chair of the Western Australian Trades Union and Labor Congress.

== Political career ==
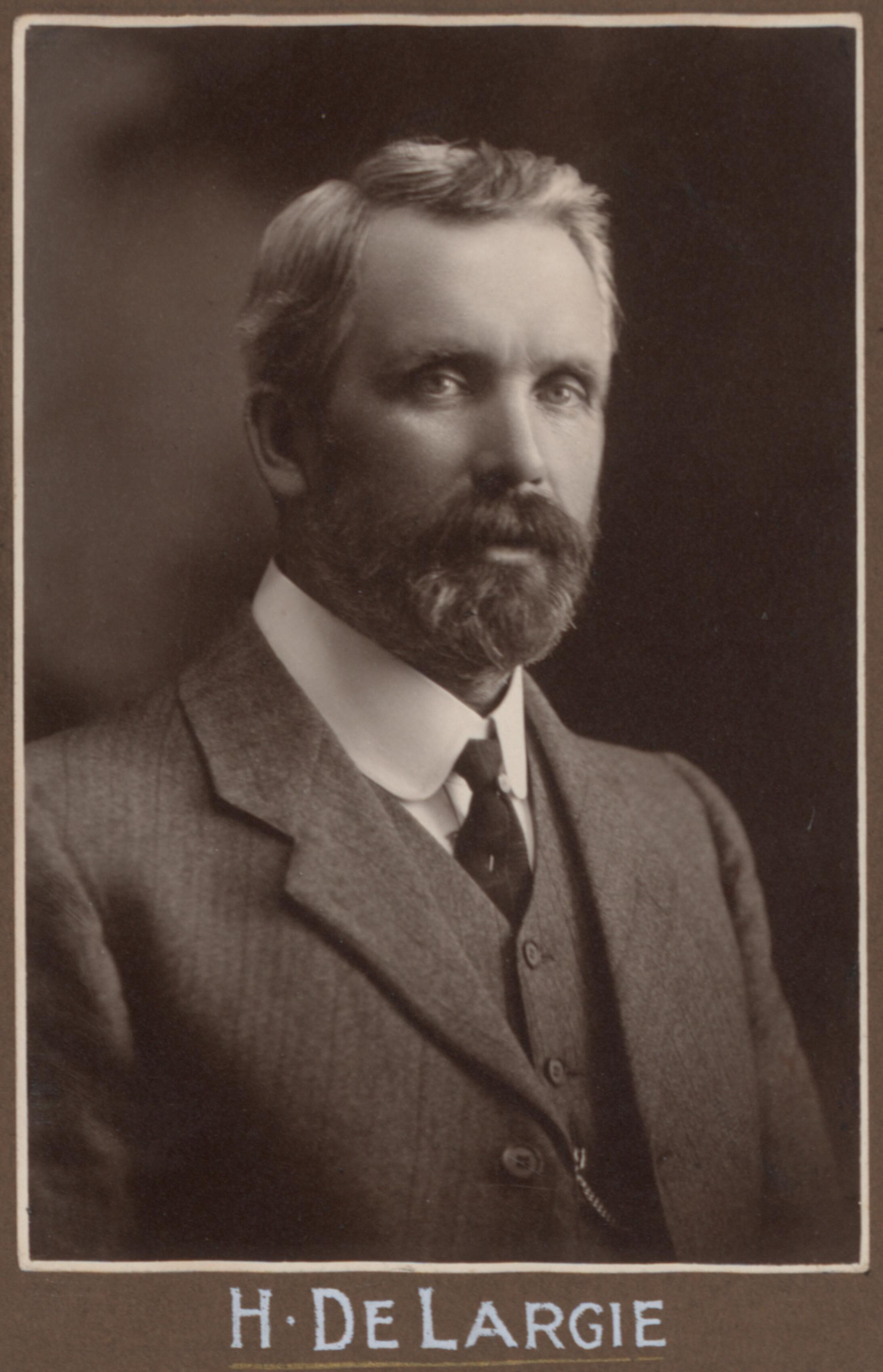
De Largie in 1908

De Largie campaigned for Federation and became the official goldfields Senate candidate of the Western Australian labour movement at the inaugural federal election in 1901.

Described as "an equable, humourless person" who spoke in a 'plain and fearless fashion' with a pronounced Scots accent, Senator de Largie advocated the White Australia Policy, old age pensions for white people, protectionism and a state bank. In 1907 he warned that Western Australia was in anti-Federation mood due to the lack of a transnational railway and in 1909 announced his support for compulsory military service, arguing that the Boers lost their independence because they were unable to defend themselves.

De Largie served as Labor whip in the Senate from 1907 to 1914. He was government whip from 1910 to 1913 and 1917 to 1922. During World War I, de Largie argued strongly in favour of conscription and saw Western Australia voted for conscription during the referendums on the matter. As a result, de Largie followed Australian Prime Minister Billy Hughes out of the Australian Labor Party in the conscription split of 1916. de Largie became first a member of the National Labor Party before joining the Nationalist Party of Australia. De Largie lost his seat at the 1922 election.

== Later years ==
In retirement de Largie remained in Melbourne and set up the Association of Members of the First Federal Parliament. In 1940 he moved to Sydney. He died in Randwick on 9 May 1947 as one of the last survivors of the first federal parliament.

== Personal life ==
De Largie was married twice. His first wife Mary McGregor, whom he married in Glasgow in 1884. After her death, on 8 January 1946, he married Elizabeth Jeannie Marie Renoua Renouard. He had four children, three girls and a boy.
