= Patricia Giles =

Australian politician and activist

Patricia Giles AM

Senator for Western Australia
- In office 1 July 1981 – 30 June 1993

Personal details
- Born: Patricia Jessie White; 16 November 1928 Minlaton, South Australia
- Died: 9 August 2017 (aged 88)
- Party: Labor
- Other political affiliations: Defence of Government Schools (1969–1971)
- Spouse: Keith Giles (m. 1952; div. 1975)
- Children: 4
- Education: University of Western Australia
- Occupation: Nurse

Patricia Jessie Giles AM (née White; 16 November 1928 – 9 August 2017) was an Australian politician and activist for women's rights. She was a Senator for Western Australia from 1981 to 1993, representing the Australian Labor Party (ALP). She was the president of the International Alliance of Women for three terms, the last ending in 2004.

== Early life ==
Giles was born on 16 November 1928 in Minlaton, South Australia. She was the older of two daughters born to Marjorie Eva (née Norris) and Eustace Frederick White; her mother was a schoolteacher and her father was a car salesman, shopkeeper and accountant.

Giles spent her early years in Melbourne, moving to Adelaide in 1931 with her mother after her parents separated. She was raised at her maternal grandparents' home in Woodville, attending Woodville Primary School and Croydon Girls' Junior Technical School. After leaving school, she worked at a bank for a year before enrolling in a general nursing course in Renmark. She undertook further training at Royal Adelaide Hospital and qualified as a nurse in 1950.

In 1951, Giles moved to Perth where she obtained a midwifery certification at King Edward Memorial Hospital for Women. In 1952, she married doctor Keith Giles, with whom she had five children. She was predeceased by her only son in 1972 and divorced in 1975. Giles and her husband settled in Bassendean, also living in England for two years while he undertook specialist training in anesthetics.

== Public life ==
In 1971, Giles was appointed to the Health and Education Council of Western Australia and became a vice-president of the Federation of West Australian Parents' and Citizens' Associations. In 1974 she was appointed by the Whitlam government as chair of the Western Australia Committee on Discrimination in Employment and Occupation.

Giles became the inaugural state convenor of the Women's Electoral Lobby in 1973. She was active in the women's liberation movement and was mentored by Irene Greenwood, who arranged for her to attend the 1975 World Conference on Women in Mexico City.

In 1974, Giles joined the Hospital Employees' Industrial Union of Western Australia as an organiser. The following year she became the first woman elected to the executive of the Trades and Labour Council of Western Australia.

== Politics ==
=== Early activities ===
Giles first stood for parliament at the 1969 federal election, standing as a Defence of Government Schools (DOGS) candidate in the seat of Perth. She also contested the 1971 Western Australian state election for DOGS, running in the seat of Mirrabooka, but joined the Australian Labor Party (ALP) in the same year.

In 1976, Giles became the first woman elected to the administrative committee of the Australian Labor Party (Western Australian Branch); she was elected as a state vice-president in 1981. She first stood for the party at the 1977 federal election, unsuccessfully contesting the safe Liberal seat of Curtin.

=== Senate ===
At the 1980 federal election, she was elected as an ALP Senator for Western Australia. During her twelve years as a senator she was active in issues related to women, she led the Australian delegation to the United Nations Decade for Women meetings in the 1980s. She and Sara Dowse contributed the piece "Women in a Warrior Society" to the 1984 anthology Sisterhood Is Global: The International Women's Movement Anthology, edited by Robin Morgan.

== Later life ==
Following her retirement from politics, Giles continued to be active in women's rights, serving three terms as president of the International Alliance of Women. On Australia Day, 2010, she was named a Member of the Order of Australia, "For service to the community through organisations and advisory bodies that promote the interests of women, and to the Parliament of Australia". She died on 9 August 2017 from dementia, aged 88.
