= Sue Knowles =

Australian politician

Senator for Western Australia
- In office 1 December 1984 – 30 June 2005

Personal details
- Born: Susan Christine Knowles; 10 April 1951 (age 75) Brisbane, Queensland, Australia
- Party: Liberal Party of Australia

Susan Christine Knowles (born 10 April 1951) is an Australian former politician who served as a Senator for Western Australia from 1984 to 2005, representing the Liberal Party. She briefly served as a shadow minister under John Hewson from 1993 to 1994.

== Early life ==
Knowles was born in Brisbane, Queensland. She was the sales manager of a Perth office equipment company before entering politics. In 1979 she was appointed to the National Youth Advisory Group within the Department of Employment and Youth Affairs.

== Political career ==
Knowles served as state president of the Young Liberal Movement from 1977 to 1981. She later held various positions in the Liberal Party of Australia (Western Australian Division), including state executive member, state council member, vice-president, and senior vice-president.

=== Senate ===
Knowles was elected to the Senate at the 1984 federal election and re-elected in 1987, 1993 and 1998. She served as her party's deputy whip in the Senate from 1987 to 1993 and then served in John Hewson's shadow ministry from 1993 to 1994, holding the multicultural affairs portfolio. According to The Canberra Times, she was "the ultimate Hewson loyalist in WA". In August 1994 she publicly opposed new opposition leader Alexander Downer's decision to sack Hewson from the shadow ministry. Knowles later served as chair of the community affairs legislation committee from 1997 until her retirement in 2005. She "played a key role in its inquiries into tobacco advertising prohibition and stem cell research".

In 1995, Knowles came into conflict with her Liberal colleague Noel Crichton-Browne over allegations that he had been violent towards his wife several years earlier. Knowles stated that she had helped shelter Crichton-Browne's wife at the time. The allegations came three days after Crichton-Browne was expelled from the Liberal Party. In June 1995, it was reported that Crichton-Browne was being investigated for making death threats towards Knowles. He denied that he had threatened her, stating that the allegations were "scurrilous, crude and filthy". Knowles initially did not comment, but in September confirmed that she had made a complaint to the Western Australia Police. In October 1998, she publicly retracted her statements and apologised to Crichton-Browne, as well as paying him a settlement of $20,000.

In 1999, the disciplinary committee of the WA Liberals voted to expel Knowles from the party over unnamed complaints, apparently due to the continued influence of Crichton-Browne. Other federal MPs and Premier Richard Court opposed the committee's recommendation, and it was subsequently rejected by the party's state council. In March 2003, Knowles announced that she would not re-contest her seat at the next federal election. Her term ended on 30 June 2005.

== Later career ==
Knowles was appointed convenor of the Australian Classification Review Board in January 2019, to a two-year term. She has served on the Ad Standards Community Panel since December 2017.
