= Ross Lightfoot =

Australian politician (1936–2024)

Senator for Western Australia
- In office 19 May 1997 – 30 June 2008
- Preceded by: John Panizza

Personal details
- Born: 11 August 1936 Port Lincoln, South Australia, Australia
- Died: 11 January 2024 (aged 87)
- Party: Liberal Party of Australia
- Occupation: Policeman, grazier

Philip Ross Lightfoot (11 August 1936 – 11 January 2024) was an Australian politician. He was a Liberal member of the Australian Senate from 1997 to 2008, representing the state of Western Australia.

== Early life ==
Lightfoot was born in Port Lincoln, South Australia and was educated at first the Adelaide, and then Kalgoorlie School of Mines. In the 1950s, he spent time as a weekend soldier, as a result of national service. Lightfoot joined the Liberal Party of Australia soon afterwards. He worked as a mounted policeman between 1959 and 1962. In 1972, Lightfoot became a pastoralist and grazier, a line of employment he subsequently occupied for twenty years.

== Politics ==
=== Western Australian parliament ===
His political career began in 1986, when Lightfoot won the seat of Murchison-Eyre in Western Australia's Legislative Assembly. It was here that he first caused controversy, when he wrote to United States Secretary of State George Shultz, urging the US Government to dump subsidised wheat in Australia's international wheat markets in Russia and China. He later retracted the statement.

Lightfoot retired from the Legislative Assembly in 1989, but made a comeback in 1993, representing the North Metropolitan Region in the Legislative Council. While in state parliament, he also advocated for the secession of Western Australia from the rest of the country.

=== Federal parliament ===
In 1997, Western Australian Senator John Panizza died, and Lightfoot, having been selected to fill the vacancy, moved to federal politics. He soon became a controversial figure within the party, and was rebuked by Prime Minister John Howard for telling the Senate that Aborigines in their native state were the lowest colour on the civilisation spectrum.

Lightfoot was one of a small group of Liberal MPs willing to make a preference deal with controversial MP Pauline Hanson and her One Nation party. However, this was to assist him in gaining re-election in 2001. His comments led to numerous moves to oust him from membership of his own party, but he hung on, as he was seen to represent a movement of rural conservatives in Western Australia.

Lightfoot was an active campaigner for the rights of white Zimbabwean farmers displaced by the regime of Robert Mugabe. In 2002, he made the suggestion that some could be given residency in Australia, but denied that this should apply to black farm workers as well. This was due to Robert Mugabe's "Africa for Africans" policies and not allowing for the travelling rights of many oppressed peoples at that time.

In 2003, Lightfoot was involved in an altercation on the floor of the House of Representatives during a visit by President of the United States George W. Bush. Australian Greens senators Bob Brown and Kerry Nettle were attempting to hand Bush a letter from the wife of Mamdouh Habib, an Australian citizen who at the time was being held at Guantanamo Bay, Cuba, following his apprehension by United States forces in either (this is disputed) Afghanistan or Pakistan. Lightfoot physically blocked the path of the senators, elbowing Brown and reportedly telling Nettle to "Fuck off and die".

On 17 March 2005, News Limited newspapers reported that Lightfoot, while on a parliamentary tour to Iraq, smuggled US$20,000 into the country on behalf of Woodside Petroleum as a donation for the Kurdish government, having been issued with a pistol for personal security. The newspapers published photographs of Lightfoot appearing with Kurdish militants wielding an AK-47. Lightfoot strenuously denied the allegations and threatened legal action against the newspapers carrying the story. Lightfoot denied handling the money personally, saying he merely witnessed the money changing hands. After speaking to Howard, Lightfoot issued a statement in which he said he felt "uncomfortable" having the gun with him and did not carry it personally. The newspapers in turn refused to retract the reports and accused Lightfoot of contradicting himself.

Who's Who in Australia reports Lightfoot as being a life fellow of the International Biographical Association, a vanity press publication.

In April 2007, facing near-certain defeat in a preselection challenge by Liberal Party vice-president Mathias Cormann, he announced he would retire at the end of his term in the Senate. Cormann was subsequently preselected to replace Lightfoot, but then selected unanimously by the WA Liberal Party State Council to replace Ian Campbell in the Senate, after Campbell announced his surprise resignation in May 2007. Michaelia Cash instead became Lightfoot's preselected replacement. Lightfoot retired from politics in 2008.

Lightfoot stated that he considered Cormann (although he stopped short of naming him) an "inappropriate person" to replace him. Lightfoot's main complaint was that there were "more appropriate people" to succeed him "who have served the party longer" and "who have been in the country longer".

== Death ==
Lightfoot died on 11 January 2024, at the age of 87.
