= Alan Eggleston =

Australian politician (1941–2025)

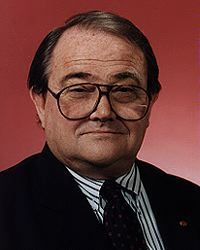

Senator for Western Australia
- In office 1 July 1996 – 30 June 2014

Personal details
- Born: 30 December 1941 Busselton, Western Australia, Australia
- Died: 13 May 2025 (aged 83) South Perth, Western Australia, Australia
- Party: Liberal Party of Australia
- Education: University of Western Australia
- Website: senatoralaneggleston.com

Alan Eggleston (30 December 1941 – 13 May 2025) was an Australian politician who served as a Senator for Western Australia from 1996 to 2014, as a member of the Liberal Party of Australia. Prior to his tenure in the senate he was active in the local politics of Port Hedland, Western Australia.

== Early life and education ==
Alan Eggleston was born in Busselton, Western Australia, on 30 December 1941. He was educated at the Christ Church Grammar School from 1953 to 1959. He graduated from the University of Western Australia. He worked in the United Kingdom from 1965 to 1969. He started practicing in Pilbara in 1974, and initially planned to work there for six months, but remained there for 22 years.

== Career ==
Eggleston was an active member of the Liberal Party of Australia in the Kalgoorlie North Division, which he was a founding member of in 1974. He was a member of the Liberal Party State Council of Western Australia from 1976 to 1996, and a member of the Liberal Party State Executive of Western Australia from 1980 to 1985, and 1992 to 1996. He was a member of the Liberal Party of Western Australia's policy committee from 1988 to 2008.

Eggleston was elected to the Port Hedland Council in 1988, and served until 1996. He served as deputy mayor of Port Hedland from 1992 to 1993, and as mayor from 1993 to 1996. He was a member of the Pilbara Development Commission from 1994 to 1996.

=== Senate ===
In the 1987 federal election, Eggleston was placed in the 6th position on the Liberal list, but was not elected. He was placed in the 3rd position on the list for the 1996 election and won a seat in the Australian Senate. He was reelected in 2001 and 2007 before declining to run in the 2013 election.

During Eggleston's tenure in the senate he was chair of the Legislation Committee for 8 years. He was deputy whip from 22 August 2002 to 11 September 2006.

== Personal life ==
Eggleston had achondroplasia and dwarfism. He was awarded the Order of Australia on 10 June 2019. He died on 13 May 2025.

== Works cited ==
=== News ===
- "Who are you? Alan Eggleston". Australian Broadcasting Corporation. 11 April 2013. Archived from the original on 19 June 2013.

=== Web ===
- "Former Senator Alan Eggleston". Parliament of Australia. Archived from the original on 21 November 2026.
- Buxton, Jeremy (26 May 2025). "Alan Eggleston AM 1941-2025". Liberal Party of Australia. Archived from the original on 17 February 2026.
