= John Panizza =

Australian politician

Senator for Western Australia
- In office 11 July 1987 – 31 January 1997
- Succeeded by: Ross Lightfoot

Personal details
- Born: 24 March 1931 Southern Cross, Western Australia
- Died: 31 January 1997 (aged 65) Cairns, Queensland, Australia
- Party: Liberal
- Spouse: Coral Anne Noble (m. 1958)
- Occupation: Farmer

John Horace Panizza (Italian: [paˈnittsa]; 24 March 1931 – 31 January 1997) was an Australian politician. He was a Senator for Western Australia from 1987 until his death in 1997, representing the Liberal Party. He was a farmer before entering politics.

== Early life ==
Panizza was born on 24 March 1931 in Southern Cross, Western Australia. He was the son of Caterina Cristina (née Della Bona) and Bortolo "Bob" Panizza. His parents were Italian immigrants; his father was born in Tirano, Lombardy, and arrived in Australia in 1922. He visited Italy in 1928 to marry and on his return settled on a farming property near Marvel Loch, Western Australia.

Panizza was raised on the family farm, which by 1940 his father had expanded to a wheat and wool property of 6,500 hectares (16,000 acres). His father also invested in mining with other Italian immigrants and was a part-owner of the May Queen mine near Marvel Loch, helping finance his farming activities. Panizza spoke Italian as his first language and did not learn English until the age of nine. He was sent to boarding school at Aquinas College, Perth, returning to work on the family farm with his two brothers. He eventually took over as manager from his father and also had real estate interests.

== Politics ==
Panizza was elected to the Yilgarn Shire Council in 1975 and served as president from 1982 to 1987. He was initially a member of the National Party and was an unsuccessful preselection candidate for the Western Australian Legislative Council in 1985. He subsequently joined the Liberal Party and narrowly lost to the incumbent Nationals MP Harry Gayfer at the 1986 Legislative Council election.

=== Senate ===
At the 1987 federal election, which followed a double dissolution, Panizza was placed fifth on the Liberal Party's Senate ticket in Western Australia and elected to a three-year Senate term. He was re-elected at the 1990 and 1996 elections.

Panizza was reportedly the first Italian-Australian elected to the Senate. In 1990 he moved a motion in the Senate expressing regret at the internment of Italians during World War II.

In the Senate, Panizza spoke frequently on agricultural matters and was a "consistent advocate for mineral exploration and development". In 1994, against the government's wishes, he secured the establishment of a Senate inquiry into the CSIRO rural research activities, with the support of Democrats and Greens WA senators. According to The Canberra Times, the inquiry followed "months of controversy and turmoil within the CSIRO", but faced difficulties when CSIRO chief executive John Stocker stated the inquiry was of "no value" to the organisation and the relevant government minister Peter Cook stated he would ignore its findings.

Panizza served as the Liberal Party's Senate whip from 1995 until his death in office in 1997, having previously served as deputy whip from 1993 to 1995. He was a social conservative, in 1993 stating that he was "utterly disgusted [...] almost sick in the stomach" by moves towards legal recognition of same-sex relationships in certain circumstances. He opposed the Keating government's Human Rights (Sexual Conduct) Act 1994, which repealed Tasmania's anti-sodomy laws, but ultimately voted in favour of the legislation in line with the Liberal Party's position under Alexander Downer.

== Personal life ==
In 1958, Panizza married Coral Noble, with whom he had four children. He died on 31 January 1997 while in Cairns, Queensland, to attend a Senate committee hearing. Ross Lightfoot was appointed to replace him.
