= Michael Beahan =

Australian politician (1937–2022)

The Honourable Michael Beahan AM

President of the Senate
- In office 1 February 1994 – 30 June 1996
- Preceded by: Kerry Sibraa
- Succeeded by: Margaret Reid

Senator for Western Australia
- In office 11 July 1987 – 30 June 1996

Personal details
- Born: Michael Eamon Beahan; 21 January 1937 London, England
- Died: 30 January 2022 (aged 85) Melbourne, Australia
- Party: Australian Labor Party
- Education: University of Western Australia
- Occupation: Teacher, administrator

Michael Eamon Beahan AM (21 January 1937 – 30 January 2022) was a British-born Australian politician who served as the 19th President of the Australian Senate, holding that position from 1 February 1994 to 30 June 1996. He was a Senator representing Western Australia in the Australian Senate from 1987 to 1996.

== Early life and career ==
Born in London, England to Irish parents in 1937, Michael Beahan was educated at the Salesian College in Battersea, where he successfully completed O levels in 1953. Following a year as a clerk with a large insurance company, he migrated to Australia with his parents, four brothers and his sister in 1954. He commenced work as a process worker at the Australian Electrical Company, which manufactured electric motors, transformers and welders at its East Perth factory, later gaining an apprenticeship with an allied company. Having completed his apprenticeship he gained an A grade licence, permitting him to carry out all types of electrical work and later established his own small business as an electrical contractor. During this time he undertook compulsory military service (three months full-time and two years compulsory part-time) serving with the 13th Field Squadron of the Royal Australian Engineers.

In 1964 he returned to study, completing his matriculation at Leederville Technical College, Perth, and went on to complete degrees in Arts and Education at the University of Western Australia. He taught at secondary and tertiary levels, becoming in 1973 the Trades and Labor Council's first education officer. From this position he was seconded to Melbourne in 1974 as part of a three-person team to set up the Australian Trade Union Training Authority (TUTA), a Federal Government funded statutory authority providing education and training programs for union officials. He ran TUTA's first three-week residential "train the trainer" course and in 1975 became TUTA's Western Australian Director, a position he held until 1981.

From 1981 to 1987, Beahan was State Secretary of the Western Australian Branch of the Australian Labor Party (ALP). (He was also a member of the National Executive of the ALP for eleven years, National Vice-president for four and International Secretary for four years.) He played a pivotal role in successful State election campaigns in 1983 and 1986, and in successful federal campaigns in 1983, 1984 and 1987, when he was elected to parliament.

== Parliamentary career ==
During his parliamentary career Senator Beahan was, among other things, Chairman of the Joint Statutory Committee on Corporations and Securities and of one of the Senate's Estimates Committees. He was also a member of the Joint Foreign Affairs, Defence and Trade Committee and, at various times its Defence, Trade and Human Rights Committees, the Senate Education and Training Committee and the Joint Electoral Matters Committee. As President of the Senate he was also National Chairman of the Commonwealth Parliamentary Association.

During his time in parliament, Beahan was also the national convenor of the Centre Left faction of the Australian Labor Party, a grouping which exercised the balance of power both in the parliamentary party and at the party's national conference and national executive and enjoyed influence beyond its numbers, particularly during the period of the Hawke and Keating governments.

He was elected President of the Senate in March 1994, succeeding Kerry Sibraa. At the March 1996 general election he was defeated in his bid for another six-year term as Senator for Western Australia to commence on 1 July. His term as a Senator ended on 30 June, but he nevertheless had the authority to act as President of the Senate until his successor Margaret Reid was elected in August.

== Retirement and death ==
Beahan was a semi-retired consultant providing strategic and political advice to business and the not-for-profit sector on strategic planning and how to deal with government. He was a director of Merri Health, a major health provider in north west Melbourne, a former member of the board of Neighbourhood Houses Victoria and of the board of the Australian Neighbourhood Houses and Centres Association and chairman of its Public Fund. Beahan was married to Margaret Beahan (née Morris) and had two children, Daniel Beahan and Kate Beahan, two step children, Georgia Matterson and Michael Matterson and eight grandchildren.

Beahan was appointed a Member of the Order of Australia on Australia Day 2011. He was also awarded the Centenary Medal and the National Service Medal. Beahan died on 30 January 2022, at the age of 85.

Political offices
Preceded by Kerry Sibraa	President of the Australian Senate; 1994–1996	Succeeded by Margaret Reid
