= Andrew Murray (Australian politician) =

Australian politician

Senator for Western Australia
- In office 1 July 1996 – 30 June 2008
- Preceded by: Christabel Chamarette
- Succeeded by: Louise Pratt

Royal Commissioner for the Royal Commission into Institutional Responses to Child Sexual Abuse
- In office 11 January 2013 – 15 December 2017 Serving with Peter McClellan, Bob Atkinson, Jennifer Coate, Robert Fitzgerald, Helen Milroy

Personal details
- Born: Andrew James Marshall Murray; 29 January 1947 (age 79) Hove, England
- Party: Australian Democrats
- Education: Rhodes University; University of Oxford
- Occupation: Businessman, consultant

Andrew James Marshall Murray (born 29 January 1947) is an Australian politician. He was an Australian Democrats member of the Australian Senate from 1996 to 2008, representing Western Australia. In 2013, Murray was appointed a Royal Commissioner on the Australian Government Royal Commission into Institutional Responses to Child Sexual Abuse.

== Background and early years ==
Murray was born in Hove, in the United Kingdom. In 1951 he was sent as a child migrant to the British colony of Southern Rhodesia (now Zimbabwe), where he was educated before graduating from Rhodes University in South Africa with degrees in English and History. He continued his education at University of Oxford (Rhodes Scholar 1971), where he graduated with a degree in Philosophy, Politics and Economics.

Returning to Africa, Murray worked as an executive in large corporations, then ran his own businesses. He also worked as a consultant, lecturer and industry journalist and served in the Rhodesian Air Force. He was deported from South Africa in 1968 for opposing the apartheid policies of the white minority régime in his role as Deputy Vice President of the National Union of South African Students. The deportation order was withdrawn in 1977. Murray migrated to Australia in 1989.

== Political career ==
Murray was applauded by some as an intelligent and thoughtful debater in the Senate. Others believe that he acted against the wishes of his party's members in voting for the Goods and Services Tax bills in 1999, a stance which caused an irreparable party-room rift, leading to terminal loss of electoral support.

Murray pushed for greater transparency in government contracting activities by obtaining Senate support for a motion that required federal government ministers to indicate what clauses in contracts are confidential and to then justify the need for confidentiality.

Murray did not seek re-election at the 2007 federal election and retired at the expiration of his term on 30 June 2008.

== Royal commissioner ==
On 11 January 2013 the Prime Minister of Australia, Julia Gillard, announced Murray's appointment through Letters Patent as one of six Commissioners to the Royal Commission into Institutional Responses to Child Sexual Abuse.
