= Mark Bishop =

Australian politician

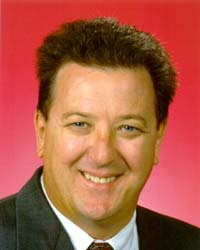

Senator for Western Australia
- In office 1 July 1996 – 30 June 2014

Personal details
- Born: 29 June 1954 (age 72) Adelaide
- Party: Australian Labor Party

Thomas Mark Bishop (born 29 June 1954) is a former Australian politician who served as an Australian Labor Party member of the Australian Senate representing the state of Western Australia from July 1996 until June 2014. He was born in Adelaide, South Australia and was educated at the University of Adelaide and Harvard University. He was an industrial officer and union secretary before entering politics.

Bishop was Shadow Minister for Veterans' Affairs 2001–04, Shadow Minister for Customs 2003–04 and Shadow Minister for Defence Industry, Procurement and Personnel 2005–2006.

In December 2006, Bishop announced that he would not recontest his Senate seat, due to expire on 30 June 2008. However, before the 2007 he decided to recontest and was re-elected for a further six-year term.

In the Rudd Labor Government, Senator Bishop was chair of the Senate Standing Committee for Foreign Affairs, Defence and Trade, as well as being a member of a number of other Joint House and Senate committees.

Bishop withdrew from Senate preselection for the 2014 election after a factional deal which would have seen him relegated to an unwinnable position on the ticket. He subsequently retired from politics.
