= Noel Crichton-Browne =

Australian politician

Senator for Western Australia
- In office 1 July 1981 – 30 June 1996

Personal details
- Born: 2 February 1944 (age 82) Wiluna, Western Australia
- Party: Liberal (to 1995); Independent (from 1995)
- Spouse: Esther Stevens (m. 1969)
- Occupation: Company manager

Noel Ashley Crichton-Browne (born 2 February 1944) is a former Australian politician. He was a Senator for Western Australia from 1981 to 1996 and served as Deputy President of the Senate from 1993 to 1995. He was a member of the Liberal Party until his expulsion amid factional conflict in 1995.

== Early life ==
Crichton-Browne was born on 2 February 1944 in the remote mining town of Wiluna, Western Australia. He was one of three children born to Margaret Bennett (née Lasscock) and John Crichton-Browne. His father was an engineer at the Wiluna Gold Mine, while his mother worked as a nurse.

Crichton-Browne received his early education at state schools, before boarding at St Ildephonsus College' in New Norcia and Scotch College, Perth. After leaving school he joined the state government's Department of Mines as a clerk based in Southern Cross. He later moved to Marble Bar where he was appointed mining registrar in 1968 at the age of 24. After five years in Marble Bar he moved to Perth where he became wealthy through his mining and property interests.

== Early political involvement ==
Crichton-Browne joined the Liberal Party in the late 1960s. He was president of the party's Bedford–Inglewood branch and was elected as a state vice-president in 1973. He subsequently served as state president of the Liberal Party from 1975 to 1979.

Being independently wealthy, Crichton-Browne was able to work full-time for the Liberal Party recruiting members and establishing new branches, travelling widely in regional Western Australia. His personal ties with officeholders in new branches allowed him to develop a power base and gain a reputation as a powerbroker. He was politically aligned with state premier Charles Court, with whom he shared similar views on resource development and states' rights, and their supporters were nicknamed the "Old Guard".

== Senator, 1981–1996 ==
=== Electoral record ===
At the 1980 federal election, Crichton-Browne was elected to a six-year Senate term commencing on 1 July 1981. He had won preselection for the third position on the Liberal ticket and narrowly defeated Australian Democrats candidate Jack Evans for the final vacancy in Western Australia. He personally funded a series of television advertisements.

Crichton-Browne was re-elected at the 1983, 1984, 1987 and 1990 federal elections. His first and third terms were cut short by double dissolutions.

=== Parliamentary work and political views ===
Crichton-Browne served in Andrew Peacock's shadow ministry from 1989 to 1990 as secretary to the shadow cabinet, but otherwise was an active backbencher. He served on fifteen Senate committees during his tenure. He was deputy president of the Senate and chairman of committees from 1993 to 1995, during which he "advocated strict standards of behaviour in the chamber".

In his maiden speech, Crichton-Browne stated he was "opposed to the centralising of power in Canberra" and criticised the economic policies of the Fraser government, which he felt had been disadvantageous to Western Australia's resource industry. He crossed the floor on ten occasions during his Senate tenure – a comparatively large number although not uncommon among Liberal backbenchers.

Crichton-Browne held socially conservative views and opposed several pieces of equal-opportunity legislation introduced by the Hawke government, including the Sex Discrimination Act 1984, the Affirmative Action (Equal Employment Opportunity for Women) Act 1986, and amendments to the Family Law Act 1975.

According to Harry Phillips, the author of Crichton-Browne's entry in The Biographical Dictionary of the Australian Senate, "the circumstances of his retirement overshadowed his achievements as a senator, which included diligent and well-respected work as Deputy President and in committees".

=== Factional conflict, controversies and expulsion ===
Crichton-Browne remained influential in the Western Australian state politics after his election to the Senate, serving as Liberal campaign director. His supporters exercised control over party preselections, with the result that his factional opponents successfully supported an independent candidate, Liz Constable, against the endorsed Liberal candidate at the 1991 Floreat state by-election. Crichton-Browne was subsequently credited with influencing the replacement of state Liberal leader Barry MacKinnon with Charles Court's son Richard Court, who became premier following the 1993 state election.

In March 1995, during the Liberal preselection process for the next federal election, an anonymous pamphlet was distributed containing leaked details of a restraining order taken out against Crichton-Browne by his wife in 1989. Crichton-Browne nonetheless secured first position on the Liberal Party's ticket. Due to the resulting negative publicity, the party's federal leader John Howard subsequently requested that Crichton-Browne stand down from the ticket. He announced his resignation as deputy president of the Senate on 9 April 1995 and later publicly committed to retiring at the 1996 federal election.

At the Liberal Party state conference in July 1995, Crichton-Browne secured the election of David Honey, a "perceived protégé", as state president, which was viewed as a reassertion of his influence over the party. Several days later, Margo Kingston alleged in The Sydney Morning Herald that Crichton-Browne had behaved inappropriately towards a female journalist at the conference. Colleen Egan subsequently wrote that Crichton-Browne had told her "If you report how I vote I'll screw your tits off" and made other sexist remarks, while Jennifer Hewett wrote in the Australian Financial Review that Crichton-Browne had been visibly intoxicated and had a history of similar inappropriate remarks towards women.

Reporting of Crichton-Browne's remarks led many of his supporters to publicly distance themselves and seek his expulsion from the party. He was suspended from the federal Liberal partyroom on 4 August 1995 and was expelled by the Western Australian branch of the Liberal Party on 9 September 1995, with the expulsion motion moved by his former supporter David Honey. Crichton-Browne remained in parliament as an "independent Liberal" until the end of his Senate term on 30 June 1996. He used his final months in parliament to "refute accusations against him in the media and in state and federal parliament, and to uncover the origins of the smear campaign against him", including tabling a 54-page document regarding his expulsion from the Liberal Party.

== Fraud ==
In 1998, he pleaded guilty in the ACT Magistrates Court to fraudulently claiming $4,500 in taxpayer-funded expenses for two weekends spent at holiday spots with a female companion.
