= Jim McKiernan =

Irish-born Australian politician

Senator for Western Australia
- In office 1 December 1984 – 30 June 2002

Personal details
- Born: James Philip McKiernan; 11 October 1944 Cavan, Ireland
- Died: 10 August 2018 (aged 73) Perth, Western Australia, Australia
- Party: Australian Labor Party
- Spouse: Jackie Watkins (m. 1985) Jean McKiernan (m. 1966; div. 1983)
- Children: 3
- Occupation: Fitter, turner

James Philip McKiernan (11 October 1944 – 10 August 2018) was an Irish-born Australian politician. Born in Cavan, Ireland, he was the third of eight children. McKiernan was just 14 when he left school to help support his family. He said authorities turned a blind eye to this due to his father's illness, and he went out to work because he knew his family was relying on his income to survive. At Age 16 McKiernan moved to England to provide for his family further, and it was there he met his first wife Jean McKiernan née Webb. In 1969 McKiernan moved to Perth, Western Australia with Jean and their eldest child. He worked as a fitter and turner in Fremantle at the Dillingham Shipyards before entering into politics. In Australia he was a union education officer for the Australian Manufacturing Workers' Union from 1976 until 1984. In 1984, he was elected to the Australian Senate as a Labor Senator for Western Australia. A one-time convenor of the Left faction, McKiernan was the Labor Caucus' returning officer for the Hawke versus Keating leadership ballot. He remained in the Senate until his retirement in 2002. He was married to Western Australian state MP Jackie Watkins from 1985.

McKiernan died at his home in Perth on 10 August 2018 (aged 73). He is remembered by his children; Steven, Donna, and Jimmy; His step-children Lisa, Kim, Kate, and Ben; their partners, as well as 14 grandchildren and 2 great-grandchildren.
