= Peter Cook (Australian politician) =

Australian politician (1943–2005)

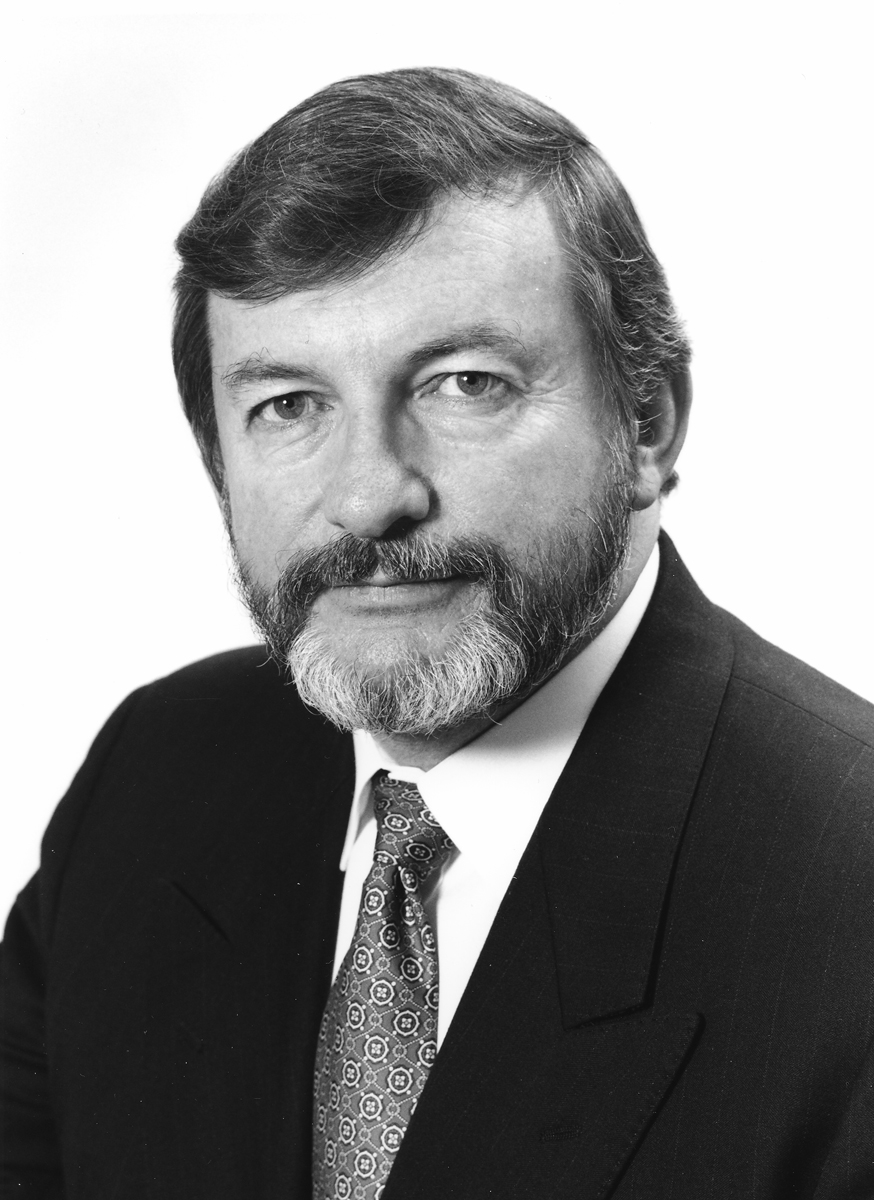

Senator for Western Australia
- In office 5 March 1983 – 30 June 2005

Personal details
- Born: Peter Francis Salmon Cook; 8 November 1943 Melbourne
- Died: 3 December 2005 (aged 62) Perth, Western Australia
- Party: Australian Labor Party

Peter Francis Salmon Cook (8 November 1943 – 3 December 2005) was an Australian politician. He served as a Labor member of the Senate from 1983 to 2005, representing the state of Western Australia.

== Career ==
Cook was born in Melbourne, Victoria, and was an active trade unionist before entering politics. He was Secretary of the Western Australian Trades and Labour Council 1975–83 and vice-president of the Australian Council of Trade Unions 1981–83. He was also a member of the Labor Party's National Executive.

He was elected to the Senate at the 1983 election; as this was a double dissolution election, his service commenced on election day, 5 March 1983 (although for the purpose of determining the rotation of senators it was taken to have commenced on the previous 1 July).

In the Hawke and Keating Labor governments he was Minister for Resources 1988–1990, Minister for Industrial Relations 1990–1993, Minister for Shipping and Aviation Support 1992–93, Minister for Trade 1993–1994 and Minister for Industry, Science and Technology 1994–96.

After the defeat of the Keating government in 1996, Cook was a member of the Opposition Shadow Ministry 1996–2001 and Deputy Leader of the Opposition in the Senate. In 1997–2001, he chaired a Senate Committee inquiry into the proposed Goods and Services Tax.

He was defeated by union organiser Glenn Sterle in a Labor preselection ballot before the 2004 election, and subsequently did not contest the election. His term expired on 30 June 2005. An avid ally of Julia Gillard, Cook publicly backed her for the Labor leadership after Mark Latham resigned in 2005.

== Death ==
Cook died on 3 December 2005 after being diagnosed with melanoma in July 2004. He is survived by his first wife Phillipa and their four Aboriginal children Kylie, Samantha, Bianca and Simon, their children and grand-children. The last Senate report to which he contributed was The cancer journey: Informing choice, handed down on 23 June 2005.

Political offices
Preceded by Peter Morris	Minister for Resources; 1988–90	Succeeded by Alan Griffiths
Preceded by Peter Morris	Minister for Industrial Relations; 1990–93	Succeeded by Laurie Brereton
Preceded by Lionel Bowen	Minister for Trade; 1993–94	Succeeded by Bob McMullan
Preceded by Alan Griffiths	Minister for Industry, Technology/ and Regional Development; Minister for Industry, Science and Technology; 1994–96	Succeeded by John Moore
