= Electoral results for the Australian Senate in Victoria =

This is a list of electoral results for the Australian Senate in Victoria since Federation in 1901.

== Election results ==
=== Elections in the 2020s ===
==== 2025 ====
The Victorian senators whose terms expire due to this election are as follows:

- The Hon Jane Hume (LP)
- Steph Hodgins-May (GRN) (appointed on 1 May 2024 to fill a casual vacancy caused by the resignation of Janet Rice)
- James Paterson (LP)
- Raff Ciccone (ALP)
- David Van (IND) (was elected as LP)
- Jess Walsh (ALP)

2025 Australian federal election: Senate, Victoria
Party	Candidate	Votes	%	±%
Quota		458,805		
Labor	1. Raff Ciccone (elected 1); 2. Jess Walsh (elected 3); 3. Michelle Ananda-Rajah; 4. Lynn Psaila; 5. Stephenie Kelley; 6. David Baker	1,146,725	34.91	+3.46
Liberal/National Coalition	1. James Paterson (elected 2); 2. Jane Hume (elected 4); 3. Kyle Hoppitt; 4. Glenn Arnold; 5. Greg Mirabella; 6. Chrestyna Kmetj	1,038,824	31.62	–0.67
Greens	1. Steph Hodgins-May (elected 5); 2. Navera Ari; 3. Rachel Iampolski; 4. Maddie Slater; 5. Brittney Henderson; 6. Nasser Yawari	405,934	12.36	−1.49
One Nation	1. Warren Pickering; 2. Christopher Bradbury	173,276	4.43	+1.48
Legalise Cannabis	1. Fiona Patten; 2. Alice Davy; 3. Shea Evans	116,793	3.56	+0.56
Trumpet of Patriots	1. James William Unkles; 2. Ron Jean; 3. Roger Ivan McKay	98,438	2.52	+2.15
Family First	1. Bernie Finn; 2. Jane Foreman	71,570	1.83	+1.83
Victorian Socialists	1. Jordan van den Lamb; 2. Steph Price	57,544	1.54	+0.97
Animal Justice	1. Helen Jeges; 2. Benjamin McMillan	49,187	1.50	−0.01
Shooters, Fishers, Farmers	1. Ethan Constantinou; 2. Ken Vickers	47,790	1.18	−0.12
People First–HEART joint ticket	1. Chris Neil; 2. Nick Clonaridis	42,013	1.08	+1.08
Australia's Voice	1. Mohamed El-Masri; 2. Harsimran Kaur; 3. Rasheed El Achkar	31,885	0.97	+0.97
Indigenous-Aboriginal	1. Racquel Austin-Abdullah; 2. Laylah Al-Saimary	20,842	0.63	+0.63
Libertarian	1. Jordan Dittloff; 2. Matthew Ford; 3. Stephen Matulec	19,058	0.58	+0.58
Democrats	1. Heath McKenzie; 2. Carly Noble	14,016	0.43	−0.32
Sustainable Australia	1. Celeste Ackerly; 2. Bert Jessup	10,198	0.26	−0.21
Citizens	1. Robert Barwick; 2. Sleiman Yohanna	8,127	0.25	+0.11
Fusion	1. Kammy Cordner Hunt; 2. Simon Mark Simcha Gnieslaw	8,046	0.24	−0.12
Group G	1. Keo Vongvixay; 2. Taylor Hernan	2,795	0.09	+0.09
Ungrouped	Heena Sinha Cheung; Susantha Abeysinghe; Viesha Lewand; Lawrence Harvey; Cory Corbett; K. Black; David Van; Nate Ritter	2,677	0.08	−0.14
Group T	1. Raj Saini; 2. Kirti Alle; 3. Yashaswini Srinivas Kanakagiri	1,594	0.05	+0.05
Total formal votes		3,285,084	95.87	−0.61
Informal votes		141,580	4.13	+0.61
Turnout		3,426,664	74.81	−16.46

Results are not final. Last updated on 13 May 2025 at 12:00 AM AEST.

==== 2022 ====
2022 Australian federal election: Senate, Victoria
Party	Candidate	Votes	%	±%
Quota		545,935		
Liberal/National Coalition	1. Sarah Henderson (elected 1); 2. Bridget McKenzie (elected 3); 3. Greg Mirabella; 4. Chrestyna Kmetj; 5. Mick Harrington; 6. David Burgess	1,233,930	32.29	–3.61
Labor	1. Linda White (elected 2); 2. Jana Stewart (elected 4); 3. Casey Nunn; 4. Megan Bridger-Darling; 5. Josh McFarlane	1,201,830	31.45	+0.33
Greens	1. Lidia Thorpe (elected 5); 2. Adam Frogley; 3. Sissy Austin; 4. Zeb Payne	529,429	13.85	+3.23
United Australia	1. Ralph Babet (elected 6); 2. Kelly Moran; 3. Kenneth Grimmond	153,231	4.01	+1.53
Legalise Cannabis	1. Elissa Smith; 2. Wayne Taylor	114,805	3.00	+1.50
One Nation	1. Warren Pickering; 2. Stuart Huxham	111,176	2.91	+0.06
Liberal Democrats	1. David Limbrick; 2. Krystle Mitchell; 3. Caroline White	92,295	2.42	+1.46
Animal Justice	1. Bronwyn Currie; 2. Chris Delforce	57,836	1.51	–0.02
Justice	1. Derryn Hinch; 2. Ruth Stanfield	54,366	1.42	–1.40
Shooters, Fishers, Farmers	1. Ethan Constantinou; 2. Nicole Bourman	49,750	1.30	–0.55
Reason	1. Yolanda Vega; 2. Harry Millward	37,402	0.98	+0.98
Democrats	1. Leonie Green; 2. Stephen Jagoe	28,693	0.75	+0.49
Victorian Socialists	1. Aran Mylvaganam; 2. Laura Riccardi	21,739	0.57	+0.57
Sustainable Australia	1. Madeleine Wearne; 2. Robert Long	17,594	0.46	+0.08
Group R	1. Morgan Jonas; 2. Monica Smit	15,057	0.39	+0.39
Fusion	1. Kammy Cordner-Hunt; 2. Tahlia Farrant	13,920	0.36	+0.36
Great Australian	1. Darryl O'Bryan; 2. Geoff Whitehead	13,648	0.36	+0.22
Federation	1. Vern Hughes; 2. Karen Kim; 3. Cheryl Lacey; 4. Chris Mara; 5. Neerja Sewak; 6. Mark O'Connell	12,357	0.32	+0.32
Group B	1. Damien Richardson; 2. John McBride	12,161	0.32	+0.32
Australian Values	1. Chris Burson; 2. Samantha Asser	11,809	0.31	+0.31
Informed Medical Options	1. Nick Clonaridis; 2. Robyn Curnow	8,134	0.21	+0.21
Socialist Alliance	1. Felix Dance; 2. Angela Carr	6,841	0.18	+0.18
Progressives	1. Antoinette Pitt; 2. David Knight	5,307	0.14	+0.14
Citizens	1. Robbie Barwick; 2. Craig Isherwood	5,206	0.14	+0.05
Group T	1. Susan Benedyka; 2. Christine Richards	3,768	0.10	+0.10
Socialist Equality	1. Peter Byrne; 2. Jason Wardle	1,003	0.03	+0.03
Ungrouped	Glenn Floyd (Liberty); Allen Ridgeway; James Bond; Neal Smith; Max Dicks; Bernardine Atkinson; Paul Ross; Nat de Francesco; Joseph Toscano; Tara Tran; David Dillon; Geraldine Gonslavez	8,252	0.22	+0.15
Total formal votes		3,821,539	96.48	+0.50
Informal votes		139,419	3.52	−0.50
Turnout		3,960,958	91.27	–1.85
Party total seats			Seats	±
Liberal			4	▼1
National			1	Steady
Labor			4	Steady
Greens			2	Steady
United Australia			1	▲1

#	Senator	Party
1	Sarah Henderson	Liberal
2	Linda White	Labor
3	Bridget McKenzie	National
4	Jana Stewart	Labor
5	Lidia Thorpe	Greens
6	Ralph Babet	UAP

=== Elections in the 2010s ===
==== 2019 ====
2019 Australian federal election: Senate, Victoria
Party	Candidate	Votes	%	±%
Quota		534,207		
Liberal/National Coalition	1. James Paterson (elected 1); 2. Jane Hume (elected 3); 3. David Van (elected 6); 4. Anita Rank; 5. Kyle Hoppitt; 6. Julian Mulcahy	1,342,362	35.90	+2.79
Labor	1. Raff Ciccone (elected 2); 2. Jess Walsh (elected 4); 3. Gavin Marshall; 4. Parvinder Sarwara; 5. Karen Douglas; 6. Louise Crawford	1,163,853	31.12	+0.39
Greens	1. Janet Rice (elected 5); 2. Apsara Sabaratnam; 3. Claire Proctor; 4. Nakita Thomson; 5. Alice Barnes; 6. Judy Cameron	397,133	10.62	−0.25
One Nation	1. James Hallam; 2. Ian Cameron	106,742	2.85	+1.04
Justice	1. Derryn Hinch; 2. Simone O'Brien	105,459	2.82	−3.23
Democratic Labour	1. Jennifer Bowden; 2. Chris McCormack; 3. Kathryn Breakwell	94,720	2.53	+2.01
United Australia	1. Catriona Thoolen; 2. Katie O'Connor; 3. Roger McKay	92,691	2.48	+2.48
Shooters, Fishers, Farmers	1. Ricky Muir; 2. Damian Stock	69,322	1.85	+0.80
Animal Justice	1. Ben Schultz; 2. Fiona McRostie	57,287	1.53	−0.21
HEMP	1. Frances Hood; 2. Heather Gladman	56,117	1.50	+1.50
Liberal Democrats	1. Robert Kennedy; 2. Kirsty O'Sullivan	35,719	0.96	−0.63
Conservatives	1. Kevin Bailey; 2. Nina van Strijp; 3. Trent Thomas	24,443	0.65	+0.65
Christian Democrats	1. Bob Payne; 2. Kevin Murphy	18,791	0.50	+0.23
Small Business	1. Simon Kemp; 2. Peter Graham	18,534	0.50	+0.50
Conservative National	1. Bruce Stevens; 2. Rita Mazalevskis; 3. Benjamin Williamson	16,585	0.44	+0.44
ICAN	1. Paul Wittwer; 2. Kammy Cordner Hunt	15,183	0.41	+0.41
Pirate	1. Tania Briese; 2. Shannon Smith	15,043	0.40	+0.02
Sustainable Australia	1. Allan Doensen; 2. Madeleine Wearne	14,133	0.38	+0.08
Health Australia	1. Isaac Golden; 2. Andrew Hicks	12,899	0.34	−0.15
Socialist Equality	1. Tessa Pietsch; 2. Jason Wardle	12,415	0.33	+0.24
Climate Action!	1. Philip Ayton; 2. Monika Kompara	12,363	0.33	+0.33
Australian Workers	1. Narelle Everard; 2. Kevin Gaynor	10,710	0.29	+0.29
Democrats	1. David Collyer; 2. Marc Williams	9,760	0.26	+0.26
Republican	1. Geoff Lutz; 2. Peter Consandine	7,762	0.21	+0.21
Rise Up Australia	1. Rosalie Crestani; 2. Danny Nalliah	6,591	0.18	−0.11
Great Australian	1. Darryl O'Bryan; 2. Helen Edwards	5,194	0.14	+0.14
Secular	1. Harris Sultan; 2. John Perkins	4,001	0.11	+0.04
Citizens Electoral Council	1. Craig Isherwood; 2. Gabrielle Peut	3,251	0.09	+0.03
Group Z	1. Sunny Chandra; 2. Robert Whitehill	3,138	0.08	+0.08
VOTEFLUX.ORG	1. Dustin Perry; 2. Seb Carrie-Wilson	2,418	0.06	−0.02
Yellow Vest Australia	1. Daniel Jones; 2. Kenneth Nicholls	2,229	0.06	−0.60
Ungrouped	Kenneth Betts; Max Dicks; Murray McInnis; Karl Morris	2,595	0.07	−0.01
Total formal votes		3,739,443	95.98	+0.18
Informal votes		156,793	4.02	−0.18
Turnout		3,896,236	93.12	+0.95

Elected	#	Senator	Party
2019	1	James Paterson	Liberal
2019	2	Raff Ciccone	Labor
2019	3	Jane Hume	Liberal
2019	4	Jess Walsh	Labor
2019	5	Janet Rice	Greens
2019	6	David Van	Liberal
2016
2016	1	Mitch Fifield	Liberal
2016	2	Kim Carr	Labor
2016	3	Richard Di Natale	Greens
2016	4	Bridget McKenzie	National
2016	5	Kimberley Kitching	Labor
2016	6	Scott Ryan	Liberal

==== 2016 ====
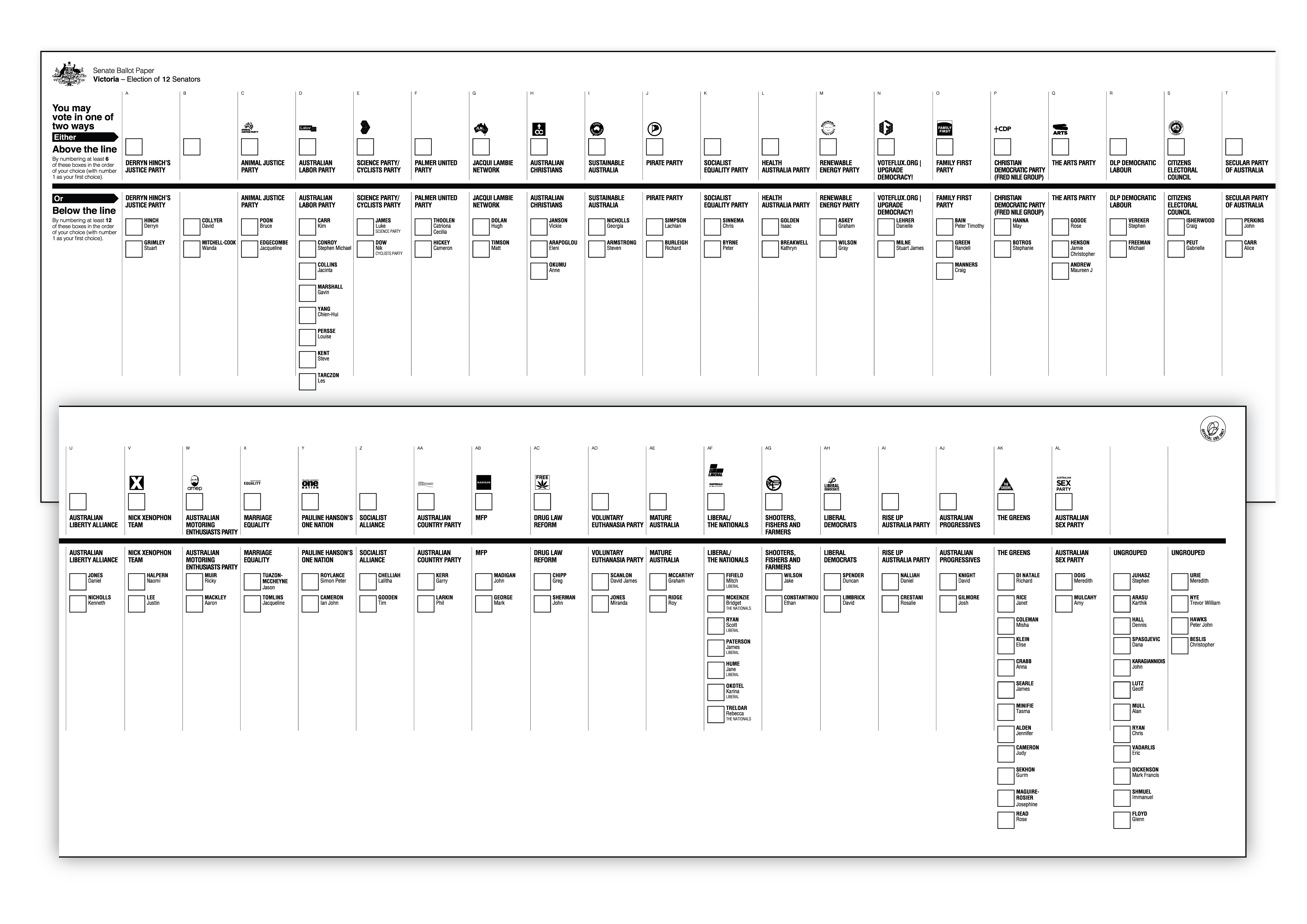
Senate ballot paper used in Victoria for 2016.

2016 Australian federal election: Senate, Victoria
Party	Candidate	Votes	%	±%
Quota		269,250		
Liberal/National Coalition	1. Mitch Fifield (elected 1); 2. Bridget McKenzie (elected 4); 3. Scott Ryan (elected 6); 4. James Paterson (elected 8); 5. Jane Hume (elected 12); 6. Karina Okotel; 7. Rebecca Treloar	1,158,800	33.11	−7.02
Labor	1. Kim Carr (elected 2); 1. Stephen Conroy (elected 5); 3. Jacinta Collins (elected 7); 4. Gavin Marshall (elected 9); 5. Jennifer Yang; 6. Louise Persse; 7. Steve Kent; 8. Les Tarczon	1,075,658	30.73	−1.72
Greens	1. Richard Di Natale (elected 3); 2. Janet Rice (elected 11); 3. Misha Coleman; 4. Elise Klein; 5. Anna Crabb; 6. James Searle; 7. Tasma Minifie; 8. Jennifer Alden; 9. Judy Cameron; 10. Gurm Sekhon; 11. Josephine Maguire-Rosier; 12. Rose Read	380,499	10.87	+0.03
Justice	1. Derryn Hinch (elected 10); 2. Stuart Grimley	211,733	6.05	+6.05
One Nation	1. Simon Roylance; 2. Ian Cameron	63,528	1.81	+1.80
Animal Justice	1. Bruce Poon; 2. Jacqueline Edgecombe	60,780	1.74	+0.99
Liberal Democrats	1. Duncan Spender; 2. David Limbrick	55,501	1.59	+1.58
Xenophon	1. Naomi Halpern; 2. Justin Lee	55,118	1.57	+1.57
Sex Party	1. Meredith Doig; 2. Amy Mulcahy	54,128	1.55	−0.34
Family First	1. Peter Bain; 2. Randell Green; 3. Craig Manners	39,747	1.14	−0.39
Shooters, Fishers, Farmers	1. Jake Wilson; 2. Ethan Constantinou	36,669	1.05	+0.22
Christians	1. Vickie Janson; 2. Eleni Arapoglou; 3. Anne Okumu	34,763	0.99	+0.50
Motoring Enthusiasts	1. Ricky Muir; 2. Aaron Mackley	31,785	0.91	+0.40
Drug Law Reform	1. Greg Chipp; 2. John Sherman	23,384	0.67	+0.55
Liberty Alliance	1. Daniel Jones; 2. Kenneth Nicholls	23,080	0.66	+0.66
Democratic Labour	1. Stephen Vereker; 2. Michael Freeman	18,152	0.52	−0.19
Health Australia	1. Isaac Golden; 2. Kathryn Breakwell	17,169	0.49	+0.49
Marriage Equality	1. Jason Tuazon-McCheyne; 2. Jacqueline Tomlins	17,139	0.49	+0.49
Lambie	1. Hugh Dolan; 2. Matt Timson	15,288	0.44	+0.44
Pirate	1. Lachlan Simpson; 2. Richard Burleigh	13,424	0.38	+0.01
Science–Cyclists joint ticket	1. Luke James; 2. Nik Dow	11,567	0.33	+0.33
Sustainable Australia	1. Georgia Nicholls; 2. Steven Armstrong	10,574	0.30	+0.18
Palmer United	1. Catriona Thoolen; 2. Cameron Hickey	10,456	0.30	−3.36
Rise Up Australia	1. Danny Nalliah; 2. Rosalie Crestani	10,166	0.29	−0.63
Country	1. Garry Kerr; 2. Phil Larkin	9,316	0.27	+0.27
Christian Democrats	1. May Hanna; 2. Stephanie Botros	9,287	0.27	+0.27
Renewable Energy	1. Graham Askey; 2. Gray Wilson	8,845	0.25	+0.25
Arts	1. Rose Godde; 2. Jamie Henson; 3. Maureen Andrew	7,737	0.22	+0.22
Voluntary Euthanasia	1. David Scanlon; 2. Miranda Jones	5,768	0.16	+0.16
MFP	1. John Madigan; 2. Mark George	5,268	0.15	+0.15
Mature Australia	1. Graham McCarthy; 2. Roy Ridge	3,469	0.10	+0.10
Group B	1. David Collyer; 2. Wanda Mitchell-Cook	3,386	0.10	+0.10
Socialist Equality	1. Chris Sinnema; 2. Peter Byrne	3,293	0.09	+0.02
VOTEFLUX.ORG	1. Danielle Lehrer; 2. Stuart Milne	2,838	0.08	+0.08
Socialist Alliance	1. Lalitha Chelliah; 2. Tim Gooden	2,597	0.07	+0.07
Secular	1. John Perkins; 2. Alice Carr	2,303	0.07	−0.06
Citizens Electoral Council	1. Craig Isherwood; 2. Gabrielle Peut	2,098	0.06	+0.02
Progressives	1. David Knight; 2. Josh Gilmore	2,064	0.06	+0.06
Ungrouped	Stephen Juhasz; Karthik Arasu; Dennis Hall; Dana Spasojevic; John Karagiannidis; Geoff Lutz; Allan Mull; Chris Ryan; Eric Vadarlis; Mark Dickenson; Immanuel Shmuel; Glenn Floyd; Meredith Urie; Trevor Nye; Peter Hawks; Christopher Beslis	2,860	0.08	−0.10
Total formal votes		3,500,237	95.80	−0.83
Informal votes		153,499	4.20	+0.83
Turnout		3,653,736	92.18	−1.87

#	Senator	Party
1	Mitch Fifield	Liberal
2	Kim Carr	Labor
3	Richard Di Natale	Greens
4	Bridget McKenzie	National
5	Stephen Conroy	Labor
6	Scott Ryan	Liberal
7	Jacinta Collins	Labor
8	James Paterson	Liberal
9	Gavin Marshall	Labor
10	Derryn Hinch	Justice
11	Janet Rice	Greens
12	Jane Hume	Liberal

==== 2013 ====
2013 Australian federal election: Senate, Victoria
Party	Candidate	Votes	%	±%
Quota		483,076		
Liberal/National Coalition	1. Mitch Fifield (elected 1); 2. Scott Ryan (elected 3); 3. Helen Kroger; 4. Martin Corboy	1,357,153	40.13	+5.72
Labor	1. Gavin Marshall (elected 2); 2. Jacinta Collins (elected 4); 3. Mehmet Tillem; 4. Lynn Psaila; 5. Terry Larkins; 6. Jamie Mileto	1,097,255	32.45	−5.30
Greens	1. Janet Rice (elected 5); 2. Trent McCarthy; 3. Huong Truong; 4. Ian Christoe; 5. Gurm Sekhon; 6. Robert Humphreys	366,720	10.84	−3.80
Palmer United	1. Barry Michael; 2. Doug Hawkins; 3. Penny Palman	123,889	3.66	+3.66
Sex Party	1. Fiona Patten; 2. Ange Hopkins	63,883	1.89	−0.37
Family First	1. Ashley Fenn; 2. Trudie Morris	51,658	1.53	−1.11
Wikileaks	1. Julian Assange; 2. Leslie Cannold; 3. Binoy Kampmark	41,926	1.24	+1.24
Rise Up Australia	1. Daniel Nalliah; 2. Rosalie Crestani	31,000	0.92	+0.92
Shooters and Fishers	1. Terry Maloney; 2. Steve Malcolm	28,220	0.83	−0.56
Animal Justice	1. Bruce Poon; 2. Sarah Davison	25,470	0.75	+0.75
Democratic Labour	1. Mark Farrell; 2. Stephanie Mazzarella	23,883	0.71	−1.62
HEMP	1. Matt Riley; 2. Ryan Fletcher	20,084	0.59	+0.59
Motoring Enthusiasts	1. Ricky Muir (elected 6); 2. Craig Gill	17,122	0.51	+0.51
Christians	1. Vickie Janson; 2. Frank Papafotiou	16,523	0.49	+0.49
Fishing and Lifestyle	1. Joe Zammit; 2. Richard Abela	16,186	0.48	+0.48
Katter's Australian	1. Geoff Herbert; 2. Joanne Rolls	15,535	0.46	+0.46
Pirate	1. Joseph Miles; 2. Geoffrey Hammett	12,591	0.37	+0.37
Australian Independents	1. Samantha Shaw; 2. Yvonne Wood	11,462	0.34	+0.34
Democrats	1. David Collyer; 2. Roger Howe; 3. Sarina Isgro; 4. Greg Raines; 5. Robert Livesay; 6. Richard Grummet	10,877	0.32	−0.17
Senator Online	1. Lloyd Taylor; 2. Tony Smith	5,966	0.18	+0.11
Country Alliance	1. Andrew Jones; 2. Garry Kerr	5,164	0.15	+0.15
Climate Sceptics	1. Chris Dawson; 2. John Rodda	5,104	0.15	0.00
Bullet Train	1. Mark Erwood; 2. Steve Phillips	5,012	0.15	+0.15
Secular	1. John Perkins; 2. Rosemary Sceats	4,379	0.13	+0.02
Drug Law Reform	1. Greg Chipp; 2. John Sherman	4,095	0.12	+0.12
Stable Population	1. Clifford Hayes; 2. Jill Quirk	3,952	0.12	+0.12
Building Australia	1. Darren Evans; 2. Samuel White	2,937	0.09	−0.06
Australian Voice	1. Immanuel Shmuel; 2. Vern Hughes	2,503	0.07	+0.07
Socialist Equality	1. Patrick O'Connor; 2. Tania Baptist	2,332	0.07	−0.25
Bank Reform	1. Maria Rigoni; 2. Paul Rigoni	1,828	0.05	+0.05
Group T	1. Joseph Toscano; 2. Beth Matthews	1,637	0.05	+0.05
Stop CSG	1. Roger Thorrowgood; 2. Adele Van Rosmalen	1,408	0.04	+0.04
Citizens Electoral Council	1. Craig Isherwood; 2. Robert Barwick	1,401	0.04	−0.03
Group AJ	1. Bob Nicholls; 2. Kylie Nicholls; 3. Peter Webb	551	0.02	+0.02
Independent	Lyn Gunter	491	0.01	+0.01
Outdoor Recreation	1. Simon Christie; 2. Terry Destry	398	0.01	+0.01
Liberal Democrats	1. Peter Whelan; 2. Tim Wilms	363	0.01	−1.80
One Nation	1. Dale Townsend; 2. Rosalie Townsend	242	0.01	−0.30
Independent	Darrell Morrison	213	0.01	+0.01
Smokers Rights	1. Abe Salt; 2. Janos Beregszaszi	78	0.00	+0.00
Republican	1. Peter Consandine; 2. Clinton Portors	38	0.00	+0.00
Total formal votes		3,381,529	96.63	+0.57
Informal votes		117,909	3.37	−0.57
Turnout		3,499,438	94.08	+0.01

Elected	#	Senator	Party
2013	1	Mitch Fifield	Liberal
2013	2	Gavin Marshall	Labor
2013	3	Scott Ryan	Liberal
2013	4	Jacinta Collins	Labor
2013	5	Janet Rice	Greens
2013	6	Ricky Muir	Motoring
2010
2010	1	Kim Carr	Labor
2010	2	Michael Ronaldson	Liberal
2010	3	Richard Di Natale	Greens
2010	4	Stephen Conroy	Labor
2010	5	Bridget McKenzie	National
2010	6	John Madigan	DLP

==== 2010 ====
2010 Australian federal election: Senate, Victoria
Party	Candidate	Votes	%	±%
Quota		459,822		
Labor	1. Kim Carr (elected 1); 2. Stephen Conroy (elected 4); 3. Antony Thow; 4. Marg Lewis; 5. Shelly Freeman	1,215,213	37.75	−3.95
Liberal/National Coalition	1. Michael Ronaldson (Lib) (elected 2); 2. Bridget McKenzie (Nat) (elected 5); 3. Julian McGauran (Lib); 4. Susan Jennison (Lib)	1,107,522	34.41	−5.09
Greens	1. Richard Di Natale (elected 3); 2. Janet Rice; 3. Nam Bui; 4. Jen Hargrave; 5. Julie Rivendell; 6. Liezl Shnookal	471,317	14.64	+4.56
Family First	1. Steve Fielding; 2. Gary Plumridge; 3. Ann Bown Seeley; 4. Yuli Goh; 5. Joyce Khoo	85,058	2.64	+0.12
Democratic Labor	1. John Madigan (elected 6); 2. Geraldine Gonsalvez; 3. John Kavanagh	75,145	2.33	+1.30
Sex Party	1. Fiona Patten; 2. Emma Wilson; 3. Katie Blakey	72,899	2.26	+2.26
Liberal Democrats	1. Ross Currie; 2. Graeme Klass	59,116	1.84	+1.74
Shooters and Fishers	1. Peter Kelly; 2. Alex Krstic	44,639	1.39	+0.72
Democrats	1. Roger Howe; 2. Rick Westgarth	15,858	0.49	−1.16
Christian Democrats	1. Vickie Janson; 2. Ben Eddy-Veitz	12,330	0.38	+0.16
One Nation	1. Rosalyn Townsend; 2. Philip Townsend	12,094	0.38	−0.04
Socialist Equality	1. Patrick O'Connor; 2. Keo Vongvixay	10,237	0.32	+0.24
	1. Stephen Mayne; 2. Paula Piccinini	6,021	0.19	+0.19
Carers Alliance	1. Christopher Monteagle; 2. Wendy Peacock	5,425	0.17	+0.05
Climate Sceptics	1. Chris Dawson; 2. Lee Holmes	4,908	0.15	+0.15
Building Australia	1. Darren Evans; 2. Sam White	4,898	0.15	+0.15
	1. Joseph Toscano; 2. Jenny Warfe; 3. Andrew Sadauskas	3,906	0.12	+0.12
Secular	1. John Perkins; 2. Rosemary Sceats	3,480	0.11	+0.11
Socialist Alliance	1. Margarita Windisch; 2. Sharon Firebrace; 3. Ron Guy	3,075	0.10	+0.02
Senator On-Line	1. Glenn Sargent; 2. Emma Wardle	2,394	0.07	−0.03
Citizens Electoral Council	1. Doug Mitchell; 2. Katherine Isherwood	2,332	0.07	+0.02
Independent	Grant Beale	615	0.02	+0.02
Independent	Glenn Shea	269	0.01	+0.01
Total formal votes		3,218,751	96.06	−0.66
Informal votes		131,919	3.94	+0.66
Turnout		3,350,670	94.07	−1.53

Elected	#	Senator	Party
2010	1	Kim Carr	Labor
2010	2	Michael Ronaldson	Liberal
2010	3	Richard Di Natale	Greens
2010	4	Stephen Conroy	Labor
2010	5	Bridget McKenzie	National
2010	6	John Madigan	DLP
2007
2007	1	Jacinta Collins	Labor
2007	2	Mitch Fifield	Liberal
2007	3	Gavin Marshall	Labor
2007	4	Helen Kroger	Liberal
2007	5	Scott Ryan	Liberal
2007	6	David Feeney	Labor

The primary vote saw the Coalition win two seats, Labor win two seats and the Greens win one seat, leaving Labor leading for the final seat with a comfortable majority ahead of the Coalition, Family First, DLP and Australian Sex Party. It ended up being a tight race for the final senate seat in Victoria, with preferences from One Nation and the Christian Democrats saw the DLP move ahead of Family First into third place, but Australian Democrat and Liberal Democrat preferences saw the DLP getting overtaken by the Sex Party. However, the Sex Party was overtaken once again by the DLP's Family First preferences, and Sex Party preferences saw the DLP move into second place ahead of the Coalition, whose preferences allowed the DLP to overtake Labor to secure the sixth seat. The final results were two seats Coalition, two seats Labor, one seat Green and one seat Democratic Labor.

=== Elections in the 2000s ===
==== 2007 ====
Elected	#	Senator	Party
2007	1	Jacinta Collins	Labor
2007	2	Mitch Fifield	Liberal
2007	3	Gavin Marshall	Labor
2007	4	Helen Kroger	Liberal
2007	5	Scott Ryan	Liberal
2007	6	David Feeney	Labor
2004
2004	1	Michael Ronaldson	Liberal
2004	2	Kim Carr	Labor
2004	3	Julian McGauran	Liberal
2004	4	Stephen Conroy	Labor
2004	5	Judith Troeth	Liberal
2004	6	Steve Fielding	Family First

2007 Australian federal election: Senate, Victoria
Party	Candidate	Votes	%	±%
Quota		454,625		
Labor	1. Jacinta Collins (elected 1); 2. Gavin Marshall (elected 3); 3. David Feeney (elected 6); 4. Marg Lewis	1,327,076	41.70	+5.58
Liberal/National Coalition	1. Mitch Fifield (Lib) (elected 2); 2. Helen Kroger (Lib) (elected 4); 3. Scott Ryan (Lib) (elected 5); 4. Simon Swayn (Nat)	1,257,149	39.50	−4.60
Greens	1. Richard Di Natale; 2. Jenny O'Connor; 3. Alexandra Bhathal; 4. Jim Reiher; 5. Hoa Pham; 6. Emma Henley	320,759	10.08	+1.28
Family First	1. Gary Plumridge; 2. Miriam Rawson; 3. Monique Podbury; 4. Chris Willis; 5. Clare Heath; 6. Ann Bown Seeley	80,100	2.52	+0.64
Democrats	1. Lyn Allison; 2. Greg Chipp; 3. Jo McCubbin	52,596	1.65	−0.21
Democratic Labor	1. John Mulholland; 2. Gerry Flood; 3. Pat La Manna; 4. Teresa Evelyn-Liardet; 5. Ken Wells; 6. Paul Crea	32,930	1.03	−0.91
Climate Change	1. Ainslie Howard; 2. Sashikala Rozairo	24,759	0.78	+0.78
Shooters	1. Brett Parker; 2. Matt Graham	21,398	0.67	+0.67
What Women Want	1. Madeleine Love; 2. Robyn Thompson	14,028	0.44	+0.44
One Nation	1. Nick Steel; 2. Daniel Shore	13,354	0.42	−0.30
Christian Democrats	1. Ewan McDonald; 2. Dallas Clarnette	7,100	0.22	−0.12
Group I	1. Joseph Toscano; 2. Jude Pierce	5,695	0.18	+0.18
Climate Conservatives	1. Steve Raskovy; 2. Viesha Lewand	4,216	0.13	+0.13
Carers Alliance	1. Junelle Rhodes; 2. Peter Gibilisco; 3. Patricia Karadimos	3,901	0.12	+0.12
Senator On-Line	1. Robert Rose; 2. Jeremy Barrett	3,106	0.10	+0.10
Liberty & Democracy	1. Steve Clancy; 2. Geoff Saw	3,044	0.10	+0.10
Socialist Alliance	1. Margarita Windisch; 2. Jeremy Smith	2,535	0.08	−0.08
Socialist Equality	1. Peter Byrne; 2. Tania Baptist	2,403	0.08	+0.08
Citizens Electoral Council	1. Rachel Affleck; 2. Katherine Isherwood	1,697	0.05	−0.49
Non-Custodial Parents	1. Brendan Hall; 2. John Zabaneh	1,511	0.05	−0.06
Secular	1. John Perkins; 2. Andrew Conway	1,238	0.04	+0.04
Group T	1. Joseph Kaliniy; 2. Koulla Mesaritis	522	0.02	+0.02
Group V	1. Tony Klein; 2. Amanda Klein	503	0.02	+0.02
Independent	Norman Walker	383	0.01	+0.01
Independent	Tejay Sener	185	0.01	+0.01
Independent	Darryl O'Bryan	133	0.00	+0.00
One Nation	Llewellyn Groves	48	0.00	+0.00
Total formal votes		3,182,369	96.72	+1.85
Informal votes		107,850	3.28	−1.85
Turnout		3,290,219	95.60	+0.17

Labor once again narrowly finished ahead of the Coalition on primary votes with around 40% each. Both parties won two seats each on primary vote alone, with another two seats yet to be won. The Greens finished with just over 10% of the vote. After preferences from small minor parties, Labor managed to stay ahead of the Greens and Coalition. Preferences from the Democrats allowed the Greens to go ahead of the Coalition and close to the required number of votes to win a seat. However, preferences from Family First allowed the Coalition to win a third seat whilst Labor narrowly won the remaining seat over the Greens. The end result was three seats each to the Coalition and Labor

==== 2004 ====
Elected	#	Senator	Party
2004	1	Michael Ronaldson	Liberal
2004	2	Kim Carr	Labor
2004	3	Julian McGauran	National
2004	4	Stephen Conroy	Labor
2004	5	Judith Troeth	Liberal
2004	6	Steve Fielding	Family First
2001
2001	1	Mitch Fifield	Liberal
2001	2	Robert Ray	Labor
2001	3	Rod Kemp	Liberal
2001	4	Gavin Marshall	Labor
2001	5	Kay Patterson	Liberal
2001	6	Lyn Allison	Democrats

2004 Australian federal election: Senate, Victoria
Party	Candidate	Votes	%	±%
Quota		428,085		
Liberal/National Coalition	1. Michael Ronaldson (Lib) (elected 1); 2. Julian McGauran (Nat) (elected 3); 3. Judith Troeth (Lib) (elected 5); 4. Dino De Marchi (Lib); 5. Jim Forbes (Lib); 6. Eugene Notermans (Lib)	1,321,445	44.10	+4.49
Labor	1. Kim Carr (elected 2); 2. Stephen Conroy (elected 4); 3. Jacinta Collins; 4. Marg Lewis	1,082,271	36.12	−0.67
Greens	1. David Risstrom; 2. Richard Di Natale; 3. Pamela Curr; 4. Liz Conor; 5. Sue Pennicuik; 6. Berhan Ahmed	263,551	8.80	+2.81
Democratic Labor	1. John Mulholland; 2. Pat Crea; 3. Gail King; 4. Rosemary Maurus; 5. Ken Wells	58,042	1.94	−0.34
Family First	1. Steve Fielding (elected 6); 2. Danny Nalliah; 3. Annette Blaze; 4. Allan Meyer; 5. Ann Bown	56,376	1.88	+1.88
Democrats	1. Jess Healy; 2. Greg Chipp; 3. Tony Inglese; 4. Jo McCubbin	55,867	1.86	−5.96
Liberals for Forests	1. Steve Clancy; 2. Rad Wintle	55,170	1.84	−0.56
One Nation	1. Tim Foster; 2. James Neary	21,532	0.72	−1.73
Pensioners	1. Graeme Cleaves; 2. Ian Kleeman	17,401	0.58	+0.58
Citizens Electoral Council	1. Craig Isherwood; 2. Kelly-Ann Paull	16,227	0.54	+0.45
Christian Democrats	1. Alan Barron; 2. Phil Seymour	10,239	0.34	−0.25
Veterans	1. Roger Tozer; 2. Pam Brown	8,601	0.29	+0.29
Group S	1. Richard Frankland; 2. Peter Phelps; 3. John Harding	7,266	0.24	+0.24
Socialist Alliance	1. Lalitha Chelliah; 2. Sue Bolton	4,906	0.16	+0.16
Republican	1. Peter Consandine; 2. Sheila Newman	4,168	0.14	+0.14
Independent	1. Joseph Toscano; 2. Steven Reghenzani	3,418	0.11	+0.11
Non-Custodial Parents	1. Kevin Boers; 2. Brendan Hall	3,310	0.11	+0.11
Hope	1. Tim Petherbridge; 2. Lee-Anne Poynton	2,938	0.10	+0.01
Progressive Alliance	1. Chris Grigsby; 2. Charles Williams	2,453	0.08	+0.08
Independent	Phillip Mason	478	0.02	+0.02
Independent	Che Endra Che-Kahn	212	0.01	+0.01
Independent	Harald Dreger	192	0.01	+0.01
Independent	Judi-ann Leggetts	168	0.01	+0.01
Independent	Barry Walters	161	0.01	+0.01
Independent	David Buck	80	0.00	+0.00
Independent	Glenn Floyd	71	0.00	+0.00
Independent	John Tibble	51	0.00	+0.00
Total formal votes		2,996,594	94.87	+0.47
Informal votes		162,047	5.13	−0.47
Turnout		3,158,641	95.43	−0.61

Primary votes ensured that the Coalition secured three senate seats and Labor secured two. This left the Greens leading with Labor not far behind as preferences began counting. In an attempt to protect their third candidate, Jacinta Collins, Labor made a deal with several groups including the Democratic Labor Party, Family First Party and the Christian Democrats where they would preference her ahead of the Coalition in exchange for Labor preferences, expecting them to be eliminated before these preferences could be distributed. However, it backfired badly as the Family First Party, despite starting with less than two percent of the primary vote, received many preferences from the Christian Democrats, the Aged and Disability Pensioners Party, One Nation, the Coalition, liberals for forests, the Australian Democrats and the Democratic Labor Party that easily put Family First ahead of Labor. And, as per the Jacinta Collins deal, the majority of the Labor preferences went to Family First too, meaning that Steve Fielding was comfortably elected ahead of Greens candidate David Risstrom. The result was three seats Coalition, two seats Labor and one seat Family First.

==== 2001 ====
Elected	#	Senator	Party
2001	1	Richard Alston	Liberal
2001	2	Robert Ray	Labor
2001	3	Rod Kemp	Liberal
2001	4	Gavin Marshall	Labor
2001	5	Kay Patterson	Liberal
2001	6	Lyn Allison	Democrats
1998
1998	1	Stephen Conroy	Labor
1998	2	Judith Troeth	Liberal
1998	3	Kim Carr	Labor
1998	4	Julian McGauran	National
1998	5	Jacinta Collins	Labor
1998	6	Tsebin Tchen	Liberal

2001 Australian federal election: Senate, Victoria
Party	Candidate	Votes	%	±%
Quota		416,896		
Coalition	1. Richard Alston (Lib) (elected 1); 2. Rod Kemp (Lib) (elected 3); 3. Kay Patterson (Lib) (elected 5); 4. Tim Hawker (Nat); 5. Dino de Marchi (Lib); 6. Duc-Dung Tran (Lib)	1,155,817	39.61	+1.8
Labor	1. Robert Ray (elected 2); 2. Gavin Marshall (elected 4); 3. Ted Murphy; 4. Robert Chong	1,073,632	36.79	−3.7
Democrats	1. Lyn Allison (elected 6); 2. Pierre Harcourt; 3. David Wark; 4. Simone Alesich	228,212	7.82	−2.0
Greens	1. Scott Kinnear; 2. Eleisha Mullane; 3. Dinesh Mathew; 4. Liz Conor	174,756	4.36	+3.5
One Nation	1. Robyn Spencer; 2. Neville McIntyre	71,598	2.45	−1.6
Liberals for Forests	1. Suresh Pathy; 2. John Lugg	70,134	2.40	+2.4
Democratic Labor	1. John Mulholland; 2. Pat Crea; 3. Gail King; 4. Rosemary Maurus; 5. Ken Wells	66,547	2.28	+0.0
Group C	1. Phil Cleary; 2. Eileen Zombolas	36,142	1.24	+1.24
Christian Democrats	1. Murray Graham; 2. Arnold Jago	17,155	0.59	+0.1
Unity	1. Wellington Lee; 2. Diana Wolowski; 3. Bill Cope (academic)	9,651	0.33	−0.4
Citizens Electoral Council	1. Noelene Isherwood; 2. Robert Barwick	2,660	0.09	+0.1
Group J	1. A.T. Baker; 2. Pam Barber	2,585	0.09	+0.09
Hope	1. Tim Petherbridge; 2. Lee-Anne Poynton	2,581	0.09	+0.1
Group Q	1. Alison Thorne; 2. Sarah Peart; 3. Tony Dewberry	1,730	0.06	+0.06
Group F	1. Steve Raskovy; 2. Elizabeth Kennedy	1,496	0.05	+0.05
Group E	1. Joseph Toscano; 2. Stephen Reghenzani	1,391	0.05	+0.05
Group N	1. Craig Davis; 2. Donna Brocas	700	0.02	+0.02
Independent	Daniel Flood	589	0.02	+0.02
Independent	Isaac Gnieslaw	559	0.02	+0.02
Independent	Richard Maslowski	105	0.01	+0.01
Total formal votes		2,918,267	94.40	−1.82
Informal votes		173,141	5.60	+1.82
Turnout		3,091,408	96.04	−0.55

=== Elections in the 1990s ===
==== 1998 ====
Elected	#	Senator	Party
1998
1998	1	Stephen Conroy	Labor
1998	2	Judith Troeth	Liberal
1998	3	Kim Carr	Labor
1998	4	Julian McGauran	National
1998	5	Jacinta Collins	Labor
1998	6	Tsebin Tchen	Liberal
1996
1996	1	Richard Alston	Liberal
1996	2	Robert Ray	Labor
1996	3	Rod Kemp	Liberal
1996	4	Barney Cooney	Labor
1996	5	Kay Patterson	Liberal
1996	6	Lyn Allison	Democrats

1998 Australian federal election: Senate, Victoria
Party	Candidate	Votes	%	±%
Quota		406,175		
Labor	1. Stephen Conroy (elected 1); 2. Kim Carr (elected 3); 3. Jacinta Collins (elected 5); 4. Wendy Boyle	1,153,161	40.6	+0.8
Coalition	1. Judith Troeth (Lib) (elected 2); 2. Julian McGauran (Nat) (elected 4); 3. Tsebin Tchen (Lib) (elected 6); 4. Karen Synon (Lib); 5. Dino de Marchi (Lib); 6. Anna Macgowan (Lib)	1,076,841	37.9	−3.5
Democrats	1. Jim Downey; 2. Matthew Townsend; 3. Ken Saunders; 4. Alison Harcourt	279,788	9.8	−1.1
One Nation	1. Robyn Spencer; 2. Ben Buckley	117,048	4.1	+4.1
Greens	1. Charmaine Clarke; 2. David Risstrom; 3. Liz Conor	70,872	2.5	−0.4
Shooters	1. Graham Eames; 2. Neville Sayers; 3. Alan Hutchison; 4. Graeme Forbes	34,434	1.2	+0.5
Democratic Labor	1. John Mulholland; 2. Pat Crea	29,894	1.1	−0.2
Unity	1. Bill Cope; 2. Phong Nguyen; 3. Wellington Lee; 4. Ricci Stewart; 5. Markham Rose; 6. Vivien Cerolini; 7. Naji Imam; 8. Mary Kalantzis	20,603	0.7	+0.7
Christian Democrats	1. Graham Murray; 2. Ken Cook	13,881	0.5	−0.1
Women's Party	1. Deb Nicholson; 2. Pat O'Brien	9,711	0.3	+0.3
Australian Bill of Rights	1. Eric Bullmore; 2. David Sydenham	9,314	0.3	+0.3
Australia First	1. Denis McCormack; 2. Colin Godfrey	6,081	0.2	+0.2
Reform	1. Ray Matheson; 2. Ted Drane	5,208	0.2	+0.2
Nuclear Disarmament	1. Gareth Smith; 2. Jacob Grech	3,196	0.1	+0.1
Abolish Child Support	1. Abboud Haidar; 2. John Abbotto	3,094	0.1	+0.1
Natural Law	1. Byron Rigby; 2. Raymond Schlager; 3. Lorna Scurfield	2,607	0.1	+0.1
Democratic Socialist	1. Jo Williams; 2. Vannessa Hearman	2,294	0.1	0.1
Group B	1. Joe Toscano; 2. Steve Roper	2,205	0.1	0.0
Socialist Equality	1. Sue Phillips; 2. Wil Marshall	1,392	0.0	0.0
Citizens Electoral Council	1. Craig Isherwood; 2. Robert Barwick	821	0.0	0.0
Independent	Cecil G. Murgatroyd	389	0.0	0.0
Independent	Malcolm McClure	168	0.0	0.0
Independent	Graham Smith	82	0.0	0.0
Independent	M H Pech	67	0.0	0.0
Independent	David Heffron	54	0.0	0.0
Total formal votes		2,843,218	96.2	−0.2
Informal votes		111,486	3.8	+0.2
Turnout		2,952,735	96.5	0.0

==== 1996 ====
Elected	#	Senator	Party
1996
1996	1	Richard Alston	Liberal
1996	2	Robert Ray	Labor
1996	3	Rod Kemp	Liberal
1996	4	Barney Cooney	Labor
1996	5	Kay Patterson	Liberal
1996	6	Lyn Allison	Democrats
1993
1993	1	Stephen Conroy	Labor
1993	2	Jim Short	Liberal
1993	3	Kim Carr	Labor
1993	4	Julian McGauran	National
1993	5	Jacinta Collins	Labor
1993	6	Judith Troeth	Liberal

1996 Australian federal election: Senate, Victoria
Party	Candidate	Votes	%	±%
Quota		395,356		
Coalition	1. Richard Alston (Lib) (elected 1); 2. Rod Kemp (Lib) (elected 3); 3. Kay Patterson (Lib) (elected 5); 4. Robert Ettery (Nat); 5. Robyne Head (Lib); 6. Anthony Fernandez (Lib)	1,146,655	41.4	−2.7
Labor	1. Robert Ray (elected 2); 2. Barney Cooney (elected 4); 3. Julia Gillard; 4. Melanie Raymond	1,100,799	39.8	−5.2
Democrats	1. Lyn Allison (elected 6); 2. John McLaren; 3. Laurie Levy; 4. Marj White	300,848	10.9	+6.9
Greens	1. Peter Singer; 2. Karen Alexander; 3. Helen Lucas	81,273	2.9	+1.7
AAFI	1. Dennis McCormack; 2. Robyn Spencer	40,607	1.4	+1.4
Democratic Labour	1. John Mulholland; 2. Paul Cahill; 3. Michael Rowe; 4. Pat Crea; 5. Matthew Cody; 6. Christine Dodd	36,156	1.3	−0.1
Shooters	1. Colin Wood; 2. Neville Sayers; 3. Gary Fliegner	19,573	0.7	+0.7
Call to Australia	1. Ken Cook; 2. Christine Chapman	16,497	0.6	−0.1
Pensioner and CIR	1. Will Borzatti; 2. Neil McKay	9,040	0.3	−0.5
Natural Law	1. Stephen Griffith; 2. Ngaire Mason	6,681	0.2	−0.2
Independent	David Armstrong	3,321	0.1	+0.1
Republican	1. Paul Dahan; 2. Des Bergen	2,249	0.1	−0.1
Group J	1. Joe Toscano; 2. Steve Roper	2,038	0.1	+0.1
Independent	Stephen Raskovy	619	0.0	0.0
Independent	Maurice Smith	150	0.0	0.0
Independent	Michael Good	110	0.0	0.0
Independent	John Abbotto	96	0.0	0.0
Independent	Neil Green	75	0.0	0.0
Total formal votes		2,767,485	96.4	−0.5
Informal votes		101,789	3.6	+0.5
Turnout		2,869,274	96.5	−0.1

==== 1993 ====
Elected	#	Senator	Party
1993	1	Gareth Evans	Labor
1993	2	Jim Short	Liberal
1993	3	Kim Carr	Labor
1993	4	Julian McGauran	National
1993	5	Olive Zakharov	Labor
1993	6	Judith Troeth	Liberal
1990	1	Richard Alston	Liberal
1990	2	Robert Ray	Labor
1990	3	Kay Patterson	Liberal
1990	4	Barney Cooney	Labor
1990	5	Rod Kemp	Liberal
1990	6	Sid Spindler	Democrats

1993 Australian federal election: Senate, Victoria
Party	Candidate	Votes	%	±%
Quota		392,370		
Labor	1. Gareth Evans (elected 1); 2. Kim Carr (elected 3); 3. Olive Zakharov (elected 5); 4. David McKenzie	1,235,344	45.0	+8.6
Coalition	1. Jim Short (Lib) (elected 2); 2. Julian McGauran (Nat) (elected 4); 3. Judith Troeth (Lib) (elected 6); 4. Tsebin Tchen (Lib); 5. Ian Curtis (Lib); 6. Bill Wall (Lib)	1,211,046	44.0	−0.5
Democrats	1. Robert Wood; 2. Maria Kayak; 3. Marj White; 4. John Pinniger; 5. Diane Casbolt; 6. Kathryn Stear	109,223	4.0	−10.1
Democratic Labor	1. John Mulholland; 2. Michael Rowe; 3. Pat Crea; 4. Christine Dodd; 5. Matthew Cody	38,317	1.4	+0.8
Group B	1. Janet Powell; 2. Michael Hamel-Green; 3. Anne O'Rourke; 4. Laurie Levy	33,710	1.2	+1.2
Greens	1. Francesca Davidson; 2. Loretta Asquini	32,472	1.2	+0.3
Pensioner and CIR	1. Neil McKay; 2. Alistair McKay	22,209	0.8	+0.8
Call to Australia	1. Ken Cook; 2. Murray Graham	20,105	0.7	+0.7
AAFI	1. Denis McCormack; 2. Robyn Spencer	18,926	0.7	+0.7
Natural Law	1. Steve Griffith; 2. Lorna Scurfield; 3. Ngaire Mason	12,347	0.4	+0.4
Republican	1. Brian Buckley; 2. Brendan Gidley	4,760	0.2	+0.2
Independent	Frank Hardy	3,523	0.1	+0.1
Independent	Toma Banjanin	2,216	0.1	+0.1
Independent	Tim Petherbridge	790	0.0	0.0
Independent	Abdul Fazal	565	0.0	0.0
Independent	Gordon Moffatt	365	0.0	0.0
Group K	1. Joe Toscano; 2. Stephen Roper	199	0.0	0.0
Independent	Michael Good	167	0.0	0.0
Independent	Steve Florin	90	0.0	0.0
Independent	Ivan Pavlekovich-Smith	64	0.0	0.0
Citizens Electoral Council	Noelene Isherwood	52	0.0	0.0
Independent	Laurie Bell	49	0.0	0.0
Citizens Electoral Council	Alex Rotaru	45	0.0	0.0
Total formal votes		2,746,584	96.9	+0.5
Informal votes		86,634	3.1	−0.5
Turnout		2,833,218	96.6	+0.4

==== 1990 ====
Elected	#	Senator	Party
1990
1990	1	Richard Alston	Liberal
1990	2	Robert Ray	Labor
1990	3	Kay Patterson	Liberal
1990	4	Barney Cooney	Labor
1990	5	Rod Kemp	Liberal
1990	6	Sid Spindler	Democrats
1987
1987	1	John Button	Labor
1987	2	Austin Lewis	Liberal
1987	3	Janet Powell	Democrats
1987	4	Gareth Evans	Labor
1987	5	Jim Short	Liberal
1987	6	Olive Zakharov	Labor

1990 Australian federal election: Senate, Victoria
Party	Candidate	Votes	%	±%
Quota		368,503		
Coalition	1. Richard Alston (Lib) (elected 1); 2. Kay Patterson (Lib) (elected 3); 3. Rod Kemp (Lib) (elected 5); 4. Julian McGauran (Nat); 5. Peter Coatman (Lib); 6. Severn Clarke (Lib)	1,149,170	44.5	+3.2
Labor	1. Robert Ray (elected 2); 2. Barney Cooney (elected 4); 3. Kim Carr; 4. Carole Marple; 5. Roger Lowrey	938,245	36.4	−7.6
Democrats	1. Sid Spindler (elected 6); 2. Jill O'Brien; 3. Hans Paas; 4. Christine Craik	365,376	14.2	+5.7
Call to Australia	1. Al Watson; 2. George Khoury	29,608	1.1	−0.1
Greens	1. Ken McGregor; 2. Alf Bamblett; 3. Pauline Scott	23,420	0.9	+0.9
AAFI	1. Denis McCormack; 2. Robyn Spencer	19,439	0.7	+0.7
Environment Inds	1. Gordon McQuilten; 2. Claire McLeod	16,655	0.6	+0.6
Pensioner	1. Neil McKay; 2. Fred Grant	15,447	0.6	−0.1
Democratic Labour	1. Robert Semmel; 2. Jean Taylor	14,744	0.6	−1.5
Group F	1. Peter Robinson; 2. John Giltinan	3,903	0.1	+0.1
Independent	Athol Guy	2,023	0.1	+0.1
Independent	Chris Vassis	728	0.0	0.0
Independent	Mabel Cardinal	227	0.0	0.0
Independent	Joe Toscano	215	0.0	0.0
Independent	Deborah Goudappel	119	0.0	0.0
Independent	Edward Fraser	89	0.0	0.0
Independent	Don Meggs	82	0.0	0.0
Independent	James Bernard	30	0.0	0.0
Total formal votes		2,579,520	96.4	+0.4
Informal votes		96,171	3.6	−0.4
Turnout		2,675,691	96.2	+0.9

=== Elections in the 1980s ===
==== 1987 ====
1987 Australian federal election: Senate, Victoria
Party	Candidate	Votes	%	±%
Quota		189,970		
Labor	1. John Button (elected 1); 2. Gareth Evans (elected 4); 3. Olive Zakharov (elected 6); 4. Robert Ray (elected 8); 5. Barney Cooney (elected 10); 6. John Halfpenny; 7. Carole Taylor	1,086,513	44.0	−0.1
Liberal	1. Austin Lewis (elected 2); 2. Jim Short (elected 5); 3. Richard Alston (elected 7); 4. David Hamer (elected 9); 5. Kay Patterson (elected 12); 6. John Wyld; 7. John Goodfellow; 8. John Riggall; 9. Severn Clarke	878,899	35.6	+1.4
Democrats	1. Janet Powell (elected 3); 2. Sid Spindler; 3. Ken Peak; 4. Harold Fraser; 5. Peter Allen	211,043	8.5	+1.6
National	1. Julian McGauran (elected 11); 2. Noel Maughan; 3. Les Flintoff	140,143	5.7	+1.7
Democratic Labor	1. John Mulholland; 2. Gloria Brook	50,894	2.0	+0.6
Call to Australia	1. Al Watson; 2. Loretto Brennan; 3. John Easton	28,966	1.2	−0.1
Nuclear Disarmament	1. Aldo Penbrook; 2. Nik Dow	28,352	1.1	−6.2
Pensioner	1. Neil McKay; 2. Rosamond Ewan	17,265	0.7	−0.1
Unite Australia	1. John Siddons; 2. Ian Price; 3. Lisa Harris	11,213	0.5	+0.5
Group B	1. Bill Hartley; 2. Laurene Dietrich; 3. David Kerin; 4. Rola Haidar	4,243	0.2	+0.2
Group L	1. Laurie Dunlop; 2. Simon Hood	4,113	0.2	+0.2
Group F	1. David Caccianiga; 2. Bill Thiele	2,145	0.1	+0.1
Group O	1. Dino de Marchi; 2. Ineke Black	2,086	0.1	+0.1
Group J	1. Lisa King; 2. Kevin O'Connell	1,729	0.1	+0.1
Group K	1. Alan Miller; 2. Maria Bennett	1,320	0.1	+0.1
Independent	Kym Roylance	510	0.0	0.0
Independent	Abraham Abdalla	172	0.0	0.0
Total formal votes		2,469,606	96.0	+0.2
Informal votes		102,382	4.0	−0.2
Turnout		2,571,988	95.3	−0.1

#	Senator	Party
1	John Button	Labor
2	Austin Lewis	Liberal
3	Janet Powell	Democrat
4	Gareth Evans	Labor
5	Jim Short	Liberal
6	Olive Zakharov	Labor
7	Richard Alston	Liberal
8	Robert Ray	Labor
9	David Hamer	Liberal
10	Barney Cooney	Labor
11	Julian McGauran	National
12	Kay Patterson	Liberal

==== 1984 ====
Elected	#	Senator	Party
1985
1985	1	Olive Zakharov	Labor
1985	2	Alan Missen	Liberal
1985	3	Robert Ray	Labor
1985	4	David Hamer	Liberal
1985	5	Barney Cooney	Labor
1985	6	Jim Short	Liberal
1985	7	John Siddons	Democrats
1982
1982	1	John Button	Labor
1982	2	Margaret Guilfoyle	Liberal
1982	3	Gareth Evans	Labor
1982	4	Austin Lewis	Liberal
1982	5	Don Chipp	Democrats

1984 Australian federal election: Senate, Victoria
Party	Candidate	Votes	%	±%
Quota		298,787		
Labor	1. Olive Zakharov (elected 1); 2. Robert Ray (elected 3); 3. Barney Cooney (elected 5); 4. Carole Marple	1,053,488	44.0	−2.4
Liberal	1. Alan Missen (elected 2); 2. David Hamer (elected 4); 3. Jim Short (elected 6); 4. Richard Alston; 5. Zirka Yaskewych	816,362	34.2	+34.2
Nuclear Disarmament	1. Jean Melzer; 2. Venturino Venturini	174,389	7.3	+7.3
Democrats	1. John Siddons (elected 7); 2. Janet Powell; 3. Ian Price; 4. Sid Spindler; 5. Kenneth Peak	165,624	6.9	−5.1
National	1. Shirley McKerrow; 2. John Cromarty; 3. Louise Jenkins; 4. John Keating; 5. Murray Buzza	95,954	4.0	+4.0
Democratic Labour	1. Brian Handley; 2. Maria Handley; 3. William Mahony; 4. Lois Mahony	32,472	1.3	−0.9
Call to Australia	1. Barry Tattersall; 2. Valerie Renkema; 3. Edna Hall; 4. John Easton	30,797	1.3	+1.3
Pensioner	1. Neil McKay; 2. Margaret Carter	19,922	0.8	+0.8
Independent	Maurice Smith	615	0.0	0.0
Independent	Tiger Casley	249	0.0	0.0
Independent	Bill Kapphan	168	0.0	0.0
Independent	Michael Krape	155	0.0	0.0
Independent	Augustus Titter	93	0.0	0.0
Total formal votes		2,390,288	95.8	+6.5
Informal votes		104,906	4.2	−6.5
Turnout		2,495,194	95.4	−0.5

- The Liberals and Nationals contested the previous election as a Coalition in the previous election, and did not do so in this election. The Coalition vote of 1983 of 38.2% was unchanged from the combined Liberal and National vote of this election.

==== 1983 ====
1983 Australian federal election: Senate, Victoria
Party	Candidate	Votes	%	±%
Quota		194,358		
Labor	1. John Button (elected 1); 2. Gareth Evans (elected 4); 3. Cyril Primmer (elected 6); 4. Robert Ray (elected 8); 5. Olive Zakharov (elected 10); 6. Geoffrey Fary	994,471	46.5	+3.5
Coalition	1. Margaret Guilfoyle (Lib) (elected 2); 2. Austin Lewis (Lib) (elected 5); 3. Alan Missen (Lib) (elected 7); 4. David Hamer (Lib) (elected 9); 5. Shirley McKerrow (Nat); 6. Murray Buzza (Nat)	816,116	38.2	−2.6
Democrats	1. Don Chipp (elected 3); 2. John Siddons; 3. Janet Powell; 4. Ian Price	256,402	12.0	+0.7
Democratic Labour	1. Brian Handley; 2. Edna Hall; 3. John Easton; 4. James Jordan	47,206	2.2	+0.6
Independent	Jim Cairns	11,226	0.5	+0.5
Integrity Team	1. Robert J. Steer; 2. Louis Cook; 3. Robert B. Steer; 4. Beverley Meacher; 5. Miliano Mele	3,753	0.2	+0.2
Pensioner	1. Neil McKay; 2. Joseph Radcliffe; 3. George Cole	2,755	0.1	+0.1
Advance Victoria	1. Thomas Kelly; 2. Ellen Kelly; 3. Stephen Kelly; 4. Nicholas Kelly	1,346	0.1	+0.1
Socialist	1. Trevor McCandless; 2. Mark Treloar	1,142	0.1	+0.1
Socialist Workers	1. Maree Walk; 2. Andrew Jamieson	877	0.0	0.0
Proud to be Australian	1. Athol Kelly; 2. Graham Todd	625	0.0	0.0
Independent	Patrick Flanagan	493	0.0	0.0
Social Democrats	1. Joseph Johnson; 2. Brian Coe	366	0.0	0.0
Progress	1. Ian Mackechnie; 2. David Miller	290	0.0	0.0
Independent	Andrew Kaspariunas	229	0.0	0.0
Ethnic	Nikolaus Millios	205	0.0	0.0
Independent	Louis Constant	132	0.0	0.0
Independent	Earl Mignon	108	0.0	0.0
Independent	Umberto Mammarella	103	0.0	0.0
Independent	Leonard Stubbs	89	0.0	0.0
Total formal votes		2,137,934	89.3	−1.6
Informal votes		255,797	10.7	+1.6
Turnout		2,393,731	95.9	+0.9

#	Senator	Party
1	John Button	Labor
2	Margaret Guilfoyle	Liberal
3	Don Chipp	Democrat
4	Gareth Evans	Labor
5	Austin Lewis	Liberal
6	Cyril Primmer	Labor
7	Alan Missen	Liberal
8	Robert Ray	Labor
9	David Hamer	Liberal
10	Olive Zakharov	Labor

==== 1980 ====
Elected	#	Senator	Party
1981
1981	1	Cyril Primmer	Labor
1981	2	Margaret Guilfoyle	Liberal
1981	3	Robert Ray	Labor
1981	4	Austin Lewis	Liberal
1981	5	John Siddons	Democrat
1978
1978	1	Alan Missen	Liberal
1978	2	Gareth Evans	Labor
1978	3	David Hamer	Liberal
1978	4	John Button	Labor
1978	5	Don Chipp	Democrat

1980 Australian federal election: Senate, Victoria
Party	Candidate	Votes	%	±%
Quota		339,953		
Labor	1. Cyril Primmer (elected 1); 2. Robert Ray (elected 3); 3. Jean Melzer	877,468	43.0	+8.8
Coalition	1. Margaret Guilfoyle (Lib) (elected 2); 2. Austin Lewis (Lib) (elected 4); 3. Laurence Neal (NCP)	831,703	40.8	−1.0
Democrats	1. John Siddons (elected 5); 2. Janet Powell; 3. Ian Price	231,113	11.3	−4.9
Democratic Labour	1. Paul McManus; 2. John Flint; 3. Robert Semmel	31,766	1.6	−4.6
Australia	1. Gail Farrell; 2. Frederick Funnell	25,734	1.3	+1.2
Marijuana	1. Margaret Fraser; 2. James Billington	11,684	0.6	−0.1
Group B	1. John Jess; 2. John Davies; 3. Donald Moyes	10,402	0.5	+0.5
Group K	1. Francis Petering; 2. Jean McPherson; 3. Louis Cook	9,081	0.4	+0.4
Socialist	1. Georgina Lialios; 2. Trevor McCandless; 3. Raymond Berbling	2,791	0.1	−0.1
Group E	1. Shane Watson; 2. Ernest Langmaid	1,765	0.1	+0.1
Group D	1. George Samargis; 2. Daniel Smargis	1,538	0.1	+0.1
Independent	Pamela Moore	1,498	0.1	+0.1
Independent	Anthony Palmer	1,470	0.1	+0.1
Independent	Augustus Titter	1,157	0.1	+0.1
Independent	Maurice Smith	329	0.0	0.0
Independent	Wilhelm Kapphan	217	0.0	0.0
Total formal votes		2,039,716	90.9	0.0
Informal votes		256,060	9.1	0.0
Turnout		2,295,776	95.0	−0.7

=== Elections in the 1960s ===
==== 1966 ====
1966 Australian federal election: Senate special, Victoria
Party	Candidate	Votes	%	±%
Quota		593,218		
Country	1. James Webster (re-elected 1); 2. Lloyd Atkin	761,449	50.26	
Labor	1. George Poyser (re-elected 2); 2. Giuseppe Di Salvo	507,188	33.48	
Democratic Labor	1. Jack Little; 2. Frank Dowling	190,681	12.59	
Liberal Reform Group	1. Edwin Ryan	43,716	2.89	
Independent	1. Kenneth Nolan; 2. Laurence Hoult	11,933	0.79	
Total formal votes		4,152,524	95.83	
Informal votes		180,743	4.17	
Turnout		4,333,267	93.98	

=== Elections in the 1910s ===
==== 1914 ====
Each elector voted for up to six candidates. Percentages refer to the number of voters rather than the number of votes.

1914 Australian federal election: Senate, Victoria
Party	Candidate	Votes	%	±%
Labor	John Barnes (re-elected 1)	334,782	53.7	+4.5 (Note: Change compared to the personal vote at the 1913 election.)
Labor	Stephen Barker (re-elected 2)	334,517	53.6	+5.2 (Note: Change compared to the personal vote at the 1910 election.)
Labor	Edward Russell (re-elected 3)	334,238	53.6	+3.5
Labor	Andrew McKissock (elected 4)	333,739	53.5	+4.5
Labor	Albert Blakey (re-elected 5)	331,911	53.2	+5.1
Labor	Edward Findley (re-elected 6)	329,198	52.8	+4.1
Liberal	James McColl (defeated)	294,104	47.2	−2.5
Liberal	Samuel Mauger	293,353	47.0	−1.8
Liberal	William Edgar	289,854	46.5	
Liberal	James Hume Cook	289,478	46.4	
Liberal	William Trenwith	289,196	46.4	
Liberal	William McLean	287,542	46.1	
Total formal votes		3,741,912; 623,652 voters	96.71	+1.6
Informal votes		21,246	3.29	−1.2
Turnout		644,898	79.15	+3.66
Party total votes
Labor		1,998,385	53.41	+3.98
Liberal		1,743,527	46.59	−2.56

==== 1913 ====
Each elector voted for up to three candidates. Percentages refer to the number of voters rather than the number of votes.

1913 Australian federal election: Senate, Victoria
Party	Candidate	Votes	%	±%
Labour	Edward Russell (re-elected 1)	299,969	50.1	+13.3 (Note: Change compared to the personal vote at the 1906 election.)
Liberal	James McColl (re-elected 2)	297,390	49.7	−2.3
Labour	John Barnes (elected 3)	294,919	49.2	
Liberal	Carty Salmon	293,370	49.0	
Labour	Andrew McKissock	293,307	49.0	
Liberal	Samuel Mauger	292,412	48.8	
Independent	William Renwick	25,528	4.3	
Total formal votes		1,796,895; 598,965 voters	95.5	+1.0
Informal votes		27,896	4.5	−0.1
Turnout		626,861	75.5	+8.9
Party total votes
Labour		888,195	49.4	+1.0
Liberal		883,172	49.1	+2.8
Independent		25,528	1.4	

==== 1910 ====
Each elector voted for up to three candidates. Percentages refer to the number of voters rather than the number of votes.

1910 Australian federal election: Senate, Victoria
Party	Candidate	Votes	%	±%
Labour	Edward Findley (re-elected 1)	217,573	48.7	+19.8 (Note: Change compared to the personal vote at the 1903 election.)
Labour	Stephen Barker (elected 2)	216,199	48.4	+23.7
Labour	Albert Blakey (elected 3)	215,117	48.1	
Liberal	Robert Best (defeated)	213,976	47.9	+16.0
Liberal	William Trenwith (defeated)	211,058	47.2	+13.8
Liberal	James McCay	195,477	43.7	
Independent	Vida Goldstein	53,538,511	12.0	
Independent	James Ronald	18,380	4.1	
Total formal votes		1,341,363; 447,121 voters	95.4	+1.6
Informal votes		21,414	4.6	−1.6
Turnout		468,535	66.6	+9.9
Party total votes
Labour		648,889	48.4	+15.7
Liberal		620,511	46.3	−20.9 (Note: Change compared to the combined Anti-Socialist and Protectionist vote at the 1906 election.)
Independent		71,963	5.4	

=== Elections in the 1900s ===
==== 1906 ====
Each elector voted for up to three candidates. Percentages refer to the number of voters rather than the number of votes.

1906 Australian federal election: Senate, Victoria
Party	Candidate	Votes	%	±%
Anti-Socialist	Sir Simon Fraser (re-elected 1)	188,299	52.6	
Anti-Socialist	James McColl (elected 2)	185,906	52.0	
Labour	Edward Russell (elected 3)	131,500	36.8	
Labour	Tom Tunnecliffe	131,071	36.6	
Protectionist	James Styles (defeated)	116,599	32.6	
Anti-Socialist	Thomas Skene	105,929	29.6	
Labour	Stephen Barker	88,511	24.7	
Protectionist	Alexander Ramsay	87,385	24.4	
Protectionist	Charles Atkins	37,912	10.6	
Total formal votes		1,073,112; 357,704 voters	93.8	−4.0
Informal votes		23,481	6.2	+4.0
Turnout		381,185	56.7	+5.5
Party total votes
Anti-Socialist		480,134	44.7	
Labour		351,082	32.7	
Protectionist		241,896	22.5	

==== 1903 ====
There were four vacancies in Victoria due to the death of Sir Frederick Sargood. Robert Reid (Free Trade) had filled the seat in the interim, with the fourth senator elected serving the balance of Sargood's term ending on 31 December 1906. Each elector voted for up to four candidates. Percentages refer to the number of voters rather than the number of votes.

1903 Australian federal election: Senate, Victoria
Party	Candidate	Votes	%	±%
Independent Labour	William Trenwith (Note: William Trenwith, was a former trade union official and leader of the Victorian Labour Party who was an independent because of his refusal to pledge to vote as directed by the Labour Party.) (elected 1)	102,382	33.4	
Protectionist	Robert Best (re-elected 2)	97,693	31.9	
Labour	Edward Findley (elected 3)	88,614	28.9	
Protectionist	James Styles (re-elected 4)	85,287	27.8	
Free Trade	Sir John McIntyre	84,699	27.6	
Free Trade	Frederick Derham	81,912	26.7	
Labour	Robert Solly	80,593	26.3	
Labour	Stephen Barker	76,039	24.8	
Free Trade	John Templeton	74,062	24.2	
Labour	John Lemmon	73,245	23.9	
Free Trade	Edmund Smith	71,875	23.5	
Protectionist	John Dow	68,123	22.2	
Protectionist	John Barrett (defeated)	64,346	21.0	
Ind. Protectionist	William McCulloch	58,284	19.0	
Ind. Protectionist	Vida Goldstein	51,497	16.8	
Ind. Protectionist	Sir Bryan O'Loghlen	27,160	8.9	
Ind. Protectionist	George Wise	21,056	6.9	
Ind. Free Trade	Henry Williams	19,061	6.2	
Total formal votes		1,225,928; 306,482 voters	97.8	
Informal votes		7,003	2.2	
Turnout		313,485	51.2	
Party total votes
Labour		318,491	26.0	
Protectionist		315,449	25.7	
Free Trade		312,548	25.5	
Ind. Protectionist		157,997	12.9	
Independent Labour		102,382	8.4	
Ind. Free Trade		19,061	1.6	

==== 1901 ====
Each elector voted for up to six candidates; as such percentages are shown of the total number of voters rather than the total number of votes.

Although Fraser and Zeal were not selected Protectionist candidates, they sat as formal Protectionists in parliament.

1901 Australian federal election: Senate, Victoria
Party	Candidate	Votes	%	±%
Ind. Protectionist	Simon Fraser (elected 1)	85,820	61.2	+61.2
Ind. Protectionist	Sir William Zeal (elected 2)	83,243	59.4	+59.4
Free Trade	Sir Frederick Sargood (elected 3)	79,956	57.0	+57.0
Protectionist	James Styles (elected 5)	62,557	44.6	+44.6
Protectionist	Robert Best (elected 4)	63,075	45.0	+45.0
Labour	John Barrett (elected 6)	59,366	42.3	+42.3
Protectionist	John Dow	55,879	39.8	+39.8
Free Trade	Robert Reid	52,851	37.7	+37.7
Ind. Protectionist	George Wise	47,874	34.1	+34.1
Free Trade	John Wallace	47,603	33.9	+33.9
Protectionist	William Watt	33,776	24.1	+24.1
Free Trade	John Duffy	33,423	23.8	+23.8
Free Trade	William Moule	28,772	20.5	+20.5
Labour	Stephen Barker	27,059	19.3	+19.3
Labour	Alfred Hampson	21,419	15.3	+15.3
Free Trade	James Purves	18,977	13.5	+13.5
Ind. Protectionist	Richard Baker	17,564	12.5	+12.5
Protectionist	William Kelly	12,803	9.1	+9.1
Ind. Protectionist	Charles Sargeant	9,442	6.7	+6.7
Total formal votes		841,459		
Total formal ballots		140,243		
Informal ballots		unknown		
Turnout		unknown		
Party total votes
Free Trade		261,582	31.1	+31.1
Ind. Protectionist		243,943	29.0	+29.0
Protectionist		228,090	27.1	+27.1
Labour		107,844	12.8	+12.8

== See also ==
- List of senators from Victoria
