= Sold =

Sold may refer to:

- Sold (Boy George album), 1987
- Sold (Died Pretty album), 1996
- Sold (TV series), a British comedy drama television series
- Sold (McCormick novel), a 2006 novel by Patricia McCormick and Illustrated by Bryn Barnard
- Sold (Gullifer novel), a 2009 novel by Brendan Gullifer
- Sold (1915 film), an American silent film directed by Edwin S. Porter
- Sold (2014 film), a narrative feature film directed by Jeffrey D. Brown
- Sold (2022 film), Indian film
- "Sold (The Grundy County Auction Incident)", a 1995 song by John Michael Montgomery
- "Sold" (Band of Gold), a 1995 television episode
- "Sold!", an episode of season 9 of SpongeBob SquarePants

== See also ==
- Sell (disambiguation)
