= Olive Zakharov =

Australian politician

Senator for Victoria
- In office 5 March 1983 – 6 March 1995
- Succeeded by: Jacinta Collins

Personal details
- Born: Alice Olive Hay; 19 March 1929 Kew, Victoria
- Died: 6 March 1995 (aged 65) Melbourne, Victoria
- Party: Australian Labor Party
- Education: University of Melbourne
- Occupation: Psychiatric nurse

Alice Olive Zakharov (née Hay; 19 March 1929 – 6 March 1995) was an Australian politician. Zakharov was elected as an Australian Labor Party member of the Australian Senate in 1983.

Former Senator Graham Richardson, a leader of the party's right faction, once stated that Zakharov "works hard on social issues in the chamber, but hides her light under a bushel far too successfully". She was re-elected in 1984, 1987, and 1993, and was in the midst of her final term in the Senate when she was killed in an automobile accident in early 1995.

== Before politics ==
Zakharov was born Alice Olive Hay, in Kew, Melbourne. She studied psychology as part of an arts degree at Melbourne University, where she joined the local branch of the Communist Party of Australia, something which she later discovered had brought her to the attention of the Australian Security Intelligence Organisation. She briefly married while at university, but the couple separated in 1949, and she soon moved to Yallourn to live with a new partner, unionist John Zakharov, who she later married and began a family with. As a young woman, she juggled her family commitments with a number of jobs, working as a market research interviewer, clerk, waitress, mail officer, psychiatric nurse, and pathology assistant. She also continued to be politically active, being involved in the local branch of the Australian Labor Party.

In 1968, after the last of her children had reached primary school, Zakharov separated from her husband, and later divorced him, though she retained his surname. She proceeded to raise her children alone, and in 1969 began as a student welfare co-ordinator at Montmorency High School in Melbourne. She served as president of her local party branch, and was a delegate to the party's state conference. She was offered a safe Labor seat in the Parliament of Victoria in the 1970s, but declined for family reasons.

== Senate career ==
Zakharov subsequently sought preselection to run as a Labor Senate candidate in Victoria at the double dissolution 1983 federal election. She received the fifth position on the Labor ticket, and easily swept into parliament in the landslide Labor victory. She soon established herself as a loyal member of the Socialist Left faction and as an advocate for equal rights for women and the rights of the disadvantaged. This early advocacy for progressive causes brought her the second ever Australian Humanist of the Year award in 1984. Due to having won the tenth spot in 1983, Zakharov was forced to face election against the following year, but was once again comfortably returned. Once asked why she had begun a political career so late in life, Zakharov compared herself to marathon runner Cliff Young and stated, "[l]ate runs can be very successful."

Throughout the 1980s, Zakharov remained a loyal member of the party, but made her voice heard on a number of issues. She was the lone voice of dissent when the other five members of the Senate Select Committee on Video Material urged the banning of X-rated videos in 1984. Two years later, Zakharov and Senator Rosemary Crowley opposed legislation against scientific experimentation on human embryos that had been proposed by conservative independent Brian Harradine. The remainder of the select committee set up to evaluate the proposal supported a compromise majority report that severely limited scientific experimentation; in a high-profile dissenting report, Zakharov and Crowley urged that the parents of the embryos have the final say as to how they were used, and were highly critical of the absolute pro-life arguments employed by the majority. While the report was overlooked by the government at the time, it was later largely adopted by the New South Wales Law Reform Commission. Zakharov also remained involved in her local community; she used her political connections to help save her historic neighbourhood in Port Melbourne from demolition, and at one point painted "NOT FOR SALE" on her roof in order to promote the message.

In 1988, Zakharov was the only 1st world politician invited to witness the first destruction of nuclear weapons at a ceremony in the Soviet Union after the signing of a disarmament agreement. Upon returning from the USSR, she described the occasion as "the chance of a thousand lifetimes". Four years later, she joined a crossbench group (along with Labor's Chris Schacht, Bruce Childs and Margaret Reynolds and the Liberal Party's Baden Teague) to become involved in the international campaign to free jailed Israeli scientist Mordechai Vanunu.

While Zakharov did speak out on several key issues, she remained bound by the principles of party discipline. In 1988, she was critical of the proposals that became the Higher Education Contribution Scheme while they were in caucus, although she promptly dropped the matter when the majority supported the changes. This again occurred with planned price increases to various Medicare services in 1992, when Zakharov used her position as chair of the Senate Standing Committee on Community Affairs to cut committee hearings short, to the chagrin of the opposition parties. She did, however, manage to win some small concessions through the committee's final report, and somewhat embarrassed Deputy Prime Minister Brian Howe in the process.

One of the strangest moments in Zakharov's career occurred in late 1990, when, as a member of the parliamentary Australian Security Intelligence Organisation (ASIO) committee, she was given access to her own intelligence file. She was not surprised to discover that ASIO had shown interest in her membership of the Communist Party while at university; what she was not prepared for was a detailed investigation the organisation had made in 1963, after becoming concerned that John Zakharov was a bigamist. A less-than-impressed Zakharov speculated at the time that the contents of her file may have cost her at least one public service position during the 1970s.

In June 1992, the Labor Party proposed legalising the entry of gay and lesbian people into the armed forces. Zakharov had always been a strong supporter of gay rights, and successfully nominated for the investigating committee. The proposed changes were strongly opposed by then-Defence Minister Robert Ray and later Opposition Leader Kim Beazley. Zakharov helped push the proposals through caucus, to see them become law not long afterwards. She also publicly opposed discrimination against gay parents.

In the leadup to the 1993 federal election, there was some speculation that Zakharov would be dropped from the Labor ticket due to her mild manner and low media profile. She lost the second position on the ticket to factional powerbroker Kim Carr, but secured the third position against several challengers, including former lower house MP David McKenzie. Labor was not expected to do well at the election, and it was thought that Zakharov was likely to lose, just as Carr had done from the same position at the 1990 election. However, she retained her seat, fending off challenges from Democrat-turned-independent Janet Powell and Nuclear Disarmament Party-turned-Democrat Robert Wood in the general election.

In November 1993, Zakharov publicly revealed that she had been a victim of domestic violence at the hands of her deceased husband for ten years prior to their separation. She launched the government's Campaign to Stop Violence Against Women, and urged other victims and their neighbours to speak up. She said at the time that she had kept silent because "There were no alternatives. There were no refuges for women, no supporting parent's benefit and almost no child care. I made the break when my youngest was old enough to go to school so I could work."

== Death ==
Zakharov was struck by a car on the afternoon of 12 February 1995, while crossing St Kilda Road after leaving the Midsumma Festival. She was in a coma for three weeks, but did not regain consciousness and, having never regained consciousness, Zakharov died on 6 March. No charges were laid regarding the accident. She was the first woman Senator to die in office.

Upon her death, the Senate adjourned early and several red roses, the symbol of the international socialist movement, were placed upon her desk as a mark of respect. More than two hours of condolence speeches were delivered in parliament, and after her funeral on 30 March, a memorial plaque was unveiled in the courtyard at Parliament House. Deputy Prime Minister Brian Howe attempted to convince the state Kennett government to save the historic Missions to Seamen building in Port Melbourne, which Zakharov had been fighting to save, as a memorial to her, but was unsuccessful.

A memorial to her in a park in Bay Street, Port Melbourne was unveiled in March 2002.
