= Jacinta Collins =

Australian politician (born 1962)

The Honourable Jacinta Collins
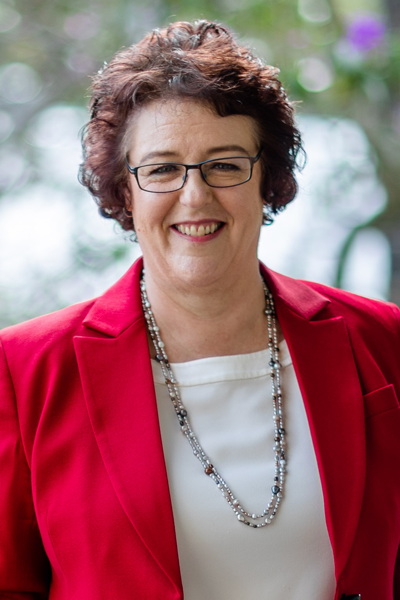
- Collins in March 2019

Senator for Victoria
- In office 8 May 2008 – 15 February 2019
- Preceded by: Robert Ray
- Succeeded by: Raff Ciccone
- In office 3 May 1995 – 30 June 2005
- Preceded by: Olive Zakharov

Minister for Mental Health and Ageing
- In office 1 July 2013 – 18 September 2013
- Prime Minister: Kevin Rudd
- Preceded by: Mark Butler
- Succeeded by: Kevin Andrews

Manager of Government Business in the Senate
- In office 5 March 2012 – 18 September 2013
- Prime Minister: Kevin Rudd
- Preceded by: Joe Ludwig
- Succeeded by: Mitch Fifield

Personal details
- Born: Jacinta Mary Ann Collins; 4 September 1962 (age 64) Altona, Victoria, Australia
- Party: Australian Labor Party
- Education: Monash University; La Trobe University
- Occupation: Research officer

Jacinta Mary Ann Collins (born 4 September 1962) is a former Australian politician who served as a Senator for Victoria from 1995 to 2005 and again from 2008 to 2019. She represented the Australian Labor Party (ALP) and was the party's deputy leader in the Senate from June to October 2013. Collins was a parliamentary secretary in the Gillard government and Minister for Mental Health and Ageing in the second Rudd government. She retired from politics prior to the 2019 federal election and accepted an appointment as national executive director of the National Catholic Education Commission on 18 February 2019.

== Early life ==
Collins was born on 4 September 1962 in Altona, Victoria. She grew up in the suburb of Ashwood in Melbourne. She holds the degrees of Bachelor of Arts from Monash University and Bachelor of Social Work from La Trobe University.

Collins worked for the Shop, Distributive and Allied Employees' Association (SDA) from 1980 until her appointment to the Senate in 1995, initially as a social welfare and research officer and then as national industrial officer for five years. She was a delegate to the Australian Council of Trade Unions (ACTU) national congress from 1983 and was elected to the ACTU council in 1993.

== Political career ==
Collins first entered parliament as a Senator for Victoria in 1995. She was appointed to the Senate to fill a casual vacancy caused by the death of Olive Zakharov. At the time, Collins was the only Victorian female Labor representative.

From October 1998 to November 2001, Collins was Parliamentary Secretary to the Shadow Minister for Industrial Relations and Employment, Training and Population. In 2003, she was named Shadow Minister for Children and Youth.

At the 2004 election, she lost her Senate seat to Steve Fielding of the Family First Party. In 2006 she was preselected for the number one spot on the Labor ticket in Victoria for the 2007 federal election, replacing Senator Robert Ray, who did not contest the election.

Collins was elected, and her term was due to start on 1 July 2008 when Ray's term expired. However, he resigned on 5 May 2008 and she was appointed to the casual vacancy. She was sworn into the Senate later that month.

Collins was promoted to the Second Gillard Ministry as the Parliamentary Secretary for School Education and Workplace Relations on 14 September 2010. In March 2012, she became the first woman to be appointed Manager of Government Business in the Senate following the retirement of Senator Mark Arbib.

On 26 June 2013, following the return of Rudd as leader, Collins was elected Deputy Leader of the Government in the Senate by her parliamentary colleagues. She replaced Senator Penny Wong, who was elevated to Senate leader. This was the first all-female Senate Government leadership team.

Collins was active on many Senate committees, including:

- Chair of the Employment, Workplace Relations, Small Business and Education References Committee
- Chair of the Economics References Committee
- Chair of the Privileges Committee

=== Views ===
Collins was known for her social conservatism, including opposition to assisted reproductive technology for lesbians and single women, opposition to the use of human embryos in medical research, and opposition to same-sex marriage.

== Post-politics ==
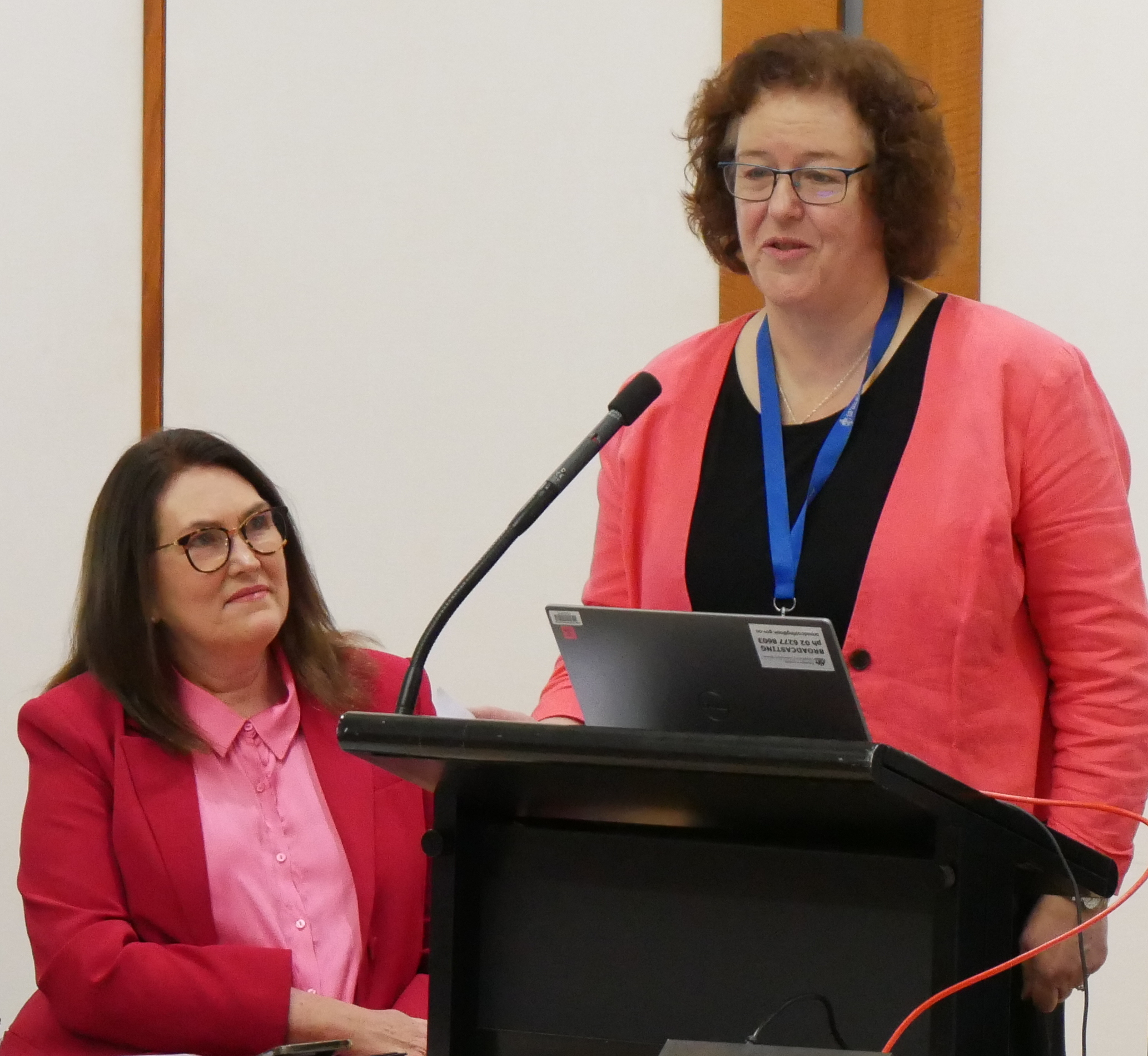
Collins addressing the Parliamentary Friends of Religious Schools and Faith Communities in 2023, alongside Senator Deborah O'Neill

In January 2019, Collins announced that she would not contest the next election, citing "family health issues" for her decision to quit politics. She resigned from the Senate on 15 February 2019, and was announced as the new head of the National Catholic Education Commission on the same day. She commenced her role on 18 February 2019.

In 2023, Jacinta was awarded an Honorary Doctorate of Letters from the University of Notre Dame Australia for her contribution to public life and education.

== Personal life ==
Collins has two children with her husband Daryl, a train driver. She was one of the first female MPs allowed to carry an infant on the floor of parliament.

Collins' first child was born from an unplanned pregnancy when she was 19 years old. The child was placed for adoption.
