= John Madigan (politician) =

Australian politician (1966–2020)

Senator for Victoria
- In office 1 July 2011 – 2 July 2016
- Preceded by: Steve Fielding
- Succeeded by: Jane Hume

Leader of John Madigan's Manufacturing and Farming Party
- In office 8 April 2015 – 13 September 2016
- Preceded by: Party established
- Succeeded by: Party dissolved

Leader of the Democratic Labour Party in the Senate
- In office 1 July 2011 – 4 September 2014
- Leader: David McCabe; Paul Funnell
- Preceded by: Office established
- Succeeded by: Office abolished

Leader of the Democratic Labour Party in Victoria
- In office 21 August 2010 – 4 September 2014
- Deputy: Rachel Carling-Jenkins
- Preceded by: Peter Kavanagh
- Succeeded by: Rachel Carling-Jenkins

Deputy Leader of the Democratic Labour Party in Victoria
- In office 2008–2009
- Leader: Peter Kavanagh
- Preceded by: Maugerita Kavanagh
- Succeeded by: Rachel Carling-Jenkins

Personal details
- Born: John Joseph Madigan; 21 July 1966 Melbourne, Victoria, Australia
- Died: 16 June 2020 (aged 53) Ballarat Victoria, Australia
- Party: Democratic Labour (until 2014; 2020)
- Other political affiliations: Independent (2014–15); Manufacturing and Farming (2015–16)
- Spouse: Teresa Madigan
- Children: 2
- Occupation: Blacksmith; Politician

John Joseph Madigan (21 July 1966 – 16 June 2020) was an Australian blacksmith and politician. He served as a Senator for Victoria from 2011 to 2016. He was elected to the Senate at the 2010 federal election as a member of the Democratic Labour Party (DLP). He resigned from the DLP to become an independent in September 2014, and later launched "John Madigan's Manufacturing and Farming Party" in 2015.

He failed to be re-elected at the 2016 double dissolution election.

== Early life ==
Born into a Catholic family, Madigan belonged to a youth group run by the National Civic Council founder, B. A. Santamaria, in Melbourne. Madigan was a blacksmith and boilermaker from 1983 to 2011, self-employed in his own engineering workshop in Hepburn Springs, Victoria. He has an apprenticeship in Structural Steel Fabrication from Newport TAFE. He lived in Ballarat and was married with two children.

== Politics ==
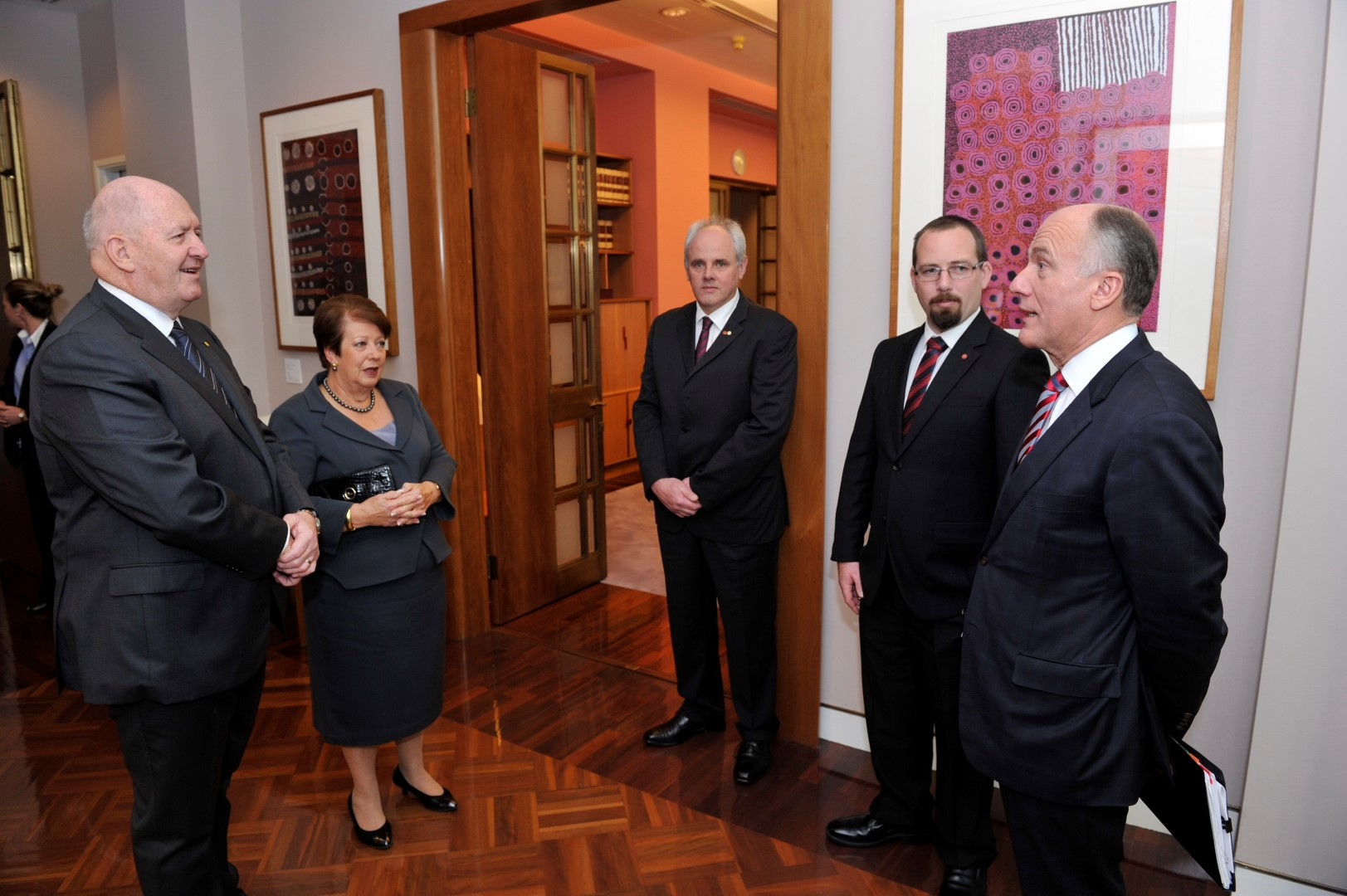
Madigan (centre) with Governor-General Sir Peter Cosgrove (left), Lady Cosgrove, and other Senators in 2014

Madigan served as vice-president of the Victorian DLP from 2008 to 2009 and was elected to the Senate at the 2010 election. Madigan resigned from the DLP and became an independent Senator on 4 September 2014, citing long-term internal party tensions. The party threatened High Court legal action to replace Madigan with a DLP senator.

=== 2010 federal election ===
Madigan won the sixth and last Victorian Senate seat at the 2010 federal election. The primary DLP vote in Victoria of 2.3 percent (75,000 votes) was boosted to the 14.3 percent quota required by gaining One Nation, Christian Democratic and Building Australia preferences. That gave Madigan a 0.2 percent lead over Steve Fielding of the Family First Party, whose preferences then flowed to Madigan. When the Australian Sex Party candidate was excluded, the DLP gained Liberal Democratic Party preferences, overtaking the third Liberal/National candidate and gaining those preferences to win the last seat. Madigan became the first DLP senator from Victoria since Frank McManus and Jack Little, who were both defeated at the double-dissolution election in 1974.

He took his seat in the Senate on 1 July 2011. The Labor government of the time held 31 seats, eight short of a majority, with the Greens holding nine seats, giving them the balance of power. Madigan's vote was unlikely to be a decider in any Senate division because the votes of Greens bloc, paired with either Labor or the Coalition, were enough to win any Senate vote.

=== 2016 election ===
Due to a double dissolution of parliament in 2016, Madigan was unable to serve his full term in parliament. In the 2016 federal election, he was not re-elected, gaining 0.15% of the total Senate vote in the state. John Madigan's Manufacturing and Farming Party was voluntarily deregistered by the Australian Electoral Commission on 13 September 2016.

== Later years and death ==
In December 2018, Madigan announced that he had liver and bowel cancer. He died on 16 June 2020, aged 53, at a palliative care facility near his home in Hepburn Springs. Former prime minister Tony Abbott eulogised Madigan as "a fine representative of a worthy political tradition" with an "old-fashioned sense of courtesy and respect for others".

== Political views ==
Madigan took a strong stance for implementing refugee and protection conventions and gambling reforms.

Madigan campaigned against wind turbines, chairing the 2015 Select Committee on Wind Turbines, advocating the removal of government incentives from the industry, and promoting the idea of "wind turbine syndrome". From 2011 onward, Madigan's chief of staff was Brendan Gullifer, a journalist and writer who has published articles against wind power.

Madigan described himself as "unashamedly pro-life". As a representative of the DLP, he opposed legislation on same-sex marriage; the sale of public infrastructure; the implementation of a carbon tax (stating "We're not in favour of a carbon tax because we believe it's a tax on people and a tax on life"); and the limiting of weekend trading hours. He addressed the Inaugural Jack Kane Dinner in July 2011, where he advocated Chifley-style protectionist economics.

In his maiden speech to the Senate, Madigan denounced Victoria's "inhumane" abortion laws and committed to help restore Australia's dwindling manufacturing sector. He called for a "good Labor government that will bring something better to the people". He said that the DLP and ALP differed in a number of ways, stating:

We both came from the same lineage and however some members on both sides may dislike it, we are kin, of sorts. The ALP has a chance to reaffirm its commitment to that unchanging labour movement. The DLP intends to pursue that vision... During my time here there will no doubt be a number of controversial bills proposed. I do not intend to be deliberately controversial simply for a few cheap headlines but on some issues I cannot be complicit by my silence.

— Senator John Madigan, first speech to the Australian Senate, 25 August 2011.

Madigan also praised fellow crossbench Senator Nick Xenophon in his maiden speech, saying he had "done his best to address the plight of the Australian worker and the Australian family". He shared views on gambling reform and wind turbines with Xenophon, with the pair helping to establish a Select Committee on Wind Turbines.

== John Madigan's Manufacturing and Farming Party ==
John Madigan's Manufacturing and Farming Party
- Leader: John Madigan
- Registered: 18 May 2015
- Dissolved: 13 September 2016
- Split from: Democratic Labour
- Headquarters: Ballarat, Victoria
- Ideology: Agrarianism; Manufacturing advocacy; Populism
- Senate: 1 / 76 (2015–2016)

Website
- manufacturingandfarmingparty.org (archived)

Madigan registered his own party, "John Madigan's Manufacturing and Farming Party," on 18 May 2016. Described as "always a vanity party only for John Madigan's re-election", their only candidates were Madigan and Mark George for Victoria in the Senate in 2016. Following Madigan's defeat, the party were voluntarily deregistered on 13 September 2016.
