= Judith Troeth =

Australian politician

The Honourable Judith Troeth AM
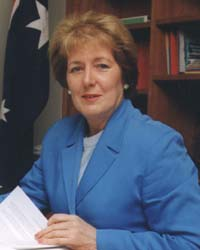

Senator for Victoria
- In office 1 July 1993 – 30 June 2011

Personal details
- Born: 3 August 1940 (age 86) Melbourne, Victoria
- Party: Liberal Party of Australia
- Education: University of Melbourne
- Occupation: Teacher, farmer

Judith Mary Troeth AM (née Ralston; born 3 August 1940) is a former Australian politician. She was a Senator for Victoria from 1993 to 2011, representing the Liberal Party. She served as a parliamentary secretary in the Howard government from 1997 to 2004. Prior to entering politics she was a schoolteacher and farmer.

== Early life ==
Troeth was born on 3 August 1940 in Brighton, Victoria. She is the daughter of Eileen Mary and Keith Malcolm Ralston.

Troeth was educated at Methodist Ladies' College, Melbourne. She later completed the degree of Bachelor of Arts at the University of Melbourne, as well as a diploma in education. She worked as a schoolteacher from 1962 to 1965 and from 1980 to 1987, teaching at schools in Portland and Heywood. She farmed cattle and sheep with her husband near Heywood for three decades.

== Politics ==
Troeth became an officeholder in the Liberal Party in the early 1980s, serving as president of her local branch and holding various positions on committees within the state branch of the party.

=== Senate ===
Troeth was elected to the Senate at the 1993 federal election, to a term beginning on 1 July 1993. She established offices in Warrnambool and the Melbourne suburb of Broadmeadows.

In 1994, Troeth was appointed as a shadow parliamentary secretary under opposition leader Alexander Downer, retaining the role following Downer's replacement by John Howard in 1995. She also served as chair of the Senate's scrutiny of bills committee from 1994 to 1996.

Following the Coalition's victory at the 1996 election, Troeth was appointed chair of the foreign affairs, defence and trade legislation committee. She was appointed as a parliamentary secretary in the Howard government in 1997, initially under John Anderson in the Department of Primary Industries and Energy. In 1998 she moved to the Department of Agriculture, Fisheries and Forestry, working under ministers Mark Vaile and Warren Truss until 2004. She was the first woman to hold a ministerial position within the agriculture portfolio, and also served as chair of the parliamentary Liberal Party's regional and rural committee from 1996 to 2002.

In her final term in the Senate, Troeth served as chair of the Senate's education, employment and workplace relations committee. She supported the Howard government's WorkChoices legislation, although the Australian Labor Party (ALP) minority on the committee issued a dissenting report. In January 2009, Troeth announced she would not be contesting the next election and would retire at the end of her term in June 2011.

=== Political positions ===
Troeth was regarded as a moderate within the Liberal Party and in 2009 stated the party needed to embrace moderate and progressive views if it were to return to government. She came into conflict with Peter Costello's faction on a number of occasions and faced preselection challenges prior to the 1998 and 2004 elections. In 2007 she stated that a cult of personality had developed around Costello within the Victorian branch of the Liberals.

Troeth supported "free and unfettered access" to abortion. In 2006 she was part of a bipartisan working group which succeeding in passing a private member's bill removing the power of the health minister to veto importation of the abortifacient RU-486, thereby increasing the accessibility of abortion.

Troeth was "a vocal advocate for the humane treatment of refugees and asylum seekers", although she also spoke of "the necessity for strong border protection". In 2006, she played a key role in defeating the Howard government's plan to mandate offshore processing for all asylum seekers arriving by vote, with Howard ultimately withdrawing the legislation after Troeth stated she could not support its passage. In 2009, she was the only Liberal senator to cross the floor to vote in favour of ending the practice of charging immigration detainees for their time in detention, stating "these punitive sort of charges and the putting up of these barriers should never be happening and I will be proud to be in a legislature that legislates to take this law off the statute books".

Troeth supported Malcolm Turnbull against Tony Abbott in the November 2009 leadership spill and Turnbull's stance in favour of the Rudd government's Carbon Pollution Reduction Scheme. Following Abbott's victory over Turnbull, the Liberal Party reversed its position and decided to oppose the scheme. Troeth and fellow Liberal senator Sue Boyce subsequently crossed the floor to vote in favour of the scheme in December 2009.

== Later activities ==
In 2012, Troeth was appointed chair of the board of Austin Health, which runs Melbourne's Austin Hospital. In the same year, she unsuccessfully sought election to the board of Methodist Ladies' College, after publicly criticising the existing board for its dismissal of the incumbent school principal.

Also in 2012, she was inducted onto the Victorian Honour Roll of Women.

Troeth remained involved in the Liberal Party after leaving parliament and has advocated for the introduction of quotas for female candidates.
