= Kay Patterson =

Kay Patterson may refer to:

- Kay Patterson (Australian politician)
- Kay Patterson (American politician)
