= Brendan Gullifer =

Australian writer based in Melbourne (born 1959)

- Born: 1959 (age 66–67); Melbourne, Australia
- Writing career
- Notable works: The Pocketbook of Aussie Patriotism, Sold

Brendan Gullifer (born 1959) is an Australian writer based in Wagga Wagga who was chief of staff to the independent Victorian senator John Madigan.

His first book, The Pocket book of Aussie Patriotism, a compact guide to Australian history, was published by Black Inc books in January 2007. Gullifer's debut novel, Sold, a black comedy set in the Melbourne real estate industry, was published in April 2009 by Sleepers Publishing.

Gullifer produced and hosted two podcasts, The Naked Novelist, for fiction writers, and The Chill Factory, featuring new releases in jazz, ambient, new age and world music. They had upwards of 50,000 downloads. In May 2007, he began co-hosting Published or Not, a weekly program for writers on Melbourne radio station 3CR. He has also made appearances at Scotch College as part of its Literature Festival.

Gullifer has a master's degree in creative media from RMIT University and post-graduate qualifications in teaching English. Gullifer has also published material on "Stop These Things", an anti-wind website.

He left Victoria to Danger Island, NSW, after leaving the role of chief of staff with John Madigan.
