= Barney Cooney =

Australian politician (1934–2019)

Senator for Victoria
- In office 1 December 1984 – 30 June 2002

Personal details
- Born: 11 July 1934 Currie, Tasmania
- Died: 9 February 2019 (aged 84) Melbourne, Victoria
- Party: Australian Labor Party
- Education: University of Melbourne
- Occupation: Barrister

Bernard Cornelius Cooney (11 July 1934 – 9 February 2019) was an Australian politician.

Cooney was born at Currie on King Island in Tasmania. His family moved to the regional Victorian town of Culgoa in 1937, and subsequently moved through several other Victorian towns and suburbs: Deer Park, Gunbower, Yarck and South Melbourne. He was educated at the Cohuna and Alexandra high schools and at St Kevin's College in Melbourne, before studying law at the University of Melbourne.

Cooney undertook his articled clerkship with Melbourne firm Alexander Grant Dickson and King, and was admitted to the bar in 1961. He practised largely in personal injury and industrial law.

In 1984, he was elected to the Australian Senate as a Labor Senator for Victoria. He served on a wide range of parliamentary committees and chaired several, including the Scrutiny of Bills Committee. He argued strongly in favour of civil liberties throughout his time in parliament, strongly opposing the Australia Card, restrictions on the legal rights of asylum seekers and anti-terror laws he viewed as "draconian". He stated that he "never contemplated the ministry", but "used to oppose things in caucus a lot". He held his Senate seat until his retirement in 2002.

Cooney continued to practise as a barrister throughout and after his parliamentary career. He died in February 2019 after a long illness.
