= Raff Ciccone =

Australian politician

Senator Raff Ciccone
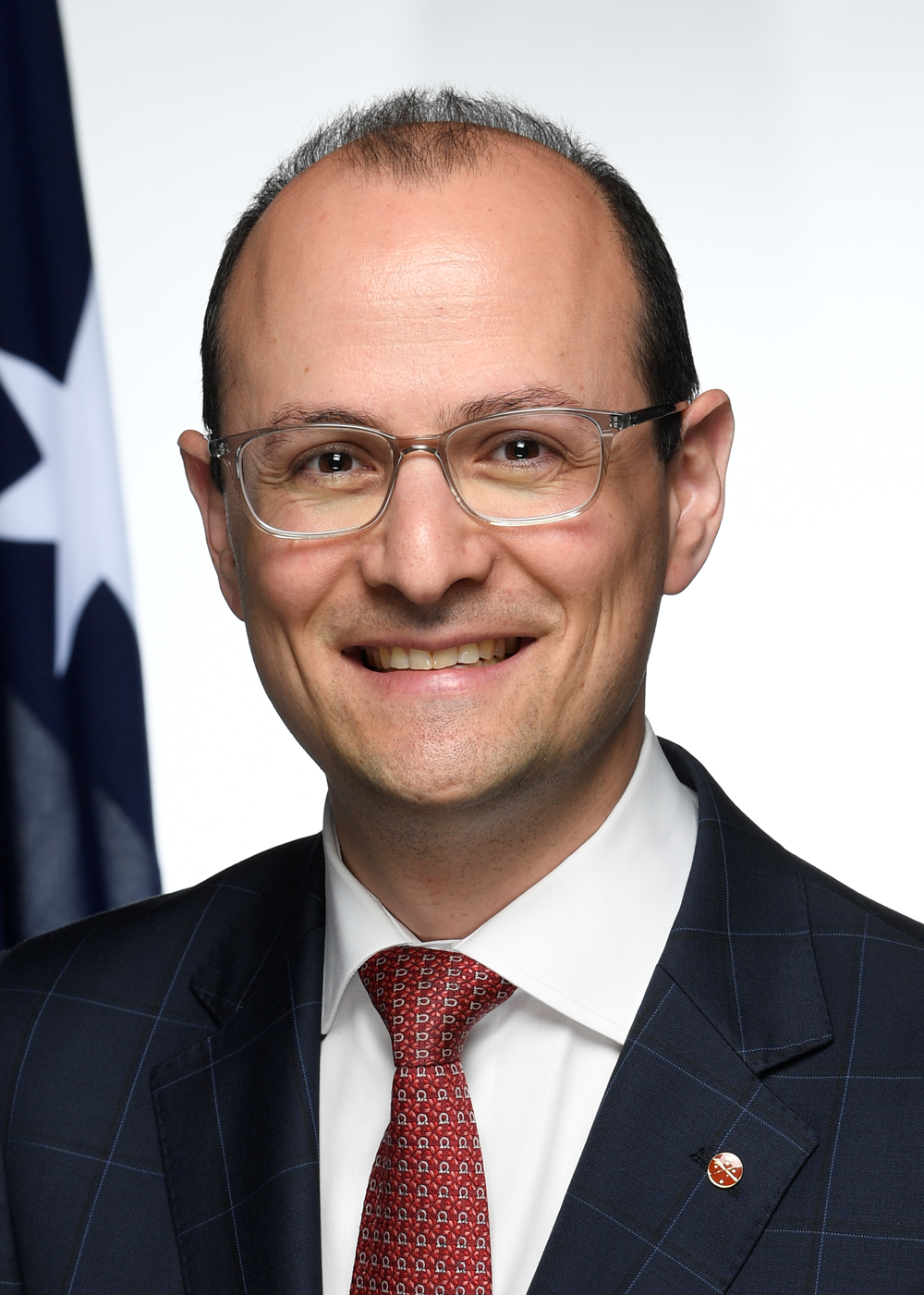
- Official portrait, 2021

Senator for Victoria
- Incumbent
- Assumed office 6 March 2019
- Preceded by: Jacinta Collins

Personal details
- Born: Raffaele Ciccone; 1 November 1983 (age 43) Melbourne, Victoria, Australia
- Citizenship: Australian
- Party: Labor
- Education: Deakin University; University of Melbourne
- Website: senatorciccone.com.au

Raffaele "Raff" Ciccone (born 1 November 1983) is an Australian politician who has served as Senator for Victoria since 2019. He is a member of the Labor Party and was appointed to the Senate following the resignation of Jacinta Collins, making him the 100th Senator to represent Victoria.

== Early life ==
Ciccone grew up in the Melbourne suburb of Huntingdale with his parents and brother. His parents immigrated to Australia from Italy in the late 1960s.

He received his education at local Catholic primary schools, first attending Christ Our Holy Redeemer Primary School in Oakleigh East, before going on to Salesian College in Chadstone. As a teenager, he worked at the local dry cleaners. Ciccone went on to pursue bachelor's degrees, in arts and commerce at Deakin University and the University of Melbourne. He joined the Australian Labor Party (Victorian Branch) at the age of 16 when in high school.

After graduating from university, Ciccone initially worked in financial planning before moving into industrial relations and employment law, later becoming a senior official in the Shop, Distributive and Allied Employees Association (SDA). The role allowed him to advocate for better pay and conditions for workers in the retail sector, including fast food and warehousing workers. Notably, this included recovering wages for convenience store workers who had been underpaid by 7-Eleven.

Ciccone was elected to the community health board of Link Health and Community (formerly MonashLink) in 2009 and served until 2019, including a term as Chair from December 2017.

== Politics ==
Ciccone joined the Australian Labor Party in 2000 and, while studying, worked as a research officer to Senator the Hon. Jacinta Collins. As a party member, he eventually became the vice-president of the Australian Labor Party in Victoria. He was unsuccessful in his attempts at the Monash City Council local government elections of 2008 and 2016, and on Labor's Senate ticket in Victoria at the 2013 federal election. When Senator Collins resigned from the Senate ahead of the 2019 federal election, Ciccone was nominated to fill the casual vacancy.

Ciccone was appointed to the Senate by a joint sitting of the Victorian Parliament on 6 March 2019, taking Collins' place, and becoming the 100th Senator to represent the people of Victoria. In the 46th Parliament of Australia, he served as Deputy Opposition Whip in the Senate and on the Parliament's Joint Standing Committees on Migration and on Treaties. He also served as Chair of the Senate Select Committee on Temporary Migration.

On 7 August 2020, Ciccone was appointed to the ALP's national executive.

From 2020 to 2022, Ciccone served on the Joint Standing Committee on Trade and Investment and Growth. He was a member of the Senate Legal and Constitutional Affairs Committee from 2021 to 2024 and the Senate Rural and Regional Affairs and Transport Committee from 2021 to 2025.

Following the 2022 federal election, Ciccone became Government Deputy Whip in the Senate and was elected Chair of the Senate Foreign Affairs, Defence and Trade Legislation Committee. He was also appointed to the Parliamentary Joint Committee on Intelligence and Security, the Joint Standing Committee on Foreign Affairs, Defence and Trade Committee, and Deputy Chair of the Senate Scrutiny of Bills Committee.

On 9 April 2022 Ciccone was awarded honorary membership of the Hawthorn branch of the Returned and Services League for advocacy of veterans’ welfare and the establishment of a Royal Commission into Defence and Veteran Suicide.

In an historic first, on 7 February 2024 during the first parliamentary sitting week of the year, Ciccone became the first father to bring his baby onto the floor of the Australian Parliament.

Ciccone was elected Chair of the Parliamentary Joint Committee on Intelligence and Security on October 8 following the resignation of Peter Khalil MP, who stood down to focus on his new role as Special Envoy for Social Cohesion.

Ciccone is Chair of the Parliamentary Country Groups for Italy, Switzerland, the United Arab Emirates and the European Parliament and Holy See. He is also the Co-Chair of the Parliamentary Friendship Groups of Fresh Produce; Forestry, Timber and Paper Products; and Red Meat.

== Political views ==
=== Foreign policy ===
In October 2020 it was reported that Ciccone had joined an informal cross-party grouping of parliamentarians, known as the "Wolverines", who take a hawkish position on China. By 2022, he was known to be a member of the Inter-Parliamentary Alliance on China. Ciccone has argued for Australia's agriculture industry to be considered part of national security. He is one of a handful of Australian parliamentarians openly supporting an autonomous, free Taiwan and attended the Presidential inauguration of Lai Ching-te in May 2024. Ciccone has spoken in support of Australian sanctions on Iran in response to the Islamic regime’s horrific use of violence against its own citizens. He has also endorsed the Australian Government’s listing of the Islamic Revolutionary Guard Corps as a state sponsor of terrorism under the Criminal Code. On 5 February 2026, Ciccone co-sponsored a motion in the Australian Senate condemning the violent repression of peaceful protesters and standing with the people of Iran, which passed unanimously.

=== Environment and energy ===
Ciccone is a strong supporter of Australia's timber industry, arguing the industry can help to reduce the country's carbon emissions. He has criticised the Labor government in Victoria for its decision to phase out native forest harvesting by 2030. He is connected to a pro-resources grouping of his party, known as the Otis Group, and has argued against the ALP's opposition to nuclear power in Australia. He has argued that carbon emissions from agriculture should be reduced, requiring collaboration between government and the agriculture industry. Ciccone has criticised climate change activists for arguing that environmental interests and industry interests are opposed.

=== Industry and industrial relations ===
Ciccone has long advocated stronger penalties against employers committing wage theft, a rise in unemployment benefits, and greater protection of rights for gig workers. During his first term in Parliament, he called for the criminalisation of wage theft and the establishment of a small-claims tribunal to simplify the recovery of stolen wages.

He has been a leading supporter of the $15 billion National Reconstruction Fund, directed to value-adding in the production of food and fibre. Speaking at its launch in March 2023, he argued that while COVID-19 had revealed the vulnerability to global supply chains, it also showed Australia's "great potential to improve our domestic capability."

=== Migration and migrant workers ===
In 2019, Ciccone was appointed by the Senate to chair a Select Committee on Temporary Migration to examine the impact of temporary migration on the Australian economy, workplace rights and social cohesion. In 2021, Ciccone delivered the Committee’s report to the Senate. The report recommended the Australian Government establish a tripartite body to inform Australia’s temporary migration programs, laws and policies, and identify skills shortages. It also recommended that employers obtain accreditation before employing temporary migrants and lose this if they breach workplace laws. To reduce reliance on migration, Ciccone also called for an increase to the Temporary Skilled Migration Income Threshold, and additional education and training initiatives to encourage Australians to fill skills shortages.

=== Intelligence and defence ===
Ciccone has focused heavily on intelligence, security and defence during his time in Parliament. He has advocated for the modernisation of the Australian Defence Force, highlighting the significance of the AUKUS agreement, improving personnel and veteran welfare, and strengthening Australia’s readiness to respond to security challenges. As Chair of the Parliamentary Joint Committee on Intelligence and Security since October 2024, Ciccone has overseen scrutiny of Australia’s intelligence and security agencies, ensuring they operate effectively and within legal frameworks.

== Personal life ==
Ciccone was married to Dimity Paul, who was once chief of staff to Victorian government minister Adem Somyurek and stood as a Labor candidate at the 2014 state election. Ciccone is a "devoted" supporter of Collingwood Football Club. He owns an investment property in Huntingdale and Oakleigh East.
