= Shirley McKerrow =

Australian politician

Shirley McKerrow OAM
- Born: Shirley Margaret Gardini; 18 September 1933
- Died: 16 October 2023 (aged 90); Darwin, Northern Territory
- Education: University of Melbourne
- Political party: National Party of Australia
- Spouse: John Alexander McKerrow (1955–1996)
- Children: 4
- Awards: Centenary Medal (2001); Medal of the Order of Australia (2002)

Shirley Margaret McKerrow OAM (née Gardini; 18 September 1933 – 16 October 2023) was the first woman to serve as federal president of an Australian political party, as president of the National Party from 1981 to 1987.

McKerrow was born to Dante Gardini and Margaret (Peggy), née Kelly. She attended Genazzano Convent in Kew and Ingergowrie Homecrafts Hostel in Hawthorn before studying at the University of Melbourne. In 1955 she married John Alexander McKerrow, with whom she had four children. She served on the central council of the Country Party from 1972 and was a junior vice-president from 1975 to 1976. In 1976 she became the first woman to serve as state president of an Australian party, becoming president of the Victorian branch of the renamed National Party and serving until 1980. In 1980, McKerrow unsuccessfully contested the preselection for the casual vacancy caused by the resignation of Senator James Webster.

In 1981 McKerrow became federal president of the National Party, again the first woman to hold this position for an Australian party; she held this position until her retirement in 1987. In 2001 she received the Centenary Medal for services to Australian politics and was inducted onto the Victorian Honour Roll of Women. In 2002 she was awarded the Medal of the Order of Australia.

Party political offices
Preceded by David Evand MLA	State President of the National Party of Victoria; 1976–1980	Succeeded by Stuart MacDonald
Preceded by Sir Thomas Drake-Brockman	Federal President of the National Party of Australia; 1981–1987	Succeeded by Stuart McDonald
Preceded by N/A	Company Director John McEwan House Pty Ltd; 1987–2021	Succeeded by N/A
Preceded by N/A	Trustee John McEwan House Fund; 1991–2021	Succeeded by N/A
Preceded by Brigadier the Hon David Thomson MC	Company Chairman John McEwan House Pty Ltd; 1997–2016	Succeeded by John Tanner AO
