= Jean Melzer =

Australian politician

Jean Melzer OAM
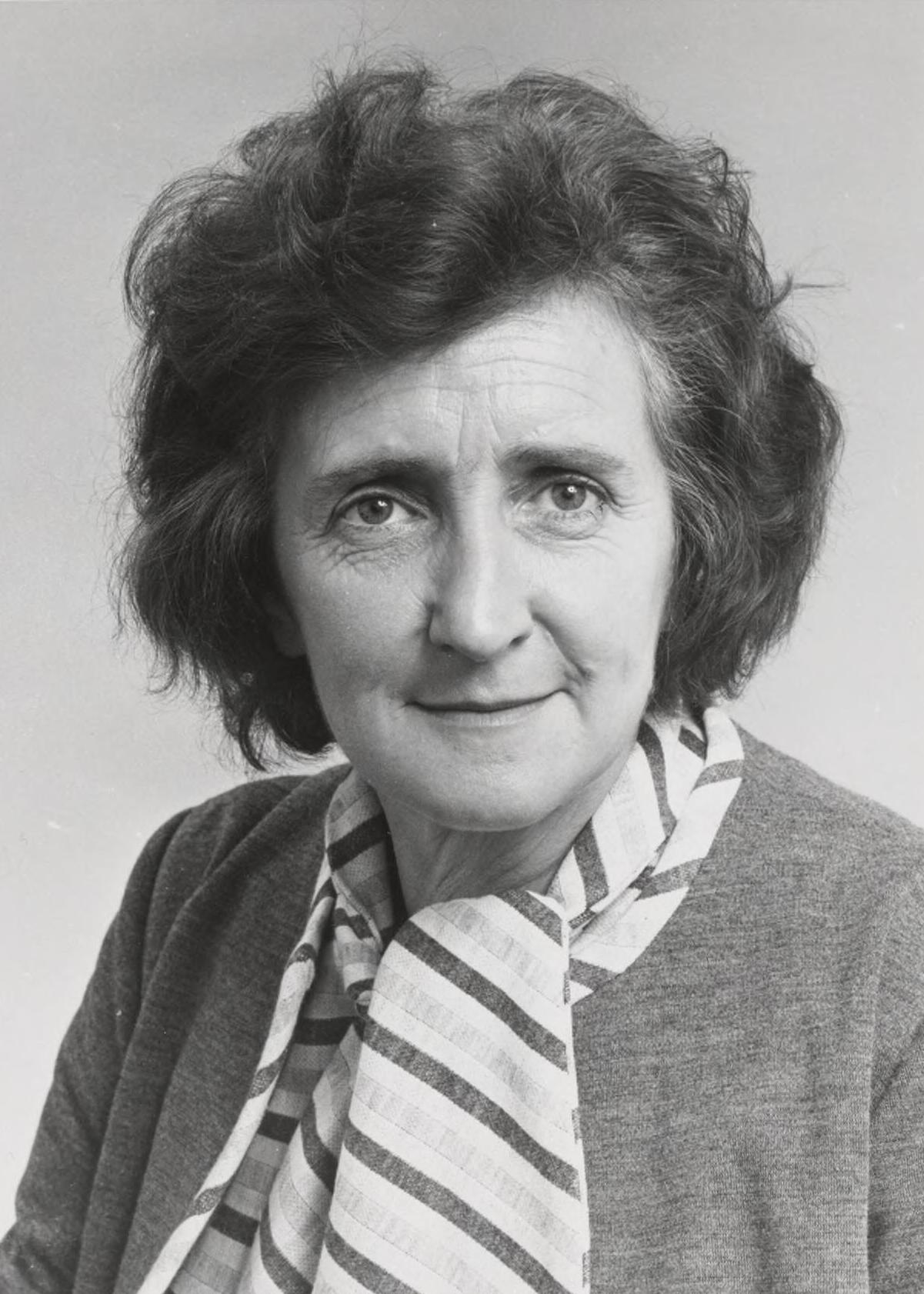
- Melzer in 1974

Senator for Victoria
- In office 18 May 1974 – 30 June 1981

Personal details
- Born: Jean Isabel McLeod; 7 February 1926 Elsternwick, Victoria, Australia
- Died: 18 June 2013 (aged 87) Malvern, Victoria, Australia
- Party: Communist (to 1957); Labor (c. 1966–1984); NDP (1984–1985)
- Spouse(s): William Griffiths (m. 1946; div. 1961) Wilton Melzer (m. 1961; div. 1974)
- Occupation: Clerk

Jean Isabel Melzer OAM (née McLeod); 7 February 1926 – 18 June 2013) was an Australian politician and activist. She was a Senator for Victoria from 1974 to 1981, representing the Australian Labor Party (ALP). A long-time supporter of the anti-war and anti-nuclear movements, she left the party in 1984 over its failure to ban uranium mining and stood unsuccessfully for the Nuclear Disarmament Party at the 1984 federal election.

== Early life ==
Melzer was born on 7 February 1926 in Elsternwick, Victoria. She was the daughter of Lilian Rosa (née Ford) and George Kenneth McLeod. Her father, a World War I veteran, was an accountant and civil servant.

Melzer was educated at Ormond State School, Ormond East State School, and Gardenvale Central School, completing her secondary education at Mac.Robertson Girls' High School from 1939 to 1941. Her father committed suicide in 1940 and she had to leave school early to support her family. She began working as a clerk with the State Rivers and Water Supply Commission and later worked for radio station 3AW and for the Building Workers' Industrial Union.

== Politics and activism ==
=== Early years ===
Melzer joined the Communist Party of Australia as a teenager. She was active in the leftist New Theatre as an actor, assistant director, and costume designer. She left the Communist Party in 1957.

In the 1960s, Melzer was active in the peace movement and was involved with the United Nations Association, the Women's International League for Peace and Freedom, the Victorian Council for Civil Liberties, and the League of Women Voters of Victoria. In response to Australia's involvement in the Vietnam War, she joined the anti-conscription Save Our Sons movement and participated in anti-war demonstrations.

Melzer joined the Australian Labor Party (ALP) after the 1966 federal election. She became secretary of the Camberwell branch and was campaign manager for the federal seat of Chisholm. She was appointed state secretary of the ALP in 1971 and was the chief organiser of the party's campaign in Victoria at the 1972 election, which saw the election of the Whitlam government.

=== Senate ===
She was elected at the 1974 election, becoming the first woman Labor senator from Victoria. In 1978 she was the first woman elected as the Secretary of the Labor Caucus. She served two terms, being defeated at the 1980 election as she was placed third on the Labor ticket. Her final term ended on 30 June 1981.

She stood unsuccessfully as the lead Victorian senate candidate for the Nuclear Disarmament Party in the 1984 election. She received 7.1% of the vote.

Melzer was inducted onto the Victorian Honour Roll of Women in 2006.

== Personal life ==
Melzer had four children with her first husband, William Griffiths, whom she married in 1946. She was divorced in 1961 and remarried in the same year to Wilton Melzer, with whom she had another two children. Her second marriage also ended in divorce in 1974, the same year she was elected to the Senate.

Melzer was the president of U3A Network Victoria. She died on 18 June 2013.

== Potential sources ==
- MS 3683 Records of the Women's Electoral Lobby (Australia) Series 7: Political lobbying records, 1972–89 folder 18–19 held at NLA
- Paper presented at National Labor Women's Conference, Canberra, 29 January-1 February 1982
- Paper presented at 2nd Women and Labour Conference, Melbourne, 17 May 1980 paper called "Is Parliament Relevant to Women and. Their Search for Identity?"
