= Steve Fielding =

Australian politician (born 1960)

Senator for Victoria
- In office 1 July 2005 – 30 June 2011
- Preceded by: Tsebin Tchen
- Succeeded by: John Madigan

Personal details
- Born: 17 October 1960 (age 66) Melbourne, Victoria, Australia
- Party: Family First Party (2004−2017)
- Education: RMIT University; Monash University
- Profession: Engineer

Steven Fielding (born 17 October 1960) is a former Australian senator for the state of Victoria and the former federal parliamentary leader of the Family First Party. He was elected to the upper house at the 2004 federal election on two per cent of the first-preference votes. He failed to gain re-election at the 2010 federal election. His term ended on 30 June 2011.

== Early life ==
Fielding was born on 17 October 1960, in Melbourne, where he was raised in the suburb of Reservoir. His parents, Shirley and George Fielding, had a large family consisting of 16 children, and Fielding spent much of his childhood sharing a bedroom with five brothers in the family's three-bedroom home. His early education was at the local Keon Park Primary School, He later attended the nearby Merrilands High School.

Academically, Fielding suffered setbacks through an undiagnosed case of dyslexia, and this led to problems studying subjects such as English. Nevertheless, he excelled in mathematics, and his high marks in this subject allowed him to graduate with sufficiently high scores to gain entry into the Bachelor of Engineering degree at Royal Melbourne Institute of Technology (RMIT), where he studied electronic engineering. Upon graduating in 1983, Fielding accepted a position at Hewlett-Packard, and later he moved into management at technology firms NEC and Siemens.

Fielding returned to university to undertake a Master of Business Administration (MBA) at Monash University, completing it in 1992. He later moved to Wellington, New Zealand, where he worked for Telecom New Zealand in "change management" during a difficult time for the industry, as it was undergoing deregulation. He returned to Australia three years later, in 1995, and worked for United Energy, the Australian Yellow Pages and as a marketing manager at Vision Super.

Fielding entered politics in 2003 when he successfully stood as an independent candidate for the Knox City Council. He has described the decision to stand as "very last-minute", but others, such as then-Knox mayor Jenny Moore and then-Victorian Labor MP Peter Lockwood said Fielding was very open about his intent to move into federal politics. Both Lockwood and Labor MP Bob Stensholt described how Fielding later made inquiries about the possibility of running for one of the major parties, before eventually joining Family First in 2004.

== 2004 election ==
Fielding was elected to represent Victoria in the Senate at the 2004 federal election. He was the first representative of Family First to be elected to the Federal Parliament.

Fielding's election was not expected – Family First had only been founded two years before the election, and it was not expected to succeed in its first federal election in Victoria. Like many senators, Fielding gained a quota under the Senate's proportional representation system by receiving preferences from other parties (see Australian electoral system). The Australian Democrats and the Labor Party agreed to swap preferences with Family First, but Fielding benefited from the larger-than-expected surplus of Liberal preferences. He was able to stay in the count long enough to receive Democrat and Labor preferences, defeating Greens candidate David Risstrom for the last Senate place in Victoria. As a result, Fielding was elected although his party as a whole received just 56,376 votes (1.9%) for the Senate in Victoria.

When first elected, the Howard government held a slim majority in the Senate, sufficient that Fielding would only hold the balance of power if one of the government senators chose to cross the floor. This changed after the 2007 federal election (the changes of which took effect in 2008), when the balance of power in the Senate shifted to a combination of Fielding, the five Australian Greens senators and independent Nick Xenophon.

== Federal politics ==
While Family First is generally regarded as a conservative party, Fielding stated he would not be an automatic supporter of the then Coalition opposition in the Senate. On some issues which he saw as affecting the wellbeing of families, such as the WorkChoices industrial relations policies, he indicated disagreement with government policies. In February 2009, he told a Senate hearing that he believed divorce added to the impact of global warming because it resulted in people switching to a "resource-inefficient lifestyle".

=== Balance of power ===
With some backbenchers being willing to cross the floor, Fielding's vote was important on some of the Howard government's more controversial legislation. His vote ensured the passage of Voluntary student unionism, the overturning of civil unions legislation in the Australian Capital Territory, and changes to media ownership laws. Conversely, his intention to vote "no" ensured the defeat of the Howard government's proposed tightening of asylum seeker laws.

=== Climate change ===
In mid-2009, Fielding flew to the US on a self-funded trip to discover more about climate change. He came back unconvinced that man-made carbon dioxide emissions were the main driver of climate change. He subsequently voted against the Rudd government's Carbon Pollution Reduction Scheme. Fielding also attended the Copenhagen Climate Conference in December 2009.

=== Youth allowance ===
In 2009 Fielding teamed up with the coalition to defeat the government's proposed changes to the youth allowance system. He said the changes were unfair to rural and regional students and that it would leave 26,000 students worse off.

=== Alcohol ===
Fielding opposed the Rudd government's alcopops tax. He argued that taxing ready to drink alcohol beverages wouldn't put an end to binge drinking. He campaigned for the government to act against the practice.

=== Stimulus package ===
After the 2008 financial crisis, the Rudd government passed an economic stimulus package with the help of Family First. As part of the deal Fielding secured a $200 million jobs fund called 'Get Communities Working'.

=== Voluntary Student Unionism ===
At the end of his campaign in support of the Howard government's Voluntary Student Unionism legislation, which was passed, the walls of Fielding's office were vandalised with pro-union graffiti.

=== Luxury car tax ===
An increase to the luxury car tax was defeated in the Senate on 4 September 2008, with Fielding joining the coalition in blocking the budget legislation. It was passed after Fielding negotiated exemptions for farmers and tourism operators.

=== Considered changing parties ===
In early 2008, Fielding reportedly considered breaking away from Family First to establish a new political party, inviting Tim Costello and other "big names" to join him. The revelations came after Fielding changed his position on abortion, after being rebuffed by his party for taking a softer approach.

=== ISP level content filtering ===
Fielding gave conditional support to the mandatory ISP level filtering scheme. A spokesperson for Family First indicated that the party would want X18+ rated and refused classification (RC) content banned for everyone, including adults. Fielding's support for Internet censorship in Australia was not reported on his official website.

=== Paid Parental Leave Scheme ===
In June 2010, during the Senate discussion on the proposed Paid Parental Leave Scheme, Fielding suggested "some women may rort the scheme by deliberately falling pregnant and then having a late-term abortion". He was subsequently criticised by all sides of Australian politics for these comments.

=== Legislation ===
Fielding introduced the following legislation into Parliament:

- Protecting Problem Gamblers Bill 2009
- Keeping Jobs from Going Offshore (Protection of Personal Information) Bill 2009
- Britt Lapthorne Bill 2009
- Removing Branding from Cigarette Packs Bill 2009
- Keeping Banks Accountable Bill 2009
- Removal of Excessive Super Bill 2009
- Easy Comparison of Grocery Prices Bill 2008
- Poker Machine Harm Minimisation Bill 2008
- Poker Machine Harm Reduction Tax Bill 2008
- Alcohol Toll Reduction Bill 2007
- Restoring Family Work Balance Bill 2007
- Fair Bank and Credit Card Fees Bill 2007
- Predatory Pricing Bill 2007
- Creeping Acquisitions 2007 Bill

== Stunts ==
Fielding's use of publicity stunts was commented on by The Sydney Morning Herald. in May 2008, he joined protesting pensioners, who brought traffic to a standstill in the Melbourne CBD, when he and others took their shirts off in the style of the cab drivers who had successfully stripped for increased cab security, to demand $70- to $100-a-week rise in the pension.

Fielding also dressed as a giant beer bottle to promote Family First's proposed policy to introduce a bottle return scheme.

== Personal life ==
Fielding is a Christian and attends CityLife Church, a large Pentecostal church in Melbourne. He rejects evolution and has publicly espoused his belief in Young Earth creationism. Fielding has three children. He has claimed he was sexually abused by a scoutmaster and family friend for two years when he was a teenager. No-one has been charged or prosecuted for the alleged offences.
