= Electoral results for the Division of Ballarat =

Australian division election results

This is a list of electoral results for the Division of Ballarat in Australian federal elections from the division's creation in 1901 until the present. The seat was known as Ballaarat from 1901 until 1977.

== Members ==
Member	Party	Term
Alfred Deakin	Protectionist	1901–1909
Alfred Deakin	Liberal	1909–1913
Charles McGrath	Labor	1913–1919
Edwin Kerby	Nationalist	1919–1920
Charles McGrath	Labor	1920–1931
Charles McGrath	Independent	1931–1931
Charles McGrath	United Australia	1931–1934
Archibald Fisken	United Australia	1934–1937
Reg Pollard	Labor	1937–1949
Alan Pittard	Liberal	1949–1951
Bob Joshua	Labor	1951–1955
Bob Joshua	Labor (A-C)	1955–1955
Dudley Erwin	Liberal	1955–1975
Jim Short	Liberal	1975–1980
John Mildren	Labor	1980–1990
Michael Ronaldson	Liberal	1990–2001
Catherine King	Labor	2001–present

== Election results ==
=== Elections in the 2020s ===
==== 2025 ====
2025 Australian federal election: Ballarat
Party	Candidate	Votes	%	±%
Liberal	Paula Doran			
Greens	John Barnes			
One Nation	Terri Pryse-Smith			
Labor	Catherine King			
Independent	Luke Parker			
Libertarian	Ryan Redfern			
Family First	Ian Maxwell Harkness			
Total formal votes				
Informal votes				
Turnout				

==== 2022 ====
2022 Australian federal election: Ballarat
Party	Candidate	Votes	%	±%
Labor	Catherine King	43,171	44.74	−2.15
Liberal	Ben Green	26,142	27.09	−4.57
Greens	John Barnes	14,076	14.59	+5.61
United Australia	Terri Pryse-Smith	3,693	3.83	−0.77
One Nation	Rosalie Taxis	3,476	3.60	+3.60
Liberal Democrats	Julia McGrath	3,216	3.33	+3.33
Independent	Alex Graham	2,044	2.12	+0.85
Federation	Kerryn Sedgman	682	0.71	+0.71
Total formal votes		96,500	94.97	−0.83
Informal votes		5,109	5.03	+0.83
Turnout		101,609	91.90	−1.92
Two-party-preferred result
Labor	Catherine King	60,770	62.97	+2.74
Liberal	Ben Green	35,730	37.03	−2.74
Labor hold		Swing	+2.74	

Alluvial diagram for preference flows in the seat of Ballarat in the 2022 federal election. indicates at what stage the winning candidate had over 50% of the votes and was declared the winner.

=== Elections in the 2010s ===
==== 2019 ====
2019 Australian federal election: Ballarat
Party	Candidate	Votes	%	±%
Labor	Catherine King	49,077	47.79	+4.50
Liberal	Tim Vo	31,462	30.64	−4.05
Greens	Karen McAloon	9,077	8.84	−2.01
United Australia	Peter Cozyn	4,741	4.62	+4.62
Animal Justice	Bryn Hills	4,393	4.28	+4.28
Independent	Nick Shady	2,288	2.23	+2.23
Independent	Alex Graham	1,645	1.60	+1.60
Total formal votes		102,683	95.63	+0.92
Informal votes		4,689	4.37	−0.92
Turnout		107,372	93.40	+1.03
Two-party-preferred result
Labor	Catherine King	62,615	60.98	+3.62
Liberal	Tim Vo	40,068	39.02	−3.62
Labor hold		Swing	+3.62	

==== 2016 ====
2016 Australian federal election: Ballarat
Party	Candidate	Votes	%	±%
Labor	Catherine King	42,275	43.27	+1.36
Liberal	Sarah Wade	33,931	34.73	−3.27
Greens	Alice Barnes	10,551	10.80	+1.29
National	Paul Tatchell	4,108	4.20	+4.20
Christians	Dianne Colbert	2,023	2.07	+0.85
Family First	Graham Howard	1,896	1.94	+0.72
Independent	Bren Eckel	1,802	1.84	+1.84
Rise Up Australia	Tran Tran	1,121	1.15	+0.91
Total formal votes		97,707	94.71	−0.63
Informal votes		5,461	5.29	+0.63
Turnout		103,168	93.15	−1.77
Two-party-preferred result
Labor	Catherine King	56,002	57.32	+2.43
Liberal	Sarah Wade	41,705	42.68	−2.43
Labor hold		Swing	+2.43	

==== 2013 ====
2013 Australian federal election: Ballarat
Party	Candidate	Votes	%	±%
Labor	Catherine King	39,251	41.91	−9.84
Liberal	John Fitzgibbon	35,592	38.00	+4.05
Greens	Stephanie Hodgins-May	8,911	9.51	−1.83
Palmer United	Gerard Murphy	3,396	3.63	+3.63
Sex Party	Joshua Mathieson	2,135	2.28	+2.28
Christians	Anne Foster	1,139	1.22	+1.22
Family First	Shane Clark	1,139	1.22	−1.74
Democratic Labour	Stephen Vereker	1,022	1.09	+1.09
Katter's Australian	Shane Dunne	849	0.91	+0.91
Rise Up Australia	Ana Rojas	229	0.24	+0.24
Total formal votes		93,663	95.34	−0.94
Informal votes		4,578	4.66	+0.94
Turnout		98,241	94.94	+0.14
Two-party-preferred result
Labor	Catherine King	51,411	54.89	−6.81
Liberal	John Fitzgibbon	42,252	45.11	+6.81
Labor hold		Swing	−6.81	

==== 2010 ====
2010 Australian federal election: Ballarat
Party	Candidate	Votes	%	±%
Labor	Catherine King	46,289	51.75	+1.42
Liberal	Mark Banwell	30,364	33.95	−4.09
Greens	Belinda Coates	10,140	11.34	+3.36
Family First	Jim Rainey	2,646	2.96	−0.69
Total formal votes		89,439	96.28	−1.31
Informal votes		3,456	3.72	+1.31
Turnout		92,895	94.98	−1.11
Two-party-preferred result
Labor	Catherine King	55,188	61.70	+3.55
Liberal	Mark Banwell	34,251	38.30	−3.55
Labor hold		Swing	+3.55	

=== Elections in the 2000s ===
==== 2007 ====
2007 Australian federal election: Ballarat
Party	Candidate	Votes	%	±%
Labor	Catherine King	44,191	50.33	+5.33
Liberal	Samantha McIntosh	33,402	38.04	−6.53
Greens	Belinda Coates	7,008	7.98	+1.25
Family First	Dale Butterfield	3,207	3.65	+1.50
Total formal votes		87,808	97.59	+0.93
Informal votes		2,170	2.41	−0.93
Turnout		89,978	96.11	+0.15
Two-party-preferred result
Labor	Catherine King	51,056	58.15	+5.92
Liberal	Samantha McIntosh	36,752	41.85	−5.92
Labor hold		Swing	+5.92	

==== 2004 ====
2004 Australian federal election: Ballarat
Party	Candidate	Votes	%	±%
Labor	Catherine King	37,734	45.00	+0.50
Liberal	Elizabeth Matuschka	37,377	44.57	+2.45
Greens	Tony Kelly	5,641	6.73	+0.07
Family First	Vlad Adamek	1,799	2.14	+2.14
Democratic Labor	Claire Lindorff	1,109	1.32	+1.32
Citizens Electoral Council	Valiant von Thule Halborg	192	0.23	+0.23
Total formal votes		83,852	96.66	−0.33
Informal votes		2,901	3.34	+0.33
Turnout		86,753	95.96	−0.35
Two-party-preferred result
Labor	Catherine King	43,795	52.23	−1.02
Liberal	Elizabeth Matuschka	40,057	47.77	+1.02
Labor hold		Swing	−1.02	

==== 2001 ====
2001 Australian federal election: Ballarat
Party	Candidate	Votes	%	±%
Labor	Catherine King	35,558	44.14	+3.23
Liberal	Charles Collins	34,512	42.85	−2.39
Greens	Tony Kelly	5,126	6.36	+4.95
Democrats	Danii Coric	3,300	4.10	+0.40
One Nation	John Blanchard	2,053	2.55	−2.35
Total formal votes		80,549	97.12	+0.67
Informal votes		2,391	2.88	−0.67
Turnout		82,940	97.65	
Two-party-preferred result
Labor	Catherine King	42,471	52.73	+5.50
Liberal	Charles Collins	38,078	47.27	−5.50
Labor gain from Liberal		Swing	+5.50	

=== Elections in the 1990s ===
==== 1998 ====
1998 Australian federal election: Ballarat
Party	Candidate	Votes	%	±%
Liberal	Michael Ronaldson	34,527	45.23	−3.77
Labor	Marg Card	31,232	40.92	−0.98
One Nation	John Blanchard	3,738	4.90	+4.90
Democrats	Peta Price	2,824	3.70	−0.52
Shooters	John Wiley	1,569	2.06	+2.06
Greens	Malcolm Campbell	1,083	1.42	+1.42
Christian Democrats	Frank Colosimo	840	1.10	−1.24
Independent	Ian Harrison	188	0.25	+0.25
Unity	Margaret Taylor	182	0.24	+0.24
Independent	Alex Graham	147	0.19	+0.19
Total formal votes		76,330	96.45	−1.44
Informal votes		2,809	3.55	+1.44
Turnout		79,139	96.73	−0.09
Two-party-preferred result
Liberal	Michael Ronaldson	40,280	52.77	−0.90
Labor	Marg Card	36,050	47.23	+0.90
Liberal hold		Swing	−0.90	

==== 1996 ====
1996 Australian federal election: Ballarat
Party	Candidate	Votes	%	±%
Liberal	Michael Ronaldson	37,275	49.01	+1.89
Labor	Jenny Beacham	31,864	41.89	−1.77
Democrats	Trish Finlay	3,208	4.22	+1.93
Call to Australia	David Cocking	1,781	2.34	−1.26
Independent	Alan Gray	947	1.25	+1.25
Against Further Immigration	John Neenan	801	1.05	+1.05
Natural Law	Alan McDonald	186	0.24	−0.81
Total formal votes		76,062	97.89	+0.17
Informal votes		1,641	2.11	−0.17
Turnout		77,703	96.82	−0.30
Two-party-preferred result
Liberal	Michael Ronaldson	40,696	53.67	+2.09
Labor	Jenny Beacham	35,129	46.33	−2.09
Liberal hold		Swing	+2.09	

==== 1993 ====
1993 Australian federal election: Ballarat
Party	Candidate	Votes	%	±%
Liberal	Michael Ronaldson	33,478	47.47	+1.20
Labor	Peter Devereux	30,470	43.20	+2.36
Call to Australia	Jodie Rickard	2,618	3.71	+0.29
Independent	Geoffrey Hardy	1,703	2.41	+2.41
Democrats	Rob de Caen	1,516	2.15	−6.21
Natural Law	Veronica Caven	740	1.05	+1.05
Total formal votes		70,525	97.76	−0.01
Informal votes		1,614	2.24	+0.01
Turnout		72,139	97.11	
Two-party-preferred result
Liberal	Michael Ronaldson	36,787	52.20	+0.32
Labor	Peter Devereux	33,687	47.80	−0.32
Liberal hold		Swing	+0.32	

==== 1990 ====
1990 Australian federal election: Ballarat
Party	Candidate	Votes	%	±%
Liberal	Michael Ronaldson	31,273	46.3	+10.5
Labor	John Mildren	27,609	40.8	−6.5
Democrats	Bill Scetrine	5,654	8.4	+4.4
Call to Australia	Jodie Rickard	2,311	3.4	+3.4
Independent	Greg Mays	536	0.8	+0.8
Independent	George Helon	212	0.3	+0.3
Total formal votes		67,595	97.8	
Informal votes		1,541	2.2	
Turnout		69,136	96.9	
Two-party-preferred result
Liberal	Michael Ronaldson	35,043	51.9	+4.0
Labor	John Mildren	32,506	48.1	−4.0
Liberal gain from Labor		Swing	+4.0	

=== Elections in the 1980s ===
==== 1987 ====
1987 Australian federal election: Ballarat
Party	Candidate	Votes	%	±%
Labor	John Mildren	31,447	47.1	−2.3
Liberal	John Ronan	24,059	36.0	−8.4
National	John Boland	8,250	12.3	+10.8
Democrats	Phil Henseleit	2,685	4.0	+0.6
Independent	Martin Greany	392	0.6	+0.6
Total formal votes		66,833	96.4	
Informal votes		2,460	3.6	
Turnout		69,293	96.5	
Two-party-preferred result
Labor	John Mildren	34,674	51.9	−0.1
Liberal	John Ronan	32,147	48.1	+0.1
Labor hold		Swing	−0.1	

==== 1984 ====
1984 Australian federal election: Ballarat
Party	Candidate	Votes	%	±%
Labor	John Mildren	31,119	49.4	+1.5
Liberal	John Ronan	27,952	44.4	−2.5
Democrats	Graham Gough	2,163	3.4	+0.3
National	Douglas Stewart	961	1.5	+1.5
Democratic Labor	John Ferwerda	737	1.2	+1.2
Total formal votes		62,932	93.8	
Informal votes		4,148	6.2	
Turnout		67,080	96.4	
Two-party-preferred result
Labor	John Mildren	32,411	51.5	+0.2
Liberal	John Ronan	30,505	48.5	−0.2
Labor hold		Swing	+0.2	

==== 1983 ====
1983 Australian federal election: Ballarat
Party	Candidate	Votes	%	±%
Labor	John Mildren	34,616	50.7	+5.5
Liberal	John Ronan	30,078	44.1	−1.9
Democrats	Graham Gough	2,123	3.1	−2.5
Independent	John Blower	1,148	1.7	+1.7
Independent	Albert Ireland	275	0.4	+0.4
Total formal votes		68,240	98.3	
Informal votes		1,156	1.7	
Turnout		69,396	96.9	
Two-party-preferred result
Labor	John Mildren		54.1	+3.4
Liberal	John Ronan		45.9	−3.4
Labor hold		Swing	+3.4	

==== 1980 ====
1980 Australian federal election: Ballarat
Party	Candidate	Votes	%	±%
Liberal	Jim Short	30,551	46.0	−2.0
Labor	John Mildren	29,990	45.2	+8.2
Democrats	Graham Gough	3,736	5.6	−4.3
Democratic Labor	John Cotter	2,099	3.2	−1.8
Total formal votes		66,376	98.9	
Informal votes		1,239	1.8	
Turnout		67,615	96.7	
Two-party-preferred result
Labor	John Mildren	33,623	50.7	+8.2
Liberal	Jim Short	32,753	49.3	−8.2
Labor gain from Liberal		Swing	+8.2	

=== Elections in the 1970s ===
==== 1977 ====
1977 Australian federal election: Ballarat
Party	Candidate	Votes	%	±%
Liberal	Jim Short	30,480	48.0	−1.5
Labor	Norman Baker	23,487	37.0	−3.5
Democrats	Graham Gough	6,298	9.9	+9.9
Democratic Labor	William Griffin	3,202	5.0	−2.2
Total formal votes		63,467	98.0	
Informal votes		1,318	2.0	
Turnout		64,785	96.9	
Two-party-preferred result
Liberal	Jim Short		57.5	+0.0
Labor	Norman Baker		42.5	−0.0
Liberal hold		Swing	+0.0	

==== 1975 ====
1975 Australian federal election: Ballaarat
Party	Candidate	Votes	%	±%
Liberal	Jim Short	29,708	50.9	+5.0
Labor	David Williams	22,844	39.1	−4.6
Democratic Labor	Bryan Hanrahan	4,219	7.2	−0.3
Independent	Glendon Ludbrook	1,625	2.8	+2.8
Total formal votes		58,396	98.3	
Informal votes		1,011	1.7	
Turnout		59,407	97.0	
Two-party-preferred result
Liberal	Jim Short		58.9	+4.1
Labor	David Williams		41.1	−4.1
Liberal hold		Swing	+4.1	

==== 1974 ====
1974 Australian federal election: Ballaarat
Party	Candidate	Votes	%	±%
Liberal	Dudley Erwin	25,736	45.9	+4.1
Labor	David Williams	24,517	43.7	−1.9
Democratic Labor	Bryan Hanrahan	4,225	7.5	−5.1
Australia	Pamela Clifford	1,574	2.8	+2.8
Total formal votes		56,052	98.1	
Informal votes		1,077	1.9	
Turnout		57,129	96.4	
Two-party-preferred result
Liberal	Dudley Erwin	30,721	54.8	+1.3
Labor	David Williams	25,331	45.2	−1.3
Liberal hold		Swing	+1.3	

==== 1972 ====
1972 Australian federal election: Ballaarat
Party	Candidate	Votes	%	±%
Labor	David Williams	22,800	45.6	+6.3
Liberal	Dudley Erwin	20,860	41.8	−2.2
Democratic Labor	Anthony Balkin	6,297	12.6	−1.0
Total formal votes		49,957	98.9	
Informal votes		577	1.1	
Turnout		50,534	96.7	
Two-party-preferred result
Liberal	Dudley Erwin	26,719	53.5	−5.5
Labor	David Williams	23,238	46.5	+5.5
Liberal hold		Swing	−5.5	

=== Elections in the 1960s ===
==== 1969 ====
1969 Australian federal election: Ballaarat
Party	Candidate	Votes	%	±%
Liberal	Dudley Erwin	20,881	44.0	−4.6
Labor	David Pollock	18,634	39.3	+3.6
Democratic Labor	Bob Joshua	6,444	13.6	−2.0
Independent	Graeme Bond	1,173	2.5	+2.5
Independent	David Swinnerton	215	0.5	+0.5
Independent	Hendrik Prins	92	0.2	+0.2
Total formal votes		47,439	96.4	
Informal votes		1,752	3.6	
Turnout		49,191	96.6	
Two-party-preferred result
Liberal	Dudley Erwin	27,999	59.0	−4.0
Labor	David Pollock	19,440	41.0	+4.0
Liberal hold		Swing	−4.0	

==== 1966 ====
1966 Australian federal election: Ballaarat
Party	Candidate	Votes	%	±%
Liberal	Dudley Erwin	21,288	49.4	+1.1
Labor	David Pollock	15,042	34.9	−1.9
Democratic Labor	Bob Joshua	6,729	15.6	+0.7
Total formal votes		43,059	97.9	
Informal votes		924	2.1	
Turnout		43,983	96.5	
Two-party-preferred result
Liberal	Dudley Erwin	27,491	63.8	+1.6
Labor	David Pollock	15,568	36.2	−1.6
Liberal hold		Swing	+1.6	

==== 1963 ====
1963 Australian federal election: Ballaarat
Party	Candidate	Votes	%	±%
Liberal	Dudley Erwin	20,764	48.3	+4.7
Labor	Alan Williams	15,846	36.8	−1.7
Democratic Labor	Bob Joshua	6,421	14.9	−3.0
Total formal votes		43,031	99.2	
Informal votes		350	0.8	
Turnout		43,381	97.2	
Two-party-preferred result
Liberal	Dudley Erwin	26,764	62.2	+2.3
Labor	Alan Williams	16,267	37.8	−2.3
Liberal hold		Swing	+2.3	

==== 1961 ====
1961 Australian federal election: Ballaarat
Party	Candidate	Votes	%	±%
Liberal	Dudley Erwin	18,379	43.6	+3.7
Labor	Aubrey Keane	16,224	38.5	−4.3
Democratic Labor	Bob Joshua	7,557	17.9	+0.7
Total formal votes		42,160	98.6	
Informal votes		613	1.4	
Turnout		42,773	96.8	
Two-party-preferred result
Liberal	Dudley Erwin	25,240	59.9	+4.5
Labor	Aubrey Keane	16,920	40.1	−4.5
Liberal hold		Swing	+4.5	

=== Elections in the 1950s ===
==== 1958 ====
1958 Australian federal election: Ballaarat
Party	Candidate	Votes	%	±%
Labor	Donald Drummond	17,903	42.8	+4.7
Liberal	Dudley Erwin	16,683	39.9	+1.6
Democratic Labor	Bob Joshua	7,204	17.2	−6.5
Total formal votes		41,760	98.6	
Informal votes		610	1.4	
Turnout		42,400	97.1	
Two-party-preferred result
Liberal	Dudley Erwin	23,167	55.4	−2.5
Labor	Donald Drummond	18,623	44.6	+2.5
Liberal hold		Swing	−2.5	

==== 1955 ====
1955 Australian federal election: Ballaarat
Party	Candidate	Votes	%	±%
Liberal	Dudley Erwin	15,763	38.3	−9.1
Labor	Austin Dowling	15,686	38.1	−14.7
Labor (A-C)	Bob Joshua	9,757	23.7	+23.7
Total formal votes		41,206	98.4	
Informal votes		682	1.6	
Turnout		41,888	96.6	
Two-party-preferred result
Liberal	Dudley Erwin	23,852	57.9	+10.7
Labor	Austin Dowling	17,354	42.1	−10.7
Liberal gain from Labor		Swing	+10.7	

==== 1954 ====
1954 Australian federal election: Ballaarat
Party	Candidate	Votes	%	±%
Labor	Bob Joshua	20,997	52.6	+1.4
Liberal	Allen Driscoll	18,900	47.4	−1.4
Total formal votes		39,897	99.3	
Informal votes		291	0.7	
Turnout		40,188	97.3	
Labor hold		Swing	+1.4	

==== 1951 ====
1951 Australian federal election: Ballaarat
Party	Candidate	Votes	%	±%
Labor	Bob Joshua	20,482	51.2	+1.6
Liberal	Alan Pittard	19,517	48.8	−1.6
Total formal votes		39,999	99.1	
Informal votes		356	0.9	
Turnout		40,355	97.2	
Labor gain from Liberal		Swing	+1.6	

=== Elections in the 1940s ===
==== 1949 ====
1949 Australian federal election: Ballaarat
Party	Candidate	Votes	%	±%
Liberal	Alan Pittard	19,851	50.4	+3.1
Labor	Raymond Hyatt	19,522	49.6	−3.1
Total formal votes		39,373	99.0	
Informal votes		380	1.0	
Turnout		39,753	97.3	
Liberal gain from Labor		Swing	+3.1	

==== 1946 ====
1946 Australian federal election: Ballaarat
Party	Candidate	Votes	%	±%
Labor	Reg Pollard	25,827	53.1	−1.4
Liberal	Arnold Caddy	22,812	46.9	+6.2
Total formal votes		48,639	98.7	
Informal votes		617	1.3	
Turnout		49,256	95.7	
Labor hold		Swing	−4.8	

==== 1943 ====
1943 Australian federal election: Ballaarat
Party	Candidate	Votes	%	±%
Labor	Reg Pollard	26,428	54.5	+6.7
United Australia	Bill Roff	19,750	40.7	+0.6
Christian Independent	Gordon Irish	2,333	4.8	+4.8
Total formal votes		48,511	99.0	
Informal votes		480	1.0	
Turnout		48,991	97.6	
Two-party-preferred result
Labor	Reg Pollard		57.9	+7.6
United Australia	Bill Roff		42.1	−7.6
Labor hold		Swing	+7.6	

==== 1940 ====
1940 Australian federal election: Ballaarat
Party	Candidate	Votes	%	±%
Labor	Reg Pollard	22,715	47.8	−2.8
United Australia	Edward Montgomery	19,089	40.1	−9.3
Independent	Alex Russell	5,749	12.1	+12.1
Total formal votes		47,553	99.0	
Informal votes		488	1.0	
Turnout		48,041	96.8	
Two-party-preferred result
Labor	Reg Pollard	23,917	50.3	−0.3
United Australia	Edward Montgomery	23,636	49.7	+0.3
Labor hold		Swing	−0.3	

=== Elections in the 1930s ===
==== 1937 ====
1937 Australian federal election: Ballaarat
Party	Candidate	Votes	%	±%
Labor	Reg Pollard	24,784	50.6	+5.7
United Australia	Stanley Walker	24,186	49.4	+16.1
Total formal votes		48,970	99.1	
Informal votes		467	0.9	
Turnout		49,437	97.1	
Labor gain from United Australia		Swing	+3.5	

==== 1934 ====
1934 Australian federal election: Ballaarat
Party	Candidate	Votes	%	±%
Labor	William McAdam	17,725	43.9	+9.8
United Australia	Archibald Fisken	11,856	29.4	−19.6
Ind. United Australia	Fred Edmunds	10,752	26.7	+26.7
Total formal votes		40,333	98.4	
Informal votes		658	1.6	
Turnout		40,991	97.2	
Two-party-preferred result
United Australia	Archibald Fisken	21,746	53.9	−9.4
Labor	William McAdam	18,587	46.1	+9.4
United Australia hold		Swing	−9.4	

==== 1931 ====
1931 Australian federal election: Ballaarat
Party	Candidate	Votes	%	±%
United Australia	Charles McGrath	19,260	49.0	+6.4
Labor	Stewart Miller	13,409	34.1	−23.3
Country	Henry Bromfield	6,608	16.8	+16.8
Total formal votes		39,277	98.7	
Informal votes		505	1.3	
Turnout		39,782	97.6	
Two-party-preferred result
United Australia	Charles McGrath	24,859	63.3	+20.7
Labor	Stewart Miller	14,418	36.7	−20.7
United Australia gain from Labor		Swing	+20.7	

=== Elections in the 1920s ===
==== 1929 ====
1929 Australian federal election: Ballaarat
Party	Candidate	Votes	%	±%
Labor	Charles McGrath	21,760	57.4	+4.8
Nationalist	Fred Edmunds	16,129	42.6	−4.8
Total formal votes		37,889	99.2	
Informal votes		337	0.8	
Turnout		38,226	97.5	
Labor hold		Swing	+4.8	

==== 1928 ====
1928 Australian federal election: Ballaarat
Party	Candidate	Votes	%	±%
Labor	Charles McGrath	19,528	52.6	+1.3
Nationalist	Matthew Baird	17,616	47.4	−1.3
Total formal votes		37,144	98.2	
Informal votes		682	1.8	
Turnout		37,826	97.1	
Labor hold		Swing	+1.3	

==== 1925 ====
1925 Australian federal election: Ballaarat
Party	Candidate	Votes	%	±%
Labor	Charles McGrath	19,121	51.3	+0.9
Nationalist	Thomas Ryan	18,147	48.7	+12.9
Total formal votes		37,268	99.1	
Informal votes		341	0.9	
Turnout		37,609	95.2	
Labor hold		Swing	−0.4	

==== 1922 ====
1922 Australian federal election: Ballaarat
Party	Candidate	Votes	%	±%
Labor	Charles McGrath	14,200	50.4	+1.7
Nationalist	Russell Coldham	10,098	35.8	−14.8
Liberal	Sydney King	3,878	13.8	+13.8
Total formal votes		28,176	97.7	
Informal votes		657	2.3	
Turnout		28,833	72.7	
Two-party-preferred result
Labor	Charles McGrath		51.7	+2.6
Nationalist	Russell Coldham		48.3	−2.6
Labor hold		Swing	+2.6	

1920 Ballaarat by-election
Party	Candidate	Votes	%	±%
Labor	Charles McGrath	15,058	51.7	+1.7
Nationalist	Edwin Kerby	11,443	39.3	−10.7
Farmers	John Troup	2,413	8.3	+8.3
Independent	Edward Callow	186	0.6	+0.6
Total formal votes		29,100	99.3	
Informal votes		214	0.7	
Turnout		29,314	76.7	
Two-party-preferred result
Labor	Charles McGrath		56.1	+6.1
Nationalist	Edwin Kerby		45.9	−6.1
Labor gain from Nationalist		Swing	+6.1	

=== Elections in the 1910s ===
==== 1919 ====
1919 Australian federal election: Ballaarat
Party	Candidate	Votes	%	±%
Nationalist	Edwin Kerby	13,569	50.0	+50.0
Labor	Charles McGrath	13,568	50.0	−50.0
Total formal votes		27,137	99.3	
Informal votes		202	0.7	
Turnout		27,339	82.5	
Nationalist gain from Labor		Swing	+50.0	

==== 1917 ====
1917 Australian federal election: Ballaarat
Party	Candidate	Votes	%	±%
Labor	Charles McGrath	unopposed		
Labor hold		Swing		

==== 1914 ====
1914 Australian federal election: Ballaarat
Party	Candidate	Votes	%	±%
Labor	Charles McGrath	16,734	51.2	+0.6
Liberal	Russell Coldham	15,963	48.8	−0.6
Total formal votes		32,697	98.3	
Informal votes		566	1.7	
Turnout		33,263	87.3	
Labor hold		Swing	+0.6	

==== 1913 ====
1913 Australian federal election: Ballaarat
Party	Candidate	Votes	%	±%
Labor	Charles McGrath	16,417	50.6	+3.1
Liberal	Hugh McKay	16,049	49.4	−3.1
Total formal votes		32,466	98.9	
Informal votes		352	1.1	
Turnout		32,818	83.8	
Labor gain from Liberal		Swing	+3.1	

==== 1910 ====
1910 Australian federal election: Ballaarat
Party	Candidate	Votes	%	±%
Liberal	Alfred Deakin	10,179	51.1	−15.1
Labour	David Russell	9,736	48.9	+15.1
Total formal votes		19,915	98.6	
Informal votes		281	1.4	
Turnout		20,196	74.9	
Liberal hold		Swing	−15.1	

=== Elections in the 1900s ===
==== 1906 ====
1906 Australian federal election: Ballaarat
Party	Candidate	Votes	%	±%
Protectionist	Alfred Deakin	12,331	66.2	−33.8
Labour	James Scullin	6,305	33.8	+33.8
Total formal votes		18,636	97.8	
Informal votes		412	2.2	
Turnout		19,048	62.5	
Protectionist hold		Swing	−33.8	

==== 1903 ====
1903 Australian federal election: Ballaarat
Party	Candidate	Votes	%	±%
Protectionist	Alfred Deakin	unopposed		
Protectionist hold		Swing		

==== 1901 ====
1901 Australian federal election: Ballaarat
Party	Candidate	Votes	%	±%
Protectionist	Alfred Deakin	4,655	74.5	+74.5
Ind. Protectionist	Richard Vale	1,594	25.5	+25.5
Total formal votes		6,249	95.4	
Informal votes		29	4.6	
Turnout		6,278	47.6	
Protectionist win		(new seat)		
