= Catherine King (politician) =

Australian politician (born 1966)

The Honourable Catherine King MP
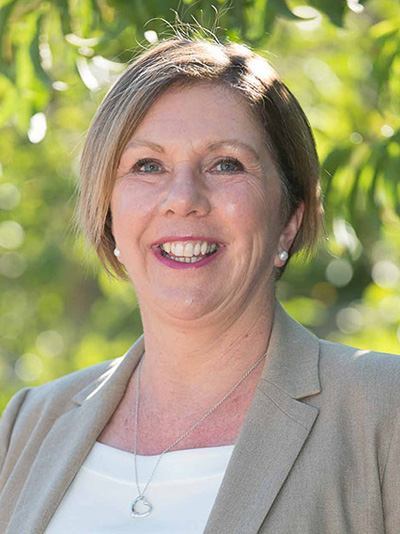
- Official portrait, 2022

Minister for Infrastructure, Transport, Regional Development and Local Government
- Incumbent
- Assumed office 1 June 2022
- Prime Minister: Anthony Albanese
- Preceded by: Barnaby Joyce

Minister for Regional Australia, Local Government and Territories
- In office 1 July 2013 – 18 September 2013
- Prime Minister: Kevin Rudd
- Preceded by: Anthony Albanese
- Succeeded by: Warren Truss

Minister for Regional Services, Local Communities and Territories Minister for Road Safety
- In office 25 March 2013 – 1 July 2013
- Prime Minister: Julia Gillard
- Preceded by: Jim Lloyd
- Succeeded by: Sharon Bird

Member of the Australian Parliament for Ballarat
- Incumbent
- Assumed office 10 November 2001
- Preceded by: Michael Ronaldson

Personal details
- Born: 2 June 1966 (age 60) Melbourne, Victoria, Australia
- Party: Labor
- Spouse: Mark Karlovic
- Children: 1
- Education: Australian National University, Phillip Institute of Technology
- Website: www.catherineking.com.au

Catherine Fiona King (born 2 June 1966) is an Australian politician serving as the Minister for Infrastructure, Transport, Regional Development and Local Government since 2022 and as the Member of Parliament (MP) for Ballarat since 2001. She is a member of the Australian Labor Party (ALP) and has served in the Shadow Cabinets of Mark Latham, Kim Beazley and Bill Shorten, before briefly serving as a minister in the Gillard and Rudd governments in 2013.

== Early life ==
King was born in Melbourne on 2 June 1966. She attended primary school in Burwood East and Glen Waverley, before completing her secondary education at Emmaus College.

King completed the degrees of Bachelor of Social Work at the Phillip Institute of Technology and Master of Public Policy at the Australian National University. She later completed a Bachelor of Laws at Deakin University in 2018, and was admitted as a lawyer in Victoria in 2021.

== Professional career ==
King worked as a social worker at Ballarat Children's Homes and Family Services from 1988 to 1992, and in 1991 was named Victorian Young Achiever of the Year in the field of community services. In the same year she spent six months working in Birmingham, England, which influenced her later decision to enter politics. King subsequently joined the Australian Public Service, working as an industry policy officer for the Australia New Zealand Food Authority (1993–1994) and as a senior officer in the Department of Health and Aged Care (1997–1999). She served as assistant director of the department's population health division and later as director of injury prevention. While in the public service she lived in Canberra, spending periods in Narrabundah, Hughes and Swinger Hill. King later moved back to Victoria and joined the private sector as a senior manager in KPMG's consulting division.

== Political Career ==
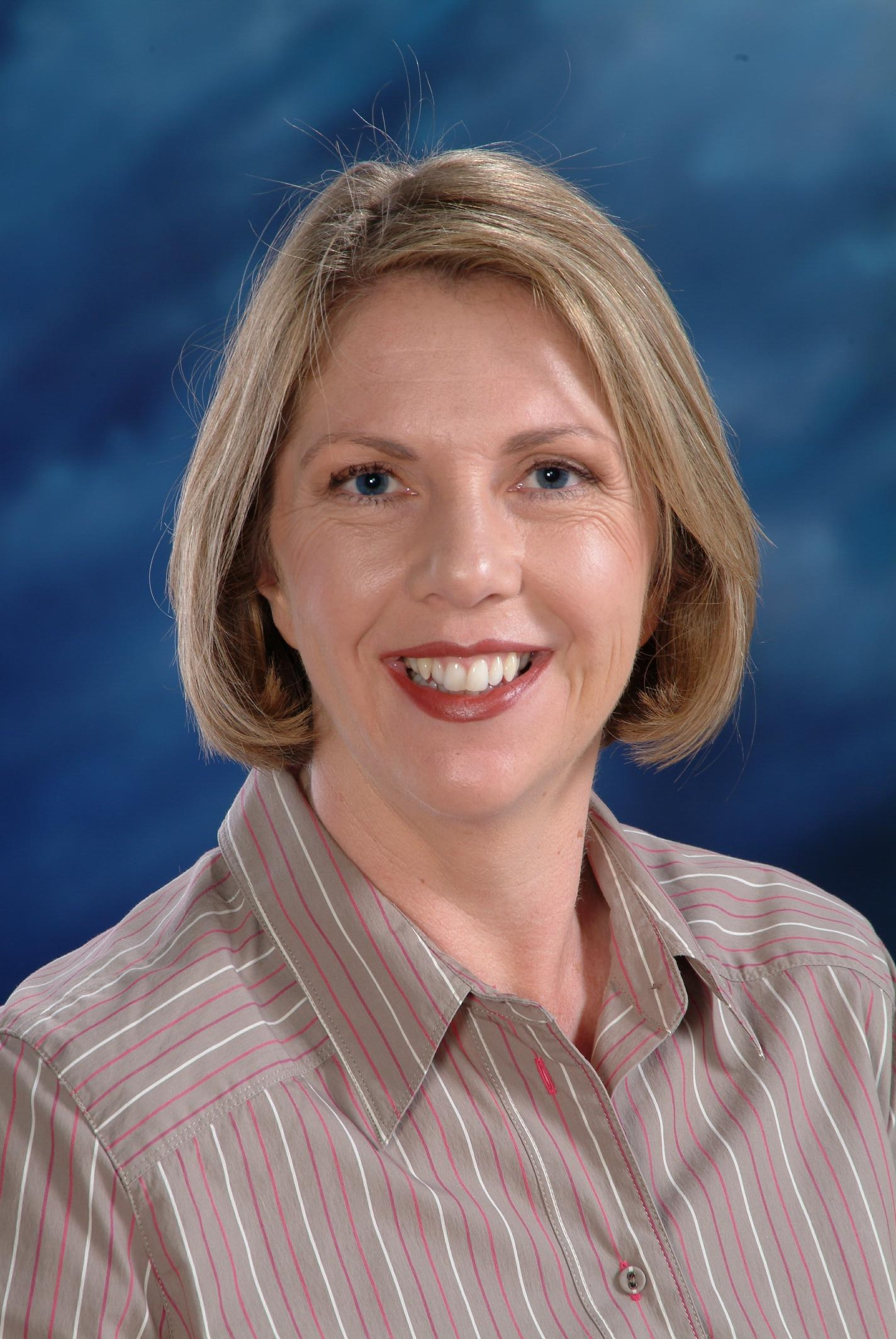
Official portrait, 2004

King joined the Australian Labor Party in 1993 and worked briefly as a research officer for Andrew Theophanous, the parliamentary secretary for health in the Keating government. She served as president of the party's Port Melbourne branch from 1998 to 1999. In 2000, she was selected to contest the seat of Ballarat for the Labor Party.

King is a member of the Labor Left.

=== Opposition (2001–2007) ===
King was the only Labor candidate to win a seat at the 2001 federal election from the Liberal Party of Australia, and secured a 5.5-point swing, to take the seat by a margin of 52.73% the largest swing to a Labor candidate in the poll. She was likely helped when the Liberals' initial candidate, Olympic gold medallist Russell Mark, resigned three months before the election, whereas King had 18 months to campaign. She joined the Joint Statutory Public Accounts and Audit Committee in 2002.

King was re-elected in the 2004 federal election with a slightly reduced majority and was then appointed the Shadow Parliamentary Secretary for Regional Development by then Labor Leader Mark Latham. In mid-2005 she was then promoted to Shadow Parliamentary Secretary for Treasury by Kim Beazley, and retained in the role by Kevin Rudd. King also served on the House of Representatives Standing Committee on Health and Ageing.

=== Government (2007–2013) ===
King was re-elected for a third term at the 2007 federal election, increasing her majority from 2.2 to 8.15 points. She was not included in the incoming Rudd Government and remained on the backbench, serving as Chair of the Infrastructure, Transport, Regional Development and Local Government Committee from 2008 until the lead up to the 2010 Election when she relinquished all committee roles In the 2010 federal election she increased her margin to 11.7 points.

King was appointed to serve in the Second Gillard Ministry and was sworn in by Governor-General Quentin Bryce on 14 September 2010 as the Parliamentary Secretary for Health and Ageing and the Parliamentary Secretary for Infrastructure and Transport. On 25 March 2013, King was appointed to the Ministry as the Minister for Regional Services, Local Communities and Territories and the Minister for Road Safety and was again sworn in by Governor General Quentin Bryce Following the June 2013 Labor leadership spill, she was appointed as the Minister for Regional Australia, Local Government and Territories in the Second Rudd Ministry and promoted into the Australian Cabinet.

=== Opposition (2013–2022) ===
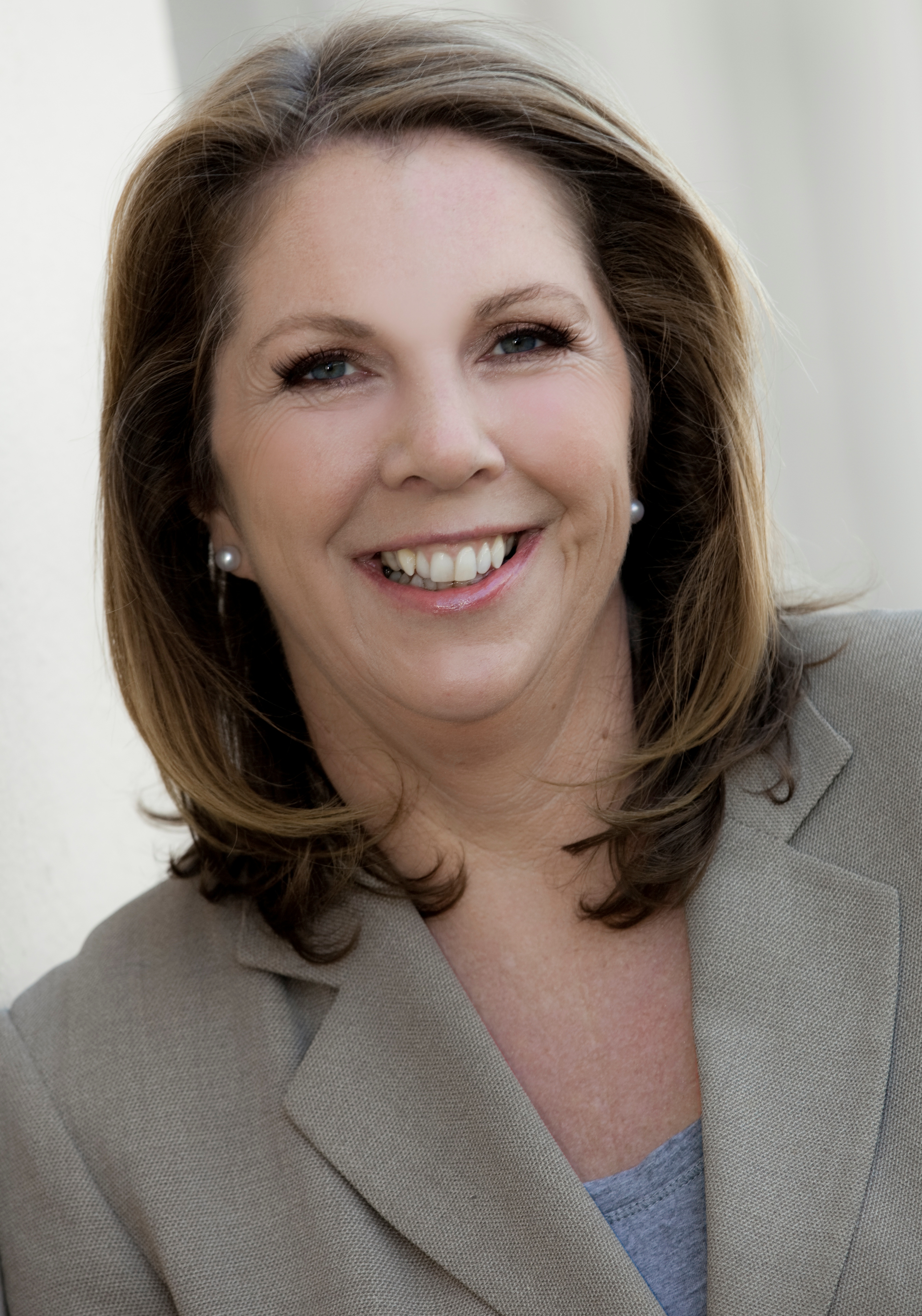
Official portrait, 2013

Despite the defeat of the second Rudd government in the 2013 federal election, King retained her seat with a margin of 4.9%. Following the election of Bill Shorten as Labor Leader, King was appointed to shadow cabinet as Shadow Minister for Health. In this role, King proposed to end the freeze on government Medicare rebates for Doctors, which had been introduced by the Rudd Government but extended by the Turnbull Government until 2020.

King was re-elected for a sixth time at the 2016 election, by a margin of 14.62% and retained her position in the Shadow Cabinet, as Shadow Minister for Health and Medicare Following the 2019 election, she was retained in Anthony Albanese's shadow ministry and given the portfolio of Shadow Minister for Infrastructure, Transport and Regional Development.

As Shadow Infrastructure Minister, King called for the Western Victoria Transmission Network Project proposed connection from Bulgana to western Melbourne to be rerouted, citing concerns over disruption to viable agricultural land, as well as local community opposition.

=== Government (since 2022) ===
King attending a climate forum during the 2022 election campaign.

Following the 2022 federal election, where King was re-elected on a margin of 62.97%, she was appointed Minister for Infrastructure, Transport, Regional Development and Local Government in the Albanese ministry.

In September 2024, King announced a new infrastructure funding framework between the States and Territories and the Commonwealth. The agreements will run until 2029, and include a provision between States and Territories to share data related to fatalities and trauma on roads. A shift from an 80:20 funding formula to a default 50:50 funding model between the States and Territories was eventually watered down from an explicit rule to a basis for future negotiations after opposition from a majority of state governments.

King was re-elected at the 2025 federal election with 60.7%, despite a 2.3% swing against her. She was reappointed to the her role following the 2025 Election.

As Transport Minister, King appointed an Independent Expert Panel in October 2026 to review the operations of Airservices Australia and implement safety recommendations after a 20% rise in near miss collisions between planes at Sydney Airport, blamed on Air Traffic Control shortages and rostering that lead to worker fatigue.

King declined to have projects related to the Australian Capital Territory independently audited after the ACT Integrity Commission found in August 2026 that ACT Government officials had engaged in serious corrupt conduct relating to an infrastructure project that was commissioned in 2019. She did not express full confidence that other projects in the territory would not have any other evidence of corruption.

King condemned the attack on Helen Haines and admitted that she had stopped using a caravan as a mobile office in her electorate due to safety concerns.

==== Qatar Airways decision ====
In August 2022 Qatar's civil aviation authority applied to double Qatar Airways' entitlement under Australia's bilateral air services agreement with Qatar, which limited the airline to 28 weekly services to Sydney, Melbourne, Brisbane and Perth. King's department consulted only Qantas and Virgin Australia on the request; Qantas opposed it, as its then chief executive Alan Joyce later confirmed to a Senate committee. King refused the application in July 2023, saying it was not in the national interest. Qatar Airways told the committee it learned of the refusal from media reports, and that the letter subsequently sent to it gave no reasons.

King gave a number of explanations over the following weeks, referring at different times to the recovery of aviation capacity after the COVID-19 pandemic, Australian jobs, and the invasive physical examinations of Australian women at Hamad International Airport in Doha in 2020, which she said "wasn't a factor in the decision, but it was certainly context for the decision". Michelle Grattan wrote that King had struggled to give a consistent account of her reasoning. The former Australian Competition and Consumer Commission (ACCC) chairs Allan Fels and Rod Sims criticised the decision, Fels calling it "a really bad decision by any standards" and "just looking after Qantas", and Sims saying that measures which reduced competition and maintained higher airfares required "really clear explanations". The ACCC chair, Gina Cass-Gottlieb, said additional Qatar services would have made airfares cheaper. King said she had not taken "the commercial interests of either Qantas or Virgin into consideration", and noted that the previous Coalition government had also declined to expand Qatar's access.

The Senate established a select committee on the decision, chaired by Bridget McKenzie, which reported on 9 October 2023. Its majority recommended that the government immediately review the refusal, finding that "the weight of evidence before the committee indicates the national interest would have been well served by agreeing to Qatar's request", and recommended that King be asked to give evidence. King did not appear before the committee, described the inquiry as a "ridiculous farce" and ruled out revisiting the decision; Labor senators dissented from the majority report.

The decision was made amid wider scrutiny of Qantas's relationships with federal politicians, including the airline's invitation-only Chairman's Lounge, to which all federal politicians are invited. In March 2025 the ACCC authorised an alliance under which Qatar Airways operates Australia–Doha services on Virgin Australia's behalf, adding up to 28 weekly return flights; the first service departed Sydney on 12 June 2025.

==== Grants controversy ====
After the 2025 Federal Election, King established the Major and Local Community Infrastructure Programme worth $560 Million. The scheme attracted controversy in September 2026 when it was revealed that 73% of allocated funds were to seats held by Labor, as well as grants for poorer electorates being below average. This includes the awarding of a $6 Million grant to Marrickville Golf Club, based in Grayndler, the seat of Prime Minister Anthony Albanese, which has led to separate allegations of a conflict of interest. King defended the scheme, stating that programme awarded grants based on value for money and has declined to answer questions to a Senate Committee investigating the matter.

Parliament of Australia
Preceded by Michael Ronaldson	Member for Ballarat; 2001–present	Incumbent
Political offices
Preceded by Simon Crean	Minister for Regional Services, Local Communities and Territories; 2013	Succeeded by Sharon Bird as Minister for Regional Development
New ministerial post	Minister for Road Safety; 2013	Succeeded by Sharon Bird
Preceded by Anthony Albanese as Minister for Regional Development and Local Government	Minister for Regional Australia, Local Government and Territories; 2013	Succeeded by Warren Truss as Minister for Infrastructure and Regional Development; Jamie Briggs as Assistant Minister for Infrastructure and Regional Development
Preceded by Barnaby Joyce	Minister for Infrastructure, Transport, Regional Development and Local Government; 2022–present	Incumbent
