= 1920 Ballaarat by-election =

- 10 July 1920

Division of Ballaarat in the House of Representatives
- Turnout: 76.7% (▼5.8)
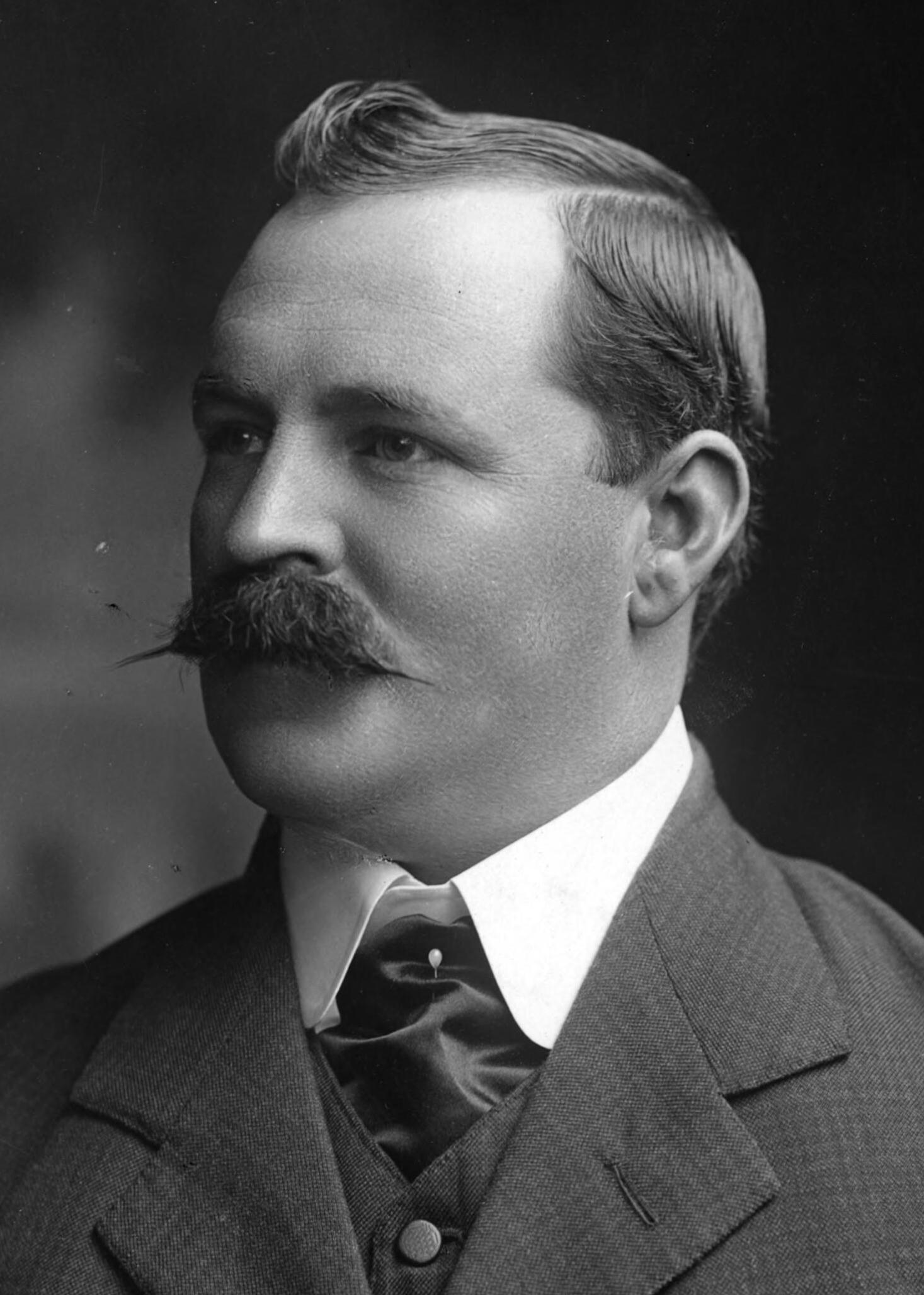

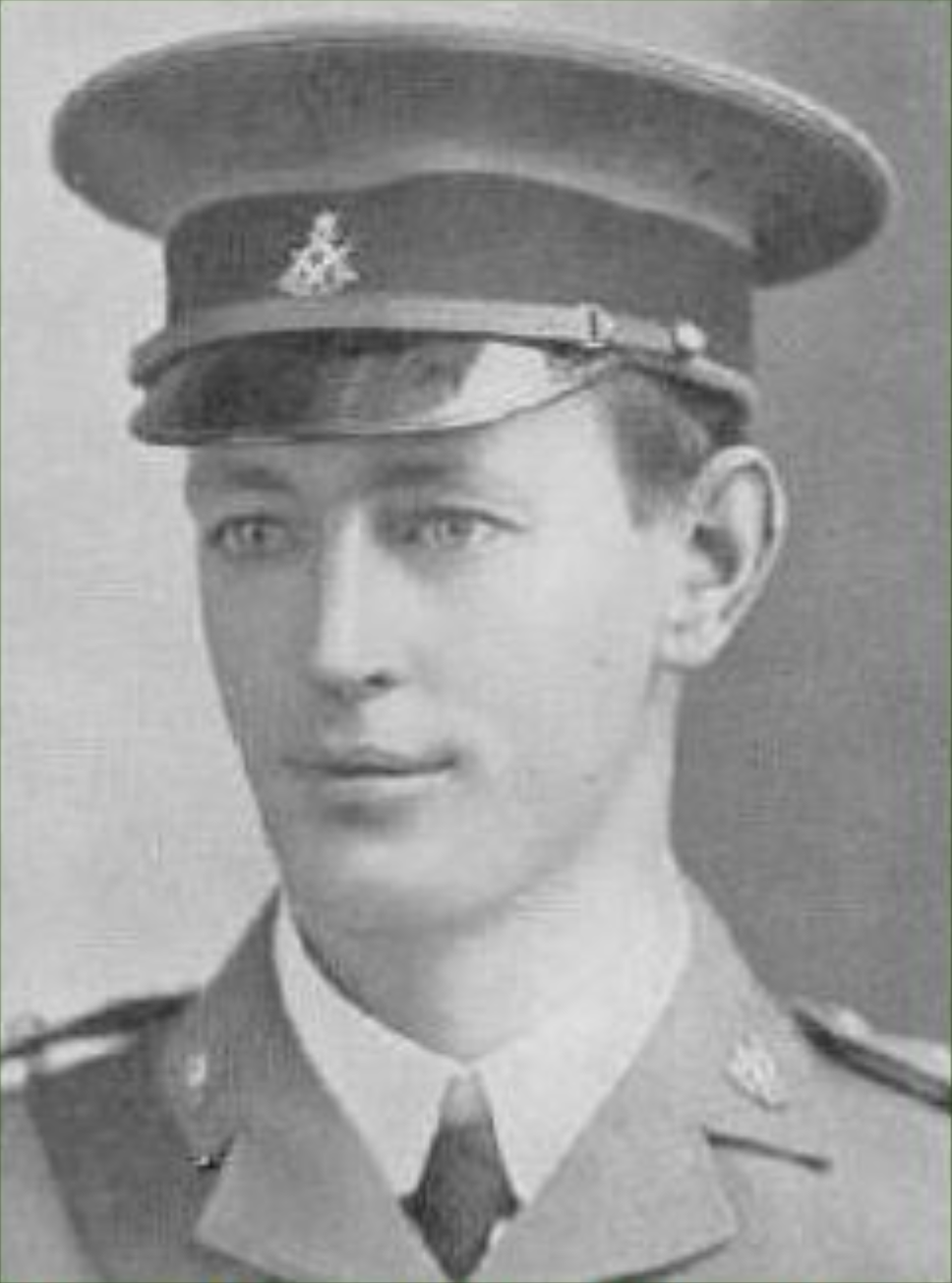
	First party	Second party
Candidate	Charles McGrath	Edwin Kerby
Party	Labor	Nationalist
Primary vote	15,058	11,443
Percentage	51.7%	39.3%
Swing	▲1.7pp	▼10.7
TPP	56.1%	43.9%
TPP swing	▲6.1	▼6.1
MP before election
Edwin Kerby
Nationalist
Elected MP
Charles McGrath
Labor

The 1920 Ballaarat by-election was held on 10 July 1920 to elect the member for Ballaarat in the Australian House of Representatives.

At the 1919 federal election, Nationalist candidate Edwin Kerby defeated the sitting Labor MP Charles McGrath by a single vote, the narrowest margin in Australian electoral history. McGrath challenged the result successfully on the grounds of electoral irregularities, triggering the by-election, at which McGrath was victorious.

== Results ==
1920 Ballaarat by-election
Party	Candidate	Votes	%	±%
Labor	Charles McGrath	15,058	51.7	+1.7
Nationalist	Edwin Kerby	11,443	39.3	−10.7
Farmers	John Troup	2,413	8.3	+8.3
Independent	Edward Callow	186	0.6	+0.6
Total formal votes		29,100	99.3	
Informal votes		214	0.7	
Turnout		29,314	76.7	−5.8
Two-party-preferred result
Labor	Charles McGrath		56.1	+6.1
Nationalist	Edwin Kerby		43.9	−6.1
Labor gain from Nationalist		Swing	+6.1	

== See also ==
- Electoral results for the Division of Ballaarat
