= Michael Ronaldson =

Australian politician (born 1954)

The Honourable Michael Ronaldson
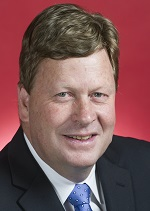

Minister for Veterans' Affairs
- In office 18 September 2013 – 21 September 2015
- Prime Minister: Tony Abbott; Malcolm Turnbull
- Preceded by: Warren Snowdon
- Succeeded by: Stuart Robert

Minister Assisting the Prime Minister for the Centenary of ANZAC
- In office 18 September 2013 – 21 September 2015
- Prime Minister: Tony Abbott; Malcolm Turnbull
- Preceded by: Warren Snowdon
- Succeeded by: Stuart Robert

Special Minister of State
- In office 18 September 2013 – 21 September 2015
- Prime Minister: Tony Abbott
- Preceded by: Mark Dreyfus
- Succeeded by: Mal Brough

Senator from Victoria
- In office 1 July 2005 – 28 February 2016
- Preceded by: Tsebin Tchen
- Succeeded by: James Paterson

Member of the Australian Parliament for Ballarat
- In office 24 March 1990 – 8 October 2001
- Preceded by: John Mildren
- Succeeded by: Catherine King

Personal details
- Born: 13 February 1954 (age 72) Ballarat, Victoria, Australia
- Party: Liberal Party
- Spouse: Cate Ronaldson (m. 1983)
- Relations: Archibald Fisken (grandfather)
- Children: 3
- Education: University of Melbourne
- Profession: Barrister

Michael John Clyde Ronaldson (born 13 February 1954) is a former Australian politician. He was a Senator for the state of Victoria representing the Liberal Party from July 2005 until February 2016, and previously served in the House of Representatives for Ballarat from 1990 to 2001. Ronaldson served as the Minister for Veterans' Affairs, the Minister Assisting the Prime Minister for the Centenary of ANZAC, and the Special Minister of State in the Abbott government from 2013 to 2015.

== Background and early career ==
Ronaldson was born in Ballarat, Victoria and attended Ballarat College before studying law at the University of Melbourne. Admitted to the Bar, Ronaldson practised as a barrister and solicitor in Ballarat before entering politics. In 1981, Ronaldson was elected to the Ballarat City Council, where he served two terms as a councillor.

== Political career ==
A member of the Liberal Party since 1980, Ronaldson was elected to the House of Representatives for the seat of Ballarat in 1990.

His election, along with several other Victorian MHRs first elected in March 1990, was largely a result of a protest vote swing against the Labor (John Cain) state government of the time. At his election, he held the seat with a margin of 1.9%.

His grandfather, Archibald Fisken, was the member for Ballarat from 1934 until 1937. During his time in the House of Representatives, Ronaldson served as the Shadow Minister for Youth, Sport and Recreation, Shadow Parliamentary Secretary to the Leader of the Opposition and Shadow Minister for Schools, Vocational Education and Training.

Following the election of the Howard government at the 1996 federal election, Ronaldson was appointed a Parliamentary Secretary to the Minister for Transport and Regional Development. After the 1998 election he was appointed Chief Government Whip.

Following his retirement from the House of Representatives at the 2001 election, Ronaldson was a consultant and member of a number of boards including Snowy Hydro Limited. He was co-chair of the Australian Ex-Prisoners of War Memorial project in Ballarat where he assisted with fundraising. He served on the Administrative Committee of the Liberal Party of Australia (Victorian Division) from 2001 to 2004. Ronaldson has been a member of the Liberal Party for more than 30 years.

=== Senator for Victoria ===
At the 2004 federal election Ronaldson was elected to the Senate representing the state of Victoria, and his term began on 1 July 2005. Following the 2007 election, Ronaldson was appointed Shadow Special Minister of State under Brendan Nelson. He served as Shadow Cabinet Secretary in September 2008 until December 2009.

After the 2010 federal election Ronaldson was appointed Shadow Minister for Veterans' Affairs and Shadow Minister Assisting the Leader of the Opposition on the Centenary of ANZAC.

He assumed the portfolios as Minister for Veterans' Affairs, Minister Assisting the Prime Minister for the Centenary of ANZAC and Special Minister of State on 18 September 2013, but was replaced in the First Turnbull Ministry when Malcolm Turnbull replaced Tony Abbott as prime minister.

He announced on 18 December 2015 his intention to leave parliament before the next election, after moving from the outer ministry in the Abbott government to the backbench in the Turnbull government. He said he would formally resign from parliament once his Liberal replacement was selected. His resignation became effective on 28 February 2016, creating a casual vacancy which was filled on 9 March 2016 when James Paterson was appointed by a joint sitting of the Parliament of Victoria.

== After politics ==
Ronaldson was appointed to the board of Australia Post in May 2016. He was board member of the Oliver Foundation from 2018, Director of the State Sports Centre Trust (Victoria) from 2020 to 2021, and chairman of the board at InnoWell Pty Ltd.

== Personal life ==
Ronaldson has been married to Cate Ronaldson since 1983, and has three children.

He survived a bout with kidney cancer in 1996.

Parliament of Australia
Preceded by John Mildren	Member for Ballarat; 1990–2001	Succeeded by Catherine King
Preceded by Tsebin Tchen	Senator for Victoria; 2005–2016	Succeeded by James Paterson
Political offices
Preceded by Warren Snowdon	Minister for Veterans' Affairs; 2013–2015	Succeeded by Stuart Robert
Preceded by Warren Snowdon	Minister Assisting the Prime Minister for the Centenary of ANZAC; 2013–2015	Succeeded by Stuart Robert
Preceded by Mark Dreyfus	Special Minister of State; 2013–2015	Succeeded by Mal Brough
