= Bob Joshua =

Australian politician (1906–1970)

Bob Joshua MC
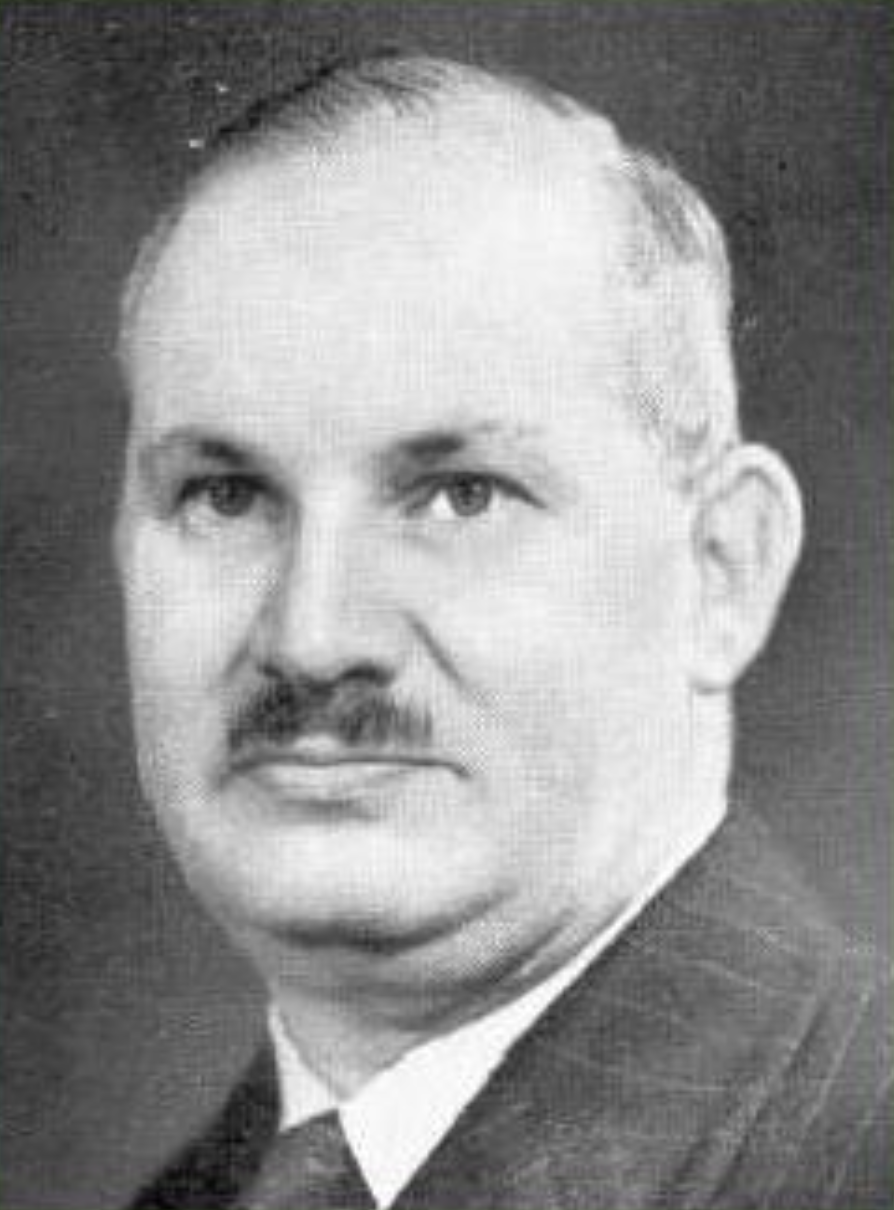

Leader of the Democratic Labor Party
- In office 7 April 1955 – 8 May 1956
- Preceded by: party established
- Succeeded by: George Cole

Member of the Australian Parliament for Ballaarat
- In office 28 April 1951 – 10 December 1955
- Preceded by: Alan Pittard
- Succeeded by: Dudley Erwin

Personal details
- Born: 6 June 1906 Prahran, Victoria, Australia
- Died: 2 June 1970 (aged 63) Ballarat, Victoria, Australia
- Party: Labor (1951–55); Labor (A-C) (1955)
- Spouse(s): Alma Agnes Watson (m. 1929); 6 children
- Occupation: Motor mechanic, soldier

Military service
- Allegiance: Australia
- Branch/service: Citizens Military Force; Second Australian Imperial Force
- Years of service: 1924–1930; 1936–1946
- Rank: Lieutenant Colonel
- Commands: 2/43rd Battalion (1943–44)
- Battles/wars: Second World War; North African campaign; Siege of Tobruk; New Guinea campaign; Salamaua–Lae campaign; Battle of Finschhafen
- Awards: Military Cross

Robert Joshua, MC (6 June 1906 – 2 June 1970) was an Australian politician, and a key figure in the 1955 split in the Australian Labor Party which led to the formation of the Australian Labor Party (Anti-Communist) and, subsequently, the Democratic Labor Party.

== Early life ==
Joshua was born on 6 June 1906 in Prahran, Victoria. He was the son of Mary Inglis (née Drummond) and Edward Cecil Joshua. His father was born in Mauritius, where there was a branch of the family's Melbourne-based Joshua Brothers Distillery. He is a descendent of Samuel Moss Solomon and financier Joseph Barrow Montefiore.

Joshua attended Caulfield State School and Wesley College, was briefly a motor mechanic, and became a teller at the Bank of Australasia. He married schoolteacher Alma Agnes Watson at Glen Iris on 27 November 1929.

== Military service ==
Joshua served in the Citizens Military Force from 1924 to 1930 and from 1936 to 1940, rising to the rank of captain. Subsequently, he joined the Australian Imperial Force in 1940 and was posted to the Middle East. He led a successful raid during the defence of Tobruk in Libya, and was awarded the Military Cross. Promoted from major to lieutenant colonel in 1942, he commanded the 2/43rd Battalion, which fought around Lae and Finschafen in New Guinea. He was twice wounded in action.

== Federal politics ==
Upon returning to civilian life, Joshua began to reshape his previously conservative political views. He became drawn to the Australian Labor Party, and became president of the Ballarat branch. In 1951, he was elected to the Australian House of Representatives for the seat of Ballaarat. He was known as a fierce anti-communist.

In 1955, Joshua, together with six other federal parliamentarians, was expelled from the Labor Party. Together, they formed the Australian Labor Party (Anti-Communist), later the Democratic Labor Party. Joshua cited his "distrust" and "sympathy with Communist ideas" of Labor leader H.V. Evatt as reasons for his disenchantment with the ALP. Joshua became the leader of the new party in the federal parliament. He would also become the first federal president of the DLP.

He was one of only two non-Catholic parliamentary members in the new party, the other being Jack Little, who became leader of the party in the Victorian Legislative Council. Joshua's religious affiliation had been described at school as being "theist", although his background and views were described as "resist[ing] easy classification"; he eventually became an Anglican. He denied any connection with B. A. Santamaria.

Together with all of the other Anti-Communist members, Joshua was defeated at the 1955 election, having declined an offer from Prime Minister Robert Menzies not to run a Liberal candidate in his seat. Following his defeat, he became an accountant and stockbroker at Ballarat and continued to contest Ballarat as a DLP candidate until 1969.

== Death ==
Joshua died of cancer on 2 June 1970 at Ballarat, four days before his 64th birthday, survived by his wife, son and five daughters. He had continued working until a few days before his death, when he notified his doctors: "I'm dying – what are you going to do about it?"

Parliament of Australia
Preceded by Alan Pittard	Member for Ballaarat; 1951–1955	Succeeded by Dudley Erwin
