= Dudley Erwin =

Australian politician

The Honourable Dudley Erwin
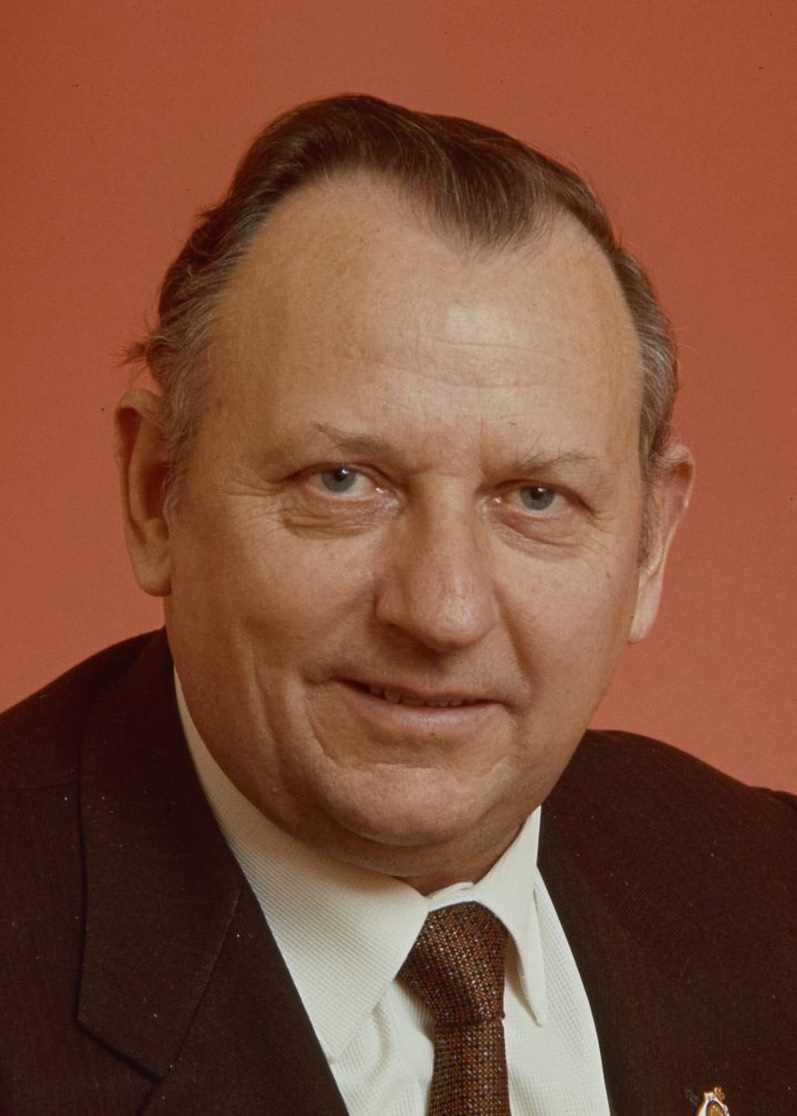
- Erwin in 1974

Minister for Air
- In office 13 February 1969 – 12 November 1969
- Prime Minister: John Gorton
- Preceded by: Gordon Freeth
- Succeeded by: Tom Drake-Brockman

Leader of the House
- In office 13 February 1969 – 12 November 1969
- Leader: John Gorton
- Preceded by: Billy Snedden
- Succeeded by: Billy Snedden

Member of the Australian Parliament for Ballaarat
- In office 10 December 1955 – 11 November 1975
- Preceded by: Bob Joshua
- Succeeded by: Jim Short

Personal details
- Born: 20 August 1917 Winchelsea, Victoria, Australia
- Died: 29 October 1984 (aged 67) Canberra, Australia
- Party: Liberal
- Spouses: Alma Cleburne (m. 1944; div. 1957) Virginia Burrows (m. 1962, divorced) Gwenda Potter (m. 1977)

George Dudley Erwin (20 August 1917 – 29 October 1984) was an Australian politician who served in the House of Representatives from 1955 to 1975, representing the Liberal Party. He was Chief Government Whip from 1967 to 1969, and played a role in the ascension of John Gorton to the prime ministership after the disappearance of Harold Holt. He was briefly Minister for Air in 1969, but a falling-out with Gorton ended his ministerial career.

== Early life ==
Erwin was born in Winchelsea, Victoria, as the fifth of nine children born to Alfreda Mary Elizabeth (née Blake) and Herbert Edward Erwin. He grew up on his father's farming property near Wensleydale. He attended the local state school until the age of 13, leaving during the Great Depression to help on the farm. Erwin took a correspondence course in Morse code, later attending the Marconi School of Wireless in Sydney. He enlisted in the Royal Australian Air Force (RAAF) in January 1940, training as a radio operator. He finished the war with the rank of flight lieutenant, serving as a navigator with No. 25 Squadron and No. 31 Squadron. Erwin was discharged in October 1945 and bought a farm of 360 acres (150 ha) near that of his father. He also owned a successful hotel in Ballarat.

== Politics ==
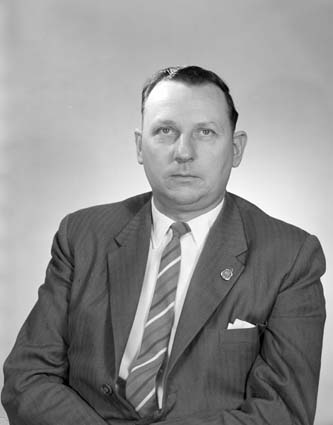
Erwin in 1961

Erwin was elected for the Liberal Party as the member of the House of Representatives seat of Ballaarat at the 1955 election. He was Government Whip from February 1967 to February 1969 and strongly supported John Gorton's election as Liberal leader following the disappearance and presumed drowning of Prime Minister Harold Holt on 17 December 1967. On 13 February 1969 he was appointed Minister for Air, in the reshuffle following Paul Hasluck's appointment as Governor-General. Gorton subsequently appointed one of his young staffers, Ainsley Gotto as his private secretary and came to rely on her for political advice. In November 1969, Erwin was left out of Gorton's second ministry. Erwin's explanation for his dismissal was:

It's shapely, it wiggles, it's cold blooded and its name is Ainsley Gotto."

Erwin chaired the Joint Select Committee on Parliamentary and Government Publications, which produced the first edition of the Australian Government Style Manual. He retired from parliament at the 1975 election. His final political candidacy occurred at the 1979 elections for the Australian Capital Territory House of Assembly, where he ran unsuccessfully as an independent.

== Personal life ==
On 8 January 1944, Erwin married Alma Betty Cleburne. The couple had a son and a daughter. However, in 1957 Erwin divorced his first wife on the grounds of desertion. He remarried to Virginia Joan Burrows (née Eagan), an American divorcee, in 1962. His second marriage also ended in divorce, and he married for a third time in 1977 to Gwendolyne Phyllis Potter (née Pennant). After leaving parliament, Erwin split his time between Canberra and Caloundra, Queensland, where he owned a block of units. He died of a heart attack in Canberra on 29 October 1984. He was survived by his daughter, youngest son, third wife, and stepson from his third marriage; his oldest son predeceased him.

== Notes ==
Political offices
Preceded by Gordon Freeth	Minister for Air; 1969	Succeeded by Tom Drake-Brockman
Parliament of Australia
Preceded by Bob Joshua	Member for Ballaarat; 1955 – 1975	Succeeded by Jim Short
