= John Mildren =

Australian politician (1932–2024)

John Mildren OAM

Member of the Australian Parliament for Ballarat
- In office 18 October 1980 – 24 March 1990
- Preceded by: Jim Short
- Succeeded by: Michael Ronaldson

Personal details
- Born: 20 October 1932 Colac, Victoria, Australia
- Died: 25 April 2024 (aged 91)
- Party: Australian Labor Party
- Education: University of Melbourne; Texas A&M University
- Occupation: Teacher, lecturer

John Barry Mildren OAM (20 October 1932 – 25 April 2024) was an Australian politician.

== Biography ==
Born in Colac, Victoria on 20 October 1932, Mildren attended the University of Melbourne and then Texas A&M University. He became a teacher, later rising to senior lecturer and head of department at Ballarat College of Advanced Education. In 1980, he was elected to the Australian House of Representatives as the Labor member for Ballarat, defeating Liberal MP Jim Short. He held the seat until his own defeat in 1990 by Michael Ronaldson.

Mildren was awarded the Medal of the Order of Australia (OAM) in the 2018 Australia Day Honours, "for service to the Parliament of Australia, and the community of Ballarat."

Mildren died on the night of 25 April 2024, at the age of 91.

Parliament of Australia
Preceded by Jim Short	Member for Ballarat; 1980–1990	Succeeded by Michael Ronaldson
