= Jim Short (politician) =

Australian politician

The Honourable Jim Short AM

Assistant Treasurer of Australia
- In office 11 March 1996 – 14 October 1996
- Prime Minister: John Howard
- Preceded by: George Gear
- Succeeded by: Rod Kemp

Senator for Victoria
- In office 1 December 1984 – 12 May 1997
- Succeeded by: Karen Synon

Member of the Australian Parliament for Ballarat
- In office 13 December 1975 – 18 October 1980
- Preceded by: Dudley Erwin
- Succeeded by: John Mildren

Personal details
- Born: 7 December 1936 (age 89) Shepparton, Victoria, Australia
- Party: Liberal
- Education: University of Melbourne
- Occupation: Public servant

James Robert Short (born 7 December 1936) is a former Australian public servant, politician and diplomat. He was an assistant secretary in the Department of the Treasury before winning election to the House of Representatives as a Liberal at the 1975 federal election. He was defeated in 1980 but transferred to the Senate in 1984, serving until 1997. He briefly served as Assistant Treasurer in the Howard government in 1996, and after leaving politics worked at the European Bank for Reconstruction and Development and as Australia's special envoy to Cyprus.

== Early life ==
Short was born on 7 December 1936 in Shepparton, Victoria. He was the youngest of three children born to Elsie (née Hearn) and George Short. His father was a public servant who initially worked as a surveyor but was seconded to the Manpower Directorate on the outbreak of World War II. The family moved to Wangaratta and then in 1946 moved to Bendigo where his father ran the local Commonwealth Employment Service office. Short was educated at Wangaratta Primary School, Gravel Hill State School and Bendigo High School, where he was the head prefect and captained the school's cricket and tennis teams.

== Public service career ==
After leaving high school Short took up a cadetship with the Commonwealth Public Service, studying part-time at the University of Melbourne while undergoing management training at the Postmaster-General's Department. He graduated Bachelor of Arts and Bachelor of Commerce in 1961, subsequently joining the Tariff Board. He moved to Canberra in 1962 and the following year transferred to the Department of the Treasury. In 1964 Short became private secretary to the Treasurer, serving under Harold Holt (1964–1966) and William McMahon (1966). He then spent three years as a Treasury representative in London before returning to Australia and becoming assistant secretary of the overseas economic relations division. He was later seconded to the Australian Industry Development Corporation as deputy general manager before returning to the Treasury as assistant secretary of the foreign investment division.

== Politics ==
=== House of Representatives ===
Short was elected to the House of Representatives at the 1975 federal election, retaining the Division of Ballaarat (spelled Ballarat after 1977) for the Liberal Party. He was re-elected in 1977 but his lost his seat to the Australian Labor Party (ALP) candidate John Mildren at the 1980 election.

=== Senate ===
In 1984, he was elected to the Senate.

Short held senior portfolios in the Coalition shadow cabinets of the late 1980s and early 1990s, serving from 1987 to 1988 under John Howard and then from 1990 to 1996 under John Hewson, Alexander Downer and Howard again.

Short was appointed Assistant Treasurer in the First Howard Ministry in March 1996. On 14 October 1996 he resigned his portfolio, after inadvertently misleading the Senate about a conflict of interest.

== Later activities ==
Short resigned from the Senate in 1997 to take up a $150,000-a-year (tax-free) position at the European Bank for Reconstruction and Development, where he remained until 2000. He served as Australian Special Envoy for Cyprus from 2000 to 2007.

Short was made a Member of the Order of Australia in the 2025 Australia Day Honours for significant service to the Parliament of Australia, to multiculturalism, and to international relations.

Australian House of Representatives
Preceded by Dudley Erwin	Member for Ballarat; 1975–1980	Succeeded by John Mildren
