= Division of Ballarat =

Australian federal electoral division

Coordinates: 37.516°S 144.066°E

Ballarat Australian House of Representatives Division
- Interactive map of electorate boundaries from the 2025 federal election
- Created: 1901
- MP: Catherine King
- Party: Labor
- Namesake: Ballarat (historically spelled "Ballaarat", from a Wathaurong Aboriginal word: balla arat, thought to mean "resting place".)
- Electors: 116,296 (2025)
- Area: 5,323 km^{2} (2,055.2 sq mi)
- Demographic: Provincial

The Division of Ballarat (spelt Ballaarat from 1901 until the 1977 election) is an Australian electoral division in the state of Victoria. The division was proclaimed in 1900, and was one of the original 65 divisions to be contested at the first federal election. It was named for the provincial city of the same name by Scottish squatter Archibald Yuille, who established the first settlement − his sheep run called Ballaarat − in 1837, with the name derived from a local Wathawurrung word for the area, balla arat, thought to mean "resting place".

The division currently takes in the regional City of Ballarat and the smaller towns of Gordon, Meredith, Buninyong, Clunes, Creswick, Daylesford, and Trentham and part of Burrumbeet.

The current Member for Ballarat, since the 2001 federal election, is Catherine King, a member of the Australian Labor Party.

== Geography ==
Since 1984, federal electoral division boundaries in Australia have been determined at redistributions by a redistribution committee appointed by the Australian Electoral Commission. Redistributions occur for the boundaries of divisions in a particular state, and they occur every seven years, or sooner if a state's representation entitlement changes or when divisions of a state are malapportioned.

Ballarat consists of the City of Ballarat and Shire of Hepburn, as well as portions of the shires of Golden Plains and Moorabool.

== History ==
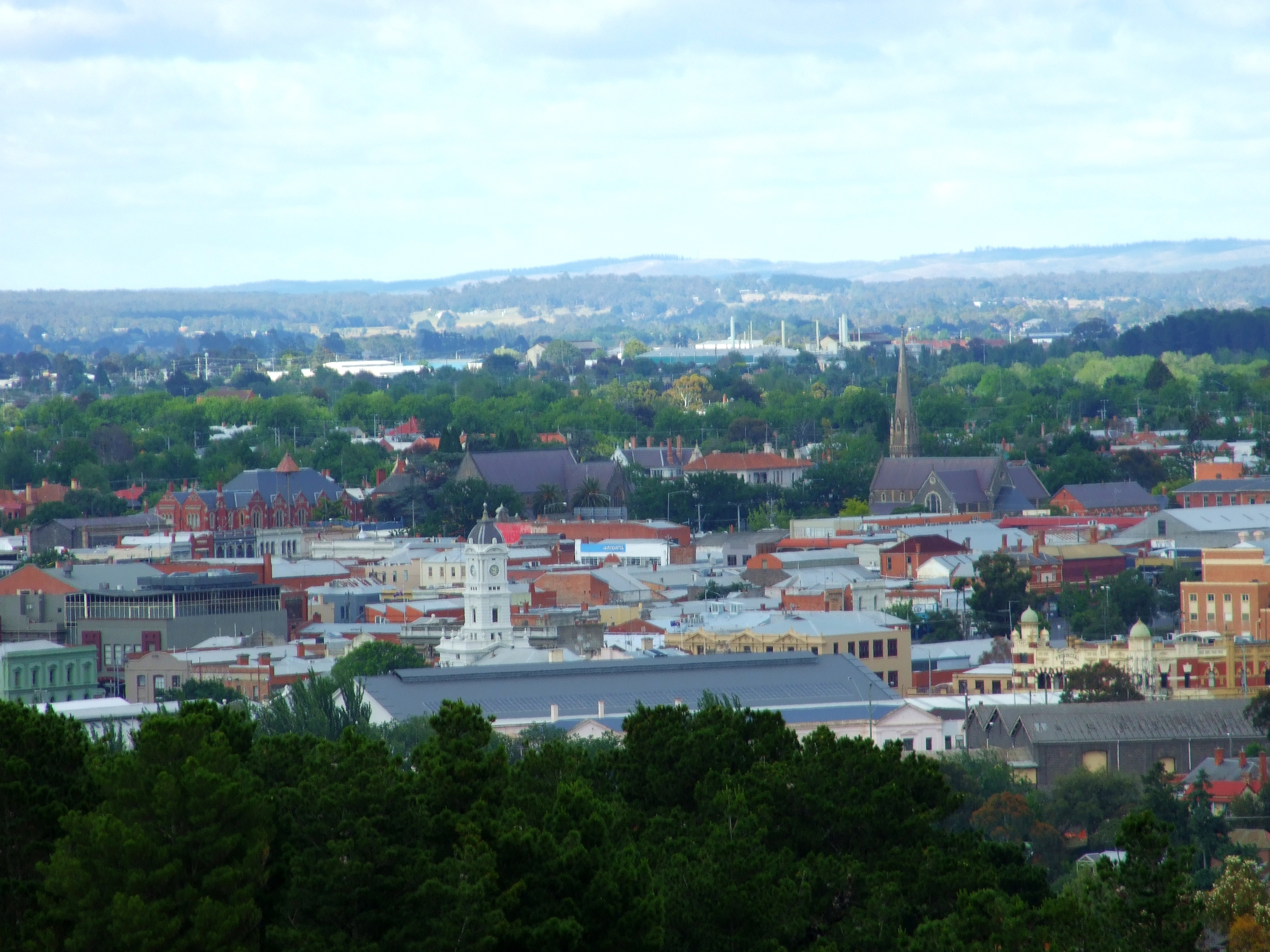
The city of Ballarat, the division's namesake

At various times in its existence the division has included other towns such as Ararat, Maryborough, and Stawell. The towns of Ballan, Bacchus Marsh, Blackwood and Myrniong were previously in the division before the division of Hawke was formed for the 2022 federal election.

Ballarat used to be a marginal seat, changing hands at intervals between the Labor Party and the non-Labor parties. Unlike most marginal seats, it was not a barometer for winning government; since 1955, all but one of its members has spent at least one term in opposition.

Its most prominent member has been Alfred Deakin, who was Prime Minister of Australia three times. Liberal senator Michael Ronaldson was the grandson of Archibald Fisken, a former Member for Ballarat.

Ballarat also holds the distinction of seeing the closest seat result in Australian history. Nationalist Edwin Kerby unseated Labor incumbent Charles McGrath by a single vote in 1919. However, McGrath alleged irregularities, and the result was thrown out in 1920, forcing a by-election that was won by McGrath.

Since 2001, the seat has been held by Catherine King, a member of the Australian Labor Party. It has been a safe Labor seat since 2007 except for a 6.8 percent swing towards the Liberal Party at the 2013 election turning it marginal for one term.

== Members ==
Image	Member	Party	Term	Notes
	Alfred Deakin (1856–1919)	Protectionist	30 March 1901 – 26 May 1909	Previously held the Victorian Legislative Assembly seat of Essendon and Flemington. Served as minister under Barton. Served as Prime Minister from 1903 to 1904, 1905 to 1908 and 1909 to 1910. Served as Opposition Leader in 1909, and from 1910 to 1913. Retired
	Alfred Deakin (1856–1919)	Liberal	26 May 1909 – 23 April 1913	Previously held the Victorian Legislative Assembly seat of Essendon and Flemington. Served as minister under Barton. Served as Prime Minister from 1903 to 1904, 1905 to 1908 and 1909 to 1910. Served as Opposition Leader in 1909, and from 1910 to 1913. Retired
	Charles McGrath (1872–1934)	Labor	31 May 1913 – 13 December 1919	Lost seat by one vote
	Edwin Kerby (1885–1971)	Nationalist	13 December 1919 – 2 June 1920	1919 election results declared void. Lost seat in subsequent by-election
	Charles McGrath (1872–1934)	Labor	2 June 1920 – March 1931	Died in office
	Charles McGrath (1872–1934)	Independent	March 1931 – 7 May 1931	Died in office
	Charles McGrath (1872–1934)	United Australia	7 May 1931 – 31 July 1934	Died in office
	Archibald Fisken (1897–1970)	United Australia	15 September 1934 – 23 October 1937	Retired. Grandson is Michael Ronaldson
	Reg Pollard (1894–1981)	Labor	23 October 1937 – 10 December 1949	Previously held the Victorian Legislative Assembly seat of Bulla and Dalhousie. Served as minister under Chifley. Transferred to the Division of Lalor
	Alan Pittard (1902–1992)	Liberal	10 December 1949 – 28 April 1951	Lost seat
	Bob Joshua (1906–1970)	Labor	28 April 1951 – April 1955	Lost seat
	Bob Joshua (1906–1970)	Labor (Anti-Communist)	April 1955 – 10 December 1955	Lost seat
	Dudley Erwin (1917–1984)	Liberal	10 December 1955 – 11 November 1975	Served as Chief Government Whip in the House under Holt, McEwen and Gorton. Served as minister under Gorton. Retired
	Jim Short (1936–)	Liberal	13 December 1975 – 18 October 1980	Lost seat. Later elected to the Senate in 1984
	John Mildren (1932–2024)	Labor	18 October 1980 – 24 March 1990	Lost seat
	Michael Ronaldson (1954–)	Liberal	24 March 1990 – 8 October 2001	Served as Chief Government Whip in the House under Howard. Retired. Later elected to the Senate in 2004. Grandfather was Archibald Fisken
	Catherine King (1966–)	Labor	10 November 2001 – present	Served as minister under Gillard and Rudd. Incumbent. Currently a minister under Albanese

== Election results ==
2025 Australian federal election: Ballarat
Party	Candidate	Votes	%	±%
Labor	Catherine King	44,273	42.35	−2.40
Liberal	Paula Doran	29,883	28.59	+1.50
Greens	John Barnes	14,984	14.33	−0.26
One Nation	Terri Pryse-Smith	8,029	7.68	+4.08
Family First	Ian Harkness	3,057	2.92	+2.92
Independent	Luke Parker	2,934	2.81	+2.81
Libertarian	Ryan Redfern	1,380	1.32	−2.01
Total formal votes		104,540	96.35	+1.38
Informal votes		3,955	3.65	−1.38
Turnout		108,495	93.34	+3.61
Two-party-preferred result
Labor	Catherine King	63,419	60.66	−2.32
Liberal	Paula Doran	41,121	39.34	+2.32
Labor hold		Swing	−2.32	

Alluvial diagram illustrating the full distribution of preferences in the seat of Ballarat for the 2025 Federal Election
