= Edwin Kerby =

Australian politician

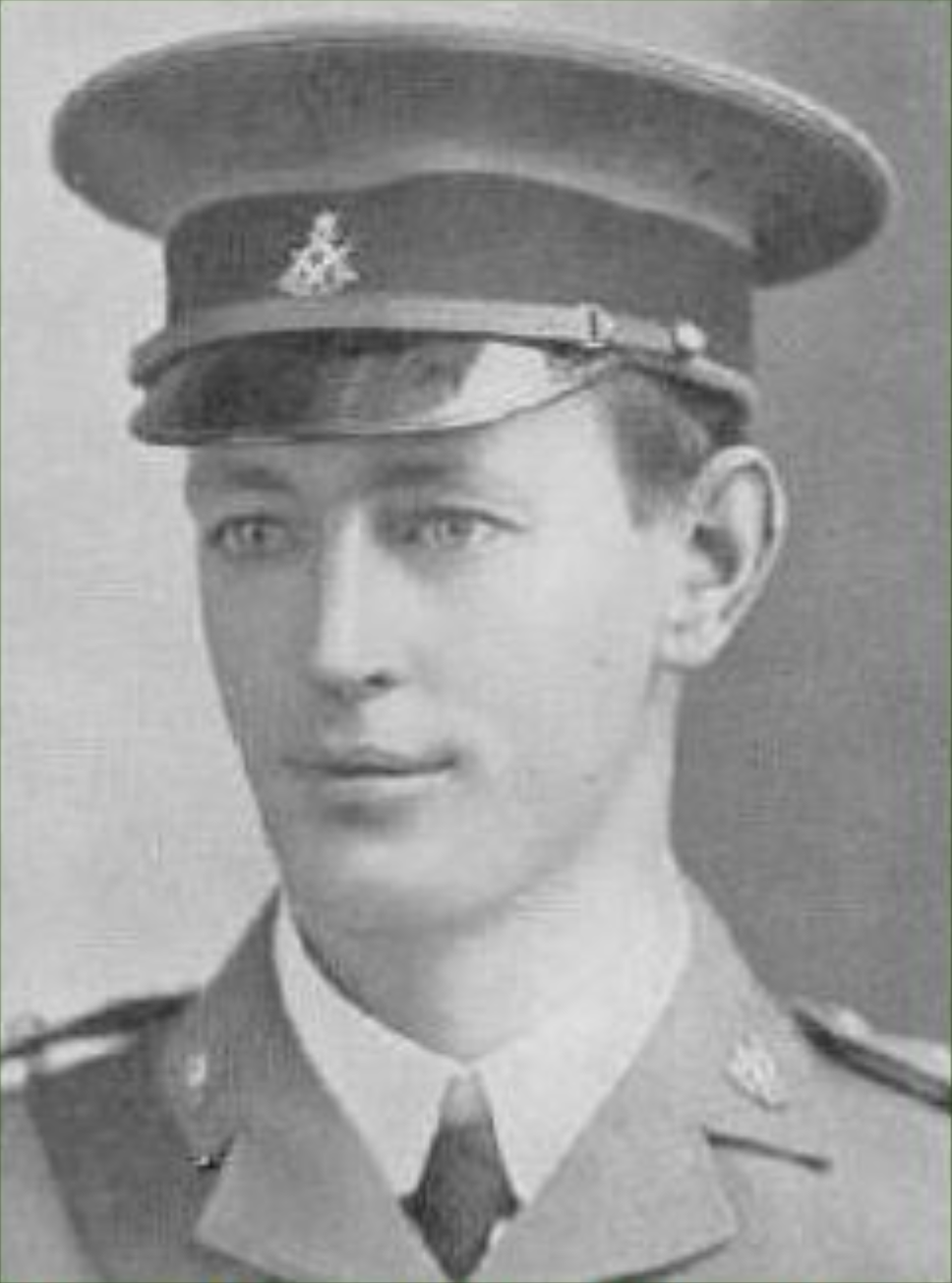

Member of the Australian Parliament for Ballaarat
- In office 13 December 1919 – 2 June 1920
- Preceded by: Charles McGrath
- Succeeded by: Charles McGrath

Personal details
- Born: 12 April 1888 Ballarat, Victoria
- Died: 5 July 1971 (aged 83) Macleod Repatriation Sanatorium, Macleod, Victoria
- Party: Nationalist Party of Australia
- Occupation: Mining engineer

Edwin Thomas John Kerby (12 April 1888 – 5 July 1971) was an Australian politician.

== Family ==
The son of James Macklam Kerby (1861—1944), and Margaret Ann Kerby (1856—1941), née Brennan, Edwin Thomas John Kerby was born at Ballarat, Victoria on 12 April 1888.

He married Rosina May Prisk (1888—1980), later Mrs. Oliver Gladstone Longstaff, at Ballarat on 3 May 1911. He married Elizabeth Beatrice Simons Beauchamp (1898—1986) in 1945.

== Early life ==
He attended Grenville College, Ballarat, before becoming a mining engineer and electrical contractor.

== Military service ==
He served in World War I from 1914 to 1919. During his service he was awarded the 1914-15 Star, British War Medal, and the Victory Medal.

== Politician ==
In 1919, he was selected as the Nationalist candidate for the Australian House of Representatives seat of Ballaarat, and defeated sitting Labor MP Charles McGrath by one vote, the closest result ever recorded for the House of Representatives. McGrath successfully challenged Kerby's election in the courts, and a by-election was held in 1920 and won by McGrath. Kerby became a businessman, focusing mainly on aviation, and became prominent among ex-servicemen's causes; he held the leadership of the RSL. He died in 1971.

== Amateur radio ==
Throughout his adult life Kerby maintained an interest in amateur radio and held the callsigns VK7EK while resident at Ringarooma, Tasmania (1932 to 1939) and VK3KK while living in Auburn, Melbourne, Victoria (1946 to 1969).

== Death ==
He died at the Macleod Repatriation Sanatorium, in Macleod, Victoria, on 5 July 1971.

== Notes ==
Parliament of Australia
| Preceded by Charles McGrath | Member for Ballaarat; 1919 – 1920 | Succeeded by Charles McGrath |
