= Bulgana Green Power Hub =

Wind farm in Victoria, Australia

- Country: Australia
- Coordinates: 37°02′22″S 142°58′58″E
- Status: Under construction
- Construction began: May 2018
- Construction cost: 350 million AU$
- Owner: HMC Capital

Wind farm
- Type: Onshore

Power generation
- Units operational: 56 × 3.4 MW
- Make and model: Siemens Gamesa SG 3.4-132 (56)
- Nameplate capacity: 194 MW
- Storage capacity: 34 MW h

External links
- Website: bulganagreenpowerhub.com.au

Bulgana Green Power Hub is a wind farm north of Stawell in the Australian state of Victoria. The project is owned by HMC Capital. Construction of the 56 wind turbines, with a total generation capacity of 194MW, was completed in August 2019, and connections to the national grid reached full capacity in 2021.

90% of the energy is contracted for supply to the Government of Victoria. The EPC contract and 25 years of maintenance is with Siemens Gamesa Renewable Energy.
