= Alan Pittard =

Australian politician

Alan Pittard OBE
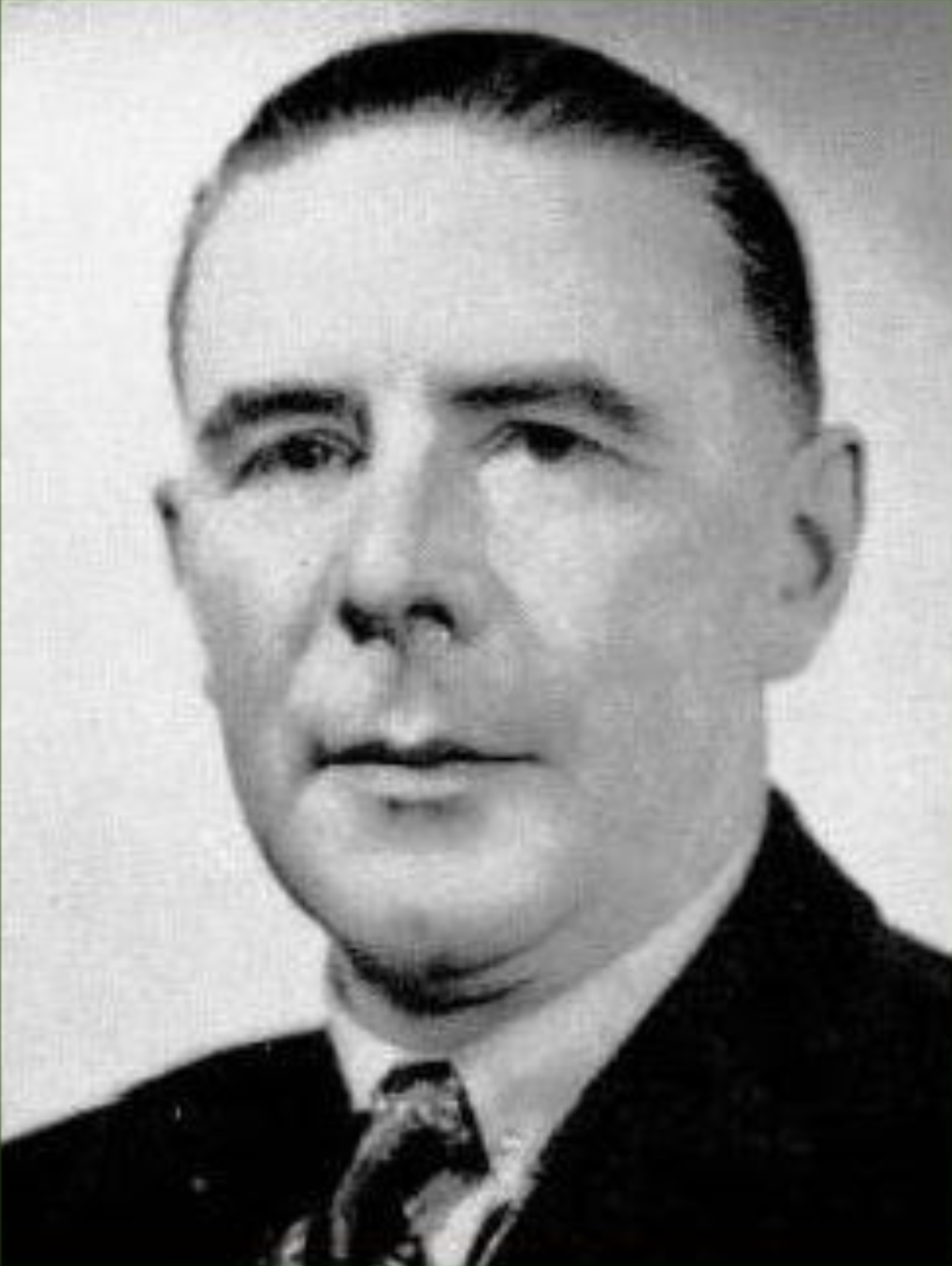

Member of the Australian Parliament for Ballaarat
- In office 10 December 1949 – 28 April 1951
- Preceded by: Reg Pollard
- Succeeded by: Bob Joshua

Personal details
- Born: 15 November 1902 Ballarat, Victoria
- Died: 25 December 1992 (aged 90)
- Party: Liberal Party of Australia
- Occupation: Shoe retailer

Alan Crocker Pittard OBE (15 November 1902 – 25 December 1992) was an Australian politician. Born in Ballarat, Victoria to state politician Alfred Pittard, he attended Ballarat Grammar School before becoming a shoe retailer. He served on Ballarat City Council before serving in the military 1939–45. In 1949, he was elected to the Australian House of Representatives as the Liberal member for Ballaarat. He was defeated by Labor's Bob Joshua in 1951, and returned to Ballarat as a businessman. He was later Commissioner of the Victorian Public Health Authority. Pittard died on Christmas Day 1992.

Parliament of Australia
Preceded by Reg Pollard	Member for Ballaarat; 1949 – 1951	Succeeded by Bob Joshua
