= Charles McGrath (politician) =

Australian politician

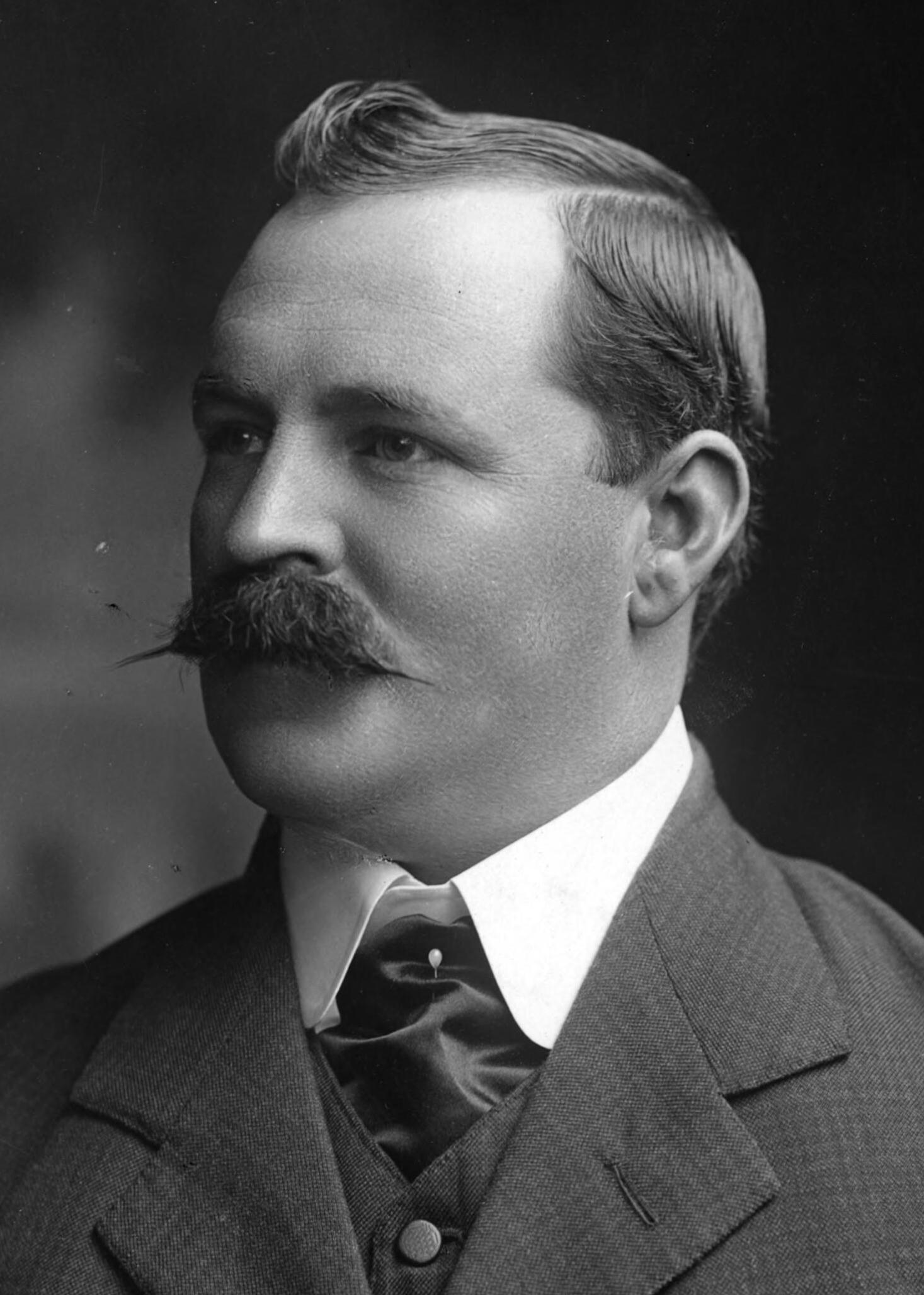

Member of the Australian Parliament for Ballaarat
- In office 31 May 1913 – 13 December 1919
- Preceded by: Alfred Deakin
- Succeeded by: Edwin Kerby
- In office 10 July 1920 – 31 July 1934
- Preceded by: Edwin Kerby
- Succeeded by: Archibald Fisken

Personal details
- Born: 10 November 1872 Newtown, Victoria
- Died: 31 July 1934 (aged 61)
- Party: Labor (1913–31); UAP (1931–34)
- Spouse: Elizabeth Johnstone Gullan
- Occupation: Storekeeper

David Charles McGrath (10 November 1872 – 31 July 1934) was an Australian politician. Originally a member of the Australian Labor Party, he joined Joseph Lyons in the 1931 Labor split that led to the formation of the United Australia Party.

== Early life ==
McGrath was born at Newtown, Victoria to David McGrath, an Irish-born miner, and Evelyn, née Horsefield, an Englishwoman. He attended Newtown State and Creswick Grammar schools before working at the family store at Allendale. He was a playing member of the South Ballarat Football Club during the 1890s and a former president of the club too.

He married Elizabeth Johnstone Gullan in Ballarat on 24 May 1898; the couple moved to Pitfield Plains in 1900 to expand the family business.

== State politics ==
In 1904, McGrath was elected to the Victorian Legislative Assembly for Labor, representing the seat of Grenville. He became known as a spokesman for the mining industry, and earned the nickname "Bull" for his promotion of Labor in country areas; with Frank Anstey, he travelled extensively in the Gippsland area in November 1904.

== Federal politics ==
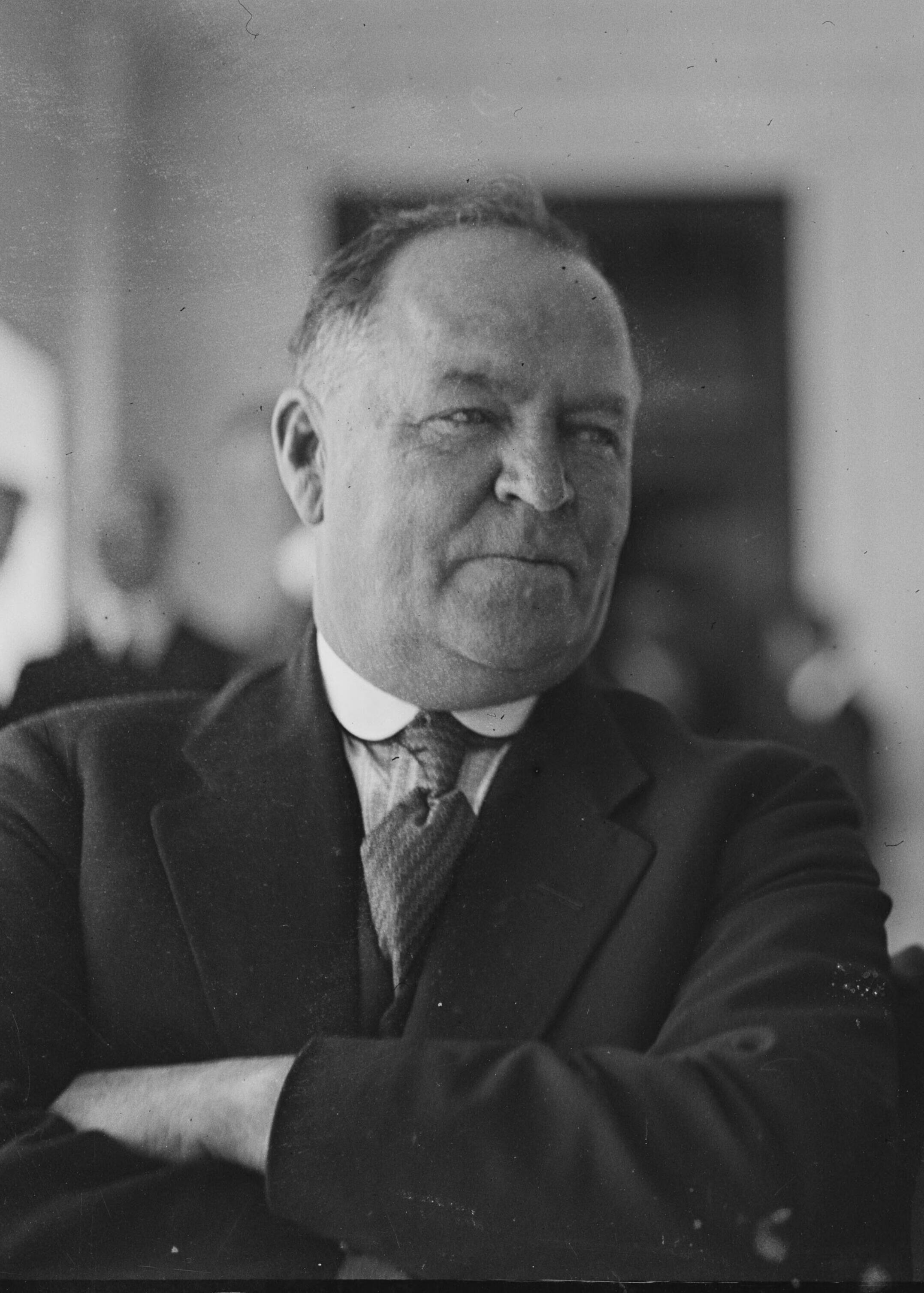
McGrath in 1929

In May 1913, McGrath transferred to the federal House of Representatives, representing the seat of Ballaarat. A vocal advocate for improved conditions for soldiers, McGrath enlisted in the armed forces in March 1916, travelling overseas as part of the Australian Imperial Force. He was promoted to warrant officer in December 1916 and was discharged as medically unfit in 1918.

McGrath lost the 1919 election by a single vote to Nationalist challenger Edwin Kerby. However, McGrath alleged irregularities in the count. As a result, the election was declared void and a by-election was held in July 1920, in which McGrath was elected. He continued to support soldiers' issues, notably repatriation benefits, and criticised the method of bestowing Imperial honours.

Following the election of the Scullin government at the 1929 federal election, McGrath was elected chairman of committees. In the wake of the Great Depression he became drawn to Sir Otto Niemeyer's solution to the nation's financial situation. As a result, in 1931 he was one of the Labor members who joined Joseph Lyons in leaving the Labor Party and merging with the Nationalists to form the United Australia Party (UAP). He was thus reunited with a number of former Labor members who favoured conscription in World War I; he had opposed it at the time.

McGrath remained chairman of committees until parliament was dissolved prior to the 1931 election. He was re-elected as a UAP member and continued in parliament until his death from ill health in 1934. He was buried in Ballarat, and was survived by his wife, two daughters and two sons.

Victorian Legislative Assembly
Preceded by Austin Austin	Member for Grenville; 1904–1913	Succeeded by John Chatham
Australian House of Representatives
Preceded by Alfred Deakin	Member for Ballaarat; 1913–1919	Succeeded by Edwin Kerby
Preceded by Edwin Kerby	Member for Ballaarat; 1920–1934	Succeeded by Archibald Fisken
