= Archibald Fisken =

Australian politician (1897–1970)

Archibald Fisken CMG, OBE, MC
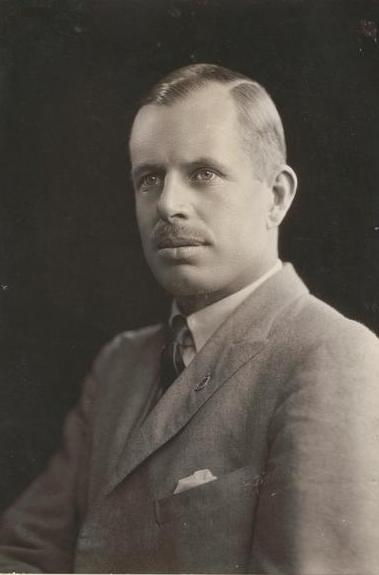

Member of the Australian Parliament for Ballaarat
- In office 15 September 1934 – 23 October 1937
- Preceded by: Charles McGrath
- Succeeded by: Reg Pollard

Personal details
- Born: 1 March 1897 Ballarat, Victoria
- Died: 20 June 1970 (aged 73) Lal Lal, Victoria
- Party: United Australia Party
- Spouse: Elspeth Anne Cameron
- Occupation: Pastoralist
- Awards: Companion of the Order of St Michael and St George; Officer of the Order of the British Empire; Military Cross

Military service
- Allegiance: United Kingdom
- Branch/service: British Army
- Years of service: 1916–1919
- Rank: Lieutenant
- Unit: Royal Field Artillery
- Battles/wars: First World War

Archibald Clyde Wanliss Fisken CMG, OBE, MC (11 March 1897 – 20 June 1970) was an Australian soldier and politician. He was a member of the House of Representatives from 1934 to 1937, representing the United Australia Party (UAP).

== Early life ==
Fisken was born at Ballarat, Victoria, to grazier Archibald James Fisken and Beatrice Mary, née Wanliss. He attended E.N. Maryatt's Church of England Grammar School for Boys, Ballarat College and Geelong Church of England Grammar School before his 1916 commission in the Royal Field Artillery. He served on the Western Front from 1916 to 1918; in 1918 he was awarded the Military Cross and promoted to lieutenant, although he was also wounded.

Returning from the war, Fisken maintained the family property (Lal Lal, in the family since 1846) at Yendon. He was elected to the Shire of Buninyong Council in 1922 and remained a councillor until his death, being president in 1931–32, 1946–47, 1957–58 and 1966–67. He was prominent in the community, both as a sportsman and as a pastoralist. He married Elspeth Anne Cameron on 20 February 1924 at Ross, Tasmania.

== Federal politics ==
Fisken was elected to the federal House of Representatives in 1934, as the United Australia Party member for Ballaarat. He was notably concerned with unemployment, stating that "all the ills of the country would be rectified" if the problem was solved. Although mentioned as a possibility for promotion to the ministry, Fisken retired from parliament in 1937, stating that he wished to focus on his appointment as chairman of the Australian Meat Board.

== Later life ==
Fisken continued on the Meat Board for many years, serving as chairman until 1946. He expanded the market for Australian meat, notably in Britain and North America. Fisken was also appointed to the Meat Industry Commission on its creation in 1943, and acted as deputy-controller of meat supplies for Victoria from 1943 to 1945. He also held positions as chairman of Dennys, Lascelles Ltd, a director of the Commercial Union Assurance Company, and a life member and trustee of the Royal Agricultural Society of Victoria. He also contributed much time and effort towards establishing a Ballarat tertiary education institution. Appointed an Officer of the Order of the British Empire in 1958 and Companion of the Order of St Michael and St George in 1963, Fisken died at Lal Lal on 20 June 1970 and was cremated. He was survived by his wife, son, and three daughters.

Parliament of Australia
Preceded by Charles McGrath	Member for Ballaarat; 1934–1937	Succeeded by Reg Pollard
