= 1906 Australian House of Representatives election =

Australian federal election, 12 December 1906 House of Representatives << 1903–1910 >>
Enrolled voters	2,109,562				
Votes cast	1,001,593		Turnout	47.48	+8.43
Informal votes	49,904		Informal	4.98	+2.48
Summary of votes by party
Party	Primary votes	%	Swing	Seats	Change
Labour	348,712	36.64%	+6.86%	26	+4
Anti-Socialist	345,781	36.33%	+4.60%	26	+2
Protectionist	155,991	16.39%	–12.84%	16	–10
Western Australian	22,154	2.33%	+2.33%	2	+2
Independent	79,051	8.31%	–0.46%	5	+3
Total	951,689			75	

This is a list of electoral division results from the1906 Australian federal election.

== New South Wales ==
1906 Australian federal election (New South Wales)
← 1903	12 December 1906	1910 →

All 27 New South Wales seats in the House of Representatives
- Registered: 737,599
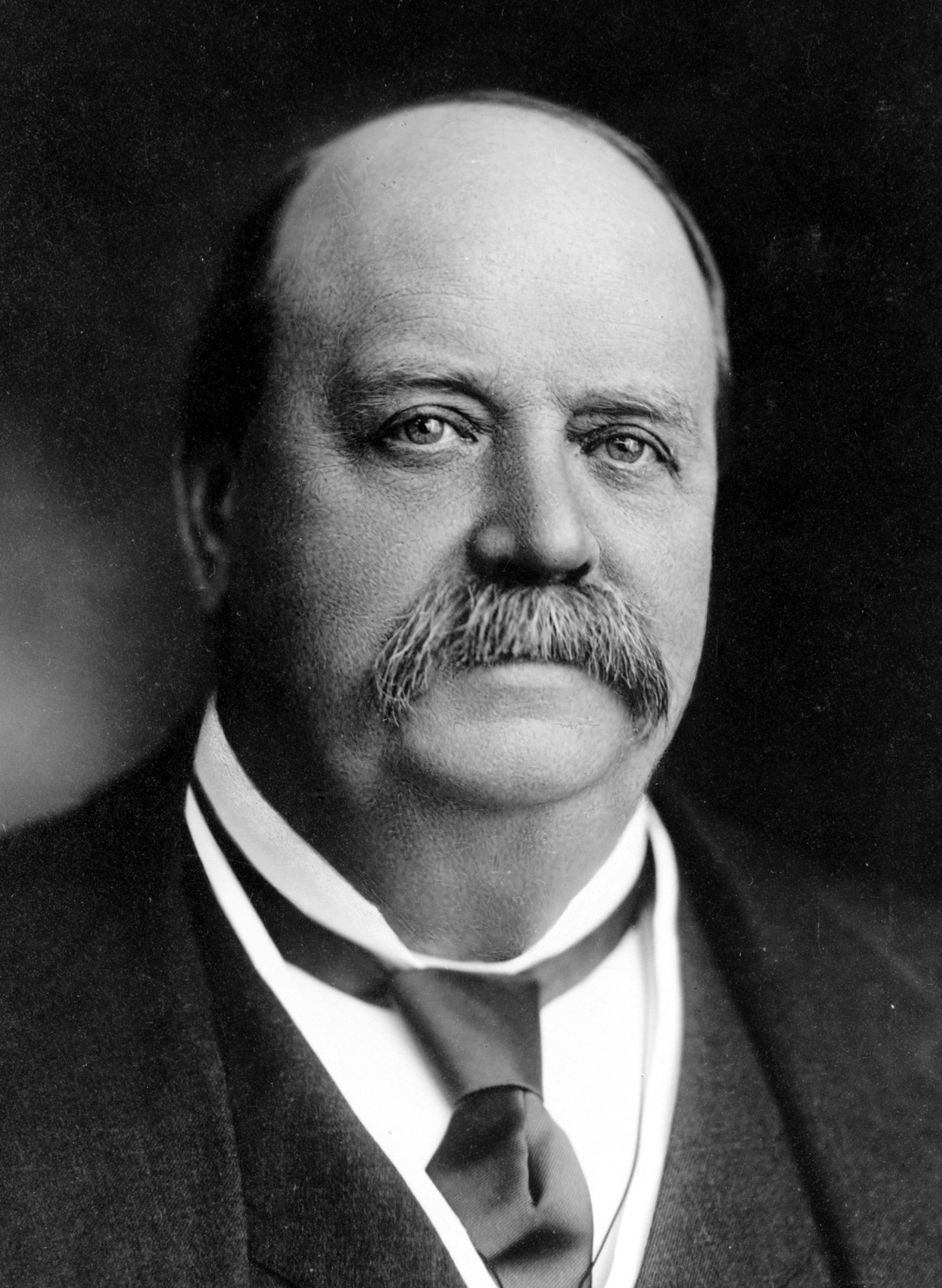

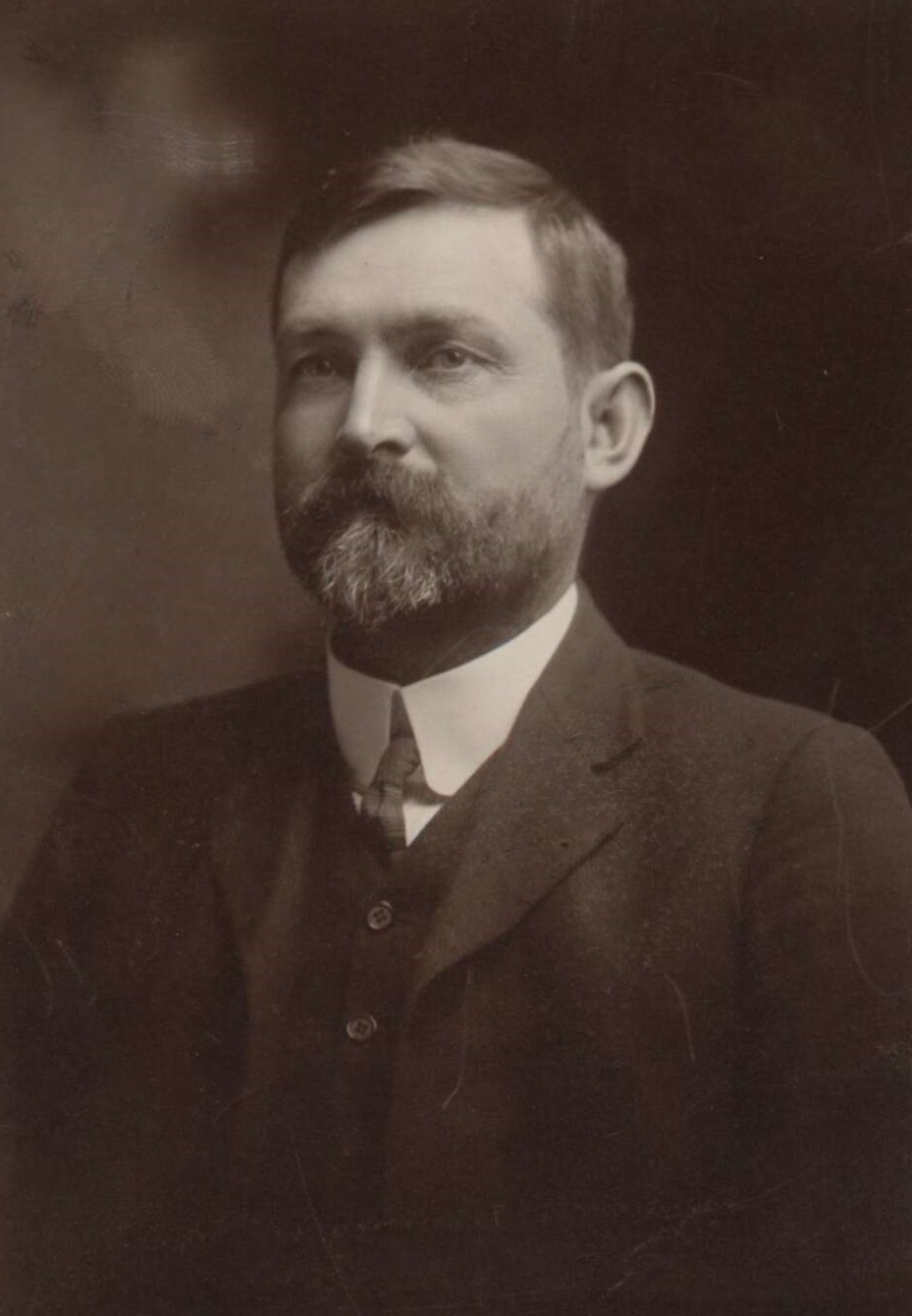

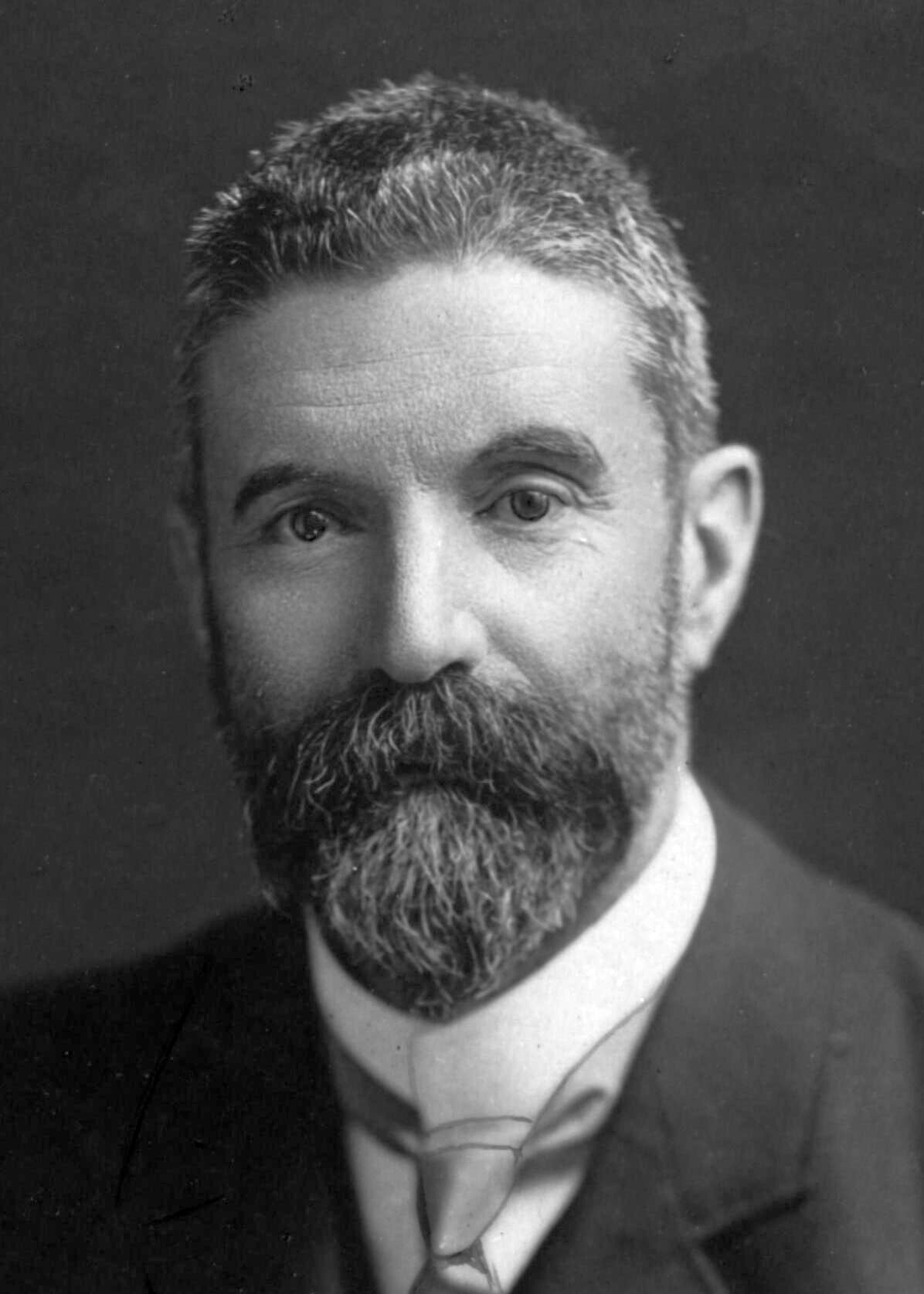
	First party	Second party	Third party
Leader	George Reid	Chris Watson	Alfred Deakin
Party	Anti-Socialist	Labour	Protectionist
Last election	16 seats	7 seats	3 seats
Seats won	11	11	5
Seat change	▼5	▲4	▲2
Popular vote	172,594	133,091	34,700
Percentage	49.93%	38.50%	15.18%
Swing	▼4.82	▲17.21	▼11.38

=== Barrier ===
1906 Australian federal election: Barrier
Party	Candidate	Votes	%	±%
Labour	Josiah Thomas	5,602	74.5	−7.5
Anti-Socialist	George Marshall	1,919	25.5	+25.5
Total formal votes		7,521	95.8	
Informal votes		311	4.2	
Turnout		7,832	31.1	
Labour hold		Swing	−7.5	

=== Calare ===
1906 Australian federal election: Calare
Party	Candidate	Votes	%	±%
Labour	Thomas Brown	6,759	50.7	
Anti-Socialist	John Fitzpatrick	6,565	49.3	
Total formal votes		13,324	97.1	
Informal votes		393	2.9	
Turnout		13,717	51.7	
Labour hold		Swing		

=== Cook ===
1906 Australian federal election: Cook
Party	Candidate	Votes	%	±%
Labour	James Catts	8,563	53.0	
Anti-Socialist	John Hindle	7,591	47.0	
Total formal votes		16,154	97.2	
Informal votes		470	2.8	
Turnout		14,725	52.5	
Labour hold		Swing		

=== Cowper ===
1906 Australian federal election: Cowper
Party	Candidate	Votes	%	±%
Protectionist	John Thomson	4,794	43.1	+6.1
Anti-Socialist	Henry Lee	4,602	41.4	−21.6
Independent	Eugene Rudder	1,316	11.8	+11.8
Labour	John O'Brien	399	3.6	+3.6
Total formal votes		11,111	96.5	
Informal votes		404	3.5	
Turnout		11,515	41.7	
Protectionist gain from Anti-Socialist		Swing	+13.9	

=== Dalley ===
1906 Australian federal election: Dalley
Party	Candidate	Votes	%	±%
Anti-Socialist	William Wilks	9,863	52.7	−22.2
Labour	Robert Howe	8,850	47.3	+47.3
Total formal votes		18,713	97.5	
Informal votes		481	2.5	
Turnout		19,194	63.9	
Anti-Socialist hold		Swing	−22.2	

=== Darling ===
1906 Australian federal election: Darling
Party	Candidate	Votes	%	±%
Labour	William Spence	6,356	57.9	−0.3
Anti-Socialist	Denis Acton	4,626	42.1	+0.3
Total formal votes		10,982	95.4	
Informal votes		532	4.6	
Turnout		11,514	43.9	
Labour hold		Swing	−0.3	

=== East Sydney ===
1906 Australian federal election: East Sydney
Party	Candidate	Votes	%	±%
Anti-Socialist	George Reid	7,229	54.9	−6.4
Labour	John West	5,936	45.1	+12.5
Total formal votes		13,165	98.0	
Informal votes		275	2.0	
Turnout		13,440	49.0	
Anti-Socialist hold		Swing	−9.5	

=== Eden-Monaro ===
1906 Australian federal election: Eden-Monaro
Party	Candidate	Votes	%	±%
Protectionist	Austin Chapman	7,979	67.8	−32.2
Anti-Socialist	John Longmuir	3,789	32.2	+32.2
Total formal votes		11,768	95.4	
Informal votes		571	4.6	
Turnout		12,339	52.6	
Protectionist hold		Swing	−32.2	

=== Gwydir ===
1906 Australian federal election: Gwydir
Party	Candidate	Votes	%	±%
Labour	William Webster	7,118	53.3	−0.2
Anti-Socialist	Thomas Cunningham	6,246	46.7	+16.0
Total formal votes		13,364	96.8	
Informal votes		442	3.2	
Turnout		13,806	53.6	
Labour hold		Swing	−8.1	

=== Hume ===
1906 Australian federal election: Hume
Party	Candidate	Votes	%	±%
Protectionist	Sir William Lyne	9,223	61.7	+1.7
Anti-Socialist	James Gibb	5,727	38.3	−1.7
Total formal votes		14,950	98.2	
Informal votes		274	1.8	
Turnout		15,224	60.8	
Protectionist hold		Swing	+1.7	

=== Hunter ===
1906 Australian federal election: Hunter
Party	Candidate	Votes	%	±%
Anti-Socialist	Frank Liddell	6,843	50.8	−8.5
Labour	William Kearsley	6,617	49.2	+41.2
Total formal votes		13,460	97.7	
Informal votes		314	2.3	
Turnout		13,774	51.4	
Anti-Socialist hold		Swing	−12.5	

=== Illawarra ===
1906 Australian federal election: Illawarra
Party	Candidate	Votes	%	±%
Anti-Socialist	George Fuller	9,726	63.8	−36.2
Labour	George Holt	5,528	36.2	+36.2
Total formal votes		15,254	96.9	
Informal votes		486	3.1	
Turnout		15,740	59.6	
Anti-Socialist hold		Swing	−36.2	

=== Lang ===
1906 Australian federal election: Lang
Party	Candidate	Votes	%	±%
Anti-Socialist	Elliot Johnson	11,138	70.4	+19.7
Labour	Edward Bennetts	4,677	29.6	+11.2
Total formal votes		15,815	97.2	
Informal votes		458	2.8	
Turnout		16,273	56.3	
Anti-Socialist hold		Swing	+9.2	

=== Macquarie ===
1906 Australian federal election: Macquarie
Party	Candidate	Votes	%	±%
Labour	Ernest Carr	7,121	51.3	+51.3
Anti-Socialist	Sydney Smith	6,760	48.7	−5.3
Total formal votes		13,881	96.4	
Informal votes		520	3.6	
Turnout		14,401	58.7	
Labour gain from Anti-Socialist		Swing	+51.3	

=== Nepean ===
1906 Australian federal election: Nepean
Party	Candidate	Votes	%	±%
Anti-Socialist	Eric Bowden	9,749	60.6	
Labour	Charles Dyer	5,471	34.0	
Ind. Anti-Socialist	Thomas Taylor	857	5.3	
Total formal votes		16,077	96.0	
Informal votes		677	4.0	
Turnout		16,754	56.4	
Anti-Socialist hold		Swing		

=== Newcastle ===
1906 Australian federal election: Newcastle
Party	Candidate	Votes	%	±%
Labour	David Watkins	11,952	67.2	+4.7
Anti-Socialist	John Hawthorne	5,833	32.8	−4.7
Total formal votes		17,785	97.4	
Informal votes		479	2.6	
Turnout		18,264	61.3	
Labour hold		Swing	+4.7	

=== New England ===
1906 Australian federal election: New England
Party	Candidate	Votes	%	±%
Labour	Frank Foster	7,631	51.8	+51.8
Anti-Socialist	Edmund Lonsdale	7,099	48.2	−3.7
Total formal votes		14,730	96.5	
Informal votes		538	3.5	
Turnout		15,268	54.6	
Labour gain from Anti-Socialist		Swing	+51.8	

=== North Sydney ===
1906 Australian federal election: North Sydney
Party	Candidate	Votes	%	±%
Anti-Socialist	Dugald Thomson	unopposed		
Anti-Socialist hold		Swing		

=== Parkes ===
1906 Australian federal election: Parkes
Party	Candidate	Votes	%	±%
Anti-Socialist	Bruce Smith	11,178	78.2	+4.3
Ind. Anti-Socialist	Hampton Slatyer	3,114	21.8	+21.8
Total formal votes		14,292	95.7	
Informal votes		647	4.3	
Turnout		14,939	49.6	
Anti-Socialist hold		Swing	+0.4	

=== Parramatta ===
1906 Australian federal election: Parramatta
Party	Candidate	Votes	%	±%
Anti-Socialist	Joseph Cook	unopposed		
Anti-Socialist hold		Swing		

=== Richmond ===
1906 Australian federal election: Richmond
Party	Candidate	Votes	%	±%
Protectionist	Thomas Ewing	6,042	76.4	+3.8
Anti-Socialist	John Sutton	1,869	23.6	−3.8
Total formal votes		7,911	96.8	
Informal votes		260	3.2	
Turnout		8,171	31.5	
Protectionist hold		Swing	+3.8	

=== Riverina ===
1906 Australian federal election: Riverina
Party	Candidate	Votes	%	±%
Protectionist	John Chanter	6,662	54.1	+4.1
Anti-Socialist	John Jackson	5,658	45.9	−4.1
Total formal votes		12,320	95.3	
Informal votes		601	4.7	
Turnout		12,921	51.9	
Protectionist hold		Swing	+4.1	

=== Robertson ===
1906 Australian federal election: Robertson
Party	Candidate	Votes	%	±%
Anti-Socialist	Henry Willis	7,199	57.0	−6.5
Labour	William Johnson	5,441	43.0	+43.0
Total formal votes		12,640	96.9	
Informal votes		405	3.1	
Turnout		13,045	49.6	
Anti-Socialist hold		Swing	−6.5	

=== South Sydney ===
1906 Australian federal election: South Sydney
Party	Candidate	Votes	%	±%
Labour	Chris Watson	10,347	56.4	+12.4
Anti-Socialist	James Graham	8,006	43.6	−12.4
Total formal votes		18,353	97.5	
Informal votes		479	2.5	
Turnout		18,832	63.9	
Labour gain from Anti-Socialist		Swing	+12.4	

=== Wentworth ===
1906 Australian federal election: Wentworth
Party	Candidate	Votes	%	±%
Anti-Socialist	Willie Kelly	10,505	73.2	+1.4
Labour	William Duncan	3,846	26.8	+26.8
Total formal votes		14,351	95.3	
Informal votes		701	4.7	
Turnout		15,052	52.8	
Anti-Socialist hold		Swing	+1.4	

=== Werriwa ===
1906 Australian federal election: Werriwa
Party	Candidate	Votes	%	±%
Labour	David Hall	7,316	51.8	+20.5
Anti-Socialist	Alfred Conroy	6,818	48.2	−20.5
Total formal votes		14,134	96.5	
Informal votes		518	3.5	
Turnout		14,652	57.2	
Labour gain from Anti-Socialist		Swing	+20.5	

=== West Sydney ===
1906 Australian federal election: West Sydney
Party	Candidate	Votes	%	±%
Labour	Billy Hughes	7,561	55.5	−14.4
Anti-Socialist	James Burns	6,056	44.5	+14.4
Total formal votes		13,617	96.7	
Informal votes		469	3.3	
Turnout		14,086	50.1	
Labour hold		Swing	−14.4	

== Victoria ==
1906 Australian federal election (Victoria)
← 1903	12 December 1906	1910 →

All 22 Victorian seats in the House of Representatives
- Registered: 672,054
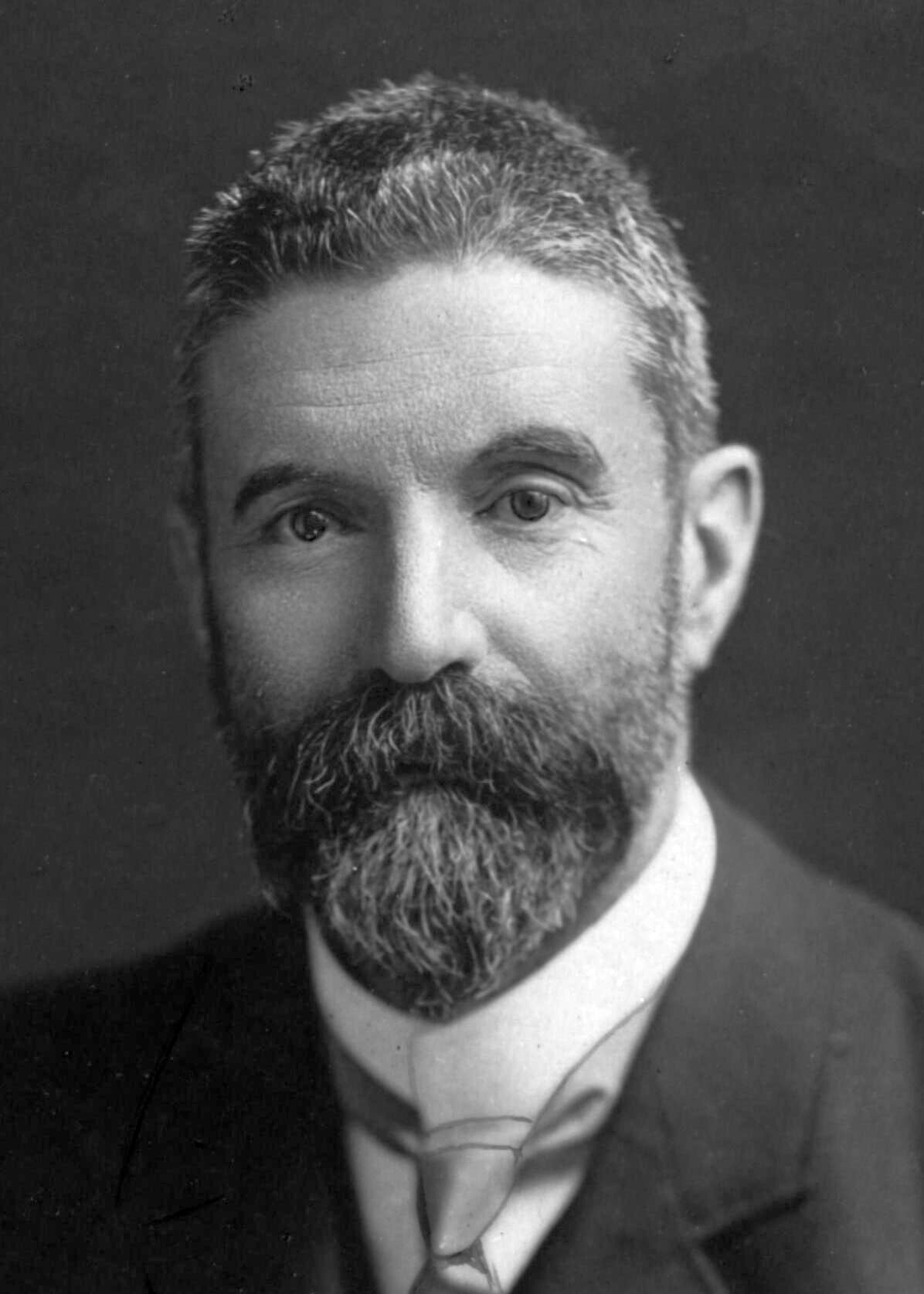

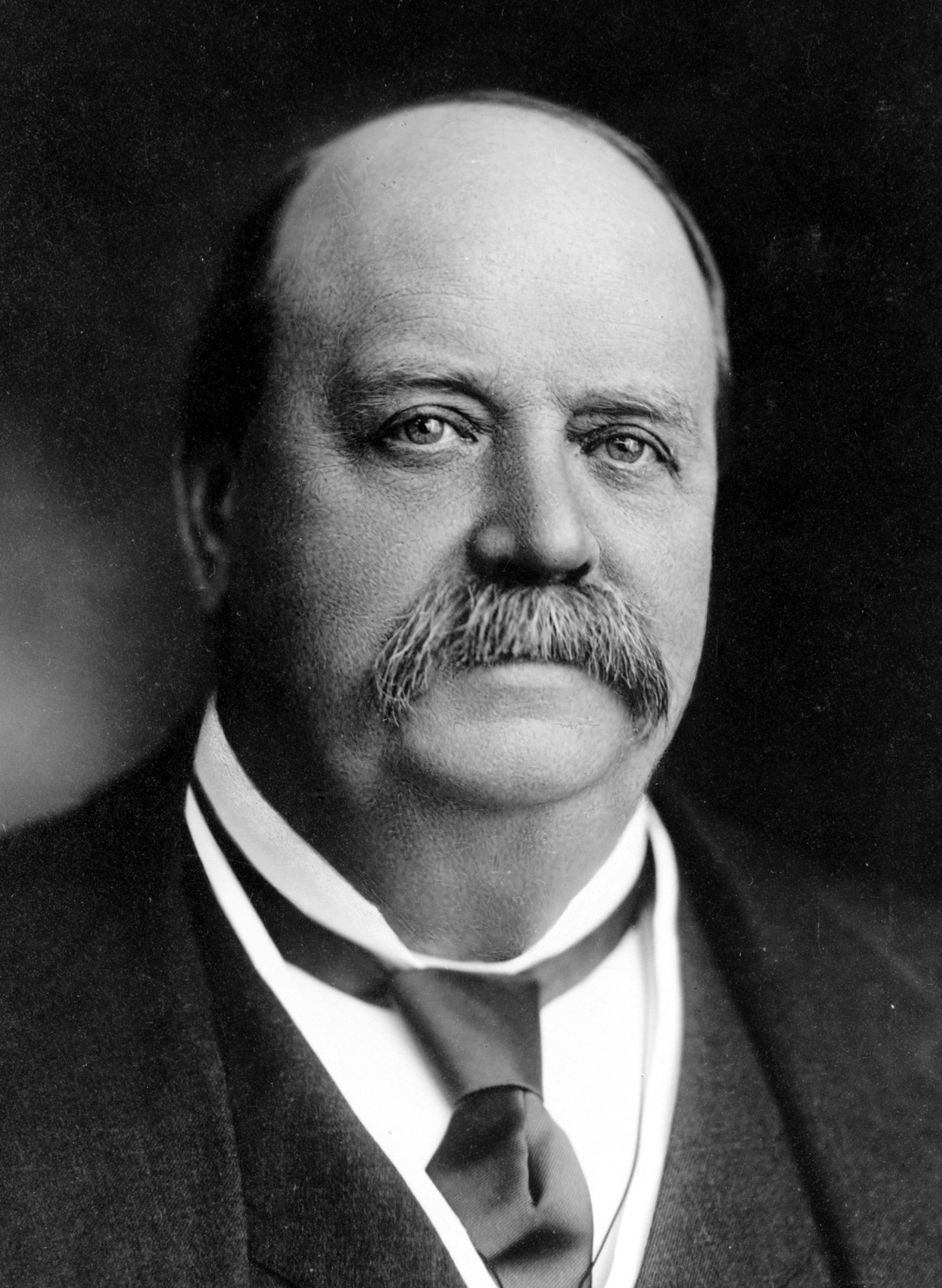

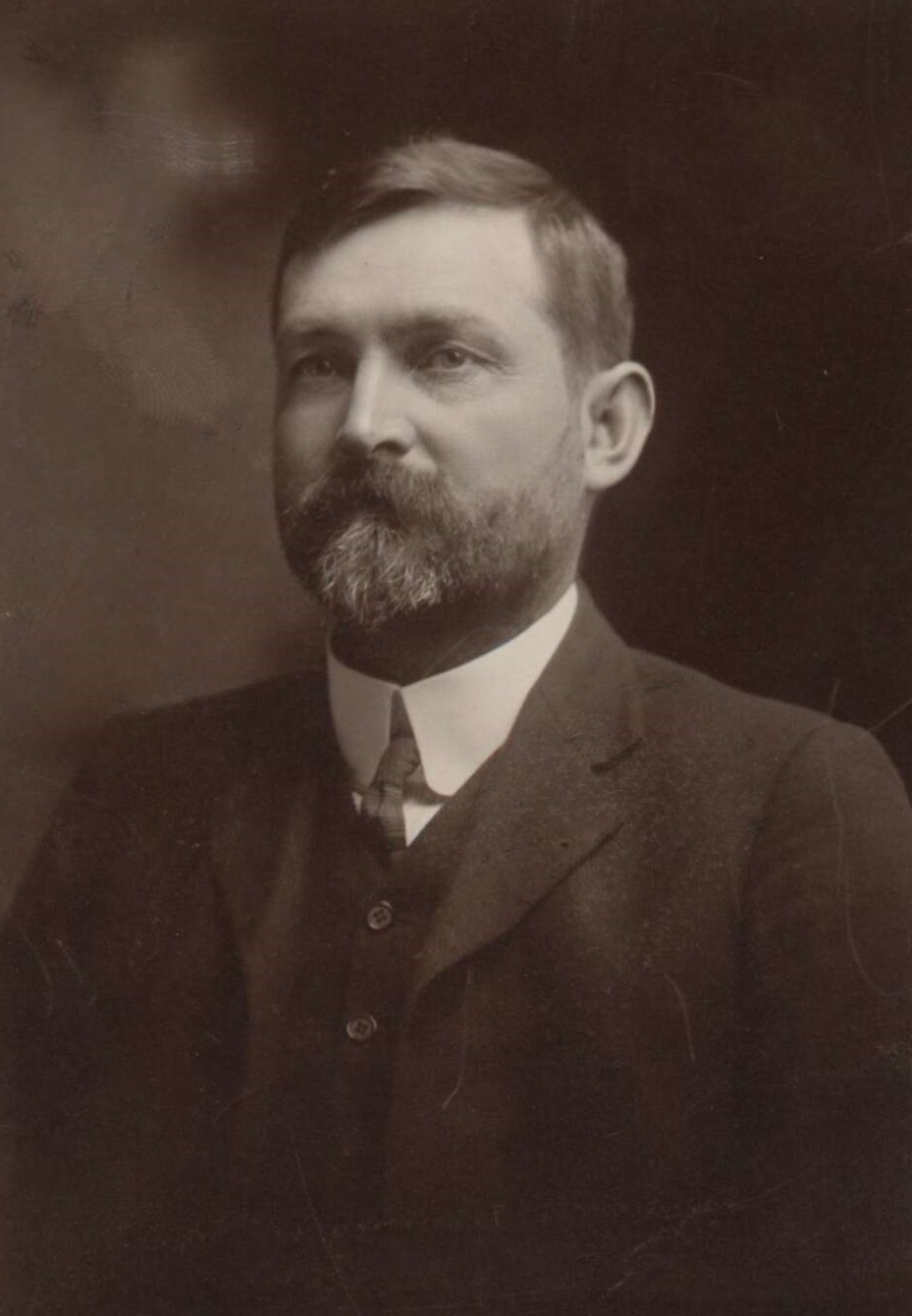
	First party	Second party	Third party
Leader	Alfred Deakin	George Reid	Chris Watson
Party	Protectionist	Anti-Socialist	Labour
Last election	16 seats	5 seats	2 seats
Seats won	8	6	4
Seat change	▼8	▲1	▲2
Popular vote	107,515	83,158	111,626
Percentage	29.32%	22.67%	30.44%
Swing	▼12.02	▲1.23	▲3.49

=== Balaclava ===
1906 Australian federal election: Balaclava
Party	Candidate	Votes	%	±%
Ind. Protectionist	Agar Wynne	6,957	41.8	+41.8
Ind. Anti-Socialist	Joseph Hewison	5,651	33.9	+33.9
Labour	Alfred Hampson	3,263	19.6	+19.6
Protectionist	Edward Roberts	786	4.7	−95.3
Total formal votes		16,657	97.5	
Informal votes		431	2.5	
Turnout		17,088	54.0	
Ind. Protectionist gain from Protectionist		Swing	+41.8	

=== Ballaarat ===
1906 Australian federal election: Ballaarat
Party	Candidate	Votes	%	±%
Protectionist	Alfred Deakin	12,331	66.2	−33.8
Labour	James Scullin	6,305	33.8	+33.8
Total formal votes		18,636	97.8	
Informal votes		412	2.2	
Turnout		19,048	62.5	
Protectionist hold		Swing	−33.8	

=== Batman ===
1906 Australian federal election: Batman
Party	Candidate	Votes	%	±%
Protectionist	Jabez Coon	7,098	50.0	+50.0
Labour	Robert Solly	6,617	46.6	+46.6
Independent	Samuel Painter	330	2.3	+2.3
Ind. Protectionist	Roy Vernon	151	1.1	+1.1
Total formal votes		14,196	95.0	
Informal votes		743	5.0	
Turnout		14,939	48.8	
Protectionist win		(new seat)		

=== Bendigo ===
1906 Australian federal election: Bendigo
Party	Candidate	Votes	%	±%
Ind. Protectionist	Sir John Quick	9,617	51.7	+51.7
Labour	Thomas Glass	8,969	48.3	+29.9
Total formal votes		18,586	97.5	
Informal votes		467	2.5	
Turnout		19,053	59.1	
Ind. Protectionist gain from Protectionist		Swing	+51.7	

=== Bourke ===
1906 Australian federal election: Bourke
Party	Candidate	Votes	%	±%
Protectionist	James Hume Cook	10,745	52.2	+9.8
Labour	Randolph Bedford	8,016	38.9	+0.1
Anti-Socialist	Joseph Molden	1,835	8.9	+8.9
Total formal votes		20,596	97.1	
Informal votes		624	2.9	
Turnout		21,220	63.1	
Protectionist hold		Swing	+4.9	

=== Corangamite ===
1906 Australian federal election: Corangamite
Party	Candidate	Votes	%	±%
Anti-Socialist	Gratton Wilson	7,475	43.9	+8.7
Protectionist	Desmond Dunne	5,237	30.8	+8.1
Labour	Thomas Carey	4,306	25.3	+25.3
Total formal votes		17,018	95.7	
Informal votes		765	4.3	
Turnout		17,783	61.3	
Anti-Socialist hold		Swing	+4.4	

=== Corio ===
1906 Australian federal election: Corio
Party	Candidate	Votes	%	±%
Protectionist	Richard Crouch	10,135	55.0	+9.5
Anti-Socialist	James McCay	8,288	45.0	+8.2
Total formal votes		18,432	96.8	
Informal votes		612	3.2	
Turnout		19,035	62.0	
Protectionist hold		Swing	+0.2	

=== Echuca ===
1906 Australian federal election: Echuca
Party	Candidate	Votes	%	±%
Anti-Socialist	Albert Palmer	7,656	50.1	+13.4
Protectionist	Thomas Kennedy	7,624	49.9	−13.4
Total formal votes		15,280	94.6	
Informal votes		867	5.4	
Turnout		16,147	55.3	
Anti-Socialist gain from Protectionist		Swing	+13.4	

=== Fawkner ===
1906 Australian federal election: Fawkner
Party	Candidate	Votes	%	±%
Ind. Protectionist	George Fairbairn	12,212	60.5	+60.5
Labour	Thomas Smith	6,621	32.8	+32.8
Protectionist	John Miller	1,360	6.7	+6.7
Total formal votes		20,193	96.4	
Informal votes		759	3.6	
Turnout		20,952	57.3	
Ind. Protectionist win		(new seat)		

=== Flinders ===
1906 Australian federal election: Flinders
Party	Candidate	Votes	%	±%
Anti-Socialist	William Irvine	7,621	51.5	+15.2
Protectionist	Arthur Nichols	7,184	48.5	+21.2
Total formal votes		14,805	95.7	
Informal votes		659	4.3	
Turnout		15,464	54.3	
Anti-Socialist hold		Swing	−3.0	

=== Gippsland ===
1906 Australian federal election: Gippsland
Party	Candidate	Votes	%	±%
Protectionist	George Wise	7,825	50.3	−49.7
Anti-Socialist	Allan McLean	7,728	49.7	+49.7
Total formal votes		15,553	96.3	
Informal votes		601	3.7	
Turnout		16,154	55.2	
Protectionist hold		Swing	−49.7	

=== Grampians ===
1906 Australian federal election: Grampians
Party	Candidate	Votes	%	±%
Anti-Socialist	Hans Irvine	7,598	55.8	+19.5
Labour	Edward Grayndler	6,013	44.2	+18.3
Total formal votes		13,611	95.6	
Informal votes		633	4.4	
Turnout		14,244	50.5	
Anti-Socialist hold		Swing	+3.2	

=== Indi ===
1906 Australian federal election: Indi
Party	Candidate	Votes	%	±%
Anti-Socialist	Joseph Brown	6,801	44.4	+44.4
Labour	Daniel Turnbull	5,986	39.0	+39.0
Protectionist	Thomas McInerney	2,546	16.6	+16.6
Total formal votes		15,333	94.6	
Informal votes		872	5.4	
Turnout		16,205	55.0	
Anti-Socialist gain from Protectionist		Swing	+44.4	

=== Kooyong ===
1906 Australian federal election: Kooyong
Party	Candidate	Votes	%	±%
Anti-Socialist	William Knox	12,018	58.7	+5.9
Protectionist	Robert Barbour	7,093	34.7	−12.5
Labour	Edward Hodges	1,358	6.6	+6.6
Total formal votes		20,469	96.8	
Informal votes		676	3.2	
Turnout		21,145	62.8	
Anti-Socialist hold		Swing	+9.2	

=== Laanecoorie ===
1906 Australian federal election: Laanecoorie
Party	Candidate	Votes	%	±%
Protectionist	Carty Salmon	5,204	37.5	−37.1
Labour	William Rowe	4,466	32.2	+32.2
Anti-Socialist	Walter Grose	4,206	30.3	+4.9
Total formal votes		13,876	94.0	
Informal votes		881	6.0	
Turnout		14,757	53.5	
Protectionist hold		Swing	−21.9	

=== Maribyrnong ===
1906 Australian federal election: Maribyrnong
Party	Candidate	Votes	%	±%
Protectionist	Samuel Mauger	11,109	56.9	
Labour	Clement Davidson	8,407	43.1	
Total formal votes		19,516	95.9	
Informal votes		839	4.1	
Turnout		20,355	60.9	
Protectionist win		(new seat)		

=== Melbourne ===
1906 Australian federal election: Melbourne
Party	Candidate	Votes	%	±%
Labour	William Maloney	9,228	60.4	+10.6
Ind. Protectionist	William Lormer	6,056	39.6	+39.6
Total formal votes		15,284	96.5	
Informal votes		561	3.5	
Turnout		15,845	51.0	
Labour hold		Swing	+10.6	

=== Melbourne Ports ===
1906 Australian federal election: Melbourne Ports
Party	Candidate	Votes	%	±%
Labour	James Mathews	6,813	40.6	−1.3
Protectionist	Edward Watts	5,932	35.4	−20.1
Independent Labour	James Ronald	3,215	19.2	+19.2
Ind. Anti-Socialist	Cyril James	802	4.8	+4.8
Total formal votes		16,762	95.9	
Informal votes		714	4.1	
Turnout		17,476	55.9	
Labour gain from Protectionist		Swing	+9.4	

=== Mernda ===
1906 Australian federal election: Mernda
Party	Candidate	Votes	%	±%
Protectionist	Robert Harper	5,306	36.5	−16.5
Labour	James Kenneally	3,962	27.2	+27.2
Anti-Socialist	John Leckie	3,753	25.8	−3.0
Ind. Protectionist	Richard O'Neill	1,534	10.5	+10.5
Total formal votes		14,555	95.4	
Informal votes		702	4.6	
Turnout		15,257	52.3	
Protectionist hold		Swing	−7.4	

=== Wannon ===
1906 Australian federal election: Wannon
Party	Candidate	Votes	%	±%
Labour	John McDougall	9,151	52.8	+15.2
Anti-Socialist	Arthur Robinson	8,179	47.2	+3.8
Total formal votes		17,330	96.3	
Informal votes		664	3.7	
Turnout		17,994	63.8	
Labour gain from Anti-Socialist		Swing	+5.7	

=== Wimmera ===
1906 Australian federal election: Wimmera
Party	Candidate	Votes	%	±%
Ind. Protectionist	Sydney Sampson	7,911	51.6	+14.6
Labour	Richard Taffe	3,554	23.2	+23.2
Ind. Anti-Socialist	Max Hirsch	2,002	13.0	+13.0
Ind. Protectionist	Herman Brauer	1,737	11.3	+11.3
Ind. Anti-Socialist	William Leslie	142	0.9	+0.9
Total formal votes		15,346	96.5	
Informal votes		560	3.5	
Turnout		15,906	57.0	
Ind. Protectionist gain from Protectionist		Swing	+14.6	

=== Yarra ===
1906 Australian federal election: Yarra
Party	Candidate	Votes	%	±%
Labour	Frank Tudor	8,591	58.3	−9.9
Ind. Protectionist	Richard Vale	5,776	39.2	+39.2
Independent Labour	George Roberts	358	2.4	+2.4
Total formal votes		14,725	96.9	
Informal votes		473	3.1	
Turnout		15,198	50.2	
Labour hold		Swing	−8.6	

== Queensland ==
1906 Australian federal election (Queensland)
← 1903	12 December 1906	1910 →

All 9 Queensland seats in the House of Representatives
- Registered: 271,109
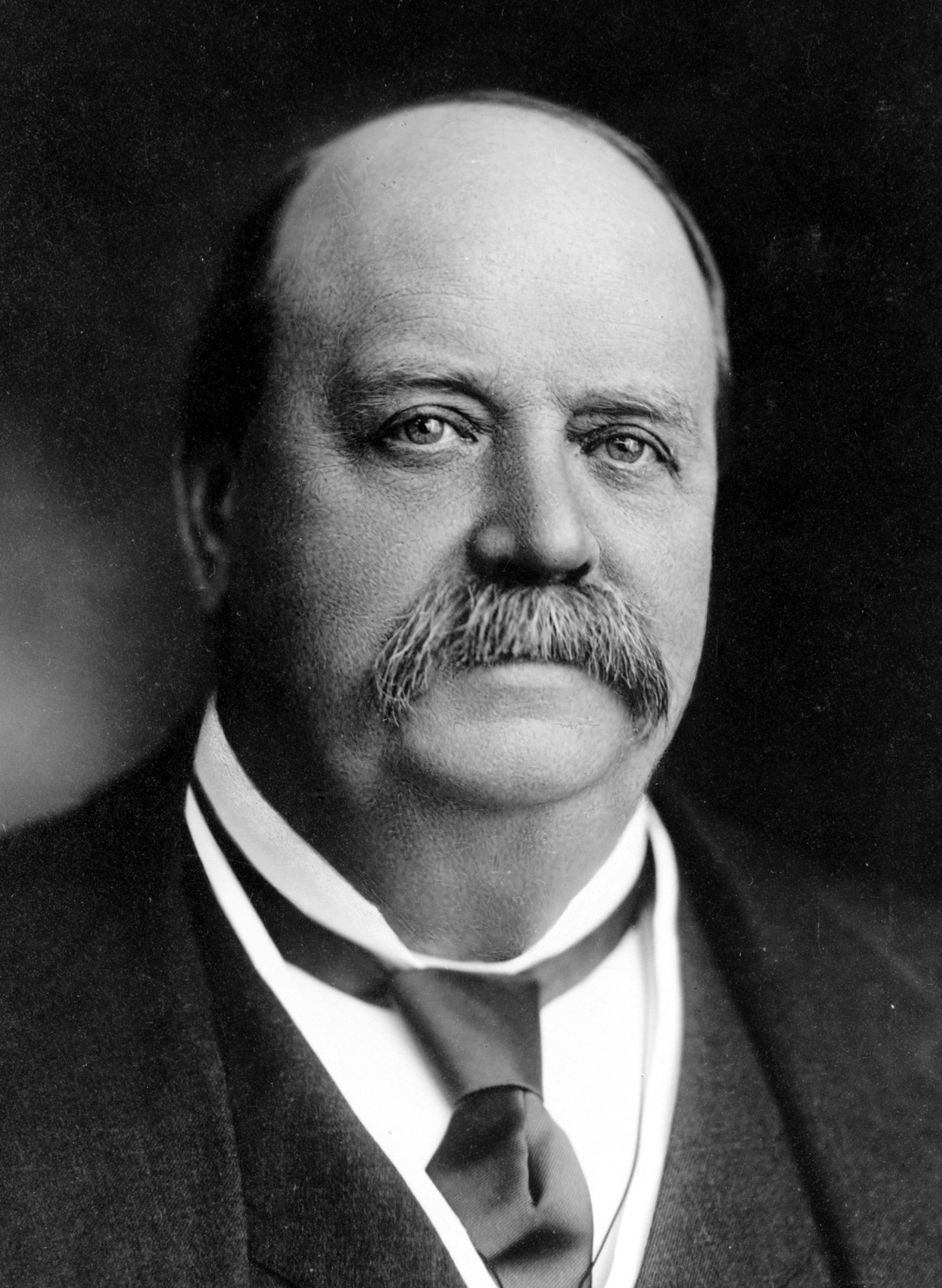

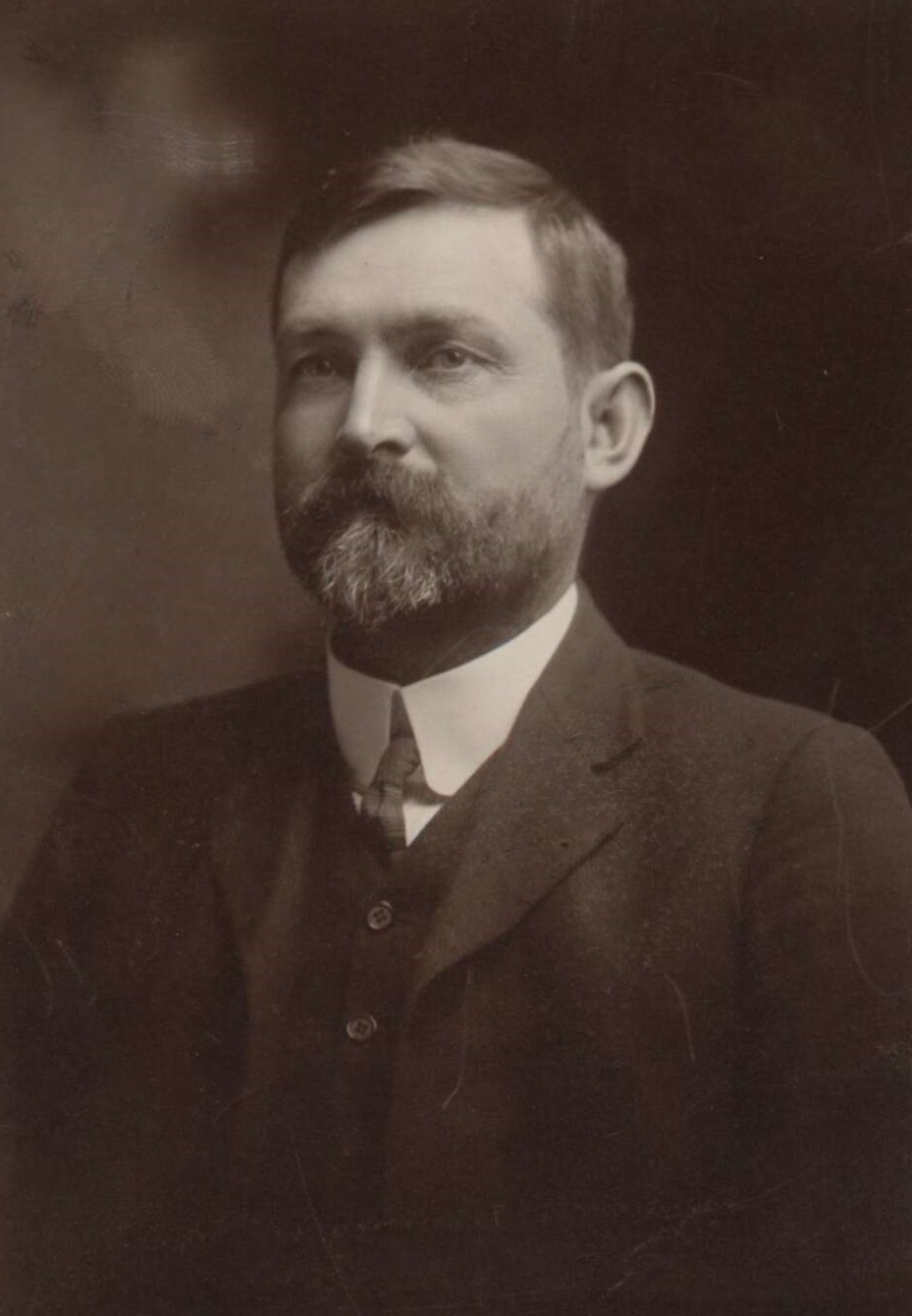

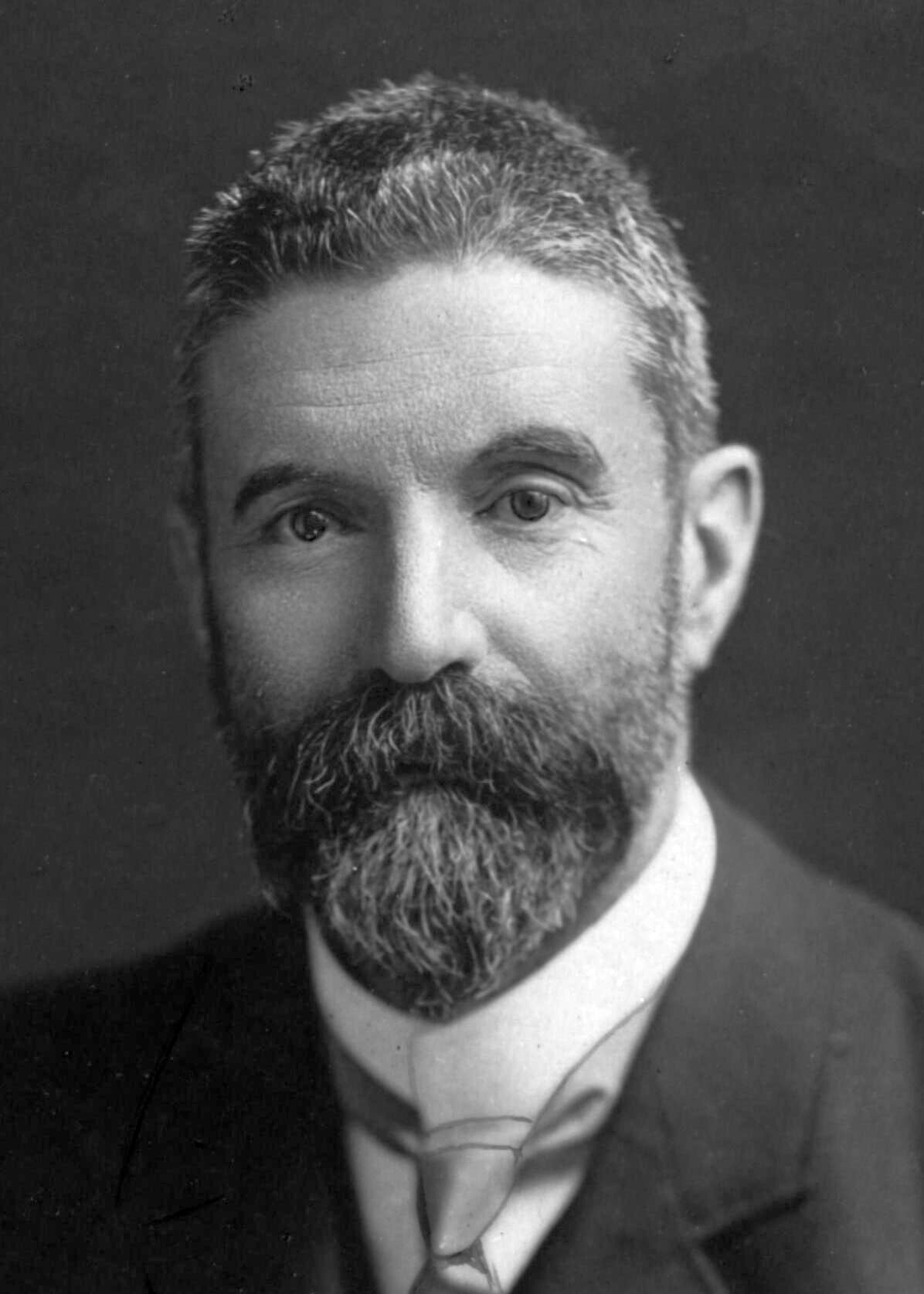
	First party	Second party	Third party
Leader	George Reid	Chris Watson	Alfred Deakin
Party	Anti-Socialist	Labour	Protectionist
Last election	—	6 seats	2 seats
Seats won	4	4	1
Seat change	▲4	▼2	▼1
Popular vote	60,599	51,231	7,440
Percentage	50.81%	42.95%	6.24%
Swing	—	▼7.58	▼33.31

=== Brisbane ===
1906 Australian federal election: Brisbane
Party	Candidate	Votes	%	±%
Anti-Socialist	Justin Foxton	8,200	61.3	+61.3
Labour	Millice Culpin	5,187	38.7	−8.1
Total formal votes		13,387	96.7	
Informal votes		455	3.3	
Turnout		13,842	39.7	
Anti-Socialist gain from Labour		Swing	+13.4	

=== Capricornia ===
1906 Australian federal election: Capricornia
Party	Candidate	Votes	%	±%
Anti-Socialist	Edward Archer	7,892	55.6	+25.1
Labour	David Thomson	6,304	44.4	−5.2
Total formal votes		14,196	96.4	
Informal votes		529	3.6	
Turnout		14,725	52.5	
Anti-Socialist gain from Labour		Swing	+15.2	

=== Darling Downs ===
1906 Australian federal election: Darling Downs
Party	Candidate	Votes	%	±%
Protectionist	Littleton Groom	7,440	65.1	−34.9
Anti-Socialist	Horace Ransome	3,991	34.9	+34.9
Total formal votes		11,431	95.9	
Informal votes		488	4.1	
Turnout		11,919	37.8	
Protectionist hold		Swing	−34.9	

=== Herbert ===
1906 Australian federal election: Herbert
Party	Candidate	Votes	%	±%
Labour	Fred Bamford	8,151	52.9	−4.9
Anti-Socialist	Walter Tunbridge	7,255	47.1	+47.1
Total formal votes		15,406	95.3	
Informal votes		764	4.7	
Turnout		16,170	50.8	
Labour hold		Swing	−4.9	

=== Kennedy ===
1906 Australian federal election: Kennedy
Party	Candidate	Votes	%	±%
Labour	Charles McDonald	6,462	57.8	−11.9
Anti-Socialist	Frederick Johnson	4,711	42.2	+11.9
Total formal votes		11,173	93.0	
Informal votes		845	7.0	
Turnout		12,018	48.4	
Labour hold		Swing	−11.9	

=== Maranoa ===
1906 Australian federal election: Maranoa
Party	Candidate	Votes	%	±%
Labour	Jim Page	6,599	68.8	−6.2
Anti-Socialist	Joseph Little	2,989	31.2	+6.2
Total formal votes		9,588	94.2	
Informal votes		593	5.8	
Turnout		10,181	41.2	
Labour hold		Swing	−6.2	

=== Moreton ===
1906 Australian federal election: Moreton
Party	Candidate	Votes	%	±%
Anti-Socialist	Hugh Sinclair	10,055	62.5	+18.3
Labour	James Wilkinson	6,038	37.5	+37.5
Total formal votes		16,093	96.9	
Informal votes		514	3.1	
Turnout		16,607	52.4	
Anti-Socialist gain from Independent Labour		Swing	+18.3	

=== Oxley ===
1906 Australian federal election: Oxley
Party	Candidate	Votes	%	±%
Anti-Socialist	Richard Edwards	8,722	66.6	+66.6
Labour	Alfred Merry	4,372	33.4	−14.3
Total formal votes		13,094	95.4	
Informal votes		635	4.6	
Turnout		13,729	39.7	
Anti-Socialist gain from Protectionist		Swing	+14.3	

=== Wide Bay ===
1906 Australian federal election: Wide Bay
Party	Candidate	Votes	%	±%
Labour	Andrew Fisher	8,118	54.5	−6.7
Anti-Socialist	Jasper Harvey	6,784	45.5	+6.7
Total formal votes		14,902	97.5	
Informal votes		389	2.5	
Turnout		15,291	52.7	
Labour hold		Swing	−6.7	

== South Australia ==
1906 Australian federal election (South Australia)
← 1903	12 December 1906	1910 →

All 7 South Australian seats in the House of Representatives
- Registered: 193,118
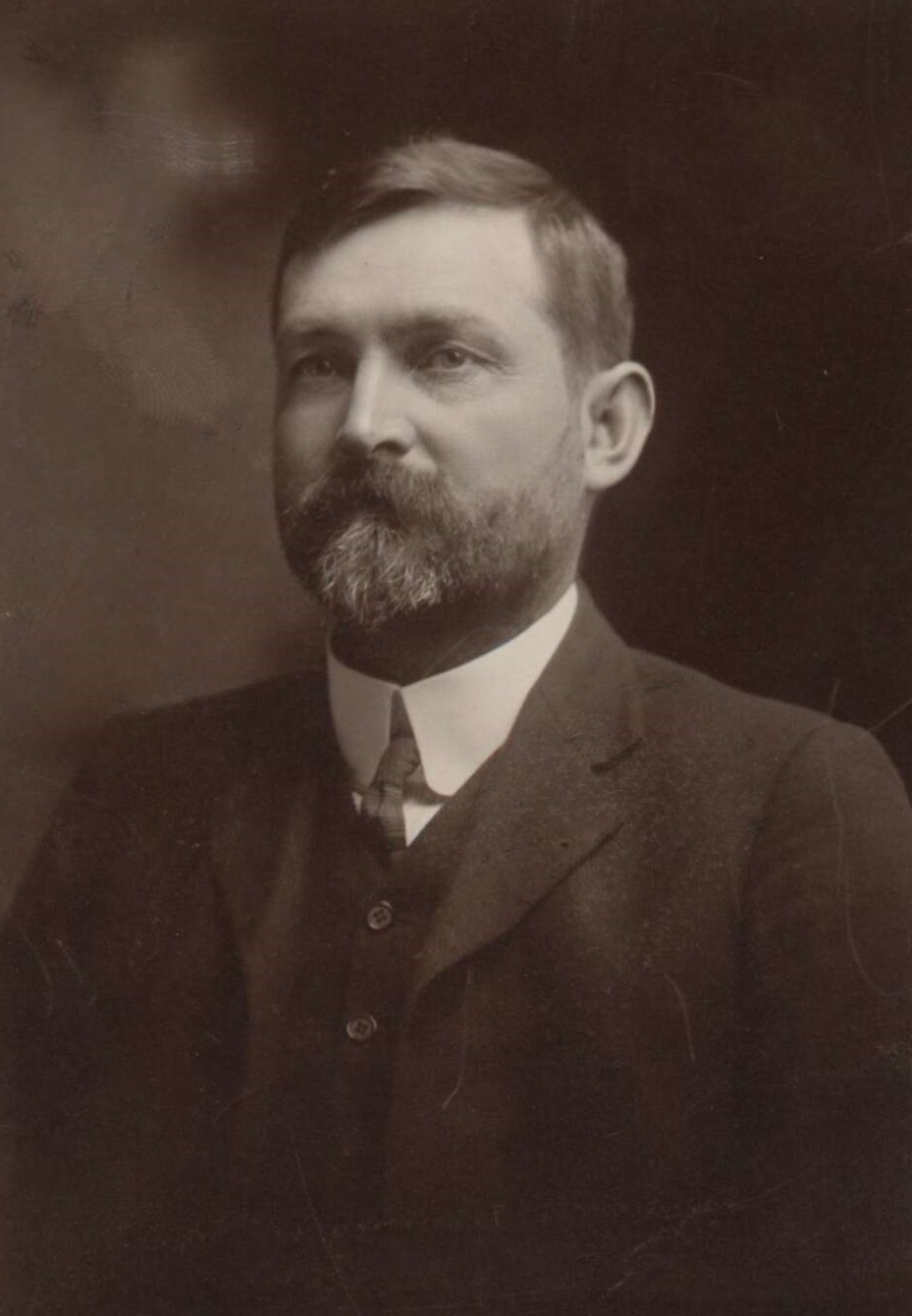

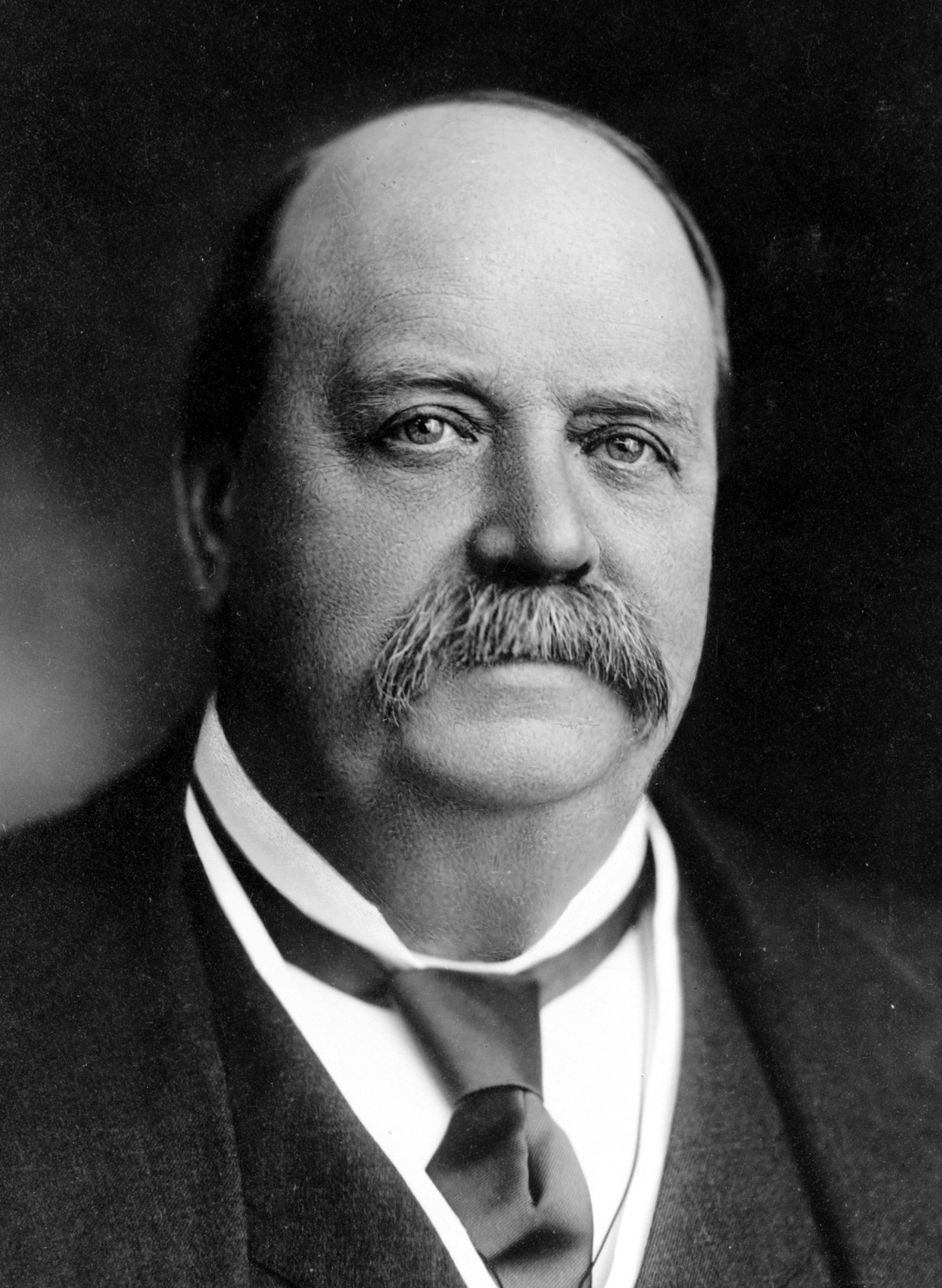

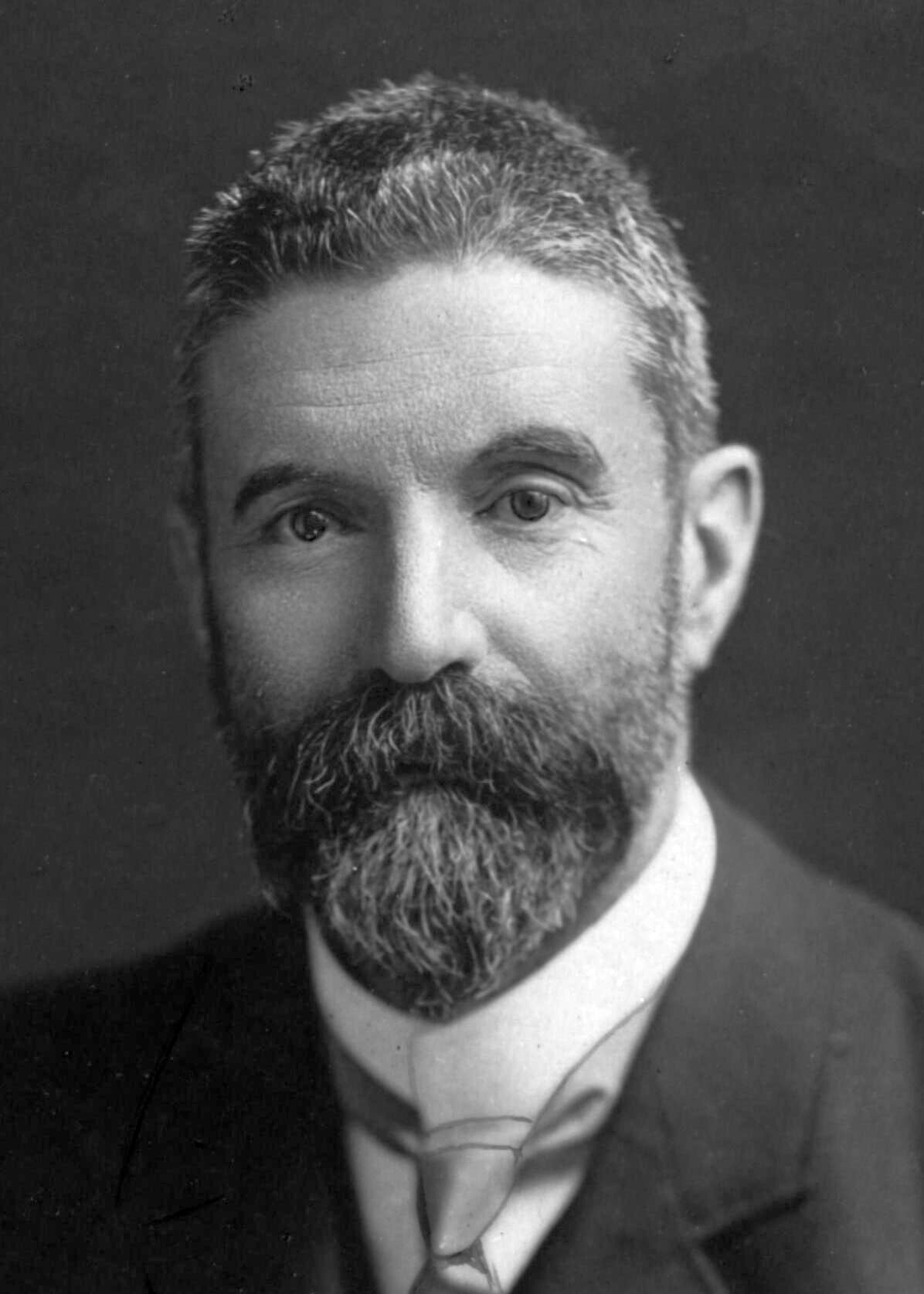
	First party	Second party	Third party
Leader	Chris Watson	George Reid	Alfred Deakin
Party	Labour	Anti-Socialist	Protectionist
Last election	2 seats	2 seats	2 seats
Seats won	3	2	1
Seat change	▲1	Steady	▼1
Popular vote	11,845	12,080	N/A
Percentage	38.34%	39.10%	N/A
Swing	▼21.81	▲14.57	—

=== Adelaide ===
1906 Australian federal election: Adelaide
Party	Candidate	Votes	%	±%
Protectionist	Charles Kingston	unopposed		
Protectionist hold		Swing		

=== Angas ===
1906 Australian federal election: Angas
Party	Candidate	Votes	%	±%
Anti-Socialist	Paddy Glynn	5,546	63.6	−36.4
Labour	Alexander Day	3,177	36.4	+36.4
Total formal votes		8,273	94.5	
Informal votes		503	5.5	
Turnout		9,226	34.1	
Anti-Socialist hold		Swing	−36.4	

=== Barker ===
1906 Australian federal election: Barker
Party	Candidate	Votes	%	±%
Anti-Socialist	John Livingston	6,534	58.1	+58.1
Labour	Roland Campbell	4,715	41.9	+41.9
Total formal votes		11,249	95.3	
Informal votes		559	4.7	
Turnout		11,808	44.2	
Anti-Socialist gain from Protectionist		Swing	+58.1	

=== Boothby ===
1906 Australian federal election: Boothby
Party	Candidate	Votes	%	±%
Labour	Lee Batchelor	unopposed		
Labour hold		Swing		

=== Grey ===
1906 Australian federal election: Grey
Party	Candidate	Votes	%	±%
Labour	Alexander Poynton	unopposed		
Labour gain from Anti-Socialist		Swing		

=== Hindmarsh ===
1906 Australian federal election: Hindmarsh
Party	Candidate	Votes	%	±%
Labour	James Hutchison	unopposed		
Labour hold		Swing		

=== Wakefield ===
1906 Australian federal election: Wakefield
Party	Candidate	Votes	%	±%
Independent	Sir Frederick Holder	6,972	63.8	−36.2
Labour	John Vaughan	3,953	36.2	+36.2
Total formal votes		10,925	95.1	
Informal votes		560	4.9	
Turnout		11,485	41.7	
Independent hold		Swing	−36.2	

== Western Australia ==
1906 Australian federal election (Western Australia)
← 1903	12 December 1906	1910 →

All 5 Western Australian seats in the House of Representatives
- Registered: 145,473
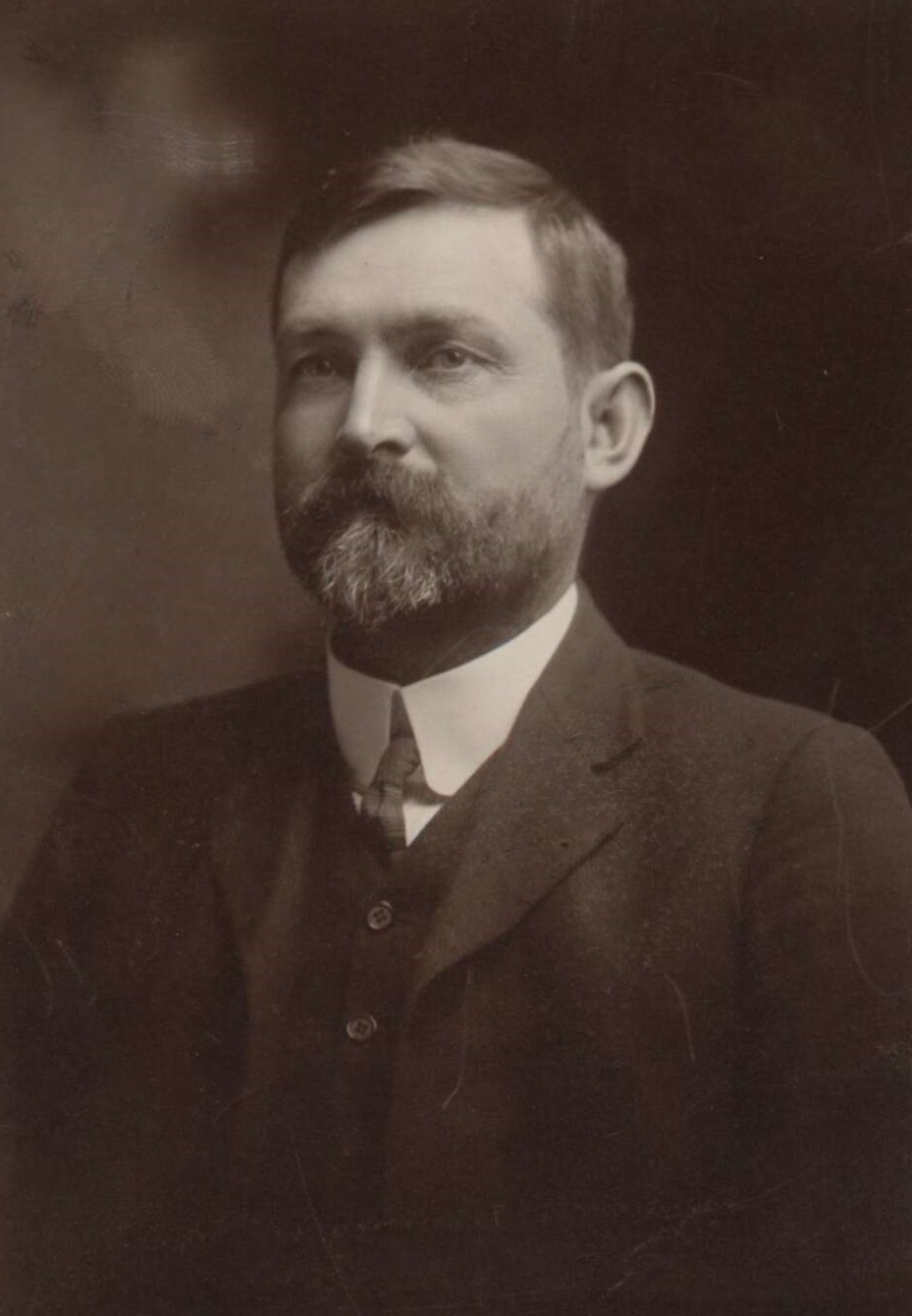

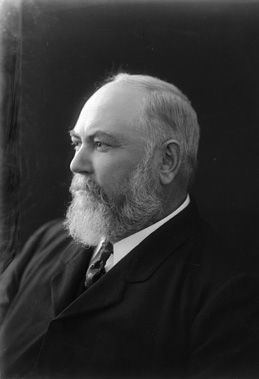
	First party	Second party
Leader	Chris Watson	John Forrest
Party	Labour	Western Australian
Last election	4 seats	—
Seats won	3	2
Seat change	▼1	▲2
Popular vote	28,334	22,154
Percentage	56.12%	43.88
Swing	▼10.80	—

=== Coolgardie ===
1906 Australian federal election: Coolgardie
Party	Candidate	Votes	%	±%
Labour	Hugh Mahon	6,806	73.1	−26.9
Western Australian	John Archibald	2,503	26.9	+26.9
Total formal votes		9,309	96.1	
Informal votes		376	3.9	
Turnout		9,685	33.3	
Labour hold		Swing	−26.9	

=== Fremantle ===
1906 Australian federal election: Fremantle
Party	Candidate	Votes	%	±%
Western Australian	William Hedges	4,798	50.9	+12.2
Labour	William Carpenter	4,629	49.1	−12.2
Total formal votes		9,427	92.9	
Informal votes		718	7.1	
Turnout		10,145	37.5	
Western Australian gain from Labour		Swing	+12.2	

=== Kalgoorlie ===
1906 Australian federal election: Kalgoorlie
Party	Candidate	Votes	%	±%
Labour	Charlie Frazer	7,715	79.0	+12.4
Western Australian	William Burton	2,051	21.0	−12.4
Total formal votes		9,766	96.7	
Informal votes		338	3.3	
Turnout		10,104	36.2	
Labour hold		Swing	+12.4	

=== Perth ===
1906 Australian federal election: Perth
Party	Candidate	Votes	%	±%
Labour	James Fowler	4,892	52.7	−20.1
Western Australian	Edward Thurstan	4,384	47.3	+20.1
Total formal votes		9,276	96.7	
Informal votes		343	3.6	
Turnout		9,619	30.0	
Labour hold		Swing	−20.1	

=== Swan ===
1906 Australian federal election: Swan
Party	Candidate	Votes	%	±%
Western Australian	Sir John Forrest	8,418	66.2	−33.8
Labour	Peter O'Loghlen	4,292	33.8	+33.8
Total formal votes		12,710	96.6	
Informal votes		453	3.4	
Turnout		13,163	45.0	
Western Australian hold		Swing	−33.8	

== Tasmania ==
1906 Australian federal election (Tasmania)
← 1903	12 December 1906	1910 →

All 5 Tasmanian seats in the House of Representatives
- Registered: 90,209
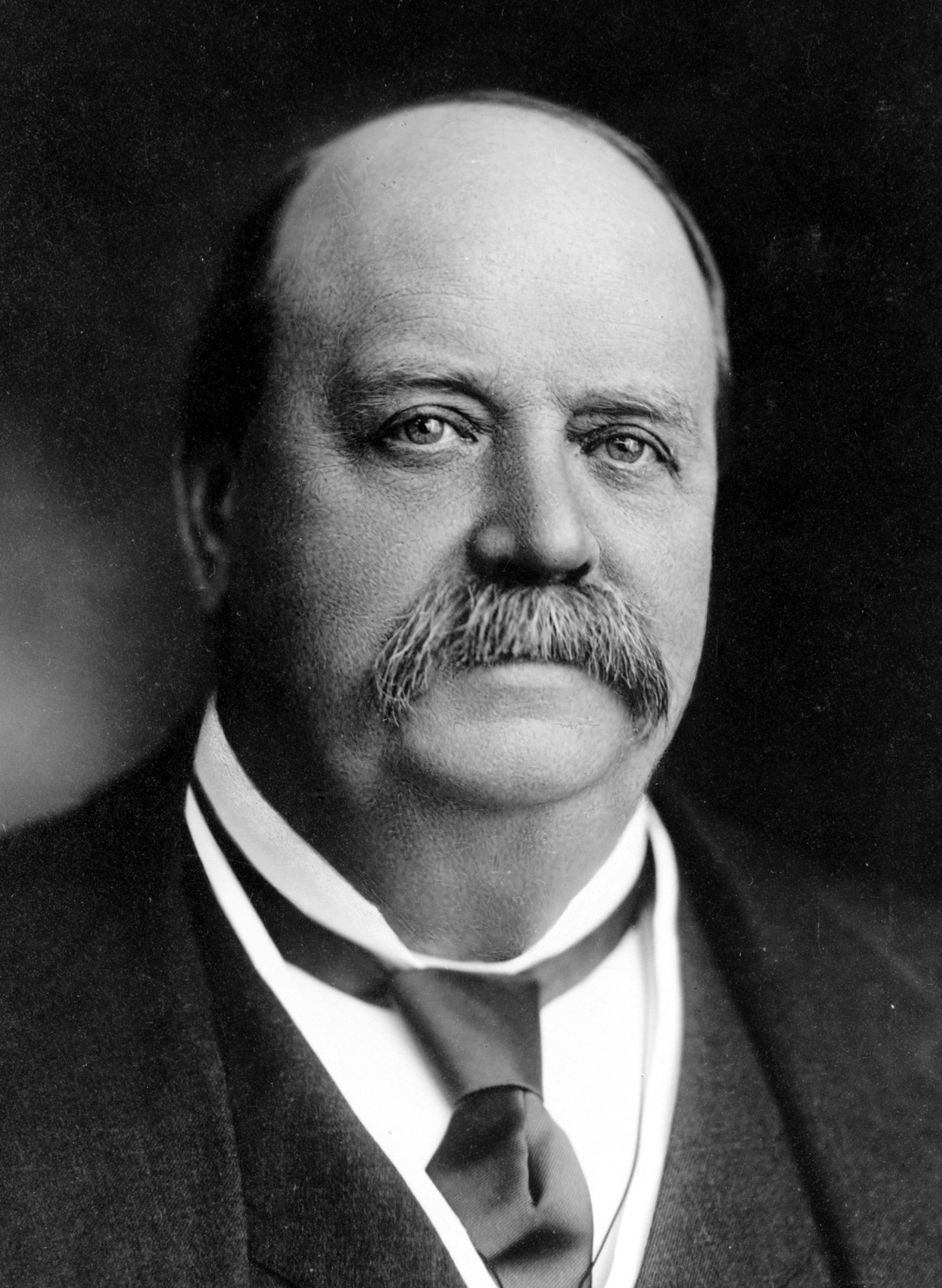

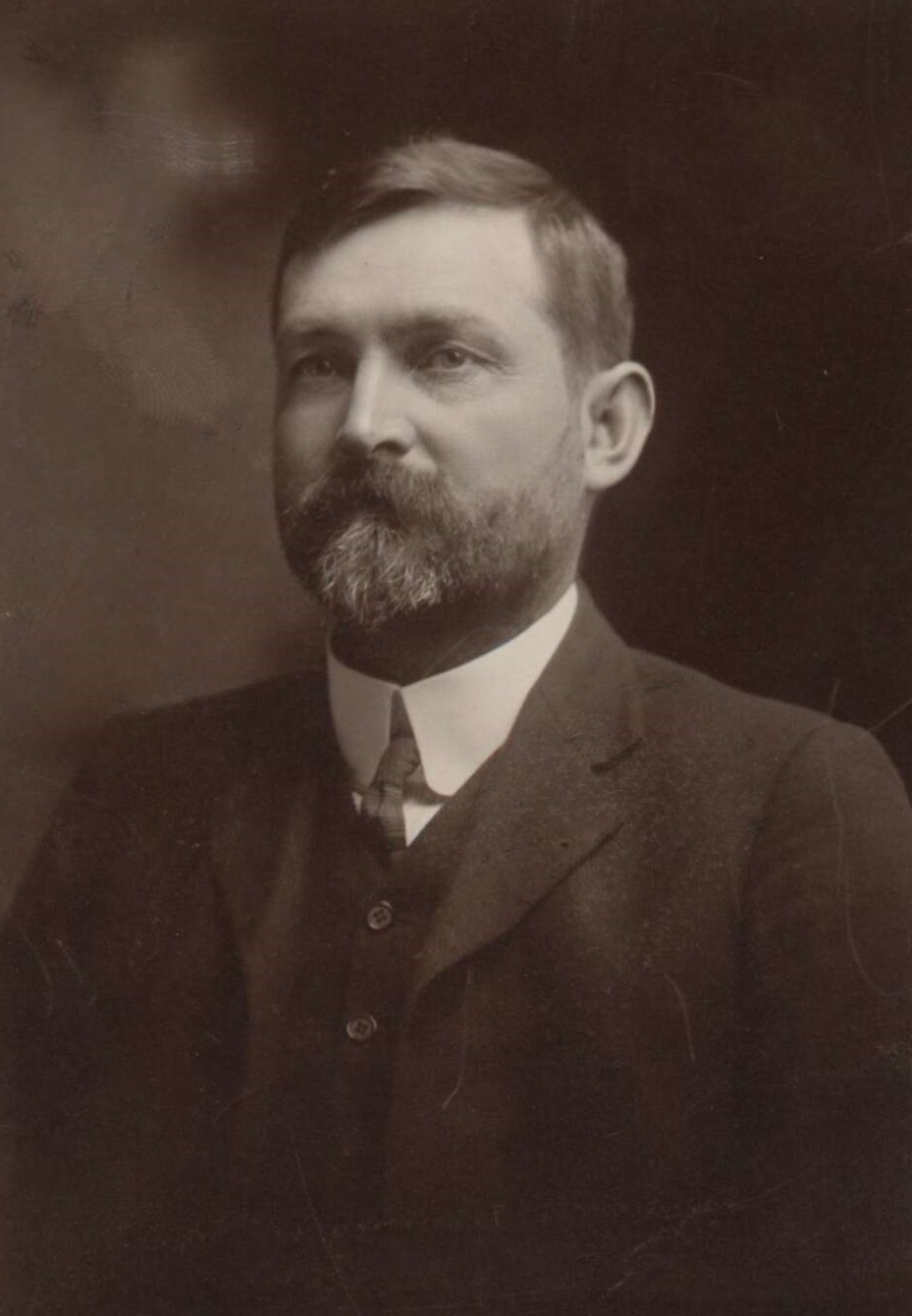

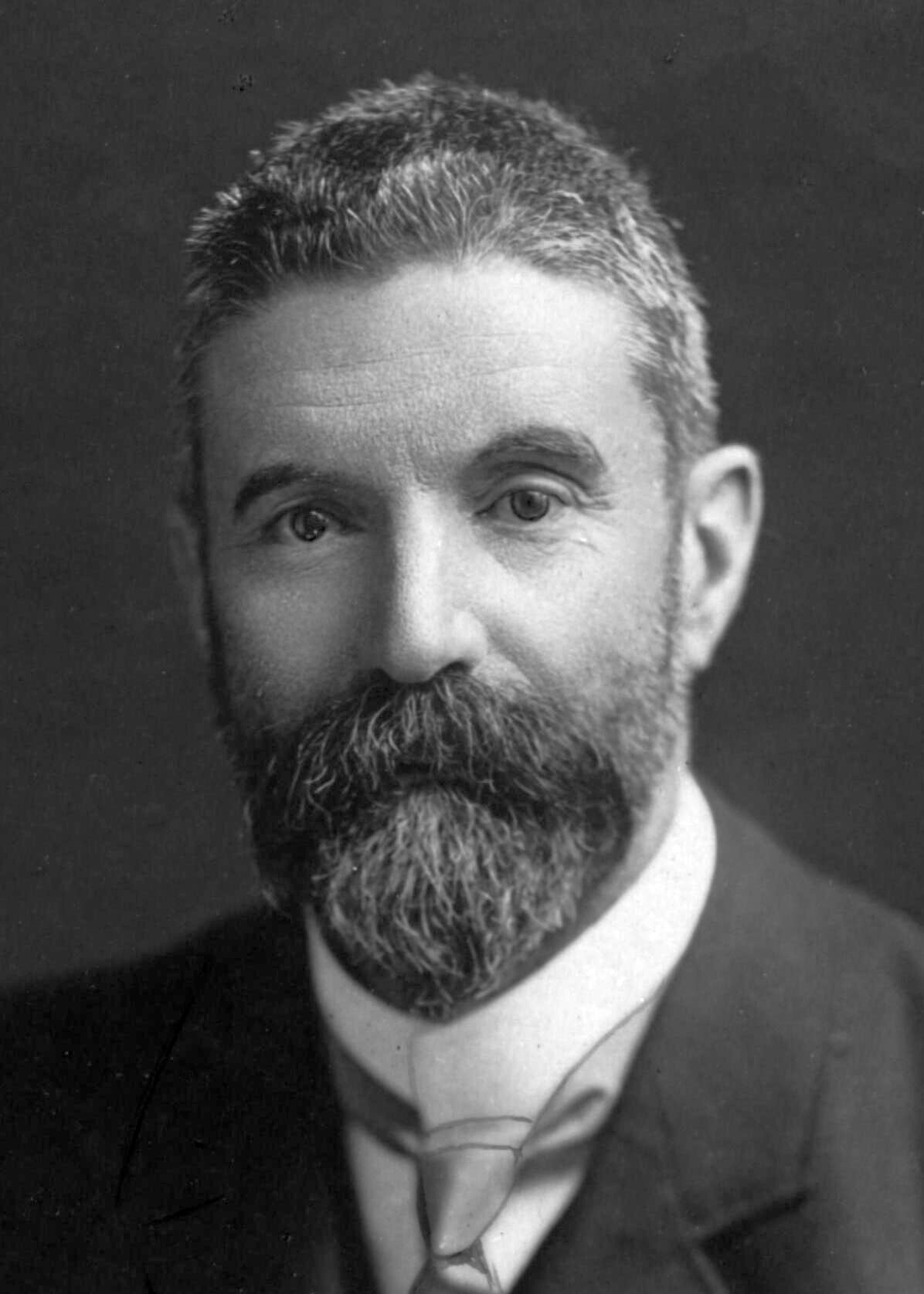
	First party	Second party	Third party
Leader	George Reid	Chris Watson	Alfred Deakin
Party	Anti-Socialist	Labour	Protectionist
Last election	1 seat	1 seat	2 seats
Seats won	3	1	1
Seat change	▲2	Steady	▼1
Popular vote	17,350	12,585	6,336
Percentage	44.93%	32.59%	16.41%
Swing	▲12.71	▲20.08	▼24.96

=== Bass ===
1906 Australian federal election: Bass
Party	Candidate	Votes	%	±%
Protectionist	David Storrer	5,826	62.3	+5.6
Anti-Socialist	William Oldham	3,522	37.7	−5.6
Total formal votes		9,348	96.1	
Informal votes		380	3.9	
Turnout		9,728	52.2	
Protectionist hold		Swing	+5.6	

=== Darwin ===
1906 Australian federal election: Darwin
Party	Candidate	Votes	%	±%
Labour	King O'Malley	5,215	55.0	+4.6
Anti-Socialist	William Lamerton	3,420	36.0	+36.0
Ind. Anti-Socialist	Henry Bannister	849	8.9	+8.9
Total formal votes		9,484	95.8	
Informal votes		420	4.2	
Turnout		9,904	55.3	
Labour hold		Swing	+8.8	

=== Denison ===
1906 Australian federal election: Denison
Party	Candidate	Votes	%	±%
Anti-Socialist	Sir Philip Fysh	6,473	58.5	+15.1
Labour	George Burns	4,165	37.6	+37.6
Ind. Protectionist	William Brown	434	3.9	+3.9
Total formal votes		11,071	96.6	
Informal votes		391	3.4	
Turnout		11,462	60.0	
Anti-Socialist gain from Protectionist		Swing	+15.1	

=== Franklin ===
1906 Australian federal election: Franklin
Party	Candidate	Votes	%	±%
Anti-Socialist	William McWilliams	unopposed		
Anti-Socialist gain from Revenue Tariff		Swing		

=== Wilmot ===
1906 Australian federal election: Wilmot
Party	Candidate	Votes	%	±%
Anti-Socialist	Llewellyn Atkinson	3,935	45.2	−9.7
Labour	Thomas Wilson	3,205	36.8	+36.8
Ind. Anti-Socialist	Norman Cameron	1,058	12.1	+12.1
Protectionist	Charles Fenton	510	5.9	−39.2
Total formal votes		8,708	95.7	
Informal votes		392	4.3	
Turnout		9,100	53.7	
Anti-Socialist hold		Swing	−0.7	

== See also ==
- 1906 Australian federal election
- Candidates of the 1906 Australian federal election
- Members of the Australian House of Representatives, 1906–1910
- Members of the Australian Senate, 1907–1910
- Results of the 1906 Australian federal election (Senate)
