= 1906 Australian Senate election =

- 12 December 1906

18 of the 36 seats in the Senate 18 seats needed for a majority
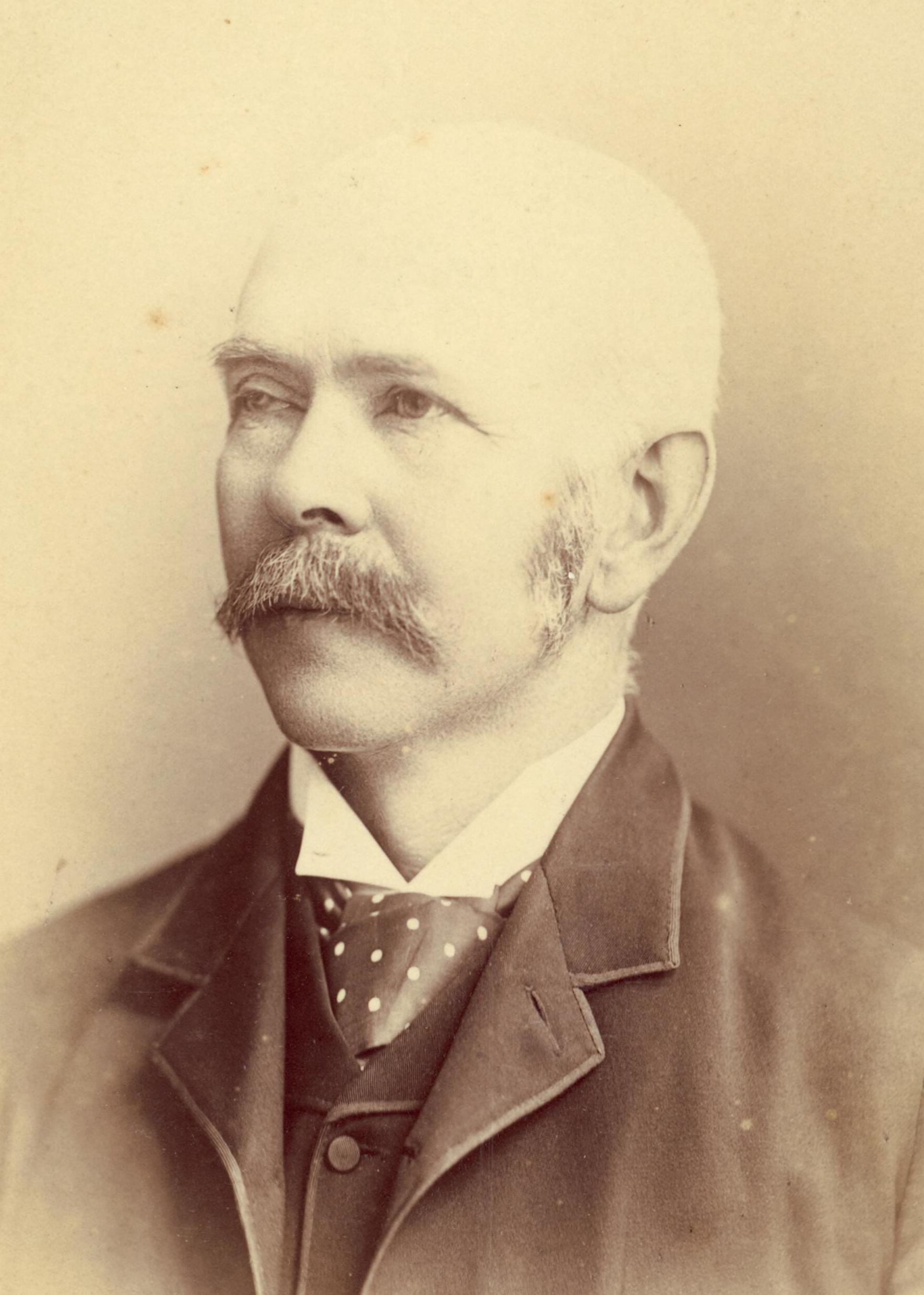

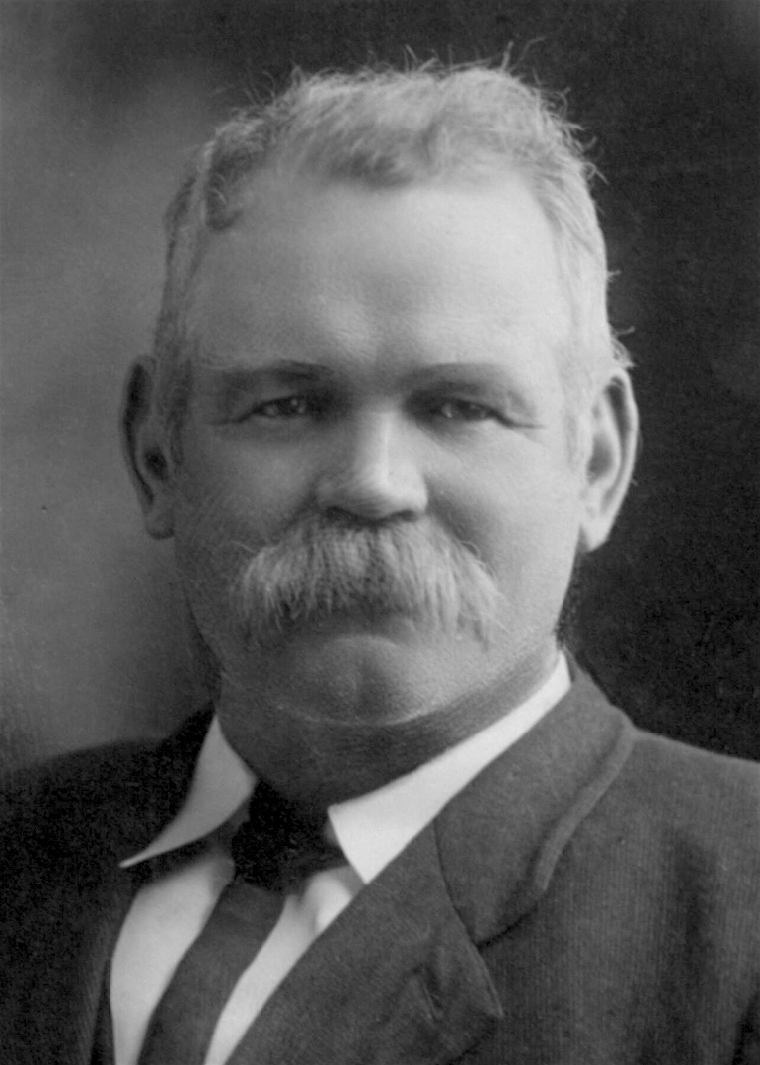

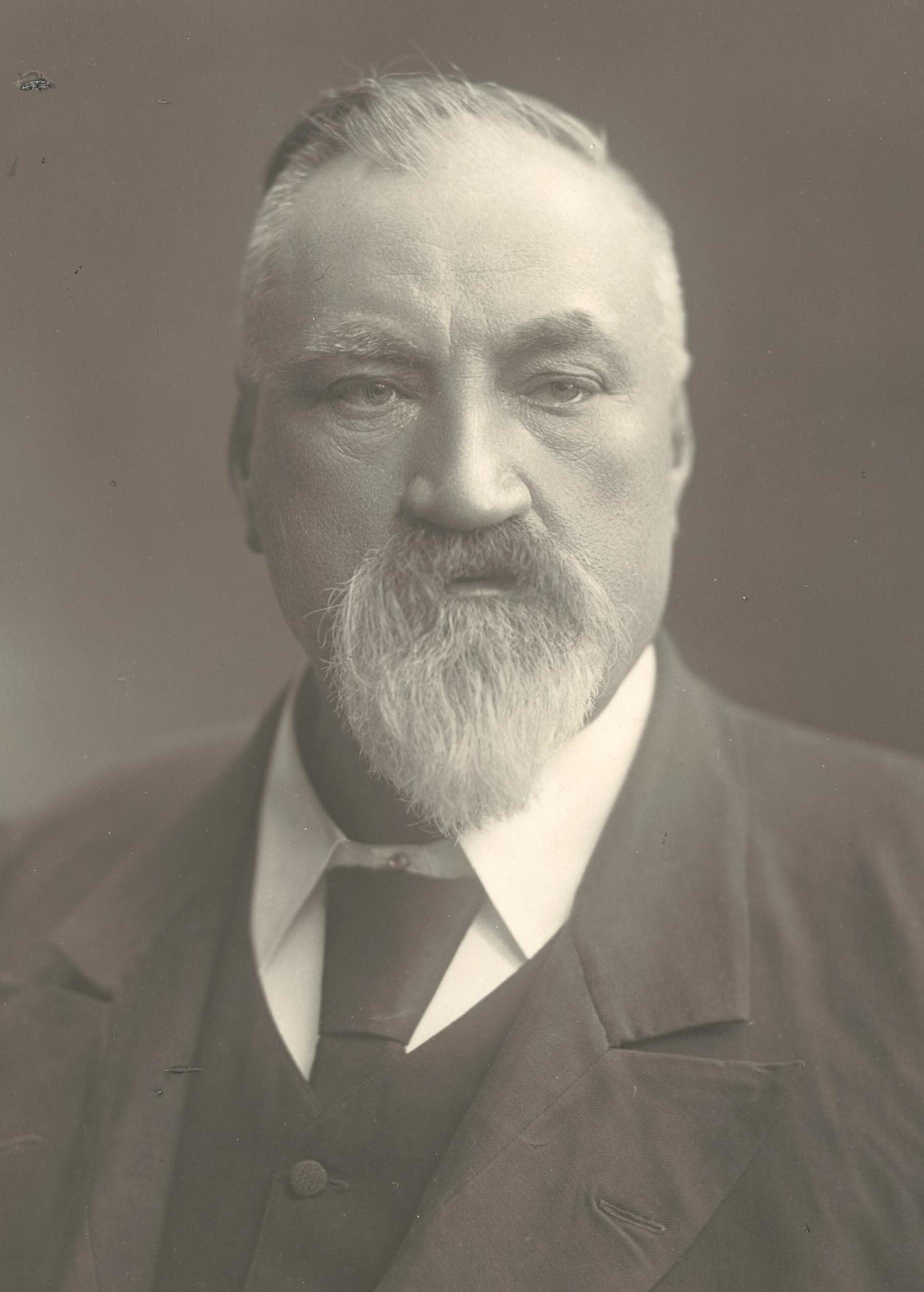
	First party	Second party	Third party
Leader	Josiah Symon	Gregor McGregor	Tom Playford
Party	Free Trade	Labor	Protectionist
Leader's seat	South Australia	South Australia	South Australia
Seats before	13	14	8
Seats won	12	5	1
Seats after	17	15	3
Seat change	▲4	▲1	▼5
Popular vote	469,917	384,171	92,931
Percentage	47.4%	38.7%	9.4%
Swing	▲12.2pp	▲11.4pp	▼8.1pp

The Australian states each elected three members of the Australian Senate at the 1906 federal election to serve a six-year term starting on 1 January 1907.

== Australia ==
Senate 1906–10 (FPTP BV) – Turnout 50.21% (Non-CV) – Informal 93.6
Party	Votes	%	Swing	Seats won	Seats held	Change
Anti-Socialist (Note: The figures for the Anti-Socialist Party include Joseph Vardon (SA), whose election was subsequently declared void, and Henry Dobson (Tas), who was elected as part of the Revenue Tariff Party.)	469,917	47.4	+12.2	12	17	▲4
Labour	384,171	38.7	+11.4	5	15	▲1
Protectionist	92,931	9.4	−8.1	1	3	▼5
Western Australian Party	24,353	2.5				
Socialist Labor	12,546	1.3	−1.1			
Independents/Other (Note: Independent: William Trenwith (Vic))	7,942	0.8		0	1	Steady
Total	991,850			18	36	
Invalid/blank votes	67,318	6.4	–5.2			
Turnout	1,059,168	50.2				
Registered voters	2,109,562					
Source: Psephos: 1906 Senate

== New South Wales ==
Each elector voted for up to three candidates. Percentages refer to the number of voters rather than the number of votes.

1906 Australian federal election: Senate, New South Wales
Party	Candidate	Votes	%	±%
Anti-Socialist	Albert Gould (re-elected 1)	197,663	55.9	
Anti-Socialist	James Walker (re-elected 2)	194,335	55.0	
Anti-Socialist	Edward Millen (re-elected 3)	191,353	54.2	
Labour	Allan McDougall	148,728	42.1	
Labour	George Clark	146,997	41.6	
Labour	Greg McGirr	138,592	39.2	
Socialist Labor	James Moroney	15,941	4.5	
Socialist Labor	Thomas Batho	14,316	4.1	
Socialist Labor	John Willcox	12,035	3.4	
Total formal votes		1,059,960; 353,320 voters	92.7	−2.4
Informal votes		28,016	7.3	+2.4
Turnout		381,336	51.7	+4.5
Party total votes
Anti-Socialist		583,351	55.0	
Labour		434,317	41.0	
Socialist Labor		42,292	4.0	

== Queensland ==
Each elector voted for up to three candidates. Percentages refer to the number of voters rather than the number of votes.

1906 Australian federal election: Senate, Queensland
Party	Candidate	Votes	%	±%
Anti-Socialist	Thomas Chataway (elected 1)	60,738	51.8	
Anti-Socialist	Robert Sayers (elected 2)	58,824	50.2	
Anti-Socialist	Anthony St Ledger (elected 3)	57,687	49.2	
Labour	William Higgs (defeated)	54,176	46.2	
Labour	James Griffith	46,805	39.9	
Labour	Jens Lundager	46,584	39.7	
Independent Labour	Anderson Dawson (defeated)	26,771	22.8	
Total formal votes		351,585; 117,195 voters	94.1	
Informal votes		7,344	5.9	
Turnout		124,539	45.9	
Party total votes
Anti-Socialist		177,249	50.4	
Labour		147,565	42.0	
Independent Labour		26,771	7.6	

== South Australia ==
Each elector voted for up to three candidates. Percentages refer to the number of voters rather than the number of votes.

1906 Australian federal election: Senate, South Australia
Party	Candidate	Votes	%	±%
Anti-Socialist	Sir Josiah Symon (re-elected 1)	33,597	49.6	
Labour	William Russell (elected 2)	31,796	46.9	
Anti-Socialist	Joseph Vardon (elected 3) (Note: The election of Anti-Socialist senator Joseph Vardon was declared void on 31 May 1907.)	31,489	46.5	
Labour	Dugald Crosby	31,455	46.4	
Labour	Reginald Blundell	31,366	46.3	
Anti-Socialist	David Charleston	30,608	45.2	
Protectionist	Thomas Playford (defeated)	13,035	19.2	
Total formal votes		203,346; 67,782 voters	96.1	−1.7
Informal votes		2,735	3.9	+1.7
Turnout		70,517	36.5	
Party total votes
Anti-Socialist		95,684	47.1	
Labour		94,617	46.5	
Protectionist		13,035	6.4	

== Tasmania ==
Each elector voted for up to three candidates. Percentages refer to the number of voters rather than the number of votes.

1906 Australian federal election: Senate, Tasmania
Party	Candidate	Votes	%	±%
Anti-Socialist	Cyril Cameron (elected 1)	25,089	53.7	
Anti-Socialist	John Clemons (re-elected 2)	24,844	51.1	
Protectionist	John Keating (re-elected 3)	23,862	51.1	
Anti-Socialist	Norman Ewing	23,390	50.1	
Labour	David O'Keefe (defeated)	22,128	47.4	
Labour	James Guy	20,748	44.4	
Total formal votes		140,061; 46,687 voters	95.5	
Informal votes		2,192	4.5	
Turnout		48,879	54.2	
Party total votes
Anti-Socialist		73,323	52.4	
Labour		42,876	30.6	
Protectionist		23,862	17.0	

== Victoria ==
Each elector voted for up to three candidates. Percentages refer to the number of voters rather than the number of votes.

1906 Australian federal election: Senate, Victoria
Party	Candidate	Votes	%	±%
Anti-Socialist	Sir Simon Fraser (re-elected 1)	188,299	52.6	
Anti-Socialist	James McColl (elected 2)	185,906	52.0	
Labour	Edward Russell (elected 3)	131,500	36.8	
Labour	Tom Tunnecliffe	131,071	36.6	
Protectionist	James Styles (defeated)	116,599	32.6	
Anti-Socialist	Thomas Skene	105,929	29.6	
Labour	Stephen Barker	88,511	24.7	
Protectionist	Alexander Ramsay	87,385	24.4	
Protectionist	Charles Atkins	37,912	10.6	
Total formal votes		1,073,112; 357,704 voters	93.8	−4.0
Informal votes		23,481	6.2	+4.0
Turnout		381,185	56.7	+5.5
Party total votes
Anti-Socialist		480,134	44.7	
Labour		351,082	32.7	
Protectionist		241,896	22.5	

== Western Australia ==
Each elector voted for up to three candidates. Percentages refer to the number of voters rather than the number of votes.

1906 Australian federal election: Senate, Western Australia
Party	Candidate	Votes	%	±%
Labour	George Pearce (re-elected 1)	28,852	58.7	
Labour	Ted Needham (elected 2)	26,938	54.8	
Labour	Patrick Lynch (elected 3)	26,270	47.0	
Western Australian Party	Henry Mills	23,121	47.0	
Western Australian Party	Charles Clarke	21,540	43.8	
Western Australian Party	Edward Wittenoom	20,765	42.2	
Total formal votes		147,486; 49,162 voters	93.3	
Informal votes		3,550	6.7	
Turnout		52,712	36.2	
Party total votes
Labour		82,060	55.6	
Western Australian Party		65,426	44.4	

== See also ==
- Candidates of the 1906 Australian federal election
- Results of the 1906 Australian federal election (House of Representatives)
- Members of the Australian Senate, 1907–1910
