= Thomas Glass (Australian politician) =

Australian politician

The Honourable Thomas Glass
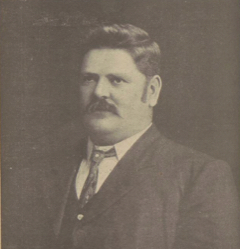

Member of the Victorian Legislative Assembly for Bendigo East
- In office 1 March 1907 – 1 May 1911
- Preceded by: Alfred Shrapnell Bailes
- Succeeded by: Alfred Thomas Hampson

Personal details
- Born: Missing required parameter 1=month! 1864 Geelong, Victoria
- Died: 17 May 1911 (aged 46–47) Melbourne, Victoria, Australia
- Resting place: Back Creek Cemetery, Bendigo
- Party: Labor Party
- Spouse: Kate Pratt Hall (m. 1907)
- Occupation: Storeman, Librarian, Politician

Thomas Glass (c. 1864 – 17 May 1911) was an Australian politician and Chief President of the Australian Natives Association.

== Early years ==
Born in Geelong to police sergeant William Glass and Eliza Ann Dalton, the family moved to Bendigo when he was 10 years old. He continued his education at the Gravel Hill and Central State School, Bendigo. After leaving school he was briefly employed by Gratton & Stamp, stock and station agents. He then spent many years as a storeman in the Sandhurst grocery business of his uncle, Albert Bush. While he was offered a clerks position he stated a preference for the physical exercise entailed in the duties of a storeman. He eventually took up the position of librarian and secretary of the Bendigo Mechanics Institute.

He took an active interest in community activities and societies. He was a member of the Sandhurst Ethiopian Serenade and Minstrel Troupe. It raised thousands of pounds for charities. He took an interest in Friendly Societies and had a close association with the Bendigo United Friendly Societies Dispensary. He was the prime mover in reorganising its finance when this was needed, making it debt free.

Glass was also an active member of the St Paul's Anglican Church and Sunday school. He was active in the Diocese and was a participant in positioning Bendigo in its operation from the Melbourne Diocese.

He was personable, a raconteur and a reciter and often gave service in the Northern Region for religious and charitable objectives.

== Australian Natives' Association ==
Glass became a member of the Sandhurst (later Bendigo) ANA branch No.5 in about 1885. He was an active member of his local ANA branch, and represented his branch as a delegate at several annual conferences. He was elected to the ANA Board at the 1900 conference. He was elected chief president of ANA at Queenscliff Annual Conference in 1905. Glass is one of seven members of Bendigo branch to have achieved the office of Chief President of ANA.

As Chief President he presided over the 1906 Annual Conference at Shepparton in which it was reported that Melbourne's Friendly Societies Gardens had been surrendered to the Government due to difficulties paying for the upkeep of the gardens, as the terms of the lease precludied sub-leasing of some of the land. The Friendly Societies Gardens were located on the banks of the Yarra on Swan Street near Jolimont Road, Melbourne. There was also a successful proposal that the conference recommends to all Municipalities the establishment of swimming baths in order to teach children to swim. It was reported at the Shepparton Annual Conference that ANA had requested the Government to appoint a curator at the National Park at Wilson's Promontory to protect and restore the native flora and fauna there.

== Politics ==
Glass joined the Labor Party who were quickly impressed with his oratorial and other skills and he was soon considered a candidate for election. He was a Labor candidate for the 1900 Victorian elections, barely losing to Alfred Bailey by 32 votes. Next, he stood as a candidate for the 1906 Federal election for the seat of Bendigo, losing again to opponent John Quick. In 1907, he was elected to the Victorian Legislative Assembly as the Labor member for Bendigo East, serving until 1 May 1911.

Glass was an ardent supporter of Federation.

After he became blind in March 1911, his wife represented him at a Referendum Meeting at Bendigo Town Hall.

Glass resigned from Parliament on 1 May 1911, just over 2 weeks before his death in Melbourne on 17 May 1911.

== Later years ==
On 12 June 1907 he married Kate Pratt Hall.

Glass developed ongoing and unexplained health issues culminating in his death at the age of 46 on 17 May 1911. A late stage brain tumour was diagnosed and successfully operated on, but he was so weakened at this stage that he couldn't recover.
