= Western Australian Party =

Former Western Australian political party

The Western Australian Party (or West Australian Party; WAP) was a short-lived Australian political party that operated in 1906. It was intended as a liberal party to protect the rights of Western Australians and to oppose the increasingly successful Labor Party, and drew its supporters from the Protectionist Party and the Anti-Socialist Party. John Forrest, a minister in Alfred Deakin's government, accepted the leadership of the party. Candidates were endorsed for all electorates in the 1906 federal election, including Forrest, but by the time of the election enthusiasm for the venture had waned. The party elected Forrest in Swan and William Hedges in Fremantle.

Forrest and Hedges did not sit together in federal parliament; Forrest continued to serve as a minister in the Protectionist government of Alfred Deakin while Hedges sat on the opposition benches as an Anti-Socialist.

== Background ==
The 1903 federal election saw the Australian Labor Party (ALP) win all three Senate seats in Western Australia and every House of Representatives seat except that held by federal government minister and former premier John Forrest.

In the lead-up to the next federal election, there were calls for an anti-Labor organisation to be created. In September 1906, the Senate rejected a bill authorising a survey of the route for the planned Trans-Australian Railway, which would connect Western Australia to the eastern states and had been a major reason for Western Australians voting to federate in 1901. The rejection of the bill prompted "a wave of anti-federal feeling" in Western Australia, with liberals seeking to capitalise on this sentiment to organise a new anti-Labor party.
