= Electoral results for the district of Mount Ommaney =

Queensland, Australia, district election results

This is a list of electoral results for the electoral district of Mount Ommaney in Queensland state elections.

== Members for Mount Ommaney ==
| Member | Party | Term |
|---|---|---|
| Peter Pyke | Labor | 1992–1995 |
| Bob Harper | Liberal | 1995–1998 |
| Julie Attwood | Labor | 1998–2012 |
| Tarnya Smith | Liberal National | 2012–2017 |
| Jess Pugh | Labor | 2017–present |

== Election results ==
=== Elections in the 2020s ===
2024 Queensland state election: Mount Ommaney
| Party | Candidate | Votes | % | ±% |
|---|---|---|---|---|
| Labor | Jess Pugh | 15,005 | 45.46 | −5.14 |
| Liberal National | Lisa Baillie | 12,544 | 38.00 | +5.9 |
| Greens | Chris Richardson | 3,830 | 11.60 | +0.60 |
| One Nation | Thorold Cusack | 1,137 | 3.45 | +0.95 |
| Animal Justice | Michelle Jensz | 492 | 1.49 | +1.49 |
| Total formal votes | | 33,008 | 97.15 | |
| Informal votes | | 970 | 2.85 | |
| Turnout | | 33,978 | 92.10 | |
Two-party-preferred result
| Labor | Jess Pugh | 18,929 | 57.35 | −5.25 |
| Liberal National | Lisa Baillie | 14,079 | 42.65 | +5.25 |
| Labor hold | | Swing | -5.25 | |

2020 Queensland state election: Mount Ommaney
| Party | Candidate | Votes | % | ±% |
|---|---|---|---|---|
| Labor | Jess Pugh | 16,148 | 50.52 | +7.82 |
| Liberal National | Roger Hooper | 10,252 | 32.07 | −4.34 |
| Greens | Asha Worsteling | 3,526 | 11.03 | −2.58 |
| Legalise Cannabis | Clive Brazier | 1,034 | 3.23 | +3.23 |
| One Nation | Michael Powell | 819 | 2.56 | −4.71 |
| Independent | Ian Eugarde | 184 | 0.58 | +0.58 |
| Total formal votes | | 31,963 | 97.25 | +0.64 |
| Informal votes | | 905 | 2.75 | −0.64 |
| Turnout | | 32,868 | 92.39 | +1.65 |
Two-party-preferred result
| Labor | Jess Pugh | 20,012 | 62.61 | +6.85 |
| Liberal National | Roger Hooper | 11,951 | 37.39 | −6.85 |
| Labor hold | | Swing | +6.85 | |

=== Elections in the 2010s ===
2017 Queensland state election: Mount Ommaney
| Party | Candidate | Votes | % | ±% |
|---|---|---|---|---|
| Labor | Jess Pugh | 13,215 | 42.7 | +2.6 |
| Liberal National | Tarnya Smith | 11,270 | 36.4 | −8.7 |
| Greens | Jenny Mulkearns | 4,211 | 13.6 | +2.5 |
| One Nation | Ian Eugarde | 2,250 | 7.3 | +7.3 |
| Total formal votes | | 30,946 | 96.6 | −1.5 |
| Informal votes | | 1,088 | 3.4 | +1.5 |
| Turnout | | 32,034 | 90.7 | −0.9 |
Two-party-preferred result
| Labor | Jess Pugh | 17,255 | 55.8 | +4.8 |
| Liberal National | Tarnya Smith | 13,691 | 44.2 | −4.8 |
| Labor notional hold | | Swing | +4.8 | |

2015 Queensland state election: Mount Ommaney
| Party | Candidate | Votes | % | ±% |
|---|---|---|---|---|
| Liberal National | Tarnya Smith | 13,264 | 46.25 | −11.05 |
| Labor | Jess Pugh | 11,152 | 38.89 | +13.16 |
| Greens | Jenny Mulkearns | 3,161 | 11.02 | +1.24 |
| Palmer United | Kathleen Hewlett | 1,102 | 3.84 | +3.84 |
| Total formal votes | | 28,679 | 98.16 | +0.19 |
| Informal votes | | 537 | 1.84 | −0.19 |
| Turnout | | 29,216 | 92.22 | −0.66 |
Two-party-preferred result
| Liberal National | Tarnya Smith | 13,902 | 50.23 | −16.25 |
| Labor | Jess Pugh | 13,776 | 49.77 | +16.25 |
| Liberal National hold | | Swing | −16.25 | |

2012 Queensland state election: Mount Ommaney
| Party | Candidate | Votes | % | ±% |
|---|---|---|---|---|
| Liberal National | Tarnya Smith | 15,781 | 57.30 | +16.98 |
| Labor | Ben Marczyk | 7,086 | 25.73 | −21.51 |
| Greens | Jenny Mulkearns | 2,694 | 9.78 | −0.20 |
| Katter's Australian | Douglas Newson | 1,169 | 4.24 | +4.24 |
| Family First | Jordan Brown | 452 | 1.64 | +1.64 |
| Independent | Rex Schmith | 360 | 1.31 | +1.31 |
| Total formal votes | | 27,542 | 97.97 | −0.55 |
| Informal votes | | 570 | 2.03 | +0.55 |
| Turnout | | 28,112 | 92.88 | +0.78 |
Two-party-preferred result
| Liberal National | Tarnya Smith | 16,773 | 66.48 | +21.27 |
| Labor | Ben Marczyk | 8,457 | 33.52 | −21.27 |
| Liberal National gain from Labor | | Swing | +21.27 | |

=== Elections in the 2000s ===
2009 Queensland state election: Mount Ommaney
| Party | Candidate | Votes | % | ±% |
|---|---|---|---|---|
| Labor | Julie Attwood | 13,074 | 47.2 | −6.4 |
| Liberal National | Tamara Foong | 11,161 | 40.3 | +5.0 |
| Greens | Rob Huston | 2,763 | 10.0 | −1.1 |
| DS4SEQ | Evan O'Brien | 680 | 2.5 | +2.5 |
| Total formal votes | | 27,678 | 98.4 | |
| Informal votes | | 415 | 1.6 | |
| Turnout | | 28,093 | 92.1 | |
Two-party-preferred result
| Labor | Julie Attwood | 14,476 | 54.8 | −6.5 |
| Liberal National | Tamara Foong | 11,944 | 45.2 | +6.5 |
| Labor hold | | Swing | −6.5 | |

2006 Queensland state election: Mount Ommaney
| Party | Candidate | Votes | % | ±% |
|---|---|---|---|---|
| Labor | Julie Attwood | 12,887 | 52.4 | −3.0 |
| Liberal | Bob Harper | 8,950 | 36.4 | +0.8 |
| Greens | Jos Hall | 2,742 | 11.2 | +3.9 |
| Total formal votes | | 24,579 | 98.3 | −0.4 |
| Informal votes | | 433 | 1.7 | +0.4 |
| Turnout | | 25,012 | 90.0 | −2.7 |
Two-party-preferred result
| Labor | Julie Attwood | 14,384 | 60.2 | −1.4 |
| Liberal | Bob Harper | 9,508 | 39.8 | +1.4 |
| Labor hold | | Swing | −1.4 | |

2004 Queensland state election: Mount Ommaney
| Party | Candidate | Votes | % | ±% |
|---|---|---|---|---|
| Labor | Julie Attwood | 13,756 | 55.4 | +3.4 |
| Liberal | Keith Hamilton | 8,840 | 35.6 | +15.9 |
| Greens | Clive Brazier | 1,826 | 7.3 | +2.5 |
| Independent | Wayne Kirk | 429 | 1.7 | +1.7 |
| Total formal votes | | 24,851 | 98.7 | +0.0 |
| Informal votes | | 327 | 1.3 | −0.0 |
| Turnout | | 25,178 | 92.7 | −0.1 |
Two-party-preferred result
| Labor | Julie Attwood | 14,921 | 61.6 | +2.9 |
| Liberal | Keith Hamilton | 9,290 | 38.4 | +38.4 |
| Labor hold | | Swing | +2.9 | |

2001 Queensland state election: Mount Ommaney
| Party | Candidate | Votes | % | ±% |
|---|---|---|---|---|
| Labor | Julie Attwood | 12,483 | 52.0 | +13.1 |
| Independent | Angelo Bertoni | 5,657 | 23.6 | +23.6 |
| Liberal | Bob Harper | 4,731 | 19.7 | −16.0 |
| Greens | Willy Bach | 1,141 | 4.8 | +1.4 |
| Total formal votes | | 24,012 | 98.7 | |
| Informal votes | | 322 | 1.3 | |
| Turnout | | 24,334 | 92.8 | |
Two-candidate-preferred result
| Labor | Julie Attwood | 13,273 | 58.7 | +7.2 |
| Independent | Angelo Bertoni | 9,323 | 41.3 | +41.3 |
| Labor hold | | Swing | +7.2 | |

=== Elections in the 1990s ===
1998 Queensland state election: Mount Ommaney
| Party | Candidate | Votes | % | ±% |
|---|---|---|---|---|
| Labor | Julie Attwood | 9,030 | 39.3 | −1.7 |
| Liberal | Bob Harper | 8,044 | 35.0 | −11.6 |
| One Nation | Allan Gregory | 2,777 | 12.1 | +12.1 |
| Independent | Peter Pyke | 1,692 | 7.4 | +7.4 |
| Greens | Helen King | 785 | 3.4 | −4.1 |
| Democrats | Natalia Infield | 456 | 2.0 | −2.3 |
| Independent | John Tiplady | 193 | 0.8 | +0.8 |
| Total formal votes | | 22,977 | 98.9 | +0.1 |
| Informal votes | | 263 | 1.1 | −0.1 |
| Turnout | | 23,240 | 92.8 | +0.2 |
Two-party-preferred result
| Labor | Julie Attwood | 11,348 | 51.9 | +3.6 |
| Liberal | Bob Harper | 10,497 | 48.1 | −3.6 |
| Labor gain from Liberal | | Swing | +3.6 | |

1995 Queensland state election: Mount Ommaney
| Party | Candidate | Votes | % | ±% |
|---|---|---|---|---|
| Liberal | Bob Harper | 9,913 | 46.6 | −2.1 |
| Labor | Peter Pyke | 8,718 | 41.0 | −10.3 |
| Greens | Sue Russell | 1,595 | 7.5 | +7.5 |
| Democrats | Julie McCredden | 908 | 4.3 | +4.3 |
| Independent | Nicholas Kapsis | 131 | 0.6 | +0.6 |
| Total formal votes | | 21,265 | 98.8 | +0.9 |
| Informal votes | | 266 | 1.2 | −0.9 |
| Turnout | | 21,531 | 92.6 | |
Two-party-preferred result
| Liberal | Bob Harper | 10,752 | 51.7 | +2.9 |
| Labor | Peter Pyke | 10,051 | 48.3 | −2.9 |
| Liberal gain from Labor | | Swing | +2.9 | |

1992 Queensland state election: Mount Ommaney
| Party | Candidate | Votes | % | ±% |
|---|---|---|---|---|
| Labor | Peter Pyke | 10,386 | 51.2 | +4.9 |
| Liberal | David Dunworth | 9,880 | 48.8 | −4.9 |
| Total formal votes | | 20,266 | 97.8 | |
| Informal votes | | 448 | 2.2 | |
| Turnout | | 20,714 | 92.2 | |
| Labor gain from Liberal | | Swing | +4.9 | |
