= Candidates of the 2013 Australian federal election =

This article provides information on candidates for the 2013 Australian federal election held on 7 September 2013. There were 1,717 candidates in total (1,188 for the House of Representatives and 529 for contested Senate seats).

== Redistributions ==
Redistributions of electoral boundaries occurred in Victoria and South Australia:

- Although draft electoral boundaries released during the 2010 election campaign indicated significant changes would take place in the redistribution in 2011, the Redistribution Committee restarted the process and the final boundaries made minor changes only.
- Changes were minor in South Australia: no divisions changed names, the state's entitlement of 11 seats in the House of Representatives remained, and the redrawn boundaries resulted in no notional change of party.

== Retiring Members ==
=== Labor ===
- Greg Combet MP (Charlton, NSW) – announced retirement 29 June 2013
- Simon Crean MP (Hotham, Vic) – announced retirement 1 July 2013
- Craig Emerson MP (Rankin, Qld) – announced retirement 26 June 2013
- Martin Ferguson MP (Batman, Vic) – announced retirement 29 May 2013
- Peter Garrett MP (Kingsford Smith, NSW) – announced retirement 26 June 2013
- Steve Gibbons MP (Bendigo, Vic) – announced retirement 29 August 2011
- Julia Gillard MP (Lalor, Vic) – announced retirement 26 June 2013
- Sharon Grierson MP (Newcastle, NSW) – announced retirement 18 July 2012
- Harry Jenkins MP (Scullin, Vic) – announced retirement 26 July 2012
- Kirsten Livermore MP (Capricornia, Qld) – announced retirement 27 November 2012
- Robert McClelland MP (Barton, NSW) – announced retirement 29 January 2013
- Nicola Roxon MP (Gellibrand, Vic) – announced retirement 2 February 2013
- Stephen Smith MP (Perth, WA) – announced retirement 27 June 2013
- Senator Mark Bishop (WA) – announced retirement 15 April 2013
- Senator Trish Crossin (NT) – confirmed she will not be standing after losing preselection 28 January 2013
- Senator John Hogg (Qld) – announced retirement 10 August 2012

=== Liberal ===
- Joanna Gash MP (Gilmore, NSW) – announced retirement 25 January 2012
- Barry Haase MP (Durack, WA) – announced retirement 15 June 2013
- Judi Moylan MP (Pearce, WA) – announced retirement 28 July 2011
- Alby Schultz MP (Hume, NSW) – announced retirement 17 April 2012
- Patrick Secker MP (Barker, SA) – announced retirement on 25 June 2013
- Alex Somlyay MP (Fairfax, Qld) – announced retirement 25 September 2010
- Mal Washer MP (Moore, WA) – announced retirement 28 July 2011
- Senator Sue Boyce (Qld) – announced retirement 8 October 2012
- Senator Alan Eggleston (WA) – announced retirement 9 April 2012
- Senator Gary Humphries (ACT) – lost preselection 23 February 2013; announced retirement 26 June 2013

=== National ===
- Tony Crook MP (O'Connor) – announced retirement 9 April 2013
- John Forrest MP (Mallee, Vic) – announced retirement 6 March 2013
- Paul Neville MP (Hinkler, Qld) − announced retirement 10 October 2012
- Senator Ron Boswell (Qld) – announced retirement 21 September 2012

=== Independent ===
- Rob Oakeshott MP (Lyne, NSW) – announced retirement 26 June 2013
- Tony Windsor MP (New England, NSW) – announced retirement 26 June 2013

== House of Representatives ==
Sitting members are listed in bold text. Successful candidates are highlighted in the relevant colour. Where there is possible confusion, an asterisk (*) is also used.

=== Australian Capital Territory ===
Electorate	Held by	Labor candidate	Liberal candidate	Greens candidate	Palmer candidate	Other candidates
Canberra	Labor	**Gai Brodtmann**	Tom Sefton	Julie Melrose	Tony Hanley	Nicolle Burt (SPA); Damien Maher (BTFA)
Fraser	Labor	**Andrew Leigh**	Elizabeth Lee	Adam Verwey	Freddy Alcazar	Darren Churchill (Dem); Sam Huggins (BTFA); Jill Ross (RUAP)

=== New South Wales ===
Electorate	Held by	Labor candidate	Coalition candidate	Greens candidate	Palmer candidate	CDP candidate	Other candidates
Banks	Labor	**Daryl Melham**	David Coleman (Lib)	Paul Spight	Jake Wellham	Mark Falanga	Robert Haddad (DLP); Sayed Khedr (Ind); Ross Richardson (KAP)
Barton	Labor	Steve McMahon	Nickolas Varvaris (Lib)	Jackie Brooker	Edward Caruana	Kylie French	Michael Nagi (Ind); Perry Theo (ON); Rod Wyse (KAP)
Bennelong	Liberal	Jason Yat-Sen Li	**John Alexander** (Lib)	Lindsay Peters	Rob Marks	Julie Worsley	John August (SPA); Lachlan McCaffrey (DLP); Victor Waterson (AFP)
Berowra	Liberal	Michael Stove	**Philip Ruddock** (Lib)	John Storey	Paul Graves	Leighton Thew	Mick Gallagher (Ind); Deborah Smythe (SPP)
Blaxland	Labor	**Jason Clare**	Anthony Khouri (Lib)	John Ky	Zali Burrows	Juliat Nasr	Norm Taleb (KAP); Boutros Zalloua (DLP)
Bradfield	Liberal	Chris Haviland	**Paul Fletcher** (Lib)	Pippa McInnes	Blake Buchanan	John Archer	Paul Harrold (DLP)
Calare	National	Jess Jennings	**John Cobb** (Nat)	David Mallard	Brian Cain	Ian Lyons	Anthony Craig (DLP); Billie Kirkland (KAP); Macgregor Ross (Ind); Peter Schultze (AFP)
Charlton	Labor	Pat Conroy	Kevin Baker (Lib)	Dessie Kocher	Bronwyn Reid	Steve Camilleri	Trevor Anthoney (BTFA); Brian Burston (ON)
Chifley	Labor	**Ed Husic**	Isabelle White (Lib)	Ben Hammond	Christopher Buttel	Dave Vincent	Ammar Khan (Ind); Alex Norwick (AFP); Elizabeth Power (ON); Michael Wright (DLP)
Cook	Liberal	Peter Scaysbrook	**Scott Morrison** (Lib)	Mithra Cox	Matt Palise	Beth Smith	Jim Saleam (AFP); Graeme Strang (Ind)
Cowper	National	Alfredo Navarro	**Luke Hartsuyker** (Nat)	Carol Vernon	Rod Jeanneret	Bethany McAlpine	
Cunningham	Labor	**Sharon Bird**	Philip Clifford (Lib)	Helen Wilson	Christopher Atlee	Rob George	John Bursill (KAP); John Flanagan (NCPP)
Dobell	Labor	Emma McBride	Karen McNamara (Lib)	Sue Wynn	Kate McGill	Hadden Ervin	Nathan Bracken (Ind); Christian Kunde (BTFA); Greg Owen (CEC); **Craig Thomson** (Ind)
Eden-Monaro	Labor	**Mike Kelly**	Peter Hendy (Lib)	Catherine Moore	Dean Lynch	Warren Catton	Costas Goumas (CEC); Andrew Thaler (Ind); Martin Tye (SPP)
Farrer	Liberal	Gavin Hickey	**Sussan Ley** (Lib)	Chris Sobey	Ron Emmerton	Frank Horwill	Brendan Cattell (DLP); Narelle Davis (RUAP); Tracey Powell (BTFA); Ken Trewin (KAP)
Fowler	Labor	**Chris Hayes**	Andrew Nguyen (Lib)	Ben Silaphet	Brad Pastoors	Matt Attia	Darren McLean (KAP)
Gilmore	Liberal	Neil Reilly	Ann Sudmalis (Lib)	Terry Barratt	Lyndal Harris	Steve Ryan	
Grayndler	Labor	**Anthony Albanese**	Cedric Spencer (Lib)	Hall Greenland	Mohanadas Balasingham	Joshua Green	Joel Scully (BTFA)
Greenway	Labor	**Michelle Rowland**	Jaymes Diaz (Lib)	Chris Brentin	Jodie Wootton	Allan Green	Anthony Belcastro (KAP); Jamie Cavanough (AVP); Tom Lillicrap (Sex); Maree Nichols (RUAP)
Hughes	Liberal	Alison Megarrity	**Craig Kelly** (Lib)	Signe Westerberg	John Peters	Peter Colsell	
Hume	Liberal	Michael Pilbrow	Angus Taylor (Lib)	Zaza Chevalier	Jason Cornelius	Adrian Van Der Byl	Lindsay Cosgrove (CEC); James Harker-Mortlock (Ind); Bruce Nicholson (KAP); Lynette Styles (ON)
Hunter	Labor	**Joel Fitzgibbon**	Michael Johnsen (Nat)	David Atwell	Jennifer Stefanac	Richard Stretton	Bill Fox (ON); Ann Lawler (CEC)
Kingsford Smith	Labor	Matt Thistlethwaite	Michael Feneley (Lib)	James Macdonald	Diane Happ	Jacquie Shiha	Geordie Lucas (FP); Danielle Somerfield (RUAP)
Lindsay	Labor	**David Bradbury**	Fiona Scott (Lib)	David Lenton	Andrew Wilcox	Andrew Green	Geoff Brown (SPP); Jeffrey Lawson (ON); Mick Saunders (AFP)
Lyne	Independent	Peter Alley	David Gillespie (Nat)	Ian Oxenford	Troy Wilkie	John Klose	Steve Attkins (Ind); Brian Buckley Clare (KAP); Michael Gough (CEC); Craig Huth (ON)
Macarthur	Liberal	Ian Fulton	**Russell Matheson** (Lib)	Patrick Darley-Jones	Rob Grosche	Sarah Ramsay	Mick Williams (KAP)
Mackellar	Liberal	Chris Hedge	**Bronwyn Bishop** (Lib)	Jonathan King	Debra Drummond	Silvana Nero	
Macquarie	Liberal	Susan Templeman	**Louise Markus** (Lib)	Danielle Wheeler	Philip Maxwell	Tony Piper	Teresa Elaro (DLP); Matt Hodgson (AFP); Mark Littlejohn (Sex)
McMahon	Labor	**Chris Bowen**	Ray King (Lib)	Astrid O'Neill	Matthew Dobrincic	Manny Poularas	
Mitchell	Liberal	Andrew Punch	**Alex Hawke** (Lib)	Michael Bellstedt	Murray Schultz	Darryl Allen	Nathan Dodd (DLP)
New England	Independent	Stephen Hewitt	Barnaby Joyce (Nat)	Pat Schultz	Phillip Girle	Aaron Evans	Brian Dettmann (ON); Jamie McIntyre (Ind); Rob Taber (Ind); Richard Witten (CEC)
Newcastle	Labor	Sharon Claydon	Jaimie Abbott (Lib)	Michael Osborne	Yegon McLellan	Milton Caine	Zane Alcorn (SA); Michael Chehoff (AFP); Lawrence Higgins (AI); Rod Holding (Ind); Susanna Scurry (Ind)
North Sydney	Liberal	Peter Hayes	**Joe Hockey** (Lib)	Alison Haines	Raheam Khan	Maureen Guthrie	Angus McCaffrey (DLP)
Page	Labor	**Janelle Saffin**	Kevin Hogan (Nat)	Desley Banks	Stephen Janes	Carol Ordish	Rod Smith (ON)
Parkes	National	Brendan Byron	**Mark Coulton** (Nat)	Matt Parmeter	Neil Gorman	Michelle Ryan	
Parramatta	Labor	**Julie Owens**	Martin Zaiter (Lib)	Phil Bradley	Gary Loke	Alex Sharah	Kalpesh Patel (Ind); Tania Rollinson (ON); Miechele Williams (DLP)
Paterson	Liberal	Bay Marshall	**Bob Baldwin** (Lib)	John Brown	Jayson Packett	Anna Balfour	Peter Davis (CEC); Bob Holz (RUAP)
Reid	Labor	**John Murphy**	Craig Laundy (Lib)	Pauline Tyrrell	Nadeem Ashraf	Bill Shailer	Emily Dunn (DLP); Bishrul Izadeen (KAP); Raymond Palmer (AI)
Richmond	Labor	**Justine Elliot**	Matthew Fraser (Nat)	Dawn Walker	Phil Allen	John Ordish	Kev Skinner (Ind)
Riverina	National	Tim Kurylowicz	**Michael McCormack** (Nat)	Ros Prangnell	Lex Stewart	Keith Pech	Norm Dunn (KAP); Paul Funnell (DLP); Kim Heath (RUAP); Andrew Lamont (BTFA); Lorraine Sharp (AFP)
Robertson	Labor	**Deborah O'Neill**	Lucy Wicks (Lib)	Kate Da Costa	Steve Whitaker	Holly Beecham	Jake Cassar (Ind); Douglas McFarland (AI); Lawrie McKinna (Ind); Paul Sheeran (DLP)
Shortland	Labor	**Jill Hall**	John Church (Lib)	Jane Oakley	Phil Baldwin	Andrew Weatherstone	
Sydney	Labor	**Tanya Plibersek**	Sean O'Connor (Lib)	Dianne Hiles	Tim Kelly	Lesley Mason	Peter Boyle (SA); Leah Gartner (BTFA); Joanna Rzetelski (Ind); Jane Ward (Ind)
Throsby	Labor	**Stephen Jones**	Gary Anderson (Nat); Larissa Mallinson (Lib)	Peter Moran	May King	John Kadwell	Brian Boulton (DLP); Wayne Hartman (NCPP); Paul Matters (Ind); Glenn Turner (KAP); Elrond Veness (BTFA)
Warringah	Liberal	Jules Zanetti	**Tony Abbott** (Lib)	Will Kitching	Brodie Stewart	Ula Falanga	Mike Bloomfield (RUAP); Mike Cottee (SPP)
Watson	Labor	**Tony Burke**	Ron Delezio (Lib)	Barbara Bloch	John Nasser	David Fraser	Paul Kamlade (RUAP); Stephen Rawson (DLP)
Wentworth	Liberal	Di Smith	**Malcolm Turnbull** (Lib)	Matthew Robertson	Marsha Foxman	Beresford Thomas	Pat Sheil (Ind)
Werriwa	Labor	**Laurie Ferguson**	Kent Johns (Lib)	Daniel Griffiths	Katryna Thirup	John Ramsay	Kerryn Ball (KAP); Michael Byrne (DLP); Marella Harris (ON)

=== Northern Territory ===
Electorate	Held by	Labor candidate	CLP candidate	Greens candidate	Palmer candidate	Other candidates
Lingiari	Labor	**Warren Snowdon**	Tina MacFarlane	Barbara Shaw	Trevor Hedland	Peter Flynn (CEC); Alf Gould (Ind); Kenny Lechleitner (FNPP); Regina McCarthy (RUAP)
Solomon	CLP	Luke Gosling	**Natasha Griggs**	Todd Williams	Stephen Spain	Martin Burgess (VEP); Trudy Campbell (CEC); Eileen Cummings (FNPP); Krystal Metcalf (Sex); Paul Sellick (RUAP)

=== Queensland ===
Electorate	Held by	Labor candidate	LNP candidate	Greens candidate	KAP candidate	Palmer candidate	Other candidates
Blair	Labor	**Shayne Neumann**	Teresa Harding	Clare Rudkin	Dale Chorley	Anthony Stanton	Shannon Deguara (AI); Elwyn Denman (FFP); Anthony Mackin (RUAP)
Bonner	LNP	Laura Fraser Hardy	**Ross Vasta**	Dave Nelson		James MacAnally	Jeff Penny (FFP); Jarrod Wirth (UAP)
Bowman	LNP	Darryl Briskey	**Andrew Laming**	Penny Allman-Payne		John Wayne	Andrew O'Shea (FFP)
Brisbane	LNP	Fiona McNamara	**Teresa Gambaro**	Rachael Jacobs	Connie Cicchini	Veronica Ford	Sharyn Joyner (FFP); John Roles (SPP); Tony Rose (SPA)
Capricornia	Labor	Peter Freeleagus	Michelle Landry	Paul Bambrick	Robbie Williams	Derek Ison	Hazel Alley (FFP); Bruce Diamond (-); Paul Lewis (RUAP)
Dawson	LNP	Bronwyn Taha	**George Christensen**	Jonathon Dykyj	Justin Englert	Ian Ferguson	Andrew Harris (CEC); Lindsay Temple (FFP)
Dickson	LNP	Michael Gilliver	**Peter Dutton**	Tyrone D'Lisle	Jim Cornwell	Mark Taverner	Michael McDowell (FFP); Geoffrey Taylor (RUAP)
Fadden	LNP	Nicole Lessio	**Stuart Robert**	Petrina Maizey	Billy Lawrence	Jim MacAnally	Stewart Boyd (ON); Maurie Carroll (Ind); Jeremy Fredericks (FFP)
Fairfax	LNP	Elaine Hughes	Ted O'Brien	David Knobel	Ray Sawyer	Clive Palmer	Trudy Byrnes (Ind); Mike Holt (ON); Angela Meyer (FFP)
Fisher	LNP	Bill Gissane	Mal Brough	Garry Claridge	Mark Meldon	Bill Schoch	Rod Christensen (RUAP); Mark Maguire (AI); Tony Moore (FFP); **Peter Slipper** (-); Jarreau Terry (Ind)
Flynn	LNP	Chris Trevor	**Ken O'Dowd**	Serena Thompson	Richard Love	Steve Ensby	Kingsley Dickins (RUAP); Renae Moldre (FFP); Duncan Scott (Ind); Craig Tomsett (Ind)
Forde	LNP	Peter Beattie	**Bert van Manen**	Sally Spain	Paul Hunter	Blair Brewster	Amanda Best (FFP); Keith Douglas (AVP); Jonathan Jennings (RUAP); Jan Pukallus (CEC); Joshua Sloss (Ind)
Griffith	Labor	**Kevin Rudd**	Bill Glasson	Geoff Ebbs	Luke Murray	Karin Hunter	Sherrilyn Church (RUAP); Liam Flenady (SA); Adam Kertesz (FFP); Jan McNicol (SPP); Anne Reid (SPA); Greg Sowden (Ind)
Groom	LNP	Troy Murray	**Ian Macfarlane**	Trevor Smith	Chris Whitty	Ewan Mathieson	Rick Armitage (RUAP); Robert Thies (CEC); Alex Todd (FFP)
Herbert	LNP	Cathy O'Toole	**Ewen Jones**	Gail Hamilton	Bronwyn Walker	Martin Brewster	Margaret Bell (AVP); Costa George (Sex); Steve Moir (ON); Nino Marolla (RUAP); Michael Punshon (FFP)
Hinkler	LNP	Leanne Donaldson	Keith Pitt	Mark Simpson	David Dalgleish	Rob Messenger	Reid Schirmer (Ind); Troy Sullivan (FFP)
Kennedy	Independent	Andrew Turnour	Noeline Ikin	Jenny Stirling	**Bob Katter**	George Brazier	Pam Hecht (RUAP); Chester Tuxford (Ind); Dan Vogler (FFP)
Leichhardt	LNP	Billy Gordon	**Warren Entsch**	Johanna Kloot	George Ryan	Bruce Gibson	Dale Edwards (RUAP); Frank Miles (FFP)
Lilley	Labor	**Wayne Swan**	Rod McGarvie	Nic Forster	James Ryan	Benedict Figueroa	Nick Contarino (CEC); Allan Vincent (FFP)
Longman	LNP	Michael Caisley	**Wyatt Roy**	Helen Fairweather	Brad Kennedy	Clem van der Weegen	Ayla Goeytes (Sex); Will Smith (FFP); Caleb Wells (Ind)
Maranoa	LNP	Nick Cedric-Thompson	**Bruce Scott**	Grant Newson	Rowell Walton	John Bjelke-Petersen	George Clouston (RUAP); John Spellman (FFP)
McPherson	LNP	Gail Hislop	**Karen Andrews**	David Wyatt		Susie Douglas	Charles Blake (AVP); Simon Green (FFP)
Moncrieff	LNP	Jason Munro	**Steven Ciobo**	Toni McPherson		Grant Pforr	Veronica Beric (ON); Barrie Nicholson (FFP); Peter Spajic (CEC)
Moreton	Labor	**Graham Perrett**	Malcolm Cole	Elissa Jenkins	Chris Mallcott	Jeremy Davey	Carolyn Ferrando (FFP); Bruce Fry (RUAP); Wayne Grunert (CEC); Hayden Muscat (FP)
Oxley	Labor	**Bernie Ripoll**	Andrew Nguyen	Martin Stephenson	Kathleen Hewlett	Ricky Tang	Frank Karg (DLP); Carrie McCormack (FFP); Scott Moerland (RUAP)
Petrie	Labor	**Yvette D'Ath**	Luke Howarth	John Marshall	Chris Thomson	Thor Prohaska	Geoff Cornell (CEC); Elise Jennings (RUAP); Tasman Spence (FFP)
Rankin	Labor	Jim Chalmers	David Lin	Neil Cotter	Chris Claydon	Bill Rogan	Chris Lawrie (FFP)
Ryan	LNP	Damien Hamwood	**Jane Prentice**	Charles Worringham	Peter Walker	Craig Gunnis	Lisa Demedio (FFP); Michael Sweedman (SPA)
Wide Bay	LNP	Lucy Stanton	**Warren Truss**	Joy Ringrose	Gordon Dale	Stephen Anderson	John Chapman (FFP); Grace Dickins (RUAP)
Wright	LNP	Sharon Murakami	**Scott Buchholz**	Judith Summers	David Nuendorf	Angie Ison	Stephen Lynch (FFP); Tony Maunder (RUAP); Matthew Wright (Ind)

=== South Australia ===
Electorate	Held by	Labor candidate	Liberal candidate	Greens candidate	FFP candidate	Palmer candidate	Other candidates
Adelaide	Labor	**Kate Ellis**	Carmen Garcia	Ruth Beach	Peter Lee	Vince Scali	Liah Lazarou (SA)
Barker	Liberal	Phil Golding	Tony Pasin	Mark Keough	Kristin Lambert	Balwinder Singh Jhandi	Miles Hannemann (Nat); Richard Sage (Ind)
Boothby	Liberal	Annabel Digance	**Andrew Southcott**	Stephen Thomas	Natasha Edmonds	Sally Cox	
Grey	Liberal	Ben Browne	**Rowan Ramsey**	Alison Sentance	Cheryl Kaminski	Kristian Rees	Greg Fidge (Ind)
Hindmarsh	Labor	**Steve Georganas**	Matt Williams	Andrew Payne	Bob Randall	George Melissourgos	David McCabe (DLP); Kym McKay (KAP)
Kingston	Labor	**Amanda Rishworth**	Damien Mills	Palitja Moore	Geoff Doecke	Mitchell Frost	Andy Snoswell (RUAP)
Makin	Labor	**Tony Zappia**	Sue Lawrie	Ami Harrison	Mark Potter	Andrew Graham	Robert Jameson (KAP)
Mayo	Liberal	Norah Fahy	**Jamie Briggs**	Ian Grosser	Bruce Hicks	Bikkar Singh Brar	
Port Adelaide	Labor	**Mark Butler**	Nigel McKenna	Dusan Popovic	Bruce Hambour	Chandy Huynh	Terry Cooksley (AFP)
Sturt	Liberal	Rick Sarre	**Christopher Pyne**	Anne Walker	Kylie Barnes	Gabriella Scali	
Wakefield	Labor	**Nick Champion**	Tom Zorich	Sherree Clay	Paul Coombe	Dino Musolino	Mark Aldridge (Ind); Tony Musolino (KAP)

=== Tasmania ===
Electorate	Held by	Labor candidate	Liberal candidate	Greens candidate	Palmer candidate	Other candidates
Bass	Labor	**Geoff Lyons**	Andrew Nikolic	Lucy Landon-Lane	Chris Dobson	Christine Bergman (FFP); Jin-oh Choi (SPA); Ray Kroeze (AC)
Braddon	Labor	**Sid Sidebottom**	Brett Whiteley	Melissa Houghton	Kevin Morgan	Bernard Shaw (RUAP)
Denison	Independent	Jane Austin	Tanya Denison	Anna Reynolds	Debra Thurley	Bob Butler (Sex); Graeme Devlin (RUAP); Brandon Hoult (SPP); Trevlyn McCallum (FFP); **Andrew Wilkie*** (Ind); Wayne Williams (DLP)
Franklin	Labor	**Julie Collins**	Bernadette Black	Rosalie Woodruff	Marti Zucco	Olwyn Bowden (RUAP); Josh Downes (FFP); Sarah Ugalde (KAP)
Lyons	Labor	**Dick Adams**	Eric Hutchinson	Pip Brinklow	Quentin Von Stieglitz	Gaye James (FFP); Julian Rogers (RUAP)

=== Victoria ===
Electorate	Held by	Labor candidate	Coalition candidate	Greens candidate	Palmer candidate	FFP candidate	Other candidates
Aston	Liberal	Rupert Evans	**Alan Tudge** (Lib)	Steve Raymond	Brad Watt	Tony Foster	Charity Jenkins (Sex); Jennifer Speer (RUAP)
Ballarat	Labor	**Catherine King**	John Fitzgibbon (Lib)	Stephanie Hodgins-May	Gerard Murphy	Shane Clark	Shane Dunne (KAP); Anne Foster (AC); Joshua Mathieson (Sex); Ana Rojas (RUAP); Stephen Vereker (DLP)
Batman	Labor	David Feeney	George Souris (Lib)	Alex Bhathal	Franco Guardiani	Ken Smithies	Rosemary Lavin (AJP); Lianna Sliwczynski (Sex); Philip Sutton (-); Pat Winterton (RUAP)
Bendigo	Labor	Lisa Chesters	Greg Bickley (Lib); Sarah Sheedy (Nat)	Lachlan Slade	Anita Donlon	Alan Howard	Daniel Abikhair (Ind); Sandra Caddy (RUAP); Charlie Crutchfield (Sex); Rod Leunig (CA); Ewan McDonald (AC); Matine Rahmani (Ind); Stephen Stingel (KAP)
Bruce	Labor	**Alan Griffin**	Emanuele Cicchiello (Lib)	Lynette Keleher	Paul Tuyau	Rebecca Filliponi	Geraldine Gonsalvez (DLP); Kiry Uth (Ind); Robert White (RUAP)
Calwell	Labor	**Maria Vamvakinou**	Ali Khan (Lib)	Joanna Nevill	Bryce Letcher	Paul Graham	Maria Bengtsson (AC); Omar Jabir Omar (DLP); Charles Rozario (RUAP); Nevena Spirovska (Sex); Brett Watson (KAP)
Casey	Liberal	Cathy Farrell	**Tony Smith** (Lib)	Steve Meacher	Milton Wilde	Gary Coombes	Paul Barbieri (RUAP); Mike Brown (AC); Jeffrey Leake (CA); Jeanette McRae (Ind)
Chisholm	Labor	**Anna Burke**	John Nguyen (Lib)	Josh Fergeus	Brian Woods	Martin Myszka	Luzio Grossi (Sex); Vidura Jayaratne (SPA); Pat Shea (DLP); Melanie Vassiliou (RUAP)
Corangamite	Labor	**Darren Cheeseman**	Andrew Black (Nat); Sarah Henderson* (Lib)	Lloyd Davies	Buddy Rojek	Peter Wray	Alan Barron (AC); Warren Jackman (CA); Jayden Millard (Sex); Helen Rashleigh (RUAP); Nick Steel (APP); Adrian Whitehead (Ind)
Corio	Labor	**Richard Marles**	Peter Read (Lib)	Greg Lacey	Tony Harrington	Brendan Fenn	Stephanie Asher (Ind); Patrick Atherton (AC); Sue Bull (SA); Yann Legrand (RUAP); Justine Martin (Sex)
Deakin	Labor	**Mike Symon**	Michael Sukkar (Lib)	Brendan Powell	Mario Guardiani	Hannah Westbrook	Stephen Barber (Sex); Mike Barclay (Ind); John Carbonari (AFP); Yasmin De Zilwa (RUAP); Ian Dobby (AC); Steve Raskovy (KAP); Toni Smith (CA)
Dunkley	Liberal	Sonya Kilkenny	**Bruce Billson** (Lib)	Simon Tiller	Kate Ryder	Cameron Eastman	Roy Broff (Ind); Rod Burt (Ind); Yvonne Gentle (RUAP); Eloise Palmi (Sex)
Flinders	Liberal	Joshua Sinclair	**Greg Hunt** (Lib)	Martin Rush	Linda Clark	David Clark	Ashleigh Belsar (AC); Angela Dorian (RUAP); Paul Madigan (Ind); Denis McCormack (Ind); John Zabaneh (NCPP)
Gellibrand	Labor	Tim Watts	David McConnell (Lib)	Rod Swift	Dwayne Singleton	Kerry Arch	Allan Cashion (Sex); Anthony O'Neill (AC)
Gippsland	National	Jeff McNeill	**Darren Chester** (Nat)	Scott Campbell-Smith	Deborah Gravenall	Angie Foster	Ben Buckley (LDP); Peter Dorian (RUAP); Peter Gardner (Ind); Mark Guerin (SPA); Douglas Leitch (Sex); Sav Mangion (CA)
Goldstein	Liberal	Daniel Guttmann	**Andrew Robb** (Lib)	Rose Read	Keith Ryder	Ian Joyner	Lynette Hannie (RUAP)
Gorton	Labor	**Brendan O'Connor**	Phil Humphreys (Lib)	Dinesh Jayasuriya	Anthony Barnes	Scott Amberley	Mabor Chadhuol (AC); Michael Deverala (DLP); Rhiannon Hunter (Sex); Graham Macardy (KAP)
Higgins	Liberal	Wesa Chau	**Kelly O'Dwyer** (Lib)	James Harrison	Phillip Dall	Jamie Baldwin	Leanne Price (RUAP); Graeme Weber (Ind)
Holt	Labor	**Anthony Byrne**	Ricardo Balancy (Lib)	Jackie McCullough	Bobby Singh	Pam Keenan	Jonathan Eli (RUAP); Vivian Hill (AC); Michael Palma (DLP); Lachlan Smith (Sex)
Hotham	Labor	Clare O'Neil	Fazal Cader (Lib)	Lorna Wyatt	Sam Porter	Stephen Nowland	Peter Vassiliou (RUAP)
Indi	Liberal	Robyn Walsh	**Sophie Mirabella** (Lib)	Jenny O'Connor	Robert Murphy	Rick Leeworthy	Helma Aschenbrenner (Sex); Robert Dudley (RUAP); William Hayes (BTFA); Cathy McGowan* (Ind); Jennifer Podesta (Ind); Phil Rourke (KAP)
Isaacs	Labor	**Mark Dreyfus**	Garry Spencer (Lib)	Sandra Miles	Avtar Gill	John Elliott	Karen Dobby (AC); Laith Graham (Sex); James Leach (DLP); Nadia Seaman (RUAP)
Jagajaga	Labor	**Jenny Macklin**	Nick McGowan (Lib)	Chris Kearney	Kitten Snape	Tahlia Eadie	Nick Wallis (Sex)
Kooyong	Liberal	John Kennedy	**Josh Frydenberg** (Lib)	Helen McLeod	Luke McNamara	Jaxon Calder	Tiffany Harrison (Ind); Tim Kriedeman (RUAP); Angelina Zubac (Ind)
Lalor	Labor	Joanne Ryan	Nihal Samara (Lib)	Beck Sheffield-Brotherton	Joe Zappia	Daryl Pollard	Michael Freeman (DLP); Angel Harwood (Sex); Nathan Mullins (Ind); Jonathan Page (SPP); Geoff Rogers (AC); Marion Vale (RUAP)
La Trobe	Labor	**Laura Smyth**	Jason Wood (Lib)	Michael Schilling	Jason Kennedy	Daniel Martin	Rachel Jenkins (DLP); Martin Leahy (Sex); Kevin Seaman (RUAP)
Mallee	National	Lydia Senior	Andrew Broad* (Nat); Chris Crewther (Lib)	Jan Macallister	Mark Cory	Neil Buller	Vince Cirillo (KAP); Michael Coldham (CA); Chris Lahy (CEC); Tim Middleton (RUAP); Amy Mulcahy (Sex); Allen Ridgeway (Ind)
Maribyrnong	Labor	**Bill Shorten**	Ted Hatzakortzian (Lib)	Richard Keech	Philip Cutler	Hayleigh Carlson	Marguerita Kavanagh (DLP); Amy Myers (Sex); Joe Paterno (AC); Jeff Truscott (RUAP)
McEwen	Labor	**Rob Mitchell**	Donna Petrovich (Lib)	Neil Barker	Trevor Dance	Barry Newton	Ian Cranson (CA); Vicki Nash (Sex); Bruce Stevens (KAP); Ferdie Verdan (RUAP)
McMillan	Liberal	Anthony Naus	**Russell Broadbent** (Lib)	Malcolm McKelvie	Matthew Sherry	Luke Conlon	David Amor (KAP); Norman Baker (RUAP); Ross Fisher (CA); Leigh Gatt (Ind); Andrew Kis-Rigo (DLP); John Parker (Ind); Gary Patton (SOL); Ben Staggard (Sex)
Melbourne	Greens	Cath Bowtell	Sean Armistead (Lib)	**Adam Bandt**	Martin Vrbnjak	Noelle Walker	Michael Bayliss (SPP); Kate Borland (Ind); Paul Cummins (AI); Josh Davidson (BTFA); Frazer Kirkman (Ind); Joyce Khoo (RUAP); Anthony Main (-); James Mangisi (Sex); Michael Murphy (DLP); Nyree Walshe (AJP); Royston Wilding (SPA)
Melbourne Ports	Labor	**Michael Danby**	Kevin Ekendahl (Lib)	Ann Birrell	Toby Stodart	Robert Keenan	Steven Armstrong (SPP); Margaret Quinn (RUAP); Melissa Star (Sex); Vince Stefano (DLP)
Menzies	Liberal	Manoj Kumar	**Kevin Andrews** (Lib)	Richard Cranston	Agostino Guardiani	Andrew Conlon	Phil Baker (RUAP); Ramon Robinson (Ind)
Murray	Liberal	Rod Higgins	**Sharman Stone** (Lib)	Damien Stevens	Catriona Thoolen	Alan Walker	Michael Bourke (KAP); Wendy Buck (Ind); Tristram Chellew (Sex); Jeff Davy (CEC); Raymond Hungerford (RUAP); Fern Summer (BTFA)
Scullin	Labor	Andrew Giles	Jag Chugha (Lib)	Rose Ljubicic	Peter Cooper	Katie Conlon	Domenic Greco (KAP); Nathan Rolph (Sex)
Wannon	Liberal	Michael Barling	**Dan Tehan** (Lib)	Tim Emanuelle	Bradley Ferguson	Craig Haberfield	Tess Corbett (AC); Chris Johnson (Sex)
Wills	Labor	**Kelvin Thomson**	Shilpa Hegde (Lib)	Tim Read	Anne Murray-Dufoulon	Concetta Giglia	Dean O'Callaghan (Ind); Adrian Trajstman (Sex); Margarita Windisch (SA)

=== Western Australia ===
Electorate	Held by	Labor candidate	Liberal candidate	Greens candidate	Palmer candidate	Christians candidate	Other candidates
Brand	Labor	**Gary Gray**	Donna Gordin	Dawn Jecks	Craig Lawrence	Bob Burdett	Gabrielle Iriks (RUAP); Mick Le-Cocq (CEC); Andrew Newhouse (FFP); Paul Young (Dem)
Canning	Liberal	Joanne Dean	**Don Randall**	Damon Pages-Oliver	Wendy Lamotte	Derek Bruning	Richard Eldridge (KAP); James Forsyth (Nat); Alice Harper (FFP); Lee Rumble (RUAP)
Cowan	Liberal	Tristan Cockman	**Luke Simpkins**	Adam Collins	Vimal Sharma	David Kingston	Sheila Mundy (RUAP); Che Tam Nguyen (FFP)
Curtin	Liberal	Daryl Tan	**Julie Bishop**	Judith Cullity	Glenn Baker	Gail Forder	Jennifer Whately (RUAP)
Durack	Liberal	Daron Keogh	Melissa Price	Ian James	Des Headland	Grahame Gould	Shane Foreman (RUAP); Ian Rose (FFP); Judy Sudholz (CEC); Aaron Todd (KAP); Shane Van Styn (Nat)
Forrest	Liberal	John Borlini	**Nola Marino**	Gordon Tayler	Edward Dabrowski	Wayne Barnett	Bev Custers (FFP); Mark Morien (RUAP); Michael Rose (Nat); Ian Tuffnell (CEC)
Fremantle	Labor	**Melissa Parke**	Matthew Hanssen	Jordon Steele-John	Vashil Sharma	Owen Mulder	Jim McCourt (FFP); Richard McNaught (KAP); Ron Rowlands (CEC); Philip Scott (RUAP); Teresa van Lieshout (APP); Sam Wainwright (SA)
Hasluck	Liberal	Adrian Evans	**Ken Wyatt**	Peter Langlands	Robin Scott	Jason Whittaker	Chris Munro (Sex); Kyran Sharrin (FFP); Daniel Stevens (KAP)
Moore	Liberal	Jason Lawrance	Ian Goodenough	Louahna Lloyd	Gary Morris	Rex Host	Josh Catalano (ASP); Mary Pritchett (RUAP)
O'Connor	National	Michael Salt	Rick Wilson	Diane Evers	Michael Lucas	Mike Walsh	Phillip Bouwman (KAP); Steven Fuhrmann (FFP); Vanessa Korber (RUAP); Jane Mouritz (Ind); Jean Robinson (CEC); Chub Witham (Nat)
Pearce	Liberal	Madeleine West	Christian Porter	Sarah Nielsen-Harvey	Frank Hough	Danielle Canas	Matthew Corica (Dem); Diane Davies (RUAP); Norman Gay (CEC); Craig McAllister (Nat); Eddie Richards (KAP)
Perth	Labor	Alannah MacTiernan	Darryl Moore	Jonathan Hallett	Gabriel Harfouche	Paul Connelly	Ant Clark (Ind); Lesley Croll (FFP); Evelyn Edney (RUAP)
Stirling	Liberal	Dan Caddy	**Michael Keenan**	Tim Clifford	Wayne Thompson	Kevin Host	Matueny Luke (FFP); Kim Mubarak (Ind); Alison Rowe (RUAP)
Swan	Liberal	John Bissett	**Steve Irons**	Gerard Siero	Ken Duncan	Steve Klomp	Noel Avery (KAP); Paul Davies (RUAP); Troy Ellis (APP); Moyna Rapp (FFP)
Tangney	Liberal	Luke Willis	**Dennis Jensen**	Peter Best	Wayne Driver	John Wieske	Stephen Carson (RUAP)

== Senate ==
Sitting senators are listed in bold. Tickets that elected at least one Senator are highlighted in the relevant colour. Successful candidates are identified by an asterisk (*).

=== Australian Capital Territory ===
Two Senate places were up for election. The Labor Party was defending one seat. The Liberal Party was defending one seat.

Labor candidates	Liberal candidates	Greens candidates	Palmer candidates	KAP candidates	Sex Party candidates
1. **Kate Lundy***; 2. Chris Sant	1. Zed Seselja*; 2. Merinda Nash	1. Simon Sheikh; 2. Indra Esguerra	1. Wayne Slattery; 2. Paul Teerman	1. Steven Bailey; 2. Joe Arnold	1. Deborah Avery; 2. Jamie Miller
SPP candidates	AJP candidates	Aust Inds candidates	RUAP candidates	Euthanasia candidates	BTFA candidates
1. Mark O'Connor; 2. Greg Graham	1. Marcus Fillinger; 2. Jessica Montagne	1. Anthony Fernie; 2. Valma Petersen	1. Irwin Ross; 2. Jose Henriquez	1. Philip Nitschke; 2. Susan Macdougall	1. Chris Bucknell; 2. Michael Lemmey
DLR candidates	Ungrouped candidates				
1. Paul Cubitt; 2. Stacey Dowson	Emmanuel Ezekiel-Hart				

=== New South Wales ===
Six Senate places were up for election. The Labor Party was defending three seats. The Liberal-National Coalition was defending three seats. Senators Sam Dastyari (Labor), John Faulkner (Labor), Concetta Fierravanti-Wells (Liberal), Bill Heffernan (Liberal), Fiona Nash (National) and Lee Rhiannon (Greens) were not up for re-election.

Labor candidates	Coalition candidates	Greens candidates	Palmer candidates	KAP candidates	CDP candidates
1. **Bob Carr***; 2. **Doug Cameron***; 3. **Ursula Stephens**; 4. Glenn Kolomeitz; 5. Nuatali Nelmes; 6. Bhupinder Chhibber	1. **Marise Payne*** (Lib); 2. **John Williams*** (Nat); 3. **Arthur Sinodinos*** (Lib); 4. Alan Hay (Nat); 5. Carolyn Cameron (Lib); 6. Angus Cameron (Lib)	1. Cate Faehrmann; 2. James Ryan; 3. Penny Blatchford; 4. Christina Ho; 5. Amanda Findley; 6. Ben Spies-Butcher	1. Matt Adamson; 2. Suellen Wrightson	1. Peter Mailler; 2. Tony Maka	1. Robyn Peebles; 2. Deborah Lions; 3. Peter Rahme; 4. Caroline Fraser; 5. Ross Clifford
DLP candidates	FFP candidates	One Nation candidates	WikiLeaks candidates	LDP candidates	Sex Party candidates
1. Simon McCaffrey; 2. Daniel Hanna	1. Fiona Rossiter; 2. Stan Hurley	1. Pauline Hanson; 2. Kate McCulloch; 3. Aaron Plumb	1. Kellie Tranter; 2. Alison Broinowski	1. David Leyonhjelm*; 2. Jeff Pettett	1. Graeme Dunne; 2. Sue Raye
Shooters candidates	Democrats candidates	SEP candidates	AFLP candidates	Secular candidates	HEMP candidates
1. Karl Houseman; 2. Jim Muirhead	1. Ronaldo Villaver; 2. Andrew Wallace	1. Nick Beams; 2. Zac Hambides	1. Bob Lowe; 2. Tim Dean	1. Ian Bryce; 2. Christopher Owen	1. BJ Futter; 2. Jason Olbourne
Euthanasia candidates	SPP candidates	Australia First candidates	SA candidates	Pirate candidates	SOL candidates
1. Shayne Higson; 2. Loredana Mulhall	1. William Bourke; 2. Kris Spike	1. Darrell Wallbridge; 2. Garth Fraser	1. Jim McIlroy; 2. Reg Dare	1. Brendan Molloy; 2. David Campbell	1. Tim Ferguson; 2. Tony Barry; 3. Don McKinnon
NCTCS candidates	Carers candidates	RUAP candidates	Future candidates	AVP candidates	DLR candidates
1. Bill Koutalianos; 2. Mijina McDowall	1. MaryLou Carter; 2. Maree Buckwalter	1. Norm Bishop; 2. Wayne Somerfield	1. James Jansson; 2. James Haggerty	1. Criselee Stevens; 2. Keith Francis; 3. Richard Black	1. Miles Hunt; 2. Tony Trimingham
BAP candidates	ORP candidates	Smokers' candidates	BTFA candidates	APP candidates	AJP candidates
1. Ray Brown; 2. Melanie Symington	1. Rick Obrien; 2. Joaquim de Lima	1. Nicole Beiger; 2. James Whelan	1. Tim Bohm; 2. Charlotte Glick	1. Mark Grech; 2. Christian Johns	1. Mark Pearson; 2. Kate Vickers
Aust Inds candidates	Stop CSG candidates	Republican candidates	UAP candidates	NCPP candidates	AMEP candidates
1. Bradley Tanks; 2. Stephen Hirst	1. Gordon Fraser; 2. Lynda Dean	1. Kerry McNally; 2. Jason Blake	1. Peter Simonds; 2. Tanya Watt	1. Andy Thompson; 2. Josh Thompson	1. Gary Myers; 2. Daniel Kirkness
Group F candidates	Group AG candidates	Ungrouped candidates			
1. Andrew Whalan; 2. Peter Cooper	1. Tom Wang; 2. Daniel O'Toole	Ron Poulsen; David Ash; Sam Nathan; John La Mela			

=== Northern Territory ===
Two Senate places were up for election. The Labor Party was defending one seat. The Country Liberal Party was defending one seat.

Labor candidates	CLP candidates	Greens candidates	Palmer candidates	First Nations candidates	Sex Party candidates
1. Nova Peris*; 2. Rowan Foley	1. **Nigel Scullion***; 2. Linda Fazldeen	1. Warren H Williams; 2. Michael Brand	1. Douglas Te Wake; 2. John McCabe	1. Rosalie Kunoth-Monks; 2. Jeannie Gadambua	1. Joanne Edwards; 2. Tracey Randall
SFP candidates	CEC candidates	SPP candidates	UAP candidates	Aust Inds candidates	RUAP candidates
1. Matt Graham; 2. Christopher Righton	1. Vern Work; 2. Mile Stankovic	1. Jim Miles; 2. Mark Russell	1. Gary Bell; 2. Kathryn Watt	1. Phil Walcott; 2. Lisa Futcher	1. Jan Pile; 2. Michael Cox

=== Queensland ===
Six Senate places were up for election. The Labor Party was defending three seats. The Liberal National Party was defending three seats. Senators George Brandis (Liberal National), Joe Ludwig (Labor), Brett Mason (Liberal National), Jan McLucas (Labor) and Larissa Waters (Greens) were not up for re-election. The seat held by Senator Barnaby Joyce (Liberal National) was also not up for re-election but was vacant due to his resignation to contest the House of Representatives.

Labor candidates	LNP candidates	Greens candidates	KAP candidates	Palmer candidates	FFP candidates
1. Chris Ketter*; 2. **Claire Moore***; 3. **Mark Furner**; 4. Nikki Boyd	1. **Ian Macdonald***; 2. James McGrath*; 3. Matt Canavan*; 4. David Goodwin; 5. Theresa Craig; 6. Amanda Stoker	1. Adam Stone; 2. Sandra Bayley; 3. Stuart Yeaman	1. James Blundell; 2. Shane Paulger; 3. Les Muckan	1. Glenn Lazarus*; 2. Clive Mensink; 3. Scott Higgins	1. Aidan McLindon; 2. Sally Vincent
DLP candidates	Sex Party candidates	SFP candidates	LDP candidates	One Nation candidates	Democrats candidates
1. John Quinn; 2. Sheila Vincent	1. Joel Murray; 2. Kirsty Patten	1. David Curless; 2. Pete Johnson	1. Gabriel Buckley; 2. Cameron Mitchell	1. Jim Savage; 2. Ian Nelson	1. Paul Stevenson; 2. Cheryl Hayden
Christians candidates	AFLP candidates	AJP candidates	Aust Inds candidates	HEMP candidates	AVP candidates
1. Ludy Sweeris-Sigrist; 2. Malcolm Brice	1. Daniel McCarthy; 2. Suzzanne Wyatt	1. Jeanette Peterson; 2. Christopher O'Brien	1. Patricia Petersen; 2. Janene Maxwell-Jones	1. James Moylan; 2. Robbo Yobbo	1. Bevan Collingwood; 2. George Friend
AFP candidates	SEP candidates	APP candidates	BAP candidates	SOL candidates	ORP candidates
1. Peter Schuback; 2. Peter Watson	1. Mike Head; 2. Gabriela Zabala	1. Doug Boag; 2. Rick Heyward	1. Stuart Osman; 2. Ryan Harris	1. LB Joum; 2. Ricky Jefferyes	1. John Rooth; 2. Fay Destry
Pirate candidates	Stop CSG candidates	SPP candidates	Republican candidates	UAP candidates	RUAP candidates
1. Melanie Thomas; 2. Liam Pomfret	1. Brian Monk; 2. Deedre Kabel	1. Jane O'Sullivan; 2. Matt Moran	1. Jeffery Talbot; 2. Rees Pearse	1. John Smith; 2. Danny Watt; 3. Peter Banhuk	1. Michael Jennings; 2. Garry White
NCTCS candidates	AMEP candidates	Smokers' candidates	Secular candidates	Group C candidates	Group T candidates
1. Terence Cardwell; 2. Alan Rutland	1. Keith Littler; 2. Tony Morrison	1. Rachel Connor; 2. Kelly Liddle	1. Hilton Travis; 2. Neil Muirhead	1. Peter Keioskie; 2. Roland Taylor	1. Greg Rudd; 2. Emily Dinsey

=== South Australia ===
Six Senate places were up for election. The Labor Party was defending two seats. The Liberal Party was defending two seats. The Greens were defending one seat. Independent Senator Nick Xenophon was defending one seat. Senators Sean Edwards (Liberal), David Fawcett (Liberal), Alex Gallacher (Labor), Anne McEwen (Labor), Anne Ruston (Liberal) and Penny Wright (Greens) were not up for re-election.

Labor candidates	Liberal candidates	Greens candidates	Xenophon candidates	FFP candidates	Palmer candidates
1. **Penny Wong***; 2. **Don Farrell**; 3. Simon Pisoni	1. **Cory Bernardi***; 2. **Simon Birmingham***; 3. Cathie Webb; 4. Gary Burgess	1. **Sarah Hanson-Young***; 2. Nikki Mortier; 3. Matthew Carey	1. **Nick Xenophon***; 2. Stirling Griff	1. Bob Day*; 2. Judi Potter; 3. Dan Casey	1. James McDonald; 2. Gary Collis
KAP candidates	DLP candidates	National candidates	Democrats candidates	SFP candidates	Sex Party candidates
1. Glenn O'Rourke; 2. Leah O'Rourke	1. Kim Lawless; 2. Tanya Linsell	1. James Stacey; 2. Rachel Titley	1. Jeanie Walker; 2. Andrew Castrique	1. Jess Marks; 2. John Hahn	1. Deb Milka; 2. Jason Virgo
LDP candidates	One Nation candidates	Christians candidates	SEP candidates	Secular candidates	RUAP candidates
1. Michael Gameau; 2. Michael Noack	1. Peter Fitzpatrick; 2. Kym Dunbar	1. Trevor Grace; 2. Theophilus Engela	1. James Cogan; 2. Peter Byrne	1. Moira Clarke; 2. Catherine Mactier	1. Jeff Flint; 2. Paul Hales
CA candidates	Aust Inds candidates	AJP candidates	NCTCS candidates	HEMP candidates	DLR candidates
1. Steven Davies; 2. John Michelmore	1. Tanya Crago; 2. Graeme Maxwell-Jones	1. Colin Thomas; 2. Sally Sutton	1. Leon Ashby; 2. David Smith	1. Ray Thorpe; 2. Chris Calvert	1. Damon Adams; 2. John Jiggens
SPP candidates	Smokers' candidates	Euthanasia candidates	BAP candidates	AMEP candidates	AFLP candidates
1. Greg Oates; 2. Madeleine Wearne	1. Tyrone Lock; 2. Adam Frost	1. Maxwell Bromsom; 2. Michael Boerema	1. Michael Noble; 2. Bill Adams	1. Nathan Green; 2. Robert Stewart	1. Darren Haydon; 2. Chris Miles
ORP candidates	Group I candidates	Group L candidates	Ungrouped candidates		
1. Steven Burgess; 2. Gordon Bennett	1. Ribnga Green; 2. Zita Adut Ngor	1. Dianah Mieglich; 2. John Rohde	Christopher Cochrane; Robert Weaver		

=== Tasmania ===
Six Senate places were up for election. The Labor Party was defending three seats. The Liberal Party was defending two seats. The Australian Greens were defending one seat. Senators Eric Abetz (Liberal), Christine Milne (Greens), Stephen Parry (Liberal), Helen Polley (Labor), Lisa Singh (Labor) and Anne Urquhart (Labor) were not up for re-election.

Labor candidates	Liberal candidates	Greens candidates	Palmer candidates	KAP candidates	DLP candidates
1. **Carol Brown***; 2. **Catryna Bilyk***; 3. **Lin Thorp**; 4. John Dowling	1. **Richard Colbeck***; 2. **David Bushby***; 3. Sally Chandler; 4. Sarah Courtney	1. **Peter Whish-Wilson***; 2. Helen Burnet; 3. Penelope Ann	1. Jacqui Lambie*; 2. Kevin Deakin	1. Geoff Herbert; 2. Joanne Rolls	1. Robyne Ferri; 2. Glen McNamara
FFP candidates	LDP candidates	SFP candidates	Sex Party candidates	Christians candidates	CA candidates
1. Peter Madden; 2. Andrew Goelst; 3. Nick Cramp; 4. Mihi Ngawhare	1. Clinton Mead; 2. Katrina Lloyd	1. Matthew Allen; 2. Shane Broadby	1. Robbie Swan; 2. Liam Eales	1. Kevin Swarts; 2. Ans Jongeling	1. Cheryl Arnol; 2. Debra Garth
RUAP candidates	Pirate candidates	HEMP candidates	Aust Inds candidates	SOL candidates	NCTCS candidates
1. Philip Lamont; 2. Peter Gathercole	1. Thomas Randle; 2. Thomas Storey	1. Matt Owen; 2. John Reeves	1. Neville Solomon; 2. Steven Wood	1. David Bullard; 2. Sven Wiener	1. James Hawes; 2. Petta Hines
AFLP candidates	SPP candidates	Republican candidates	Smokers' candidates	ORP candidates	Ungrouped candidates
1. Maxwell Stewart; 2. Lorraine Stewart	1. Todd Dudley; 2. Pierre Richardson	1. Nick Rouen; 2. Timothy Rouen	1. Graham Nickols; 2. Matthew Thompson	1. Ian Best; 2. John Phibbs	Andrew Roberts

=== Victoria ===
Six Senate places are up for election. The Labor Party was defending three seats. The Liberal-National Coalition was defending three seats. Senators Kim Carr (Labor), Stephen Conroy (Labor), Richard Di Natale (Greens), John Madigan (Democratic Labour), Bridget McKenzie (National) and Michael Ronaldson (Liberal) were not up for re-election.

Labor candidates	Coalition candidates	Greens candidates	Palmer candidates	KAP candidates	DLP candidates
1. **Gavin Marshall***; 2. **Jacinta Collins***; 3. **Mehmet Tillem**; 4. Lynn Psaila; 5. Terry Larkins; 6. Jamie Mileto	1. **Mitch Fifield*** (Lib); 2. **Scott Ryan*** (Lib); 3. **Helen Kroger** (Lib); 4. Martin Corboy (Nat)	1. Janet Rice*; 2. Trent McCarthy; 3. Huong Truong; 4. Ian Christoe; 5. Gurm Sekhon; 6. Robert Humphreys	1. Barry Michael; 2. Doug Hawkins; 3. Penny Palman	1. Robert Danieli; 2. David Costabile	1. Mark Farrell; 2. Stephanie Mazzarella
FFP candidates	WikiLeaks candidates	Sex Party candidates	CA candidates	SFP candidates	LDP candidates
1. Ashley Fenn; 2. Trudie Morris	1. Julian Assange; 2. Leslie Cannold; 3. Binoy Kampmark	1. Fiona Patten; 2. Ange Hopkins	1. Andrew Jones; 2. Garry Kerr	1. Terry Maloney; 2. Steve Malcolm	1. Peter Whelan; 2. Tim Wilms
One Nation candidates	Christians candidates	Democrats candidates	RUAP candidates	SOL candidates	HEMP candidates
1. Dale Townsend; 2. Rosalie Townsend	1. Vickie Janson; 2. Frank Papafotiou	1. David Collyer; 2. Roger Howe; 3. Sarina Isgro; 4. Greg Raines; 5. Robert Livesay; 6. Richard Grummet	1. Danny Nalliah; 2. Rosalie Crestani	1. Lloyd Taylor; 2. Tony Smith	1. Matt Riley; 2. Ryan Fletcher
Secular candidates	NCTCS candidates	BRP candidates	SPP candidates	Smokers' candidates	AFLP candidates
1. John Perkins; 2. Rosemary Sceats	1. Chris Dawson; 2. John Rodda	1. Maria Rigoni; 2. Paul Rigoni	1. Clifford Hayes; 2. Jill Quirk	1. Abe Salt; 2. Janos Beregszaszi	1. Joe Zammit; 2. Richard Abela
BAP candidates	AVP candidates	Aust Inds candidates	Stop CSG candidates	Republican candidates	AJP candidates
1. Darren Evans; 2. Samuel White	1. Immanuel Shmuel; 2. Vern Hughes	1. Samantha Shaw; 2. Yvonne Wood	1. Roger Thorrowgood; 2. Adele van Rosmalen	1. Peter Consandine; 2. Clinton Portors	1. Bruce Poon; 2. Sarah Davison
AMEP candidates	ORP candidates	DLR candidates	BTFA candidates	CEC candidates	SEP candidates
1. Ricky Muir*; 2. Craig Gill	1. Simon Christie; 2. Terry Destry	1. Greg Chipp; 2. John Sherman	1. Mark Erwood; 2. Steve Phillips	1. Craig Isherwood; 2. Robert Barwick	1. Patrick O'Connor; 2. Tania Baptist
Pirate candidates	Group T candidates	Group AJ candidates	Ungrouped candidates		
1. Joseph Miles; 2. Geoffrey Hammett	1. Joseph Toscano; 2. Beth Matthews	1. Bob Nicholls; 2. Kylie Nicholls; 3. Peter Webb	Lyn Gunter; Darrell Morrison		

=== Western Australia ===
Six Senate places were up for election. The Labor Party was defending two seats. The Liberal Party was defending three seats. The Greens were defending one seat. Senators Chris Back (Liberal), Mathias Cormann (Liberal), Sue Lines (Labor), Rachel Siewert (Greens), Dean Smith (Liberal) and Glenn Sterle (Labor) were not up for re-election.

The Senate election in Western Australia was voided by the Court of Disputed Returns after the Australian Electoral Commission lost 1,375 ballot papers during an official recount. The initially elected candidates below were declared to have not been elected, and a 2014 special election was held as a result.

Labor candidates	Liberal candidates	Greens candidates	National candidates	Palmer candidates	KAP candidates
1. Joe Bullock*; 2. **Louise Pratt**; 3. Peter Foster; 4. Suliman Ali	1. **David Johnston***; 2. **Michaelia Cash***; 3. Linda Reynolds*; 4. Slade Brockman; 5. Steve Thomas; 6. Chris Oughton	1. **Scott Ludlam***; 2. Kate Davis; 3. Adam Duncan	1. David Wirrpanda; 2. David Eagles	1. Dio Wang; 2. Chamonix Terblanche	1. Anthony Fels; 2. Susan Hoddinott
SFP candidates	Christians candidates	FFP candidates	Sex Party candidates	WikiLeaks candidates	LDP candidates
1. Murray Bow; 2. John Parkes	1. Jamie van Burgel; 2. Justin Moseley	1. Linda Rose; 2. Henry Heng	1. Steve Palmer; 2. Mark Coleman	1. Gerry Georgatos; 2. Suresh Rajan	1. Jim Fryar; 2. Neil Hamilton
Democrats candidates	Smokers' candidates	HEMP candidates	SEP candidates	AVP candidates	AFLP candidates
1. Chris Fernandez; 2. William Thiel	1. Max Katz-Barber; 2. Daniel Di Rado	1. Michael Balderstone; 2. Tayla Moylan	1. Peter Symonds; 2. Joe Lopez	1. Brian Parkes; 2. Sean Butler	1. Jay Edwards; 2. Ross Finlayson
Secular candidates	Aust Inds candidates	NCTCS candidates	SPP candidates	ORP candidates	AJP candidates
1. Edward Atkins; 2. Simon Cuthbert	1. Daryl Higgins; 2. Patricia Irving	1. Adrian Byass; 2. Heather Dewar	1. Peter Strachan; 2. John Banks	1. David Fishlock; 2. Kim Kinninmont	1. Katrina Love; 2. Alicia Sutton
AMEP candidates	Sports candidates	RUAP candidates	Ungrouped candidates		
1. Richie Howlett; 2. Sharon Young	1. Wayne Dropulich*; 2. Al Lackovic	1. Jane Foreman; 2. Joanne Bennett	Robert Farmer (ON)		

== Summary by party ==
Beside each party is the number of seats contested by that party in the House of Representatives for each state, as well as an indication of whether the party contested the Senate election in the respective state.

Party	NSW		Vic		Qld		WA		SA		Tas		ACT		NT		Total	
Party	HR	S	HR	S	HR	S	HR	S	HR	S	HR	S	HR	S	HR	S	HR	S
Australian Labor Party	48	*	37	*	30	*	15	*	11	*	5	*	2	*	2	*	150	8
Liberal Party of Australia	39	*	36	*			15	*	11	*	5	*	2	*			108	6
Liberal National Party					30	*											30	1
National Party of Australia	10	*	4	*			5	*	1	*							20	4
Country Liberal Party															2	*	2	1
Australian Greens	48	*	37	*	30	*	15	*	11	*	5	*	2	*	2	*	150	8
Palmer United Party	48	*	37	*	30	*	15	*	11	*	5	*	2	*	2	*	150	8
Family First Party		*	37	*	30	*	11	*	11	*	4	*					93	6
Rise Up Australia Party	7	*	31	*	17	*	13	*	1	*	4	*	1	*	2	*	76	8
Christian Democratic Party	48	*															48	1
Katter's Australian Party	15	*	11	*	26	*	7	*	3	*	1	*		*			39	7
Australian Sex Party	2	*	29	*	2	*	1	*		*	1	*		*	1	*	36	8
Democratic Labour Party	17	*	13	*	1	*			1	*	1	*					33	5
Australian Christians			15	*		*	15	*		*	1	*					31	5
Citizens Electoral Council	6		2	*	7		6								2	*	23	2
One Nation	11	*		*	4	*		*		*							15	5
Bullet Train for Australia	7	*	3	*									2	*			12	3
Australia First Party	8	*	1			*			1								10	2
Australian Stable Population Party	4	*	3	*	2	*		*		*	1	*		*		*	10	8
Secular Party of Australia	1	*	3	*	3	*		*		*	1		1				9	5
Country Alliance			8	*						*		*					8	3
Socialist Alliance	2	*	2		1		1		1								7	1
Australian Independents	3	*	1	*	2	*		*		*		*		*		*	6	8
Australian Voice Party	1	*		*	3	*		*									4	4
Non-Custodial Parents Party	2	*	1														3	1
Australian Protectionist Party		*	1			*	2										3	2
Australian Democrats		*		*		*	2	*		*			1				3	5
Future Party	1	*			1												2	1
Animal Justice Party		*	2	*		*		*		*				*			2	6
Australia's First Nations Political Party															2	*	2	1
Liberal Democratic Party		*	1	*		*		*		*		*					1	6
Senator Online		*	1	*		*						*					1	4
Uniting Australia Party		*			1	*										*	1	3
Australian Sports Party							1	*									1	1
Voluntary Euthanasia Party		*								*				*	1		1	3
Shooters and Fishers Party		*		*		*		*		*		*				*		7
Australian Fishing and Lifestyle Party		*		*		*		*		*		*						6
HEMP Party		*		*		*		*		*		*						6
No Carbon Tax Climate Sceptics		*		*		*		*		*		*						6
Outdoor Recreation Party		*		*		*		*		*		*						6
Smokers' Rights Party		*		*		*		*		*		*						6
Australian Motoring Enthusiast Party		*		*		*		*		*								5
Socialist Equality Party		*		*		*		*		*								5
Building Australia Party		*		*		*				*								4
Pirate Party Australia		*		*		*						*						4
Republican Party of Australia		*		*		*						*						4
Drug Law Reform Australia		*		*						*				*				4
Stop CSG Party		*		*		*												3
WikiLeaks Party		*		*				*										3
Carers Alliance		*																1
Bank Reform Party				*														1
Nick Xenophon Group										*								1
Independent and other	23	*	28	*	13	*	3		3	*	1	*		*	1		72	6

== Unregistered parties and groups ==
- The Socialist Party endorsed Anthony Main in Melbourne (Vic).
- The 21st Century Australia Party endorsed Jamie McIntyre in New England (NSW).
- The Progressive Labour Party endorsed Susanna Scurry in Newcastle (NSW).

== Former candidates ==
=== Labor ===
- Trevor Drake: originally preselected candidate for Labor-held Dobell (NSW). He was not endorsed by the central executive and withdrew his nomination in August.
- Des Hardman: originally preselected candidate for LNP-held Forde (Qld).
- Geoff Lake: originally preselected candidate for Labor-held Hotham (Vic). Lake was disendorsed in August 2013 after revelations of a tirade eleven years previously against a wheelchair-using fellow councillor.
- Ken Robertson: originally preselected candidate for Independent-held Kennedy (Qld). Robertson withdrew after a furore surrounding comments in which he called Opposition Leader Tony Abbott a racist and a supporter of the White Australia policy.
- Jeff Salvestro-Martin: originally preselected candidate for Liberal-held Bennelong (NSW). Salvestro-Martin was disendorsed in June 2013 when he was called before the Independent Commission Against Corruption regarding undisclosed political donations.

=== Liberal ===
- Michael Burr: originally preselected candidate for Labor-held Braddon (Tas). Burr withdrew in July 2012 due to ill health.
- Ben Collier: originally preselected candidate for Labor-held McEwen (Vic). Collier withdrew on 4 April 2013 to spend more time with his family.
- Anne Ruston: originally preselected as the third candidate on the South Australian Liberal ticket. Ruston was instead appointed to the Senate on 5 September 2012 to fill the vacancy caused by Mary Jo Fisher's resignation, and thus assumed a long-term vacancy that will not expire until 2017.
- Jeff Shelley: originally preselected candidate for Labor-held Isaacs (Vic). Shelley was replaced by Garry Spencer in February 2013, citing personal reasons.

=== National ===
- Nick Cleary: originally preselected for Labor-held Throsby (NSW). Cleary withdrew to spend more time with his family.
- James De Barro: originally preselected for Liberal-held Barker (SA). De Barro withdrew in late May due to family circumstances.
- Richard Torbay: originally preselected for independent-held New England (NSW). Torbay withdrew and resigned from the party in March 2013 over his ties to former Labor powerbroker Eddie Obeid.

=== Greens ===
- Mehreen Faruqi: originally preselected for the third position on the Greens' New South Wales Senate ticket. Faruqi was instead preselected for the casual vacancy caused by current Greens MLC Cate Faehrmann's resignation to run for the Senate.
- Jim McDonald: originally preselected for LNP-held Fairfax (Qld). He resigned in May following irregularities with his local party membership.
- Debbie Robertson: originally preselected for Labor-held Chifley (NSW). Robertson withdrew for family reasons.

=== Palmer United Party ===
- Roland Abrahams: originally preselected for Labor-held Wills (Vic).
- Mark Bryant: originally preselected for Labor-held Maribyrnong (Vic). Bryant was replaced without comment by Philip Cutler in early July.
- Terry Guthridge: originally preselected for Labor-held Melbourne Ports (Vic).
- Diane Hamilton: originally preselected for Labor-held Capricornia (Qld).
- Nathanael Marler: originally preselected for LNP-held Bonner (Qld).
- Jim McEvoy: originally preselected for LNP-held Groom (Qld).
- Linton Mudie: originally preselected for Labor-held Hindmarsh (SA).
- Jimmy Ng: originally preselected for Labor-held Kingsford Smith (NSW).
- Dennis Pallos: originally preselected for Labor-held Grayndler (NSW).
- Matine Rahmani: originally preselected for Labor-held Bendigo (Vic). Rahmani opted to instead contest the seat as an independent.
- Simon Rock: originally preselected for Independent-held Lyne (NSW).
- Nataliya Shkuratova: originally preselected for Liberal-held Goldstein (Vic).
- Will Tomlinson: originally preselected for National-held Gippsland (Vic).
- Michael Tudman: originally preselected for LNP-held Wide Bay (Qld).
- Teresa van Lieshout: originally preselected for Labor-held Fremantle (WA). Van Lieshout was disendorsed by the party in July 2013. A few days later she was endorsed by the Australian Protectionist Party.

=== Katter's Australian Party ===
- Jamie Cavanough: originally preselected for Labor-held Greenway (NSW). He ran instead for the Australian Voice Party.
- Tess Corbett: originally preselected for Liberal-held Wannon (Vic). Corbett withdrew from the contest in January 2013 after a furore surrounding her comments comparing homosexuality to paedophilia. She was preselected for the seat by the Australian Christians in June.
- Lee Luvara: originally preselected for Liberal-held Indi (Vic).
- James Martinek: originally preselected for Liberal-held Murray (Vic).
- Hadley Mills: originally preselected for LNP-held Bonner (Qld).
- Dennis O'Day: originally preselected for Labor-held Canberra (ACT).
- Brian Watts: originally preselected for National-held O'Connor (WA).
- Greg Wiszniewski: originally preselected for LNP-held McPherson (Qld).

=== Other parties ===
- Stephanie Banister (One Nation): originally preselected for Labor-held Rankin, but withdrew from the election on 10 August following a gaffe-filled television interview in which she mistook Islam for a country.
- Matt Darragh (Family First): originally preselected for LNP-held Flynn (Qld).
- Clayton Denny (One Nation): originally preselected for Labor-held Kingston (SA).
- Ron Dickinson (Australian Independents): originally preselected for Labor-held Oxley (Qld).
- Anthony Fernie (Australian Independents): originally preselected for Liberal-held Gilmore (NSW).
- Adrian Ford (Citizens Electoral Council): originally preselected for Labor-held Sydney (NSW).
- Deanne Graf (Christian Democrats): originally preselected for Labor-held Eden-Monaro (NSW).
- Barry Grant (One Nation): originally preselected for Labor-held Petrie (Qld).
- Julian Grayson (Christian Democrats): originally preselected for Labor-held Charlton (NSW).
- Phil Howarth (Democratic Labour): originally preselected for Labor-held Lindsay (NSW).
- John Kearney (One Nation): originally preselected for CLP-held Solomon (NT).
- Warren Kogler (Australian Christians): originally preselected for Labor-held Bendigo (Vic).
- Tony Pettitt (Australia First): originally preselected for Liberal-held Macquarie (NSW).
- Witold Wiszniewski (Christian Democrats): originally preselected for Liberal-held Bradfield (NSW).

=== Independent ===
- Fernando Alba: originally running for LNP-held Bowman (Qld).
- Noah Beecher Kelk: originally running for Labor-held Melbourne Ports (Vic).
- Peter Bland: originally running for Labor-held McEwen (Vic).
- Ray Buckley: originally running for Labor-held Eden-Monaro (NSW).
- Stuart Christie: originally running for Labor-held Dobell (NSW).
- Tom Ellison: originally running for Labor-held Bass (Tas).
- John Green: originally running for Labor-held Gellibrand (Vic).
- Bill Gupta: originally running for Labor-held Batman (Vic).
- Phillip Jobson: originally running for Labor-held Makin (SA).
- Alan Lappin: originally running for Liberal-held Indi (Vic). He withdrew after suffering a heart attack.
- Kade Lengyel: originally running for Labor-held Isaacs (Vic).
- Kimberley Maurno: originally running for Labor-held Makin (SA).
- Daniel Smith: originally running for Liberal-held Gilmore (NSW).
