= Candidates of the 2010 Australian federal election =

This article provides details on candidates who stood at the 2010 Australian federal election.

Nominations were formally declared open by the Australian Electoral Commission following the issue of the writ on 19 July 2010. Nominations closed on 29 July 2010. The received nominations were declared publicly on 30 July 2010.

The election was held on Saturday 21 August 2010.

== Redistributions and seat changes ==
- Redistributions of electoral boundaries occurred in New South Wales, Queensland, Western Australia, Tasmania and the Northern Territory.
  - In New South Wales, the Labor-held seat of Prospect was renamed McMahon, and the Labor-held seat of Lowe was abolished. The Liberal-held seats of Gilmore, Greenway and Macarthur became notionally Labor.
    - The member for Greenway, Louise Markus (Liberal), contested Macquarie.
    - The member for Lowe, John Murphy (Labor), contested Reid.
    - The member for Prospect, Chris Bowen (Labor), contested McMahon.
    - The member for Reid, Laurie Ferguson (Labor), contested Werriwa.
    - The member for Werriwa, Chris Hayes (Labor), contested Fowler.
  - In Queensland, the notionally LNP seat of Wright was created. The LNP-held seats of Dickson and Herbert became notionally Labor.
  - In Western Australia, the Liberal-held seat of Kalgoorlie was abolished, and the notionally Liberal seat of Durack was created. The Liberal-held seat of Swan became notionally Labor.
    - The member for Kalgoorlie, Barry Haase (Liberal), contested Durack.
  - There were minimal changes in Tasmania and the Northern Territory.

== Retiring Members and Senators ==
=== Labor ===
- James Bidgood MP (Dawson, Qld): announced retirement 5 February 2010
- Jodie Campbell MP (Bass, Tas): announced retirement 30 October 2009
- Bob Debus MP (Macquarie, NSW): announced retirement 5 June 2009
- Annette Ellis MP (Canberra, ACT): announced retirement 22 January 2010
- Jennie George MP (Throsby, NSW): announced retirement 19 November 2009
- Julia Irwin MP (Fowler, NSW): announced retirement 14 September 2009
- Duncan Kerr MP (Denison, Tas): announced retirement 10 September 2009
- Bob McMullan MP (Fraser, ACT): announced retirement 19 January 2010
- Belinda Neal MP (Robertson, NSW): lost preselection 6 March 2010, announced retirement 29 July 2010
- Roger Price MP (Chifley, NSW): announced retirement 19 March 2010
- Lindsay Tanner MP (Melbourne, Vic): announced retirement 24 June 2010
- Senator Michael Forshaw (NSW): announced retirement 1 March 2010
- Senator Annette Hurley (SA): announced retirement 1 July 2010
- Senator Kerry O'Brien (Tas): lost preselection 9 April 2010, did not renominate

=== Liberal ===
- Fran Bailey MP (McEwen, Vic): announced retirement 7 October 2009
- Pat Farmer MP (Macarthur, NSW): lost preselection 30 October 2009; announced retirement 15 February 2010
- Petro Georgiou MP (Kooyong, Vic): announced retirement 23 November 2008
- David Hawker MP (Wannon, Vic): announced retirement 1 June 2009
- Peter Lindsay MP (Herbert, Qld): announced retirement 27 January 2010
- Margaret May MP (McPherson, Qld): announced retirement 14 August 2009
- Chris Pearce MP (Aston, Vic): announced retirement 23 June 2009
- Danna Vale MP (Hughes, NSW): announced retirement 4 August 2009
- Senator Alan Ferguson (SA): announced retirement 4 March 2010
- Senator Nick Minchin (SA): announced retirement 24 March 2010
- Senator Judith Troeth (Vic): announced retirement 14 January 2009

=== National ===
- Kay Hull MP (Riverina, NSW): announced retirement 6 April 2010

== House of Representatives ==
Sitting members are shown in bold text. Successful candidates are highlighted in the relevant colour. Where there is possible confusion, an asterisk (*) is also used.

=== Australian Capital Territory ===
| Electorate | Held by | Labor candidate | Liberal candidate | Greens candidate | Other candidates |
|---|---|---|---|---|---|
| Canberra | Labor | Gai Brodtmann | Giulia Jones | Sue Ellerman | |
| Fraser | Labor | Andrew Leigh | James Milligan | Indra Esguerra | Quintin Hedges-Phillips (SPA) |

=== New South Wales ===
| Electorate | Held by | Labor candidate | Coalition candidate | Greens candidate | CDP candidate | Other candidates |
|---|---|---|---|---|---|---|
| Banks | Labor | **Daryl Melham** | Ron Delezio (Lib) | Paul Spight | | Michael Parsons (ON) |
| Barton | Labor | **Robert McClelland** | John La Mela (Lib) | Simone Francis | | |
| Bennelong | Labor | **Maxine McKew** | John Alexander (Lib) | Lindsay Peters | Julie Worsley | Stephen Chavura (FFP); Martin Levine (BAP); Mary Mockler (CA); Terje Petersen (LDP); Bill Pounder (TCS); Sue Raye (ASP); Victor Waterson (ON) |
| Berowra | Liberal | Michael Stove | **Philip Ruddock** (Lib) | Toni Wright-Turner | Steve Evans | Christian Ellis (FFP); Mick Gallagher (Ind) |
| Blaxland | Labor | **Jason Clare** | Mark Majewski (Lib) | Malikeh Michels | | David Ball (Ind); Abdul Charaf (Ind); Richard Phillips (SEP); Ronald Poulsen (-); Bob Vinnicombe (ON) |
| Bradfield | Liberal | Sarah Gallard | **Paul Fletcher** (Lib) | Susie Gemmell | | |
| Calare | National | Kevin Duffy | **John Cobb** (Nat) | Jeremy Buckingham | Jessyka Norsworthy | Paul Blanch (Ind); Karen Romano (Ind); Macgregor Ross (Ind) |
| Charlton | Labor | **Greg Combet** | John McDonald (Lib) | Ian McKenzie | Mitchell Pickstone | Patrick Barry (Ind); Ann Lawler (CEC) |
| Chifley | Labor | Ed Husic | Venus Priest (Lib) | Debbie Robertson | Dave Vincent | Terry Cooksley (AFP); Keith Darley (Dem); Louise Kedwell (ON) |
| Cook | Liberal | Peter Scaysbrook | **Scott Morrison** (Lib) | Naomi Waizer | Beth Smith | Merelyn Foy (FFP); Richard Putral (ON); Graeme Strang (Ind) |
| Cowper | National | Paul Sekfy | **Luke Hartsuyker** (Nat) | Dominic King | Deborah Lions | John Arkan (Ind) |
| Cunningham | Labor | **Sharon Bird** | Philip Clifford (Lib) | George Takacs | | John Flanagan (NCPP); Jess Moore (SA) |
| Dobell | Labor | **Craig Thomson** | John McNamara (Lib) | Scott Rickard | Rhonda Avasalu | Gavin Brett (FFP) |
| Eden-Monaro | Labor | **Mike Kelly** | David Gazard (Lib) | Catherine Moore | Ursula Bennett | Ray Buckley (Ind); Frank Fragiacomo (Ind); Tom Gradwell (FFP); Olga Quilty (LDP) |
| Farrer | Liberal | Christian Emmery | **Sussan Ley** (Lib) | Peter Carruthers | James Male | Stephen Bingle (Dem); Louise Burge (Ind); Jason Clancy (-); Mathew Crothers (SPA) |
| Fowler | Labor | **Chris Hayes** | Thomas Dang (Lib) | Signe Westerberg | | Mike Head (SEP) |
| Gilmore | Labor | Neil Reilly | **Joanna Gash** (Lib) | Ben van der Wijngaart | Bohdan Brumerskyj | Elizabeth Cunningham (FFP); Don Keys (LDP); Annette Williams (SPA) |
| Grayndler | Labor | **Anthony Albanese** | Alexander Dore (Lib) | Sam Byrne | | James Cogan (SEP); Perry Garofani (Dem); Pip Hinman (SA) |
| Greenway | Labor | Michelle Rowland | Jaymes Diaz (Lib) | Paul Taylor | Allan Green | John Baiada (BAP); Joaquim de Lima (LDP); Iris Muller (FFP); Tony Pettitt (AFP); Michael Santos (Ind); Amarjit Tanda (Ind); Ronaldo Villaver (Dem) |
| Hughes | Liberal | Brent Thomas | Craig Kelly (Lib) | Susan Roberts | Scott Nailon | Peter Bussa (ON); Stan Hurley (FFP); Don Nguyen (LDP) |
| Hume | Liberal | Robin Saville | **Alby Schultz** (Lib) | Kevin Watchirs | Karen Buttigieg | Greg Butler (Dem); Charles Liptak (FFP); Lisa Milat (LDP) |
| Hunter | Labor | **Joel Fitzgibbon** | Michael Johnsen (Nat) | Chris Parker | Wayne Riley | Jennifer Leayr (ON) |
| Kingsford Smith | Labor | **Peter Garrett** | Michael Feneley (Lib) | Lindsay Shurey | | Josh Carmont (Dem); John Cunningham (ON); Zac Hambides (SEP) |
| Lindsay | Labor | **David Bradbury** | Fiona Scott (Lib) | Suzie Wright | Andrew Green | Geoff Brown (Ind); John Phillips (FFP); Mick Saunders (AFP) |
| Lyne | Independent | Frederik Lips | David Gillespie (Nat) | Ian Oxenford | | **Rob Oakeshott*** (Ind); Barry Wright (Ind) |
| Macarthur | Labor | Nick Bleasdale | Russell Matheson (Lib) | Jessica Di Blasio | Nolene Norsworthy | Domenico Cammaveri (BAP); Grant Herbert (FFP); Kate McCulloch (ON); Clinton Mead (Dem) |
| Mackellar | Liberal | Linda Beattie | **Bronwyn Bishop** (Lib) | Jonathan King | | |
| Macquarie | Labor | Susan Templeman | **Louise Markus** (Lib) | Carmel McCallum | Luke Portelli | John Bates (AFP); Amy Bell (Ind); Jason Cornelius (FFP); Terry Tremethick (CA); Peter Whelan (LDP) |
| McMahon | Labor | **Chris Bowen** | Jamal Elishe (Lib) | Astrid O'Neill | Manny Poularas | |
| Mitchell | Liberal | Nigel Gould | **Alex Hawke** (Lib) | Colin Dawson | Brendon Prentice | |
| New England | Independent | Greg Smith | Tim Coates (Nat) | Pat Schultz | | Brian Dettmann (ON); **Tony Windsor*** (Ind); Richard Witten (CEC) |
| Newcastle | Labor | **Sharon Grierson** | Brad Luke (Lib) | Michael Osborne | Milton Caine | Zane Alcorn (SA); Noel Holt (SEP); Dean Winter (Dem) |
| North Sydney | Liberal | Leta Webb | **Joe Hockey** (Lib) | Andrew Robjohns | | Daniel Le (FFP); Daniel Pearce (Dem) |
| Page | Labor | **Janelle Saffin** | Kevin Hogan (Nat) | Jeff Johnson | | Doug Behn (Ind); Julia Melland (Dem); Merle Summerville (Ind) |
| Parkes | National | Andrew Brooks | **Mark Coulton** (Nat) | Matt Parmeter | | John Clements (Ind); Mick Colless (Ind) |
| Parramatta | Labor | **Julie Owens** | Charles Camenzuli (Lib) | Phil Bradley | Alex Sharah | Chris Gordon (SEP); Kalpesh Patel (Ind); Duncan Roden (SA) |
| Paterson | Liberal | Jim Arneman | **Bob Baldwin** (Lib) | Jan Davis | Anna Balfour | Paul Hennelly (-); Veronica Lambert (FFP); Kevin Leayr (ON); Josef Wiedenhorn (Ind) |
| Reid | Labor | **John Murphy** | Peter Cooper (Lib) | Adam Butler | Bill Shailer | Carolyn Kennett (SEP) |
| Richmond | Labor | **Justine Elliot** | Alan Hunter (Nat); Joan van Lieshout (Lib) | Joe Ebono | | Julie Boyd (Ind); Nic Faulkner (Ind); Matthew Hartley (Ind); Stephen Hegedus (Ind); David Robinson (Dem) |
| Riverina | National | Robyn Hakelis | Michael McCormack* (Nat); Andrew Negline (Lib) | David Fletcher | Sylvia Mulholland | Craig Hesketh (ON); Matthew Hogg (Ind); Rhonda Lever (FFP); Tim Quilty (LDP) |
| Robertson | Labor | Deborah O'Neill | Darren Jameson (Lib) | Peter Freewater | Graham Freemantle | Melissa Batten (Ind); Nicole Beiger (LDP); Jake Cassar (Ind); Michael Jakob (FFP); Michelle Meares (Ind); Don Parkes (ON) |
| Shortland | Labor | **Jill Hall** | Deborah Narayanan (Lib) | Phillipa Parsons | | Milton Alchin (ON); Peter Williams (SPA) |
| Sydney | Labor | **Tanya Plibersek** | Gordon Weiss (Lib) | Tony Hickey | | Denis Doherty (Comm); Christopher Owen (SPA); Brett Paterson (Dem); Jane Ward (Ind) |
| Throsby | Labor | Stephen Jones | Juliet Arkwright (Lib); Alan Hay (Nat) | Peter Moran | | Wayne Hartman (NCPP) |
| Warringah | Liberal | Hugh Zochling | **Tony Abbott** (Lib) | Matthew Drake-Brockman | | Kenneth Cooke (SPA); Alexander Gutman (ASP) |
| Watson | Labor | **Tony Burke** | Ken Nam (Lib) | Christine Donayre | | Mark Sharma (Ind) |
| Wentworth | Liberal | Steven Lewis | **Malcolm Turnbull** (Lib) | Matthew Robertson | | John August (SPA); Malcolm Duncan (Ind); Stuart Neal (CA); Pat Sheil (Ind) |
| Werriwa | Labor | **Laurie Ferguson** | Essam Eskaros (Lib) | Lauren Moore | | |

=== Northern Territory ===
| Electorate | Held by | Labor candidate | CLP candidate | Greens candidate | Other candidates |
|---|---|---|---|---|---|
| Lingiari | Labor | **Warren Snowdon** | Leo Abbott | Barbara Shaw | Deirdre Finter (Ind); Peter Flynn (CEC); Kenny Lechleitner (Ind) |
| Solomon | Labor | **Damian Hale** | Natasha Griggs | Emma Young | Trudy Campbell (CEC); John Kearney (ON) |

=== Queensland ===
| Electorate | Held by | Labor candidate | LNP candidate | Greens candidate | FFP candidate | Other candidates |
|---|---|---|---|---|---|---|
| Blair | Labor | **Shayne Neumann** | Neil Zabel | Patricia Petersen | Joshua Olyslagers | Brad King (Ind) |
| Bonner | Labor | **Kerry Rea** | Ross Vasta | Darryl Rosin | Carolyn Ferrando | Greg Sowden (Ind); Utz Wellner (DLP) |
| Bowman | LNP | Jenny Peters | **Andrew Laming** | David Keogh | Karina Windolf | Dave Chidgey (ON); John Kent (DLP) |
| Brisbane | Labor | **Arch Bevis** | Teresa Gambaro | Andrew Bartlett | Mark White | Ewan Saunders (SA) |
| Capricornia | Labor | **Kirsten Livermore** | Michelle Landry | Paul Bambrick | Sandra Corneloup | Shane Guley (Ind); Steve Jeffery (SPA); Bevan Mowen (Ind) |
| Dawson | Labor | Mike Brunker | George Christensen | Jonathon Dykyj | Damian Herrington | Bill Ingrey (CEC) |
| Dickson | Labor | Fiona McNamara | **Peter Dutton** | David Colbert | Alan Revie | Bob Hunter (LDP); Rebecca Jenkinson (Ind) |
| Fadden | LNP | Rana Watson | **Stuart Robert** | Graeme Maizey | Barrie Nicholson | Ian Rossiter (ON) |
| Fairfax | LNP | Dan McIntyre | **Alex Somlyay** | Narelle McCarthy | Ron Hunt | |
| Fisher | LNP | Chris Cummins | **Peter Slipper** | Garry Claridge | Robyn Robertson | |
| Flynn | Labor | **Chris Trevor** | Ken O'Dowd | Anne Goddard | Di Hancock-Mills | John McMahon (DLP); Duncan Scott (Ind) |
| Forde | Labor | **Brett Raguse** | Bert van Manen | Petrina Maizey | Melissa Raassina | |
| Griffith | Labor | **Kevin Rudd** | Rebecca Docherty | Emma-Kate Rose | Jesse Webb | Hamish Chitts (-); Jan Pukallus (CEC); Gregory Romans (LDP) |
| Groom | LNP | Chris Meibusch | **Ian Macfarlane** | Frida Forsberg | Rose Kirkwood | Rod Jeanneret (Ind) |
| Herbert | Labor | Tony Mooney | Ewen Jones | Michael Rubenach | Michael Punshon | |
| Hinkler | LNP | Belinda McNeven | **Paul Neville** | Jenny Fitzgibbon | Trevor Versace | Cy d'Oliveira (Ind); Adrian Wone (Ind) |
| Kennedy | Independent | Andrew Turnour | Ed Morrison | Jess Jones | Fred Dykstra | **Bob Katter*** (Ind) |
| Leichhardt | Labor | **Jim Turnour** | Warren Entsch | Neville St John Wood | Shannon McSweeney | Yodie Batzke (Ind); Steve Lane (Ind); Jen Sackley (Ind) |
| Lilley | Labor | **Wayne Swan** | Rod McGarvie | Andrew Jeremijenko | Andrew Herschell | Douglas Crowhurst (Ind) |
| Longman | Labor | **Jon Sullivan** | Wyatt Roy | Rod Blair | Claire McErlane | Bob Fox (Ind); Andrew Jackson (DLP); John Reece (Ind); Michael van Boeckel (Ind); Joshua van Veen (LDP) |
| Maranoa | LNP | Geoff Keating | **Bruce Scott** | Grant Newson | Greg McKay | Charles Nason (Ind) |
| McPherson | LNP | Dan Byron | Karen Andrews | Ben O'Callaghan | Matthew Reeves | |
| Moncrieff | LNP | Robert Hough | **Steven Ciobo** | Sally Spain | James Tayler | |
| Moreton | Labor | **Graham Perrett** | Malcolm Cole | Elissa Jenkins | Steve Christian | Lee Nightingale (DLP) |
| Oxley | Labor | **Bernie Ripoll** | Tarnya Smith | Des Hoban | Timothy Stieler | |
| Petrie | Labor | **Yvette D'Ath** | Dean Teasdale | Peter Jeremijenko | Sally Vincent | Lawrence Addison (DLP); Gabriel Buckley (LDP) |
| Rankin | Labor | **Craig Emerson** | Luke Smith | Neil Cotter | Alexandra Todd | |
| Ryan | LNP | Steven Miles | Jane Prentice | Sandra Bayley | Allan Vincent | **Michael Johnson** (Ind) |
| Wide Bay | LNP | Nikolee Ansell | **Warren Truss** | Jim McDonald | Ken Herschell | Santo Ferraro (ON) |
| Wright | LNP | Andrew Ramsay | Scott Buchholz | Anna Bridle | Jeremy Fredericks | Ken Degen (Ind) |

=== South Australia ===
| Electorate | Held by | Labor candidate | Liberal candidate | Greens candidate | FFP candidate | Other candidates |
|---|---|---|---|---|---|---|
| Adelaide | Labor | **Kate Ellis** | Luke Westley | Ruth Beach | Sue Neal | Marie Nicholls (Dem); Christopher Steele (LDP); Gemma Weedall (SA) |
| Barker | Liberal | Simone McDonnell | **Patrick Secker** | Sean Moffat | Trevor Honeychurch | Steven Davies (TCS) |
| Boothby | Liberal | Annabel Digance | **Andrew Southcott** | Fiona Blinco | Meredith Resce | Avi Chapman (SPA); Ray McGhee (Ind); Michael Noack (LDP); Thomas Salerno (Dem); Stephen Skillitzi (TCS) |
| Grey | Liberal | Tauto Sansbury | **Rowan Ramsey** | Andrew Melville-Smith | Sylvia Holland | |
| Hindmarsh | Labor | **Steve Georganas** | Jassmine Wood | Matt Fisher | Bob Randall | Greg Croke (Dem); Adrian Paech (TCS) |
| Kingston | Labor | **Amanda Rishworth** | Chris Zanker | Palitja Moore | Geoff Doecke | Ron Baker (Dem) |
| Makin | Labor | **Tony Zappia** | Liz Davies | Jasemin Rose | Mark Potter | Michael Gameau (LDP); Anton Horvat (ON); Wayne Rich (Dem); Robert Stewart (TCS) |
| Mayo | Liberal | Sam Davis | **Jamie Briggs** | Diane Atkinson | Bruce Hicks | John Michelmore (TCS); Rebekkah Osmond (Dem); Andrew Phillips (Ind); Bill Spragg (Ind) |
| Port Adelaide | Labor | **Mark Butler** | Nigel McKenna | Kalyna Micenko | Bruce Hambour | |
| Sturt | Liberal | Rick Sarre | **Christopher Pyne** | Peter Fiebig | Dale Clegg | Darren Andrews (Dem); Jess Clark (LDP); Jack King (ON) |
| Wakefield | Labor | **Nick Champion** | David Strauss | Jane Alcorn | Paul Coombe | Darren Hassan (Dem) |

=== Tasmania ===
| Electorate | Held by | Labor candidate | Liberal candidate | Greens candidate | Other candidates |
|---|---|---|---|---|---|
| Bass | Labor | Geoff Lyons | Steve Titmus | Sancia Colgrave | Adrian Watts (CEC) |
| Braddon | Labor | **Sid Sidebottom** | Garry Carpenter | Scott Jordan | |
| Denison | Labor | Jonathan Jackson | Cameron Simpkins | Geoff Couser | Melanie Barnes (SA); Andrew Wilkie* (Ind) |
| Franklin | Labor | **Julie Collins** | Jane Howlett | Wendy Heatley | John Forster (Ind) |
| Lyons | Labor | **Dick Adams** | Eric Hutchinson | Karen Cassidy | Lucas Noyes (SPA) |

=== Victoria ===
| Electorate | Held by | Labor candidate | Coalition candidate | Greens candidate | FFP candidate | Other candidates |
|---|---|---|---|---|---|---|
| Aston | Liberal | Rupert Evans | Alan Tudge (Lib) | Salore Craig | Rachel Hanna | |
| Ballarat | Labor | **Catherine King** | Mark Banwell (Lib) | Belinda Coates | Jim Rainey | |
| Batman | Labor | **Martin Ferguson** | George Souris (Lib) | Alexandra Bhathal | Andrew Conlon | Con Sarazen (Dem) |
| Bendigo | Labor | **Steve Gibbons** | Craig Hunter (Lib) | Kymberlie Dimozantos | Alan Howard | |
| Bruce | Labor | **Alan Griffin** | Mike Kabos (Lib) | Stefan Zibell | Felicity Hemmersbach | |
| Calwell | Labor | **Maria Vamvakinou** | Wayne Tseng (Lib) | Lenka Thompson | Jeff Truscott | Peter Byrne (SEP) |
| Casey | Liberal | Sami Hisheh | **Tony Smith** (Lib) | Brendan Powell | Daniel Harrison | |
| Chisholm | Labor | **Anna Burke** | John Nguyen (Lib) | Josh Fergeus | Phil Goodman | Nimrod Evans (SPA) |
| Corangamite | Labor | **Darren Cheeseman** | Sarah Henderson (Lib) | Mike Lawrence | Anne Wojczuk | Sally-Anne Brown (Ind); Nathan Timmins (LDP) |
| Corio | Labor | **Richard Marles** | Don Gibson (Lib) | Gavin Brown | Scott Amberley | Sue Bull (SA) |
| Deakin | Labor | **Mike Symon** | Phil Barresi (Lib) | David Howell | Peter Lake | Alex Norwick (AFP); Abraham Seviloglou (Ind); Benjamin Walsh (LDP) |
| Dunkley | Liberal | Helen Constas | **Bruce Billson** (Lib) | Simon Tiller | Yasmin de Zilwa | |
| Flinders | Liberal | Francis Gagliano-Ventura | **Greg Hunt** (Lib) | Bob Brown | Reade Smith | |
| Gellibrand | Labor | **Nicola Roxon** | David McConnell (Lib) | Rod Solin | Liz Mumby | Tania Baptist (SEP); Ben Courtice (SA) |
| Gippsland | National | Darren McCubbin | **Darren Chester** (Nat) | Michael Bond | Heath Jefferis | Ben Buckley (LDP) |
| Goldstein | Liberal | Nick Eden | **Andrew Robb** (Lib) | Neil Pilling | Anthony Forster | |
| Gorton | Labor | **Brendan O'Connor** | Damon Ryder (Lib) | Steve Wilson | Sean Major | |
| Higgins | Liberal | Tony Clark | **Kelly O'Dwyer** (Lib) | Sam Hibbins | Ashley Truter | David Fawcett (Ind) |
| Holt | Labor | **Anthony Byrne** | Ricardo Balancy (Lib) | Frank di Mascolo | Ian George | Mark Hitchins (SPA) |
| Hotham | Labor | **Simon Crean** | Fazal Cader (Lib) | Geoff Payne | Gary Ong | Trent Reardon (SPA) |
| Indi | Liberal | Zuvele Leschen | **Sophie Mirabella** (Lib) | Jenny O'Connor | Robert Cavedon | Mark Carey (Dem); Alan Lappin (Ind) |
| Isaacs | Labor | **Mark Dreyfus** | Dale McClelland (Lib) | Chris Carman | Heather Wheatley | Gordon Ford (Ind) |
| Jagajaga | Labor | **Jenny Macklin** | Johannes Bauch (Lib) | Chris Kearney | Joe Sgarlata | Peter Harris (SPA) |
| Kooyong | Liberal | Steven Hurd | Josh Frydenberg (Lib) | Des Benson | John Laidler | |
| Lalor | Labor | **Julia Gillard** | Sheridan Ingram (Lib) | Peter Taylor | Lori McLean | Marc Aussie-Stone (Ind); Joanne Clarke (Ind); Van Rudd (-); Brian Shaw (Ind); Paul Sheehan (SPA) |
| La Trobe | Liberal | Laura Smyth | **Jason Wood** (Lib) | Jim Reiher | David Barrow | Shem Bennett (LDP); Martin Leahy (ASP) |
| Mallee | National | Bob Scates | **John Forrest** (Nat) | Helen Healy | Carl Carter | |
| Maribyrnong | Labor | **Bill Shorten** | Conrad D'Souza (Lib) | Tim Long | Colin Moyle | Robert Livesay (Dem) |
| McEwen | Liberal | Rob Mitchell | Cameron Caine (Lib) | Steve Meacher | Belinda Clarkson | Mark Bini (LDP); Robert Gordon (SPA) |
| McMillan | Liberal | Christine Maxfield | **Russell Broadbent** (Lib) | Malcolm McKelvie | Linden Stokes | Leigh Gatt (Ind) |
| Melbourne | Labor | Cath Bowtell | Simon Olsen (Lib) | Adam Bandt | Georgia Pearson | David Collyer (Dem); Penelope Green (SPA); Joel Murray (ASP) |
| Melbourne Ports | Labor | **Michael Danby** | Kevin Ekendahl (Lib) | Sue Plowright | Daniel Emmerson | Gregory Storer (SPA); Christian Vega (ASP) |
| Menzies | Liberal | Joy Banerji | **Kevin Andrews** (Lib) | Chris Padgham | Ken Smithies | |
| Murray | Liberal | Hugh Mortensen | **Sharman Stone** (Lib) | Ian Christoe | Serena Moore | Will Clarke-Hannaford (SPA); Jeff Davy (CEC); Ewan McDonald (CDP) |
| Scullin | Labor | **Harry Jenkins** | Max Williams (Lib) | Gurm Sekhon | Ivan Straton | |
| Wannon | Liberal | Judith McNamara | Dan Tehan (Lib) | Lisa Owen | Jahzeel Concepcion | Ralph Leutton (Ind); Allan Marsh (Ind); Robert O'Brien (Ind); James Purcell (Ind); Katrina Rainsford (Ind) |
| Wills | Labor | **Kelvin Thomson** | Claude Tomisich (Lib) | Mark Riley | Daniel Mumby | Trent Hawkins (SA); Craig Isherwood (CEC); Paul Roberton (Dem) |

=== Western Australia ===
| Electorate | Held by | Labor candidate | Liberal candidate | Greens candidate | FFP candidates | CDP candidates | Other candidates |
|---|---|---|---|---|---|---|---|
| Brand | Labor | **Gary Gray** | Donna Gordin | Dawn Jecks | Andrew Newhouse | Bob Burdett | |
| Canning | Liberal | Alannah MacTiernan | **Don Randall** | Denise Hardie | Darren Vernede | Jamie van Burgel | Ian Tuffnell (CEC) |
| Cowan | Liberal | Chas Hopkins | **Luke Simpkins** | Rob Phillips | Alan Leach | David Kingston | |
| Curtin | Liberal | Sophie van der Merwe | **Julie Bishop** | George Crisp | | Pat Seymour | |
| Durack | Liberal | Shane Hill | **Barry Haase** | Julie Matheson | Jane Foreman | Mac Forsyth | Lynne Craigie (Nat) |
| Forrest | Liberal | Jackie Jarvis | **Nola Marino** | Luke Petersen | Bev Custers | Lee Herridge | John Hill (Nat) |
| Fremantle | Labor | **Melissa Parke** | Matt Taylor | Kate Davis | Larry Parsons | Scott Robertson | Sanna Andrew (SA); Keith McEncroe (DLP) |
| Hasluck | Labor | **Sharryn Jackson** | Ken Wyatt | Glenice Smith | Jim McCourt | Linda Brewer | Dot Henry (Ind); Andrew Middleton (TCS) |
| Moore | Liberal | Jeremy Brown | **Mal Washer** | Sheridan Young | Paul Barrett | Meg Birch | George Gault (ON) |
| O'Connor | Liberal | Ian Bishop | **Wilson Tuckey** | Andrew Huntley | Pat Scallan | Jacky Young | Tony Crook* (Nat); Jean Robinson (CEC); Neil Smithson (Ind); Geoffrey Stokes (Ind) |
| Pearce | Liberal | Bill Leadbetter | **Judi Moylan** | Toni Warden | Ian Rose | Janet Broadstock | Darren Moir (Nat); Chris Pepper (CEC) |
| Perth | Labor | **Stephen Smith** | Joe Ferrante | Jonathan Hallett | Nigel Irvine | Paul Connelly | Alex Bainbridge (SA) |
| Stirling | Liberal | Louise Durack | **Michael Keenan** | Chris Martin | Peter Clifford | Jenny Whately | Elizabeth Re (Ind) |
| Swan | Labor | Tim Hammond | **Steve Irons** | Rebecca Leighton | Barry Drennan | Steve Klomp | Joe Lopez (SEP); Bret Treasure (ASP) |
| Tangney | Liberal | David Doepel | **Dennis Jensen** | Peter Best | Moyna Rapp | Ka-ren Chew | |

== Senate ==
Sitting senators are shown in bold text. Tickets that elected at least one Senator are highlighted in the relevant colour. Successful candidates are identified by an asterisk (*).

=== Australian Capital Territory ===
Two Senate places were up for election. The Labor Party was defending one seat. The Liberal Party was defending one seat.

| Labor candidates | Liberal candidates | Greens candidates | Democrats candidates | Ungrouped candidates |
|---|---|---|---|---|
| 1. **Kate Lundy***; 2. David Mathews | 1. **Gary Humphries***; 2. Matthew Watts | 1. Lin Hatfield Dodds; 2. Hannah Parris | 1. Darren Churchill; 2. Anthony David | John Glynn |

=== New South Wales ===
Six Senate places were up for election. The Labor Party was defending three seats. The Liberal-National Coalition was defending three seats. Senators Mark Arbib (Labor), Doug Cameron (Labor), Helen Coonan (Liberal), Marise Payne (Liberal), Ursula Stephens (Labor) and John Williams (National) were not up for re-election.

| Labor candidates | Coalition candidates | Greens candidates | CDP candidates | FFP candidates |
|---|---|---|---|---|
| 1. **John Faulkner***; 2. Matt Thistlethwaite*; 3. **Steve Hutchins**; 4. Anne Murnain; 5. Fiona Seaton; 6. Hugh McDermott | 1. **Concetta Fierravanti-Wells*** (Lib); 2. **Bill Heffernan*** (Lib); 3. **Fiona Nash*** (Nat); 4. Hollie Hughes (Lib); 5. Joe Dennis (Nat); 6. George Bilic (Lib) | 1. Lee Rhiannon*; 2. Keith McIlroy; 3. Brami Jegatheeswaran; 4. Harriett Swift; 5. Simone Morrissey; 6. Dominic Kanak | 1. Paul Green; 2. Robyn Peebles; 3. Elaine Nile | 1. Greg Swane; 2. Phil Lamb |
| Democrats candidates | One Nation candidates | CEC candidates | LDP candidates | SA candidates |
| 1. Fiona Clancy; 2. Jen Mitchell | 1. Andrew Webber; 2. John Brett | 1. Robert Butler; 2. Ian McCaffrey | 1. Glenn Druery; 2. Lucy Gabb; 3. Peter Stitt | 1. Rachel Evans; 2. Soubhi Iskander |
| DLP candidates | Sex Party candidates | SFP candidates | Carers candidates | Climate Sceptics candidates |
| 1. Simon McCaffrey; 2. Martin Cullen | 1. Marianne Leishman; 2. Huw Campbell; 3. Larissa Zimmerman | 1. Jim Muirhead; 2. Alistair McGlashan | 1. Marylou Carter; 2. Maree Buckwalter | 1. Bill Koutalianos; 2. Geoffrey Brown |
| Secular candidates | SEP candidates | NCPP candidates | Senator On-Line candidates | Communist candidates |
| 1. Ian Bryce; 2. Lyle Warren | 1. Nick Beams; 2. Gabriela Zabala | 1. Andy Thompson; 2. Roland Foster | 1. Wes Bas; 2. Brianna Roach | 1. Geoff Lawler; 2. Brenda Kellaway |
| BAP candidates | Group B candidates | Group C candidates | Group D candidates | Group H candidates |
| 1. Ray Brown; 2. Michael O'Donnell | 1. Robert Hodges; 2. Bob Frier | 1. Tony Robinson; 2. Noel Selby | 1. Darrin Hodges; 2. Nick Folkes | 1. Nadia Bloom; 2. Bede Ireland |
| Group K candidates | Group L candidates | Group R candidates | Group T candidates | Group X candidates |
| 1. Meg Sampson; 2. June Hinchliffe | 1. Leon Belgrave; 2. Janos Beregszaszi | 1. David Barker; 2. S. G. Zureik | 1. William Bourke; 2. Mark O'Connor | 1. Jennifer Stefanac; 2. Tucky Cooley |
| Group AB candidates | Group AE candidates | Ungrouped candidates | | |
| 1. Michael Eckford; 2. Criselee Stevens | 1. Cheryl Kernot; 2. Simon Cant | Hamish Richardson; Norman Hooper; Stewart Scott-Irving; Bryan Pape; Andrew Whalan | | |

=== Northern Territory ===
Two Senate places were up for election. The Labor Party was defending one seat. The Country Liberal Party was defending one seat.

| Labor candidates | CLP candidates | Greens candidates | CEC candidates | Sex Party candidates | SFP candidates | Ungrouped candidates |
|---|---|---|---|---|---|---|
| 1. **Trish Crossin***; 2. Matthew Gardiner | 1. **Nigel Scullion***; 2. Rhianna Harker | 1. Warren H Williams; 2. Debbie Hudson | 1. Vernon Work; 2. Graham Setterberg | 1. Seranna Shutt; 2. Shana Leitens | 1. Phillip Hoare; 2. Matt Graham | Ian Lee (Ind); Maurie Ryan (Ind); Duncan Dean (Dem) |

=== Queensland ===
Six Senate places were up for election. The Labor Party was defending two seats. The Liberal National Party was defending four seats. Senators Ron Boswell (Liberal National), Sue Boyce (Liberal National), Mark Furner (Labor), John Hogg (Labor), Ian Macdonald (Liberal National) and Claire Moore (Labor) were not up for re-election.

| Labor candidates | LNP candidates | Greens candidates | FFP candidates | Democrats candidates |
|---|---|---|---|---|
| 1. **Joe Ludwig***; 2. **Jan McLucas***; 3. David Smith; 4. Shannon Fentiman | 1. **George Brandis***; 2. **Barnaby Joyce***; 3. **Brett Mason***; 4. **Russell Trood**; 5. Julie Boyd | 1. Larissa Waters*; 2. Elizabeth Connors; 3. Jenny Stirling | 1. Wendy Francis; 2. Peter Findlay; 3. Amanda Nickson | 1. Paul Stevenson; 2. Jennifer Cluse |
| CDP candidates | DLP candidates | LDP candidates | Sex Party candidates | SA candidates |
| 1. Malcolm Brice; 2. Tony Vogel | 1. Tony Zegenhagen; 2. Angelique Barr; 3. Noel Jackson | 1. Jim Fryar; 2. Robert Fulton | 1. Desiree Gibson; 2. Tim Sheen | 1. Sam Watson; 2. David Lowe |
| One Nation candidates | Secular candidates | Carers candidates | CEC candidates | Senator On-Line candidates |
| 1. Rod Evans; 2. Ian Nelson | 1. Kat Alberts; 2. Peter Shelton | 1. Anne Vetter; 2. Vicki Horne | 1. Robert Thies; 2. Maurice Hetherington | 1. Scott Reading; 2. Joh Embrey |
| SFP candidates | Australia First candidates | Climate Sceptics candidates | AFLP candidates | Group C candidates |
| 1. Andrew Peter; 2. Chris Huggett | 1. Peter Schuback; 2. Nick Maine | 1. Terence Cardwell; 2. Lance Jones | 1. Keith Douglas; 2. Michael Mansfield | 1. Paul Spencer; 2. Mary Spencer |
| Group F candidates | Group G candidates | Group I candidates | Ungrouped candidates | |
| 1. John Pyke; 2. Christopher Tooley | 1. E-Jay Lindsay-Park; 2. Lachlan Guerin | 1. Russell Wattie; 2. John Dowell | Mark White; Don Bambrick; Mark Smith; Jarrod Wirth; Peter Pyke; Maurie Carroll | |

=== South Australia ===
Six Senate places were up for election. The Labor Party was defending three seats. The Liberal Party was defending three seats. Senators Cory Bernardi (Liberal), Simon Birmingham (Liberal), Don Farrell (Labor), Sarah Hanson-Young (Greens), Nick Xenophon (Independent) and Penny Wong (Labor) were not up for re-election.

| Labor candidates | Liberal candidates | Greens candidates | FFP candidates | Democrats candidates |
|---|---|---|---|---|
| 1. Alex Gallacher*; 2. **Anne McEwen***; 3. **Dana Wortley** | 1. **Mary Jo Fisher***; 2. Sean Edwards*; 3. David Fawcett*; 4. Peter Salu | 1. Penny Wright*; 2. Sandy Montgomery; 3. Jeremy Miller | 1. Bob Day; 2. Andrew Cole; 3. Thea Hennessey | 1. Jeanie Walker; 2. Andrew Castrique |
| DLP candidates | CDP candidates | One Nation candidates | LDP candidates | Sex Party candidates |
| 1. Paul Russell; 2. David McCabe | 1. Joseph Stephen; 2. Frank Revink | 1. Robert Edmonds; 2. Peter Fitzpatrick | 1. Nick Kerry; 2. Megan Clark | 1. Ari Reid; 2. Jason Virgo |
| SA candidates | Climate Sceptics candidates | Carers candidates | Senator On-Line candidates | SFP candidates |
| 1. Renfrey Clarke; 2. Ruth Ratcliffe | 1. Leon Ashby; 2. Nathan Ashby | 1. Garry Connor; 2. Angela Groves | 1. Simon Lang; 2. Jamie Dawson | 1. Steve Larsson; 2. Robert Borsak |
| BAP candidates | Secular candidates | Group B candidates | Ungrouped candidates | |
| 1. Bill Adams; 2. Neil Jackson | 1. Scott Sharrad; 2. Moira Clarke | 1. Mark Aldridge; 2. Christopher Cochrane | Michelle Drummond | |

=== Tasmania ===
Six Senate places were up for election. The Labor Party was defending two seats. The Liberal Party was defending three seats. The Australian Greens were defending one seat. Senators Catryna Bilyk (Labor), Bob Brown (Greens), Carol Brown (Labor), David Bushby (Liberal), Richard Colbeck (Liberal) and Nick Sherry (Labor) were not up for re-election.

| Labor candidates | Liberal candidates | Greens candidates | FFP candidates | Democrats candidates |
|---|---|---|---|---|
| 1. **Helen Polley***; 2. Anne Urquhart*; 3. Lisa Singh* | 1. **Eric Abetz***; 2. **Stephen Parry***; 3. **Guy Barnett** | 1. **Christine Milne***; 2. Peter Whish-Wilson; 3. Penelope Ann | 1. Jim Zubic; 2. Hamish Woodcock | 1. Paulene Hutton; 2. Timothy Neal |
| DLP candidates | SFP candidates | Senator On-Line candidates | Secular candidates | Climate Sceptics candidates |
| 1. Mishka Gora; 2. Margaret Williams | 1. Ray Williams; 2. Jeff Blackmore | 1. Julie Murray; 2. Sven Wiener | 1. Jeff Keogh; 2. Jin-oh Choi | 1. Frank Waller; 2. Sally Costella |
| Ungrouped candidates | | | | |
| Dino Ottavi | | | | |

=== Victoria ===
Six Senate places are up for election. The Labor Party was defending two seats. The Liberal-National Coalition was defending three seats. The Family First Party was defending one seat. Senators Jacinta Collins (Labor), David Feeney (Labor), Mitch Fifield (Liberal), Helen Kroger (Liberal), Gavin Marshall (Labor) and Scott Ryan (Liberal) were not up for re-election.

| Labor candidates | Coalition candidates | Greens candidates | FFP candidates | Democrats candidates |
|---|---|---|---|---|
| 1. **Kim Carr***; 2. **Stephen Conroy***; 3. Antony Thow; 4. Marg Lewis; 5. Shelly Freeman | 1. **Michael Ronaldson*** (Lib); 2. Bridget McKenzie* (Nat); 3. **Julian McGauran** (Lib); 4. Susan Jennison (Lib) | 1. Richard Di Natale*; 2. Janet Rice; 3. Nam Bui; 4. Jen Hargrave; 5. Julie Rivendell; 6. Liezl Shnookal | 1. **Steve Fielding**; 2. Gary Plumridge; 3. Ann Bown Seeley; 4. Yuli Goh; 5. Joyce Khoo | 1. Roger Howe; 2. Rick Westgarth |
| One Nation candidates | CEC candidates | LDP candidates | SA candidates | Sex Party candidates |
| 1. Rosalyn Townsend; 2. Phillip Townsend | 1. Doug Mitchell; 2. Katherine Isherwood | 1. Ross Currie; 2. Graeme Klass | 1. Margarita Windisch; 2. Sharon Firebrace; 3. Ron Guy | 1. Fiona Patten; 2. Emma Wilson; 3. Katie Blakey |
| Carers candidates | BAP candidates | Climate Sceptics candidates | DLP candidates | CDP candidates |
| 1. Christopher Monteagle; 2. Wendy Peacock | 1. Darren Evans; 2. Sam White | 1. Chris Dawson; 2. Lee Holmes | 1. John Madigan*; 2. Geraldine Gonsalvez; 3. John Kavanagh | 1. Vickie Janson; 2. Ben Eddy-Veitz |
| SFP candidates | SEP candidates | Senator On-Line candidates | Secular candidates | Group B candidates |
| 1. Peter Kelly; 2. Alex Krstic | 1. Patrick O'Connor; 2. Keo Vongvixay | 1. Glenn Sargent; 2. Emma Wardle | 1. John Perkins; 2. Rosemary Sceats | 1. Joseph Toscano; 2. Jenny Warfe; 3. Andrew Sadauskas |
| Group U candidates | Ungrouped candidates | | | |
| 1. Stephen Mayne; 2. Paula Piccinini | Grant Beale; Glenn Shea | | | |

=== Western Australia ===
Six Senate places were up for election. The Labor Party was defending two seats. The Liberal Party was defending three seats. The Greens were defending one seat. Senators Mark Bishop (Labor), Michaelia Cash (Liberal), Alan Eggleston (Liberal), David Johnston (Liberal), Scott Ludlam (Greens) and Louise Pratt (Labor) were not up for re-election.

| Labor candidates | Liberal candidates | National candidates | Greens candidates | FFP candidates |
|---|---|---|---|---|
| 1. **Chris Evans***; 2. **Glenn Sterle***; 3. Wendy Perdon; 4. Peter MacFarlane | 1. **Mathias Cormann***; 2. **Chris Back***; 3. **Judith Adams***; 4. Jane Mouritz; 5. Jonathan Huston | 1. John McCourt; 2. Ronnie Fleay; 3. Michael Rose | 1. **Rachel Siewert***; 2. Kado Muir; 3. Christine Cunningham | 1. Linda Rose; 2. Steve Fuhrmann |
| Democrats candidates | CDP candidates | CEC candidates | LDP candidates | Climate Sceptics candidates |
| 1. Paul Young; 2. Matthew Corica | 1. Trevor Young; 2. Lachlan Dunjey | 1. Judy Sudholz; 2. Stuart Smith | 1. Mark Walmsley; 2. Mark Dixon | 1. Beau Woods; 2. Heather Dewar |
| SFP candidates | Carers Alliance candidates | SA candidates | Secular candidates | DLP candidates |
| 1. Paul Peake; 2. Christine Peake | 1. Julie Gilmore; 2. Aileen Polain | 1. Ben Peterson; 2. Julie Gray | 1. Guy Curtis; 2. Andrew Thompson | 1. Elaine McNeill; 2. Joe Nardizzi |
| One Nation candidates | Sex Party candidates | Senator On-Line candidates | Group A candidates | Group B candidates |
| 1. Craig Bradshaw; 2. Bill Cook | 1. Justine Martin; 2. Mark Coleman | 1. Daniel Mayer; 2. Keturah Hoffman | 1. Anthony Fels; 2. Felly Chandra | 1. Paddy Embry; 2. Juanita Finnegan |
| Group U candidates | Group V candidates | Ungrouped candidates | | |
| 1. Gerry Georgatos; 2. Bill Hayward; 3. Marianne Mackay; 4. Lara Menkens | 1. Scott Cowans; 2. John Goodlad; 3. James Versteegen | Rosemary Steineck | | |

== Summary by party ==
Beside each party is the number of seats contested by that party in the House of Representatives for each state, as well as an indication of whether the party contested the Senate election in the respective state.

| Party | NSW | | Vic | | Qld | | WA | | SA | | Tas | | ACT | | NT | | Total | |
| Party | HR | S | HR | S | HR | S | HR | S | HR | S | HR | S | HR | S | HR | S | HR | S |
|---|---|---|---|---|---|---|---|---|---|---|---|---|---|---|---|---|---|---|
| Australian Labor Party | 48 | * | 37 | * | 30 | * | 15 | * | 11 | * | 5 | * | 2 | * | 2 | * | 150 | 8 |
| Liberal Party of Australia | 41 | * | 35 | * | | | 15 | * | 11 | * | 5 | * | 2 | * | | | 109 | 6 |
| Liberal National Party | | | | | 30 | * | | | | | | | | | | | 30 | 1 |
| National Party of Australia | 10 | * | 2 | * | | | 4 | * | | | | | | | | | 16 | 3 |
| Country Liberal Party | | | | | | | | | | | | | | | 2 | * | 2 | 1 |
| Australian Greens | 48 | * | 37 | * | 30 | * | 15 | * | 11 | * | 5 | * | 2 | * | 2 | * | 150 | 8 |
| Family First Party | 16 | * | 37 | * | 30 | * | 14 | * | 11 | * | | * | | | | | 108 | 6 |
| Christian Democratic Party | 26 | * | 1 | * | | * | 15 | * | | * | | | | | | | 42 | 5 |
| Australian Democrats | 12 | * | 5 | * | | * | | * | 8 | * | | * | | * | | * | 25 | 8 |
| Liberal Democratic Party | 9 | * | 5 | * | 4 | * | | * | 4 | * | | | | | | | 22 | 5 |
| One Nation | 14 | * | | * | 3 | * | 1 | * | 2 | * | | | | | 1 | | 21 | 5 |
| Secular Party of Australia | 6 | * | 9 | * | 1 | * | | * | 1 | * | 1 | * | 1 | | | | 19 | 6 |
| Citizens Electoral Council | 2 | * | 2 | * | 2 | * | 3 | * | | | 1 | | | | 2 | * | 12 | 5 |
| Socialist Alliance | 4 | * | 3 | * | 1 | * | 2 | * | 1 | * | 1 | | | | | | 12 | 5 |
| Socialist Equality Party | 7 | * | 2 | * | | | 1 | | | | | | | | | | 10 | 2 |
| Democratic Labor Party | | * | | * | 6 | * | 1 | * | | * | | * | | | | | 7 | 6 |
| The Climate Sceptics | 1 | * | | * | | * | 1 | * | 5 | * | | * | | | | | 7 | 6 |
| Australian Sex Party | 2 | * | 3 | * | | * | 1 | * | | * | | | | | | * | 6 | 6 |
| Australia First Party | 4 | | 1 | | | * | | | | | | | | | | | 5 | 1 |
| Carers Alliance | 3 | * | | * | | * | | * | | * | | | | | | | 3 | 5 |
| Building Australia Party | 3 | * | | * | | | | | | * | | | | | | | 3 | 3 |
| Non-Custodial Parents Party | 2 | * | | | | | | | | | | | | | | | 2 | 1 |
| Communist Alliance | 1 | * | | | | | | | | | | | | | | | 1 | 1 |
| Shooters and Fishers Party | | * | | * | | * | | * | | * | | * | | | | * | | 7 |
| Senator On-Line | | * | | * | | * | | * | | * | | * | | | | | | 6 |
| Australian Fishing and Lifestyle Party | | | | | | * | | | | | | | | | | | | 1 |
| Independent and other | 40 | | 15 | | 21 | | 4 | | 3 | | 2 | | | | 2 | | 87 | |

== Unregistered parties and groups ==
Some parties and groups that did not qualify for registration with the Australian Electoral Commission nevertheless endorsed candidates, who appeared on the ballot papers as independent or unaffiliated candidates.

- The Australian Protectionist Party endorsed Andrew Phillips in Mayo and Group D for the Senate in New South Wales.
- The Republican Democrats endorsed Group AB for the Senate in New South Wales and ungrouped candidate Peter Pyke for the Senate in Queensland.
- The Stable Population Party of Australia endorsed Group T for the Senate in New South Wales.
- The Reconcile Australia Party endorsed Group X for the Senate in New South Wales.
- WA First endorsed Group V for the Senate in Western Australia.
- The First Nations Political Party (FNPP) endorsed Kenny Lechleitner in Lingiari and ungrouped candidate Maurie Ryan for the Senate in the Northern Territory.
- The Ecology, Social Justice, Aboriginal Party, affiliated with the FNPP, endorsed Dot Henry in Hasluck, Geoffrey Stokes in O'Connor and Group U for the Senate in Western Australia.
- The Revolutionary Socialist Party endorsed Hamish Chitts in Griffith and Van Rudd in Lalor.
- The Communist League endorsed Ronald Poulsen in Blaxland.
- Stop Population Growth Now endorsed Bill Spragg in Mayo.

== See also ==
- 2010 Australian federal election
- Members of the Australian House of Representatives, 2007–2010
- Members of the Australian Senate, 2008–2011
- List of political parties in Australia
- Divisions of the Australian House of Representatives
