= Michael Feneley =

Australian cardiologist

Professor Michael Patrick Feneley AM is an Australian cardiologist.

== Medical career ==
Feneley has been the Director of Cardiology at St Vincent's Hospital, Sydney, since 1993. Other positions include as Director, Heart Lung Program since 2004, chairman, St Vincent's Medical Council 2003–2008, a board member of St Vincent's and Mater Health Sydney 2003-2008 and Director, Physician Training for over 5 years.

Feneley's research altered the recommendations for the performance of manual cardiopulmonary resuscitation (CPR) and altered the management of patients with atrial fibrillation, the most common significant disturbance of heart rhythm.

== Politics ==
Feneley is a perennial political candidate for the Liberal Party. He was a candidate in the 2010 Australian federal election in the seat of Kingsford Smith, losing to Labor's Peter Garrett.

Seven months later Feneley stood as the Liberal candidate in the 2011 New South Wales state election in the seat of Maroubra where he was defeated by Labor's Michael Daley. He was defeated by Garrett's replacement as Labor candidate, former Senator Matt Thistlethwaite—in the process, paring the Labor margin down to just 2.7 percent.

Feneley recontested Kingsford Smith at the 2016 Federal election but was defeated in a rematch against Thistlewaite. This time, Thistlewaite picked up enough of a swing to revert Kingsford Smith to safe Labor.

Feneley was a candidate for Liberal preselection for the 2018 Wentworth by-election however he was defeated by Dave Sharma.

In 2022 Feneley won preselection for the marginal seat of Dobell on the NSW central coast for the 2022 Federal Election, but was unsuccessful. In 2025, Feneley unsuccessfully sought Liberal Party preselection for the north shore electorate of Bradfield, and the Central Coast electorates of Robertson and Shortland.

== Honours ==
On 11 June 2012, Feneley was named a Member of the Order of Australia for "service to medicine in the field of cardiology as a clinician, researcher and educator, through contributions to professional organisations, and to the community."

== Personal life ==
Feneley is married to his second wife and has four children.

He served as president of the Art Gallery Society of New South Wales Council, the Art Gallery of New South Wales membership organisation, from 2006 to 2010. Prior to this he served as vice-president from 2005 to 2006 and has been a member since 2002.

He has also served as Chair of the East Coast Theatre Company for several years.
