= Jess Pugh =

Australian politician in Queensland

Jess Pugh MP

Member of the Queensland Legislative Assembly for Mount Ommaney
- Incumbent
- Assumed office 25 November 2017
- Preceded by: Tarnya Smith
- Constituency: Mount Ommaney

Personal details
- Born: 29 May 1985 (age 41) South Brisbane, Queensland
- Party: Labor
- Spouse: Talbot Speechley (m. 2020)
- Education: Cannon Hill Anglican College
- Website: jesspughmp.com.au

Jessica Claire Pugh (born 29 May 1985) is an Australian politician. She has been the Labor member for Mount Ommaney in the Queensland Legislative Assembly since the 2017 Queensland election.

== Early life and education ==
Born in Brisbane, Pugh attended Cannon Hill Anglican College and she has a Bachelor of Business from the Queensland University of Technology majoring in International Business and Management.

== Career ==
After graduating in 2007, Pugh worked in the role of Ministerial Adviser in Disability Services, Local Government and Main Roads until 2011. She left to work as an events manager of Restaurant Two, a fine dining institution headed by her father, renowned restaurateur David Pugh, until the restaurant closed in December 2016.

Pugh served as a volunteer in numerous entities such as Queensland Meals on Wheels and Indooroopilly Montessori Children's House. Currently, she is serving as the President of the Centenary Ambulance Committee Branch and as a member of the Sumner Park Rotary Club.

== Politics ==
Pugh contested the seat of Mount Ommaney in the 2015 Queensland state election and achieved a 16% swing, but was narrowly unsuccessful.

In 2017, Pugh was successful in winning the seat of Mount Ommaney, and remains as the incumbent.

Parliament of Queensland
Preceded by Tarnya Smith	Member for Mount Ommaney; 2017–present	Incumbent
