= Julie Attwood =

Australian politician

Member of the Queensland Legislative Assembly for Mount Ommaney
- In office 13 June 1998 – 23 March 2012
- Preceded by: Bob Harper
- Succeeded by: Tarnya Smith

Personal details
- Born: 31 May 1957 (age 69) Bundaberg, Queensland, Australia
- Party: Labor
- Occupation: Public servant

Julie Maree Attwood (born 31 May 1957) is an Australian former politician. She was the Labor Member of the Queensland Parliament for Mount Ommaney from 1998 until she stood down at the 2012 Queensland State Election. She served as a Parliamentary Secretary to the Minister for Child Safety during the last year of Peter Beattie's term as Premier, and was appointed Parliamentary Secretary to the Treasurer by Anna Bligh after she took power in September 2007. When the Bligh Ministry was reshuffled following Labor's re-election at the 2009 election, Attwood was made Parliamentary Secretary to the Minister for Disability Services and Multicultural Affairs, and became she Parliamentary Secretary to the Minister for Health in February 2011.

Attwood obtained a Graduate Certificate of Case Management and Client Service from Deakin University in 1995 and prior to election worked as a Manager in the Commonwealth Employment Service.

Attwood was born in Bundaberg, Queensland and married in 1981.

On 16 January 2012, it was announced that Attwood was would not contest this year's state election. Labor subsequently lost the seat to Tarnya Smith of the Liberal National Party.

== See also ==
- Politics of Queensland

Parliament of Queensland
Preceded by Bob Harper	Member for Mount Ommaney; 1998–2012	Succeeded by Tarnya Smith
