= Bob Harper (politician) =

Australian politician

Member of the Queensland Legislative Assembly for Mount Ommaney
- In office 15 July 1995 – 13 June 1998
- Preceded by: Peter Pyke
- Succeeded by: Julie Attwood

Personal details
- Born: Robert Malcolm Harper; 17 November 1944 Brisbane, Queensland, Australia
- Died: 2 November 2017 (aged 72) Brisbane, Queensland, Australia
- Party: Liberal Party
- Occupation: Accountant

Robert Malcolm Harper (17 November 1944 – 2 November 2017) was an Australian politician. He was a Member of the Queensland Legislative Assembly.

== Early life ==
Harper was born in Brisbane, and worked as an accountant before entering politics.

== Politics ==
Harper was a Liberal Party branch chairman, secretary and treasurer. In 1995 he was elected to the Queensland Legislative Assembly as the Liberal member for Mount Ommaney. Appointed Parliamentary Secretary to the Treasurer and Arts Minister in 1997, he lost his seat to a Labor candidate in 1998.

== Later life ==
Harper died on 2 November 2017. His funeral was held at St Catherine's Anglican Church, Middle Park, Brisbane on Friday 10 November 2017 and was buried that day at Centenary Memorial Gardens in Sumner.

Parliament of Queensland
Preceded by Peter Pyke	Member for Mount Ommaney; 1995–1998	Succeeded by Julie Attwood
