= Dianne Hiles =

Australian politician

Dianne Hiles AM
- Education: University of Sydney
- Occupations: Accountant; Human rights activist
- Political party: Australian Greens

Dianne Marian Hiles AM is an Australian accountant and human rights and refugee activist who co-founded ChilOut, which has advocated for the release of children and families from immigration detention centres since 2001. In recognition of her work with this organisation, as well as with Amnesty International, board of A Just Australia, and the Evatt Foundation, Hiles was made a Member of the Order of Australia in 2010.

== Career ==
Hiles has been a qualified accountant for over 30 years. She holds a Masters in Human Rights from the University of Sydney. She was the mother of a four-year-old when she viewed the ABC TV Four Corners program about six-year-old refugee child Shayan Badraie, who had been held in immigration detention for two years. In response, Hiles co-founded the organisation ChilOut, an abbreviation of "Children Out of Detention", in 2001. She became known as its spokesperson, and as its representative, she visited detention centres on Christmas Island and in the Northern Territory, and publicised conditions of children and families held there. She has been critical of the bipartisan agreement of the ALP and LNP to off-shore processing of asylum seekers, and the detention of children.

Hiles was the Australian Greens candidate for the Division of Sydney at the 2013 federal election.
