= Carers Alliance =

- Leader: MaryLou Carter
- Founded: 2007
- Dissolved: 2015
- Headquarters: PO Box 133; Drummoyne NSW 1470
- Ideology: Social Justice; Human Rights

Website
- www.carers.org.au

The Carers Alliance was a federal political party in Australia registered on 4 September 2007 to make the personal political for people with disabilities and the carers of people who are frail-aged, mentally or chronically ill or disabled.

== Overview ==
Carers Alliance had three planks to its political platform: a population-based benchmark funded system of services and support for people with disabilities; Carer Recognition legislation which gave rights and entitlements to services and support to carers and a regional and national network of carer advocacy and support.

Its policies emphasise support for carers and people with disabilities. In the federal election of 2007 Carers Alliance fielded candidates for the Australian Senate in three states, New South Wales, Queensland and Victoria; In 2010 candidates ran in five states, New South Wales, Queensland, South Australia, Victoria and Western Australia and in 2013 ran a limited campaign in New South Wales.

== Achievement ==
Carers Alliance achieved two out of three of its political objectives. There is now being implemented across Australia a National Disability Insurance Scheme to provide services and support for people with disabilities; and there is now Carers Recognition legislation passed in the Commonwealth jurisdiction and in New South Wales, Queensland, Victoria, South Australia, Western Australia and the Northern Territory - that legislation was a sop by the government of the day and does not give carers the rights and entitlements to services and support as was envisaged and as is the case in the United Kingdom.

In 2015 Carers Alliance requested the Australian Electoral Commission de-register the party. Carers Alliance will promote and pursue the interests of carers through non-political activities and will continue to support the efforts of family carers to have a representative voice for people with moderate to profound intellectual and complex disabilities. This marginalised and forgotten group of Australian citizens, who because of the nature and severe degree of disability literally cannot speak for themselves, has no representation whatsoever and no-one to speak for them except through the agency of their parents and carer-families. This is a cruel and deliberate policy which has caused enormous and measurable disadvantage for people with severe or profound intellectual and complex disabilities in every single area of public policy. This disadvantage was clearly illustrated in an article by researcher Deidre Croft.
