= Tarnya Smith =

Australian politician

Shadow Minister for Science, Innovation and the Digital Economy
- In office 6 May 2016 – 25 November 2017
- Leader: Tim Nicholls
- Preceded by: John McVeigh

Shadow Minister for Aboriginal and Torres Strait Islander and Multicultural Affairs
- In office 14 February 2015 – 6 May 2016
- Leader: Lawrence Springborg
- Preceded by: Desley Scott
- Succeeded by: Fiona Simpson

Assistant Minister for Child Safety
- In office 15 February 2013 – 14 February 2015
- Premier: Campbell Newman
- Preceded by: Rob Molhoek
- Succeeded by: post abolished

Member of the Queensland Parliament for Mount Ommaney
- In office 24 March 2012 – 25 November 2017
- Preceded by: Julie Attwood
- Succeeded by: Jess Pugh

Personal details
- Born: 17 March 1965 (age 61) Sydney, New South Wales, Australia
- Party: Liberal National
- Spouse: Steve Smith
- Occupation: Businesswoman

Tarnya Lisa Smith (born 17 March 1965) is an Australian politician. She was a Liberal National member of the Queensland Legislative Assembly from 2012 to 2017, representing the electorate of Mount Ommaney.

Smith, who had been the candidate for the federal seat of Oxley at the 2010 state election, was elected to the Legislative Assembly at the 2012 state election, defeating new Labor candidate Ben Marczyk. She narrowly retained Mount Ommaney following the 2015 election. The narrow defeat of the Newman Government relegated the LNP to opposition and Smith was promoted to Shadow Cabinet as Shadow Minister for Aboriginal and Torres Strait Islander and Multicultural Affairs by Lawrence Springborg. Her elevation to Shadow Minister for Science, Innovation and the Digital Economy came with the election of Tim Nicholls as Opposition Leader on 6 May 2015.

Smith's seat of Mount Ommaney was altered by an electoral redistribution for the 2017 state election: her 0.2% majority from the 2015 election, already the narrowest in the state, became a 1.0% Labor margin on the new boundaries, making it a notionally Labor seat. She recontested her seat, but was defeated by Labor candidate Jess Pugh.

Parliament of Queensland
Preceded by Julie Attwood	Member for Mount Ommaney; 2012–2017	Succeeded by Jess Pugh
