= Socialist Equality Party (Australia) =

Trotskyist political party

Socialist Equality Party Workers' Party (1933–1972) Socialist Labour League (1972–2010)
- National Secretary: Cheryl Crisp
- Assistant Secretary: Max Boddy
- Founded: 2010; 16 years ago (Note: As Workers' Party.)
- Headquarters: Surry Hills, New South Wales, Australia
- Newspaper: World Socialist Web Site
- Youth wing: International Youth and Students for Social Equality
- Membership (2021): 700 (electoral)
- Ideology: Socialism; Orthodox Trotskyism
- Political position: Far-left
- International affiliation: ICFI
- House of Representatives: 0 / 151
- Senate: 0 / 76

Website
- Official website

The Socialist Equality Party (SEP) is an unregistered Trotskyist political party in Australia. The SEP was established in 2010 as the successor party to the Socialist Labour League, which was founded in 1972 as the Australian section of the International Committee of the Fourth International (ICFI).

According to its 2019 election statement, the party calls for the nationalisation of all major industries and opposes inequality, the MeToo movement, and trade unions.

The party has been deregistered by the Australian Electoral Commission (AEC) due to a lack of members.

== History ==
In 1969 a group calling itself Workers Action was founded with the intention of creating an Australian section of the International Committee of the Fourth International. They succeeded in doing so by 1972, at which point they adopted the name Socialist Labor League. Australian author and political activist Mick Armstrong noted that "the SLL may possibly have become the largest Trotskyist group, with a couple of hundred members in the mid-1970s". As part of a wider move within the ICFI to homogenize the names of their parties, the SLL held a founding congress to officially become the Socialist Equality Party (Australia) in 2010 although were using the name before said congress.

In the 2007 Australian federal election Socialist Alliance called on their supporters to not list SEP candidates above the Australian Greens, making an exception to their standard policy of encouraging members to list any socialist candidates even from other groups over the Greens on their ranked preference list.

In 2015 a planned meeting at the University of Sydney to discuss the "glorification and militarism of Anzac Day" was cancelled by the university because of threats made by the far-right Reclaim Australia group that led to a "potential for disruption to access on campus". This followed a previous cancellation at a local library because of the same far-right threats. A third venue was ultimately found and the meeting held.

SEP campaign launch for the 2026 Victorian state election.

In the 2016 federal election the Socialist Equality Party fielded two Senate candidates in each of New South Wales, Queensland and Victoria, two candidates in New South Wales for the House of Representatives and one in Victoria for the seat of Wills, which also had a Socialist Alliance candidate. The party's platform at this election focused on opposing militarism, advocating for social equality and democracy, and breaking from the two-party system.

The party was deregistered federally in February 2022 due to a lack of members. As a result, the party's candidates at the 2022 federal election stood as independents. The SEP stood Senate candidates in three states in 2022: New South Wales, Queensland, and Victoria.

The SEP opposes the Victorian Socialists and Socialist Alliance, describing them as "pseudo-left".

In October 2026, the party announced their intention to run in the 2026 Victorian state election.

== See also ==
- Socialism in Australia
