= Peter Pyke =

Australian politician

Member of the Queensland Legislative Assembly for Mount Ommaney
- In office 19 September 1992 – 15 July 1995
- Preceded by: New seat
- Succeeded by: Bob Harper

Personal details
- Born: Peter Malcolm Pyke; 15 November 1950 (age 75) London, England
- Party: Katter's Australian (since 2012)
- Other political affiliations: Labor (1992-1998)
- Occupation: Police officer, Electrician

Peter Malcolm Pyke (born 15 November 1950) is an Australian politician. Pyke was born in London and served with the Queensland Police Service for 16 years before entering parliament, heading the first dedicated police unit to focus on violence against women and serving as an instructor at the Queensland Police Academy. He came to public attention as a campaigner against corruption in the service, making a 100-page submission to the Fitzgerald Royal Commission of Inquiry and commenting regularly to the media on the inquiry's proceedings.

Pyke was elected to the Legislative Assembly of Queensland as the Labor member for the newly created seat of Mount Ommaney at the 1992 state election. Mount Ommaney was predominantly based on the former safe Liberal seat of Sherwood which had been held for 11 years by former barrister and Liberal Party leader Angus Innes. Pyke lost his seat at the 1995 state election, at which he was defeated by Bob Harper of the Liberal Party.

In 1993, members of the Queensland Police Service launched an unsuccessful prosecution against Pyke, accusing him of assaulting and depriving the liberty of Brentus Noel Whittaker. The expense of contesting the proceedings forced Pyke to sell his home. Pyke claimed the episode left him in fear for his family's safety after he was threatened by a stranger at a bottle shop on 28 June 1996, shortly after he discussed lodging a complaint with the Crime and Justice Commission over the fabrication of charges against him by police officers.

Pyke attempted a political comeback by standing as an independent at the 2009 state election for the district of Toowoomba South. In June 2010 he announced the formation with former journalist and Liberal Party adviser Graham Higgins of a new political party, the Republican Democrats. In May 2011, Pyke announced his intention to join forces with and run for the Queensland Legislative Assembly for the district of Toowoomba North for Queensland Party which was formed by former Liberal parliamentarian Aidan McLindon in 2010.

In 2012 Peter Pyke ran for the seat of Toowoomba North for Katter's Australian Party and didn't succeed. Pyke was the third most popular candidate following Kerry Shine and Trevor Watts.

== Electoral history ==
Queensland Legislative Assembly
Election year	Electorate	Party	Votes	FP%	+/-	2PP%	+/-	Result
1992	Mount Ommaney	ALP	10,386	51.20	▲4.90	51.20	▲4.90	First
1995	Mount Ommaney	ALP	8,718	41.00	▼10.30	48.30	▼2.90	Second
1998	Mount Ommaney	Ind	1,692	7.40	▲7.40	N/A	N/A	Fourth
2009	Toowoomba South	Ind	1,308	4.50	▲4.50	N/A	N/A	Fourth
2012	Toowoomba North	KAP	3,485	11.64	▲11.64	N/A	N/A	Third

Toowoomba Regional Council
Election year	Electorate	Party	Votes	FP%	+/-	2PP%	+/-	Result
2016	Undivided	Ind	13,256	1.55	▲1.55	N/A	N/A	Eliminated

Parliament of Queensland
New seat	Member for Mount Ommaney; 1992–1995	Succeeded by Bob Harper
