= 2010 Australian House of Representatives election =

Australian House of Representatives elections, 2010
- 21 August 2010
- All 150 seats in the Australian House of Representatives; 76 seats needed for a majority
- Turnout: 93.2%
Party	Leader	Vote %	Seats	+/–
Labor	Julia Gillard	38.0%	72	−11
Liberal	Tony Abbott	30.4%	44	−11
Liberal National	John-Paul Langbroek	9.1%	21	New
National	Warren Truss	3.4%	6	−4
Greens	Bob Brown	11.8%	1	+1
National (WA)	Brendon Grylls	0.3%	1	+1
Country Liberal	Terry Mills	0.3%	1	+1
Independents	—	3.0%	4	+2
This lists parties that won seats. See the complete results below.
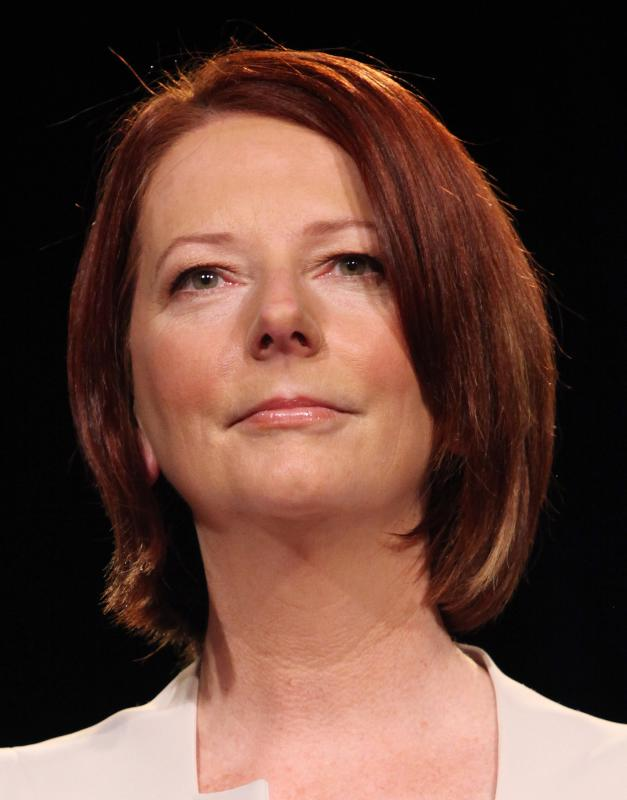

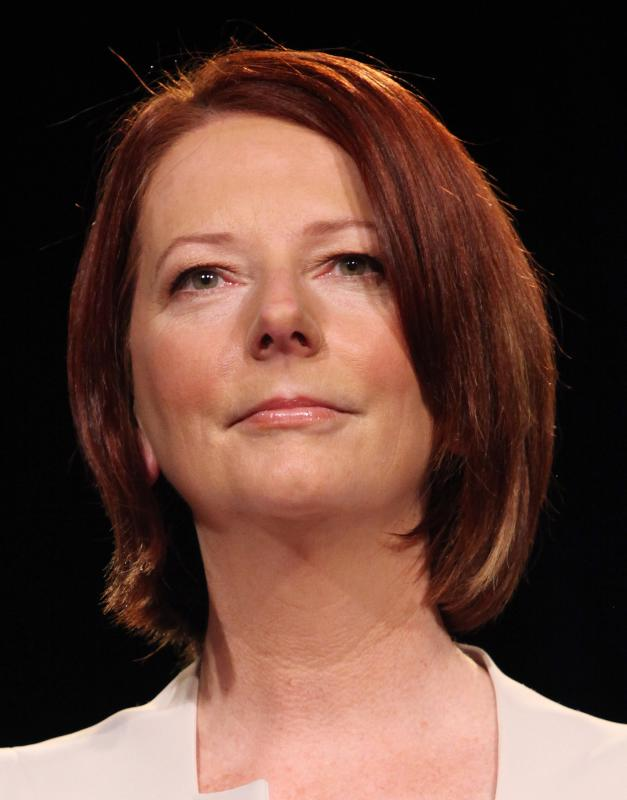
Prime Minister before	Prime Minister after
Julia Gillard; Labor	Julia Gillard; Labor

The following tables show state-by-state results in the Australian House of Representatives at the 2010 federal election, Labor 72, Coalition 72, Nationals (WA) 1, Australian Greens 1, with 4 independents.

== Australia ==
House of Representatives (IRV) — Turnout 93.21% (CV) — Informal 5.55%
Party	Votes	%	Swing	Seats	Change
Liberal	3,777,383	30.46	+0.76	44	▼1
Liberal National Party (QLD) (Note: The Liberal National Party was an amalgamation of the Liberal Party and National Party in Queensland. Change is compared to the coalition total in 2007.)	1,130,525	9.12	+0.60	21	▲8
National	419,286	3.43	−0.04	6	▼1
Country Liberal (NT)	38,335	0.31	−0.01	1	▲1
Coalition	5,365,529	43.32	+1.31	72	▲7
Australian Labor Party	4,711,363	37.99	−5.40	72	▼11
Australian Greens	1,458,998	11.76	+3.97	1	▲1
Independents	312,496	2.52	+0.30	4 (Note: The independents were Bob Katter (Kennedy, Qld), Rob Oakeshott (Lyne, NSW), Andrew Wilkie (Denison, Tas) and Tony Windsor (New England, NSW).)	▲2
Family First Party	279,330	2.25	+0.26		
Christian Democratic Party	83,009	0.67	−0.17		
National (WA) (Note: The National Party of Western Australia prior to and subsequent to the election were not in the federal Coalition agreement. Nationals WA MP Tony Crook stated that he was a crossbencher, and has said: "In every news report and press report we see, my number is being allocated in with the Coalition and it shouldn't be". Thus, the party has been counted separately from the Coalition totals.)	43,101	0.34	+0.20	1	▲1
One Nation	27,184	0.22	−0.04		
Liberal Democratic Party	24,262	0.20	+0.06		
Australian Democrats	22,376	0.18	−0.54		
Secular Party of Australia	12,752	0.10	+0.10		
Australian Sex Party	11,263	0.09	+0.09		
Socialist Equality Party	11,160	0.09	+0.06		
Socialist Alliance	9,348	0.08	+0.01		
Citizens Electoral Council	8,017	0.06	−0.16		
Democratic Labor Party	5,212	0.04	−0.01		
The Climate Sceptics	4,339	0.03	+0.03		
Australia First Party	3,670	0.03	+0.03		
Non-Custodial Parents Party	2,835	0.02	+0.01		
Building Australia Party	1,497	0.01	+0.01		
Carers Alliance	1,458	0.01	+0.01		
Communist Alliance	656	0.01	+0.01		
Others	2,508	0.02	+0.01		
Total	12,402,363			150	
Two-party-preferred vote
Australian Labor Party	6,216,445	50.12	−2.58	72	▼11
Liberal/National Coalition	6,185,918	49.88	+2.58	72	▲7
Invalid/blank votes	729,304	5.55	+1.60		
Registered voters/turnout	14,086,869	93.22			
Source: Commonwealth Election 2010

Preference flows

- Greens − Labor 78.8% (-0.9) to Coalition 21.2% (+0.9)
- Family First − Coalition 59.8% (-0.5) to Labor 40.2% (+0.5)
- Christian Democrats − Coalition 73.5% (+3.9) to Labor 26.5% (-3.9)
- Nationals WA − Coalition 75.9% (-5.1) to Labor 24.1% (+5.1)
- Independent candidates − Coalition 56.5% (+1.9) to Labor 43.5% (-1.9)

== New South Wales ==
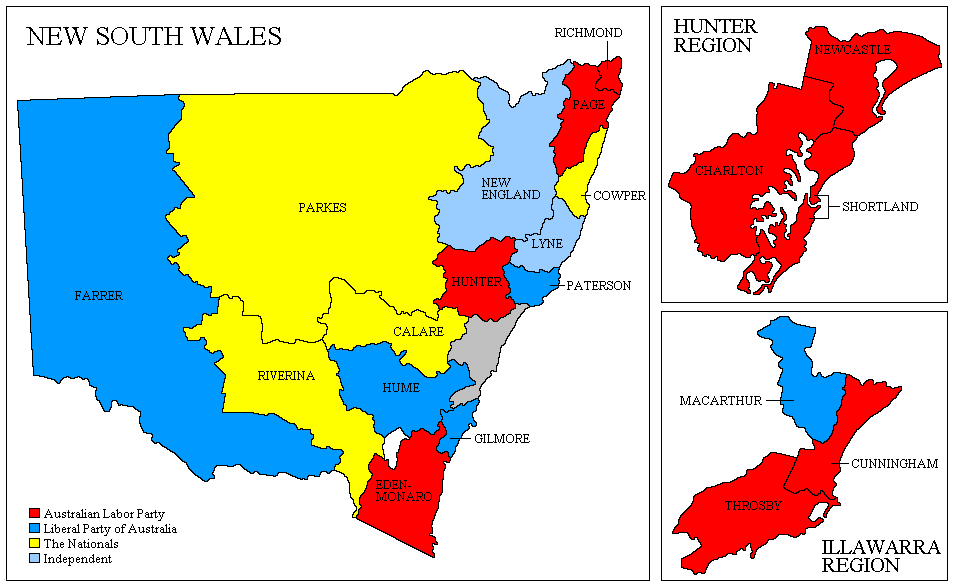
Electoral divisions: New South Wales

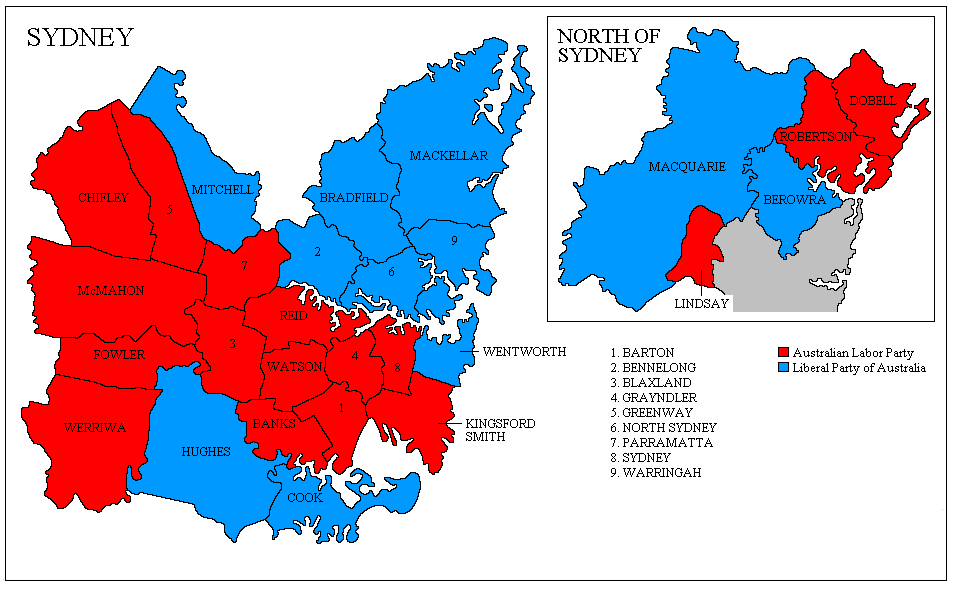
Electoral divisions: Sydney area

Turnout 93.32% (CV) — Informal 6.83%
Party	Votes	%	Swing	Seats	Change
Liberal	1,470,146	36.67	+4.04	16	▲1
National	317,867	7.93	+0.02	4	▼1
Coalition	1,788,013	44.60	+4.06	20	Steady
Australian Labor Party	1,494,490	37.28	−6.86	26	▼2
Australian Greens	410,405	10.24	+2.35		
Independents	172,921	4.31	+1.00	2	▲1
Christian Democratic Party	54,544	1.36	−0.56		
One Nation	19,182	0.48	+0.27		
Family First Party	17,453	0.44	−0.43		
Australian Democrats	11,409	0.28	+0.01		
Socialist Equality Party	9,106	0.23	+0.15		
Liberal Democratic Party	8,928	0.22	+0.10		
Secular Party of Australia	3,529	0.09	+0.09		
Socialist Alliance	3,484	0.09	+0.03		
Australia First Party	3,375	0.08	+0.08		
Australian Sex Party	3,180	0.08	+0.08		
Non-Custodial Parents Party	2,835	0.07	+0.05		
Building Australia Party	1,497	0.04	+0.04		
Carers Alliance	1,458	0.04	+0.04		
Citizens Electoral Council	1,187	0.03	−0.19		
Communist Alliance	656	0.02	+0.02		
The Climate Sceptics	275	0.01	+0.01		
Others	1,391	0.03	+0.01		
Total	4,009,318			48	▼1 (Note: The abolished district was Lowe (Labor).)
Two-party-preferred vote
Australian Labor Party	1,958,077	48.84	–4.84	26	▼2
Liberal/National Coalition	2,051,241	51.16	+4.84	20	Steady
Invalid/blank votes	293,763	6.83	+1.88		
Registered voters/turnout	4,610,795	93.33			
Source: Commonwealth Election 2010

== Victoria ==
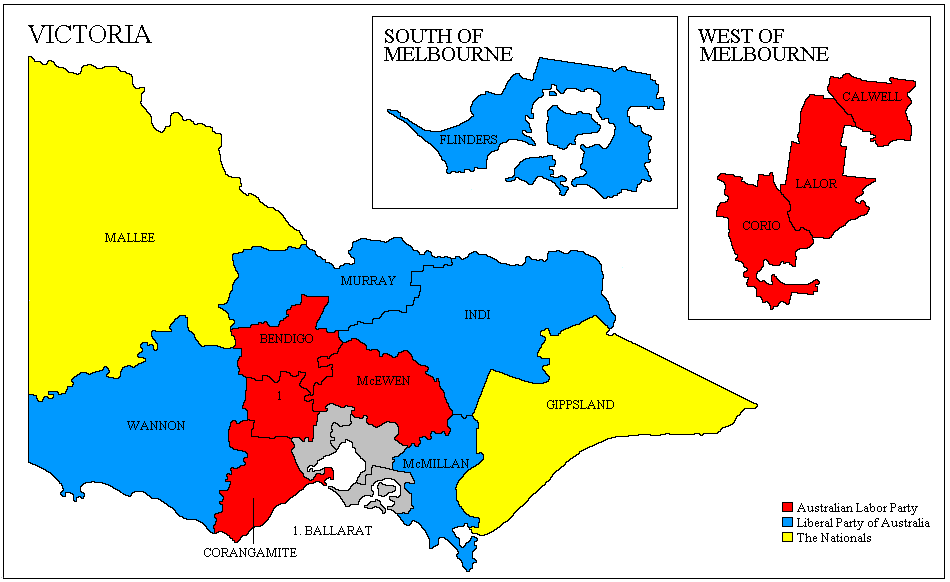
Electoral divisions: Victoria

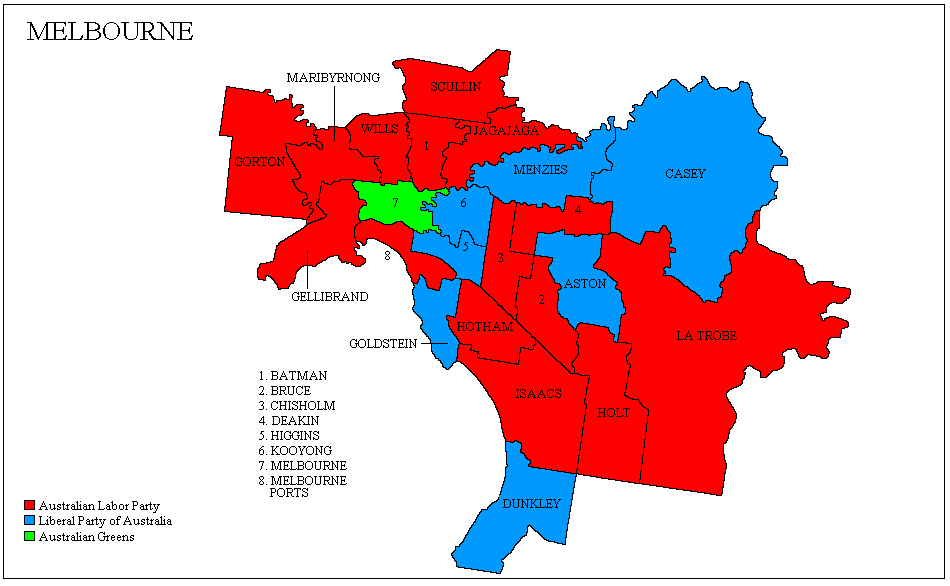
Electoral divisions: Melbourne area

Turnout 93.46% (CV) — Informal 4.50%
Party	Votes	%	Swing	Seats	Change
Australian Labor Party	1,361,416	42.81	–1.88	22	▲1
Liberal	1,159,301	36.45	–1.64	12	▼2
National	101,419	3.19	+0.17	2	Steady
Coalition	1,260,720	39.64	–1.47	14	▼2
Australian Greens	402,482	12.66	+4.49	1	▲1
Family First Party	99,747	3.14	+0.12		
Independents	26,525	0.83	−0.17		
Liberal Democratic Party	7,839	0.25	+0.15		
Australian Sex Party	6,023	0.19	+0.19		
Secular Party of Australia	5,239	0.16	+0.16		
Australian Democrats	3,947	0.12	−1.10		
Socialist Alliance	2,225	0.07	+0.00		
Socialist Equality Party	1,656	0.05	+0.03		
Citizens Electoral Council	922	0.03	−0.24		
Christian Democratic Party	632	0.02	−0.02		
Australia First Party	295	0.01	+0.01		
Others	516	0.02	+0.00		
Total	3,180,184			37	
Two-party-preferred vote
Australian Labor Party	1,758,982	55.31	+1.04	22	▲1
Liberal/National Coalition	1,421,202	44.69	–1.04	14	▼2
Invalid/blank votes	149,699	4.50	+1.25		
Registered voters/turnout	3,561,873	93.49			
Source: Commonwealth Election 2010

== Queensland ==
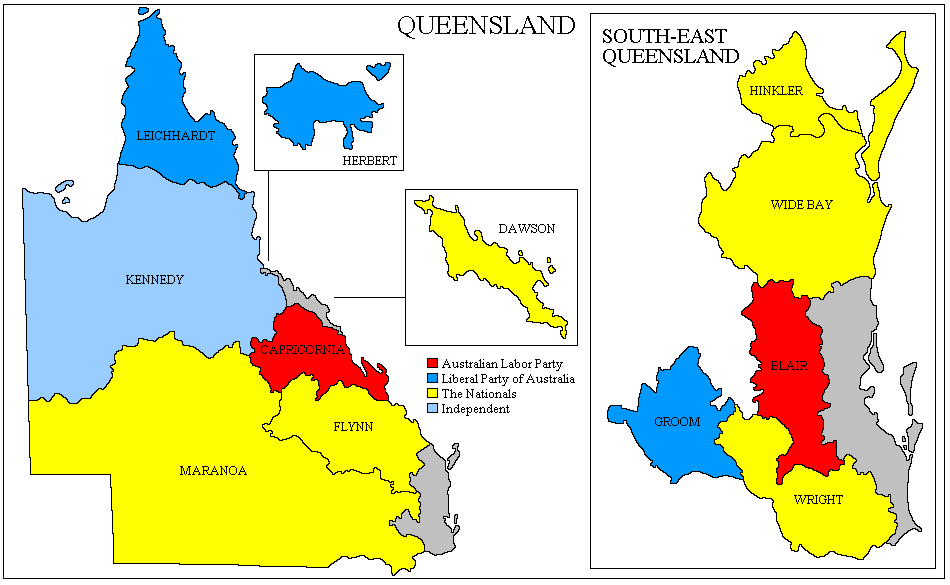
Electoral divisions: Queensland

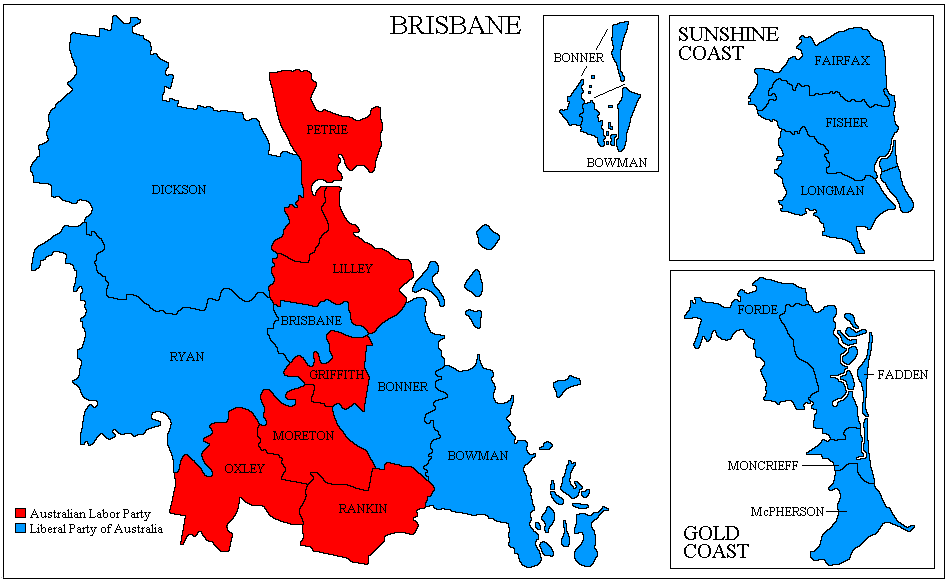
Electoral divisions: Brisbane area

Turnout 92.71% (CV) — Informal 5.45%
Party	Votes	%	Swing	Seats	Change
Liberal National Party	1,130,525	47.42	+2.95	21	▲8
Australian Labor Party	800,712	33.58	–9.33	8	▼7
Australian Greens	260,471	10.92	+5.29		
Family First Party	92,794	3.89	+1.62		
Independents	83,310	3.49	+0.50	1	Steady
Liberal Democratic Party	4,662	0.20	+0.05		
Democratic Labor Party	4,590	0.19	+0.19		
One Nation	3,921	0.16	−0.20		
Citizens Electoral Council	1,462	0.06	−0.09		
Socialist Alliance	717	0.03	−0.02		
Secular Party of Australia	414	0.02	+0.02		
Others	601	0.03	+0.03		
Total	2,384,179			30	▲1 (Note: The new seat was Wright.)
Two-party-preferred vote
Liberal National Party	1,314,675	55.14	+5.58	21	▲8
Australian Labor Party	1,069,504	44.86	–5.58	8	▼7
Invalid/blank votes		137,395	5.45	+1.89	
Registered voters/turnout		2,719,360	92.73		
Source: Commonwealth Election 2010

== Western Australia ==
Electoral divisions: Western Australia

Turnout 92.86% (CV) — Informal 4.82%
Party	Votes	%	Swing	Seats	Change
Liberal	566,145	47.02	+0.71	11	Steady
Labor	375,381	31.18	–5.62	3	▼1
Greens	158,117	13.13	+4.20		
National	43,101	3.58	+2.44	1	▲1
Christian Democrats	27,833	2.31	+0.20		
Family First	20,698	1.72	+0.51		
Independents	5,079	0.42	–1.27		
Sex Party	2,060	0.17	+0.17		
One Nation	1,471	0.12	−1.03		
Socialist Alliance	1,280	0.11	+0.01		
Citizens Electoral Council	1,277	0.11	−0.15		
Democratic Labour	622	0.05	+0.05		
Climate Sceptics	539	0.04	+0.04		
Socialist Equality	398	0.03	+0.02		
Total	1,204,001			15	
Two-party-preferred vote
Liberal	679,140	56.41	+3.15	11	Steady
Labor	524,861	43.59	–3.15	3	▼1
Invalid/blank votes		60,967	4.82	+0.97	
Registered voters/turnout		1,362,534	92.84		
Source: Commonwealth Election 2010

== South Australia ==
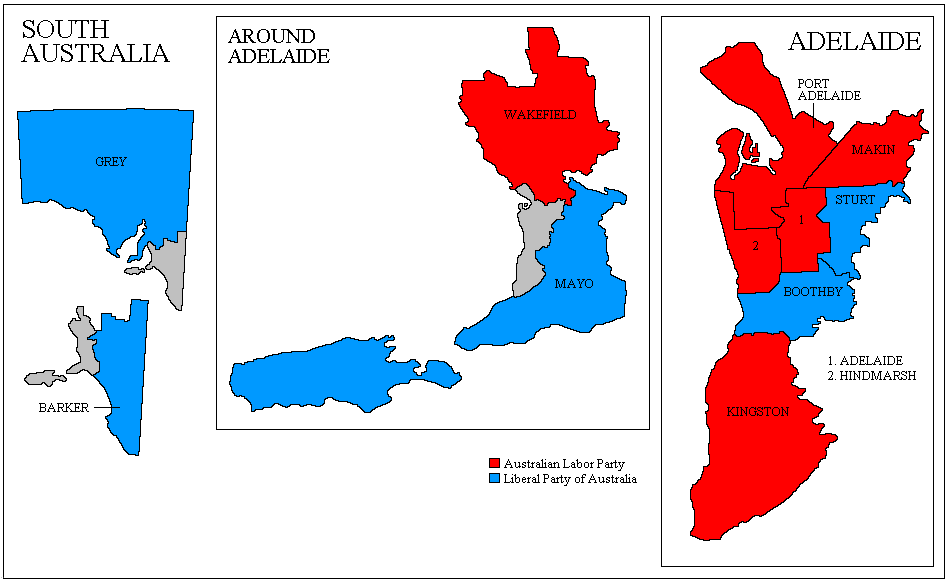
Electoral divisions: South Australia

Turnout 93.80% (CV) — Informal 5.46%
Party	Votes	%	Swing	Seats	Change
Australian Labor Party	399,279	40.74	–2.44	6	Steady
Liberal	394,003	40.21	–1.55	5	Steady
Australian Greens	117,364	11.98	+5.03		
Family First Party	48,638	4.96	+0.91		
Australian Democrats	7,020	0.72	−0.79		
Independents	5,086	0.52	–0.18		
The Climate Sceptics	3,525	0.36	+0.36		
Liberal Democratic Party	2,833	0.29	+0.12		
One Nation	1,105	0.11	−0.06		
Socialist Alliance	786	0.08	+0.08		
Secular Party of Australia	310	0.03	+0.03		
Total	979,949			11	
Two-party-preferred vote
Australian Labor Party	521,115	53.18	+0.78	6	Steady
Liberal	458,834	46.82	–0.78	5	Steady
Invalid/blank votes		56,565	5.46	+1.68	
Registered voters/turnout		1,104,698	93.83		
Source: Commonwealth Election 2010

== Tasmania ==
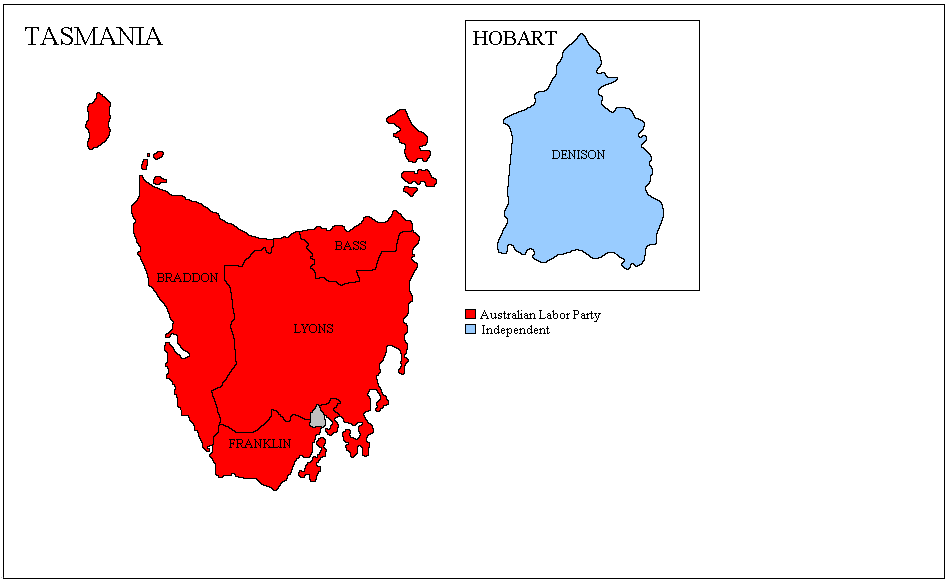
Electoral divisions: Tasmania

Turnout 95.08% (CV) — Informal 4.04%
Party	Votes	%	Swing	Seats	Change
Australian Labor Party	143,796	43.95	+1.18	4	▼1
Liberal	109,908	33.60	–4.62	0	Steady
Australian Greens	55,042	16.82	+3.32		
Independents	15,627	4.78	+2.56	1	▲1
Secular Party of Australia	1,085	0.33	+0.33		
Socialist Alliance	856	0.26	+0.00		
Citizens Electoral Council	838	0.26	−0.31		
Total	327,152			5	
Two-party-preferred vote
Australian Labor Party	198,332	60.62	+4.41	4	▼1
Liberal	128,830	39.38	–4.41	0	Steady
Invalid/blank votes		13,791	4.04	+1.12	
Registered voters/turnout		358,609	95.07		
Source: Commonwealth Election 2010

== Territories ==
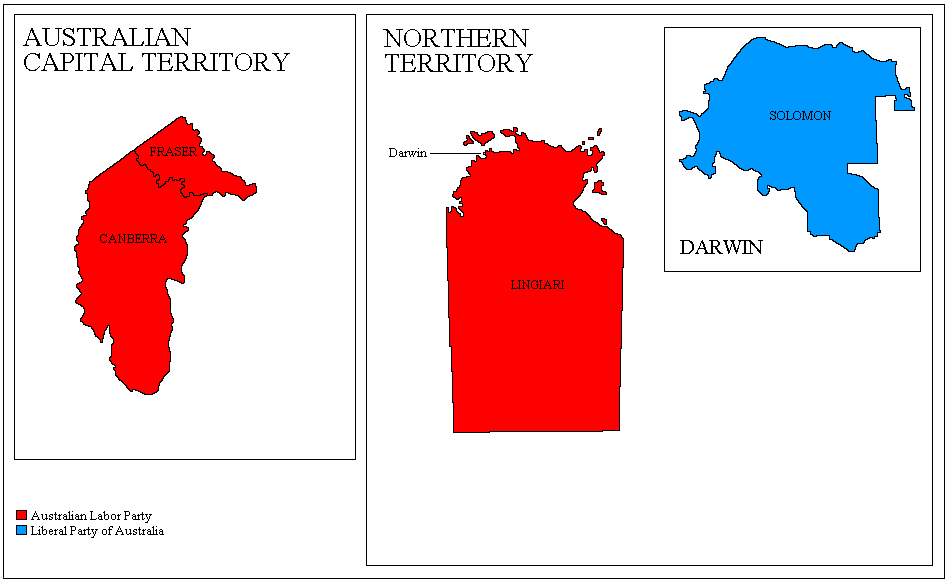
Electoral divisions: Territories

=== Australian Capital Territory ===
House of Representatives (IRV) — Turnout 94.74% (CV) — Informal 4.66%
Party	Votes	%	Swing	Seats	Change
Australian Labor Party	100,700	45.02	–6.08	2	Steady
Liberal	77,880	34.81	+1.58	0	Steady
Australian Greens	42,942	19.20	+6.04		
Secular Party of Australia	2,175	0.97	+0.97		
Total	223,697			2	
Two-party-preferred vote
Australian Labor Party	137,948	61.67	–1.73	2	Steady
Liberal	85,749	38.33	+1.73	0	Steady
Invalid/blank votes		10,926	4.66	+2.35	
Registered voters/turnout		247,941	94.63		
Source: Commonwealth Election 2010

=== Northern Territory ===
House of Representatives (IRV) — Turnout 82.71% (CV) — Informal 6.19%
Party	Votes	%	Swing	Seats	Change
Country Liberal Party	38,335	40.83	–0.20	1	▲1
Australian Labor Party	35,589	37.91	–9.74	1	▼1
Australian Greens	12,175	12.97	+4.92		
Independents	3,948	4.21	+1.55		
Citizens Electoral Council	2,331	2.48	+2.23		
One Nation	1,505	1.60	+1.60		
Total	93,883			2	
Two-party-preferred vote
Australian Labor Party	47,636	50.74	–4.67	1	▼1
Country Liberal Party	46,247	49.26	+4.67	1	▲1
Invalid/blank votes		6,198	6.19	+2.34	
Registered voters/turnout		121,059	82.67		
Source: Commonwealth Election 2010

== Two party preferred preference flow ==
House of Representatives (IRV – votes
Party	Liberal National coalition			Labor Party		
Party	Votes	%	±	Votes	%	±
Greens	308,676	21.16%		1,150,322	78.84%	
Family First Party	167,091	59.82%		112,239	40.18%	
Christian Democratic Party	60,989	73.47%		22,020	26.53%	
One Nation	14,894	54.79%		12,290	45.21%	
Liberal Democratic Party	17,485	72.07%'		6,777	27.93%	
Democratic Labour Party	2,135	40.96%		3,077	59.04%	
Australia First Party	1,887	51.42%		1,783	48.58%	
Citizens Electoral Council	4,999	62.35%		3,018	37.65%	
Socialist Alliance	2,490	26.64%		6,858	73.36%	
Socialist Equality Party	4,443	39.81%		6,717	60.19%	
Australian Sex Party	4,497	39.93%	–	6,766	60.07%	–
Secular Party of Australia	6,169	48.38%		6,583	51.62%	
Australian Democrats	9,656	43.15%		12,720	56.85%	
Non-Custodial Parents Party	1,272	44.87%		1,563	55.13%	–
Building Australia Party	808	53.97%	–	689	46.03%	–
Carers Alliance	659	45.20%	–	799	54.80%	–
Communist Alliance	194	29.57%	–	462	70.43%	–
The Climate Sceptics	2,377	54.78%	–	1,962	45.22%	–
Independents	176,457	56.47%		136,039	43.53%	
Total	14,659,042	100.00		151	Steady	
Two-party-preferred vote
Liberal/National Coalition	6,185,918	49.88%				
Labor	6,216,445	50.12%				
Invalid/blank votes				–	–	–
Turnout				–	–	–
Registered voters		–	–	–	–	–
Source: AEC for both votes

== See also ==
- 2010 Australian federal election
- Results of the 2010 Australian federal election (Senate)
- Post-election pendulum for the 2010 Australian federal election
- Members of the Australian House of Representatives, 2010–2013
