= Results of the 2010 Australian federal election in New South Wales =

2010 Australian federal election (New South Wales)
- 21 August 2010

All 48 New South Wales seats in the Australian House of Representatives and 6 (of the 12) seats in the Australian Senate
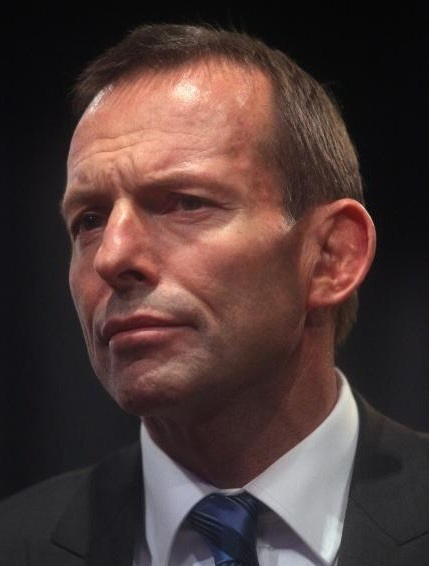

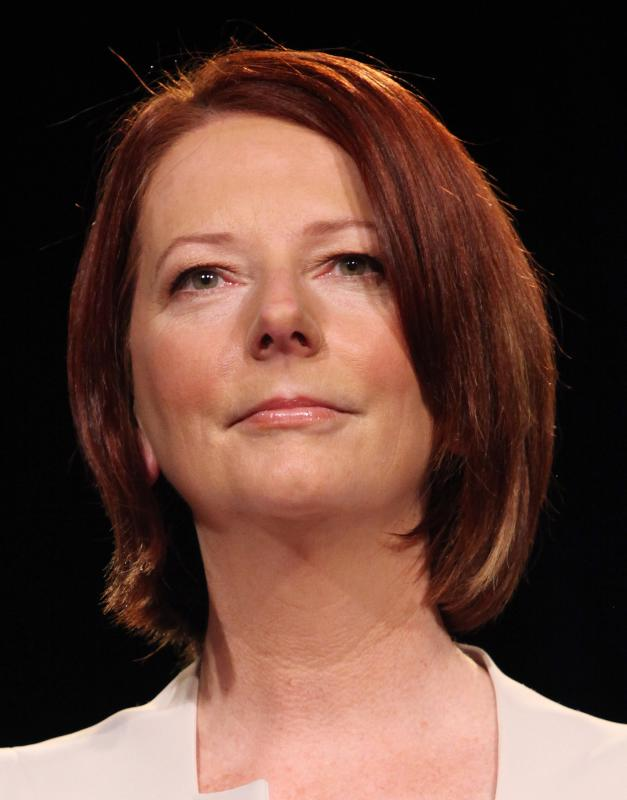
	First party	Second party
Leader	Tony Abbott	Julia Gillard
Party	Liberal/National coalition	Labor
Last election	15 seats	28 seats
Seats won	20 seats	26 seats
Seat change	▲5	▼2
Popular vote	1,788,013	1,494,490
Percentage	44.60%	37.28%
Swing	▲4.07	▼6.86
TPP	51.16%	48.84%
TPP swing	▲4.84	▼4.84
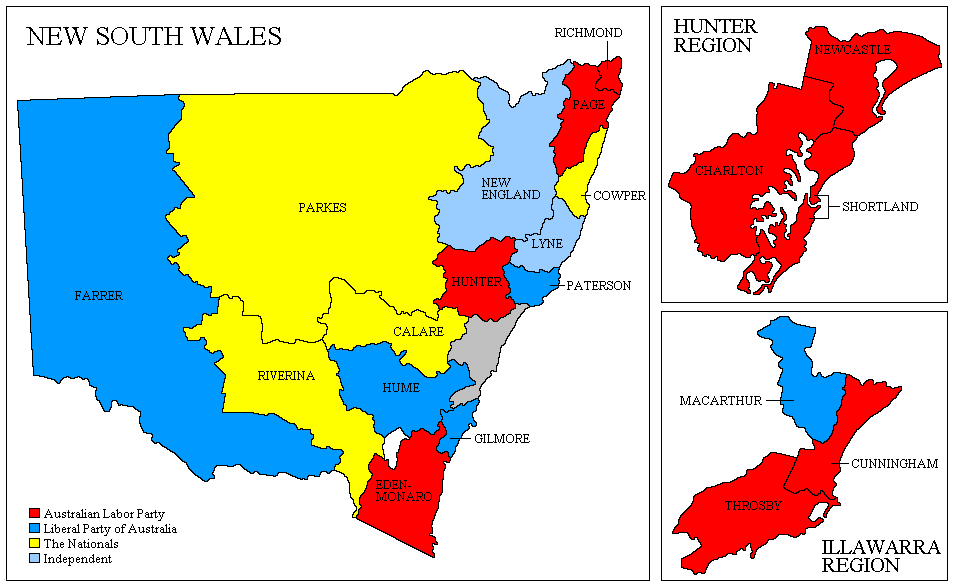
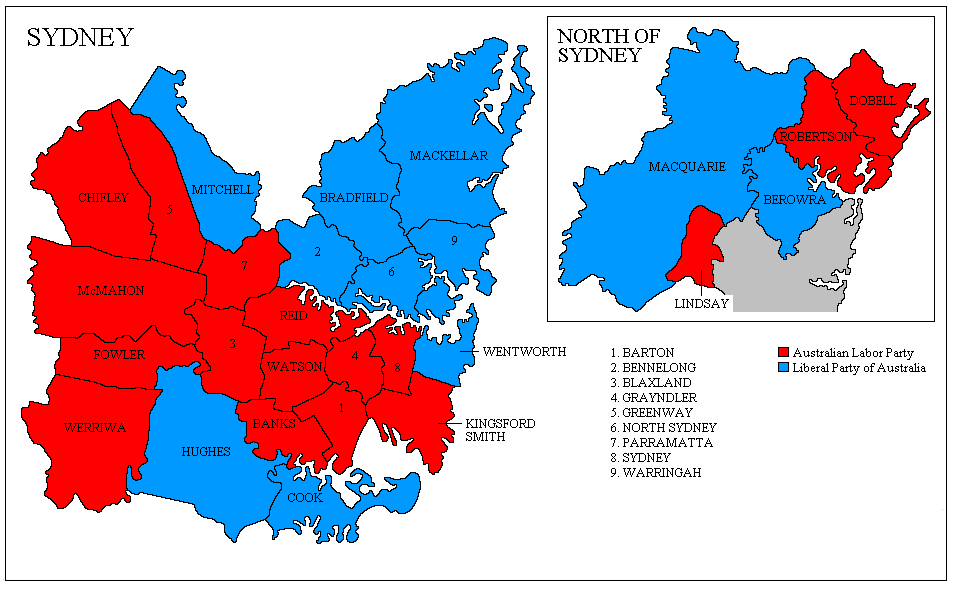

This is a list of electoral division results for the Australian 2010 federal election in the state of New South Wales.

This election was held using instant-runoff voting. At this election, there were three "turn-overs" in New South Wales. Labor won the seats of Banks, Reid and Robertson despite the Liberals finishing first.

== Overall ==
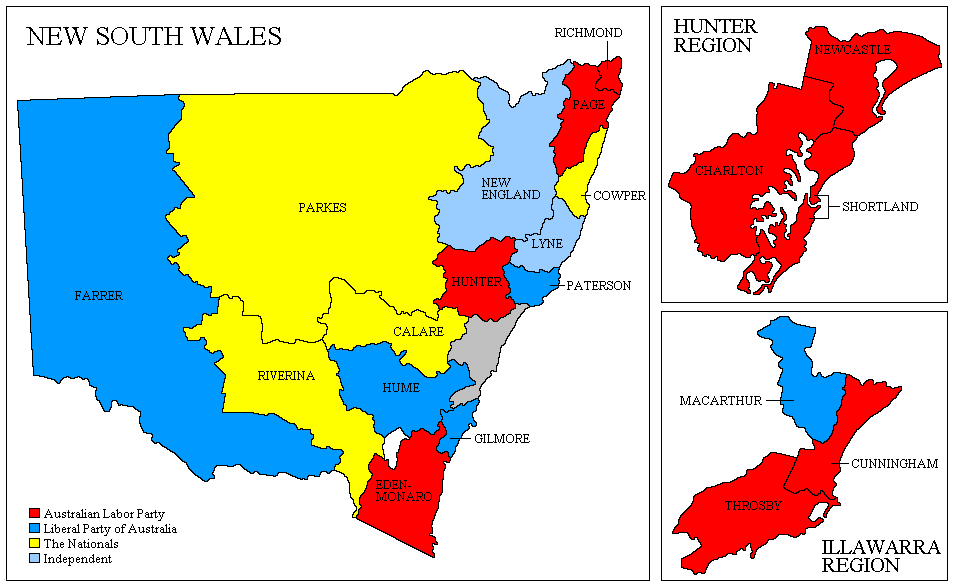
Electoral divisions: New South Wales

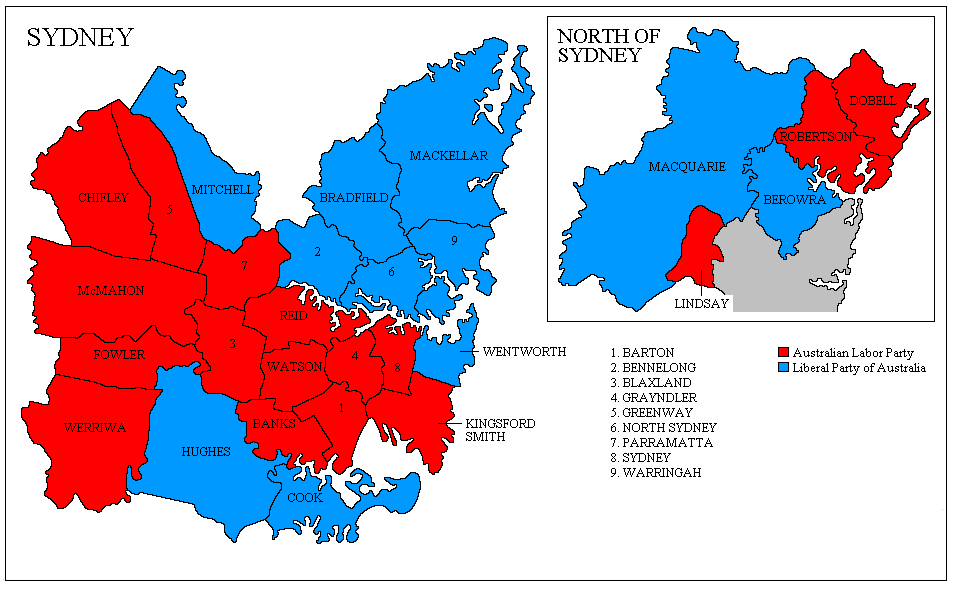
Electoral divisions: Sydney area

Turnout 93.32% (CV) — Informal 6.83%
Party	Votes	%	Swing	Seats	Change
Liberal	1,470,146	36.67	+4.04	16	▲1
National	317,867	7.93	+0.02	4	▼1
Coalition	1,788,013	44.60	+4.06	20	Steady
Australian Labor Party	1,494,490	37.28	−6.86	26	▼2
Australian Greens	410,405	10.24	+2.35		
Independents	172,921	4.31	+1.00	2 (Note: The independents were Rob Oakeshott (Lyne) and Tony Windsor (New England).)	▲1
Christian Democratic Party	54,544	1.36	−0.56		
One Nation	19,182	0.48	+0.27		
Family First Party	17,453	0.44	−0.43		
Australian Democrats	11,409	0.28	+0.01		
Socialist Equality Party	9,106	0.23	+0.15		
Liberal Democratic Party	8,928	0.22	+0.10		
Secular Party of Australia	3,529	0.09	+0.09		
Socialist Alliance	3,484	0.09	+0.03		
Australia First Party	3,375	0.08	+0.08		
Australian Sex Party	3,180	0.08	+0.08		
Non-Custodial Parents Party	2,835	0.07	+0.05		
Building Australia Party	1,497	0.04	+0.04		
Carers Alliance	1,458	0.04	+0.04		
Citizens Electoral Council	1,187	0.03	−0.19		
Communist Alliance	656	0.02	+0.02		
The Climate Sceptics	275	0.01	+0.01		
Others	1,391	0.03	+0.01		
Total	4,009,318			48	▼1 (Note: The abolished district was Lowe (Labor).)
Two-party-preferred vote
Australian Labor Party	1,958,077	48.84	–4.84	26	▼2
Liberal/National Coalition	2,051,241	51.16	+4.84	20	Steady
Invalid/blank votes	293,763	6.83	+1.88		
Registered voters/turnout	4,610,795	93.33			
Source: Commonwealth Election 2010

== Results by division ==
=== Banks ===
2010 Australian federal election: Banks
Party	Candidate	Votes	%	±%
Liberal	Ron Delezio	38,178	45.52	+10.48
Labor	Daryl Melham	36,034	42.96	−10.76
Greens	Paul Spight	8,062	9.61	+3.21
One Nation	Michael Parsons	1,595	1.90	+1.90
Total formal votes		83,869	91.63	−2.61
Informal votes		7,665	8.37	+2.61
Turnout		91,534	92.68	−1.80
Two-party-preferred result
Labor	Daryl Melham	43,150	51.45	−8.92
Liberal	Ron Delezio	40,719	48.55	+8.92
Labor hold		Swing	−8.92	

=== Barton ===
2010 Australian federal election: Barton
Party	Candidate	Votes	%	±%
Labor	Robert McClelland	38,149	48.48	−8.80
Liberal	John La Mela	31,998	40.67	+9.76
Greens	Simone Francis	8,536	10.85	+2.61
Total formal votes		78,683	90.18	−3.25
Informal votes		8,572	9.82	+3.25
Turnout		87,255	91.61	−3.44
Two-party-preferred result
Labor	Robert McClelland	44,742	56.86	−8.08
Liberal	John La Mela	33,941	43.14	+8.08
Labor hold		Swing	−8.08	

=== Bennelong ===
2010 Australian federal election: Bennelong
Party	Candidate	Votes	%	±%
Liberal	John Alexander	41,582	48.53	+3.04
Labor	Maxine McKew	31,803	37.12	−8.21
Greens	Lindsay Peters	6,808	7.95	+2.42
Christian Democrats	Julie Worsley	1,824	2.13	+0.84
Sex Party	Sue Raye	1,105	1.29	+1.29
One Nation	Victor Waterson	725	0.85	+0.55
Family First	Stephen Chavura	570	0.67	+0.34
Carers Alliance	Mary Mockler	478	0.56	+0.56
Liberal Democrats	Terje Petersen	344	0.40	+0.30
Climate Sceptics	Bill Pounder	275	0.32	+0.32
Building Australia	Martin Levine	170	0.20	+0.20
Total formal votes		85,684	92.63	−1.15
Informal votes		6,820	7.37	+1.15
Turnout		92,504	93.53	−1.47
Two-party-preferred result
Liberal	John Alexander	45,518	53.12	+4.52
Labor	Maxine McKew	40,166	46.88	−4.52
Liberal gain from Labor		Swing	+4.52	

=== Berowra ===
2010 Australian federal election: Berowra
Party	Candidate	Votes	%	±%
Liberal	Philip Ruddock	51,416	59.98	+5.44
Labor	Michael Stove	18,901	22.05	−7.88
Greens	Toni Wright-Turner	9,762	11.39	+2.57
Independent	Mick Gallagher	2,455	2.86	+1.27
Christian Democrats	Steve Evans	2,350	2.74	+0.21
Family First	Christian Ellis	840	0.98	−0.28
Total formal votes		85,724	95.41	+0.09
Informal votes		4,123	4.59	−0.09
Turnout		89,847	94.46	−0.89
Two-party-preferred result
Liberal	Philip Ruddock	56,752	66.20	+6.19
Labor	Michael Stove	28,972	33.80	−6.19
Liberal hold		Swing	+6.19	

=== Blaxland ===
2010 Australian federal election: Blaxland
Party	Candidate	Votes	%	±%
Labor	Jason Clare	37,641	50.98	−8.78
Liberal	Mark Majewski	24,583	33.30	+7.11
Greens	Malikeh Michels	4,625	6.26	+0.69
Independent	Abdul Charaf	2,131	2.89	+2.89
Socialist Equality	Richard Phillips	2,058	2.79	+2.79
One Nation	Bob Vinnicombe	1,351	1.83	+0.74
Independent	David Ball	1,153	1.56	+1.56
Communist League	Ronald Poulsen	288	0.39	+0.39
Total formal votes		73,830	85.94	−5.17
Informal votes		12,081	14.06	+5.17
Turnout		85,911	90.10	−2.65
Two-party-preferred result
Labor	Jason Clare	45,948	62.23	−4.42
Liberal	Mark Majewski	27,882	37.77	+4.42
Labor hold		Swing	−4.42	

=== Bradfield ===
2010 Australian federal election: Bradfield
Party	Candidate	Votes	%	±%
Liberal	Paul Fletcher	56,143	64.45	+5.06
Labor	Sarah Gallard	16,742	19.22	−6.95
Greens	Susie Gemmell	14,231	16.34	+5.28
Total formal votes		87,116	95.90	−0.13
Informal votes		3,722	4.10	+0.13
Turnout		90,838	93.41	−0.64
Two-party-preferred result
Liberal	Paul Fletcher	59,397	68.18	+4.32
Labor	Sarah Gallard	27,719	31.82	−4.32
Liberal hold		Swing	+4.32	

=== Calare ===
2010 Australian federal election: Calare
Party	Candidate	Votes	%	±%
National	John Cobb	46,775	52.41	+25.91
Labor	Kevin Duffy	25,926	29.05	−4.42
Greens	Jeremy Buckingham	5,354	6.00	+1.82
Independent	Paul Blanch	4,137	4.64	+4.64
Independent	Karen Romano	3,276	3.67	+3.67
Christian Democrats	Jessyka Norsworthy	1,957	2.19	+1.65
Independent	Macgregor Ross	1,817	2.04	+2.04
Total formal votes		89,242	95.07	−1.31
Informal votes		4,631	4.93	+1.31
Turnout		93,873	95.30	−1.12
Two-party-preferred result
National	John Cobb	54,209	60.74	+7.28
Labor	Kevin Duffy	35,033	39.26	−7.28
National hold		Swing	+7.28	

=== Charlton ===
2010 Australian federal election: Charlton
Party	Candidate	Votes	%	±%
Labor	Greg Combet	44,159	53.15	+0.09
Liberal	John McDonald	25,514	30.71	−0.89
Greens	Ian McKenzie	7,339	8.83	+0.75
Independent	Patrick Barry	2,846	3.43	+1.94
Christian Democrats	Mitchell Pickstone	2,341	2.82	+0.42
Citizens Electoral Council	Ann Lawler	881	1.06	+0.71
Total formal votes		83,080	93.08	−2.25
Informal votes		6,176	6.92	+2.25
Turnout		89,256	94.47	−1.53
Two-party-preferred result
Labor	Greg Combet	52,064	62.67	−0.24
Liberal	John McDonald	31,016	37.33	+0.24
Labor hold		Swing	−0.24	

=== Chifley ===
2010 Australian federal election: Chifley
Party	Candidate	Votes	%	±%
Labor	Ed Husic	41,456	51.58	−11.60
Liberal	Venus Priest	24,369	30.32	+5.42
Greens	Debbie Robertson	6,776	8.43	+4.72
Christian Democrats	Dave Vincent	4,068	5.06	+1.72
One Nation	Louise Kedwell	1,585	1.97	+0.67
Democrats	Keith Darley	1,174	1.46	+1.46
Australia First	Terry Cooksley	943	1.17	+1.17
Total formal votes		80,371	88.84	−3.25
Informal votes		10,097	11.16	+3.25
Turnout		90,468	92.69	−0.98
Two-party-preferred result
Labor	Ed Husic	50,103	62.34	−7.34
Liberal	Venus Priest	30,268	37.66	+7.34
Labor hold		Swing	−7.34	

=== Cook ===
2010 Australian federal election: Cook
Party	Candidate	Votes	%	±%
Liberal	Scott Morrison	51,852	57.88	+5.73
Labor	Peter Scaysbrook	25,806	28.81	−7.46
Greens	Naomi Waizer	6,924	7.73	+1.54
Christian Democrats	Beth Smith	1,722	1.92	−0.38
Independent	Graeme Strang	1,568	1.75	+1.01
One Nation	Richard Putral	997	1.11	−0.09
Family First	Merelyn Foy	719	0.80	+0.08
Total formal votes		89,588	94.19	−2.00
Informal votes		5,528	5.81	+2.00
Turnout		95,116	94.41	−2.02
Two-party-preferred result
Liberal	Scott Morrison	56,138	62.66	+6.32
Labor	Peter Scaysbrook	33,450	37.34	−6.32
Liberal hold		Swing	+6.32	

=== Cowper ===
2010 Australian federal election: Cowper
Party	Candidate	Votes	%	±%
National	Luke Hartsuyker	43,242	50.77	+4.22
Labor	Paul Sekfy	23,696	27.82	−10.25
Independent	John Arkan	8,446	9.92	+9.92
Greens	Dominic King	7,745	9.09	−1.95
Christian Democrats	Deborah Lions	2,039	2.39	−0.48
Total formal votes		85,168	95.67	−0.36
Informal votes		3,857	4.33	+0.36
Turnout		89,025	94.06	−1.02
Two-party-preferred result
National	Luke Hartsuyker	50,477	59.27	+8.03
Labor	Paul Sekfy	34,691	40.73	−8.03
National hold		Swing	+8.03	

=== Cunningham ===
2010 Australian federal election: Cunningham
Party	Candidate	Votes	%	±%
Labor	Sharon Bird	43,769	49.17	−3.20
Liberal	Philip Clifford	29,241	32.85	+4.94
Greens	George Takacs	13,461	15.12	+0.90
Socialist Alliance	Jess Moore	1,303	1.46	+0.68
Non-Custodial Parents	John Flanagan	1,240	1.39	+0.85
Total formal votes		89,014	94.32	−1.77
Informal votes		5,359	5.68	+1.77
Turnout		94,373	93.72	−2.41
Two-party-preferred result
Labor	Sharon Bird	56,234	63.17	−3.70
Liberal	Philip Clifford	32,780	36.83	+3.70
Labor hold		Swing	−3.70	

=== Dobell ===
2010 Australian federal election: Dobell
Party	Candidate	Votes	%	±%
Labor	Craig Thomson	38,268	46.27	−0.08
Liberal	John McNamara	33,287	40.24	−2.05
Greens	Scott Rickard	7,121	8.61	+3.24
Family First	Gavin Brett	2,033	2.46	+0.75
Christian Democrats	Rhonda Avasalu	2,005	2.42	+0.54
Total formal votes		82,714	93.94	−1.74
Informal votes		5,333	6.06	+1.74
Turnout		88,047	94.01	−0.83
Two-party-preferred result
Labor	Craig Thomson	45,551	55.07	+1.14
Liberal	John McNamara	37,163	44.93	−1.14
Labor hold		Swing	+1.14	

=== Eden-Monaro ===
2010 Australian federal election: Eden-Monaro
Party	Candidate	Votes	%	±%
Labor	Mike Kelly	37,225	43.61	+0.30
Liberal	David Gazard	35,714	41.84	−2.87
Greens	Catherine Moore	8,296	9.72	+1.91
Liberal Democrats	Olga Quilty	1,152	1.35	+1.11
Independent	Ray Buckley	1,019	1.19	+1.19
Family First	Tom Gradwell	761	0.89	+0.18
Christian Democrats	Ursula Bennett	637	0.75	−0.36
Independent	Frank Fragiacomo	559	0.65	+0.65
Total formal votes		85,363	93.75	−2.52
Informal votes		5,690	6.25	+2.52
Turnout		91,053	94.39	−1.51
Two-party-preferred result
Labor	Mike Kelly	46,300	54.24	+1.95
Liberal	David Gazard	39,063	45.76	−1.95
Labor hold		Swing	+1.95	

=== Farrer ===
2010 Australian federal election: Farrer
Party	Candidate	Votes	%	±%
Liberal	Sussan Ley	42,646	51.41	−5.87
Labor	Christian Emmery	20,981	25.29	−7.39
Independent	Louise Burge	9,350	11.27	+11.27
Greens	Peter Carruthers	4,880	5.88	+1.05
Christian Democrats	James Male	2,664	3.21	+3.21
Secular	Mathew Crothers	1,099	1.32	+1.32
	Jason Clancy	724	0.87	+0.87
Democrats	Stephen Bingle	603	0.73	+0.73
Total formal votes		82,947	93.66	−2.51
Informal votes		5,611	6.34	+2.51
Turnout		88,558	94.15	−2.09
Two-party-preferred result
Liberal	Sussan Ley	53,513	64.51	+3.32
Labor	Christian Emmery	29,434	35.49	−3.32
Liberal hold		Swing	+3.32	

=== Fowler ===
2010 Australian federal election: Fowler
Party	Candidate	Votes	%	±%
Labor	Chris Hayes	40,636	52.86	−15.06
Liberal	Thomas Dang	28,402	36.94	+14.10
Greens	Signe Westerberg	5,144	6.69	+0.73
Socialist Equality	Mike Head	2,700	3.51	+3.51
Total formal votes		76,882	87.17	−4.35
Informal votes		11,314	12.83	+4.35
Turnout		88,196	92.29	−1.05
Two-party-preferred result
Labor	Chris Hayes	45,178	58.76	−13.81
Liberal	Thomas Dang	31,704	41.24	+13.81
Labor hold		Swing	−13.81	

=== Gilmore ===
2010 Australian federal election: Gilmore
Party	Candidate	Votes	%	±%
Liberal	Joanna Gash	44,050	50.93	+5.15
Labor	Neil Reilly	30,430	35.18	−6.83
Greens	Ben van der Wijngaart	8,279	9.57	+1.49
Christian Democrats	Bohdan Brumerskyj	2,310	2.67	+0.18
Family First	Elizabeth Cunningham	781	0.90	+0.50
Liberal Democrats	Don Keys	374	0.43	+0.28
Secular	Annette Williams	275	0.32	+0.32
Total formal votes		86,499	94.89	−0.87
Informal votes		4,658	5.11	+0.87
Turnout		91,157	94.64	−1.17
Two-party-preferred result
Liberal	Joanna Gash	47,850	55.32	+5.73
Labor	Neil Reilly	38,649	44.68	−5.73
Liberal notional gain from Labor		Swing	+5.73	

=== Grayndler ===
2010 Australian federal election: Grayndler
Party	Candidate	Votes	%	±%
Labor	Anthony Albanese	38,369	46.09	−9.37
Greens	Sam Byrne	21,555	25.90	+7.26
Liberal	Alexander Dore	20,178	24.24	+3.30
Democrats	Perry Garofani	1,074	1.29	−0.38
Socialist Equality	James Cogan	1,041	1.25	+0.86
Socialist Alliance	Pip Hinman	1,022	1.23	+1.18
Total formal votes		83,239	92.92	−1.10
Informal votes		6,344	7.08	+1.10
Turnout		89,583	91.31	−3.00
Two-party-preferred result
Labor	Anthony Albanese	58,789	70.63	−4.22
Liberal	Alexander Dore	24,450	29.37	+4.22
Two-candidate-preferred result
Labor	Anthony Albanese	45,138	54.23	−20.62
Greens	Sam Byrne	38,101	45.77	+45.77
Labor hold		Swing	N/A	

=== Greenway ===
2010 Australian federal election: Greenway
Party	Candidate	Votes	%	±%
Labor	Michelle Rowland	33,567	42.32	−7.36
Liberal	Jaymes Diaz	32,788	41.34	+2.05
Greens	Paul Taylor	4,769	6.01	+1.57
Christian Democrats	Allan Green	2,922	3.68	+0.86
Family First	Iris Muller	1,296	1.63	+0.38
Building Australia	John Baiada	815	1.03	+1.03
Australia First	Tony Pettitt	780	0.98	+0.98
Independent	Michael Santos	770	0.97	+0.97
Liberal Democrats	Joaquim de Lima	542	0.68	+0.51
Independent	Amarjit Tanda	530	0.67	+0.67
Democrats	Ronaldo Villaver	529	0.67	+0.67
Total formal votes		79,308	89.73	−4.09
Informal votes		9,075	10.27	+4.09
Turnout		88,383	94.20	+0.10
Two-party-preferred result
Labor	Michelle Rowland	40,355	50.88	−4.79
Liberal	Jaymes Diaz	38,953	49.12	+4.79
Labor notional hold		Swing	−4.79	

=== Hughes ===
2010 Australian federal election: Hughes
Party	Candidate	Votes	%	±%
Liberal	Craig Kelly	42,424	49.15	+2.67
Labor	Brent Thomas	32,611	37.78	−5.96
Greens	Susan Roberts	5,430	6.29	+0.93
Christian Democrats	Scott Nailon	2,112	2.45	−0.70
One Nation	Peter Bussa	1,599	1.85	+1.85
Family First	Stan Hurley	1,183	1.37	+0.45
Liberal Democrats	Don Nguyen	948	1.10	+1.01
Total formal votes		86,307	93.48	−2.08
Informal votes		6,020	6.52	+2.08
Turnout		92,327	94.22	−1.83
Two-party-preferred result
Liberal	Craig Kelly	47,619	55.17	+4.63
Labor	Brent Thomas	38,688	44.83	−4.63
Liberal hold		Swing	+4.63	

=== Hume ===
2010 Australian federal election: Hume
Party	Candidate	Votes	%	±%
Liberal	Alby Schultz	47,137	53.56	+12.96
Labor	Robin Saville	28,044	31.86	−5.06
Greens	Kevin Watchirs	6,737	7.65	+1.49
Family First	Charles Liptak	2,075	2.36	+0.53
Christian Democrats	Karen Buttigieg	1,546	1.76	+0.09
Democrats	Greg Butler	1,280	1.45	+1.36
Liberal Democrats	Lisa Milat	1,197	1.36	+1.36
Total formal votes		88,016	94.87	−1.56
Informal votes		4,764	5.13	+1.56
Turnout		92,780	94.97	−0.83
Two-party-preferred result
Liberal	Alby Schultz	51,679	58.72	+3.37
Labor	Robin Saville	36,337	41.28	−3.37
Liberal hold		Swing	+3.37	

=== Hunter ===
2010 Australian federal election: Hunter
Party	Candidate	Votes	%	±%
Labor	Joel Fitzgibbon	44,159	54.31	−5.28
National	Michael Johnsen	25,245	31.05	+3.83
Greens	Chris Parker	7,251	8.92	+2.60
One Nation	Jennifer Leayr	2,721	3.35	+3.35
Christian Democrats	Wayne Riley	1,938	2.38	+0.34
Total formal votes		81,314	93.79	−1.94
Informal votes		5,383	6.21	+1.94
Turnout		86,697	94.73	−1.23
Two-party-preferred result
Labor	Joel Fitzgibbon	50,803	62.48	−3.20
National	Michael Johnsen	30,511	37.52	+3.20
Labor hold		Swing	−3.20	

=== Kingsford Smith ===
2010 Australian federal election: Kingsford Smith
Party	Candidate	Votes	%	±%
Labor	Peter Garrett	35,957	43.83	−8.93
Liberal	Michael Feneley	33,836	41.25	+7.31
Greens	Lindsay Shurey	9,885	12.05	+1.63
Democrats	Josh Carmont	1,047	1.28	+1.28
One Nation	John Cunningham	728	0.89	+0.89
Socialist Equality	Zac Hambides	576	0.70	−0.56
Total formal votes		82,029	91.85	−2.84
Informal votes		7,280	8.15	+2.84
Turnout		89,309	91.37	−2.90
Two-party-preferred result
Labor	Peter Garrett	45,249	55.16	−8.10
Liberal	Michael Feneley	36,780	44.84	+8.10
Labor hold		Swing	−8.10	

=== Lindsay ===
2010 Australian federal election: Lindsay
Party	Candidate	Votes	%	±%
Labor	David Bradbury	37,076	44.55	−6.24
Liberal	Fiona Scott	36,114	43.39	+4.71
Greens	Suzie Wright	3,944	4.74	+1.28
Christian Democrats	Andrew Green	2,502	3.01	−0.01
Independent	Geoff Brown	1,583	1.90	+1.90
Family First	John Phillips	1,032	1.24	+0.09
Australia First	Mick Saunders	976	1.17	+1.17
Total formal votes		83,227	91.83	−2.65
Informal votes		7,402	8.17	+2.65
Turnout		90,629	94.43	−1.45
Two-party-preferred result
Labor	David Bradbury	42,546	51.12	−5.16
Liberal	Fiona Scott	40,681	48.88	+5.16
Labor hold		Swing	−5.16	

=== Lyne ===
2010 Australian federal election: Lyne
Party	Candidate	Votes	%	±%
Independent	Rob Oakeshott	40,061	47.15	+47.15
National	David Gillespie	29,216	34.39	−15.74
Labor	Frederik Lips	11,459	13.49	−18.49
Greens	Ian Oxenford	3,645	4.29	−2.75
Independent	Barry Wright	586	0.69	−0.50
Total formal votes		84,967	96.27	+1.30
Informal votes		3,294	3.73	−1.30
Turnout		88,261	95.35	−0.24
Notional two-party-preferred count
National	David Gillespie	53,065	62.45	+3.65
Labor	Frederik Lips	31,902	37.55	−3.65
Two-candidate-preferred result
Independent	Rob Oakeshott	53,297	62.73	
National	David Gillespie	31,670	37.27	−21.53
Independent gain from National		Swing	N/A	

Mark Vaile (National) had won Lyne at the 2007 election, however he resigned in 2008 and Rob Oakeshott (Independent) won the seat at the resulting by-election.

=== Macarthur ===
2010 Australian federal election: Macarthur
Party	Candidate	Votes	%	±%
Liberal	Russell Matheson	37,069	47.40	+1.79
Labor	Nick Bleasdale	30,151	38.55	−6.86
Greens	Jessica Di Blasio	4,347	5.56	+1.29
One Nation	Kate McCulloch	2,338	2.99	+2.99
Family First	Grant Herbert	1,757	2.25	+0.57
Christian Democrats	Nolene Norsworthy	1,377	1.75	−0.15
Democrats	Clinton Mead	652	0.83	+0.14
Building Australia	Domenic Cammareri	512	0.65	+0.65
Total formal votes		78,203	91.89	−2.54
Informal votes		6,899	8.11	+2.54
Turnout		85,102	94.50	−0.46
Two-party-preferred result
Liberal	Russell Matheson	41,462	53.02	+3.53
Labor	Nick Bleasdale	36,741	46.98	−3.53
Liberal notional gain from Labor		Swing	+3.53	

=== Mackellar ===
2010 Australian federal election: Mackellar
Party	Candidate	Votes	%	±%
Liberal	Bronwyn Bishop	54,110	62.12	+5.74
Labor	Linda Beattie	18,381	21.10	−3.33
Greens	Jonathan King	14,609	16.77	+5.08
Total formal votes		87,100	94.80	−0.53
Informal votes		4,780	5.20	+0.53
Turnout		91,880	93.23	−2.05
Two-party-preferred result
Liberal	Bronwyn Bishop	57,245	65.72	+3.34
Labor	Linda Beattie	29,855	34.28	−3.34
Liberal hold		Swing	+3.34	

=== Macquarie ===
2010 Australian federal election: Macquarie
Party	Candidate	Votes	%	±%
Liberal	Louise Markus	38,867	44.47	−0.23
Labor	Susan Templeman	28,284	32.36	−5.75
Greens	Carmel McCallum	12,317	14.09	+3.11
Liberal Democrats	Peter Whelan	2,087	2.39	+2.19
Christian Democrats	Luke Portelli	1,883	2.15	−0.10
Independent	Amy Bell	1,778	2.03	+2.03
Family First	Jason Cornelius	922	1.05	−0.02
Australia First	John Bates	676	0.77	+0.77
Carers Alliance	Terry Tremethick	591	0.68	+0.68
Total formal votes		87,405	94.52	−1.83
Informal votes		5,067	5.48	+1.83
Turnout		92,472	94.78	−1.13
Two-party-preferred result
Liberal	Louise Markus	44,801	51.26	+1.54
Labor	Susan Templeman	42,604	48.74	−1.54
Liberal gain from Labor		Swing	+1.54	

=== McMahon ===
2010 Australian federal election: McMahon
Party	Candidate	Votes	%	±%
Labor	Chris Bowen	40,933	51.26	−7.41
Liberal	Jamal Elishe	28,950	36.25	+5.29
Greens	Astrid O'Neill	6,428	8.05	+3.37
Christian Democrats	Manny Poularas	3,549	4.44	+1.72
Total formal votes		79,860	89.16	−3.24
Informal votes		9,710	10.84	+3.24
Turnout		89,570	93.25	−0.28
Two-party-preferred result
Labor	Chris Bowen	46,170	57.81	−5.96
Liberal	Jamal Elishe	33,690	42.19	+5.96
Labor notional hold		Swing	−5.96	

=== Mitchell ===
2010 Australian federal election: Mitchell
Party	Candidate	Votes	%	±%
Liberal	Alex Hawke	52,465	62.66	+7.87
Labor	Nigel Gould	22,046	26.33	−6.71
Greens	Colin Dawson	6,363	7.60	+2.32
Christian Democrats	Brendon Prentice	2,855	3.41	+0.82
Total formal votes		83,729	94.42	−1.51
Informal votes		4,952	5.58	+1.51
Turnout		88,681	94.76	−0.21
Two-party-preferred result
Liberal	Alex Hawke	56,229	67.16	+7.51
Labor	Nigel Gould	27,500	32.84	−7.51
Liberal hold		Swing	+7.51	

=== New England ===
2010 Australian federal election: New England
Party	Candidate	Votes	%	±%
Independent	Tony Windsor	56,415	61.88	+5.13
National	Tim Coates	22,991	25.22	−0.32
Labor	Greg Smith	7,414	8.13	−2.77
Greens	Pat Schultz	3,252	3.57	+0.26
One Nation	Brian Dettmann	794	0.87	−0.29
Citizens Electoral Council	Richard Witten	306	0.34	+0.08
Total formal votes		91,172	96.46	−0.57
Informal votes		3,347	3.54	+0.57
Turnout		94,519	94.83	−1.27
Notional two-party-preferred count
National	Tim Coates	60,907	66.8	+1.96
Labor	Greg Smith	30,265	33.2	−1.96
Two-candidate-preferred result
Independent	Tony Windsor	65,203	71.52	−2.89
National	Tim Coates	25,969	28.48	+2.89
Independent hold		Swing	−2.89	

=== Newcastle ===
2010 Australian federal election: Newcastle
Party	Candidate	Votes	%	±%
Labor	Sharon Grierson	39,253	47.89	−2.88
Liberal	Brad Luke	25,680	31.33	+5.77
Greens	Michael Osborne	12,677	15.47	+5.45
Christian Democrats	Milton Caine	1,479	1.80	+0.54
Democrats	Dean Winter	1,419	1.73	+0.68
Socialist Alliance	Zane Alcorn	829	1.01	+0.62
Socialist Equality	Noel Holt	627	0.76	+0.43
Total formal votes		81,964	94.31	−1.26
Informal votes		4,948	5.69	+1.26
Turnout		86,912	93.56	−1.69
Two-party-preferred result
Labor	Sharon Grierson	51,220	62.49	−3.42
Liberal	Brad Luke	30,744	37.51	+3.42
Labor hold		Swing	−3.42	

=== North Sydney ===
2010 Australian federal election: North Sydney
Party	Candidate	Votes	%	±%
Liberal	Joe Hockey	51,179	59.71	+7.94
Labor	Leta Webb	18,961	22.12	−13.15
Greens	Andrew Robjohns	13,314	15.53	+5.97
Democrats	Daniel Pearce	1,275	1.49	+1.45
Family First	Daniel Le	980	1.14	+0.64
Total formal votes		85,709	95.56	−0.72
Informal votes		3,986	4.44	+0.72
Turnout		89,695	91.93	−2.28
Two-party-preferred result
Liberal	Joe Hockey	54,901	64.06	+8.55
Labor	Leta Webb	30,808	35.94	−8.55
Liberal hold		Swing	+8.55	

=== Page ===
2010 Australian federal election: Page
Party	Candidate	Votes	%	±%
Labor	Janelle Saffin	39,043	45.73	+4.05
National	Kevin Hogan	36,263	42.47	−0.58
Greens	Jeff Johnson	7,325	8.58	+0.47
Independent	Doug Behn	1,259	1.47	−0.31
Independent	Merle Summerville	896	1.05	+1.05
Democrats	Julia Melland	598	0.70	−0.36
Total formal votes		85,384	95.61	−0.09
Informal votes		3,918	4.39	+0.09
Turnout		89,302	94.64	−1.45
Two-party-preferred result
Labor	Janelle Saffin	46,273	54.19	+1.83
National	Kevin Hogan	39,111	45.81	−1.83
Labor hold		Swing	+1.83	

=== Parkes ===
2010 Australian federal election: Parkes
Party	Candidate	Votes	%	±%
National	Mark Coulton	53,154	59.23	+11.07
Labor	Andrew Brooks	19,081	21.26	−3.75
Independent	John Clements	9,146	10.19	+10.19
Greens	Matt Parmeter	5,028	5.60	+2.68
Independent	Mick Colless	3,326	3.71	+3.71
Total formal votes		89,735	94.98	−0.94
Informal votes		4,745	5.02	+0.94
Turnout		94,480	94.32	−2.20
Two-party-preferred result
National	Mark Coulton	61,789	68.86	+5.19
Labor	Andrew Brooks	27,946	31.14	−5.19
National hold		Swing	+5.19	

=== Parramatta ===
2010 Australian federal election: Parramatta
Party	Candidate	Votes	%	±%
Labor	Julie Owens	34,818	44.46	−8.94
Liberal	Charles Camenzuli	31,889	40.72	+6.14
Greens	Phil Bradley	6,237	7.96	+2.66
Christian Democrats	Alex Sharah	2,404	3.07	−0.22
Independent	Kalpesh Patel	1,436	1.83	+1.83
Socialist Equality	Chris Gordon	1,203	1.54	+1.38
Socialist Alliance	Duncan Roden	330	0.42	−0.14
Total formal votes		78,317	91.35	−2.03
Informal votes		7,418	8.65	+2.03
Turnout		85,735	91.19	−1.40
Two-party-preferred result
Labor	Julie Owens	42,583	54.37	−5.49
Liberal	Charles Camenzuli	35,734	45.63	+5.49
Labor hold		Swing	−5.49	

=== Paterson ===
2010 Australian federal election: Paterson
Party	Candidate	Votes	%	±%
Liberal	Bob Baldwin	42,262	51.30	+4.73
Labor	Jim Arneman	31,522	38.26	−4.69
Greens	Jan Davis	4,936	5.99	+0.72
One Nation	Kevin Leayr	1,044	1.27	+0.32
Christian Democrats	Anna Balfour	870	1.06	−0.15
Independent	Josef Wiedenhorn	699	0.85	+0.85
Family First	Veronica Lambert	674	0.82	+0.16
	Paul Hennelly	379	0.46	+0.46
Total formal votes		82,386	94.36	−2.04
Informal votes		4,924	5.64	+2.04
Turnout		87,310	94.75	−0.98
Two-party-preferred result
Liberal	Bob Baldwin	45,582	55.33	+4.75
Labor	Jim Arneman	36,804	44.67	−4.75
Liberal hold		Swing	+4.75	

=== Reid ===
2010 Australian federal election: Reid
Party	Candidate	Votes	%	±%
Liberal	Peter Cooper	34,328	43.11	+7.42
Labor	John Murphy	33,051	41.51	−11.35
Greens	Adam Butler	8,903	11.18	+3.27
Christian Democrats	Bill Shailer	2,445	3.07	+0.76
Socialist Equality	Carolyn Kennett	901	1.13	+1.13
Total formal votes		79,628	91.20	−3.22
Informal votes		7,680	8.80	+3.22
Turnout		87,308	91.07	−2.07
Two-party-preferred result
Labor	John Murphy	41,949	52.68	−8.16
Liberal	Peter Cooper	37,679	47.32	+8.16
Labor hold		Swing	−8.16	

=== Richmond ===
2010 Australian federal election: Richmond
Party	Candidate	Votes	%	±%
Labor	Justine Elliot	31,679	39.19	−4.62
National	Alan Hunter	17,146	21.21	−15.77
Liberal	Joan van Lieshout	15,424	19.08	+19.08
Greens	Joe Ebono	13,056	16.15	+1.22
Independent	Julie Boyd	940	1.16	+1.16
Independent	Matthew Hartley	805	1.00	+1.00
Independent	Stephen Hegedus	747	0.92	+0.92
Independent	Nic Faulkner	536	0.66	+0.66
Democrats	David Robinson	502	0.62	+0.62
Total formal votes		80,835	94.45	−1.27
Informal votes		4,752	5.55	+1.27
Turnout		85,587	92.64	−1.85
Two-party-preferred result
Labor	Justine Elliot	46,071	56.99	−1.88
National	Alan Hunter	34,764	43.01	+1.88
Labor hold		Swing	−1.88	

=== Riverina ===
2010 Australian federal election: Riverina
Party	Candidate	Votes	%	±%
National	Michael McCormack	39,389	44.77	−11.60
Labor	Robyn Hakelis	19,559	22.23	−8.30
Liberal	Andrew Negline	14,536	16.52	+12.10
Independent	Matthew Hogg	5,148	5.85	+5.85
Greens	David Fletcher	3,961	4.50	−0.27
Liberal Democrats	Tim Quilty	1,703	1.94	+1.84
One Nation	Craig Hesketh	1,411	1.60	−0.34
Christian Democrats	Sylvia Mulholland	1,201	1.36	+1.21
Family First	Rhonda Lever	1,081	1.23	+1.11
Total formal votes		87,989	94.24	−1.87
Informal votes		5,378	5.76	+1.87
Turnout		93,367	94.70	−1.05
Two-party-preferred result
National	Michael McCormack	59,980	68.17	+3.62
Labor	Robyn Hakelis	28,009	31.83	−3.62
National hold		Swing	+3.62	

=== Robertson ===
2010 Australian federal election: Robertson
Party	Candidate	Votes	%	±%
Liberal	Darren Jameson	37,151	43.53	−2.11
Labor	Deborah O'Neill	33,935	39.76	−3.15
Greens	Peter Freewater	7,671	8.99	+1.79
Christian Democrats	Graham Freemantle	1,544	1.81	−0.40
Independent	Melissa Batten	1,513	1.77	+1.77
Independent	Jake Cassar	1,077	1.26	+1.26
Family First	Michael Jakob	749	0.88	+0.07
Liberal Democrats	Nicole Beiger	581	0.68	+0.68
One Nation	Don Parkes	568	0.67	−0.39
Independent	Michelle Meares	552	0.65	+0.65
Total formal votes		85,341	93.64	−2.92
Informal votes		5,795	6.36	+2.92
Turnout		91,136	94.35	−1.76
Two-party-preferred result
Labor	Deborah O'Neill	43,520	51.00	+0.91
Liberal	Darren Jameson	41,821	49.00	−0.91
Labor hold		Swing	+0.91	

=== Shortland ===
2010 Australian federal election: Shortland
Party	Candidate	Votes	%	±%
Labor	Jill Hall	44,987	53.74	−2.99
Liberal	Deborah Narayanan	27,758	33.16	+2.04
Greens	Phillipa Parsons	8,646	10.33	+2.03
One Nation	Milton Alchin	1,726	2.06	+2.06
Secular	Peter Williams	596	0.71	+0.71
Total formal votes		83,713	93.66	−2.18
Informal votes		5,671	6.34	+2.18
Turnout		89,384	94.84	−1.44
Two-party-preferred result
Labor	Jill Hall	52,612	62.85	−1.89
Liberal	Deborah Narayanan	31,101	37.15	+1.89
Labor hold		Swing	−1.89	

=== Sydney ===
2010 Australian federal election: Sydney
Party	Candidate	Votes	%	±%
Labor	Tanya Plibersek	34,362	43.29	−5.92
Liberal	Gordon Weiss	22,307	28.10	+1.20
Greens	Tony Hickey	18,852	23.75	+3.44
Democrats	Brett Paterson	1,256	1.58	+0.48
Independent	Jane Ward	1,226	1.54	+0.30
Secular	Christopher Owen	718	0.90	+0.90
Communist Alliance	Denis Doherty	656	0.83	+0.83
Total formal votes		79,377	94.50	−1.32
Informal votes		4,620	5.50	+1.32
Turnout		83,997	88.16	−3.65
Two-party-preferred result
Labor	Tanya Plibersek	53,235	67.07	−2.25
Liberal	Gordon Weiss	26,142	32.93	+2.25
Labor hold		Swing	−2.25	

=== Throsby ===
2010 Australian federal election: Throsby
Party	Candidate	Votes	%	±%
Labor	Stephen Jones	42,227	50.53	−7.69
Liberal	Juliet Arkwright	25,330	30.31	+1.35
Greens	Peter Moran	9,973	11.93	+2.99
National	Alan Hay	4,446	5.32	+5.32
Non-Custodial Parents	Wayne Hartman	1,595	1.91	+1.91
Total formal votes		83,571	93.10	−2.03
Informal votes		6,197	6.90	+2.03
Turnout		89,768	93.63	−2.23
Two-party-preferred result
Labor	Stephen Jones	51,909	62.11	−4.65
Liberal	Juliet Arkwright	31,662	37.89	+4.65
Labor hold		Swing	−4.65	

=== Warringah ===
2010 Australian federal election: Warringah
Party	Candidate	Votes	%	±%
Liberal	Tony Abbott	50,063	58.92	+4.91
Labor	Hugh Zochling	18,385	21.64	−6.85
Greens	Matthew Drake-Brockman	13,883	16.34	+4.03
Sex Party	Alexander Gutman	2,075	2.44	+2.44
Secular	Kenneth Cooke	566	0.67	+0.67
Total formal votes		84,972	95.36	−1.20
Informal votes		4,135	4.64	+1.20
Turnout		89,107	92.14	−2.69
Two-party-preferred result
Liberal	Tony Abbott	53,612	63.09	+4.31
Labor	Hugh Zochling	31,360	36.91	−4.31
Liberal hold		Swing	+4.31	

=== Watson ===
2010 Australian federal election: Watson
Party	Candidate	Votes	%	±%
Labor	Tony Burke	38,707	50.43	−9.87
Liberal	Ken Nam	28,527	37.17	+9.53
Greens	Christine Donayre	7,387	9.62	+3.14
Independent	Mark Sharma	2,136	2.78	+2.78
Total formal votes		76,757	87.20	−3.71
Informal votes		11,265	12.80	+3.71
Turnout		88,022	90.03	−2.21
Two-party-preferred result
Labor	Tony Burke	45,393	59.14	−9.06
Liberal	Ken Nam	31,364	40.86	+9.06
Labor hold		Swing	−9.06	

=== Wentworth ===
2010 Australian federal election: Wentworth
Party	Candidate	Votes	%	±%
Liberal	Malcolm Turnbull	51,634	59.57	+9.20
Labor	Steven Lewis	18,265	21.07	−9.41
Greens	Matthew Robertson	15,114	17.44	+2.48
Independent	Pat Sheil	515	0.59	+0.29
Independent	Malcolm Duncan	484	0.56	+0.56
Carers Alliance	Stuart Neal	389	0.45	+0.45
Secular	John August	275	0.32	+0.32
Total formal votes		86,676	95.50	+0.40
Informal votes		4,085	4.50	−0.40
Turnout		90,761	89.45	−3.08
Two-party-preferred result
Liberal	Malcolm Turnbull	56,219	64.86	+11.01
Labor	Steven Lewis	30,457	35.14	−11.01
Liberal hold		Swing	+11.01	

=== Werriwa ===
2010 Australian federal election: Werriwa
Party	Candidate	Votes	%	±%
Labor	Laurie Ferguson	36,582	48.57	−10.13
Liberal	Sam Eskaros	29,165	38.72	+8.33
Greens	Lauren Moore	9,567	12.70	+8.87
Total formal votes		75,314	89.65	−3.77
Informal votes		8,692	10.35	+3.77
Turnout		84,006	92.32	−1.58
Two-party-preferred result
Labor	Laurie Ferguson	42,740	56.75	−8.32
Liberal	Sam Eskaros	32,574	43.25	+8.32
Labor hold		Swing	−8.32	

== See also ==
- 2010 Australian federal election
- Results of the 2010 Australian federal election (House of Representatives)
- Post-election pendulum for the 2010 Australian federal election
- Members of the Australian House of Representatives, 2010–2013
