= Opinion polling for the 2010 Australian federal election =

This article provides a list of federal opinion polls that were conducted between the 2007 election and 2010 election.

== JWS poll of 28,000 ==
A JWS Research "mega-poll", published by Fairfax, polled an Australian record 22,000 voters in 54 marginal seats and a further 6,000 in safe seats late in the campaign. It revealed a national two-party preferred vote for Labor of 51.6 percent. Losses in Queensland and New South Wales were offset by the gains of Dunkley, McEwen (both 57 percent), and Cowper and Boothby (both 54 percent), with a total of 79 Labor, 68 coalition, 3 independent.

== Newspoll ==
Newspoll federal polling, published in The Australian, consists of voting intention, better prime minister and leader satisfaction-dissatisfaction ratings, and is conducted via random telephone number selection in city and country areas nationwide, Friday to Sunday, usually each fortnight. Sampling sizes consist of around 1100–1200 electors. The declared margin of error is ± 3 percentage points.

== Voting intention ==
(<) – since July 2010, Newspoll has not provided a separate Liberal and National primary vote, therefore from 23–25 July 2010 the Liberal column displays the coalition primary vote.

House of Representatives opinion polling
Date	Political parties					Two-party-preferred
	ALP	Lib	Nat	Grn	Oth	ALP	Lib/Nat
Election	38%	43.4%	<	11.8%	4.1%	50.1%	49.9%
17–19 Aug 2010	36.2%	43.4%	<	13.9%	6.5%	50.2%	49.8%
13–15 Aug 2010	38%	41%	<	14%	7%	52%	48%
6–8 Aug 2010	38%	42%	<	13%	7%	52%	48%
30 Jul – 1 Aug 2010	37%	44%	<	12%	7%	50%	50%
23–25 Jul 2010	40%	42%	<	12%	6%	52%	48%
16–18 Jul 2010	42%	34%	4%	12%	8%	55%	45%
25–27 Jun 2010	42%	37%	3%	10%	8%	53%	47%
24 June 2010	Julia Gillard is elected Prime Minister in Labor leadership spill
18–20 Jun 2010	35%	36%	4%	15%	10%	52%	48%
28–30 May 2010	35%	38%	3%	16%	8%	51%	49%
14–16 May 2010	37%	40%	3%	12%	8%	50%	50%
30 Apr-2 May 2010	35%	38%	5%	10%	12%	49%	51%
16–18 Apr 2010	43%	37%	3%	10%	7%	54%	46%
26–28 Mar 2010	43%	35%	3%	12%	7%	56%	44%
12–14 Mar 2010	39%	37%	4%	11%	9%	52%	48%
26–28 Feb 2010	40%	37%	4%	9%	10%	52%	48%
12–14 Feb 2010	39%	36%	4%	12%	9%	53%	47%
29–31 Jan 2010	40%	37%	4%	12%	7%	52%	48%
15–17 Jan 2010	40%	34%	4%	12%	10%	54%	46%
4–6 Dec 2009	43%	34%	4%	11%	8%	56%	44%
1 Dec 2009	Tony Abbott is elected Opposition in a Liberal Party leadership spill
27–29 Nov 2009	43%	30%	5%	12%	10%	57%	43%
13–15 Nov 2009	43%	33%	4%	11%	9%	56%	44%
30 Oct – 1 Nov 2009	41%	36%	5%	10%	8%	52%	48%
16–18 Oct 2009	48%	30%	4%	10%	8%	59%	41%
2 – 4 Oct 2009	46%	31%	4%	10%	9%	58%	42%
18–20 Sep 2009	43%	33%	5%	11%	8%	55%	45%
4–6 Sep 2009	44%	35%	4%	10%	7%	55%	45%
21–23 Aug 2009	44%	34%	4%	9%	9%	55%	45%
7–9 Aug 2009	45%	33%	4%	10%	8%	57%	43%
24–26 Jul 2009	46%	34%	4%	9%	7%	57%	43%
10–12 Jul 2009	43%	34%	5%	11%	7%	55%	45%
26–28 Jun 2009	44%	32%	5%	10%	9%	56%	44%
12–14 Jun 2009	41%	36%	4%	11%	8%	53%	47%
29–31 May 2009	43%	35%	3%	10%	9%	55%	45%
15–17 May 2009	46%	34%	3%	9%	8%	56%	44%
1–3 May 2009	42%	35%	3%	11%	9%	55%	45%
17–19 Apr 2009	47%	33%	4%	9%	7%	58%	42%
3–5 Apr 2009	47%	32%	4%	9%	8%	58%	42%
20–22 Mar 2009	45%	32%	5%	8%	10%	56%	44%
7–9 Mar 2009	44%	32%	4%	10%	10%	56%	44%
20–22 Feb 2009	47%	33%	3%	9%	8%	58%	42%
6–8 Feb 2009	48%	32%	4%	8%	8%	58%	42%
16–18 Jan 2009	43%	35%	4%	10%	8%	54%	46%
5–7 Dec 2008	48%	32%	3%	10%	7%	59%	41%
21–23 Nov 2008	42%	33%	5%	11%	9%	55%	45%
7–9 Nov 2008	44%	35%	3%	9%	9%	55%	45%
24–26 Oct 2008	44%	36%	3%	9%	8%	54%	46%
10–12 Oct 2008	41%	34%	4%	13%	8%	55%	45%
19–21 Sep 2008	42%	34%	4%	10%	10%	55%	45%
16 Sep 2008	Malcolm Turnbull is elected Opposition in a Liberal Party leadership spill
5–7 Sep 2008	44%	34%	3%	11%	8%	56%	44%
22–24 Aug 2008	45%	34%	4%	8%	9%	56%	44%
8–10 Aug 2008	47%	33%	5%	9%	6%	57%	43%
25–27 Jul 2008	47%	33%	4%	10%	6%	57%	43%
11–13 Jul 2008	43%	33%	5%	11%	8%	55%	45%
27–29 Jun 2008	44%	34%	5%	10%	7%	55%	45%
13–15 Jun 2008	46%	29%	4%	12%	9%	59%	41%
30 May – 1 Jun 2008	46%	33%	4%	10%	7%	57%	43%
16–18 May 2008	47%	34%	3%	9%	7%	57%	43%
2–4 May 2008	47%	33%	4%	9%	7%	57%	43%
18–20 Apr 2008	51%	30%	4%	9%	6%	61%	39%
4–6 Apr 2008	48%	32%	3%	10%	7%	59%	41%
14–16 Mar 2008	47%	31%	4%	11%	7%	59%	41%
29 Feb – 2 Mar 2008	51%	28%	3%	10%	8%	63%	37%
15–17 Feb 2008	46%	33%	3%	10%	8%	57%	43%
18–20 Jan 2008	46%	32%	3%	12%	7%	58%	42%
2007 election	43.4%	36.6%	5.5%	7.8%	6.7%	52.7%	47.3%
20–22 Nov 2007	44%	39%	4%	7%	6%	52%	48%
Polling conducted by Newspoll and published in The Australian.

=== Leader ratings ===
Better Prime Minister^
Date	Labor Gillard	Liberal Abbott
17–19 Aug 2010	50%	37%
13–15 Aug 2010	50%	35%
6–8 Aug 2010	49%	34%
30 Jul – 1 Aug 2010	50%	35%
23–25 Jul 2010	50%	34%
16–18 Jul 2010	57%	27%
25–27 Jun 2010	53%	29%
	Rudd	Abbott
18–20 Jun 2010	46%	37%
28–30 May 2010	49%	33%
14–16 May 2010	49%	33%
30 Apr – 2 May 2010	50%	32%
16–18 Apr 2010	56%	29%
26–28 Mar 2010	59%	27%
12–14 Mar 2010	55%	30%
26–28 Feb 2010	55%	30%
12–14 Feb 2010	55%	27%
29–31 Jan 2010	58%	26%
15–17 Jan 2010	57%	25%
4–6 Dec 2009	60%	23%
	Rudd	Turnbull
27–29 Nov 2009	65%	14%
13–15 Nov 2009	63%	22%
30 Oct-1 Nov 2009	63%	19%
16–18 Oct 2009	65%	19%
2-4 Oct 2009	67%	18%
18–20 Sep 2009	65%	17%
4–6 Sep 2009	67%	19%
21–23 Aug 2009	66%	19%
7–9 Aug 2009	65%	17%
24–26 Jul 2009	66%	16%
10–12 Jul 2009	64%	19%
26–28 Jun 2009	65%	18%
12–14 Jun 2009	57%	25%
29–31 May 2009	57%	24%
15–17 May 2009	58%	24%
1–3 May 2009	64%	19%
17–19 Apr 2009	67%	19%
3–5 Apr 2009	67%	18%
20–22 Mar 2009	65%	20%
7–9 Mar 2009	61%	21%
20–22 Feb 2009	64%	20%
6–8 Feb 2009	62%	20%
16–18 Jan 2009	60%	22%
5–7 Dec 2008	66%	19%
21–23 Nov 2008	63%	21%
7–9 Nov 2008	62%	22%
24–26 Oct 2008	59%	25%
10–12 Oct 2008	54%	26%
19–21 Sep 2008	54%	24%
	Rudd	Nelson
5–7 Sep 2008	62%	16%
22–24 Aug 2008	65%	14%
8–10 Aug 2008	68%	12%
25–27 Jul 2008	66%	14%
11–13 Jul 2008	65%	14%
27–29 Jun 2008	64%	15%
13–15 Jun 2008	68%	13%
30 May – 1 Jun 2008	66%	17%
16–18 May 2008	70%	12%
2–4 May 2008	72%	9%
18–20 Apr 2008	71%	10%
4–6 Apr 2008	73%	9%
14–16 Mar 2008	70%	10%
29 Feb – 2 Mar 2008	73%	7%
15–17 Feb 2008	70%	9%
18–20 Jan 2008	68%	11%
30 Nov – 2 Dec 2007	61%	14%
	Rudd	Howard
20–22 Nov 2007	47%	44%
Polling conducted by Newspoll and published in The Australian.^Remainder were "uncommitted".

Satisfaction^
	Gillard		Abbott
Date	Satisfied	Dissatisfied	Satisfied	Dissatisfied
17–19 Aug 2010	44%	43%	42%	50%
13–15 Aug 2010	44%	38%	43%	46%
6–8 Aug 2010	43%	41%	41%	49%
30 Jul – 1 Aug 2010	42%	40%	44%	46%
23–25 Jul 2010	41%	37%	40%	46%
16–18 Jul 2010	48%	29%	36%	51%
25–27 Jun 2010	N/A (new)	N/A (new)	42%	41%
	Rudd		Abbott
18–20 Jun 2010	36%	55%	38%	49%
28–30 May 2010	36%	54%	37%	49%
14–16 May 2010	39%	51%	42%	45%
30 Apr – 2 May 2010	39%	50%	45%	43%
16–18 Apr 2010	50%	41%	46%	40%
26–28 Mar 2010	51%	39%	44%	43%
12–14 Mar 2010	48%	41%	47%	38%
26–28 Feb 2010	51%	40%	48%	38%
12–14 Feb 2010	50%	40%	44%	37%
29–31 Jan 2010	50%	38%	41%	39%
15–17 Jan 2010	52%	34%	40%	35%
4–6 Dec 2009	58%	32%	N/A (new)	N/A (new)
	Rudd		Turnbull
27–29 Nov 2009	56%	34%	36%	50%
13–15 Nov 2009	56%	34%	34%	50%
30 Oct – 1 Nov 2009	59%	32%	32%	51%
16–18 Oct 2009	63%	28%	32%	54%
28 Sep – 1 Oct 2009	67%	21%	33%	48%
Polling conducted by Newspoll and published in The Australian.^Remainder were "uncommitted".

== Roy Morgan ==
The Roy Morgan poll consisted of two different sampling. There was a face to face interview and a phone interview to sample voting intention, which was conducted via random telephone number selection in city and country areas nationwide.

House of Representatives - face to face interview
	Political parties					Two-party-preferred
	ALP	Lib	Nat	Grn	Oth	ALP	Lib/Nat
7–8 Aug 2010	43%	33.5%	3.5%	15.5%	2%	57.5%	42.5%
31 July – 1 Aug 2010	44%	39%	2%	10%	4%	53%	47%
24–25 July 2010	43.5%	35%	2%	11.5%	6.5%	55.5%	44.5%
17–18 July 2010	44.5%	35%	4.5%	10.5%	4%	56%	44%
Polling conducted by Roy Morgan.

== See also ==
- 2010 Australian federal election
- 2007 Australian federal election
