= Electoral results for the Division of Wright =

Australian division election results

This is a list of electoral results for the Division of Wright in Australian federal elections from the division's creation in 2009 until the present.

== Members ==
| Member | Party | Term |
|---|---|---|
| Scott Buchholz | Liberal National | 2010–present |

== Election results ==
=== Elections in the 2020s ===
==== 2025 ====
2025 Australian federal election: Wright
| Party | Candidate | Votes | % | ±% |
|---|---|---|---|---|
| One Nation | Natalie Davis | | | |
| Greens | Nicole Thompson | | | |
| Family First | Julie Rose | | | |
| Trumpet of Patriots | Scott Thompson | | | |
| Liberal National | Scott Buchholz | | | |
| Labor | Pam McCreadie | | | |
| Animal Justice | Chloe Leeanne Snyman | | | |
| People First | Justin McGuiness | | | |
| Total formal votes | | | | |
| Informal votes | | | | |
| Turnout | | | | |

==== 2022 ====
2022 Australian federal election: Wright
| Party | Candidate | Votes | % | ±% |
|---|---|---|---|---|
| Liberal National | Scott Buchholz | 45,753 | 43.19 | −1.73 |
| Labor | Pam McCreadie | 22,643 | 21.37 | +2.63 |
| One Nation | Keith Hicks | 15,095 | 14.25 | +0.24 |
| Greens | Nicole Thompson | 12,107 | 11.43 | +4.26 |
| United Australia | Cassandra Duffill | 8,703 | 8.22 | +3.32 |
| Federation | Shonna-Lee Banasiak | 1,632 | 1.54 | +1.54 |
| Total formal votes | | 105,933 | 96.60 | +2.68 |
| Informal votes | | 3,733 | 3.40 | −2.68 |
| Turnout | | 109,666 | 88.59 | −3.42 |
Two-party-preferred result
| Liberal National | Scott Buchholz | 64,506 | 60.89 | −3.69 |
| Labor | Pam McCreadie | 41,427 | 39.11 | +3.69 |
| Liberal National hold | | Swing | −3.69 | |

Alluvial diagram for preference flows in the seat of Wright in the 2022 federal election. indicates at what stage the winning candidate had over 50% of the votes and was declared the winner.

=== Elections in the 2010s ===
==== 2019 ====
2019 Australian federal election: Wright
| Party | Candidate | Votes | % | ±% |
|---|---|---|---|---|
| Liberal National | Scott Buchholz | 43,522 | 44.92 | +3.10 |
| Labor | Pam McCreadie | 18,155 | 18.74 | −4.03 |
| One Nation | Chris O'Callaghan | 13,576 | 14.01 | −6.89 |
| Greens | Shannon Girard | 6,951 | 7.17 | −0.49 |
| Independent | Innes Larkin | 5,165 | 5.33 | +5.33 |
| United Australia | David Wright | 4,747 | 4.90 | +4.90 |
| Katter's Australian | Matthew Tomlinson | 2,613 | 2.70 | +2.70 |
| Conservative National | Rod Smith | 2,164 | 2.23 | +2.23 |
| Total formal votes | | 96,893 | 93.92 | −1.77 |
| Informal votes | | 6,269 | 6.08 | +1.77 |
| Turnout | | 103,162 | 92.01 | −0.23 |
Two-party-preferred result
| Liberal National | Scott Buchholz | 62,571 | 64.58 | +4.96 |
| Labor | Pam McCreadie | 34,322 | 35.42 | −4.96 |
| Liberal National hold | | Swing | +4.96 | |

==== 2016 ====
2016 Australian federal election: Wright
| Party | Candidate | Votes | % | ±% |
|---|---|---|---|---|
| Liberal National | Scott Buchholz | 36,935 | 41.82 | −6.02 |
| Labor | Allistair Smith | 20,110 | 22.77 | +1.38 |
| One Nation | Rod Smith | 18,461 | 20.90 | +20.90 |
| Greens | Pietro Agnoletto | 6,768 | 7.66 | +2.26 |
| Family First | Barry Austin | 3,163 | 3.58 | +1.00 |
| Liberal Democrats | Mark Stone | 1,979 | 2.24 | +2.24 |
| Mature Australia | John Cox | 902 | 1.02 | +1.02 |
| Total formal votes | | 88,318 | 95.69 | +0.72 |
| Informal votes | | 3,980 | 4.31 | −0.72 |
| Turnout | | 92,298 | 92.33 | −1.74 |
Two-party-preferred result
| Liberal National | Scott Buchholz | 52,651 | 59.62 | −2.22 |
| Labor | Allistair Smith | 35,667 | 40.38 | +2.22 |
| Liberal National hold | | Swing | −2.22 | |

==== 2013 ====
2013 Australian federal election: Wright
| Party | Candidate | Votes | % | ±% |
|---|---|---|---|---|
| Liberal National | Scott Buchholz | 38,630 | 47.84 | −5.25 |
| Labor | Sharon Murakami | 17,267 | 21.39 | −6.39 |
| Palmer United | Angie Ison | 11,691 | 14.48 | +14.48 |
| Greens | Judith Summers | 4,358 | 5.40 | −6.55 |
| Katter's Australian | David Neuendorf | 4,332 | 5.37 | +5.37 |
| Family First | Stephen Lynch | 2,087 | 2.58 | −1.30 |
| Independent | Matthew Wright | 1,810 | 2.24 | +2.24 |
| Rise Up Australia | Tony Maunder | 565 | 0.70 | +0.70 |
| Total formal votes | | 80,740 | 94.97 | +0.60 |
| Informal votes | | 4,276 | 5.03 | −0.60 |
| Turnout | | 85,016 | 94.13 | +0.45 |
Two-party-preferred result
| Liberal National | Scott Buchholz | 49,930 | 61.84 | +1.69 |
| Labor | Sharon Murakami | 30,810 | 38.16 | −1.69 |
| Liberal National hold | | Swing | +1.69 | |

==== 2010 ====
2010 Australian federal election: Wright
| Party | Candidate | Votes | % | ±% |
|---|---|---|---|---|
| Liberal National | Scott Buchholz | 40,031 | 53.09 | +1.47 |
| Labor | Andrew Ramsay | 20,946 | 27.78 | −10.74 |
| Greens | Anna Bridle | 9,010 | 11.95 | +6.99 |
| Family First | Jeremy Fredericks | 2,923 | 3.88 | +1.78 |
| Independent | Ken Degen | 2,497 | 3.31 | +3.31 |
| Total formal votes | | 75,407 | 94.37 | −1.85 |
| Informal votes | | 4,497 | 5.63 | +1.85 |
| Turnout | | 79,904 | 93.67 | +0.09 |
Two-party-preferred result
| Liberal National | Scott Buchholz | 45,358 | 60.15 | +6.36 |
| Labor | Andrew Ramsay | 30,049 | 39.85 | −6.36 |
| Liberal National notional hold | | Swing | +6.36 | |
