= Communist Alliance =

Australian political party

The Communist Alliance was registered on 16 March 2009 with the Australian Electoral Commission (AEC) as an Australian political party. It was an alliance of a number of Communist groups, individuals and ethnic-based communist parties. The Alliance was formed to allow communists to run in elections under the Communist banner, while allowing the Communist Party of Australia, a member of the Alliance, to retain a separate, independent membership.

The Alliance endorsed a candidate for the House of Representatives seat of Sydney in the 2010 federal election. The candidate received 0.83% or 656 of the 79,377 votes cast. It also endorsed two candidates for the Senate in New South Wales, receiving 0.17% or 6,999 of the 4,333,267 votes cast.

Communist Alliance changed its AEC registered name to "The Communists" on 24 August 2011, but the AEC deregistered The Communists as a political party on 22 May 2012 because it "failed to prove it still had 500 members eligible for enrolment."
