= 2010 Australian federal election =

Election for the 43rd Parliament of Australia

- 21 August 2010

All 150 seats in the House of Representatives 76 seats were needed for a majority in the House 40 (of the 76) seats in the Senate
- Opinion polls
- Registered: 14,086,869 ▲3.23%
- Turnout: 13,131,667 (93.22%) (▼1.50 pp)
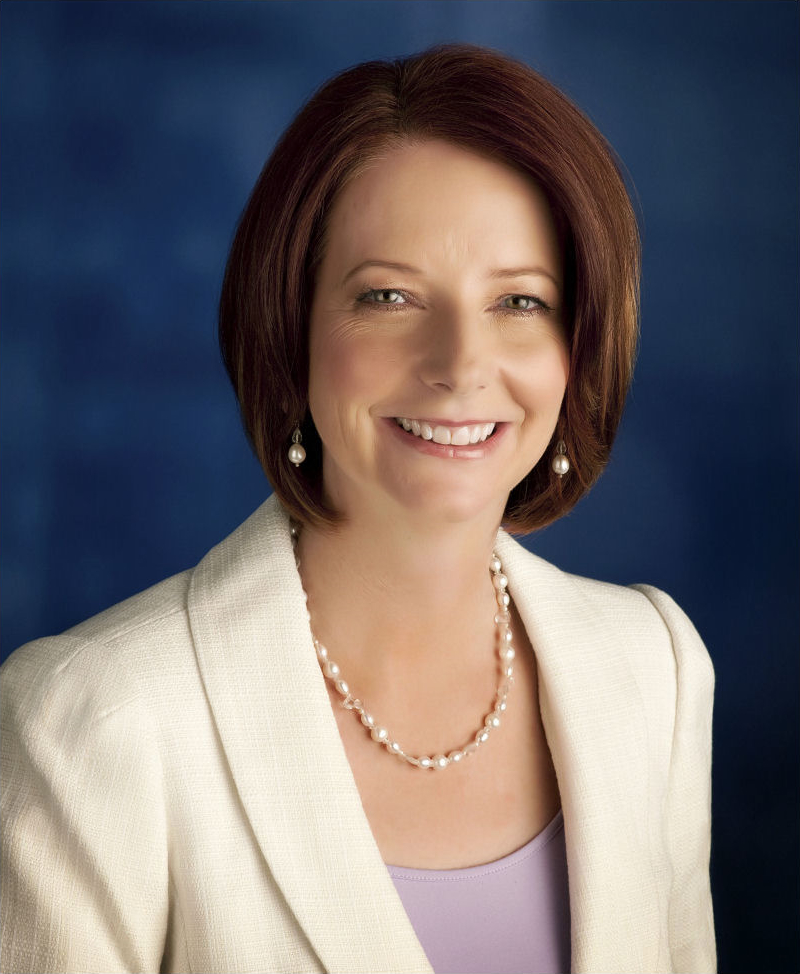

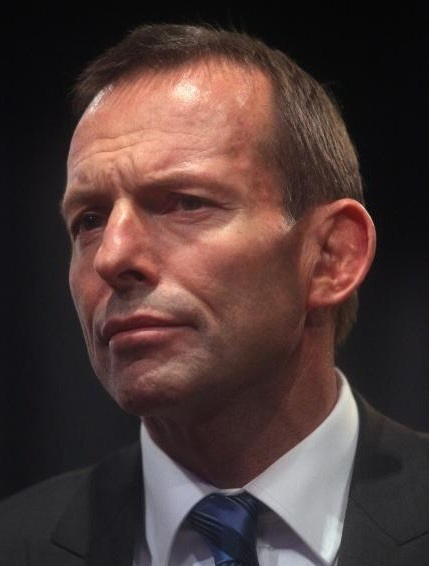

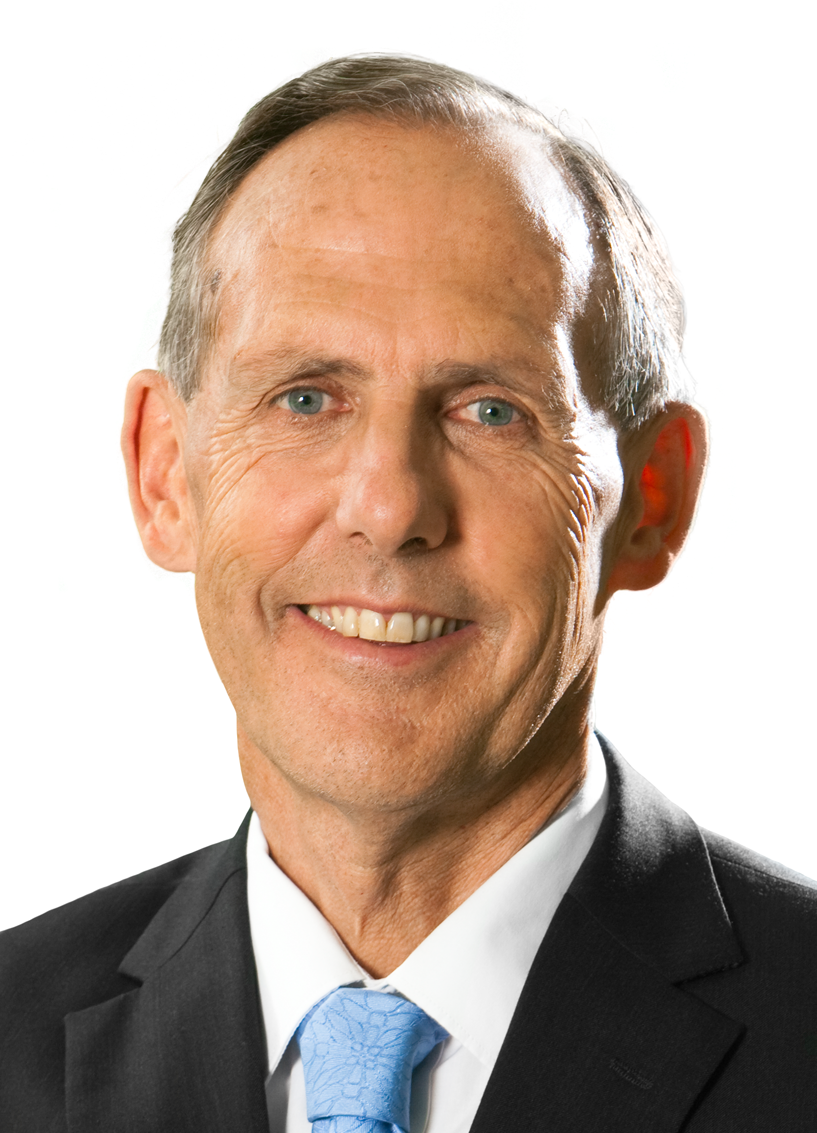

	First party	Second party	Third party
Leader	Julia Gillard	Tony Abbott	Bob Brown
Party	Labor	Coalition	Greens
Leader since	24 June 2010	1 December 2009	28 November 2005
Leader's seat	Lalor (Vic.)	Warringah (NSW)	Tasmania (Senate)
Last election	83 seats, 43.38%	65 seats, 41.95%	0 seats, 7.79%
Seats won	72	72	1
Seat change	▼11	▲7	▲1
Primary vote	4,711,363	5,365,529	1,458,998
Percentage	37.99%	43.32%	11.76%
Swing	▼5.40	▲1.16	▲3.97
TPP	50.12%	49.88%
TPP swing	▼2.58	▲2.58
	Fourth party	Fifth party
		IND
Party	WA Nationals (Note: The National Party of Western Australia, prior to and subsequent to the election, was not in the federal Coalition agreement. WA Nationals MP Tony Crook stated that he was a crossbencher, and has said: "In every news report and press report we see, my number is being allocated in with the Coalition and it shouldn't be". Thus, the party has been counted separately from the Coalition totals.)	Independents
Last election	0 seats	2 seats
Seats won	1	4
Seat change	▲1	▲2
Primary vote	43,101	312,496
Percentage	0.34%	2.52%
Swing	▲0.20	▲0.30
Prime Minister before election
Julia Gillard
Labor
Subsequent Prime Minister
Julia Gillard
Labor

A federal election was held on 21 August 2010 to elect members of the 43rd Parliament of Australia. All 150 seats in the House of Representatives were up for election, along with 40 of the 76 seats in the Senate. The incumbent Labor government, led by Prime Minister Julia Gillard, was re-elected to a second term, defeating the opposition Liberal–National Coalition, led by Tony Abbott. The Labor Party won 72 seats, forming a minority government with the support of three independent MPs and one Greens MP.

Labor and the Coalition each won 72 seats in the 150-seat House of Representatives, four short of the requirement for majority government, resulting in the first hung parliament since the 1940 election. Six crossbenchers held the balance of power. Greens MP Adam Bandt and independent MPs Andrew Wilkie, Rob Oakeshott and Tony Windsor declared their support for Labor on confidence and supply. Independent MP Bob Katter and National Party of Western Australia MP Tony Crook declared their support for the Coalition on confidence and supply. The resulting 76–74 margin entitled Labor to form a minority government. The Prime Minister, government ministers and parliamentary secretaries were sworn in on 14 September 2010 by the Governor-General Quentin Bryce. In November 2011, Coalition MP and Deputy Speaker Peter Slipper replaced Labor MP Harry Jenkins as Speaker of the House of Representatives, increasing Labor's parliamentary majority from 75–74 (not including Jenkins as he was unable to vote on legislation due to his role as Speaker) to 76–73 (not including Slipper, for the same reason).

In the 76-seat Senate, the Greens won one seat in each of the six states, gaining the sole balance of power with a total of nine seats, after previously holding a shared balance of power with the Family First Party and independent Nick Xenophon. The Coalition was reduced from 37 to 34 and Labor was reduced from 32 to 31. The two remaining seats were occupied by Xenophon and Victoria's new Democratic Labor Party Senator John Madigan. Family First Party Senator Steve Fielding was defeated. These changes took effect in the Senate on 1 July 2011.

More than 13 million Australians were enrolled to vote at the time of the election. Australia has compulsory voting (since 1925) and uses preferential ballot (since 1919) in single-member seats for the House of Representatives and single transferable vote (since 1949) for the Senate. At the time Australia used optional group voting tickets (since 1984) in the proportionally represented Senate but since the 2016 election has abolished group voting tickets. The election was conducted by the Australian Electoral Commission (AEC).

Prior to the Labor party's win in the 2022 Australian federal election, this was the most recent federal contest in which Labor formed government. It remains the most recent election in which the leader of the party forming government represented a division outside New South Wales.

== Background ==
=== Key dates ===
- Announcement of election: Saturday 17 July
- Prorogation of 42nd Parliament: 4.59 p.m., Monday 19 July AEST
- Dissolution of House of Representatives: 5 p.m., Monday 19 July AEST
- Issue of electoral writs: Monday 19 July
- Close of rolls (if not currently on roll): 8 p.m., Monday 19 July AEST (Note: On 6 August 2010, the High Court of Australia ruled in the case Rowe v Electoral Commissioner that certain provisions of the Commonwealth Electoral Act 1918 were invalid, specifically those introduced in the Electoral and Referendum Amendment (Electoral Integrity and Other Measures) Act 2006, which closed the electoral roll on the day the writ for a federal election is issued. An estimated 100,000 enrolments were reconsidered by the Australian Electoral Commission, which contacted applicants to inform them they would be eligible to vote in this election.)
- Close of rolls (if currently on roll and updating details): 8 p.m., Thursday 22 July AEST
- Close of nominations: 12 noon, Thursday 29 July AEST
- Declaration of nominations: 12 noon, Friday 30 July AEST
- Polling day: Saturday 21 August
- Return of writs (latest date): Wednesday 27 October

=== House of Representatives ===
The Labor Party, led by Julia Gillard, and the Liberal Party, led by Tony Abbott, were the predominant parties to contest the election. The smaller National Party led by Warren Truss is in a coalition with the Liberal Party. Following the 2007 federal election, the 150-member Australian House of Representatives consisted of 83 Labor-held seats, 65 Coalition seats (55 Liberal and 10 National), and two seats held by independents. The Australian Greens won 8 per cent of the 2007 vote, and the Family First Party won 2 per cent, with the Greens winning 1 seat in the lower house.

The coalition total was reduced to 64 seats when Rob Oakeshott, former state Nationals-turned-independent MP, won the seat of Lyne at the September 2008 Lyne by-election, resulting from the resignation of former Howard minister and Nationals leader Mark Vaile. The April 2008 Gippsland by-election, resulting from the resignation of the former Howard minister and Nationals MP Peter McGauran, saw the Nationals' Darren Chester retain the seat, receiving a swing of 6%. The Liberals suffered a swing in the September 2008 Mayo by-election resulting from the resignation of former Howard minister and Liberal leader Alexander Downer, and came close to losing the seat to the Greens candidate. The Liberals retained seats at the Bradfield and Higgins by-elections in December 2009. The member for Ryan, Michael Johnson, was expelled from the Liberal National Party on 20 May 2010, reducing the Coalition to 63 seats.

=== Redistributions ===
Since the previous national election in 2007 there had been a number of redistributions. These realignments of electorate boundaries are regularly undertaken by the Australian Electoral Commission and they maintain similar voter numbers in each electorate. They saw Labor's notional number of seats increase to 88 with the coalition's notional number decreased to 59, with independents in three. The swing required by the opposition to win majority government had decreased by approximately 0.1 percent.

The redistribution of electoral divisions for Western Australia made the Liberal-held Swan notionally Labor, and vastly changed Kalgoorlie and O'Connor, with the former being safer for the Liberals, and the latter becoming more marginal. Kalgoorlie was also renamed Durack. The redistribution also damaged the WA Nationals' chances of a House of Representatives seat. Tasmania was also redistributed but, while there were some changes to boundaries, little changed in terms of seat margins.

New South Wales lost a seat to Queensland due to population changes for the second election in a row. The Labor Party suggested the abolition of the marginal Liberal seat of Macarthur, while the Liberal Party suggested that Liberal-held Hume and National-held Riverina be merged to create a new seat called "Bradman" in honour of Sir Donald Bradman. The National Party suggested the abolition of the Labor-held city seat of Banks. The draft New South Wales redistribution, published in August 2009, proposed that Reid be abolished and that Lowe be renamed "McMahon" in honour of former Prime Minister Sir William McMahon. In response to widespread criticism of the abolition of the name "Reid", the finalised redistribution, published in October 2009, instead had Lowe renamed "Reid" and Prospect replaced with McMahon. Boundary changes also resulted in the Liberal seats of Macarthur, Greenway and Gilmore becoming notionally Labor-held, with major changes to other seats, including Calare, Parkes and Macquarie.

In Queensland, the seat of Wright was created as a Liberal-held seat based on the Gold Coast hinterland. The redistribution saw the status of Blair change from marginal Labor to a safe Labor seat. The status of marginal Liberal seats Dickson and Herbert also changed to marginal Labor seats.

A redistribution for Victoria commenced in 2010, but was not finalised before the election was called.

=== Senate ===
In the 76-member Australian Senate, from July 2008 to June 2011, the Labor and Liberal parties hold 32 seats each, and the Liberals' coalition partner, the National Party (including one CLP), five seats. The balance of power rests with the crossbench, consisting of:

- 5 Australian Greens
- 1 Family First, Steve Fielding
- 1 Independent, Nick Xenophon

For a majority, the government requires an additional seven votes from non-Labor senators. If the Liberal Party chooses to vote with the Labor Party, support from the crossbench is not required.

==== Senate terms expiring ====
Forty seats in the Senate were up for election:

- 36 senators representing the six states; each state elected half of its 12 Senate seats. The six-year terms of these 36 senators will start on 1 July 2011; the terms of the existing senators representing the states will end on 30 June 2011.
- 4 territory senators: the ACT and the NT each elected two senators, whose terms started on election day and will expire the day before the next election for the House of Representatives.

The party composition of these 40 senators whose terms will expire is:

- Liberal: 18 (14 ongoing, to expire 30 June 2014)
- National: 2 (3 ongoing)
- CLP: 1 (0 ongoing)
- ALP: 16 (16 ongoing)
- Green: 2 (3 ongoing)
- Family First: 1 (0 ongoing)
- Independent Nick Xenophon: 0 (1 ongoing)

These seats are listed in order of election for the six states and two territories:

NSW	Vic	Qld	WA	SA	Tas	ACT	NT
Bill Heffernan (Lib); Steve Hutchins (ALP); Concetta F.-Wells (Lib); John Faulkner (ALP); Fiona Nash (Nat); Michael Forshaw (ALP)	Michael Ronaldson (Lib); Kim Carr (ALP); Julian McGauran (Lib); Stephen Conroy (ALP); Judith Troeth (Lib); Steve Fielding (FFP)	Brett Mason (Lib); Jan McLucas (ALP); George Brandis (Lib); Joe Ludwig (ALP); Barnaby Joyce (Nat); Russell Trood (Lib)	Chris Back (Lib); Chris Evans (ALP); Mathias Cormann (Lib); Glenn Sterle (ALP); Judith Adams (Lib); Rachel Siewert (Grn)	Nick Minchin (Lib); Anne McEwen (ALP); Mary Jo Fisher (Lib); Annette Hurley (ALP); Alan Ferguson (Lib); Dana Wortley (ALP)	Eric Abetz (Lib); Kerry O'Brien (ALP); Guy Barnett (Lib); Helen Polley (ALP); Stephen Parry (Lib); Christine Milne (Grn)	Kate Lundy (ALP); Gary Humphries (Lib)	Trish Crossin (ALP); Nigel Scullion (CLP)

== House of Representatives opinion polling ==
=== Newspoll ===
The election-eve Newspoll of over 2000 voters reported Labor on a 50.2 percent two-party-preferred vote. A post-election Newspoll taken 27–29 August 2010 of 1134 voters revealed 47 percent wanted a Gillard Labor government, to 39 percent for an Abbott Coalition government, while 14 percent were uncommitted. There was no difference between male and female voters. Ages 18–34 and 34–49 were even stronger for Labor, while those above 50 bucked the trend preferring the Coalition 45 percent to 40 percent.

=== Poll of 28,000 ===
A JWS Research "mega-poll" was conducted by robocall late in the campaign and published by Fairfax. It polled an Australian record of 22,000 voters in 54 marginal seats and a further 6,000 in safe seats. It revealed a national two-party-preferred vote for Labor of 51.6 percent. Losses in Queensland and New South Wales were offset by the gains of Dunkley, McEwen (both 57 percent for Labor), and Cowper and Boothby (both 54 percent for Labor), finishing with a total of 79 Labor, 68 coalition, 3 independent.

=== Two-party-preferred vote ===
The graph shows a timeline of the estimates by three main polling companies – Roy Morgan (green), Nielsen (blue), and Newspoll (red) – of the two-party-preferred vote for Labor from January 2008 to 20 July 2010. The pink dot on the left side represents the actual 2PP vote for Labor in the November 2007 election.

=== Primary vote ===
The graph shows a timeline of Newspoll's estimates of the primary vote for Labor (red), the Coalition (blue), the Greens (green), and other parties or independent candidates (magenta) from 2007 to 2010. The four dots on the left side represent the actual vote for each party in the November 2007 election.

=== Newspoll leader ratings ===
Better Prime Minister^
Date	Labor Gillard	Liberal Abbott
17–19 Aug 2010	50%	37%
13–15 Aug 2010	50%	35%
6–8 Aug 2010	49%	34%
30 Jul – 1 August 2010	50%	35%
23–25 Jul 2010	50%	34%
16–18 Jul 2010	57%	27%
25–27 Jun 2010	53%	29%
	Rudd	Abbott
18–20 Jun 2010	46%	37%
28–30 May 2010	49%	33%
14–16 May 2010	49%	33%
30 Apr – 2 May 2010	50%	32%
16–18 Apr 2010	56%	29%
26–28 Mar 2010	59%	27%
12–14 Mar 2010	55%	30%
26–28 Feb 2010	55%	30%
12–14 Feb 2010	55%	27%
29–31 Jan 2010	58%	26%
15–17 Jan 2010	57%	25%
4–6 Dec 2009	60%	23%
	Rudd	Turnbull
27–29 Nov 2009	65%	14%
13–15 Nov 2009	63%	22%
30 Oct – 1 November 2009	63%	19%
16–18 Oct 2009	65%	19%
28 Sep – 1 October 2009	67%	18%
Polling conducted by Newspoll and published in The Australian.^Remainder were "uncommitted".

Satisfaction^
Date	Satisfied	Dissatisfied	Satisfied	Dissatisfied
	Gillard		Abbott
17–19 Aug 2010	44%	43%	42%	50%
13–15 Aug 2010	44%	38%	43%	46%
6–8 Aug 2010	43%	41%	41%	49%
30 Jul – 1 August 2010	42%	40%	44%	46%
23–25 Jul 2010	41%	37%	40%	46%
16–18 Jul 2010	48%	29%	36%	51%
25–27 Jun 2010	N/A (new)	N/A (new)	42%	41%
	Rudd		Abbott
18–20 Jun 2010	36%	55%	38%	49%
28–30 May 2010	36%	54%	37%	49%
14–16 May 2010	39%	51%	42%	45%
30 Apr – 2 May 2010	39%	50%	45%	43%
16–18 Apr 2010	50%	41%	46%	40%
26–28 Mar 2010	51%	39%	44%	43%
12–14 Mar 2010	48%	41%	47%	38%
26–28 Feb 2010	51%	40%	48%	38%
12–14 Feb 2010	50%	40%	44%	37%
29–31 Jan 2010	50%	38%	41%	39%
15–17 Jan 2010	52%	34%	40%	35%
4–6 Dec 2009	58%	32%	N/A (new)	N/A (new)
	Rudd		Turnbull
27–29 Nov 2009	56%	34%	36%	50%
13–15 Nov 2009	56%	34%	34%	50%
30 Oct – 1 November 2009	59%	32%	32%	51%
16–18 Oct 2009	63%	28%	32%	54%
28 Sep – 1 October 2009	67%	21%	33%	48%
Polling conducted by Newspoll and published in The Australian.^Remainder were "uncommitted".

== Newspaper endorsements ==
=== Australian newspapers ===
Dailies			Sundays	
Newspaper	Publisher	Endorsement	Newspaper	Endorsement
The Advertiser	News Limited	Labor		
The Age	Fairfax Media	Labor	The Sunday Age	Labor
The Australian	News Limited	Liberal	The Weekend Australian	Liberal
The Australian Financial Review	Fairfax Media	Liberal		
The Canberra Times	Fairfax Media	Labor		
The Courier-Mail	News Limited	Liberal National	The Sunday Mail	Liberal National
The Daily Telegraph	News Limited	Liberal	The Sunday Telegraph	Labor
The Herald Sun	News Limited	Liberal	Sunday Herald Sun	Labor
The Mercury	News Limited	Labor		
Northern Territory News	News Limited	Labor		
The Sydney Morning Herald	Fairfax Media	Labor		
The West Australian	West Australian Newspapers	Liberal		

== Results ==
=== House of Representatives ===
House of Representatives (IRV) — Turnout 93.21% (CV) — Informal 5.55%
Party	Votes	%	Swing	Seats	Change
Liberal	3,777,383	30.46	+0.76	44	▼1
Liberal National Party (QLD) (Note: The Liberal National Party was an amalgamation of the Liberal Party and National Party in Queensland. Change is compared to the coalition total in 2007.)	1,130,525	9.12	+0.60	21	▲8
National	419,286	3.43	−0.04	6	▼1
Country Liberal (NT)	38,335	0.31	−0.01	1	▲1
Coalition	5,365,529	43.32	+1.31	72	▲7
Australian Labor Party	4,711,363	37.99	−5.40	72	▼11
Australian Greens	1,458,998	11.76	+3.97	1	▲1
Independents	312,496	2.52	+0.30	4 (Note: The independents were Bob Katter (Kennedy, Qld), Rob Oakeshott (Lyne, NSW), Andrew Wilkie (Denison, Tas) and Tony Windsor (New England, NSW).)	▲2
National (WA) (Note: The National Party of Western Australia prior to and subsequent to the election were not in the federal Coalition agreement. Nationals WA MP Tony Crook stated that he was a crossbencher, and has said: "In every news report and press report we see, my number is being allocated in with the Coalition and it shouldn't be". Thus, the party has been counted separately from the Coalition totals.)	43,101	0.34	+0.20	1	▲1
Others	148,537	1.19	–0.32		
Total	12,402,363			150	
Two-party-preferred vote
Australian Labor Party	6,216,445	50.12	−2.58	72	▼11
Liberal/National Coalition	6,185,918	49.88	+2.58	72	▲7
Invalid/blank votes	729,304	5.55	+1.60		
Registered voters/turnout	14,086,869	93.22			
Source: Commonwealth Election 2010

House of Representatives Government (72) Labor (72) Opposition Coalition (72) Liberal(44) LNP (21) Nationals (6) CLP (1) Crossbench (6) Independent (4) Greens (1) Nationals WA (1)

Popular vote
Labor	37.99%
Liberal	30.46%
Greens	11.76%
LNP (QLD)	9.12%
National	3.43%
National (WA)	0.34%
CLP	0.31%
Independent	2.52%
Other	1.19%

Two-party-preferred vote
Labor	50.12%
Coalition	49.88%

Parliament seats
Labor	48.00%
Coalition	48.00%
Greens	0.67%
National (WA)	0.67%
Independent	2.67%

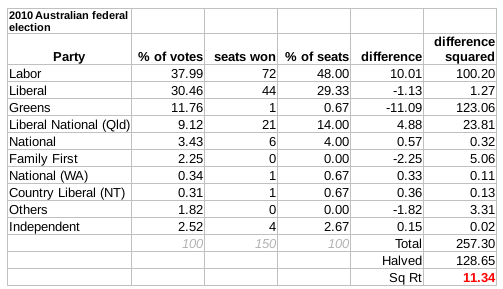
The disproportionality of the lower house in the 2010 election was 11.34 according to the Gallagher Index, mainly between the Labor and Green Parties.

Abbott described the outcome as "the election that no one really won". Labor and the Coalition each won 72 seats in the 150-seat House of Representatives, a loss of eleven and a gain of seven respectively. Labor retained a majority of seats in a majority of states against the Coalition − New South Wales (26 to 20), Victoria (22 to 14), South Australia (6 to 5), and Tasmania (4 to 0), but fell sharply in Queensland (8 to 21) with a pre-existing minority in Western Australia (3 to 11). Labor won its largest two-party preferred vote in Victoria and Tasmania since official two-party records began in 1949, and in South Australia, its fourth-largest.

On the crossbench, one member of the Australian Greens, one member of the National Party of Western Australia and four independent members held the balance of power. After gaining the support of four crossbenchers Labor was able to form a minority government.

On the crossbenches:

- Adam Bandt won the first seat for the Greens at a general election in the seat of Melbourne. He had previously announced he would align with Labor in the event of a hung parliament. On 1 September the Greens declared their support for Labor on confidence and supply.
- Andrew Wilkie, a former Greens candidate and now independent, was elected as the Member for Denison. On 2 September 2010 he declared his support for Labor on confidence and supply.
- Tony Crook won the seat of O'Connor for the National Party of Western Australia, defeating Liberal Party incumbent Wilson Tuckey. There was dispute over affiliation, with some classing Crook as a member of the Coalition and including him in their Coalition totals. The WA National Party subsequently issued a statement saying in part, "The Nationals WA as an independent political party are not bound by the rules of a coalition agreement". Crook says, "In every news report and press report we see, my number is being allocated in with the Coalition and it shouldn't be". The National Party of Western Australia prior to and for more than 20 months subsequent to the election were in no federal Coalition agreement, Crook stated he was a crossbencher, and that he and the WA Nationals were open to negotiating with either side to form government. On 6 September Crook declared his support for the Coalition on confidence and supply, but would otherwise sit on the crossbenches. On 6 May 2012, it was announced that Crook would join the Nationals party room and be formally part of the Coalition.
- Bob Katter, Tony Windsor and Rob Oakeshott, all independents, were re-elected. Both Katter and Windsor were successful at previous elections, while Oakeshott was elected at the 2008 Lyne by-election. All are former members of the National Party, a minor party in the Coalition. However, all three said they would be open to negotiating with either side to form government. They said they would engage in discussion as a bloc but vote individually. On 7 September, Katter declared his support for the Coalition on confidence and supply. Later that day, Windsor and Oakeshott declared their support for Labor on confidence and supply.

A year after the election, The Age summarised the collective positions of the crossbenchers as one of "no regrets"; the exception was Katter, who said that the Coalition had not acted on its commitment to ethanol fuel legislation. Windsor, Oakeshott, and Wilkie became well known because of their importance to the minority government, and had unusual access to the Prime Minister. Crook was less prominent because he did not support the minority government, but both government and opposition sought his backing for issues for which he was a swing vote, such as the Malaysian solution. On 24 November 2011, the Coalition's Peter Slipper replaced Labor's Harry Jenkins as Speaker of the Australian House of Representatives, increasing Labor's parliamentary majority from 75–74 to 76–73. On 21 January 2012 Andrew Wilkie withdrew his support for Labor, changing the majority to 75–73.

=== Senate ===
Senate (STV GV) — Turnout 93.82% (CV) — Informal 3.75%
Party	Votes	%	Swing	Seats won	Total seats	Change
Liberal/National joint ticket (Note: The Liberal and National parties ran a joint ticket in New South Wales and Victoria. It includes the Liberal National Party in Queensland.)	3,740,002	29.40	−1.28	8	17	▼2
Liberal (Note: The Liberals-only ticket ran in Western Australia, South Australia, Tasmania and the Australian Capital Territory.)	1,092,601	8.59	−0.18	9	16	▼1
Country Liberal (NT)	39,268	0.31	−0.01	1	1	Steady
Coalition total	4,871,871	38.30	–1.47	18	34	▼3
Labor	4,469,734	35.13	–5.17	15	31	▼1
Greens	1,667,315	13.11	+4.07	6	9	▲4
Family First	267,493	2.10	+0.48	0	0	▼1
Democratic Labor	134,987	1.06	+0.14	1	1	▲1
Others	1,310,833	10.31	+5.02	0	1 (Note: The independenant senator was Nick Xenophon (South Australia).)	Steady
Total	12,722,233			40	76	
Invalid/blank votes		495,160	3.75	+1.20		
Registered voters/turnout		14,086,869	93.83			
Source: Commonwealth Election 2010

Senate Government (31) Labor (31) Opposition Coalition (34) Liberal (24) LNP (6) Nationals (3) CLP (1) Crossbench (11) Greens (9) DLP (1) Independent (1)

The Senate has 76 seats. Forty seats were up for election; six in each of the six states and two in each of the two territories. The terms of the four senators from the territories commenced on election day, all other terms took effect from 1 July 2011. The Coalition holds 34 seats and Labor holds 31 seats, with the balance of power shifting solely to the Australian Greens with nine seats, after previously holding a shared balance of power with the Family First Party and independent Nick Xenophon. The Labor government required the support of at least eight non-Labor Senators to pass legislation.

Labor and the Coalition incurred swings against them in votes and seats. The Greens received a four percent swing and won a seat in each of the six states at the election, a first for an Australian minor party. John Madigan (Victoria) of the Democratic Labor Party won a seat, while Steve Fielding (Victoria) of the Family First Party lost his seat. Xenophon was not required to stand at this election but would be up for re-election at the next. Minor parties not winning a seat but receiving a notable swing include the Australian Sex Party (+2.0), the Liberal Democratic Party (+1.7) and the Shooters and Fishers Party (+1.4).

== Seats changing hands ==
Members listed in italics did not re-contest their House of Representatives seats at this election. Six notional boundary redistributed seats were contested at this election. Based on booths contested at the previous election, the seats redistributed by the AEC from being marginal Coalition seats to marginal Labor seats – Dickson, Gilmore, Herbert, Macarthur and Swan – were all retained by the Coalition. Greenway was redistributed to become a marginal to fairly safe Labor seat, and was retained by Labor.

Seat	2007			Notional margin (Note: For seats that werre affected by the redistribution the Australian Electoral Commission calculated "notional" margins for the redistributed divisions by modelling the outcome of the previous election as if the new boundaries had been in place.)	Swing	2010		
Seat	Party	Member	Margin	Notional margin	Swing	Margin	Member	Party
Bennelong, NSW	Labor	Maxine McKew	1.40		4.52	3.12	John Alexander	Liberal
Bonner, Qld	Labor	Kerry Rea	4.53		7.35	2.82	Ross Vasta	Liberal National
Brisbane, Qld	Labor	Arch Bevis	6.76	4.60	5.73	1.13	Teresa Gambaro	Liberal National
Dawson, Qld	Labor	James Bidgood	3.21	2.59	5.02	2.43	George Christensen	Liberal National
Denison, Tas	Labor	Duncan Kerr	15.29		N/A	1.21	Andrew Wilkie	Independent
Flynn, Qld	Labor	Chris Trevor	0.16	2.24	5.82	3.58	Ken O'Dowd	Liberal National
Forde, Qld	Labor	Brett Raguse	2.91	3.36	4.99	1.63	Bert van Manen	Liberal National
Hasluck, WA	Labor	Sharryn Jackson	1.26	0.85	1.42	0.57	Ken Wyatt	Liberal
La Trobe, Vic	Liberal	Jason Wood	0.51		1.42	0.91	Laura Smyth	Labor
Leichhardt, Qld	Labor	Jim Turnour	4.01	4.06	8.61	4.55	Warren Entsch	Liberal National
Longman, Qld	Labor	Jon Sullivan	3.57	1.87	3.79	1.92	Wyatt Roy	Liberal National
Lowe, NSW	Labor	John Murphy	7.37	Division abolished				
Lyne, NSW (Note: Mark Vaile (National) had won Lyne at the 2007 election, however he resigned in 2008 and Rob Oakeshott (Independent) won the seat at the resulting by-election.)	National	Mark Vaile	8.58		N/A	12.73	Rob Oakeshott	Independent
Lyne, NSW	Independent	Rob Oakeshott	13.87		−1.14	12.73	Rob Oakeshott	Independent
Macquarie, NSW	Labor	Bob Debus	7.04	0.28	1.49	1.21	Louise Markus	Liberal
Melbourne, Vic	Labor	Lindsay Tanner	4.71		10.75	6.04	Adam Bandt	Greens
McEwen, Vic	Liberal	Fran Bailey	0.01	0.02	5.34	5.32	Rob Mitchell	Labor
O'Connor, WA	Liberal	Wilson Tuckey	16.55	12.76	N/A	3.56	Tony Crook	Nationals (WA)
Solomon, NT	Labor	Damian Hale	0.19		1.94	1.75	Natasha Griggs	Country Liberal
Wright, Qld	New division			3.79	6.36	10.15	Scott Buchholz	Liberal National

== See also ==
- Members of the Australian House of Representatives, 2010–2013
- Members of the Australian Senate, 2011–2014
- Divisions of the Australian House of Representatives
- List of political parties in Australia
- National Tally Room
- Second Gillard Ministry
