= Members of the Australian House of Representatives, 2010–2013 =

This is a list of members of the Australian House of Representatives of the 43rd Parliament of Australia (2010–2013), as elected at the 2010 federal election.

Member	Party	Electorate	State	In office
Tony Abbott	Liberal	Warringah	NSW	1994–2019
Dick Adams	Labor	Lyons	Tas	1993–2013
Anthony Albanese	Labor	Grayndler	NSW	1996–present
John Alexander	Liberal	Bennelong	NSW	2010–2017
Karen Andrews	Liberal National^{[1]}	McPherson	Qld	2010–2025
Kevin Andrews	Liberal	Menzies	Vic	1991–2022
Bob Baldwin	Liberal	Paterson	NSW	1996–1998, 2001–2016
Adam Bandt	Greens	Melbourne	Vic	2010–2025
Bruce Billson	Liberal	Dunkley	Vic	1996–2016
Sharon Bird	Labor	Cunningham	NSW	2004–2022
Bronwyn Bishop	Liberal	Mackellar	NSW	1994–2016
Julie Bishop	Liberal	Curtin	WA	1998–2019
Chris Bowen	Labor	McMahon	NSW	2004–present
David Bradbury	Labor	Lindsay	NSW	2007–2013
Jamie Briggs	Liberal	Mayo	SA	2008–2016
Russell Broadbent	Liberal	McMillan	Vic	1990–1993, 1996–1998; 2004–2025
Gai Brodtmann	Labor	Canberra	ACT	2010–2019
Scott Buchholz	Liberal National^{[1]}	Wright	Qld	2010–present
Anna Burke	Labor	Chisholm	Vic	1998–2016
Tony Burke	Labor	Watson	NSW	2004–present
Mark Butler	Labor	Port Adelaide	SA	2007–present
Anthony Byrne	Labor	Holt	Vic	1999–2022
Nick Champion	Labor	Wakefield	SA	2007–2022
Darren Cheeseman	Labor	Corangamite	Vic	2007–2013
Darren Chester	National	Gippsland	Vic	2008–present
George Christensen	Liberal National^{[2]}	Dawson	Qld	2010–2022
Steven Ciobo	Liberal National^{[1]}	Moncrieff	Qld	2001–2019
Jason Clare	Labor	Blaxland	NSW	2007–present
John Cobb	National	Calare	NSW	2001–2016
Julie Collins	Labor	Franklin	Tas	2007–present
Greg Combet	Labor	Charlton	NSW	2007–2013
Mark Coulton	National	Parkes	NSW	2007–2025
Simon Crean	Labor	Hotham	Vic	1990–2013
Tony Crook	Nationals WA^{[6]}	O'Connor	WA	2010–2013
Michael Danby	Labor	Melbourne Ports	Vic	1998–2019
Yvette D'Ath	Labor	Petrie	Qld	2007–2013
Mark Dreyfus	Labor	Isaacs	Vic	2007–present
Peter Dutton	Liberal National^{[1]}	Dickson	Qld	2001–2025
Justine Elliot	Labor	Richmond	NSW	2004–present
Kate Ellis	Labor	Adelaide	SA	2004–2019
Craig Emerson	Labor	Rankin	Qld	1998–2013
Warren Entsch	Liberal National^{[1]}	Leichhardt	Qld	1996–2007, 2010–2025
Laurie Ferguson	Labor	Werriwa	NSW	1990–2016
Martin Ferguson	Labor	Batman	Vic	1996–2013
Joel Fitzgibbon	Labor	Hunter	NSW	1996–2022
Paul Fletcher	Liberal	Bradfield	NSW	2009–2025
John Forrest	National	Mallee	Vic	1993–2013
Josh Frydenberg	Liberal	Kooyong	Vic	2010–2022
Teresa Gambaro	Liberal National^{[1]}	Brisbane	Qld	1996–2007, 2010–2016
Peter Garrett	Labor	Kingsford Smith	NSW	2004–2013
Joanna Gash	Liberal	Gilmore	NSW	1996–2013
Steve Georganas	Labor	Hindmarsh	SA	2004–2013, 2016–present
Steve Gibbons	Labor	Bendigo	Vic	1998–2013
Julia Gillard	Labor	Lalor	Vic	1998–2013
Gary Gray	Labor	Brand	WA	2007–2016
Sharon Grierson	Labor	Newcastle	NSW	2001–2013
Alan Griffin	Labor	Bruce	Vic	1993–2016
Natasha Griggs	Country Liberal^{[1]}	Solomon	NT	2010–2016
Barry Haase	Liberal	Durack	WA	1998–2013
Jill Hall	Labor	Shortland	NSW	1998–2016
Luke Hartsuyker	National	Cowper	NSW	2001–2019
Alex Hawke	Liberal	Mitchell	NSW	2007–present
Chris Hayes	Labor	Fowler	NSW	2005–2022
Joe Hockey	Liberal	North Sydney	NSW	1996–2015
Greg Hunt	Liberal	Flinders	Vic	2001–2022
Ed Husic	Labor	Chifley	NSW	2010–present
Steve Irons	Liberal	Swan	WA	2007–2022
Harry Jenkins	Labor	Scullin	Vic	1986–2013
Dennis Jensen	Liberal	Tangney	WA	2004–2016
Ewen Jones	Liberal National^{[1]}	Herbert	Qld	2010–2016
Stephen Jones	Labor	Throsby	NSW	2010–2025
Bob Katter	Independent/KAP^{[3]}	Kennedy	Qld	1993–present
Michael Keenan	Liberal	Stirling	WA	2004–2019
Craig Kelly	Liberal	Hughes	NSW	2010–2022
Mike Kelly	Labor	Eden-Monaro	NSW	2007–2013, 2016–2020
Catherine King	Labor	Ballarat	Vic	2001–present
Andrew Laming	Liberal National^{[1]}	Bowman	Qld	2004–2022
Andrew Leigh	Labor	Fraser	ACT	2010–present
Kirsten Livermore	Labor	Capricornia	Qld	1998–2013
Sussan Ley	Liberal	Farrer	NSW	2001–2026
Geoff Lyons	Labor	Bass	Tas	2010–2013
Ian Macfarlane	Liberal National^{[1]}	Groom	Qld	1998–2016
Jenny Macklin	Labor	Jagajaga	Vic	1996–2019
Nola Marino	Liberal	Forrest	WA	2007–2025
Louise Markus	Liberal	Macquarie	NSW	2004–2016
Richard Marles	Labor	Corio	Vic	2007–present
Russell Matheson	Liberal	Macarthur	NSW	2010–2016
Robert McClelland	Labor	Barton	NSW	1996–2013
Michael McCormack	National	Riverina	NSW	2010–present
Daryl Melham	Labor	Banks	NSW	1990–2013
Sophie Mirabella	Liberal	Indi	Vic	2001–2013
Rob Mitchell	Labor	McEwen	Vic	2010–present
Scott Morrison	Liberal	Cook	NSW	2007–2024
Judi Moylan	Liberal	Pearce	WA	1993–2013
John Murphy	Labor	Reid	NSW	1998–2013
Shayne Neumann	Labor	Blair	Qld	2007–present
Paul Neville	Liberal National^{[2]}	Hinkler	Qld	1993–2013
Brendan O'Connor	Labor	Gorton	Vic	2001–2025
Ken O'Dowd	Liberal National^{[2]}	Flynn	Qld	2010–2022
Kelly O'Dwyer	Liberal	Higgins	Vic	2009–2019
Deborah O'Neill	Labor	Robertson	NSW	2010–2013
Rob Oakeshott	Independent	Lyne	NSW	2008–2013
Julie Owens	Labor	Parramatta	NSW	2004–2022
Melissa Parke	Labor	Fremantle	WA	2007–2016
Graham Perrett	Labor	Moreton	Qld	2007–2025
Tanya Plibersek	Labor	Sydney	NSW	1998–present
Jane Prentice	Liberal National^{[1]}	Ryan	Qld	2010–2019
Christopher Pyne	Liberal	Sturt	SA	1993–2019
Rowan Ramsey	Liberal	Grey	SA	2007–2025
Don Randall	Liberal	Canning	WA	1996–1998, 2001–2015
Bernie Ripoll	Labor	Oxley	Qld	1998–2016
Amanda Rishworth	Labor	Kingston	SA	2007–present
Andrew Robb	Liberal	Goldstein	Vic	2004–2016
Stuart Robert	Liberal National^{[1]}	Fadden	Qld	2007–2023
Michelle Rowland	Labor	Greenway	NSW	2010–present
Nicola Roxon	Labor	Gellibrand	Vic	1998–2013
Wyatt Roy	Liberal National^{[1]}	Longman	Qld	2010–2016
Kevin Rudd	Labor	Griffith	Qld	1998–2013
Philip Ruddock	Liberal	Berowra	NSW	1973–2016
Janelle Saffin	Labor	Page	NSW	2007–2013
Alby Schultz	Liberal	Hume	NSW	1998–2013
Bruce Scott	Liberal National^{[2]}	Maranoa	Qld	1990–2016
Patrick Secker	Liberal	Barker	SA	1998–2013
Bill Shorten	Labor	Maribyrnong	Vic	2007–2025
Sid Sidebottom	Labor	Braddon	Tas	1998–2004, 2007–2013
Luke Simpkins	Liberal	Cowan	WA	2007–2016
Peter Slipper	Liberal National^{[1]}/Independent^{[4]}	Fisher	Qld	1984–1987, 1993–2013
Stephen Smith	Labor	Perth	WA	1993–2013
Tony Smith	Liberal	Casey	Vic	2001–2022
Laura Smyth	Labor	La Trobe	Vic	2010–2013
Warren Snowdon	Labor	Lingiari	NT	1987–1996, 1998–2022
Alex Somlyay	Liberal National^{[1]}	Fairfax	Qld	1990–2013
Andrew Southcott	Liberal	Boothby	SA	1996–2016
Sharman Stone	Liberal	Murray	Vic	1996–2016
Wayne Swan	Labor	Lilley	Qld	1993–1996, 1998–2019
Mike Symon	Labor	Deakin	Vic	2007–2013
Dan Tehan	Liberal	Wannon	Vic	2010–present
Craig Thomson	Labor/Independent^{[5]}	Dobell	NSW	2007–2013
Kelvin Thomson	Labor	Wills	Vic	1996–2016
Warren Truss	Liberal National^{[2]}	Wide Bay	Qld	1990–2016
Alan Tudge	Liberal	Aston	Vic	2010–2023
Malcolm Turnbull	Liberal	Wentworth	NSW	2004–2018
Bert van Manen	Liberal National^{[1]}	Forde	Qld	2010–2025
Maria Vamvakinou	Labor	Calwell	Vic	2001–2025
Ross Vasta	Liberal National^{[1]}	Bonner	Qld	2004–2007, 2010–2025
Mal Washer	Liberal	Moore	WA	1998–2013
Andrew Wilkie	Independent	Denison	Tas	2010–present
Tony Windsor	Independent	New England	NSW	2001–2013
Ken Wyatt	Liberal	Hasluck	WA	2010–2022
Tony Zappia	Labor	Makin	SA	2007–present

Note: There were no separate caucuses for the LNP or the CLP; members of these parties caucus with either the Liberal or National parties.

^{1} These members caucused with the Liberal Party.
^{2} These members caucused with the National Party.
^{3} The independent MP for Kennedy, Bob Katter, formed Katter's Australian Party on 3 June 2011.
^{4} The LNP MP for Fisher, Peter Slipper, accepted Labor's nomination for the position of Speaker on 24 November 2011 and resigned from the Liberal National Party.
^{5} The Labor MP for Dobell, Craig Thomson, was suspended from the party on 28 April 2012 and the Labor party has indicated he is unlikely to rejoin under any circumstances.
^{6} Tony Crook, the MP for O'Connor and sole member of the Nationals WA in the parliament, initially sat on the crossbenches before joining the National party room on 2 May 2012.
