= Pre-election pendulum for the 2013 Australian federal election =

The following is a pendulum based on the outcome of the 2010 federal election and changes since, including the redistributions of seats in South Australia and Victoria. It is a Mackerras pendulum, invented by psephologist Malcolm Mackerras, which works by lining up all of the seats held in Parliament (71 Labor, 72 Coalition, 1 Green, 1 KAP and 5 independent) according to the percentage point margin on a two-candidate-preferred basis. The two-party result is also known as the swing required for the seat to change hands. Given a uniform swing to the opposition or government parties in an election, the number of seats that change hands can be predicted. Swings are never uniform, but in practice variations of swing among the Australian states usually tend to cancel each other out. Seats are arranged in safeness categories according to the Australian Electoral Commission's (AEC) classification of safeness. "Safe" seats require a swing of over 10 per cent to change, "fairly safe" seats require a swing of between 6 and 10 per cent, while "marginal" seats require a swing of less than 6 per cent. The swings for South Australian and Victorian seats are notional, based on calculations by the AEC.

== Pendulum ==
Government seats
Marginal
| Corangamite (Vic) | Darren Cheeseman | ALP | 50.28 |
| Deakin (Vic) | Mike Symon | ALP | 50.60 |
| Greenway (NSW) | Michelle Rowland | ALP | 50.88 |
| Robertson (NSW) | Deborah O'Neill | ALP | 51.00 |
| Lindsay (NSW) | David Bradbury | ALP | 51.12 |
| Moreton (Qld) | Graham Perrett | ALP | 51.13 |
| Banks (NSW) | Daryl Melham | ALP | 51.45 |
| La Trobe (Vic) | Laura Smyth | ALP | 51.66 |
| Petrie (Qld) | Yvette D'Ath | ALP | 52.51 |
| Reid (NSW) | John Murphy | ALP | 52.68 |
| Lilley (Qld) | Wayne Swan | ALP | 53.18 |
| Brand (WA) | Gary Gray | ALP | 53.33 |
| Capricornia (Qld) | Kirsten Livermore | ALP | 53.68 |
| Lingiari (NT) | Warren Snowdon | ALP | 53.70 |
| Page (NSW) | Janelle Saffin | ALP | 54.19 |
| Grayndler (NSW) | Anthony Albanese | ALP | 54.23 v GRN |
| Eden-Monaro (NSW) | Mike Kelly | ALP | 54.24 |
| Blair (Qld) | Shayne Neumann | ALP | 54.24 |
| Parramatta (NSW) | Julie Owens | ALP | 54.37 |
| Dobell (NSW) | Craig Thomson (Note: This seat is held by an independent MP who was formerly a Labor MP but switched to Independent following allegations of criminal misconduct currently (Aug 2013) before the courts. It has a notional majority of Labor Party voters.) | IND | 55.07 v LIB |
| Kingsford Smith (NSW) | Peter Garrett | ALP | 55.16 |
| Rankin (Qld) | Craig Emerson | ALP | 55.41 |
| Fremantle (WA) | Melissa Parke | ALP | 55.70 |
| Oxley (Qld) | Bernie Ripoll | ALP | 55.77 |
| Chisholm (Vic) | Anna Burke | ALP | 55.78 |
| Perth (WA) | Stephen Smith | ALP | 55.88 |
Fairly safe
| Hindmarsh (SA) | Steve Georganas | ALP | 56.08 |
| Bass (Tas) | Geoff Lyons | ALP | 56.74 |
| Werriwa (NSW) | Laurie Ferguson | ALP | 56.75 |
| Barton (NSW) | Robert McClelland | ALP | 56.86 |
| Richmond (NSW) | Justine Elliot | ALP | 56.99 |
| Braddon (Tas) | Sid Sidebottom | ALP | 57.48 |
| Adelaide (SA) | Kate Ellis | ALP | 57.52 |
| Bruce (Vic) | Alan Griffin | ALP | 57.71 |
| Batman (Vic) | Martin Ferguson | ALP | 57.75 v GRN |
| McMahon (NSW) | Chris Bowen | ALP | 57.81 |
| Melbourne Ports (Vic) | Michael Danby | ALP | 57.89 |
| Griffith (Qld) | Kevin Rudd | ALP | 58.46 |
| Fowler (NSW) | Chris Hayes | ALP | 58.76 |
| Watson (NSW) | Tony Burke | ALP | 59.14 |
| Canberra (ACT) | Gai Brodtmann | ALP | 59.15 |
| McEwen (Vic) | Rob Mitchell | ALP | 59.18 |
| Bendigo (Vic) | Steve Gibbons | ALP | 59.42 |
Safe
| Isaacs (Vic) | Mark Dreyfus | ALP | 60.41 |
| Wakefield (SA) | Nick Champion | ALP | 60.53 |
| Franklin (Tas) | Julie Collins | ALP | 60.82 |
| Jagajaga (Vic) | Jenny Macklin | ALP | 61.15 |
| Ballarat (Vic) | Catherine King | ALP | 61.70 |
| Makin (SA) | Tony Zappia | ALP | 62.00 |
| Throsby (NSW) | Stephen Jones | ALP | 62.11 |
| Blaxland (NSW) | Jason Clare | ALP | 62.23 |
| Lyons (Tas) | Dick Adams | ALP | 62.29 |
| Chifley (NSW) | Ed Husic | ALP | 62.34 |
| Hunter (NSW) | Joel Fitzgibbon | ALP | 62.48 |
| Newcastle (NSW) | Sharon Grierson | ALP | 62.49 |
| Charlton (NSW) | Greg Combet | ALP | 62.67 |
| Shortland (NSW) | Jill Hall | ALP | 62.85 |
| Cunningham (NSW) | Sharon Bird | ALP | 63.17 |
| Corio (Vic) | Richard Marles | ALP | 63.47 |
| Hotham (Vic) | Simon Crean | ALP | 63.96 |
| Holt (Vic) | Anthony Byrne | ALP | 63.97 |
| Fraser (ACT) | Andrew Leigh | ALP | 64.20 |
| Kingston (SA) | Amanda Rishworth | ALP | 64.55 |
| Sydney (NSW) | Tanya Plibersek | ALP | 67.07 |
| Maribyrnong (Vic) | Bill Shorten | ALP | 67.49 |
Very safe
| Calwell (Vic) | Maria Vamvakinou | ALP | 70.06 |
| Scullin (Vic) | Harry Jenkins | ALP | 70.53 |
| Port Adelaide (SA) | Mark Butler | ALP | 70.91 |
| Lalor (Vic) | Julia Gillard | ALP | 72.12 |
| Wills (Vic) | Kelvin Thomson | ALP | 73.53 |
| Gorton (Vic) | Brendan O'Connor | ALP | 73.63 |
| Gellibrand (Vic) | Nicola Roxon | ALP | 74.13 |

Non-government seats
Marginal
| Hasluck (WA) | Ken Wyatt | LIB | 50.57 |
| Boothby (SA) | Andrew Southcott | LIB | 50.62 |
| Aston (Vic) | Alan Tudge | LIB | 50.67 |
| Dunkley (Vic) | Bruce Billson | LIB | 51.04 |
| Brisbane (Qld) | Teresa Gambaro | LNP | 51.13 |
| Macquarie (NSW) | Louise Markus | LIB | 51.26 |
| Forde (Qld) | Bert van Manen | LNP | 51.63 |
| Solomon (NT) | Natasha Griggs | CLP | 51.75 |
| Casey (Vic) | Tony Smith | LIB | 51.86 |
| Longman (Qld) | Wyatt Roy | LNP | 51.92 |
| Herbert (Qld) | Ewen Jones | LNP | 52.17 |
| Canning (WA) | Don Randall | LIB | 52.19 |
| Dawson (Qld) | George Christensen | LNP | 52.43 |
| Swan (WA) | Steve Irons | LIB | 52.53 |
| Bonner (Qld) | Ross Vasta | LNP | 52.82 |
| Macarthur (NSW) | Russell Matheson | LIB | 53.02 |
| Bennelong (NSW) | John Alexander | LIB | 53.12 |
| O'Connor (WA) | Tony Crook | NWA | 53.56 v LIB |
| Flynn (Qld) | Ken O'Dowd | LNP | 53.58 |
| Sturt (SA) | Christopher Pyne | LIB | 53.60 |
| Fisher (Qld) | Peter Slipper (Note: This seat is held by an independent MP, but has a notional majority of Liberal Party voters.) | IND | 54.13 v ALP |
| McMillan (Vic) | Russell Broadbent | LIB | 54.21 |
| Leichhardt (Qld) | Warren Entsch | LNP | 54.55 |
| Dickson (Qld) | Peter Dutton | LNP | 55.13 |
| Hughes (NSW) | Craig Kelly | LIB | 55.17 |
| Gilmore (NSW) | Joanna Gash | LIB | 55.32 |
| Paterson (NSW) | Bob Baldwin | LIB | 55.33 |
| Higgins (Vic) | Kelly O'Dwyer | LIB | 55.40 |
| Stirling (WA) | Michael Keenan | LIB | 55.55 |
| Wannon (Vic) | Dan Tehan | LIB | 55.66 |
Fairly safe
| Goldstein (Vic) | Andrew Robb | LIB | 56.01 |
| Cowan (WA) | Luke Simpkins | LIB | 56.29 |
| Fairfax (Qld) | Alex Somlyay | LNP | 56.95 |
| Ryan (Qld) | Jane Prentice | LNP | 57.16 |
| Mayo (SA) | Jamie Briggs | LIB | 57.29 |
| Kooyong (Vic) | Josh Frydenberg | LIB | 57.45 |
| Menzies (Vic) | Kevin Andrews | LIB | 58.65 |
| Hume (NSW) | Alby Schultz | LIB | 58.72 |
| Forrest (WA) | Nola Marino | LIB | 58.74 |
| Pearce (WA) | Judi Moylan | LIB | 58.86 |
| Flinders (Vic) | Greg Hunt | LIB | 59.14 |
| Cowper (NSW) | Luke Hartsuyker | NAT | 59.27 |
| Indi (Vic) | Sophie Mirabella | LIB | 58.99 |
Safe
| Wright (Qld) | Scott Buchholz | LNP | 60.15 |
| McPherson (Qld) | Karen Andrews | LNP | 60.28 |
| Hinkler (Qld) | Paul Neville | LNP | 60.39 |
| Bowman (Qld) | Andrew Laming | LNP | 60.39 |
| Calare (NSW) | John Cobb | NAT | 60.74 |
| Grey (SA) | Rowan Ramsey | LIB | 61.16 |
| Moore (WA) | Mal Washer | LIB | 61.19 |
| Gippsland (Vic) | Darren Chester | NAT | 61.45 |
| Tangney (WA) | Dennis Jensen | LIB | 62.32 |
| Cook (NSW) | Scott Morrison | LIB | 62.66 |
| Barker (SA) | Patrick Secker | LIB | 63.01 |
| Warringah (NSW) | Tony Abbott | LIB | 63.09 |
| Durack (WA) | Barry Haase | LIB | 63.67 |
| North Sydney (NSW) | Joe Hockey | LIB | 64.06 |
| Fadden (Qld) | Stuart Robert | LNP | 64.19 |
| Farrer (NSW) | Sussan Ley | LIB | 64.51 |
| Wentworth (NSW) | Malcolm Turnbull | LIB | 64.86 |
| Wide Bay (Qld) | Warren Truss | LNP | 65.61 |
| Mackellar (NSW) | Bronwyn Bishop | LIB | 65.72 |
| Curtin (WA) | Julie Bishop | LIB | 66.19 |
| Berowra (NSW) | Philip Ruddock | LIB | 66.20 |
| Mitchell (NSW) | Alex Hawke | LIB | 67.16 |
| Moncrieff (Qld) | Steven Ciobo | LNP | 67.49 |
| Riverina (NSW) | Michael McCormack | NAT | 68.17 |
| Bradfield (NSW) | Paul Fletcher | LIB | 68.18 |
| Groom (Qld) | Ian Macfarlane | LNP | 68.53 |
| Parkes (NSW) | Mark Coulton | NAT | 68.86 |
| Murray (Vic) | Sharman Stone | LIB | 69.58 |
Very safe
| Maranoa (Qld) | Bruce Scott | LNP | 72.89 |
| Mallee (Vic) | John Forrest | NAT | 73.26 |
Crossbench seats
| Kennedy (Qld) | Bob Katter | KAP | 68.34 v LNP |
| Melbourne (Vic) | Adam Bandt | GRN | 55.91 v ALP |
| Denison (Tas) | Andrew Wilkie | IND | 51.21 v ALP |
| Lyne (NSW) | Rob Oakeshott | IND | 62.73 v NAT |
| New England (NSW) | Tony Windsor | IND | 71.52 v NAT |

== See also ==
- 2013 Australian federal election
- House of Representatives results for the Australian federal election, 2010
- Senate results for the Australian federal election, 2010
- Members of the Australian House of Representatives, 2010–2013
- Post-election pendulum for the 2010 Australian federal election
