= Post-election pendulum for the 2010 Australian federal election =

The following pendulum is known as the Mackerras pendulum, invented by psephologist Malcolm Mackerras. Designed for the outcome of the 2010 federal election, the pendulum works by lining up all of the seats held in Parliament, 72 Labor, 72 Coalition, 1 Nationals WA, 1 Green and 4 independent, according to the percentage point margin on a two candidate preferred basis. The two party result is also known as the swing required for the seat to change hands. Given a uniform swing to the opposition or government parties in an election, the number of seats that change hands can be predicted. Swing is never uniform, but in practice variations of swing among the Australian states usually tend to cancel each other out. Seats are arranged in safeness categories according to the Australian Electoral Commission's classification of safeness. "Safe" seats require a swing of over 10 per cent to change, "fairly safe" seats require a swing of between 6 and 10 per cent, while "marginal" seats require a swing of less than 6 per cent.

Government seats (72)
Marginal (27)
Corangamite (Vic)	Darren Cheeseman	ALP	0.41
Greenway (NSW)	Michelle Rowland	ALP	0.88
La Trobe (Vic)	Laura Smyth	ALP	0.91
Robertson (NSW)	Deborah O'Neill	ALP	1.00
Lindsay (NSW)	David Bradbury	ALP	1.12
Moreton (Qld)	Graham Perrett	ALP	1.13
Banks (NSW)	Daryl Melham	ALP	1.45
Deakin (Vic)	Mike Symon	ALP	2.41
Petrie (Qld)	Yvette D'Ath	ALP	2.51
Reid (NSW)	John Murphy	ALP	2.68
Lilley (Qld)	Wayne Swan	ALP	3.18
Brand (WA)	Gary Gray	ALP	3.33
Capricornia (Qld)	Kirsten Livermore	ALP	3.68
Lingiari (NT)	Warren Snowdon	ALP	3.70
Page (NSW)	Janelle Saffin	ALP	4.19
Grayndler (NSW)	Anthony Albanese	ALP	4.23 v GRN
Eden-Monaro (NSW)	Mike Kelly	ALP	4.24
Blair (Qld)	Shayne Neumann	ALP	4.24
Parramatta (NSW)	Julie Owens	ALP	4.37
Dobell (NSW)	Craig Thomson	ALP	5.07
Kingsford Smith (NSW)	Peter Garrett	ALP	5.16
McEwen (Vic)	Rob Mitchell	ALP	5.32
Rankin (Qld)	Craig Emerson	ALP	5.41
Hindmarsh (SA)	Steve Georganas	ALP	5.70
Fremantle (WA)	Melissa Parke	ALP	5.70
Oxley (Qld)	Bernie Ripoll	ALP	5.77
Perth (WA)	Stephen Smith	ALP	5.88
Fairly safe (16)
Chisholm (Vic)	Anna Burke	ALP	6.11
Bass (Tas)	Geoff Lyons	ALP	6.74
Werriwa (NSW)	Laurie Ferguson	ALP	6.75
Barton (NSW)	Robert McClelland	ALP	6.86
Richmond (NSW)	Justine Elliot	ALP	6.99
Braddon (Tas)	Sid Sidebottom	ALP	7.48
Melbourne Ports (Vic)	Michael Danby	ALP	7.56
Adelaide (SA)	Kate Ellis	ALP	7.69
McMahon (NSW)	Chris Bowen	ALP	7.81
Batman (Vic)	Martin Ferguson	ALP	7.86 v GRN
Bruce (Vic)	Alan Griffin	ALP	8.12
Griffith (Qld)	Kevin Rudd	ALP	8.46
Fowler (NSW)	Chris Hayes	ALP	8.76
Watson (NSW)	Tony Burke	ALP	9.14
Canberra (ACT)	Gai Brodtmann	ALP	9.15
Bendigo (Vic)	Steve Gibbons	ALP	9.53
Safe (23)
Franklin (Tas)	Julie Collins	ALP	10.82
Isaacs (Vic)	Mark Dreyfus	ALP	11.02
Jagajaga (Vic)	Jenny Macklin	ALP	11.52
Ballarat (Vic)	Catherine King	ALP	11.70
Wakefield (SA)	Nick Champion	ALP	11.95
Throsby (NSW)	Stephen Jones	ALP	12.11
Makin (SA)	Tony Zappia	ALP	12.20
Blaxland (NSW)	Jason Clare	ALP	12.23
Lyons (Tas)	Dick Adams	ALP	12.29
Chifley (NSW)	Ed Husic	ALP	12.34
Hunter (NSW)	Joel Fitzgibbon	ALP	12.48
Newcastle (NSW)	Sharon Grierson	ALP	12.49
Charlton (NSW)	Greg Combet	ALP	12.67
Shortland (NSW)	Jill Hall	ALP	12.85
Cunningham (NSW)	Sharon Bird	ALP	13.17
Holt (Vic)	Anthony Byrne	ALP	13.23
Hotham (Vic)	Simon Crean	ALP	13.50
Kingston (SA)	Amanda Rishworth	ALP	13.91
Fraser (ACT)	Andrew Leigh	ALP	14.20
Corio (Vic)	Richard Marles	ALP	14.22
Maribyrnong (Vic)	Bill Shorten	ALP	16.86
Sydney (NSW)	Tanya Plibersek	ALP	17.07
Calwell (Vic)	Maria Vamvakinou	ALP	19.72
Very safe (6)
Port Adelaide (SA)	Mark Butler	ALP	20.03
Lalor (Vic)	Julia Gillard	ALP	22.15
Gorton (Vic)	Brendan O'Connor	ALP	22.16
Scullin (Vic)	Harry Jenkins	ALP	22.25
Wills (Vic)	Kelvin Thomson	ALP	22.64
Gellibrand (Vic)	Nicola Roxon	ALP	23.90
Crossbench seats (confidence and supply) (4)
Denison (Tas)	Andrew Wilkie	IND	1.21 v ALP
Melbourne (Vic)	Adam Bandt	GRN	6.04 v ALP
Lyne (NSW)	Rob Oakeshott	IND	12.73 v NAT
New England (NSW)	Tony Windsor	IND	21.52 v NAT

Opposition seats (72)
Marginal (27)
Hasluck (WA)	Ken Wyatt	LIB	0.57
Boothby (SA)	Andrew Southcott	LIB	0.75
Dunkley (Vic)	Bruce Billson	LIB	1.02
Brisbane (Qld)	Teresa Gambaro	LNP	1.13
Macquarie (NSW)	Louise Markus	LIB	1.26
Forde (Qld)	Bert van Manen	LNP	1.63
Solomon (NT)	Natasha Griggs	CLP	1.75
Aston (Vic)	Alan Tudge	LIB	1.76
Longman (Qld)	Wyatt Roy	LNP	1.92
Herbert (Qld)	Ewen Jones	LNP	2.17
Canning (WA)	Don Randall	LIB	2.19
Dawson (Qld)	George Christensen	LNP	2.43
Swan (WA)	Steve Irons	LIB	2.53
Bonner (Qld)	Ross Vasta	LNP	2.82
Macarthur (NSW)	Russell Matheson	LIB	3.02
Bennelong (NSW)	John Alexander	LIB	3.12
Sturt (SA)	Christopher Pyne	LIB	3.43
Flynn (Qld)	Ken O'Dowd	LNP	3.58
Fisher (Qld)	Peter Slipper	LNP	4.13
Casey (Vic)	Tony Smith	LIB	4.18
McMillan (Vic)	Russell Broadbent	LIB	4.41
Leichhardt (Qld)	Warren Entsch	LNP	4.55
Dickson (Qld)	Peter Dutton	LNP	5.13
Hughes (NSW)	Craig Kelly	LIB	5.17
Gilmore (NSW)	Joanna Gash	LIB	5.32
Paterson (NSW)	Bob Baldwin	LIB	5.33
Stirling (WA)	Michael Keenan	LIB	5.55
Fairly safe (15)
Cowan (WA)	Luke Simpkins	LIB	6.29
Goldstein (Vic)	Andrew Robb	LIB	6.47
Higgins (Vic)	Kelly O'Dwyer	LIB	6.75
Fairfax (Qld)	Alex Somlyay	LNP	6.95
Ryan (Qld)	Jane Prentice	LNP	7.16
Wannon (Vic)	Dan Tehan	LIB	7.29
Mayo (SA)	Jamie Briggs	LIB	7.35
Kooyong (Vic)	Josh Frydenberg	LIB	7.55
Menzies (Vic)	Kevin Andrews	LIB	8.72
Hume (NSW)	Alby Schultz	LIB	8.72
Forrest (WA)	Nola Marino	LIB	8.74
Pearce (WA)	Judi Moylan	LIB	8.86
Flinders (Vic)	Greg Hunt	LIB	9.11
Cowper (NSW)	Luke Hartsuyker	NAT	9.27
Indi (Vic)	Sophie Mirabella	LIB	9.94
Safe (27)
Wright (Qld)	Scott Buchholz	LNP	10.15
McPherson (Qld)	Karen Andrews	LNP	10.28
Hinkler (Qld)	Paul Neville	LNP	10.39
Bowman (Qld)	Andrew Laming	LNP	10.39
Calare (NSW)	John Cobb	NAT	10.74
Grey (SA)	Rowan Ramsey	LIB	11.16
Moore (WA)	Mal Washer	LIB	11.19
Gippsland (Vic)	Darren Chester	NAT	11.45
Tangney (WA)	Dennis Jensen	LIB	12.32
Cook (NSW)	Scott Morrison	LIB	12.66
Barker (SA)	Patrick Secker	LIB	12.88
Warringah (NSW)	Tony Abbott	LIB	13.09
Durack (WA)	Barry Haase	LIB	13.67
North Sydney (NSW)	Joe Hockey	LIB	14.06
Fadden (Qld)	Stuart Robert	LNP	14.19
Farrer (NSW)	Sussan Ley	LIB	14.51
Wentworth (NSW)	Malcolm Turnbull	LIB	14.86
Wide Bay (Qld)	Warren Truss	LNP	15.61
Mackellar (NSW)	Bronwyn Bishop	LIB	15.72
Curtin (WA)	Julie Bishop	LIB	16.19
Berowra (NSW)	Philip Ruddock	LIB	16.20
Mitchell (NSW)	Alex Hawke	LIB	17.16
Moncrieff (Qld)	Steven Ciobo	LNP	17.49
Riverina (NSW)	Michael McCormack	NAT	18.17
Bradfield (NSW)	Paul Fletcher	LIB	18.18
Groom (Qld)	Ian Macfarlane	LNP	18.53
Parkes (NSW)	Mark Coulton	NAT	18.86
Very safe (3)
Murray (Vic)	Sharman Stone	LIB	20.35
Maranoa (Qld)	Bruce Scott	LNP	22.89
Mallee (Vic)	John Forrest	NAT	24.41
Crossbench seats (2)
O'Connor (WA)	Tony Crook	NWA	3.56 v LIB
Kennedy (Qld)	Bob Katter	IND	18.34 v LNP
