= Electoral results for the Division of Whitlam =

This is a list of electoral results for the Division of Whitlam in Australian federal elections from the division's creation in 2016.

== Members ==
Member	Party	Term
Stephen Jones	Labor	2016–2025
Carol Berry	Labor	2025–present

== Election results ==
=== Elections in the 2020s ===
==== 2025 ====
2025 Australian federal election: Whitlam
Party	Candidate	Votes	%	±%
Labor	Carol Berry	25,442	38.64	−5.19
Liberal	Nathaniel Smith	17,265	26.22	−0.97
Greens	Jamie Dixon	8,777	13.33	+2.48
One Nation	Sharon Cousins	5,240	7.96	+0.71
Independent	Ben Britton	3,626	5.51	+5.51
Trumpet of Patriots	Angelo Cuda	2,025	3.08	+3.08
Independent	Paddy Moylan	1,205	1.83	+1.83
Independent	Glenn Butterfield	1,185	1.80	+1.80
Libertarian	Raymond Khoury	735	1.12	+1.12
Citizens	Cheryl Ann Hinton	336	0.51	+0.51
Total formal votes		65,836	90.03	−4.79
Informal votes		7,291	9.97	+4.79
Turnout		73,127	56.18	

Results are not final. Last updated on 3 May 2025 at 11:00 PM AEST.

==== 2022 ====
2022 Australian federal election: Whitlam
Party	Candidate	Votes	%	±%
Labor	Stephen Jones	49,218	45.01	−3.79
Liberal	Mike Cains	30,849	28.21	+28.21
Greens	Jamie Dixon	11,779	10.77	+1.56
One Nation	Colin Hughes	7,543	6.90	+6.90
United Australia	Allan Wode	5,886	5.38	−3.46
Liberal Democrats	Michael Wheeler	4,062	3.72	+3.72
Total formal votes		109,337	95.10	+2.35
Informal votes		5,637	4.90	−2.35
Turnout		114,974	91.69	−1.57
Two-party-preferred result
Labor	Stephen Jones	65,683	60.07	−0.84
Liberal	Mike Cains	43,654	39.93	+39.93
Labor hold		Swing	N/A	

Alluvial diagram for preference flows in the seat of Whitlam in the 2022 federal election. indicates at what stage the winning candidate had over 50% of the votes and was declared the winner.

=== Elections in the 2010s ===
==== 2019 ====
2019 Australian federal election: Whitlam
Party	Candidate	Votes	%	±%
Labor	Stephen Jones	50,102	48.80	−3.96
National	Stephen Wentworth	26,145	25.48	+19.04
Greens	Jamie Dixon	9,461	9.22	+0.93
United Australia	Angelo Cuda	9,071	8.84	+8.84
Christian Democrats	Frank Nero	4,214	4.11	0.00
Sustainable Australia	Ken Davis	3,678	3.58	+3.58
Total formal votes		102,671	92.75	−1.84
Informal votes		8,020	7.25	+1.84
Turnout		110,691	93.26	+0.38
Two-party-preferred result
Labor	Stephen Jones	62,541	60.91	−2.81
National	Stephen Wentworth	40,130	39.09	+39.09
Labor hold		Swing	N/A	

==== 2016 ====
2016 Australian federal election: Whitlam
Party	Candidate	Votes	%	±%
Labor	Stephen Jones	51,939	52.76	+8.36
Liberal	Marcus Hewitt	25,870	26.28	−3.36
Greens	Tom Hunt	8,162	8.29	+2.50
National	Jan Mandelson	6,341	6.44	−2.43
Christian Democrats	Susan Pinsuti	4,048	4.11	+1.55
Non-Custodial Parents	Wayne Hartman	2,081	2.11	+1.66
Total formal votes		98,441	94.59	+2.60
Informal votes		5,628	5.41	−2.60
Turnout		104,069	92.88	−0.10
Two-party-preferred result
Labor	Stephen Jones	62,730	63.72	+6.81
Liberal	Marcus Hewitt	35,711	36.28	−6.81
Labor hold		Swing	+6.81	
