= Assistant Treasurer of Australia =

Australian government minister

- Commonwealth Coat of Arms

- Flag of Australia
- Incumbent; Daniel Mulino since 13 May 2025
- Department of the Treasury
- Style: The Honourable
- Reports to: Prime Minister
- Seat: Canberra, ACT
- Nominator: Prime Minister
- Appointer: Governor-General on the advice of the prime minister
- Term length: At the Governor-General's pleasure
- Formation: 6 January 1932
- First holder: Stanley Bruce
- Website: ministers.treasury.gov.au/ministers/daniel-mulino-2025

The Assistant Treasurer of Australia is the minister of state of the Commonwealth of Australia charged with assisting the Treasurer with overseeing government revenue collection, federal expenditure and economic policy as the head of the Department of the Treasury. The current assistant treasurer is The Hon. Daniel Mulino MP, who was appointed by Prime Minister Anthony Albanese in May 2025 following the 2025 Australian federal election. Mulino also serves as Minister for Financial Services.

== List of assistant treasurers ==
The following individuals have been appointed as Assistant Treasurer, or any precedent titles:

Order	Minister	Party	Prime Minister	Title	Term start	Term end	Term in office
1	Stanley Bruce	UAP	Lyons	Assistant Treasurer	6 January 1932	29 June 1932	175 days
2	Richard Casey	UAP	Lyons	Assistant Treasurer	12 October 1934	3 October 1935	356 days
3	Allan MacDonald	UAP	Lyons	Minister Assisting the Treasurer	7 November 1938	7 April 1939	170 days
3	Allan MacDonald	UAP	Page	Minister Assisting the Treasurer	7 April 1939	26 April 1939	170 days
4	Percy Spender	UAP	Menzies	Minister Assisting the Treasurer	26 April 1939	3 November 1939	191 days
5	Arthur Fadden	Country	Menzies	Minister Assisting the Treasurer	14 August 1940	28 October 1940	75 days
6	Larry Anthony	Country	Menzies	Minister Assisting the Treasurer	28 October 1940	26 June 1941	241 days
7	Bert Lazzarini	Labor	Curtin	Minister Assisting the Treasurer	7 October 1941	21 September 1943	1 year, 349 days
8	Les Bury	Liberal	Menzies	Minister Assisting the Treasurer	22 December 1961	27 July 1962	217 days
9	Jim Forbes	Liberal	Menzies	Minister Assisting the Treasurer	18 December 1963	26 January 1966	2 years, 39 days
10	Peter Howson	Liberal	Holt	Minister Assisting the Treasurer	26 January 1966	19 December 1967	2 years, 33 days
10	Peter Howson	Liberal	McEwen	Minister Assisting the Treasurer	19 December 1967	10 January 1968	2 years, 33 days
10	Peter Howson	Liberal	Gorton	Minister Assisting the Treasurer	10 January 1968	28 February 1968	2 years, 33 days
11	Gordon Freeth	Liberal	Gorton	Minister Assisting the Treasurer	28 February 1968	13 February 1969	351 days
12	Reginald Swartz	Liberal	Gorton	Minister Assisting the Treasurer	13 February 1969	12 November 1969	272 days
13	Phillip Lynch	Liberal	Gorton	Minister Assisting the Treasurer	12 November 1969	10 March 1971	1 year, 130 days
13	Phillip Lynch	Liberal	McMahon	Minister Assisting the Treasurer	10 March 1971	22 March 1971	1 year, 130 days
14	Andrew Peacock	Liberal	McMahon	Minister Assisting the Treasurer	27 May 1971	2 February 1972	251 days
15	Victor Garland	Liberal	McMahon	Minister Assisting the Treasurer	21 March 1972	5 December 1972	259 days
16	Frank Stewart	Labor	Whitlam	Minister assisting the Treasurer	15 February 1973	11 November 1975	2 years, 269 days
(15)	Victor Garland	Liberal	Fraser	Minister Assisting the Treasurer	22 December 1975	6 February 1976	46 days
17	Eric Robinson	Liberal	Fraser	Minister Assisting the Treasurer	6 February 1976	20 December 1977	1 year, 317 days
18	Michael MacKellar	Liberal	Fraser	Minister Assisting the Treasurer	25 August 1978	8 December 1979	1 year, 105 days
19	Ian Macphee	Liberal	Fraser	Minister Assisting the Treasurer	8 December 1979	3 November 1980	331 days
20	Tony Messner	Liberal	Fraser	Minister Assisting the Treasurer	3 November 1980	11 March 1983	2 years, 128 days
21	Chris Hurford	Labor	Hawke	Minister Assisting the Treasurer	26 May 1983	24 July 1987	4 years, 59 days
22	Clyde Holding	Labor	Hawke	Minister Assisting the Treasurer	24 July 1987	15 February 1988	206 days
23	George Gear	Labor	Keating	Assistant Treasurer	24 March 1993	11 March 1996	2 years, 353 days
24	Jim Short	Liberal	Howard	Assistant Treasurer	11 March 1996	14 October 1996	217 days
25	Rod Kemp	Liberal	Howard	Assistant Treasurer	14 October 1996	25 November 2001	5 years, 42 days
26	Helen Coonan	Liberal	Howard	Minister for Revenue and Assistant Treasurer	26 November 2001	17 July 2004	2 years, 234 days
27	Mal Brough	Liberal	Howard	Minister for Revenue and Assistant Treasurer	18 July 2004	26 January 2006	1 year, 192 days
28	Peter Dutton	Liberal	Howard	Minister for Revenue and Assistant Treasurer	27 January 2006	3 December 2007	1 year, 310 days
29	Chris Bowen	Labor	Rudd	Assistant Treasurer; Minister for Competition Policy and Consumer Affairs	3 December 2007	8 June 2009	1 year, 187 days
30	Nick Sherry	Labor	Rudd	Assistant Treasurer	9 June 2009	24 June 2010	1 year, 97 days
30	Nick Sherry	Labor	Gillard	Assistant Treasurer	24 June 2010	14 September 2010	1 year, 97 days
31	Bill Shorten	Labor	Gillard	Assistant Treasurer; Minister for Financial Services & Superannuation	14 September 2010	14 December 2011	1 year, 91 days
32	Mark Arbib	Labor	Gillard	Assistant Treasurer	14 December 2011	5 March 2012	82 days
33	David Bradbury	Labor	Gillard	Assistant Treasurer; Minister Assisting for Financial Services & Superannuation	5 March 2012	27 June 2013	1 year, 197 days
33	David Bradbury	Labor	Rudd	Assistant Treasurer; Minister Assisting for Financial Services & Superannuation	27 June 2013	18 September 2013	1 year, 197 days
34	Arthur Sinodinos	Liberal	Abbott	Assistant Treasurer	18 September 2013	19 December 2014	1 year, 92 days
35	Josh Frydenberg	Liberal	Abbott	Assistant Treasurer	23 December 2014	15 September 2015	271 days
35	Josh Frydenberg	Liberal	Turnbull	Assistant Treasurer	15 September 2015	21 September 2015	271 days
36	Kelly O'Dwyer	Liberal	Turnbull	Assistant Treasurer	21 September 2015	19 July 2016	2 years, 341 days
36	Kelly O'Dwyer	Liberal	Turnbull	Minister for Revenue and Financial Services	19 July 2016	28 August 2018	2 years, 341 days
37	Stuart Robert	Liberal	Morrison	Assistant Treasurer	28 August 2018	29 May 2019	274 days
38	Michael Sukkar	Liberal	Morrison	Assistant Treasurer	29 May 2019	23 May 2022	2 years, 359 days
39	Stephen Jones	Labor	Albanese	Assistant Treasurer; Minister for Financial Services	1 June 2022	13 May 2025	2 years, 346 days
40	Daniel Mulino	Labor	Albanese	Assistant Treasurer; Minister for Financial Services	13 May 2025	Incumbent	1 year, 116 days

== List of ministers for financial services ==
The following individuals have been appointed as Minister for Financial Services, or any precedent titles:

Order	Minister	Party	Prime Minister	Title	Term start	Term end	Term in office
1	Joe Hockey	Liberal	Howard	Minister for Financial Services and Regulation	21 October 1998	26 November 2001	3 years, 36 days
2	Nick Sherry	Labor	Rudd	Minister for Superannuation and Corporate Law	3 December 2007	9 June 2009	1 year, 188 days
3	Chris Bowen	Labor	Rudd	Minister for Financial Services, Superannuation and Corporate Law	9 June 2009	24 June 2010	1 year, 97 days
3	Chris Bowen	Labor	Gillard	Minister for Financial Services, Superannuation and Corporate Law	24 June 2010	14 September 2010	1 year, 97 days
4	Bill Shorten	Labor	Gillard	Minister for Financial Services and Superannuation	14 September 2010	27 June 2013	2 years, 290 days
4	Bill Shorten	Labor	Rudd	Minister for Financial Services and Superannuation	27 June 2013	1 July 2013	2 years, 290 days
5	David Bradbury	Labor	Rudd	Minister Assisting for Financial Services and Superannuation	1 July 2013	18 September 2013	83 days
6	Kelly O'Dwyer	Liberal	Turnbull	Minister for Revenue and Financial Services	19 July 2016	28 August 2018	2 years, 40 days
7	Jane Hume	Liberal	Morrison	Minister for Superannuation, Financial Services and the Digital Economy	22 December 2020	23 May 2022	1 year, 152 days
8	Stephen Jones	Labor	Albanese	Assistant Treasurer; Minister for Financial Services	1 June 2022	13 May 2025	2 years, 346 days
9	Daniel Mulino	Labor	Albanese	Assistant Treasurer; Minister for Financial Services	13 May 2025	Incumbent	1 year, 116 days

== Former ministerial titles ==
=== List of ministers for competition policy and consumer affairs ===
The Competition and Consumer Act 2010 (formerly the Trade Practices Act 1974) is administered by the Treasurer through the Australian Competition and Consumer Commission, but was formerly administered by other ministers. The following individuals were appointed as ministers with responsibility for competition and consumer affairs matters:

Order	Minister	Party	Prime Minister	Title	Term start	Term end	Term in office
1	Lionel Murphy	Labor	Whitlam	Attorney-General	19 December 1972	10 February 1975	2 years, 53 days
2	Clyde Cameron	Labor	Whitlam	Minister for Science and Consumer Affairs	6 June 1975	11 November 1975	158 days
3	Sir Bob Cotton	Liberal	Fraser	Minister for Science and Consumer Affairs	11 November 1975	22 December 1975	41 days
4	John Howard	Liberal	Fraser	Minister for Business and Consumer Affairs	22 December 1975	17 July 1977	1 year, 207 days
5	Wal Fife	Liberal	Fraser	Minister for Business and Consumer Affairs	17 July 1977	8 December 1979	2 years, 144 days
6	Sir Victor Garland	Liberal	Fraser	Minister for Business and Consumer Affairs	8 December 1979	3 November 1980	331 days
7	John Moore	Liberal	Fraser	Minister for Business and Consumer Affairs	3 November 1980	20 April 1982	1 year, 168 days
8	Neil Brown	Liberal	Fraser	Minister for Business and Consumer Affairs	20 April 1982	11 January 1983	325 days
9	Barry Cohen	Labor	Hawke	Minister for Home Affairs and the Environment	11 January 1983	13 December 1984	1 year, 277 days
10	Peter Staples	Labor	Hawke	Minister for Consumer Affairs	24 July 1987	15 February 1988	206 days
11	Nick Bolkus	Labor	Hawke	Minister for Consumer Affairs	15 February 1988	4 April 1990	2 years, 48 days
12	Michael Tate	Labor	Hawke	Minister for Justice and Consumer Affairs	4 April 1990	20 December 1991	2 years, 53 days
12	Michael Tate	Labor	Keating	Minister for Justice and Consumer Affairs	20 December 1991	27 May 1992	2 years, 53 days
13	Jeannette McHugh	Labor	Keating	Minister for Consumer Affairs	27 May 1992	11 March 1996	3 years, 289 days
14	Geoff Prosser	Liberal	Howard	Minister for Small Business and Consumer Affairs	11 March 1996	18 July 1997	1 year, 129 days
15	Chris Ellison	Liberal	Howard	Minister for Customs and Consumer Affairs	18 July 1997	9 October 1997	83 days
16	Warren Truss	Nationals	Howard	Minister for Customs and Consumer Affairs	9 October 1997	21 October 1998	1 year, 12 days
17	Joe Hockey	Liberal	Howard	Minister for Financial Services and Regulation	21 October 1998	26 November 2001	3 years, 36 days
18	Chris Bowen	Labor	Rudd	Minister for Competition Policy and Consumer Affairs	3 December 2007	9 June 2009	1 year, 188 days
19	Craig Emerson	Labor	Rudd	Minister for Competition Policy and Consumer Affairs	9 June 2009	20 June 2010	1 year, 97 days
19	Craig Emerson	Labor	Gillard	Minister for Competition Policy and Consumer Affairs	20 June 2010	14 September 2010	1 year, 97 days
(19)	Craig Emerson	Labor	Gillard	Minister for Trade and Competitiveness	5 March 2012	27 June 2013	1 year, 114 days
20	David Bradbury	Labor	Rudd	Minister for Competition Policy and Consumer Affairs	1 July 2013	18 September 2013	79 days

== Assistant ministers ==
The following individuals have been appointed as Assistant Minister for Competition, Charities and Treasury, or preceding titles:

Order	Minister	Party	Prime Minister	Title	Term start	Term end	Term in office
1	Brian Gibson	Liberal	Howard	Parliamentary Secretary to the Treasurer	11 March 1996	15 October 1996	218 days
2	Ian Campbell	Liberal	Howard	Parliamentary Secretary to the Treasurer	11 November 1996	21 October 1998	1 year, 344 days
(2)	Ian Campbell	Liberal	Howard	Parliamentary Secretary to the Treasurer	26 November 2001	7 October 2003	1 year, 315 days
3	Ross Cameron	Liberal	Howard	Parliamentary Secretary to the Treasurer	7 October 2003	26 October 2004	1 year, 19 days
4	Chris Pearce	Liberal	Howard	Parliamentary Secretary to the Treasurer	26 October 2004	3 December 2007	3 years, 38 days
5	David Bradbury	Labor	Gillard	Parliamentary Secretary to the Treasurer	14 September 2010	5 March 2012	1 year, 173 days
6	Bernie Ripoll	Labor	Gillard	Parliamentary Secretary to the Treasurer	5 March 2012	18 September 2013	1 year, 197 days
6	Bernie Ripoll	Labor	Rudd	Parliamentary Secretary to the Treasurer	5 March 2012	18 September 2013	1 year, 197 days
7	Steven Ciobo	Liberal	Abbott	Parliamentary Secretary to the Treasurer	18 September 2013	23 December 2014	1 year, 96 days
8	Kelly O'Dwyer	Liberal	Abbott	Parliamentary Secretary to the Treasurer	23 December 2014	15 September 2015	266 days
9	Alex Hawke	Liberal	Turnbull	Assistant Minister to the Treasurer	25 September 2015	18 July 2016	297 days
10	Michael Sukkar	Liberal	Turnbull	Assistant Minister to the Treasurer	24 January 2017	21 August 2018	1 year, 209 days
11	Zed Seselja	Liberal	Morrison	Assistant Minister for Treasury and Finance	28 August 2018	29 May 2019	274 days
12	Jane Hume	Liberal	Morrison	Assistant Minister for Superannuation, Financial Services and Financial Technology	29 May 2019	22 December 2020	1 year, 207 days
13	Andrew Leigh	Labor	Albanese	Assistant Minister for Competition, Charities and Treasury	1 June 2022	13 May 2025	2 years, 346 days
13	Andrew Leigh	Labor	Albanese	Assistant Minister for Productivity, Competition, Charities and Treasury	13 May 2025	Incumbent	1 year, 116 days
