= Minister for Financial Services =

Australian ministerial portfolio

- Commonwealth Coat of Arms

- Flag of Australia
- Incumbent; Daniel Mulino since 13 May 2025
- Department of the Treasury
- Style: The Honourable
- Reports to: Prime Minister
- Seat: Canberra, ACT
- Nominator: Prime Minister
- Appointer: Governor-General on the advice of the prime minister
- Term length: At the Governor-General's pleasure
- Formation: 21 October 1998
- First holder: Joe Hockey (as Minister for Financial Services and Regulation)
- Website: ministers.treasury.gov.au/ministers/daniel-mulino-2025

The Australian Minister for Financial Services is a ministerial portfolio of the Australian Government. As of May 2025, it is held by Daniel Mulino, who also holds the role of Assistant Treasurer.

The first Minister for Financial Services and Regulation was Joe Hockey, appointed in 1998.

The first Minister for Superannuation and Corporate Law was Nick Sherry, appointed following the Labor Party's win at the 2007 election. The ministry was administered through the Department of the Treasury.

== List of ministers for financial services ==
The following individuals have been appointed as Minister for Financial Services, or any precedent titles:

Order	Minister	Party	Prime Minister	Title	Term start	Term end	Term in office
1	Joe Hockey	Liberal	Howard	Minister for Financial Services and Regulation	21 October 1998	26 November 2001	3 years, 36 days
2	Nick Sherry	Labor	Rudd	Minister for Superannuation and Corporate Law	3 December 2007	9 June 2009	1 year, 188 days
3	Chris Bowen	Labor	Rudd	Minister for Financial Services, Superannuation and Corporate Law	9 June 2009	24 June 2010	1 year, 97 days
3	Chris Bowen	Labor	Gillard	Minister for Financial Services, Superannuation and Corporate Law	24 June 2010	14 September 2010	1 year, 97 days
4	Bill Shorten	Labor	Gillard	Minister for Financial Services and Superannuation	14 September 2010	27 June 2013	2 years, 290 days
4	Bill Shorten	Labor	Rudd	Minister for Financial Services and Superannuation	27 June 2013	1 July 2013	2 years, 290 days
5	David Bradbury	Labor	Rudd	Minister Assisting for Financial Services and Superannuation	1 July 2013	18 September 2013	83 days
6	Kelly O'Dwyer	Liberal	Turnbull	Minister for Revenue and Financial Services	19 July 2016	28 August 2018	2 years, 40 days
7	Jane Hume	Liberal	Morrison	Minister for Superannuation, Financial Services and the Digital Economy	22 December 2020	23 May 2022	1 year, 152 days
8	Stephen Jones	Labor	Albanese	Assistant Treasurer; Minister for Financial Services	1 June 2022	13 May 2025	2 years, 346 days
9	Daniel Mulino	Labor	Albanese	Assistant Treasurer; Minister for Financial Services	13 May 2025	Incumbent	1 year, 117 days

== See also ==
- Treasurer of Australia
- Assistant Treasurer of Australia
- Minister for Competition Policy and Consumer Affairs (Australia)
- Minister for Finance (Australia)
