= Domestic Gas Reservation Scheme Australia 2027 =

The Domestic Gas Reservation Scheme is a planned Australian federal government energy policy initiative announced in December 2025 by the Albanese government. The scheme aims to require liquefied natural gas (LNG) exporters to set aside a portion of their production for the domestic market, with the goal of improving supply security and alleviating rising gas costs for households, businesses, and industrial users. It is scheduled to begin in 2027 after a period of consultation and design development.

== Background ==
Australia is one of the world's largest exporters of natural gas, particularly in liquefied natural gas (LNG) from the east coast. Over the past decade, domestic gas prices have risen significantly due to increased linkage of domestic markets to international export prices and the decline of legacy gas fields such as Bass Strait. Forecasts from energy agencies have warned of potential gas supply shortfalls to domestic users by the late 2020s if no policy action is taken.

Prior to the 2025 announcement, debates over a national gas reservation policy featured in Australian politics, including proposals by opposition parties and policy reviews recommending reforms to ensure adequate local supply.

== Policy Design and Implementation ==
The Domestic Gas Reservation Scheme is a major energy policy initiative announced on 22 December 2025. Under the scheme, liquefied natural gas (LNG) exporters on Australia's east coast will be required to reserve between 15% and 25% of their production for the domestic market once the scheme is fully implemented. The policy is expected to begin operating in 2027 following consultation and detailed design work in 2026.

Government officials, including the minister for climate change and energy and the minister for resources, stated that more affordable and reliable gas supplies would benefit the economy and help protect households from international price spikes. The policy is also intended to maintain energy security as the country transitions to higher renewable penetration, while providing long-term certainty for industries dependent on gas supply.

=== Reservation Requirement ===
Exporters must set aside 15–25% of gas production for domestic supply before LNG is exported. The exact percentage will be determined after formal consultation with industry, trade partners, and stakeholders in 2026. The reservation requirement is expected to be integrated into export permitting, with exporters required to meet domestic supply obligations before receiving export approval.

=== Application to Contracts ===
The scheme is expected to apply prospectively to new export contracts and supply arrangements entered into from the announcement date. Existing domestic and international contracts that were in place before the announcement will not be retrospectively affected.

=== Interaction with Other Mechanisms ===
The reservation scheme is designed to operate in coordination with existing state and federal gas market mechanisms. It is intended to provide national coverage and work alongside reforms aimed at improving domestic gas market transparency and efficiency.

=== Objectives ===
The official objectives of the Domestic Gas Reservation Scheme are:

- Securing affordable gas supplies for Australian households, businesses, and major industrial users.
- Reducing exposure to international price volatility.
- Supporting the transition of the energy grid while maintaining reliability.
- Ensuring sufficient supply to meet forecast domestic demand.

=== Design Principles ===
The scheme is guided by several design principles:

- Respect for existing contracts, ensuring that agreements signed before December 2025 are honoured.
- Flexibility in compliance, allowing producers to meet obligations through commercial arrangements that satisfy domestic supply requirements.
- National scope and coordination with state and territory market mechanisms.
- Promoting downward pressure on domestic gas prices by increasing local supply.
- Supporting long-term investment and contracts in domestic gas markets.

== Reception ==
The scheme has drawn a mixed response:

- Supporters such as the Australian Workers' Union welcomed the policy as a long-sought reform that prioritises Australian users and supports manufacturing competitiveness.
- Chris Bowen, the climate change and energy minister, refereed to the scheme as "historic".
- Critics, including industry groups and political opponents, argue the approach lacks detail, could deter future investment in gas production, and may not fully address root causes of market price issues. Some environmental groups have also criticised the continued focus on fossil fuel policy rather than accelerating the transition to cleaner energy sources.
- Proponents argue that requiring domestic reservation of gas will create downward price pressure and reduce the risk of future supply shortages, particularly on the east coast.
