= Turnbull ministry =

Turnbull ministry may refer to:

- First Turnbull ministry
- Second Turnbull ministry
