= Michaelia Cash =

Australian politician

Senator the Honourable Michaelia Cash
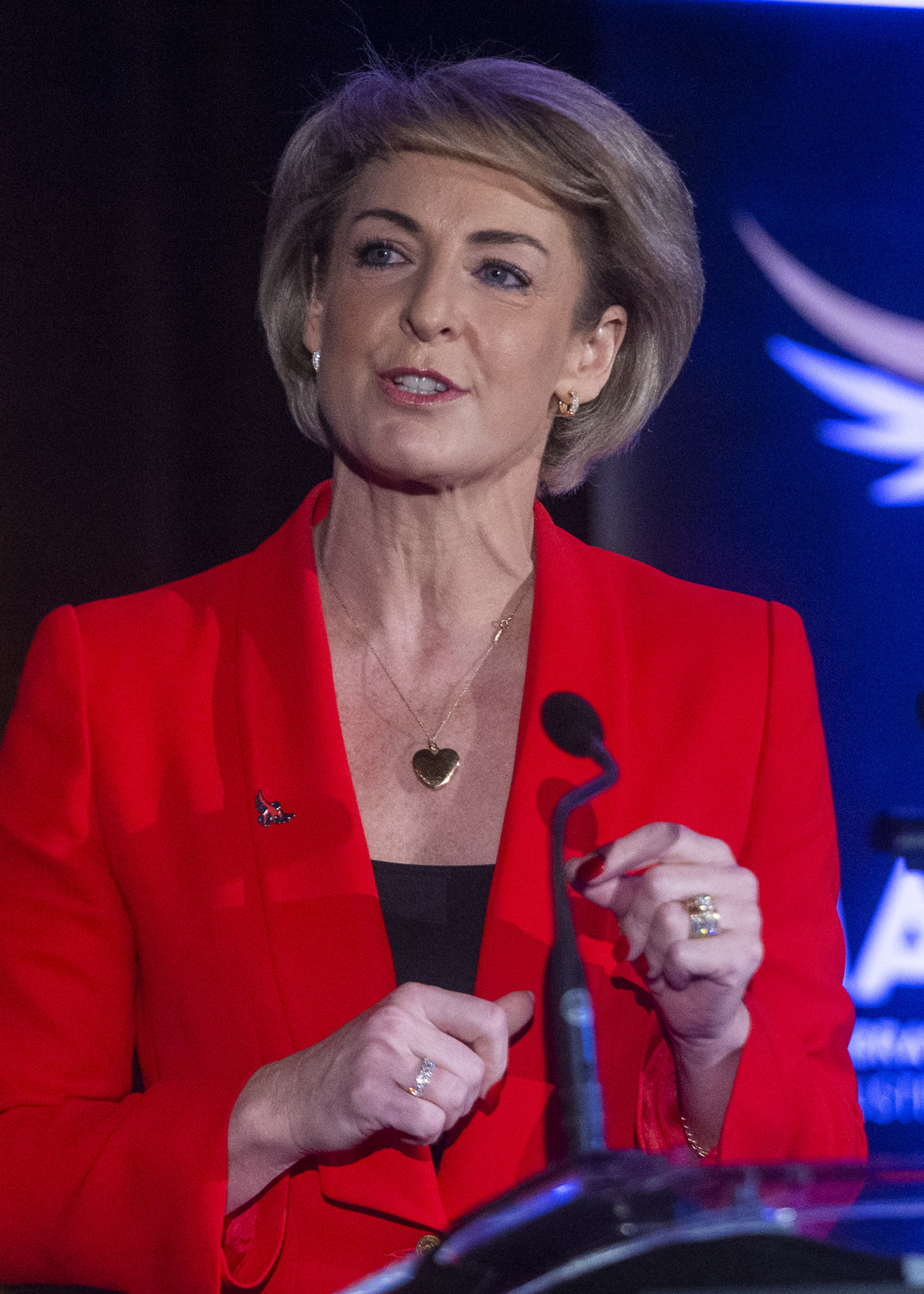
- Cash in 2018

Leader of the Opposition in the Senate
- Incumbent
- Assumed office 25 January 2025
- Deputy: Anne Ruston
- Leader: Peter Dutton; Sussan Ley; Angus Taylor
- Preceded by: Simon Birmingham

Deputy Leader of the Opposition in the Senate
- In office 23 May 2022 – 25 January 2025
- Leader: Simon Birmingham
- Preceded by: Kristina Keneally
- Succeeded by: Anne Ruston

Shadow Attorney-General
- Incumbent
- Assumed office 17 February 2026
- Leader: Angus Taylor
- Preceded by: Andrew Wallace
- In office 18 April 2023 – 3 May 2025
- Leader: Peter Dutton
- Preceded by: Julian Leeser
- Succeeded by: Julian Leeser

Shadow Minister for Trade
- Acting; 30 January 2026 – 12 February 2026
- Leader: Sussan Ley
- Preceded by: Kevin Hogan
- Succeeded by: Matt Canavan

Shadow Minister for Foreign Affairs
- In office 28 May 2025 – 12 February 2026
- Leader: Sussan Ley
- Preceded by: David Coleman
- Succeeded by: Ted O'Brien

Shadow Minister for Employment and Workplace Relations
- In office 5 June 2022 – 3 May 2025
- Leader: Peter Dutton
- Preceded by: Richard Marles (as Shadow Minister for National Reconstruction, Employment, Skills and Small Business); Tony Burke (as Shadow Minister for Industrial Relations)
- Succeeded by: Tim Wilson (as Shadow Minister for Industrial Relations and Employment)
Ministerial offices 2013–2022
Deputy Leader of the Government in the Senate
In office 30 October 2020 – 23 May 2022
Prime Minister	Scott Morrison
Preceded by	Simon Birmingham
Succeeded by	Don Farrell
Attorney-General of Australia
In office 30 March 2021 – 23 May 2022
Prime Minister	Scott Morrison
Preceded by	Christian Porter
Succeeded by	Mark Dreyfus
Minister for Industrial Relations
In office 30 March 2021 – 23 May 2022
Prime Minister	Scott Morrison
Preceded by	Christian Porter
Succeeded by	Tony Burke
Minister for Employment, Skills, Small and Family Business
In office 29 May 2019 – 30 March 2021
Prime Minister	Scott Morrison
Preceded by	Herself (as Minister for Small and Family Business, Skills and Vocational Education)
Succeeded by	Stuart Robert (as Minister for Employment, Workforce, Skills, Small and Family Business)
Minister for Small and Family Business, Skills and Vocational Education
In office 28 August 2018 – 29 May 2019
Prime Minister	Scott Morrison
Preceded by	Craig Laundy
Succeeded by	Herself (as Minister for Employment, Skills, Small and Family Business)
Minister for Jobs and Innovation
In office 20 December 2017 – 23 August 2018
Prime Minister	Malcolm Turnbull
Preceded by	Herself (as Minister for Employment)
Succeeded by	Kelly O'Dwyer (as Minister for Jobs and Industrial Relations)
Minister for Employment
In office 21 September 2015 – 20 December 2017
Prime Minister	Malcolm Turnbull
Preceded by	Eric Abetz
Succeeded by	Herself (as Minister for Jobs and Innovation)
Minister for Women
In office 21 September 2015 – 20 December 2017
Prime Minister	Malcolm Turnbull
Preceded by	Tony Abbott
Succeeded by	Kelly O'Dwyer
Minister Assisting the Prime Minister for Women
In office 18 September 2013 – 21 September 2015
Prime Minister	Tony Abbott
Preceded by	Julie Collins
Succeeded by	Herself (as Minister for Women)

Personal details
- Born: Michaelia Clare Cash; 19 July 1970 (age 56) Subiaco, Western Australia, Australia
- Party: Liberal
- Parent: George Cash
- Education: Curtin University; University of London; University of Western Australia

Michaelia Clare Cash (born 19 July 1970) is an Australian politician who has been a senator for Western Australia since 2008. A member of the Liberal Party, she has served as the leader of the Opposition in the Senate since 2025 and served as a minister in the Abbott, Turnbull, and Morrison governments from 2013 to 2022.

As well as being Attorney-General in the Morrison government, Cash also served as Minister for Industrial Relations from 2021 to 2022, and Minister for Employment, Skills, Small and Family Business and Minister for Small and Family Business, Skills and Vocational Education from 2018 to 2021. Previously, she served in the Turnbull government as the Minister for Jobs and Innovation from 2017 to 2018 and Minister for Employment and Minister for Women from 2015 to 2017.

== Early life ==
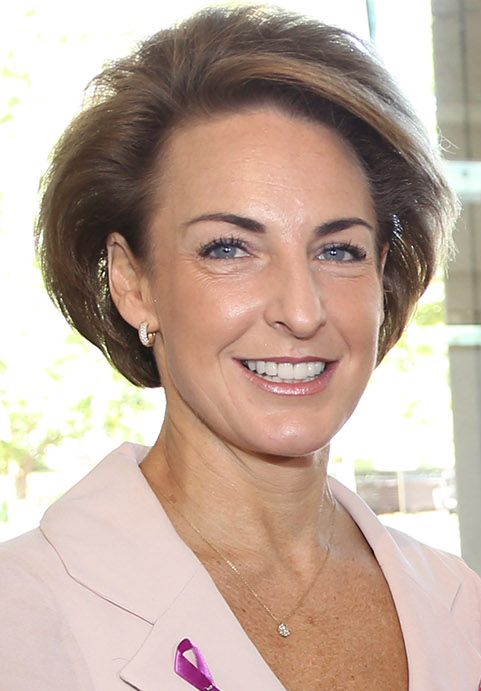
Cash in 2014

Cash was born on 19 July 1970 in Subiaco, Western Australia. She is one of four children born to Ursula Clare Yelland and Samuel Ernest "George" Cash. Her father, the owner of a construction company, was elected to state parliament in 1984 and served as President of the Western Australian Legislative Council. Cash grew up in the Perth suburb of Mount Lawley. She was educated at Iona Presentation College, a Catholic school in Mosman Park.

Cash graduated from Curtin University in 1990 with a Bachelor of Arts with a triple major in public relations, politics, and journalism. She also holds an Honours Degree in Law from the University of London and a Graduate Diploma in Legal Practice from the University of Western Australia. After graduating from Curtin she spent three years backpacking overseas, travelling mostly through Israel, Egypt and Turkey.

Cash joined the Liberal Party in 1988. She was an executive member of the Curtin University Young Liberals from 1988 to 1990 and then the Western Australian Young Liberal Movement where she held numerous positions including State Vice-president. She was a long-time member of the Liberal Party of Western Australia's State Council and was the President of the Moore Division. She has also served on the Party's state executive.

Prior to her political career, Cash was a solicitor with the law firm Freehills where she worked from 1999 to 2008. She practised in all areas of employment and industrial law including industrial relations, employee relations, occupational health and safety, equal opportunity, executive employment and unfair dismissal.

== Political career ==
Cash won preselection for the Liberal Party Senate ticket in 2007 and went on to be elected to the Federal Parliament at the 2007 federal election. She contested the election as the number three candidate of the Liberal Senate ticket in Western Australia.

Since joining Federal Parliament, Cash has served on numerous Senate Committees and held the role of Temporary Chair of Committees from February to September 2010. In September 2010, while in opposition, Cash was elevated to the roles of Shadow Parliamentary Secretary for the Status of Women and Shadow Parliamentary Secretary for Immigration. During this period, Cash was also appointed Deputy Manager of Opposition Business in the Senate.

After the election of the Abbott government in September 2013, Cash was sworn in as the Assistant Minister for Immigration and Border Protection, as well as the Minister Assisting the Prime Minister for Women. Following a leadership change that led to the formation of the Turnbull government, Cash was sworn in on 21 September 2015 as the Minister for Employment, the Minister for Women, and the Minister Assisting the Prime Minister on the Public Service.

In October 2017, the Australian Workers' Union offices were raided by the Australian Federal Police, and media were tipped off prior to the event. Cash advised the Senate Estimates that a staffer of hers found out about the raid from "a media source" and then spread the word to more journalists, having previously denied to an Estimates hearing on the previous day that her office had any involvement. The staffer in question resigned. Cash was ordered to turn over documents in her department relating to the raid. Cash's legal fees for her response to a federal court subpoena were paid for through taxpayer funding. The raids were eventually held to be valid by the Full Federal Court in November 2020.

In a December 2017 ministerial reshuffle, Cash was appointed to the new position of Minister for Jobs and Innovation. The employment portfolio was abolished, while Kelly O'Dwyer assumed responsibility for both the Women and Public Service portfolios.

Cash has been criticised for refusing to release a report into an 18-year-old who died while on a Work for the Dole assignment in April 2016. At the time, Cash promised to release the report within a month; as of April 2018 the final report was not completed, and an internal report to Cash completed in September 2016 had not been released.

Cash offered her resignation from the frontbench on 22 August 2018, during the events of the Liberal Party of Australia leadership spill, 2018. Scott Morrison replaced Malcolm Turnbull as Prime Minister two days later on 24 August 2018. Cash was then appointed the Minister for Small and Family Business, Skills and Vocational Education in the First Morrison Ministry.

In the Second Morrison Ministry, Cash was appointed the Minister for Employment, Skills, Small and Family Business in May 2019. In October 2020, she was additionally appointed the Deputy Leader of the Government in the Senate.

On 29 March 2021, it was announced that Cash would be appointed as Attorney-General and Minister for Industrial Relations in a cabinet reshuffle, replacing Christian Porter, following advice from the solicitor-general that Porter could not remain Attorney-General while taking legal action against the ABC and their reporting on allegations of historic sexual assault. She was sworn in the following day.

Cash would become caught up in the controversy of the 2021 Australian Parliament House sexual misconduct allegations. Having employed Brittany Higgins, who brought forth rape allegations against a fellow member of Linda Reynolds' staff, after Higgins left Reynolds’ office, Cash has been accused of aiding the coverup, following allegations she was aware of the incident and may have mistreated Higgins. Cash rejects claims she knew of the rape allegation while Higgins worked for her, calling for the five-hour recording of her conversations with Higgins be released to the National Anti-Corruption Commission in order for "the public to listen to themselves that five hour recording."

Cash was re-elected as Senator for Western Australia at the 2022 federal election, finishing second overall as the Liberal Party's lead Senate candidate.

In October 2023, Cash spoke on an unsuccessful motion to overturn ACT legislative rights to decriminalise possession laws for some drugs, claiming that tourists will come down the Hume Highway for the “ACT party lifestyle” and can do “about 15 lines” in the ACT because of its laws. Cash's comments were widely ridiculed and followed comments from her ACT Liberal counterparts that the federal government shouldn't interfere with the ACT's laws.

In May 2024, Cash accused then-Labor senator Fatima Payman of supporting terrorists, and probed Penny Wong on whether Payman had been reprimanded for her comments, which included accusing Israel of committing genocide against Palestinians in Gaza during the Gaza war, and Payman's use of the phrase 'from the river to the sea Palestine will be free'.

Cash is a member of the National Right faction of the Liberal Party.

== Personal life ==
Cash is married to Richard Price, a barrister. They met while working together at the same law firm. Price is the brother of late political journalist Matt Price.

Cash was diagnosed with rheumatoid arthritis at the age of 25, which progressed into psoriatic arthritis and ankylosing spondylitis. She was unable to have children due to the associated medication, and "also never wanted to risk passing on a chronic illness to another person".

== See also ==
- Abbott Ministry
- First Turnbull Ministry
- Second Turnbull Ministry
- First Morrison Ministry
- Second Morrison Ministry

Parliament of Australia
Preceded by Ross Lightfoot	Senator for Western Australia; 2008–present	Incumbent
Political offices
Preceded by Julie Collins as Minister for the Status of Women	Minister Assisting the Prime Minister for Women; 2013–2015	Succeeded by Herself as Minister for Women
Preceded by Tony Abbott as Prime Minister	Minister for Women; 2015–2017	Succeeded by Kelly O'Dwyer
Preceded by Herself as Minister Assisting the Prime Minister for Women	Minister for Women; 2015–2017	Succeeded by Kelly O'Dwyer
Preceded by Eric Abetz	Minister Assisting the Prime Minister on the Public Service; 2015–2017	Succeeded by Kelly O'Dwyer
Preceded by Eric Abetz	Minister for Employment; 2015–2017	Succeeded by Herself as Minister for Jobs and Innovation
Preceded by Herself as Minister for Employment	Minister for Jobs and Innovation; 2017–2018	Succeeded by Kelly O'Dwyer as Minister for Jobs and Industrial Relations
Preceded by Arthur Sinodinos as Minister for Industry, Innovation and Science	Minister for Jobs and Innovation; 2017–2018	Succeeded by Karen Andrews as Minister for Industry, Science and Technology
Preceded by Craig Laundy as Minister for Small and Family Business, the Workplace and Deregulation	Minister for Small and Family Business and Skills; 2018–2021	Succeeded by Stuart Robert as Minister for Employment, Workforce, Skills, Small and Family Business
Vacant Title last held by Scott Ryan	Minister for Vocational Education; 2018–2019	Succeeded by Herself as Minister for Employment, Skills, Small and Family Business
Preceded by Kelly O'Dwyer as Minister for Jobs and Industrial Relations	Minister for Employment; 2019–2021	Succeeded by Stuart Robert as Minister for Employment, Workforce, Skills, Small and Family Business
Preceded by Simon Birmingham	Deputy Leader of the Government in the Senate; 2020–2022	Succeeded by Don Farrell
Preceded by Christian Porter	Attorney-General of Australia; 2021–2022	Succeeded by Katy Gallagher
Preceded by Christian Porter	Minister for Industrial Relations; 2021–2022	Succeeded by Tony Burke
Preceded by Simon Birmingham	Leader of the Opposition in the Senate; 2025–present	Incumbent
