= Minister for Small Business (Australia) =

Australian cabinet position

- Commonwealth Coat of Arms

- Flag of Australia

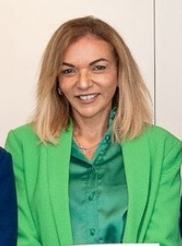
- Incumbent; Anne Aly since 13 May 2025
- Department of the Treasury
- Style: The Honourable
- Appointer: Governor-General on the advice of the prime minister
- Inaugural holder: Barry Jones (as Minister for Science and Small Business)
- Formation: 24 July 1987
- Website: ministers.treasury.gov.au/ministers/anne-aly-2025

The Minister for Small Business is an Australian Government cabinet position which is currently held by Anne Aly following the swearing-in ceremony on 13 May 2025 as a result of Anthony Albanese's Labor government being re-elected at the 2025 Australian federal election.

In the Government of Australia, the minister administers their portfolio through the Department of the Treasury.

== List of ministers ==
The following individuals have been appointed as Minister for Small Business, or any precedent titles:

Order	Minister	Party affiliation	Prime Minister	Ministerial title	Term start	Term end	Term in office
1	John Howard	Liberal	Fraser	Minister for Business and Consumer Affairs	22 December 1975	17 July 1977	1 year, 207 days
2	Wal Fife	Liberal	Fraser	Minister for Business and Consumer Affairs	17 July 1977	8 December 1979	2 years, 144 days
3	Sir Victor Garland	Liberal	Fraser	Minister for Business and Consumer Affairs	8 December 1979	3 November 1980	331 days
4	John Moore	Liberal	Fraser	Minister for Business and Consumer Affairs	3 November 1980	20 April 1982	1 year, 168 days
5	Neil Brown	Liberal	Fraser	Minister for Business and Consumer Affairs	20 April 1982	11 January 1983	325 days
6	Barry Jones	Labor	Hawke	Minister for Science and Small Business	24 July 1987	19 January 1988	2 years, 254 days
6	Barry Jones	Labor	Hawke	Minister for Science, Customs and Small Business	19 January 1988	4 April 1990	2 years, 254 days
7	David Beddall	Labor	Hawke	Minister for Small Business and Customs	4 April 1990	27 December 1991	2 years, 354 days
7	David Beddall	Labor	Keating	Minister for Small Business, Construction and Customs	27 December 1991	24 March 1993	2 years, 354 days
8	Chris Schacht	Labor	Keating	Minister for Science and Small Business	24 March 1993	25 March 1994	2 years, 353 days
8	Chris Schacht	Labor	Keating	Minister for Small Business, Customs and Construction	25 March 1994	11 March 1996	2 years, 353 days
9	Geoff Prosser	Liberal	Howard	Minister for Small Business and Consumer Affairs	11 March 1996	18 July 1997	1 year, 129 days
10	Peter Reith	Liberal	Howard	Minister for Workplace Relations and Small Business	18 July 1997	21 October 1998	3 years, 196 days
10	Peter Reith	Liberal	Howard	Minister for Employment, Workplace Relations and Small Business	21 October 1998	30 January 2001	3 years, 196 days
11	Ian Macfarlane	Liberal	Howard	Minister for Small Business	30 January 2001	26 November 2001	300 days
12	Joe Hockey	Liberal	Howard	Minister for Small Business and Tourism	26 November 2001	26 October 2004	2 years, 335 days
13	Fran Bailey	Liberal	Howard	Minister for Small Business and Tourism	26 October 2004	3 December 2007	3 years, 38 days
14	Craig Emerson	Labor	Rudd	Minister for Small Business, Independent Contractors and the Service Economy	3 December 2007	24 June 2010	2 years, 285 days
14	Craig Emerson	Labor	Gillard	Minister for Small Business, Independent Contractors and the Service Economy	24 June 2010	14 September 2010	2 years, 285 days
15	Nick Sherry	Labor	Gillard	Minister for Small Business	14 September 2010	14 December 2011	1 year, 91 days
16	Mark Arbib	Labor	Gillard	Minister for Small Business	14 December 2011	5 March 2012	82 days
17	Brendan O'Connor	Labor	Gillard	Minister for Small Business	5 March 2012	4 February 2013	336 days
18	Chris Bowen	Labor	Gillard	Minister for Small Business	4 February 2013	25 March 2013	49 days
19	Gary Gray	Labor	Gillard	Minister for Small Business	25 March 2013	27 June 2013	177 days
19	Gary Gray	Labor	Rudd	Minister for Small Business	27 June 2013	18 September 2013	177 days
20	Bruce Billson	Liberal	Abbott	Minister for Small Business	18 September 2013	15 September 2015	2 years, 3 days
20	Bruce Billson	Liberal	Turnbull	Minister for Small Business	15 September 2015	21 September 2015	2 years, 3 days
21	Kelly O'Dwyer	Liberal	Turnbull	Minister for Small Business	21 September 2015	19 July 2016	302 days
22	Michael McCormack	National	Turnbull	Minister for Small Business	19 July 2016	20 December 2017	1 year, 154 days
23	Craig Laundy	Liberal	Turnbull	Minister for Small and Family Business, the Workplace and Deregulation	20 December 2017	28 August 2018	251 days
24	Michaelia Cash	Liberal	Morrison	Minister for Small and Family Business, Skills and Vocational Education	28 August 2018	29 May 2019	2 years, 214 days
24	Michaelia Cash	Liberal	Morrison	Minister for Employment, Skills, Small and Family Business	29 May 2019	30 March 2021	2 years, 214 days
25	Stuart Robert	Liberal	Morrison	Minister for Employment, Workforce, Skills, Small and Family Business	30 March 2021	23 May 2022	1 year, 54 days
26	Julie Collins	Labor	Albanese	Minister for Small Business	1 June 2022	13 May 2025	2 years, 346 days
26	Anne Aly	Labor	Albanese	Minister for Small Business	13 May 2025	Incumbent	1 year, 117 days

== Former ministerial titles ==
=== List of ministers for deregulation ===
Order	Minister	Party affiliation	Prime Minister	Ministerial title	Term start	Term end	Term in office
1	Lindsay Tanner	Labor	Rudd	Minister for Finance and Deregulation	3 December 2007	24 June 2010	2 years, 274 days
1	Lindsay Tanner	Labor	Gillard	Minister for Finance and Deregulation	24 June 2010	3 September 2010	2 years, 274 days
2	Wayne Swan	Labor	Gillard	Minister for Finance and Deregulation	3 September 2010	14 September 2010	11 days
3	Penny Wong	Labor	Gillard	Minister for Finance and Deregulation	14 September 2010	1 July 2013	3 years, 4 days
3	Penny Wong	Labor	Rudd	Minister for Finance and Deregulation	1 July 2013	18 September 2013	3 years, 4 days
4	Craig Laundy	Liberal	Turnbull	Minister for Small and Family Business, the Workplace and Deregulation	20 December 2017	28 August 2018	251 days
