= Daniel Mulino =

Australian politician

The Honourable Dr Daniel Mulino MP
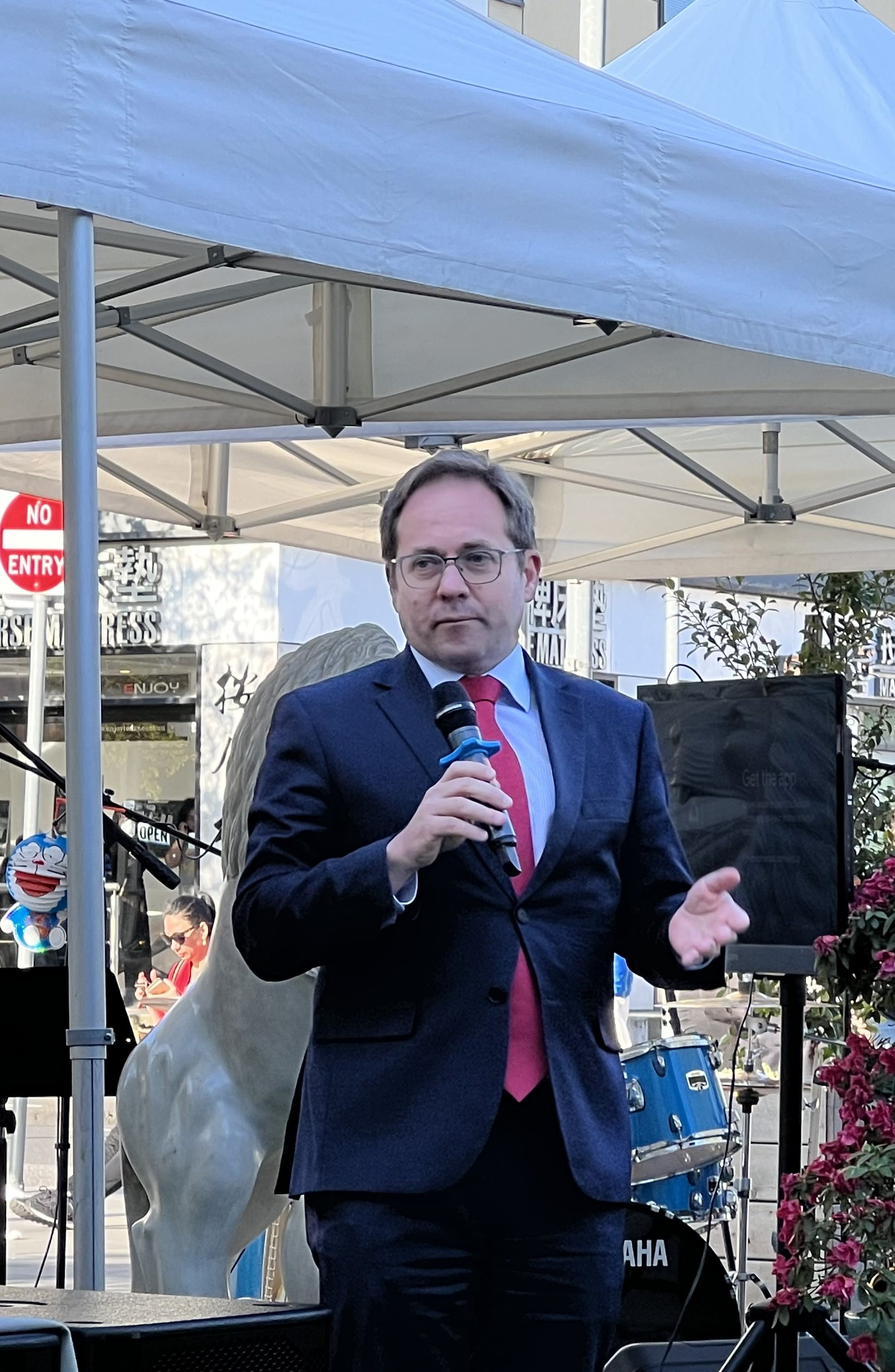

Assistant Treasurer of Australia Minister for Financial Services
- Incumbent
- Assumed office 13 May 2025
- Prime Minister: Anthony Albanese
- Treasurer: Jim Chalmers
- Preceded by: Stephen Jones

Member of the Australian Parliament for Fraser
- Incumbent
- Assumed office 18 May 2019
- Preceded by: New seat

Parliamentary Secretary for Treasury and Finance of Victoria
- In office 4 December 2014 – 24 November 2018
- Premier: Daniel Andrews
- Treasurer: Tim Pallas

Member of the Victorian Legislative Council for Eastern Victoria Region
- In office 29 November 2014 – 24 November 2018
- Preceded by: Johan Scheffer
- Succeeded by: Jane Garrett

Councillor for the City of Casey
- In office 29 November 2008 – 18 November 2010
- Succeeded by: Judy Owen
- Constituency: Edrington Ward

Personal details
- Born: 6 November 1969 (age 56) Brindisi, Italy
- Party: Labor
- Education: Australian National University (BA/LLB); University of Sydney (MEcon); Yale University (PhD Econ)
- Website: danielmulinomp.com.au

Daniel Mulino (born 6 November 1969) is an Australian politician. He was a Labor member of the Victorian Legislative Council, representing the Eastern Victoria Region from 2014 to 2018. In the 2019 federal election he was elected as the inaugural Member for the Division of Fraser. Since 2025, he serves as Assistant Treasurer and Minister for Financial Services in the second Albanese ministry.

== Early life and education ==
Mulino emigrated to Australia with his parents when he was 18 months old, having been born in Brindisi, Italy. His Australian mother had begun her career as a teacher and his Italian father later became a psychiatric nurse in Australia.

His childhood was spent in Canberra, meeting his friend David Smith at Marist College, who would also go on to serve in Federal Parliament. The family were briefly in Sydney, and Mulino studied year 7 at the selective James Ruse Agricultural High School.

Having returned to Canberra, Mulino completed bachelor's degrees in law and arts. While working as a graduate lawyer at the Attorney General's Department and, later, the Department of Finance, he developed an interest in economics, and went on to complete a Masters of Economics at the University of Sydney.

Having won a place at Yale University, Mulino earned a PhD in economics, with a thesis topic "The impact of an aging society on capital deepening and international factor flows." Mulino is one of ten MPs in the 47th Parliament of Australia who possesses a PhD, the others being Anne Aly, Andrew Leigh, Andrew Charlton, Jim Chalmers, Jess Walsh, Adam Bandt, Mehreen Faruqi, Anne Webster and Helen Haines. He went on to teach economics, both at Yale and at Monash University in Melbourne.

== Career as an economist ==
Much of Mulino's career has been spent working in the area of economic policy.

For several years he worked at the Commonwealth Department of Finance and the Attorney-General's Department. He went on to become an adviser to Senator Jacinta Collins, then as Senior Economics Adviser to Victorian Premier Steve Bracks and Commercial Adviser to Victorian Treasurer John Lenders. He has assisted in the Expenditure Review Committee process on two State Budgets.

Mulino later became an economic adviser to financial services minister Bill Shorten in the Rudd-Gillard governments, working on reforms to flood insurance and mitigation strategies following natural disasters in Queensland.

He also worked as a consultant. At points, this has been through the Private Sector Advisory Services Group of the World Bank and the Board of Governors of the Federal Reserve of the United States. Immediately prior to the 2014 Victorian Election, he was Director of Policy at Pottinger, working on projects to advise the government.

== Political career ==
Mulino became politically active as a shop steward while working at Big W during high school and as a student at Australian National University. While at Yale, he was arrested during peaceful protests for the right of graduates to unionise in the US. In his political career he has served as an elected official at the three levels of government in Australia.

Mulino was a councillor, deputy mayor and acting mayor at the City of Casey, resigning in 2010.

He moved to state politics, being elected to the Victorian Legislative Council for Eastern Victoria, 2014. Between 2014 and 2018, he served as Parliamentary Secretary for Treasury and Finance in the first Andrews Ministry. He retired prior to the state election of 2018 to run for a Federal seat.

=== Entering federal politics ===
At the 2018 state election Mulino put himself forward for the new federal House of Representatives seat of Fraser at the 2019 federal election. With the backing of the SDA union he won pre-selection for the Labor Party and then won his seat in the election despite a nominal 5.61% swing against Labor, achieving a two-party-preferred margin of 14.18%.

=== Joining government benches ===
At the 2022 Australian federal election Mulino won 66.5% of the two-party preferred vote in his seat. With Labor now in government, he was appointed to chair the Standing Committee on Economics, which provides oversight to the Reserve Bank of Australia.

Following Labor's re-election at the 2025 federal election, Mulino was appointed Assistant Treasurer and Minister for Financial Services.

== Personal life ==
Mulino won the best speaker award at the World University Debating Championships in 1993 in Oxford.

He met his wife Sarah while volunteering for the Labor Party — "tying ALP balloons to the arms of unsuspecting small children in the Kmart car park." Together, they are raising a daughter. He describes himself as a lapsed Catholic.

Parliament of Australia
Division created	Member for Fraser; 2019–present	Incumbent
