= Carol Berry =

Australian politician

Carol Berry MP

Member of the Australian Parliament for Whitlam
- Incumbent
- Assumed office 3 May 2025
- Preceded by: Stephen Jones

Personal details
- Born: 19 November 1975 (age 50) Wentworthville, New South Wales, Australia
- Citizenship: Australian
- Party: Labor
- Other political affiliations: Australian Greens (formerly)
- Education: University of Wollongong (BA), (LLB), (GradDip)
- Profession: Lawyer; politician
- Website: www.alp.org.au/our-people/our-people/carol-berry/

Carol Berry (born 19 November 1975) is an Australian politician. She is a member of the Australian Parliament for the Division of Whitlam representing the Labor Party after winning the seat in the 2025 Australian federal election.

Berry is a former Greens candidate, when she stood for the New South Wales Legislative Council in the 2003 state election. She was the party's national secretary. She is a local CEO and community advocate.

Parliament of Australia
Preceded by Stephen Jones	Member for Whitlam; 2025–present	Incumbent
