= Nick Sherry =

Australian politician

The Honourable Nick Sherry AO
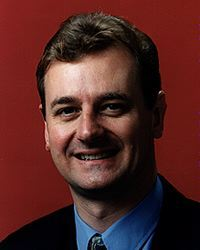

Minister for Small Business
- In office 14 September 2010 – 12 December 2011
- Prime Minister: Julia Gillard
- Preceded by: Craig Emerson
- Succeeded by: Mark Arbib

Senator for Tasmania
- In office 1 July 1990 – 1 June 2012
- Succeeded by: Lin Thorp

Personal details
- Born: 19 November 1955 (age 70) London, England, United Kingdom
- Party: Australian Labor Party
- Education: University of Tasmania

Nicholas John Sherry (born 19 November 1955) is a former Australian politician who served as a member of the Australian Senate for the state of Tasmania from July 1990 until June 2012, representing the Australian Labor Party. Sherry was sworn in as the Assistant Treasurer on 9 June 2009, after serving as the first Australian Minister for Superannuation and Corporate Law. Sherry was the first Assistant Treasurer from Tasmania.

== Early life ==
Sherry was born in Kingston upon Thames, London. He was educated at the University of Tasmania, where he graduated with a Bachelor of Arts in Political Science and Administration. Sherry was also active in the student union while at university, sitting on the Tasmanian University Union and various business committees from 1976 to 1979.

== Union involvement ==
Sherry started his working life as a night cashier and auditor at the Wrest Point Hotel and Casino in Hobart. While working at Wrest Point, Sherry joined the Federated Liquor and Allied Industries Employees' Union and became State Secretary of the then FLAIEU between 1979 and 1990. In 1992, the FLAIEU amalgamated with another union to form the present day Liquor Hospitality and Miscellaneous Union (LHMU).

While State Secretary, Sherry also helped establish the HostPlus Superannuation Fund, an industry superannuation fund then only for hospitality industry workers, but now a full public offer fund with over $7 billion under management. Sherry held the position of trustee of HostPlus from 1987 to 1990 and was also a trustee, manager, and company secretary of ClubPlus Superannuation fund. Sherry held positions on the State Executive of the Tasmanian Trades and Labor Council from 1988 to 1990 and was president from 1988 to 1990.

During his time as State Secretary, Sherry held a number of positions including board member at the College of Hospitality, board member of the Hospitality Group Training and board member of Employment and Skills Formation Council.

== Entry into politics and the Keating Government ==
Sherry was elected to the Senate in 1990, representing Tasmania for the Australian Labor Party. Between 1993 and 1996 he was Parliamentary Secretary to the Minister for Primary Industries and Energy in the Second Keating Ministry.

== Shadow Ministry and opposition ==
After the defeat of the Keating government, Sherry was elected Deputy Leader of the Opposition in the Senate and held many positions in the front bench including Shadow Minister for Finance and Shadow Assistant Treasurer. He also held Shadow Ministries for financial services, banking, superannuation, business regulation, consumer affairs and intergenerational finance.

In October 1997, however, he was accused of improper use of his Parliamentary travel allowance. Although he was later cleared of these allegations, it caused significant distress and he attempted suicide. He was later diagnosed with clinical depression. His suicide attempt again gained media attention after his Labor colleague Greg Wilton committed suicide in June 2000. At the time Sherry was open about his own experiences with depression from which he recovered in 1999.

Sherry took time away from the Shadow Ministry, but returned to the frontbench in 2001 as Shadow Minister for Retirement Incomes and Savings, a position he held until 2004. In 2004 Sherry was appointed as the Shadow Minister for Finance and Superannuation and in 2005 he was appointed as the Shadow Minister for Superannuation and Intergenerational Finance and Shadow Minister for Banking and Financial Services, positions he held until the 2007 election.

== Committee service ==
Sherry has participated on a number of Senate and Joint Parliamentary Committees during his time in Parliament. These include Senate Standing committees on Scrutiny of Bills, Appropriations and Staffing, Privileges and Regulations and Ordinances.

Sherry has also participated on the Senate Legislative and General Purpose Committees for Employment, Education and Training, Rural and Regional Affairs, Economics Legislation Committee and the Finance and Public Administration Committees.

From 1991 to 2003, Sherry was a key member of, and under Labor chaired, the Senate Select Committee on Superannuation. This committee made a number of recommendations on the performance of the superannuation industry including the key Senate breakthrough that led to the introduction of the Compulsory Superannuation Guarantee system.

== Rudd Government ==
On 3 December 2007 Sherry was appointed Minister for Superannuation and Corporate Law in the Labor Government of Kevin Rudd.

As Australia's first Minister for Superannuation, Sherry spoke often about the need to lower fees in the industry to provide better retirement incomes for Australians. This culminated in the Minister setting up the Review into the Governance, Efficiency and Structure and Operation of Australia's Superannuation System, also known as the Cooper Review, after its head Jeremy Cooper. The Cooper Review was the first systemic, in-depth review of the operation, efficiency, cost and performance of Australia's compulsory $1.1 trillion the superannuation system ever conducted. The Gillard Government released the Cooper Review on 5 July 2010.

As Minister for Corporate Law, Sherry held responsibility for the Australian Securities and Investments Commission (ASIC), and oversight of the Australian stock market, during the 2008 financial crisis, when she implemented a range of measures aimed at stabilising aspects of the regulatory system and enhancing the oversight of key market participants. These measures included a legislative ban on naked short selling, improved regulation and disclosure of covered short selling, the introduction of oversight and compliance arrangements for credit rating agencies and the transition of the remaining financial and consumer credit services from the Australian states and territories to the Federal Government.

Sherry also drove key reforms in the provision of financial advice to superannuation members that now enable funds to provide general financial advice.

Sherry also signed several financial services mutual recognition agreements with key Australian partners, including the United States and New Zealand.

Sherry held the portfolio of Minister for Superannuation and Corporate Law until 9 June 2009, at which point he was promoted to Assistant Treasurer.

As Assistant Treasurer Sherry assisted the Treasurer in the development, implementation and administration of policies in the Treasury portfolio, including a specific focus on taxation, tax design and the national tax reform program (known as Australia's Future Tax System review, or the Henry Review), foreign investment matters, productivity reform issues, international economic regulation, international mutual recognition arrangements and global accounting standards.

He established the national Tax Practitioners Board and significantly reformed our Managed Investment Trust law and GST (Goods and Services Tax) administration arrangements.

In 2011, Nick Sherry, the Small Business Minister of the time, received widespread national criticism when he was reported in the national media to have said that internet book sales would soon leave just a few specialist bookshops in capital cities. He said that 'in five years other than a few specialist bookshops...you will not see a bookstore. They will cease to exist because of what's happening with internet-based, web-based distribution.'

Sherry also sat on Cabinet's Expenditure Review Committee responsible for the management of Australia's national annual Budget and also had responsibility for the Productivity Commission, the Australian Bureau of Statistics, the Royal Australian Mint and the Board of Taxation.

== Gillard Government ==
Following the election of Julia Gillard's government, Sherry was appointed Minister for Small Business on 14 September 2010. He was also the Minister Assisting or Deregulation and Public Sector Superannuation and Minister Assisting on Tourism. At the 2011 Labor National Conference Sherry told Gillard he wanted to step down from the cabinet as part of the upcoming cabinet reshuffle.

== Resignation ==
On 12 December 2011, Sherry announced that he would be retiring from the Senate at the 2013 election. He later announced he would resign at the beginning of June 2012, creating a casual Senate vacancy. Lin Thorp won the preselection vote to fill the vacancy caused by the retirement.

== Life after politics ==
On 18 November 2012, it was announced Sherry had been appointed as chairman of FNZ and non-executive director of Citi Australia. He has also held the chairman role at Household Capital, a retirement funding specialist.

In July 2022, Sherry and Doug Cameron were appointed by the Australian Labor Party National Executive as administrators of the Tasmanian branch, following the suspension of the state executive.

== See also ==
- First Rudd Ministry
- First Gillard Ministry

Political offices
New ministerial post	Minister for Financial Services, Superannuation and Corporate Law; 2007–2009	Succeeded by Chris Bowen
Preceded by Chris Bowen	Assistant Treasurer; 2009–2010	Succeeded by Bill Shorten
Preceded by Craig Emerson	Minister for Small Business; 2010–2011	Succeeded by Mark Arbib
