= Craig Emerson =

Australian politician (born 1954)

The Honourable Dr Craig Emerson
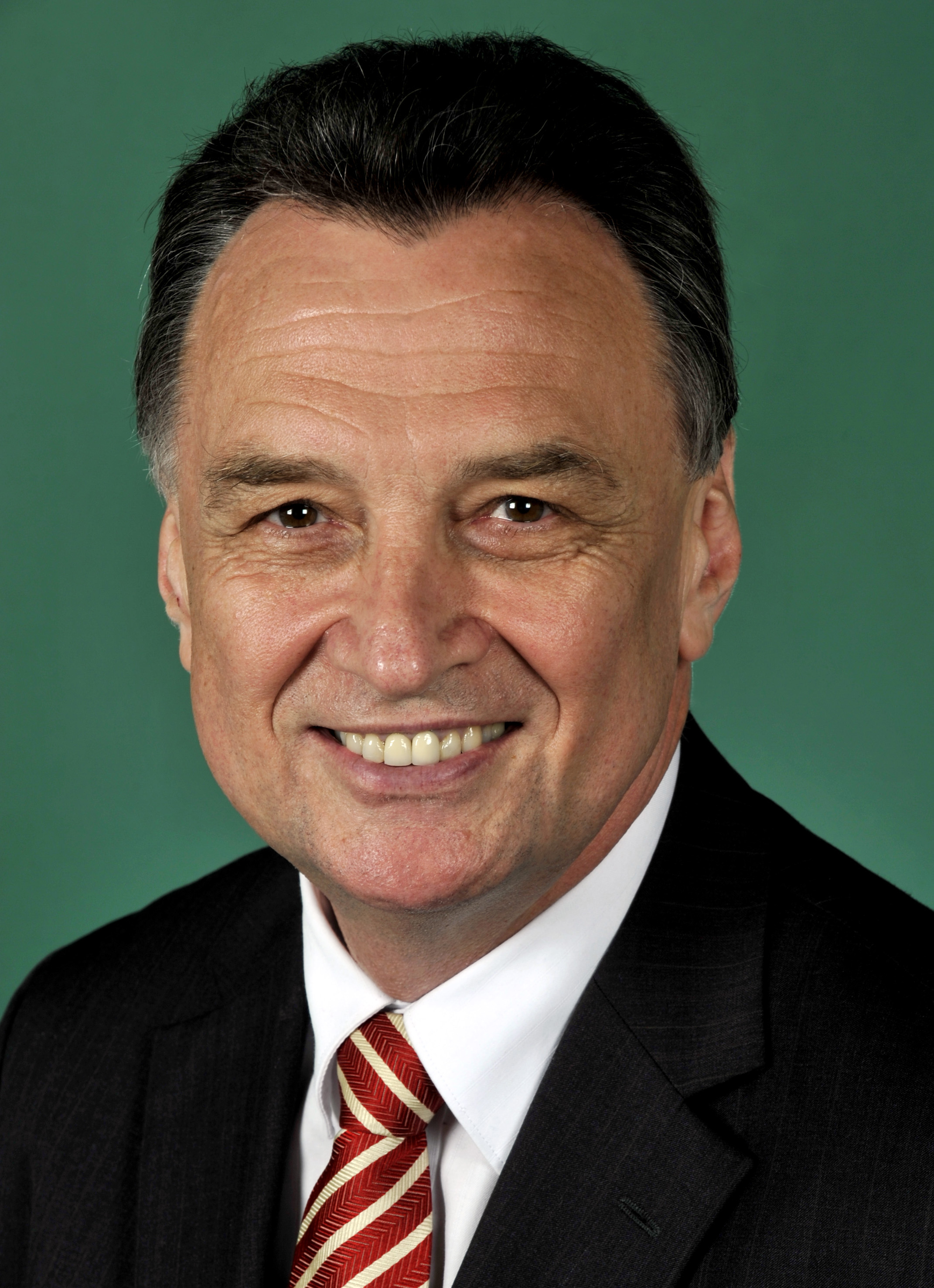
- Official portrait, 2011

Minister for Trade
- In office 14 September 2010 – 1 July 2013
- Prime Minister: Julia Gillard
- Preceded by: Stephen Smith
- Succeeded by: Richard Marles

Minister for Competitiveness
- In office 5 March 2012 – 1 July 2013
- Prime Minister: Julia Gillard
- Succeeded by: David Bradbury

Minister Assisting the Prime Minister on Asian Century Policy
- In office 28 October 2012 – 1 July 2013
- Prime Minister: Julia Gillard

Minister for Tertiary Education, Skills, Science and Research
- In office 25 March 2013 – 1 July 2013
- Prime Minister: Julia Gillard
- Preceded by: Chris Bowen
- Succeeded by: Kim Carr

Minister for Small Business, Independent Contractors and the Service Economy Minister Assisting the Finance Minister on Deregulation
- In office 3 December 2007 – 14 September 2010
- Prime Minister: Kevin Rudd; Julia Gillard
- Preceded by: Fran Bailey
- Succeeded by: Nick Sherry

Minister for Competition Policy and Consumer Affairs
- In office 9 June 2009 – 14 September 2010
- Prime Minister: Kevin Rudd; Julia Gillard
- Preceded by: Chris Bowen

Member of the Australian Parliament for Rankin
- In office 3 October 1998 – 5 August 2013
- Preceded by: David Beddall
- Succeeded by: Jim Chalmers

Personal details
- Born: Craig Anthony Emerson; 15 November 1954 (age 72) Baradine, New South Wales, Australia
- Party: Labor
- Relations: Thomas Emerson (son)
- Education: University of Sydney (BEc, MEc); Australian National University (PhD)
- Profession: Economist, Politician
- Website: Parliamentary website Personal website

Craig Anthony Emerson (born 15 November 1954) is an Australian economist and former politician. A member of the Australian Labor Party, he served as the Australian House of Representatives Member for the Division of Rankin in Queensland from 1998 until 2013. Emerson also served as Minister for Trade and Competitiveness, Minister for Tertiary Education, Skills, Science and Research and Minister for Competition Policy, Small Business and Consumer Affairs in the Rudd and Gillard Governments.

== Early life ==
Emerson was born in Baradine, New South Wales to Ern and Marge Emerson, and raised as a Roman Catholic. He and his late elder brother, Lance, were subjected to physical and emotional abuse from their mother, Marge. He was intensely religious as a child, finding solace from his turbulent home life, recalling that "Catholicism helped me make sense of Mum's volatile behaviour where there was no sense to be made of it." Emerson's father was interred as a prisoner of war during World War II, he died after suffering three heart attacks and hypertension. He earned a bursary to attend St Patrick's College, Strathfield. He later attended the University of Sydney, where he graduated with a Bachelor of Economics (Honours) and a Master of Economics. He also holds a Doctor of Philosophy in Economics from the Australian National University.

== Early career ==
Early in his career, Emerson variously worked as an economic analyst with the United Nations, an economic adviser to the Minister for Resources and Energy and the Minister for Finance Senator Peter Walsh, an Assistant Secretary of the Department of the Prime Minister and Cabinet, and economic and environmental adviser to Prime Minister Bob Hawke. He became Director-General of the Queensland Department of Environment and Heritage in 1990, where he became embroiled in the Cape Melville affair. He was chief executive officer of the South East Queensland Transit Authority from 1995 to 1996.

Following the defeat of the Goss Government in 1996, Emerson set up a small business partnership, Eco Managers, with former economic adviser to Premier Wayne Goss, Raymond Garrand. They advised various clients on electricity supply issues in Queensland and global petroleum companies on energy policy.

== Parliamentary career ==
Representing the Australian Labor Party, Emerson was elected to the Australian House of Representatives as the member for Rankin at the 1998 federal election.

Emerson was appointed Shadow Minister for Innovation, Industry, Trade and Tourism from 2001 to 2003, and then Shadow Minister for Workplace Relations and the Public Service from 2003 to 2004. Emerson was relegated to the backbench following the 2004 Australian federal election, having supported Simon Crean and Mark Latham in leadership ballots against the wishes of his Right faction in Queensland. While on the backbench he wrote a book, Vital Signs, Vibrant Society, proposing new economic and social policies for the Federal Parliamentary Labor Party. Following the election of Kevin Rudd as Leader of the Labor Party and Julia Gillard as Deputy Leader in December 2006, Emerson was appointed Shadow Minister for the Service Economy, Small Business and Independent Contractors.

On 3 December 2007, Emerson was named Minister for Small Business, Independent Contractors and the Service Economy and Minister Assisting the Finance Minister on Deregulation in the newly elected Rudd ministry. In June 2009, he was also appointed Minister for Competition Policy and Consumer Affairs.

On 14 September 2010, Emerson was appointed the Minister for Trade, expanded to Minister for Trade and Competitiveness in a ministerial reshuffle announced on 2 March 2012. On 28 October 2012, the Gillard Government released a White paper on Australia in the Asian Century of which Emerson was the architect. On the same day Emerson was assigned the role of Minister Assisting the Prime Minister on Asian Century Policy.

In 2012, Emerson went viral on the internet for signing a tune about Whyalla staying resilient once the carbon tax comes into effect. It was set to the tune of Skyhooks' "Horror Movie".

In March 2013, in a further reshuffle of ministerial responsibilities, Emerson gained an additional portfolio as Minister for Tertiary Education, Skills, Science and Research. However, after a leadership change in the federal Australian Labor Party in June 2013 in which Kevin Rudd took over as prime minister from Gillard, Emerson resigned his ministerial portfolios and said he would not contest his seat at the next election. Following the Australian federal election held a few months later in September 2013, Jim Chalmers took over from Emerson as the MP for the seat of Rankin in Queensland.

== Post-parliament ==
After leaving parliament, Emerson established an economic consulting firm, Craig Emerson Economics Pty Ltd. His clients have included Wesfarmers, Coles, AGL Energy, Santos, the BCA, the ACTU and the PNG Government. Emerson is an adviser to KPMG. He was also a regular presenter on Sky News Australia for some years after leaving parliament.

In 2014, Emerson was appointed an adjunct professor of Victoria University. He was also a member of the CEDA Council on Economic Policy and chair of the advisory board, Centre for Transformative Innovation, Swinburne University of Technology. Emerson was also President of the Australia China Business Council NSW and a board member of Obesity Australia.

In February 2018, Emerson's memoir, The Boy from Baradine, was published by Scribe Publications.'

In August 2018, Emerson was involved in public disagreement with Sky News Australia when he resigned in protest as a commentator for the TV network when Sky News broadcast an interview with the right-wing Australian activist Blair Cottrell. Emerson said that, "My father fought Nazis in World War II and was interred in a German POW camp." Explaining his decision on Twitter, he said that the decision by Sky News to screen the interview with Cottrell was "another step in a journey to normalising racism and bigotry in our country."

In November 2018, Emerson was appointed Distinguished Fellow at the Australian National University. In March 2019, Emerson was appointed Director of the Australian APEC Study Centre at RMIT University. Emerson was also chair of the McKell Institute and The Australian Alliance for Animals.

On the subject of Australia-China relations, Craig Emerson consistently argued prior to 2022 that the poor relationship was partly caused by Australia. In September 2023, Emerson led The Australian delegation of the resumed High Level leadership Dialogue to Beijing, where he also met with China's foreign minister Wang Yi.

Emerson and former South Australian premier, Jay Weatherill, assisted by Lenda Onsalem, John Graham and senators Anthony Chisholm and Linda White, conducted the ALP's review of the 2019 federal election loss. Newly elected Labor leader, Anthony Albanese, referred to the Emerson-Weatherill report as a blueprint for the 2022 election campaign. Emerson was also a panellist assisting Greg Combet and Lenda Onsalem in the review of Labor's successful 2022 election campaign.

Following the election of the Albanese government, Emerson was appointed chair of the Australia Political Exchange Council.

In late-2022, small business minister, the Hon Julie Collins MP, commissioned Emerson to conduct a Statutory Review of the Payment Times Report Act 2020, making recommendations to improve the payment times of large businesses to their small business suppliers. The report was given to The Australian government in June 2023.

In September 2023, Emerson was appointed by trade minister, Don Farrell, to the Australian government's Trade 2040 Taskforce to advise the government on its trade policy agenda to the year 2040.

In January 2024, Emerson was appointed by the Albanese government to lead a review into the Food and Grocery Code of Conduct.

In February 2024, Emerson was appointed a member of the National Competition Council.

== Personal life ==
Emerson's son Thomas Emerson is the co-founder of the Independents for Canberra party and was elected to the Australian Capital Territory Legislative Assembly in 2024.

== See also ==
- First Rudd Ministry
- First Gillard Ministry
- Second Gillard Ministry

Parliament of Australia
Preceded by David Beddall	Member for Rankin; 1998–2013	Succeeded by Jim Chalmers
Political offices
Preceded by Fran Bailey	Minister for Small Business, Independent Contractors and the Service Economy; 2007–2010	Succeeded by Nick Sherry
Vacant	Minister Assisting the Finance Minister on Deregulation; 2007–2010	Vacant
Preceded by Chris Bowen	Minister for Competition Policy and Consumer Affairs; 2009–2010	Vacant
Preceded by Stephen Smith	Minister for Trade; 2010–2013	Succeeded by Richard Marles
Vacant	Minister for Competitiveness; 2012–2013	Succeeded by David Bradbury as Minister for Competition Policy and Consumer Affairs
Vacant	Minister Assisting the Prime Minister on Asian Century Policy; 2012–2013	Vacant
Preceded by Chris Bowen	Minister for Tertiary Education and Science; 2013	Succeeded by Kim Carr as Minister for Innovation, Industry, Science and Research and Minister for Higher Education
