= Chris Bowen =

Australian politician (born 1973)

The Honourable Chris Bowen MP
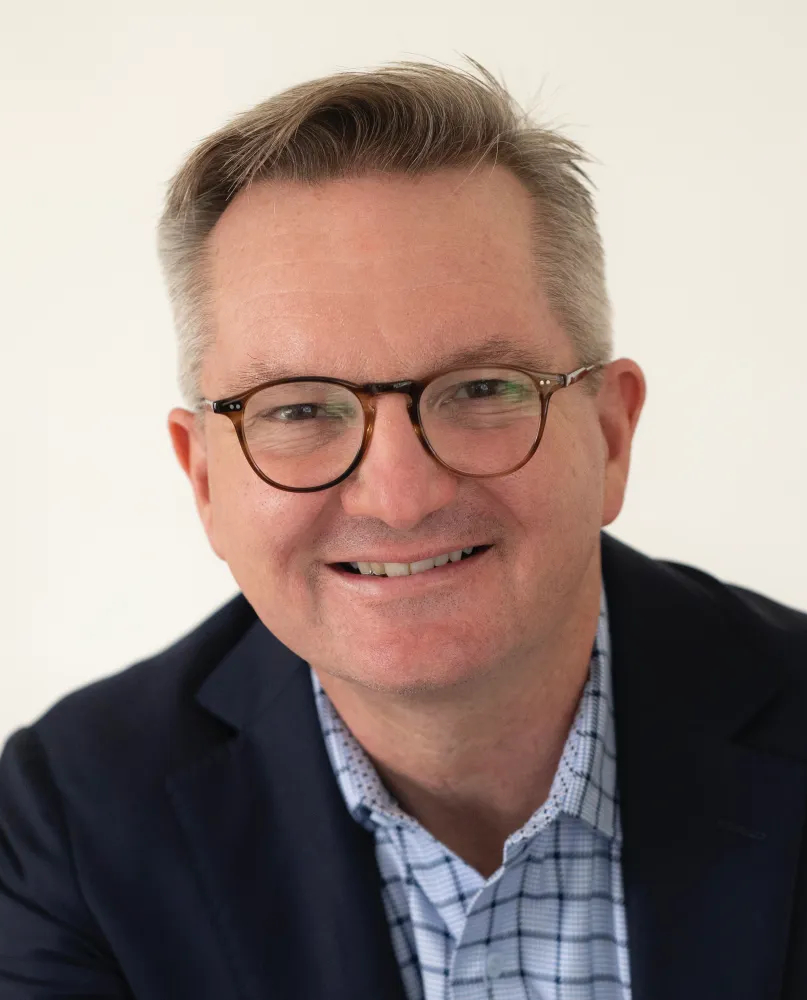
- Official portrait, 2025

Minister for Climate Change and Energy
- Incumbent
- Assumed office 1 June 2022
- Prime Minister: Anthony Albanese
- Preceded by: Angus Taylor (Note: As Minister for Industry, Energy and Emissions Reduction)
Previous offices 2007–2013
Leader of the Opposition
Acting
In office 18 September 2013 – 13 October 2013
Prime Minister	Tony Abbott
Deputy	Anthony Albanese
Preceded by	Tony Abbott
Succeeded by	Bill Shorten
Leader of the Labor Party
Acting
In office 13 September 2013 – 13 October 2013
Deputy	Anthony Albanese
Preceded by	Kevin Rudd
Succeeded by	Bill Shorten
Treasurer
In office 27 June 2013 – 18 September 2013
Prime Minister	Kevin Rudd
Preceded by	Wayne Swan
Succeeded by	Joe Hockey
Minister for Tertiary Education, Skills, Science and Research
In office 4 February 2013 – 25 March 2013
Prime Minister	Julia Gillard
Preceded by	Chris Evans
Succeeded by	Craig Emerson
Minister for Small Business
In office 4 February 2013 – 22 March 2013
Prime Minister	Julia Gillard
Preceded by	Brendan O'Connor
Succeeded by	Gary Gray
Minister for Immigration and Citizenship
In office 14 September 2010 – 4 February 2013
Prime Minister	Julia Gillard
Preceded by	Chris Evans
Succeeded by	Brendan O'Connor
Minister for Human Services
In office 9 June 2009 – 14 September 2010
Prime Minister	Kevin Rudd; Julia Gillard
Preceded by	Joe Ludwig
Succeeded by	Tanya Plibersek
Minister for Financial Services, Superannuation and Corporate Law
In office 9 June 2009 – 14 September 2010
Prime Minister	Kevin Rudd; Julia Gillard
Preceded by	Nick Sherry
Succeeded by	Bill Shorten
Assistant Treasurer
In office 3 December 2007 – 8 June 2009
Prime Minister	Kevin Rudd
Preceded by	Peter Dutton
Succeeded by	Nick Sherry
Minister for Competition Policy and Consumer Affairs
In office 3 December 2007 – 8 June 2009
Prime Minister	Kevin Rudd
Succeeded by	Craig Emerson

Member of the Australian Parliament for McMahon Prospect (2004–2010)
- Incumbent
- Assumed office 9 October 2004
- Preceded by: Janice Crosio
Local government 1995–2004
Mayor of Fairfield
In office September 1998 – September 1999
Preceded by	Anwar Khoshaba
Succeeded by	Anwar Khoshaba
Councillor of the City of Fairfield
In office 1995–2004
Succeeded by

Personal details
- Born: Christopher Eyles Guy Bowen; 17 January 1973 (age 53) Sydney, New South Wales, Australia
- Party: Labor
- Spouse: Rebecca Mifsud (m. 2003)
- Children: 2
- Education: University of Sydney (BEc)
- Website: Personal website

Christopher Eyles Guy Bowen (born 17 January 1973) is an Australian politician who has served as the minister for climate change and energy in the Albanese government since 2022. A member of the Labor Party, he has been the member of Parliament (MP) for the New South Wales division of McMahon (Note: Known as the division of Prospect until 2010) since 2004, and served as a minister in the Rudd and Gillard governments from 2007 to 2013.

Born in Sydney, Bowen graduated from the University of Sydney in 1994 with a bachelor's degree in economics. He served as a councillor of Fairfield City Council from 1995 to 2004, including a term as mayor. Bowen was elected to the House of Representatives at the 2004 federal election, winning the seat of Prospect in New South Wales, later transferring to the seat of McMahon. He was appointed to the shadow ministry by Kevin Rudd in 2006, becoming assistant treasurer and Minister for Competition Policy and Consumer Affairs after the Labor Party's victory at the 2007 election. He continued to serve as a minister after Rudd was replaced by Julia Gillard in 2010, and after Rudd's return as prime minister, until Labor's defeat at the 2013 election.

Bowen served briefly as the acting leader of the Opposition and the acting leader of the Labor Party from September to October 2013 after Rudd's retirement, until Bill Shorten's election at the party's subsequent leadership election. He was the shadow treasurer in Shorten's shadow ministry from 2013 to 2019, until Shorten's retirement after another defeat at the 2019 election. He announced himself as a candidate for the subsequent leadership election but withdrew, allowing Anthony Albanese to become leader unopposed. After the ALP's victory in the 2022 election, Bowen became Minister for Climate Change and Energy in the Albanese government since 2022, and was appointed President of Negotiations for the COP31 UN Climate Change Summit. He is regarded as a senior figure in the Labor Right faction.

== Early life and background ==
Bowen was born on 17 January 1973 in Sydney to Christine and Ross Bowen. His father worked for the National Roads and Motorists' Association, while his mother, who was born in the United Kingdom, was a childcare worker. Bowen grew up in the suburb of Smithfield. He began his education at Smithfield Public School, and later attended St Johns Park High School before going on to the University of Sydney, where he graduated with a Bachelor of Economics in 1994. One of his tutors was the future Greek finance minister Yanis Varoufakis.

== Political career ==
Bowen was elected to Fairfield City Council in 1995 and was Mayor of Fairfield in 1998 and 1999. He was elected president of the Western Sydney Regional Organisation of Councils (WSROC) in 1999 and served as president until 2001.

In 2004, Bowen was elected to the House of Representatives replacing Janice Crosio after she retired after 25 years in both state and federal politics. In 2006, Bowen was appointed to the Labor front bench as Shadow Assistant Treasurer and Shadow Minister for Revenue and Competition Policy.

=== Government minister (2007–2013) ===
==== First Rudd and Gillard ministries (2007–2010) ====
In December 2007, Prime Minister Kevin Rudd appointed him Assistant Treasurer and Minister for Competition Policy and Consumer Affairs. In June 2009 Bowen was promoted to cabinet as Minister for Financial Services, Superannuation and Corporate Law and Minister for Human Services.

In April 2010, Bowen announced significant reforms to the financial services sector including banning of commissions for financial planners giving advice on retail investment products including superannuation, managed investments and margin loans; instituting a statutory fiduciary duty so that financial advisers must act in the best interests of their clients, and increasing the powers of the corporate regulator; the Australian Securities and Investments Commission. The reforms were partially a response to the high-profile collapse of Storm Financial, Westpoint and Opes Prime and the resultant losses for retail investors, but also reflected global concerns with financial governance following the 2008 financial crisis. The reforms are due to be fully implemented on 1 July 2013.

==== Second Gillard ministry (2010–2013) ====
In September 2010, Bowen was appointed Minister for Immigration and Citizenship, succeeding Senator Chris Evans. On 2 February 2013, Bowen replaced Evans as Minister for Tertiary Education, Skills, Science and Research. Evans was also Minister for Small Business.

Chris Bowen resigned his ministerial portfolios on 22 March 2013 after he supported an unsuccessful attempt to reinstall Kevin Rudd as prime minister.

==== Second Rudd ministry (2013) ====
Following the June 2013 leadership spill, Bowen was reinstated as a Cabinet Minister and given the portfolio of Treasurer. He was sworn in on 27 June 2013. He was also given responsibility for financial services and superannuation, including carriage of the MySuper and other Simple Super reforms previously held by Bill Shorten.

=== Opposition (2013–2022) ===
Bowen was appointed Interim Leader of the Labor Party on 13 September 2013 following the resignation of Kevin Rudd in the wake of the party's defeat in the 2013 federal election. He pledged not to stand in the October 2013 leadership spill which was contested by Anthony Albanese and Bill Shorten. Shorten was elected as leader. Bowen was later appointed Shadow Treasurer by Bill Shorten.

After Labor's loss in the 2019 federal election, Shorten announced his pending resignation as leader of the party. Bowen was considered a frontrunner to succeed him. On 21 May, Bowen announced his candidacy in the leadership ballot, but withdrew the following day. He was subsequently replaced as Shadow Treasurer by Jim Chalmers, but remained on the frontbench as Shadow Minister for Health.

As Shadow Treasurer after his stint as Treasurer, he was shadow to his three immediate successors as Treasurer, Joe Hockey, Scott Morrison and Josh Frydenberg.

=== Government minister (2022–present) ===
Following the 2022 federal election, Bowen was appointed Minister for Climate Change and Energy in the Albanese ministry. As climate change minister, Bowen oversaw policy reforms to energy and industrial policy during the Albanese government. This included changes to the Safeguard Mechanism and Australian Carbon Credit Units, establishing the Rewiring the Nation Fund and the Capacity Investment Scheme to support investments in new renewable energy infrastructure. He also led the government's efforts to legislate a carbon reduction target of 43 percent on 2005 levels.

Bowen faced criticism in early 2024 for taking a private jet to a ministerial announcement about clean energy, while the Prime Minister also flew there in another private jet. It was reported that the flights were taken on advice from the RAAF.

Bowen was reappointed as climate change minister in the second Albanese ministry following the government's re-election in the 2025 federal election. In September 2025, he delivered Australia's first-ever climate change risk assessment, stating that the "cost of inaction will always outweigh the cost of action" with regards to climate policy.

Bowen at COP31 in Antalya

Minister Chris Bowen and Dr. Tan See Leng detailed in July 2026 cross-border electricity trade, LNG supply security, and carbon capture cooperation. "Both Ministers recognised the important role each country plays in the other’s energy security. Singapore is Australia’s largest supplier of refined petroleum products, while Australia is one of Singapore’s key suppliers of liquefied natural gas (LNG). Both Ministers also welcomed the growing breadth of bilateral cooperation in new areas, such as cross-border electricity trade, low-emissions technologies and carbon capture and storage," a joint statement said.

In late 2025, Bowen led Australia's bid alongside Pacific Island nations to host the 2026 United Nations Climate Change Conference (COP31). Following negotiations with competing host country Türkiye, Australia agreed to a dual arrangement where Türkiye hosted the summit in Antalya in November 2026 while Bowen served as COP31 President of Negotiations.

In September 2026, Bowen defended Liberal MP Andrew Hastie after claims were made in the satire series Pauline Hanson's Please Explain that he was a "traitor", calling him a "patriot" to Australia.

== Political positions ==
Bowen supports same-sex marriage. Notably in 2017, his Division of McMahon had the 3rd highest percentage of "No" responses in the Australian Marriage Law Postal Survey, with 64.9% of the electorate's respondents to the survey responding "No".

In April 2020, Bowen supported then Foreign Minister Marise Payne's call for an independent global inquiry into the origins of the COVID-19 pandemic including China's handling of the initial outbreak in Wuhan.

== Personal life ==
Bowen is married to Rebecca Mifsud, who as of 2016 worked for Toll Group as an industrial relations executive. They met at the 2000 ALP National Conference, where Mifsud was a delegate for the Electrical Trades Union. The couple have two children together and reside in Smithfield, within the locality of Smithfield West, where Bowen grew up.

Bowen's mother lost two baby boys when the family was still living in the United Kingdom - in 1959 and in 1960. Bowen revealed this story in order to raise awareness of the lasting negative effects of stillbirths on families.

Bowen possesses a Diploma of Modern Language (Bahasa Indonesia) from the University of New England.

Bowen supports the Greater Western Sydney Giants in the Australian Football League.

== See also ==
- Rudd government (2007–2010)
- Rudd government (2013)

== Bibliography ==
- Hearts and Minds: A Blueprint for Modern Labor (2013)
- The Money Men: Australia's Twelve Most Notable Treasurers (2015)
- On Charlatans (2021)

== Notes ==
Civic offices
Preceded by Anwar Khoshaba	Mayor of Fairfield; 1998–1999	Succeeded by Anwar Khoshaba
Parliament of Australia
Preceded by Janice Crosio	Member for Prospect; 2004–2010	Division abolished
New division	Member for McMahon; 2010–present	Incumbent
Political offices
Preceded by Joel Fitzgibbon	Shadow Assistant Treasurer; 2006–2007	Succeeded by Michael Keenan
Preceded by Joel Fitzgibbon as Shadow Minister for Revenue and Shadow Minister for Small Business and Competition	Shadow Minister for Revenue and Competition Policy; 2006–2007	Succeeded by Peter Dutton as Shadow Minister for Finance, Competition Policy and Deregulation
Preceded by Peter Dutton as Minister for Revenue and Assistant Treasurer	Assistant Treasurer of Australia; 2007–2009	Succeeded by Nick Sherry
Preceded by Joe Hockey as Minister for Financial Services and Regulation	Minister for Competition Policy and Consumer Affairs; 2007–2009	Succeeded by Craig Emerson
Preceded by Nick Sherry as Minister for Superannuation and Corporate Law	Minister for Financial Services, Superannuation and Corporate Law; 2009–2010	Succeeded by Bill Shorten as Minister for Financial Services and Superannuation
Preceded by Joe Ludwig	Minister for Human Services; 2009–2010	Succeeded by Tanya Plibersek
Preceded by Chris Evans	Minister for Immigration and Citizenship; 2010–2013	Succeeded by Brendan O'Connor
Preceded by Chris Evans	Minister for Tertiary Education, Skills, Science and Research; 2013	Succeeded by Craig Emerson
Preceded by Brendan O'Connor	Minister for Small Business; 2013	Succeeded by Gary Gray
Preceded by Wayne Swan	Treasurer of Australia; 2013	Succeeded by Joe Hockey
Preceded by Tony Abbott as Leader of the Opposition of Australia	Acting Leader of the Opposition of Australia; 2013	Succeeded by Bill Shorten as Leader of the Opposition of Australia
Preceded by Joe Hockey	Shadow Treasurer of Australia; 2013–2019	Succeeded by Jim Chalmers
Preceded by Katy Gallagher as Shadow Minister for Small Business and Financial Services	Acting Shadow Minister for Small Business and Financial Services; 2017–2018	Succeeded by Himself as Shadow Minister for Small Business
Preceded by Katy Gallagher as Shadow Minister for Small Business and Financial Services	Acting Shadow Minister for Small Business and Financial Services; 2017–2018	Succeeded by Clare O'Neil as Shadow Minister for Financial Services
Preceded by Himself as Acting Shadow Minister for Small Business and Financial Services	Shadow Minister for Small Business; 2018–2019	Succeeded by Richard Marles as Shadow Minister for National Reconstruction, Employment, Skills and Small Business
Preceded by Catherine King as Shadow Minister for Health and Medicare	Shadow Minister for Health; 2019–2021	Succeeded by Mark Butler as Shadow Minister for Health and Ageing
Preceded by Mark Butler	Shadow Minister for Climate Change and Energy; 2021–2022	Succeeded by Ted O'Brien
Preceded by Angus Taylor as Minister for Industry, Energy and Emissions Reduction	Minister for Climate Change and Energy; 2022–present	Incumbent
Party political offices
Preceded by Kevin Rudd as Leader of the Australian Labor Party	Acting Leader of the Australian Labor Party; 2013	Succeeded by Bill Shorten as Leader of the Australian Labor Party
