= Stephen Jones (Australian politician) =

Australian politician (born 1965)

The Honourable Stephen Jones
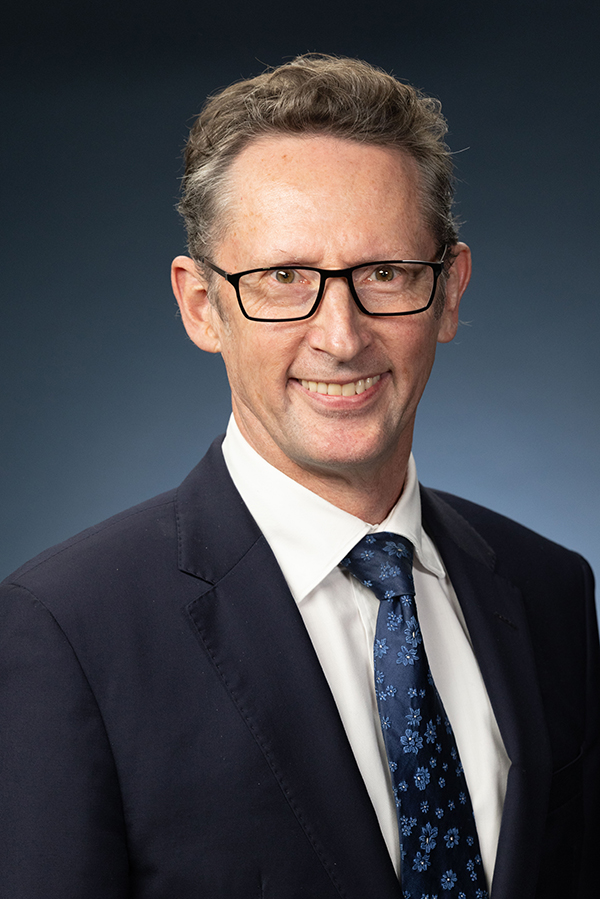
- Official portrait, 2025

Permanent Representative of Australia to the Organisation for Economic Co-operation and Development
- Incumbent
- Assumed office 11 September 2025
- Prime Minister: Anthony Albanese
- Preceded by: Brendan Pearson

Assistant Treasurer and Minister for Financial Services
- In office 1 June 2022 – 13 May 2025
- Prime Minister: Anthony Albanese
- Preceded by: Michael Sukkar (Assistant Treasurer); Jane Hume (Minister for Financial Services)
- Succeeded by: Daniel Mulino

Member of the Australian Parliament for Whitlam
- In office 2 July 2016 – 28 March 2025
- Preceded by: New seat
- Succeeded by: Carol Berry

Member of the Australian Parliament for Throsby
- In office 21 August 2010 – 2 July 2016
- Preceded by: Jennie George
- Succeeded by: Seat abolished

Personal details
- Born: 29 June 1965 (age 61) Wollongong, New South Wales, Australia
- Party: Labor
- Children: 2
- Education: University of Wollongong (BA), Macquarie University (LLB)
- Profession: Lawyer and union official
- Website: www.stephenjones.org.au

Stephen Patrick Jones (born 29 June 1965) is an Australian diplomat and former politician who represented the Division of Whitlam (formerly Throsby) for the Australian Labor Party from the 2010 Australian federal election until 2025. From 2022 to 2025, he served as Assistant Treasurer and Minister for Financial Services in the first Albanese ministry.

== Early years and background ==
Stephen Jones is one of five children (Maree, Luke, Adam and Amanda) who grew up in Wollongong, New South Wales. His father Mark, was a teacher at TAFE and his mother Margaret, worked as a School Assistant. Stephen is the father to two children.

Jones attended St Brigid's Primary School in Gwynneville, New South Wales and Edmund Rice College in Wollongong where he was School Captain and Dux. When allegations of historical sexual abuse at Edmund Rice College surfaced, Jones' father expressed regret in sending him and his brothers to the school.

He holds a Bachelor of Arts (History and Politics) from the University of Wollongong and a Bachelor of Laws from Macquarie University.

His early career was spent as a youth advocate in Campbelltown, New South Wales. Working primarily with children who had developmental disabilities and later, with adults suffering spinal cord injury.

Jones joined the Community and Public Sector Union (CPSU) in 1993. He worked in various roles, including NSW branch secretary and secretary of the Communications Division. He was seconded to the Australian Council of Trade Unions (ACTU) in 2004, where he worked to secure compensation for victims of James Hardie asbestos-related disease. Jones was elected as national secretary of the CPSU in 2005 and led the union's campaign against the Howard government's WorkChoices industrial laws in the lead up to the 2007 election.

== Political career ==
Jones gained preselection for the seat of Throsby in late 2009, following the resignation of former Member Jennie George. He was endorsed as the Labor candidate after the intervention of the Labor Party national executive and he gained the seat at the 2010 federal election.

Jones made his First Speech in the House of Representatives on 19 October 2010.

In the 43rd Parliament, Jones served as a member of the House of Representatives Standing Committee on Economics, the Standing Committee on Infrastructure and Communications. and the Joint Select Committee on Gambling Reform.

Jones faced a contested pre-selection battle to retain Throsby in 2013. In the long lead up to the pre-selection, a number of potential candidates from the opposing right wing faction of the ALP were floated including Mark Hay, the son of State MP for Wollongong, Noreen Hay and former State Member for Kiama, Matt Brown. When nominations were called in May 2013, after months of delay, the only challenger to contest the pre-selection was local nurse John Rumble, son of former State MP, Terry Rumble. Jones decisively won the rank and file pre-selection ballot held on 15 June 2013 by 90 votes to 47.

Jones was re-elected for a second term at the 2013 Australian federal election. On 18 October 2013, he was appointed shadow parliamentary secretary for Infrastructure and Regional Development. On 4 March 2014, Jones was promoted to Shadow Assistant Minister for Health after Melissa Parke stepped down due to personal and family reasons.

Jones was re-elected for a third term at the 2016 Australian federal election, after the division of Throsby had been renamed the division of Whitlam. He was re-elected at the 2022 election, becoming the Assistant Treasurer and Minister for Financial Services for the incoming Albanese government.

In January 2025, Jones announced he would not contest his seat at the 2025 federal election, ending a 15-year career in Australian politics.

While delivering his valedictory speech on 12 February 2025 in the House of Representatives, Jones alleged he was sexually abused as a child.

=== Political positions ===
As a co-convenor of Labor's left faction in the federal parliamentary Labor Party, Jones has spoken in the House of Representatives on a number of issues of importance to the progressive political agenda including same-sex marriage, asylum seekers, introducing a carbon price and other environmental issues.

==== Same-sex marriage ====
On 15 November 2010, in response to a motion concerning same-sex marriage moved by Adam Bandt, Federal Member for Melbourne (Australian Greens) in the House of Representative, Jones moved, as an amendment:

That all the words after “That” be omitted with a view to substituting the following words: “this House calls on all parliamentarians, consistent with their duties as representatives, to gauge their constituents’ views on ways to achieve equal treatment for same sex couples including marriage”

He articulated the political challenge:

If legislation is to be changed it will require consensus, which will require more votes than any single party can muster in this chamber. That will not be achieved by a heroic dash but by careful advocacy that respects different views, respectfully. On this issue there are different views. There are some who, on theological grounds, believe that to celebrate marriage of two men or two women is an affront to their religion. I have thought carefully about this objection, and I cannot help but draw the conclusion that the real objection here is not to the marriage but to the relationship.

The amended motion was supported by Labor and passed in the House of Representatives, the first such motion adopted in the lower house on same-sex marriage.

Following changes to the ALP National Platform in November 2011 to allow for marriage equality and a conscience vote for Labor MPs, Stephen Jones agreed to put forward a Private Member's Bill to give effect to ALP policy in the Australian Parliament. He introduced his bill to legalise same-sex marriage on 13 February 2012. The Bill was defeated in the House of Representatives on 19 September 2012.

==== Other issues ====
Jones has campaigned on a number of other issues as an MP, including restrictions on gambling ads during TV sports broadcasts, for local job seekers in the mining industry, the early rollout of the National Broadband Network to the region, Labor Party reform and renewal and Prime Minister Kevin Rudd's asylum seeker agreement with Papua New Guinea.

Parliament of Australia
Preceded by Jennie George	Member for Throsby; 2010–2016	Abolished
New seat	Member for Whitlam; 2016–2025	Succeeded by Carol Berry
