= Kelly O'Dwyer =

Australian politician (born 1977)

The Honourable Kelly O'Dwyer
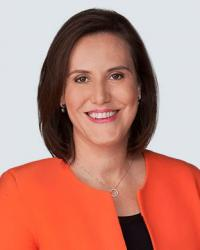
- Official portrait, 2017

Minister for Jobs and Industrial Relations
- In office 24 August 2018 – 11 April 2019
- Prime Minister: Scott Morrison
- Preceded by: Michaelia Cash
- Succeeded by: Christian Porter (Industrial Relations); Michaelia Cash (Jobs)

Minister for Women
- In office 20 December 2017 – 11 April 2019
- Prime Minister: Malcolm Turnbull; Scott Morrison
- Preceded by: Michaelia Cash
- Succeeded by: Marise Payne

Minister for Revenue and Financial Services
- In office 19 July 2016 – 24 August 2018
- Preceded by: Herself (as Assistant Treasurer)
- Succeeded by: Stuart Robert (as Assistant Treasurer)

Minister Assisting the Prime Minister for the Public Service
- In office 20 December 2017 – 24 August 2018
- Prime Minister: Malcolm Turnbull
- Preceded by: Michaelia Cash
- Succeeded by: Office abolished

Minister for Small Business
- In office 21 September 2015 – 19 July 2016
- Prime Minister: Malcolm Turnbull
- Preceded by: Bruce Billson
- Succeeded by: Michael McCormack

Assistant Treasurer
- In office 21 September 2015 – 19 July 2016
- Prime Minister: Malcolm Turnbull
- Preceded by: Josh Frydenberg
- Succeeded by: Herself (as Minister for Revenue and Financial Services)

Member of the Australian Parliament for Higgins
- In office 5 December 2009 – 11 April 2019
- Preceded by: Peter Costello
- Succeeded by: Katie Allen

Personal details
- Born: Kelly Megan O'Dwyer; 31 March 1977 (age 49) Melbourne, Victoria, Australia
- Party: Liberal
- Spouse: Jon Mant
- Children: 2
- Education: University of Melbourne
- Profession: Lawyer
- Website: Official website

Kelly Megan O'Dwyer (born 31 March 1977) is a former Australian politician. She served in the House of Representatives from 2009 to 2019, representing the Liberal Party, and held senior ministerial office from 2015 to 2019.

O'Dwyer was a solicitor, political adviser, and National Australia Bank (NAB) executive before entering politics. She was elected to parliament at the 2009 Higgins by-election, replacing Peter Costello. In 2014, she was made a parliamentary secretary in the Abbott government. O'Dwyer was promoted to cabinet when Malcolm Turnbull became prime minister in 2015. She served as Minister for Small Business (2015–2016), Assistant Treasurer (2015–2016), Minister for Revenue and Financial Services (2016–2018), and Minister for Women (2017–2019). In 2017, she became the first Australian cabinet minister to give birth while in office. O'Dwyer ended her political career as Minister for Jobs and Industrial Relations in the Morrison government, retiring prior to the 2019 federal election.

== Early career ==
O'Dwyer was born in Box Hill and was educated at Presbyterian Ladies' College and the University of Melbourne, where she graduated with a Bachelor of Arts and Bachelor of Laws. After working as a solicitor for Freehills in Melbourne, O'Dwyer spent four years as a senior advisor to Peter Costello, then the member for the federal division of Higgins and the Federal Treasurer, later becoming an executive at the National Australia Bank.

== Political career ==
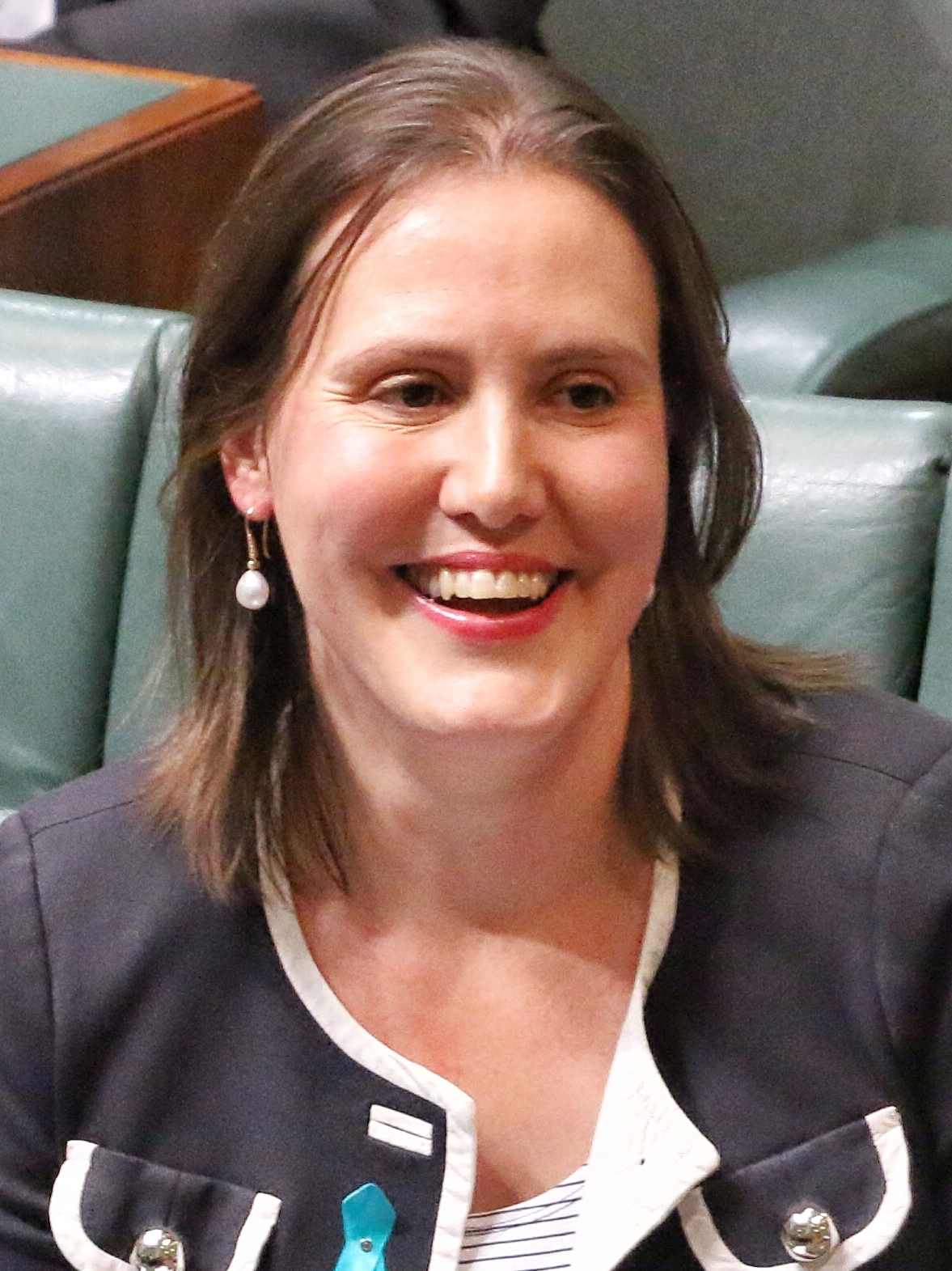
O'Dwyer in Parliament in 2016

=== Entry to federal politics ===
Costello decided in 2009 not to seek another term of office at the next federal election. On 17 September 2009, O'Dwyer was pre-selected to stand as the Liberal Party candidate for Higgins at the next election. Peter Costello then announced his resignation from Parliament in October 2009. He stated that he chose to retire ahead of the next federal election as a contribution to renewal of the Liberal Party and that O'Dwyer would contribute to this process. A by-election was held on 5 December 2009. O'Dwyer was considered a "shoo-in", especially since the Labor Party did not contest the seat.

In winning preselection, O'Dwyer became the first woman to win Liberal Party preselection for a safe seat in metropolitan Melbourne. During the preselection process federal Liberal politicians Sophie Mirabella, Fran Bailey and Helen Coonan claimed that there had been a sexist campaign against O'Dwyer's candidacy, with some preselectors being told that a "leadership seat" such as Higgins was unsuited to a woman and that being elected to a federal seat might endanger her marriage.

=== 2016 federal election ===
At the 2016 federal election, O'Dwyer was re-elected with a two-candidate preferred vote of 57.99% (a swing against her of 2%) and a 52.5% primary vote (a swing against her of 2.4%).

A Greens-funded Lonergan seat-level opinion poll conducted from a sample of 1,100 voters in Higgins took place a month out from the 2016 election on 3−4 June. It suggested the Liberal primary vote may have decreased substantially. However, the poll proved inaccurate, with O'Dwyer winning comfortably.

=== Minister ===
O'Dwyer had been serving as Parliamentary Secretary to the Treasurer in the Abbott government from December 2014, until the leadership spill of the Liberal Party occurred in September 2015. Malcolm Turnbull won the spill and was sworn in as Prime Minister on 15 September 2015. Turnbull introduced an overhaul of the cabinet, which saw O'Dwyer appointed to Cabinet as Minister for Small Business and Assistant Treasurer in the First Turnbull Ministry. Following the re-election of the Turnbull government in 2016, the O'Dwyer was appointed as the Minister for Revenue and Financial Services, a name change. O'Dwyer was assigned two additional responsibilities, as the Minister for Women and the Minister Assisting the Prime Minister for the Public Service, in December 2017. Following the commencement of the Morrison government, O'Dwyer became the Minister for Jobs and Industrial Relations, in addition to her ongoing role as Minister for Women.

In 2018, O'Dwyer was listed as one of BBC's 100 Women.

On 19 January 2019, O'Dwyer announced that she would not be contesting the upcoming election as her two children would be approaching primary school age and she wanted to give her and her husband the best opportunity for a third child.

== Personal life ==
O’Dwyer is married to Jon Mant, a business executive, and has two sisters and one brother. Her daughter was born in 2015.

In 2017, O'Dwyer gave birth to her second child, making her the first Cabinet Minister to give birth while in office.

In April 2022, O'Dwyer joined Barrenjoey Capital Partners as a non-executive director.

Parliament of Australia
Preceded by Peter Costello	Member for Higgins; 2009–2019	Succeeded by Katie Allen
Political offices
Preceded by Michaelia Cash	Minister for Jobs and Industrial Relations; 2018–2019	Succeeded by Christian Porter
Preceded by Josh Frydenberg	Minister for Revenue and Financial Services; 2015–2018	Succeeded by Stuart Robert as Assistant Treasurer
Preceded by Michaelia Cash	Minister for Women; 2017–2019	Succeeded by Marise Payne
Preceded by Michaelia Cash	Minister Assisting the Prime Minister for the Public Service; 2017–2019	Succeeded by Greg Hunt
Preceded by Bruce Billson	Minister for Small Business; 2015–2016	Succeeded by Michael McCormack
