= Electoral results for the Division of Bradfield =

Australian division election results

This is a list of electoral results for the Division of Bradfield in Australian federal elections from the electorate's creation in 1949 until the present.

== Members ==
Member	Party	Term
Billy Hughes	Liberal	1949–1952
Harry Turner	Liberal	1952–1974
David Connolly	Liberal	1974–1996
Brendan Nelson	Liberal	1996–2009
Paul Fletcher	Liberal	2009–2025
Nicolette Boele	Independent	2025–present

== Election results ==
=== Elections in the 2020s ===
==== 2025 ====
2025 Australian federal election: Bradfield
Party	Candidate	Votes	%	±%
Liberal	Gisele Kapterian	42,676	38.03	−5.63
Independent	Nicolette Boele	30,309	27.01	+10.95
Labor	Louise McCallum	22,768	20.29	+2.56
Greens	Harjit Singh	7,551	6.73	−1.89
Independent	Andy Yin	4,635	4.13	+4.13
One Nation	John Manton	1,725	1.54	+0.07
Libertarian	Samuel Gunning	1,376	1.23	+0.94
Trumpet of Patriots	Rosemary Mulligan	1,162	1.04	+1.04
Total formal votes		112,202	94.40	−1.69
Informal votes		6,656	5.60	+1.69
Turnout		118,858	93.69	+1.11
Notional two-party-preferred count
Liberal	Gisele Kapterian	61,658	54.95	−1.18
Labor	Louise McCallum	50,544	45.05	+1.18
Two-candidate-preferred result
Independent	Nicolette Boele	56,114	50.01	+3.41
Liberal	Gisele Kapterian	56,088	49.99	−3.41
Independent gain from Liberal		Swing	+3.41	

The AEC applied a mathematical equation to approximate the Two-Party Preferred (TPP) figure for Bradfield, as they were unable to conduct a 'scrutiny-for-information' count to get the TPP figure due to the potential for a petition to the Court of Disputed Returns regarding the Bradfield result. The Liberals launched then withdrew a court challenge to the result.

==== 2022 ====
2022 Australian federal election: Bradfield
Party	Candidate	Votes	%	±%
Liberal	Paul Fletcher	43,562	45.05	−15.28
Independent	Nicolette Boele	20,198	20.89	+20.89
Labor	David Brigden	16,902	17.48	−3.70
Greens	Martin Cousins	8,960	9.27	−4.44
Independent	Janine Kitson	3,018	3.12	+3.12
United Australia	Rob Fletcher	2,496	2.58	+0.74
One Nation	Michael Lowe	1,568	1.62	+1.62
Total formal votes		96,704	96.40	+0.45
Informal votes		3,616	3.60	−0.45
Turnout		100,320	92.43	−0.95
Notional two-party-preferred count
Liberal	Paul Fletcher	54,685	56.55	−10.01
Labor	David Brigden	42,019	43.45	+10.01
Two-candidate-preferred result
Liberal	Paul Fletcher	52,447	54.23	−12.33
Independent	Nicolette Boele	44,257	45.77	+45.77
Liberal hold				

Alluvial diagram for preference flows in the seat of Bradfield in the 2022 federal election. indicates at what stage the winning candidate had over 50% of the votes and was declared the winner.

=== Elections in the 2010s ===
==== 2019 ====
2019 Australian federal election: Bradfield
Party	Candidate	Votes	%	±%
Liberal	Paul Fletcher	58,007	60.33	−0.79
Labor	Chris Haviland	20,361	21.18	+4.17
Greens	Tony Adams	13,177	13.71	+2.03
Sustainable Australia	Stephen Molloy	2,826	2.94	+2.94
United Australia	Marcus Versace	1,772	1.84	+1.84
Total formal votes		96,143	95.95	−0.50
Informal votes		4,056	4.05	+0.50
Turnout		100,199	93.38	+1.50
Two-party-preferred result
Liberal	Paul Fletcher	63,997	66.56	−4.48
Labor	Chris Haviland	32,146	33.44	+4.48
Liberal hold		Swing	−4.48	

==== 2016 ====
2016 Australian federal election: Bradfield
Party	Candidate	Votes	%	±%
Liberal	Paul Fletcher	57,231	61.12	−3.96
Labor	Katie Gompertz	15,926	17.01	+0.42
Greens	Adrian Jones	10,936	11.68	−1.15
Independent	Christine Berman	4,248	4.54	+4.54
Christian Democrats	Chris Vale	3,497	3.73	+1.91
Liberty Alliance	Peter Kelly	1,796	1.92	+1.92
Total formal votes		93,634	96.45	+2.16
Informal votes		3,446	3.55	−2.16
Turnout		97,080	91.88	−3.41
Two-party-preferred result
Liberal	Paul Fletcher	66,513	71.04	+0.10
Labor	Katie Gompertz	27,121	28.96	−0.10
Liberal hold		Swing	+0.10	

==== 2013 ====
2013 Australian federal election: Bradfield
Party	Candidate	Votes	%	±%
Liberal	Paul Fletcher	57,506	64.84	+0.39
Labor	Chris Haviland	14,720	16.60	−2.62
Greens	Pippa McInnes	11,429	12.89	−3.45
Palmer United	Blake Buchanan	2,366	2.67	+2.67
Christian Democrats	John Archer	1,671	1.88	+1.88
Democratic Labour	Paul Harrold	992	1.12	+1.12
Total formal votes		88,684	94.26	−1.64
Informal votes		5,401	5.74	+1.64
Turnout		94,085	93.62	+0.22
Two-party-preferred result
Liberal	Paul Fletcher	62,771	70.78	+2.60
Labor	Chris Haviland	25,913	29.22	−2.60
Liberal hold		Swing	+2.60	

==== 2010 ====
2010 Australian federal election: Bradfield
Party	Candidate	Votes	%	±%
Liberal	Paul Fletcher	56,143	64.45	+5.06
Labor	Sarah Gallard	16,742	19.22	−6.95
Greens	Susie Gemmell	14,231	16.34	+5.28
Total formal votes		87,116	95.90	−0.13
Informal votes		3,722	4.10	+0.13
Turnout		90,838	93.41	−0.64
Two-party-preferred result
Liberal	Paul Fletcher	59,397	68.18	+4.32
Labor	Sarah Gallard	27,719	31.82	−4.32
Liberal hold		Swing	+4.32	

=== Elections in the 2000s ===
==== 2009 by-election ====
2009 Bradfield by-election
Party	Candidate	Votes	%	±%
Liberal	Paul Fletcher	39,815	56.44	−2.63
Greens	Susie Gemmell	17,799	25.23	+13.97
Sex Party	Marianne Leishman	2,229	3.16	+3.16
Democratic Labour	Simon McCaffrey	1,533	2.17	+2.17
Independent	Simon Kelly	1,359	1.93	+1.93
Independent Climate Sceptics	Bill Koutalianos	1,191	1.69	+1.69
Christian Democrats	James Whitehall	1,054	1.49	§
Nuclear Energy	Goronwy Price	758	1.07	+1.07
Climate Change	Deborah Burt	686	0.97	+0.97
Independent	Brian Buckley	618	0.88	+0.88
Liberal Democrats	Lucy Gabb	589	0.83	+0.83
Independent	Philip Dowling	555	0.79	+0.79
One Nation	Victor Waterson	449	0.64	+0.64
Independent	Peter Hanrahan	443	0.63	+0.63
Christian Democrats	Esther Heng	362	0.51	§
Christian Democrats	Andrew Hestelow	285	0.40	§
Christian Democrats	Leighton Thew	187	0.27	§
Christian Democrats	Jodi Luke	170	0.24	§
Christian Democrats	Robyn Peebles	162	0.23	§
Christian Democrats	Darryl Allen	147	0.21	§
Christian Democrats	David Pix	100	0.14	§
Christian Democrats	Joseph Pender	57	0.08	§
Total formal votes		70,548	91.00	−5.01
Informal votes		6,976	9.00	+5.01
Turnout		77,524	81.51	−12.52
Two-candidate-preferred result
Liberal	Paul Fletcher	45,725	64.81	+1.36
Greens	Susie Gemmell	24,823	35.19	+35.19
Liberal hold		Swing	N/A	

§ The combined Christian Democrats vote was 3.58 percent, an increase of 1.84 percentage points.

==== 2007 ====
2007 Australian federal election: Bradfield
Party	Candidate	Votes	%	±%
Liberal	Brendan Nelson	49,817	59.07	−3.41
Labor	Victoria Brookman	22,509	26.69	+5.11
Greens	Susie Gemmell	9,495	11.26	+0.01
Christian Democrats	Witold Wiszniewski	1,466	1.74	+1.45
Family First	James Turnbull	759	0.90	−0.88
Citizens Electoral Council	Robert H. Butler	285	0.34	+0.34
Total formal votes		84,331	96.01	+0.53
Informal votes		3,501	3.99	−0.53
Turnout		87,832	94.04	−0.55
Two-party-preferred result
Liberal	Brendan Nelson	53,512	63.45	−4.10
Labor	Victoria Brookman	30,819	36.55	+4.10
Liberal hold		Swing	−4.10	

==== 2004 ====
2004 Australian federal election: Bradfield
Party	Candidate	Votes	%	±%
Liberal	Brendan Nelson	51,356	63.58	−1.02
Labor	Neil Neelam	16,735	20.72	+1.71
Greens	Robert H Goodwill	9,249	11.45	+4.76
Democrats	Jeannette Tsoulos	1,971	2.44	−4.24
Family First	Sarah Montgomery	1,459	1.81	+1.81
Total formal votes		80,770	95.65	−0.59
Informal votes		3,675	4.35	+0.59
Turnout		84,445	93.81	−0.41
Two-party-preferred result
Liberal	Brendan Nelson	55,336	68.51	−2.65
Labor	Neil Neelam	25,434	31.49	+2.65
Liberal hold		Swing	−2.65	

==== 2001 ====
2001 Australian federal election: Bradfield
Party	Candidate	Votes	%	±%
Liberal	Brendan Nelson	52,628	64.60	+2.00
Labor	Kathie Blunt	15,489	19.01	−1.01
Greens	David Bell	5,451	6.69	+3.56
Democrats	Peter Byrne	5,443	6.68	−0.99
One Nation	John Webeck	1,247	1.53	−2.05
Christian Democrats	Witold Wiszniewski	1,204	1.48	−0.04
Total formal votes		81,462	96.24	−0.81
Informal votes		3,179	3.76	+0.81
Turnout		84,641	94.46	
Two-party-preferred result
Liberal	Brendan Nelson	57,969	71.16	−0.13
Labor	Kathie Blunt	23,493	28.84	+0.13
Liberal hold		Swing	−0.13	

=== Elections in the 1990s ===
==== 1998 ====
1998 Australian federal election: Bradfield
Party	Candidate	Votes	%	±%
Liberal	Brendan Nelson	47,725	64.37	−0.38
Labor	Nadesu Kailainathan	13,937	18.80	+2.99
Democrats	Carmel Morris	5,791	7.81	−1.46
One Nation	Robert Webeck	2,832	3.82	+3.82
Greens	Marc Allen	2,218	2.99	−0.47
Christian Democrats	Margaret Ratcliffe	1,228	1.66	−0.10
Natural Law	Alexandra Kiely	412	0.56	+0.27
Total formal votes		74,143	97.15	+0.08
Informal votes		2,175	2.85	−0.08
Turnout		76,318	94.61	−1.84
Two-party-preferred result
Liberal	Brendan Nelson	54,276	73.20	−2.56
Labor	Nadesu Kailainathan	19,867	26.80	+2.56
Liberal hold		Swing	−2.56	

==== 1996 ====
1996 Australian federal election: Bradfield
Party	Candidate	Votes	%	±%
Liberal	Brendan Nelson	48,260	64.75	−5.02
Labor	Alex Kemeny	11,779	15.80	−6.56
Democrats	Ann Barry	6,908	9.27	+2.99
Greens	Richard Wright	2,577	3.46	+3.46
AAFI	Len Watkins	2,571	3.45	+3.45
Call to Australia	Margaret Ratcliffe	1,307	1.75	+1.75
Independent	Patrick Gallagher	918	1.23	+1.23
Natural Law	Mark Toomey	216	0.29	−1.30
Total formal votes		74,536	97.07	−0.38
Informal votes		2,252	2.93	+0.38
Turnout		76,788	96.45	+0.20
Two-party-preferred result
Liberal	Brendan Nelson	55,986	75.77	+2.72
Labor	Alex Kemeny	17,908	24.23	−2.72
Liberal hold		Swing	−2.72	

==== 1993 ====
1993 Australian federal election: Bradfield
Party	Candidate	Votes	%	±%
Liberal	David Connolly	51,822	69.77	+6.56
Labor	Simon Jeans	16,610	22.36	+6.08
Democrats	Bob Springett	4,665	6.28	−6.03
Natural Law	Mark Courtney-Holland	1,180	1.59	+1.59
Total formal votes		74,277	97.45	−0.53
Informal votes		1,943	2.55	+0.53
Turnout		76,220	96.25	
Two-party-preferred result
Liberal	David Connolly	54,247	73.04	+0.45
Labor	Simon Jeans	20,020	26.96	−0.45
Liberal hold		Swing	+0.45	

==== 1990 ====
1990 Australian federal election: Bradfield
Party	Candidate	Votes	%	±%
Liberal	David Connolly	41,250	63.6	−8.0
Labor	Adam McCarthy	11,898	18.3	−1.1
Democrats	Henry Long	7,496	11.6	+2.6
Nuclear Disarmament	Giovanna Trenoweth	1,811	2.8	+2.8
Independent	Anthony Hardwick	1,483	2.3	+2.3
Independent	Alan Jacobs	957	1.5	+1.5
Total formal votes		64,895	97.9	
Informal votes		1,376	2.1	
Turnout		66,271	95.6	
Two-party-preferred result
Liberal	David Connolly	46,796	72.3	−3.8
Labor	Adam McCarthy	17,913	27.7	+3.8
Liberal hold		Swing	−3.8	

=== Elections in the 1980s ===
==== 1987 ====
1987 Australian federal election: Bradfield
Party	Candidate	Votes	%	±%
Liberal	David Connolly	45,630	71.6	+0.1
Labor	Michael Fry	12,359	19.4	−1.3
Democrats	Fiona Richardson	5,745	9.0	+1.2
Total formal votes		63,734	97.2	
Informal votes		1,864	2.8	
Turnout		65,598	94.1	
Two-party-preferred result
Liberal	David Connolly	48,495	76.1	+0.6
Labor	Michael Fry	15,236	23.9	−0.6
Liberal hold		Swing	+0.6	

==== 1984 ====
1984 Australian federal election: Bradfield
Party	Candidate	Votes	%	±%
Liberal	David Connolly	44,901	71.5	−2.9
Labor	Matthew Strassberg	12,991	20.7	+1.9
Democrats	Emma Veitch	4,864	7.8	+1.0
Total formal votes		62,756	96.5	
Informal votes		2,271	3.5	
Turnout		65,027	94.8	
Two-party-preferred result
Liberal	David Connolly	47,333	75.5	−1.6
Labor	Matthew Strassberg	15,401	24.5	+1.6
Liberal hold		Swing	−1.6	

==== 1983 ====
1983 Australian federal election: Bradfield
Party	Candidate	Votes	%	±%
Liberal	David Connolly	49,566	72.1	−3.0
Labor	Peter Donovan	14,535	21.1	+3.5
Democrats	Anthony Dunne	4,674	6.8	−0.5
Total formal votes		68,775	98.6	
Informal votes		988	1.4	
Turnout		69,763	95.8	
Two-party-preferred result
Liberal	David Connolly	51,367	74.69	−3.41
Labor	Peter Donovan	17,408	25.31	+3.41
Liberal hold		Swing	−3.41	

==== 1980 ====
1980 Australian federal election: Bradfield
Party	Candidate	Votes	%	±%
Liberal	David Connolly	51,354	75.1	+2.5
Labor	Keith McKeen	12,018	17.6	+3.4
Democrats	Ilse Robey	5,018	7.3	−3.6
Total formal votes		68,390	98.5	
Informal votes		1,042	1.5	
Turnout		69,432	94.9	
Two-party-preferred result
Liberal	David Connolly		78.1	−1.6
Labor	Keith McKeen		21.9	+1.6
Liberal hold		Swing	−1.6	

=== Elections in the 1970s ===
==== 1977 ====
1977 Australian federal election: Bradfield
Party	Candidate	Votes	%	±%
Liberal	David Connolly	49,052	72.6	−5.8
Labor	Pauline Kibble	9,578	14.2	−3.5
Democrats	Donald Marrable	7,378	10.9	+10.9
Progress	Christopher Brown	1,518	2.2	−1.7
Total formal votes		67,526	98.7	
Informal votes		913	1.3	
Turnout		68,439	95.2	
Two-party-preferred result
Liberal	David Connolly		79.7	−0.5
Labor	Pauline Kibble		20.3	+0.5
Liberal hold		Swing	−0.5	

==== 1975 ====
1975 Australian federal election: Bradfield
Party	Candidate	Votes	%	±%
Liberal	David Connolly	53,135	77.9	+5.6
Labor	John Carmody	12,374	18.2	−5.4
Workers	Christopher Brown	2,662	3.9	+3.9
Total formal votes		68,171	98.9	
Informal votes		730	1.1	
Turnout		68,901	96.4	
Two-party-preferred result
Liberal	David Connolly		80.2	+6.3
Labor	John Carmody		19.8	−6.3
Liberal hold		Swing	+6.3	

==== 1974 ====
1974 Australian federal election: Bradfield
Party	Candidate	Votes	%	±%
Liberal	David Connolly	47,142	72.3	+11.0
Labor	Bruce Abrahams	15,391	23.6	+0.9
Australia	Colvin Johnston	2,660	4.1	−4.1
Total formal votes		65,193	99.1	
Informal votes		619	0.9	
Turnout		65,812	95.1	
Two-party-preferred result
Liberal	David Connolly		73.9	+4.6
Labor	Bruce Abrahams		26.1	−4.6
Liberal hold		Swing	+4.6	

==== 1972 ====
1972 Australian federal election: Bradfield
Party	Candidate	Votes	%	±%
Liberal	Harry Turner	36,378	61.3	−1.7
Labor	John Pomeroy	13,458	22.7	−0.1
Australia	Mavis McMillan	4,876	8.2	+4.0
Democratic Labor	Allan Dwyer	2,412	4.1	−1.6
Independent	Helen Berrill	2,251	3.8	+3.8
Total formal votes		59,375	99.0	
Informal votes		607	1.0	
Turnout		59,982	95.3	
Two-party-preferred result
Liberal	Harry Turner		69.3	−2.1
Labor	John Pomeroy		30.7	+2.1
Liberal hold		Swing	−2.1	

=== Elections in the 1960s ===
==== 1969 ====
1969 Australian federal election: Bradfield
Party	Candidate	Votes	%	±%
Liberal	Harry Turner	34,184	63.0	−16.3
Labor	Keith Crook	12,364	22.8	+8.3
Democratic Labor	Anthony Felton	3,085	5.7	−0.5
Independent	Betty Loneragan	2,306	4.3	+4.3
Australia	Barbara Wilson	2,293	4.2	+4.2
Total formal votes		54,232	98.6	
Informal votes		755	1.4	
Turnout		54,987	95.4	
Two-party-preferred result
Liberal	Harry Turner		71.4	−12.9
Labor	Keith Crook		28.6	+12.9
Liberal hold		Swing	−12.9	

==== 1966 ====
1966 Australian federal election: Bradfield
Party	Candidate	Votes	%	±%
Liberal	Harry Turner	44,317	78.4	+0.4
Labor	William Bramwell	8,698	15.4	−0.6
Democratic Labor	Allan Dwyer	3,533	6.2	+0.2
Total formal votes		56,548	97.9	
Informal votes		1,191	2.1	
Turnout		57,739	95.0	
Two-party-preferred result
Liberal	Harry Turner		83.4	+1.4
Labor	William Bramwell		16.6	−1.4
Liberal hold		Swing	+1.4	

==== 1963 ====
1963 Australian federal election: Bradfield
Party	Candidate	Votes	%	±%
Liberal	Harry Turner	41,831	78.0	+6.6
Labor	Lawrence McCulloch	8,575	16.0	−4.8
Democratic Labor	Dominique Droulers	3,245	6.0	−1.8
Total formal votes		53,651	98.9	
Informal votes		601	1.1	
Turnout		54,252	95.0	
Two-party-preferred result
Liberal	Harry Turner		82.0	+5.2
Labor	Lawrence McCulloch		18.0	−5.2
Liberal hold		Swing	+5.2	

==== 1961 ====
1961 Australian federal election: Bradfield
Party	Candidate	Votes	%	±%
Liberal	Harry Turner	36,166	71.4	−4.3
Labor	Percy Staines	10,545	20.8	+4.6
Democratic Labor	Dominique Droulers	3,946	7.8	−0.3
Total formal votes		50,657	98.2	
Informal votes		946	1.8	
Turnout		51,603	95.3	
Two-party-preferred result
Liberal	Harry Turner		76.8	−4.6
Labor	Percy Staines		23.2	+4.6
Liberal hold		Swing	−4.6	

=== Elections in the 1950s ===
==== 1958 ====
1958 Australian federal election: Bradfield
Party	Candidate	Votes	%	±%
Liberal	Harry Turner	34,363	75.7	−24.3
Labor	Percy Staines	7,338	16.2	+16.2
Democratic Labor	Dominique Droulers	3,677	8.1	+8.1
Total formal votes		45,378	97.8	
Informal votes		1,035	2.2	
Turnout		46,413	95.6	
Two-party-preferred result
Liberal	Harry Turner		81.4	−18.6
Labor	Percy Staines		18.6	+18.6
Liberal hold		Swing	−18.6	

==== 1955 ====
1955 Australian federal election: Bradfield
Party	Candidate	Votes	%	±%
Liberal	Harry Turner	unopposed		
Liberal hold		Swing		

==== 1954 ====
1954 Australian federal election: Bradfield
Party	Candidate	Votes	%	±%
Liberal	Harry Turner	unopposed		
Liberal hold		Swing		

==== 1952 by-election ====
1952 Bradfield by-election
Party	Candidate	Votes	%	±%
Liberal	Harry Turner	22,912	57.0	−21.7
Independent	Martin Hardie	15,336	38.2	+38.2
Independent Labor	John Smith	1,070	2.7	+2.7
Independent	Colin Potts	569	1.4	+1.4
Independent	Edward Wright	225	0.6	+0.6
Independent	Samuel Simons	84	0.2	+0.2
Total formal votes		40,196	98.1	
Informal votes		784	1.9	
Turnout		40,980	90.2	
Two-party-preferred result
Liberal	Harry Turner		58.4	−20.3
Independent	Martin Hardie		41.6	+41.6
Liberal hold		Swing	−20.3	

==== 1951 ====
1951 Australian federal election: Bradfield
Party	Candidate	Votes	%	±%
Liberal	Billy Hughes	32,469	78.7	+7.3
Labor	Hugh Milne	8,784	21.3	−0.4
Total formal votes		41,253	98.2	
Informal votes		762	1.8	
Turnout		42,015	95.8	
Liberal hold		Swing	+3.8	

=== Elections in the 1940s ===
==== 1949 ====
1949 Australian federal election: Bradfield
Party	Candidate	Votes	%	±%
Liberal	Billy Hughes	28,428	71.4	−3.8
Labor	Ken Gee	8,645	21.7	−3.0
Independent	Edward Price	2,764	6.9	+6.9
Total formal votes		39,837	98.2	
Informal votes		722	1.8	
Turnout		40,559	95.8	
Two-party-preferred result
Liberal	Billy Hughes		74.9	−0.3
Labor	Ken Gee		25.1	+0.3
Liberal notional hold		Swing	−0.3	
