= Members of the Australian House of Representatives, 2007–2010 =

This is a list of members of the Australian House of Representatives of the 42nd Parliament of Australia (2007–2010), as elected at the 2007 federal election.

There were a total of 150 members. Since the 2007 federal election, and subsequent by-elections and defections, the Labor Party had 83 members and formed the government. The opposition Coalition had a total of 63 members; 54 of whom were Liberal members and nine of which were National members (down one Liberal and one National since the election). In addition, there were four Independents (up from two at the election).

== Members ==
Member	Party	Electorate	State	In office
Tony Abbott	Liberal	Warringah	NSW	1994–2019
Dick Adams	Labor	Lyons	Tas	1993–2013
Anthony Albanese	Labor	Grayndler	NSW	1996–present
Kevin Andrews	Liberal	Menzies	Vic	1991–2022
Fran Bailey	Liberal	McEwen	Vic	1990–1993, 1996–2010
Bob Baldwin	Liberal	Paterson	NSW	1996–1998, 2001–2016
Arch Bevis	Labor	Brisbane	Qld	1990–2010
James Bidgood	Labor	Dawson	Qld	2007–2010
Bruce Billson	Liberal	Dunkley	Vic	1996–2016
Sharon Bird	Labor	Cunningham	NSW	2004–2022
Bronwyn Bishop	Liberal	Mackellar	NSW	1994–2016
Julie Bishop	Liberal	Curtin	WA	1998–2019
Chris Bowen	Labor	Prospect	NSW	2004–present
David Bradbury	Labor	Lindsay	NSW	2007–2013
Jamie Briggs^{[2]}	Liberal	Mayo	SA	2008–2016
Russell Broadbent	Liberal	McMillan	Vic	1990–1993, 1996–1998; 2004–2025
Anna Burke	Labor	Chisholm	Vic	1998–2016
Tony Burke	Labor	Watson	NSW	2004–present
Mark Butler	Labor	Port Adelaide	SA	2007–present
Anthony Byrne	Labor	Holt	Vic	1999–2022
Jodie Campbell	Labor	Bass	Tas	2007–2010
Nick Champion	Labor	Wakefield	SA	2007–2022
Darren Cheeseman	Labor	Corangamite	Vic	2007–2013
Darren Chester^{[1]}	National	Gippsland	Vic	2008–present
Steven Ciobo	Liberal	Moncrieff	Qld	2001–2019
Jason Clare	Labor	Blaxland	NSW	2007–present
John Cobb	National	Calare	NSW	2001–2016
Julie Collins	Labor	Franklin	Tas	2007–present
Greg Combet	Labor	Charlton	NSW	2007–2013
Peter Costello	Liberal	Higgins	Vic	1990–2009
Mark Coulton	National	Parkes	NSW	2007–2025
Simon Crean	Labor	Hotham	Vic	1990–2013
Michael Danby	Labor	Melbourne Ports	Vic	1998–2019
Yvette D'Ath	Labor	Petrie	Qld	2007–2013
Bob Debus	Labor	Macquarie	NSW	2007–2010
Alexander Downer^{[2]}	Liberal	Mayo	SA	1984–2008
Mark Dreyfus	Labor	Isaacs	Vic	2007–present
Peter Dutton	Liberal	Dickson	Qld	2001–2025
Justine Elliot	Labor	Richmond	NSW	2004–present
Annette Ellis	Labor	Canberra	ACT	1996–2010
Kate Ellis	Labor	Adelaide	SA	2004–2019
Craig Emerson	Labor	Rankin	Qld	1998–2013
Pat Farmer	Liberal	Macarthur	NSW	2001–2010
Laurie Ferguson	Labor	Reid	NSW	1990–2016
Martin Ferguson	Labor	Batman	Vic	1996–2013
Joel Fitzgibbon	Labor	Hunter	NSW	1996–2022
Paul Fletcher^{[4]}	Liberal	Bradfield	NSW	2009–2025
John Forrest	National	Mallee	Vic	1993–2013
Peter Garrett	Labor	Kingsford Smith	NSW	2004–2013
Joanna Gash	Liberal	Gilmore	NSW	1996–2013
Steve Georganas	Labor	Hindmarsh	SA	2004–2013, 2016–present
Jennie George	Labor	Throsby	NSW	2001–2010
Petro Georgiou	Liberal	Kooyong	Vic	1994–2010
Steve Gibbons	Labor	Bendigo	Vic	1998–2013
Julia Gillard	Labor	Lalor	Vic	1998–2013
Gary Gray	Labor	Brand	WA	2007–2016
Sharon Grierson	Labor	Newcastle	NSW	2001–2013
Alan Griffin	Labor	Bruce	Vic	1993–2016
Barry Haase	Liberal	Kalgoorlie	WA	1998–2013
Damian Hale	Labor	Solomon	NT	2007–2010
Jill Hall	Labor	Shortland	NSW	1998–2016
Luke Hartsuyker	National	Cowper	NSW	2001–2019
Alex Hawke	Liberal	Mitchell	NSW	2007–present
David Hawker	Liberal	Wannon	Vic	1983–2010
Chris Hayes	Labor	Werriwa	NSW	2005–2022
Joe Hockey	Liberal	North Sydney	NSW	1996–2015
Kay Hull	National	Riverina	NSW	1998–2010
Greg Hunt	Liberal	Flinders	Vic	2001–2022
Steve Irons	Liberal	Swan	WA	2007–2022
Julia Irwin	Labor	Fowler	NSW	1998–2010
Sharryn Jackson	Labor	Hasluck	WA	2001–2004, 2007–2010
Harry Jenkins	Labor	Scullin	Vic	1986–2013
Dennis Jensen	Liberal	Tangney	WA	2004–2016
Michael Johnson	Liberal/Independent^{[6]}	Ryan	Qld	2001–2010
Bob Katter	Independent	Kennedy	Qld	1993–present
Michael Keenan	Liberal	Stirling	WA	2004–2019
Mike Kelly	Labor	Eden-Monaro	NSW	2007–2013, 2016–2020
Duncan Kerr	Labor	Denison	Tas	1987–2010
Catherine King	Labor	Ballarat	Vic	2001–present
Andrew Laming	Liberal	Bowman	Qld	2004–2022
Sussan Ley	Liberal	Farrer	NSW	2001–2026
Peter Lindsay	Liberal	Herbert	Qld	1996–2010
Kirsten Livermore	Labor	Capricornia	Qld	1998–2013
Robert McClelland	Labor	Barton	NSW	1996–2013
Ian Macfarlane	Liberal	Groom	Qld	1998–2016
Peter McGauran^{[1]}	National	Gippsland	Vic	1983–2008
Maxine McKew	Labor	Bennelong	NSW	2007–2010
Bob McMullan	Labor	Fraser	ACT	1996–2010
Jenny Macklin	Labor	Jagajaga	Vic	1996–2019
Nola Marino	Liberal	Forrest	WA	2007–2025
Louise Markus	Liberal	Greenway	NSW	2004–2016
Richard Marles	Labor	Corio	Vic	2007–present
Margaret May	Liberal	McPherson	Qld	1998–2010
Daryl Melham	Labor	Banks	NSW	1990–2013
Sophie Mirabella	Liberal	Indi	Vic	2001–2013
Scott Morrison	Liberal	Cook	NSW	2007–2024
Judi Moylan	Liberal	Pearce	WA	1993–2013
John Murphy	Labor	Lowe	NSW	1998–2013
Belinda Neal	Labor	Robertson	NSW	2007–2010
Brendan Nelson	Liberal	Bradfield	NSW	1996–2009
Shayne Neumann	Labor	Blair	Qld	2007–present
Paul Neville	National	Hinkler	Qld	1993–2013
Brendan O'Connor	Labor	Gorton	Vic	2001–2025
Kelly O'Dwyer^{[5]}	Liberal	Higgins	Vic	2009–2019
Rob Oakeshott^{[3]}	Independent	Lyne	NSW	2008–2013
Julie Owens	Labor	Parramatta	NSW	2004–2022
Melissa Parke	Labor	Fremantle	WA	2007–2016
Chris Pearce	Liberal	Aston	Vic	2001–2010
Graham Perrett	Labor	Moreton	Qld	2007–2025
Tanya Plibersek	Labor	Sydney	NSW	1998–present
Roger Price	Labor	Chifley	NSW	1984–2010
Christopher Pyne	Liberal	Sturt	SA	1993–2019
Brett Raguse	Labor	Forde	Qld	2007–2010
Rowan Ramsey	Liberal	Grey	SA	2007–2025
Don Randall	Liberal	Canning	WA	1996–1998, 2001–2015
Kerry Rea	Labor	Bonner	Qld	2007–2010
Bernie Ripoll	Labor	Oxley	Qld	1998–2016
Amanda Rishworth	Labor	Kingston	SA	2007–present
Andrew Robb	Liberal	Goldstein	Vic	2004–2016
Stuart Robert	Liberal	Fadden	Qld	2007–2023
Nicola Roxon	Labor	Gellibrand	Vic	1998–2013
Kevin Rudd	Labor	Griffith	Qld	1998–2013
Philip Ruddock	Liberal	Berowra	NSW	1973–2016
Janelle Saffin	Labor	Page	NSW	2007–2013
Alby Schultz	Liberal	Hume	NSW	1998–2013
Bruce Scott	National	Maranoa	Qld	1990–2016
Patrick Secker	Liberal	Barker	SA	1998–2013
Bill Shorten	Labor	Maribyrnong	Vic	2007–2025
Sid Sidebottom	Labor	Braddon	Tas	1998–2004, 2007–2013
Luke Simpkins	Liberal	Cowan	WA	2007–2016
Peter Slipper	Liberal	Fisher	Qld	1984–1987, 1993–2013
Stephen Smith	Labor	Perth	WA	1993–2013
Tony Smith	Liberal	Casey	Vic	2001–2022
Warren Snowdon	Labor	Lingiari	NT	1987–1996, 1998–2022
Alex Somlyay	Liberal	Fairfax	Qld	1990–2013
Andrew Southcott	Liberal	Boothby	SA	1996–2016
Sharman Stone	Liberal	Murray	Vic	1996–2016
Jon Sullivan	Labor	Longman	Qld	2007–2010
Wayne Swan	Labor	Lilley	Qld	1993–1996, 1998–2019
Mike Symon	Labor	Deakin	Vic	2007–2013
Lindsay Tanner	Labor	Melbourne	Vic	1993–2010
Craig Thomson	Labor	Dobell	NSW	2007–2013
Kelvin Thomson	Labor	Wills	Vic	1996–2016
Chris Trevor	Labor	Flynn	Qld	2007–2010
Warren Truss	National	Wide Bay	Qld	1990–2016
Wilson Tuckey	Liberal	O'Connor	WA	1980–2010
Malcolm Turnbull	Liberal	Wentworth	NSW	2004–2018
Jim Turnour	Labor	Leichhardt	Qld	2007–2010
Mark Vaile^{[3]}	National	Lyne	NSW	1993–2008
Danna Vale	Liberal	Hughes	NSW	1996–2010
Maria Vamvakinou	Labor	Calwell	Vic	2001–2025
Mal Washer	Liberal	Moore	WA	1998–2013
Tony Windsor	Independent	New England	NSW	2001–2013
Jason Wood	Liberal	La Trobe	Vic	2004–2010, 2013–present
Tony Zappia	Labor	Makin	SA	2007–present

== Leadership ==
=== Presiding officer ===
Office	Party	Officer	Electorate	State	Term of office
Speaker of the House	Labor	Harry Jenkins Jr.	Scullin	Vic	12 February 2008–24 November 2011

=== Majority leadership (Labor) ===
Office	Officer	Electorate	State	Term of office
Leader of the House	Anthony Albanese	Grayndler	NSW	12 February 2008–5 August 2013
Chief Whip	Roger Price	Chifley	NSW	22 October 2004–27 September 2010
Whip	Chris Hayes	Fowler	NSW	3 December 2007–5 July 2011
Whip	Jill Hall	Shortland	NSW	22 October 2004–27 November 2012
Deputy Speaker	Anna Burke	Chisholm	Vic	12 February 2008–19 July 2010
Second Deputy Speaker				
Chair, Economic Caucus Committee	Craig Emerson	Rankin	Qld	
Deputy Chair, Economic Caucus Committee	Sharon Grierson	Newcastle	NSW	
Chair, National Security Caucus Committee				
Deputy Chair, National Security Caucus Committee	Brendan O'Connor	Gorton	Vic	
Chair, Regional Caucus Committee	Dick Adams	Lyons	Tas	
Deputy Chair, Regional Caucus Committee	Justine Elliot	Richmond	NSW	
Chair, Social Policy Caucus Committee	Jill Hall	Shortland	NSW	
Deputy Chair, Social Policy Caucus Committee	Annette Ellis	Canberra	ACT	
Chair, Women's Caucus Committee				
Deputy Chair, Women's Caucus Committee				

=== Minority leadership (Liberal-National) ===
Office	Officer	Electorate	State	Term of office
Opposition Leader of the House	Joe Hockey	North Sydney	NSW	2 December 2007-16 February 2009
Deputy Leader of the Opposition	Julie Bishop	Curtin	WA	3 December 2007-18 September 2013
Chief Opposition Whip in the House	Alex Somlyay	Fairfax	Qld	12 February 2008-14 September 2010
Whip	Nola Marino	Forrest	WA	12 February 2008-12 October 2015
Whip	Michael Johnson	Ryan	Qld	12 February 2008-26 February 2010

^{1} The National MP for Gippsland, Peter McGauran resigned on 4 April 2008; National candidate Darren Chester won the resulting by-election on 28 June.
^{2} The Liberal MP for Mayo, Alexander Downer, resigned on 14 July 2008. Liberal candidate Jamie Briggs was elected at the resulting by-election on 6 September.
^{3} The National MP for Lyne, Mark Vaile, resigned on 19 July 2008. Independent candidate and outgoing NSW state MP for Port Macquarie, Rob Oakeshott, won the resulting by-election on 6 September.
^{4} The Liberal MP for Bradfield, Brendan Nelson, resigned on 19 October 2009. Liberal candidate Paul Fletcher was elected the resulting by-election on 5 December 2009.
^{5} The Liberal MP for Higgins, Peter Costello, resigned on 19 October 2009. Liberal candidate Kelly O'Dwyer was elected at the resulting by-election on 5 December 2009.
^{6} The MP for Ryan, Michael Johnson, was expelled from the Liberal Party on 20 May 2010.

== See also ==
- Results of the 2007 Australian federal election (House of Representatives)
