= 2009 Bradfield by-election =

Australian parliamentary by-election

- 5 December 2009

Division of Bradfield
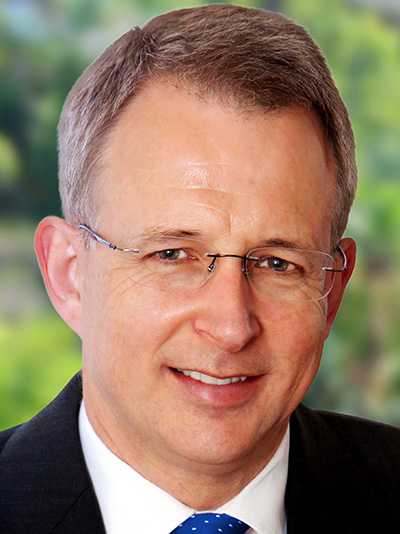

	First party	Second party
Candidate	Paul Fletcher	Susie Gemmell
Party	Liberal	Greens
Popular vote	39,815	17,799
Percentage	56.44%	25.23%
Swing	▼2.63	▲13.97
TPP	64.81%	35.19%
TPP swing	▲1.36	▲35.19
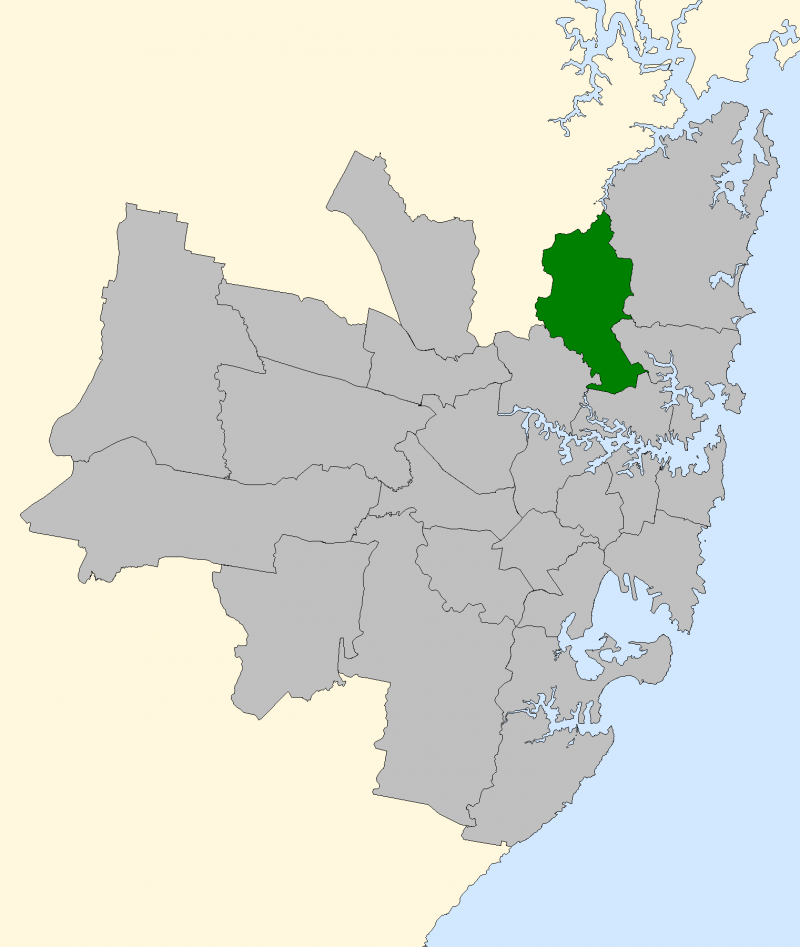
- Location of Bradfield within metropolitan Sydney
MP before election
Brendan Nelson
Liberal
Elected MP
Paul Fletcher
Liberal

The 2009 Bradfield by-election was held for the Australian House of Representatives seat of Bradfield on 5 December 2009. This was triggered as a result of the resignation of former minister and former Liberal Party leader Brendan Nelson. The by-election was held on the same day as the Higgins by-election.

The by-election was contested on the same boundaries drawn for Bradfield at the 2007 federal election. At that election, the Liberal Party won the seat over the Labor Party with a 63.45 per cent of the vote on a two-party-preferred basis, making it the safest metropolitan seat in Australia for the Liberals. At the time, the 2007 result was the second-closest in the seat's 60-year history (after the 1952 Bradfield by-election against an independent). The Liberal candidate had never needed to go to preferences to win the seat.

The writ for the by-election was issued on 30 October, with the rolls closing on 9 November. Candidate nominations closed on 12 November, and were announced the following day. At 22 candidates, it ties with the 1992 Wills by-election for the most candidates to contest a federal lower house seat.

Both the Bradfield and Higgins by-elections were the last by-elections for the House of Representatives until the Griffith by-election held in February 2014.

== Background ==
At the 2007 federal election, the opposition Kevin Rudd-led Labor Party defeated the incumbent John Howard-led Liberal-National coalition government. This marked the first change of government in over 11 years. Brendan Nelson had served in ministerial positions in the Howard government, before taking over the Liberal leadership from Howard after the election loss. He lost the leadership to Malcolm Turnbull less than a year later after sustained poor polling.

Nelson first won the seat of Bradfield at the 1996 election.

Nelson had initially indicated (16 February 2009) he would stay as the member until the next election, at which time he would retire from parliament. On 25 August 2009, however, he announced he would be resigning by late September, thus triggering a by-election. On 16 September 2009, he was appointed as Ambassador to the European Union, NATO, Belgium and Luxembourg. He officially resigned from the House on 19 October 2009.

== Campaign ==
The Higgins and Bradfield by-election campaigns were overshadowed by Liberal infighting over Labor's Carbon Pollution Reduction Scheme, culminating in the replacement of Malcolm Turnbull with Tony Abbott as Liberal leader. Although fairly safe on paper, some commentators including Malcolm Mackerras tipped the Greens to win in Higgins, and force the Liberals to preferences in Bradfield.

== Candidates ==
The following table is the order and party affiliation of each candidate who has nominated to contest the seat of Bradfield on 5 December 2009.

Ballot Number	Party	Candidate	Profession	Notes
1	Christian Democrats	James Whitehall	Property development	
2	Christian Democrats	Jodi Luke	Teacher	
3	Independent	Peter Hanrahan	Pensioner	
4	Independent	Bill Koutalianos	Architecture graduate	Endorsed by the unregistered Climate Sceptics Party
5	Democratic Labor	Simon McCaffrey	Obstetrician and gynaecologist	
6	Christian Democrats	Robyn Peebles	Religious minister	
7	Greens	Susie Gemmell	Parliamentary Advisor	Greens candidate for Bradfield at the 2007 federal election.
8	Christian Democrats	Darryl Allen	Retiree	
9	Christian Democrats	Leighton Thew	Engineer	
10	Sex	Marianne Leishman	Entertainer and law graduate	
11	Independent	Philip Dowling	Education officer	
12	Independent	Simon Kelly	IT businessman	
13	One Nation	Victor Waterson	Fitter and Turner	
14	Liberal Democrats	Lucy Gabb	Search marketer	
15	Independent	Brian Buckley		"Australian nationalist", a republican, anti-immigration and pro-refugee.
16	Liberal	Paul Fletcher	Former Optus executive	
17	Christian Democrats	Andrew Hestelow	Company director	
18	Christian Democrats	Esther Heng	Secretary	
19	Christian Democrats	Joseph Pender	Student	
20	Christian Democrats	David Pix	Graphics teacher	
21	Climate Change Coalition	Deborah Burt	Consultant	
22	Environmentalists for Nuclear Energy	Goronwy Price	Director	

The Australian Labor Party did not stand a candidate. The Christian Democrats suggested that they were considering running up to eleven candidates (eleven being the number of faithful disciples). The CDP ended up fielding nine candidates.

== Results ==
The Liberal Party retained the seat.

2009 Bradfield by-election
Party	Candidate	Votes	%	±%
Liberal	Paul Fletcher	39,815	56.44	−2.63
Greens	Susie Gemmell	17,799	25.23	+13.97
Sex Party	Marianne Leishman	2,229	3.16	+3.16
Democratic Labour	Simon McCaffrey	1,533	2.17	+2.17
Independent	Simon Kelly	1,359	1.93	+1.93
Ind. Climate Sceptics	Bill Koutalianos	1,191	1.69	+1.69
Christian Democrats	James Whitehall	1,054	1.49	§
Nuclear Energy	Goronwy Price	758	1.07	+1.07
Climate Change	Deborah Burt	686	0.97	+0.97
Independent	Brian Buckley	618	0.88	+0.88
Liberal Democrats	Lucy Gabb	589	0.83	+0.83
Independent	Philip Dowling	555	0.79	+0.79
One Nation	Victor Waterson	449	0.64	+0.64
Independent	Peter Hanrahan	443	0.63	+0.63
Christian Democrats	Esther Heng	362	0.51	§
Christian Democrats	Andrew Hestelow	285	0.40	§
Christian Democrats	Leighton Thew	187	0.27	§
Christian Democrats	Jodi Luke	170	0.24	§
Christian Democrats	Robyn Peebles	162	0.23	§
Christian Democrats	Darryl Allen	147	0.21	§
Christian Democrats	David Pix	100	0.14	§
Christian Democrats	Joseph Pender	57	0.08	§
Total formal votes		70,548	91.00	−5.01
Informal votes		6,976	9.00	+5.01
Turnout		77,524	81.51	−12.52
Two-candidate-preferred result
Liberal	Paul Fletcher	45,725	64.81	+1.36
Greens	Susie Gemmell	24,823	35.19	+35.19
Liberal hold		Swing	N/A	

§ The combined Christian Democrats vote was 3.58 percent, an increase of 1.84 percentage points.

== Aftermath ==
The Christian Democratic Party's lead candidate, James Whitehall, resigned from the party soon after the by-election on strong disagreement with the content of a controversial and unauthorised survey circulated by the campaign director Michael Darby. The platform of the CDP for the by-election was focused on the controversial Emissions Trading Scheme, which was supported by both the Liberal and Labor parties at the time of the by-election. Changes to the CDP platform, as suggested by the controversial survey, had not been sighted or approved by many of its candidates. Whitehall's father, the party's junior deputy president, also resigned. Being the author of the survey, which included questions on whether the Government should be able to deport Muslims, and whether mosques and Islamic schools should be banned, Darby faced expulsion from the party. He was ultimately relieved of his position, and party leader, Fred Nile, offered an apology for the survey, also stating that the CDP would not run multiple candidates in any electorates in future.

== See also ==
- List of Australian federal by-elections
- 1952 Bradfield by-election
