= 2009 Higgins by-election =

- 5 December 2009

Division of Higgins
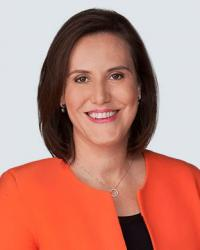

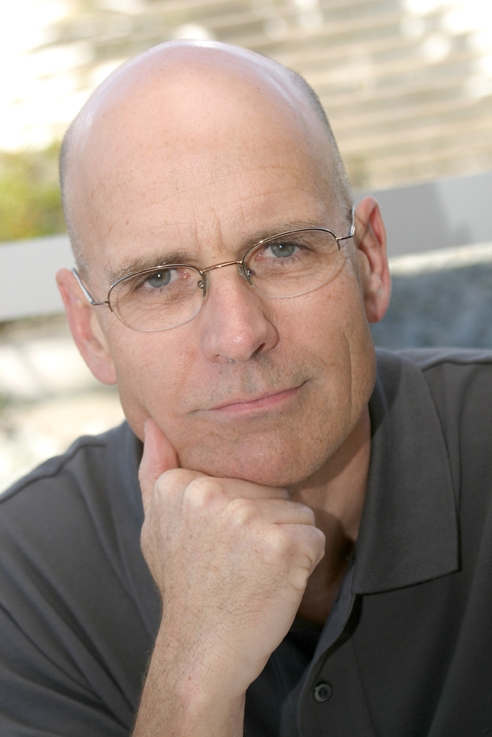
| | First party | Second party |
|---|---|---|
| Candidate | Kelly O'Dwyer | Clive Hamilton |
| Party | Liberal | Greens |
| Popular vote | 36,421 | 21,628 |
| Percentage | 54.6% | 32.4% |
| Swing | ▲0.96pp | ▲21.65pp |
| TPP | 60.23% | 39.77% |
| TPP swing | ▲3.19pp | ▲39.77pp |
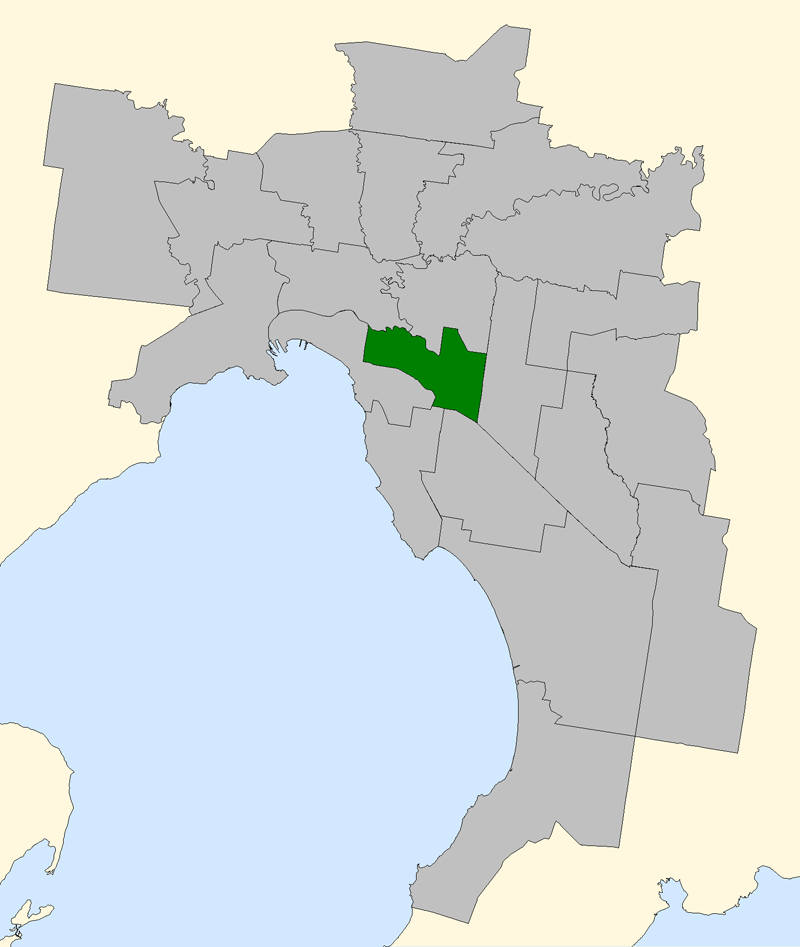
- Location of Higgins within metropolitan Melbourne
MP before election
Peter Costello
Liberal
Elected MP
Kelly O'Dwyer
Liberal

The 2009 Higgins by-election was held for the Australian House of Representatives Division of Higgins on 5 December 2009. This was triggered by the resignation of former treasurer and former Liberal Party deputy leader Peter Costello. The by-election was held on the same day as the Bradfield by-election.

It was contested on the same boundaries drawn for Higgins at the 2007 federal election. At that election, the Liberal Party won the seat over the Labor Party with 57.04 per cent of the vote on a two-party-preferred basis, the closest result in the seat's 60-year history. The Liberal candidate has never had to go to preferences to win the seat.

The writ for the by-election was issued on 30 October, with the rolls closing on 9 November. Candidate nominations closed 12 November, and were announced the following day. The Labor Party did not nominate a candidate.

Both the Higgins and Bradfield by-elections were the last by-elections for the House of Representatives until the 2014 Griffith by-election.

== Background ==
Costello first won the seat of Higgins at the 1990 federal election, and retained the seat in the six subsequent elections. At the 2007 federal election, the opposition Kevin Rudd-led Labor Party defeated the incumbent John Howard-led Liberal-National coalition government. This marked the first change of government in over 11 years. Costello was deputy Liberal leader since 1994, firstly under Alexander Downer and then under John Howard, and was treasurer in the Howard government from its formation in 1996. On the defeat of the Howard government in 2007, Costello declined to become Liberal leader and a position in the shadow ministry and returned to the backbenches. Costello had initially indicated (15 June 2009) he would stay as the member until the next election, at which time he would retire from parliament. However, on 7 October 2009, Costello announced he would be resigning from Parliament when it resumed later in the month. He resigned on 19 October 2009.

== Campaign ==
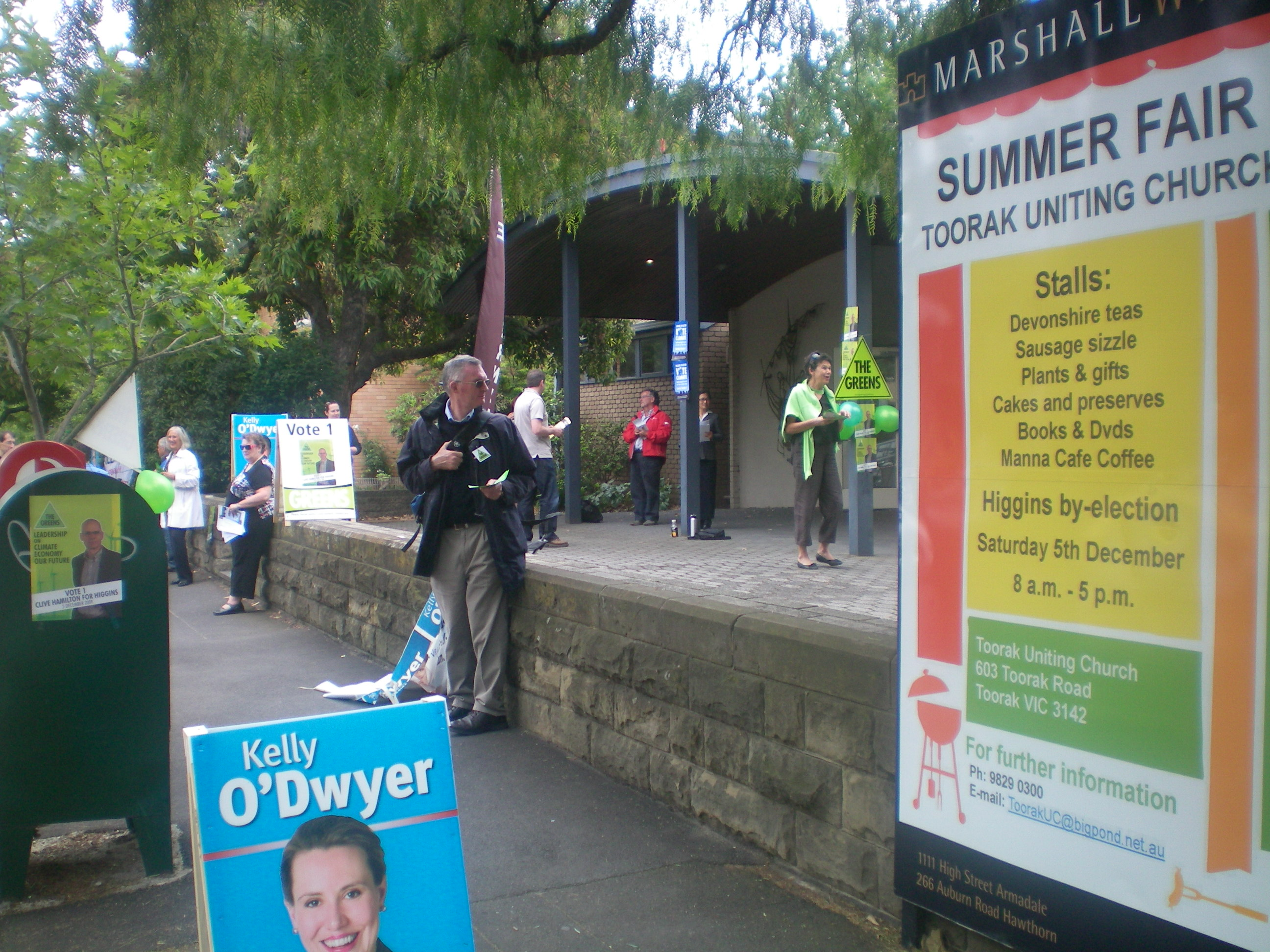
A polling booth at Toorak on polling day

The Labor Party did not nominate a candidate for the by-election.

The Higgins and Bradfield by-election campaigns were overshadowed by Liberal infighting over Labor Party government's Carbon Pollution Reduction Scheme, culminating in the replacement of Malcolm Turnbull with Tony Abbott as Liberal leader. Although fairly safe on paper, some commentators including Malcolm Mackerras tipped the Greens to defeat the Liberals in Higgins, and force the Liberals to preferences in Bradfield.

Liberal Party candidate Kelly O'Dwyer focussed her campaigning on local issues and attempted to distance herself from federal affairs, whereas the Greens Clive Hamilton campaigned primarily for stronger action on climate change.

== Candidates ==
The following table is the order and party affiliation of each candidate that has nominated to contest the seat of Higgins. Candidates are placed in the order of the ballot paper.

| Ballot Number | Party | Candidate | Profession | Notes |
|---|---|---|---|---|
| 1 | Independent | Stephen Murphy | Computer programmer | Supported by the unregistered Climate Sceptics Party |
| 2 | Australian Sex Party | Fiona Patten | Party leader | |
| 3 | Liberal Party of Australia | Kelly O'Dwyer | Executive, National Australia Bank | Former staffer for Peter Costello |
| 4 | Liberal Democratic Party | Isaac Roberts | Accountant | |
| 5 | Australian Greens | Dr Clive Hamilton | Professor of Public Ethics, Centre for Applied Philosophy and Public Ethics | Former executive director, the Australia Institute |
| 6 | Australian Democrats | David Collyer | Former Parliamentary Advisor | Worked for former senator Lyn Allison |
| 7 | Independent | Joseph Toscano | Anarchist campaigner | |
| 8 | One Nation | Steve Raskovy | | Former Hungarian wrestler and refugee |
| 9 | Independent | Peter Brohier | Lawyer | |
| 10 | Democratic Labor Party | John Mulholland | Psychologist | |

The Australian Labor Party did not stand a candidate.

== Results ==
The Liberal Party easily retained the seat.

2009 Higgins by-election
| Party | Candidate | Votes | % | ±% |
|---|---|---|---|---|
| Liberal | Kelly O'Dwyer | 36,421 | 54.57 | +0.96 |
| Greens | Clive Hamilton | 21,628 | 32.40 | +21.65 |
| Democratic Labour | John Mulholland | 2,572 | 3.85 | +3.85 |
| Sex Party | Fiona Patten | 2,144 | 3.21 | +3.21 |
| Democrats | David Collyer | 1,531 | 2.29 | +1.08 |
| Ind. Climate Sceptics | Stephen Murphy | 1,145 | 1.72 | +1.72 |
| Independent | Joseph Toscano | 523 | 0.78 | +0.78 |
| Liberal Democrats | Isaac Roberts | 336 | 0.50 | +0.50 |
| Independent | Peter Brohier | 236 | 0.35 | +0.35 |
| One Nation | Steve Raskovy | 211 | 0.32 | +0.32 |
| Total formal votes | | 66,747 | 95.85 | −1.58 |
| Informal votes | | 2,870 | 4.15 | +1.58 |
| Turnout | | 69,637 | 79.00 | −14.77 |
Two-candidate-preferred result
| Liberal | Kelly O'Dwyer | 40,203 | 60.23 | +3.19 |
| Greens | Clive Hamilton | 26,544 | 39.77 | +39.77 |
| Liberal hold | | Swing | N/A | |

== See also ==
- List of Australian federal by-elections
- 1968 Higgins by-election
