= Nicolette Boele =

Australian politician (born 1970)

Nicolette Boele MP
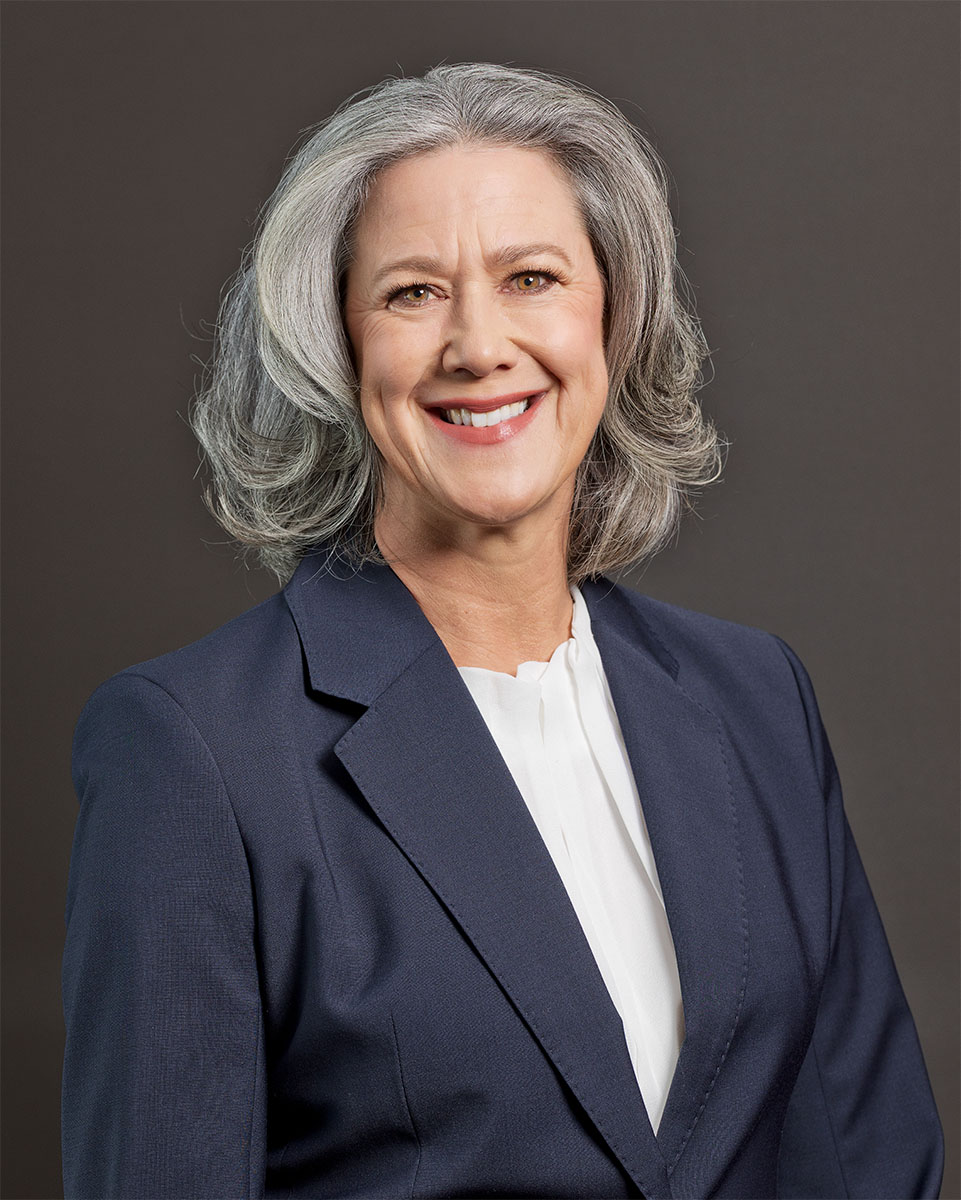
- Boele in 2025

Member of the Australian Parliament for Bradfield
- Incumbent
- Assumed office 3 May 2025
- Preceded by: Paul Fletcher

Personal details
- Born: Nicolette Boele; 10 November 1970 (age 55) Paddington, New South Wales, Australia
- Party: Independent
- Children: 2
- Education: University of Technology Sydney; Oxford Brookes University
- Occupation: Sustainability consultant; clean energy executive; politician
- Website: www.nicoletteboele.com.au

Nicolette Boele (/ˈbʊlə/ BUUL-ə, born 10 November 1970) is an Australian independent politician who has been the federal member of parliament (MP) for Bradfield since 2025.

Boele has a background in finance and renewable energy and has held executive roles in organisations such as the Responsible Investment Association Australasia, the Investor Group on Climate Change, and the Clean Energy Finance Corporation. She contested the 2022 federal election for the Division of Bradfield as a community independent and successfully ran again in 2025.

== Early life ==
The daughter of Dutch migrants, Boele attended Gordon East Primary School, Killara High School, and completed an undergraduate management degree at the University of Technology Sydney. She also holds a graduate certificate in environment and science from Oxford Brookes University.

== Career ==
Boele has held a range of roles across the renewable energy, environment, and sustainable finance sectors.

From 1996 to 1999, she was program leader for energy efficiency at the Sustainable Energy Development Authority of New South Wales, followed by her position as Sustainable Cities and Industries Campaign Coordinator at the Australian Conservation Foundation from 2000 to 2003. She then served as senior program and policy officer at the NSW Department of Environment, Climate Change and Water from 2003 to 2004, and later as director of strategic projects at the Climate Institute from 2006 to 2008. Between 2009 and 2015, Boele worked as principal for climate change (sustainability assurance and advice) at Banarra, and during that time also acted as chief of external affairs at the Clean Energy Finance Corporation from 2012 to 2013. She subsequently managed the Low Carbon Investment Registry at the Investor Group on Climate Change in 2014, and from 2015 to 2021 served as executive manager at Responsible Investment Association Australasia. Boele was an advisory board member at the Good Car Company (2021–2024) and an expert adviser on electrification at the Smart Energy Council (2022–2023).

== Political career ==
=== 2022 election campaign ===
In the 2022 Australian federal election, Boele contested the Division of Bradfield as a community independent candidate. She officially launched her campaign on 30 January 2022. She positioned herself as an advocate for climate action, political integrity and an affordable economy.

Following the election, she achieved a significant swing of 12.3 percentage points against the incumbent Liberal MP, Paul Fletcher, reducing his margin to 4.2 percentage points, the largest first preference swing against a sitting Liberal member in the 2022 election. Following this, Boele established a "shadow representative's office" to continue her advocacy within the community and announced she would run again in 2025.

=== 2025 election campaign ===
On 10 October 2024, the electoral boundaries of Bradfield were redistributed. The neighbouring seat of North Sydney was abolished, and most of its electors were transferred to Bradfield. This reduced the incumbent MP Paul Fletcher's margin to 2.5 percentage points. Fletcher announced in December 2024 that he would not seek re-election and retire from politics.

Boele ran again in the 2025 federal election against Liberal candidate Gisele Kapterian, with her campaign endorsed by the outgoing independent MP for North Sydney, Kylea Tink.

Boele amassed over 1,450 volunteers across the electorate, who collectively knocked on 30,000 doors to understand the priorities of local residents.

Boele appeared in multiple forums, including the 1MW #SheVotes Bradfield Community Forum, alongside Kapterian and other Bradfield candidates; the NSW Jewish Board of Deputies Bradfield Federal Election Community Debate, alongside Kapterian and other Bradfield candidates; the Australia Hong Kong Link Australia Election Bradfield Forum, alongside Kapterian, independent Andy Yin and a spokesperson for the Greens candidate Harjit Singh; an Australian Conservation Foundation event in St Ives with Greens candidate Singh and Louise McCallum of the Labor Party; Boele also attended an event hosted by the Ku-ring-gai Chamber of Commerce along with Kapterian, Yin, McCallum and Martin Cousins who was representing Greens candidate Singh.

The count for the election was extremely close. On election night, the ABC had projected that Boele might gain the seat, but almost a week later, postal votes changed the trajectory of the votes, resulting in the ABC calling the seat for Kapterian. Declaration votes shifted the momentum once again, returning the seat to "in doubt" status. On 19 May, Boele was leading in the provisional count before the full distribution of preferences took place, beating Kapterian by 39 votes. The Australian Electoral Commission then undertook an official and full distribution of preferences, eliminating Boele's lead and leaving both candidates with an equal vote count of 56,190. By the end of the full distribution of preferences, Kapterian was in the lead by just eight votes, automatically triggering a recount.

Upon the completion of the AEC's recount, Boele was elected by a margin of 26 votes against Liberal candidate Kapterian. This makes it the most marginal seat in the nation.

=== Member of Parliament ===
Boele was declared the member of parliament for the division of Bradfield on 4 June 2025 after a closely fought race, winning by a margin of 26 votes. Boele delivered her maiden speech on 28 July, calling out the government for their lack of ambition. On 15 July 2025, Kapterian launched a legal challenge in the Court of Disputed Returns disputing the result in Bradfield. On 25 September, Kapterian announced the withdrawal of the legal challenge. On 5 November, Boele asked treasurer Jim Chalmers to legislate a food donation tax incentive during question time. On 24 November, Nicolette Boele moved the motion to restrict gas exports and solve shortages, which was supported by Labor MP Ed Husic.

== Political views ==
=== Economics ===
Boele advocates for a fair and resilient economy that rewards effort, supports small business, and prepares Australia for future challenges. Boele supports cutting red tape to help small businesses thrive.

=== Environment ===
Boele has made a large part of her platform about ending coal mine approvals. She also wants to see more renewable energy infrastructure such as batteries, energy-efficient heat pumps and solar.

=== Housing ===
Boele has campaigned on increasing rent assistance, increasing the housing supply, and introducing a shared equity scheme.

=== Childcare ===
Boele advocates for high-quality, universal child care.

=== Gambling reform ===
Boele has criticised the federal government's slow response to gambling-related harm and has advocated for stronger restrictions on gambling advertising.

=== Cost of living ===
Boele identified the cost of living and grocery prices as two key concerns for voters in the seat of Bradfield. She has supported stronger consumer protections to address price gouging and ensure fair competition across essential goods and services. She wants to see an end to the duopoly between Coles and Woolworths.

=== Foreign policy ===
Following prime minister Anthony Albanese's declaration that Australia would recognise the state of Palestine at the United Nations General Assembly in September 2025, Boele called on the government to impose sanctions on the Israeli government and cease shipping supplies to Israel.

=== Transparency ===
Boele has opposed proposed changes to the Freedom of Information Act 1982 that she says could reduce public access to government decision-making.

== Bibliography ==
- Boele, Nicolette (1998). Alternative paths to sustainable tourism: problems, panaceas and pipe-dreams. London: Pinter.
- Boele, Nicolette (1993). Sustainability, the host community and Australian tourism policy. OCLC 1344529820.
- Boele, Nicolette; Tourism Council Australia; World Travel & Tourism Environment Research Centre; Australia Office of National Tourism (1996). Tourism switched on: sustainable energy technologies for the Australian tourism industry. Canberra: Tourism Council Australia. ISBN 9780646301488. OCLC 38414946.

Parliament of Australia
Preceded by Paul Fletcher	Member for Bradfield; 2025–present	Incumbent
