= David Connolly (politician) =

Australian politician and diplomat

David Connolly AM
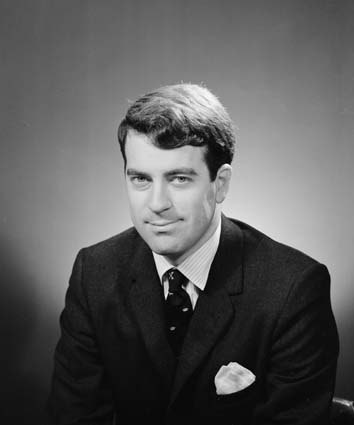
- Connolly in 1964

Member of the Australian Parliament for Bradfield
- In office 18 May 1974 – 29 January 1996
- Preceded by: Harry Turner
- Succeeded by: Brendan Nelson

Personal details
- Born: 20 July 1939 (age 87) Sydney
- Party: Liberal Party of Australia
- Education: St Ignatius College, Riverview
- Occupation: Diplomat
- Profession: Company director

David Miles Connolly AM (born 20 July 1939) is an Australian former politician and diplomat. He was a member of the Liberal Party and represented the Division of Bradfield in the House of Representatives from 1974 to 1996. He had been a member of the diplomatic service before entering politics and later served as High Commissioner of Australia to South Africa from 1998 to 2002.

== Early life ==
Connolly was born in Sydney and spent his early years with his parents in Sri Lanka. He was educated at Saint Ignatius' College, Riverview and at the University of Sydney. Connolly served on the Students' Representative Council (SRC) as the evening student's representative. He was a research officer with the NSW Liberal Party before becoming private secretary to Senator Sir Alister McMullin, the President of the Australian Senate, between 1963 and 1965 when he joined the Australian Diplomatic Service, and served in Sri Lanka, UN New York and Israel.

== Politics ==
In 1974 Connolly was selected as the Liberal candidate for the very safe seat of Bradfield on the retirement of the then member, Harry Turner. He was elected to the Australian House of Representatives, and held the seat until 1996, when he was defeated for preselection by future Liberal leader Brendan Nelson. In government he was chairman of the Parliamentary Public Accounts Committee between 1975 and 1983 and awarded a fellowship (FCPA) by the Australian Society of Accountants. In Opposition he was a shadow minister continuously up to his retirement. His major policy work was in superannuation, foreign relations and social policy. It has been speculated that without his pre-selection defeat he would have become a minister after the Coalition's massive win in 1996.

== Later life ==
Before serving as Australia's High Commissioner to South Africa between 1998 and 2002 with accreditation to Botswana, Lesotho and Swaziland, he was appointed an adviser to the first multi-ethnic South African Parliament by the Commonwealth Secretariat, Connolly later developed a close relationship with Nelson Mandela and accompanied him to Australia as a guest of the Howard government. Later he was a board member of ARIA, the Commonwealth's superannuation fund, and Chairman of Rice Warner Actuaries.

In the 2002 Queen's Birthday Honours (Australia), Connolly was made a Member of the Order of Australia for "service to the Parliament of Australia, to the development of superannuation policy reform, to international relations, and to the community".

== Recent works ==
In June 2022 he published Sunshine and Shade, a memoir of his childhood in Sri Lanka and his political and diplomatic life.(ATF Press)

Parliament of Australia
Preceded by Harry Turner	Member for Bradfield; 1974–1996	Succeeded by Brendan Nelson
Diplomatic posts
Preceded by Ian Porter	Australian High Commissioner to South Africa; 1998–2002	Succeeded by Ian Wilcock
