= Freedom and Prosperity Party (Australia) =

- President: Bill Koutalianos
- Founded: 2009; 17 years ago
- Dissolved: 2015; 11 years ago
- Headquarters: Mount Gambier, South Australia
- Ideology: Anthropogenic global warming denial
- Political position: Right-wing

The Freedom and Prosperity Party, formerly known as No Carbon Tax Climate Sceptics and The Climate Sceptics, was an Australian political party that describes itself as the world's first political party representing “climate sceptics”, dedicated to "...expose the fallacy of anthropogenic climate change".

The party was registered with the Australian Electoral Commission in early 2010, and endorsed candidates to stand in the 2010 federal election. Prior to being registered, party supporters stood as independent candidates in the Bradfield and Higgins by-elections.

== Electoral ==
The party endorsed 10 candidates for the Senate, and 6 for the House of Representatives in the 2010 elections. None were successful.

== Position on aspects of global warming ==
The Climate Sceptics Party explicitly rejects the scientific evidence for anthropogenic global warming and refers to climate science as “climate alarmism”, taking the following positions:

- Climate science is far from “settled”.
- The scientific consensus on climate change as summarized by the Intergovernmental Panel on Climate Change (IPCC) is crippled by huge uncertainties.
- An objective and quantitative risk–benefit analysis of any proposed “climate” legislation is crucial.

=== Carbon Pollution Reduction Scheme ===
The Climate Sceptics Party's policy on the Australian government's proposed emissions trading scheme, the Carbon Pollution Reduction Scheme (CPRS), is that the CPRS will result in Australian industry being at a competitive disadvantage leading to rising prices, that the CPRS will also cause corruption and fraud and the curtailing of human freedoms.

== Actions ==
On 13 July 2009, approximately 30 members of the Climate Sceptics Party and supporters arrived at the venue where Al Gore, was speaking in Melbourne, to hand out leaflets for those attending, with questions to ask Al Gore during his speech. Some wore T-shirts bearing the party's slogan: "Carbon Really Ain't Pollution - CRAP". In 2010 the Climate Sceptics organised a tour of Australia by Lord Monckton at a cost of $100,000.

The party's name on the Australian Electoral Commission's register was changed to "No Carbon Tax Climate Sceptics" on 14 December 2011.

The party has been involved in Glenn Druery's Minor Party Alliance.

In April 2015 the party was deregistered by the Australian Electoral Commission for a failure to demonstrate the required 500 members.

== See also ==
- Carbon tax in Australia
- Climate change denial
- Global Warming controversy
- Politics of global warming
