= 1952 Bradfield by-election =

Australian parliamentary by-election

A by-election was held for the Australian House of Representatives seat of Bradfield on 20 December 1952. This was triggered by the death of Liberal Party MP and former Prime Minister Billy Hughes.

The election was won by Liberal Party candidate Harry Turner on a severely reduced margin, but against an Independent candidate rather than one from the Labor Party, which did not field a candidate in the safe Liberal seat.

== Results ==
Bradfield by-election, 1952
Party	Candidate	Votes	%	±%
Liberal	Harry Turner	22,912	57.0	−21.7
Independent	Martin Hardie	15,336	38.2	+38.2
Independent Labor	John Somerville Smith	1,070	2.7	+2.7
Independent	Colin Potts	569	1.4	+1.4
Independent	Edward Wright	225	0.6	+0.6
Independent	Samuel Simons	84	0.2	+0.2
Total formal votes		40,196	98.1	−0.1
Informal votes		784	1.9	+0.1
Turnout		40,980	90.2	−5.6
Two-party-preferred result
Liberal	Harry Turner		58.4	−20.3
Independent	Martin Hardie		41.6	+41.6
Liberal hold		Swing	−20.3	

== See also ==
- List of Australian federal by-elections
