= Brendan Nelson =

Australian physician and former politician (born 1958)

The Honourable Dr Brendan Nelson AO
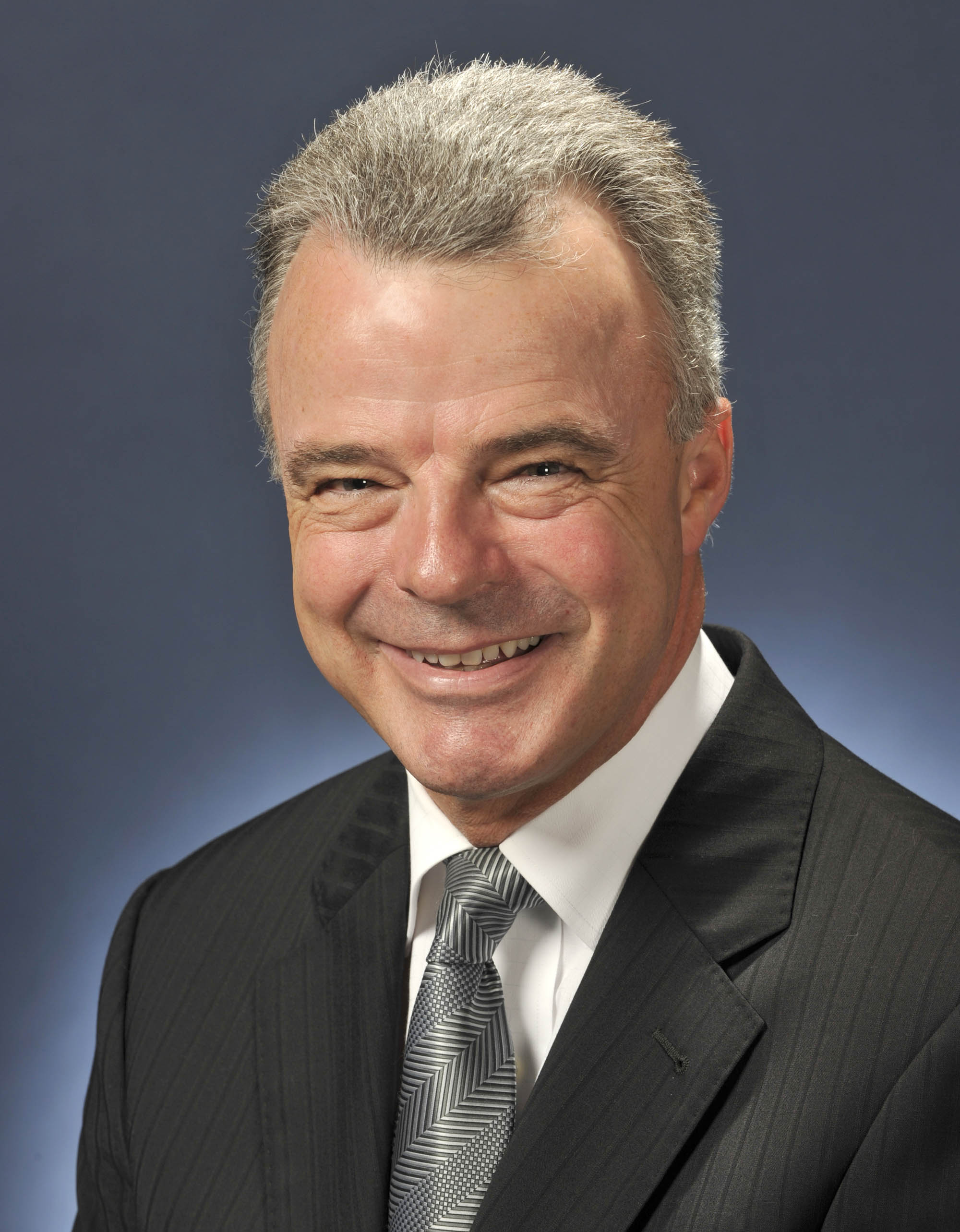
- Official portrait, 2009

Director of the Australian War Memorial
- In office 17 December 2012 – 23 December 2019
- Preceded by: Steve Gower
- Succeeded by: Matthew Anderson

Ambassador of Australia to Belgium, Luxembourg, the EU and NATO
- In office 17 September 2009 – 10 October 2012
- Preceded by: Alan Thomas
- Succeeded by: Duncan Lewis

Leader of the Opposition
- In office 3 December 2007 – 16 September 2008
- Prime Minister: Kevin Rudd
- Deputy: Julie Bishop
- Preceded by: Kevin Rudd
- Succeeded by: Malcolm Turnbull

Leader of the Liberal Party
- In office 29 November 2007 – 16 September 2008
- Deputy: Julie Bishop
- Preceded by: John Howard
- Succeeded by: Malcolm Turnbull

Minister for Defence
- In office 27 January 2006 – 3 December 2007
- Prime Minister: John Howard
- Preceded by: Robert Hill
- Succeeded by: Joel Fitzgibbon

Minister for Education, Science and Training
- In office 26 November 2001 – 27 January 2006
- Prime Minister: John Howard
- Preceded by: David Kemp
- Succeeded by: Julie Bishop

Member of the Australian Parliament for Bradfield
- In office 2 March 1996 – 19 October 2009
- Preceded by: David Connolly
- Succeeded by: Paul Fletcher

Personal details
- Born: Brendan John Nelson; 19 August 1958 (age 68) Coburg, Victoria, Australia
- Party: Liberal (after 1994)
- Other political affiliations: Labor (until 1994)
- Spouses: Deanna Nelson (m. 1981; div. 1982) Kate Nelson (m. 1983; div. 1999) Gillian Adamson (m. 1999)
- Children: 3
- Education: Saint Ignatius' College
- Alma mater: University of Adelaide; Flinders University
- Occupation: Medical practitioner (Self-employed)
- Profession: General practitioner Politician

Brendan John Nelson AO (born 19 August 1958) is an Australian business leader, physician and former politician. He served as the federal Leader of the Opposition from 2007 to 2008, going on to serve as Australia's senior diplomat to the European Union and NATO. He currently serves in a global leadership role with Boeing.

A medical doctor by profession, he came to public prominence as the Federal President of the Australian Medical Association (1993–95), and served as a Minister in the third and fourth terms of the Howard government, serving as Minister for Education, Science and Training (2001–06) and Minister for Defence (2006–2007).

Nelson was a member of the House of Representatives from 1996 to 2009, as the Liberal member for the Division of Bradfield in northern Sydney.

Following the 2007 federal election, at which the Howard government was defeated, Nelson was elected leader of the Liberal Party in a contest against former Minister for Environment and Water Resources Malcolm Turnbull, and became the Leader of the Opposition on 3 December 2007. On 16 September 2008, in a second contest following a spill motion, Nelson lost the leadership of the Opposition and the Liberal Party to Turnbull.

Nelson retired from politics in 2009, and was Ambassador to Belgium, Luxembourg, the European Union and NATO from 2009 to 2012. He was then Director of the Australian War Memorial from 2012 to 2019, subsequently serving as its chair until the end of 2022.

In February 2020, Nelson was made the President of Boeing Australia, New Zealand, and South Pacific. In September 2022, it was announced he would move to London to become President of Boeing International.

== Early life ==
Nelson was born in Coburg, a suburb of Melbourne, as the eldest of three children of Des Nelson, a marine chief steward active in the Seamen's Union, and his wife, Patricia. In his infancy, his family moved to his mother's home town of Launceston, Tasmania.

In his early teenage years, the Nelson family relocated again to Adelaide, South Australia, where he matriculated at Saint Ignatius' College before going on to study economics at the University of Adelaide. However, he dropped out in his first year, working in various casual jobs in retail and hospitality before returning to university to study medicine. He switched to Flinders University to complete his Bachelor of Medicine and Surgery (MBBS).

== Medical career ==
=== General practice career ===
Nelson then relocated to Hobart, Tasmania, taking up practice as a medical practitioner from 1985 until 1995. In 1986, he married for a second time, and became a father to twins. In 1987, he and David Crean, brother of Labor politician Simon Crean and later a Tasmanian state Labor minister, established an after-hours locum service which he worked in until 1991.

=== President of the Australian Medical Association ===
In 1988, Nelson joined the Australian Medical Association, and in 1990 became the Tasmanian State president of the organisation, taking a reformist approach to the role, and assisted the State branch in growing its membership. In 1991, he replaced Michael Jones, a former AMA president from Western Australia, as federal AMA vice-president. He took a strong public stand against sponsorship of sports events by cigarette companies, lobbying politicians directly for legislative change, and also encouraged airlines to increase the number of non-smoking seats.

On 30 May 1993, Nelson was elected unopposed as federal president of the Australian Medical Association, at 34 being the youngest ever holder of the office. He came to the office after significant hostility between the AMA and the federal Labor government, which peaked at the 1993 election under former AMA president Bruce Shepherd and former Health Minister Brian Howe. Nelson attempted to establish better relations with the government and its new Health Minister, Graham Richardson. He pledged to make Aboriginal health and the effects of unemployment on health a high priority during his term as federal president, and would appoint a full-time worker based in Canberra to look after these issues.

In an address to the National Press Club on 30 September 1993, acknowledging the AMA's reputation for conservatism, he said he would not "lead the AMA safely", but believed doctors should "lead the way in showing that national progress can be made by placing the welfare and consideration of other human beings ahead of their own," asserting their obligation to speak out on issues for the public good. In the address, he advocated gay law reform, greater concern for the environment, more attention to Aboriginal and unemployed health, and greater co-operation between the medical profession and politicians of all sides to build a better health system. In November, he told a national Aboriginal conference in Sydney that he was ashamed of the medical profession's track record on Aboriginal health, arguing that "doctors need to ask themselves how a person can be well when they've been denied their land, their hunting grounds, their citizenship and freedom and even their own children. Of course Aboriginal people's health has suffered when you look at this litany of misery". As president, while personally opposing euthanasia, he supported the right of doctors to withdraw treatment from consenting critically ill patients, and supported euthanasia campaigner Philip Nitschke's case against the Royal Darwin Hospital.

The role of private health in the health care mix, Aboriginal health, the AMA's ongoing campaign against cigarette sponsorship of sports events, and the size of the Medicare levy were other significant issues which occupied a lot of Nelson's time and attention as federal president, as they did the various Ministers for Health in the final years of the Keating government. Nelson took ministers and shadow ministers around Central Australia to view Aboriginal communities. In October 1994, the World Conference on Tobacco and Health in Paris unanimously adopted an AMA resolution calling for a formal United Nations strategy on tobacco control.

== Political career ==
=== Early involvement with the Australian Labor Party ===
Nelson's father's strong involvement in the union movement and the Australian Labor Party influenced his early political development, and he joined Labor at the age of 13. However, he resigned from the Labor Party in 1991 before accepting a role on the AMA executive, on account of his perception of it as an apolitical position.

At a rowdy pre-election rally during the 1993 election campaign in Toorak, as vice-president of the AMA, he declared via a megaphone that "I have never voted Liberal in my life!" On 25 November 1993, he told journalist and medical writer Steve Dow that Labor governments generally were better for Australia but not always in their handling of health care.

=== Early political career ===
In January 1994, Nelson joined the Tasmanian branch of the Liberal Party of Australia. After initially being tipped for the South Australian seat of Boothby, being vacated by outgoing Liberal MP Steele Hall, he sold his Tasmanian home, and moved to Lindfield in the affluent North Shore region of Sydney, establishing a surgery at The Rocks and switching his membership to the Pymble branch. On 30 January 1995, he announced his nomination for the preselection contest for Bradfield, a safe Liberal seat in which Pymble was located and held since 1974 by shadow minister David Connolly. The seat had been in Liberal hands for its entire existence, and the Liberals held it with a 27-percent majority, making it the safest Coalition seat in Sydney and one of the safest Coalition seats in metropolitan Australia. He was supported in his bid by former AMA president Bruce Shepherd, who served as his campaign treasurer. On 1 March 1995, at a Liberal gathering, he renounced his view that Labor governments had been better for Australia, and stated that he believed Medicare was unsustainable and that voluntary work programs for the unemployed would build self-esteem, and advocated a consumption tax. He also declared that he intended to be a high-profile member of Parliament, saying "if all I wanted to do was be a parliamentarian, a seat-warmer, I would have gone for a marginal seat." A bitter preselection campaign ensued; and, on 13 May 1995, he gained the party's endorsement on a 96-to-93 vote, even though Connolly had the support of Liberal leader John Howard and deputy leader Peter Costello. Nelson claimed his win was "a victory for liberalism".

After the preselection, Nelson worked on an Aboriginal health program for the Cape York Peninsula; and, in June, following his retirement as president of the AMA, went to the slums of Nairobi, Kenya, on behalf of World Vision to hear about that country's struggles with AIDS, three months after losing his younger brother to the disease.

On 14 July 1995, as master of ceremonies for a fundraising dinner supporting Howard, he was criticised for his risque humour concerning then-current entertainment and political events, not having realised that Lady Fairfax, Lady McMahon, and conservative business leaders were in the audience. The incident attracted considerable publicity and there were calls from inside the Liberal Party to reverse his preselection, but he was supported by key decision-makers including the president of the NSW Liberal Party.

=== Member for Bradfield (1996–2009) ===
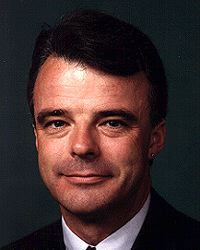
Nelson shortly after his election to Parliament.

Nelson was elected to Parliament as expected at the federal election on 2 March 1996, at which the Keating government was defeated and John Howard became Prime Minister. Although he suffered a tiny swing against him, he still took 64.7 percent of the primary vote and 75.8 percent after preferences were distributed. Nelson spent his first two terms as a government backbencher, while establishing himself as a leading member of the moderate, or "small-l liberal," wing of the Liberal Party.

Nelson was a vocal opponent of the views of Independent MP Pauline Hanson following her maiden speech on 10 September 1996, challenging her to visit Palm Island and other Aboriginal communities with him. On 6 October, he proposed a bipartisan condemnation of her statements along lines already suggested by Labor Opposition leader Kim Beazley, saying that politicians had an obligation to show leadership on the issue. He questioned the Prime Minister, who offered to cooperate and negotiate, but indicated he would not support the Opposition's motion in full. On 19 October, Nelson said he believed the Government needed to more clearly repudiate Hanson's claims, and that she was "appealing to a primeval instinct" in her statements on Aboriginals and Asian migrants. On 30 October 1996, a bipartisan motion on tolerance, nondiscriminatory immigration and Aboriginal reconciliation was moved and passed.

In December 1996, Liberal MP Kevin Andrews raised a private members' bill to overturn the Northern Territory's euthanasia legislation, which had been championed by Dr Philip Nitschke. Nelson, along with former New South Wales premier John Fahey, were accused of convincing the son of the first man to die under the law, who had previously been a euthanasia advocate, to change his mind. The man, a branch secretary of a rural Liberal branch, ended up in hospital after suffering a nervous breakdown following the publicity surrounding the matter. When the bill went through the House of Representatives on 10 December, Nelson was one of 88 MPs who voted for Andrews' bill on a conscience vote. Nelson also had to apologise to Parliament in March 1997 when it was found that 11 parts of a speech he had given matched a paper on overseas doctors by immigration expert Bob Birrell of Monash University published the previous year.

Nelson was appointed Parliamentary Secretary to the Minister for Defence in 2001. In this role he directed the Mulwala ammunition factory to be decontaminated and decommissioned.

=== Minister for Education, Science and Training (2001–2006) ===
After the 2001 federal election he was promoted directly to Cabinet with the senior portfolio of Minister for Education, Science and Training. Despite Bradfield's long-standing status as a comfortably safe Liberal seat, Nelson was the first person to be promoted to cabinet while holding the seat.

He introduced a series of radical changes to Australia's higher education system that simultaneously imposed more direct government control over the management of universities while also allowing them to earn more revenue by charging higher fees to students. He extended the government's policy of directing more federal funding to non-government schools, as well as becoming more involved in reviewing the state education systems. In 2005 he introduced Voluntary Student Unionism. He was a popular target for student activism because of these changes.

Nelson announced in August 2004 that public schools "must have a functioning flagpole, fly the Australian flag and display the values framework in a prominent place in the school."

In 2005 Nelson expressed support for giving parents the option of having students exposed to the controversial subject of intelligent design. However he emphasised that evolution should always hold first place saying, "I'd be quite concerned if intelligent design were to replace evolution." He later said intelligent design should only be taught in religion or philosophy classes.

=== Minister for Defence (2006–2007) ===
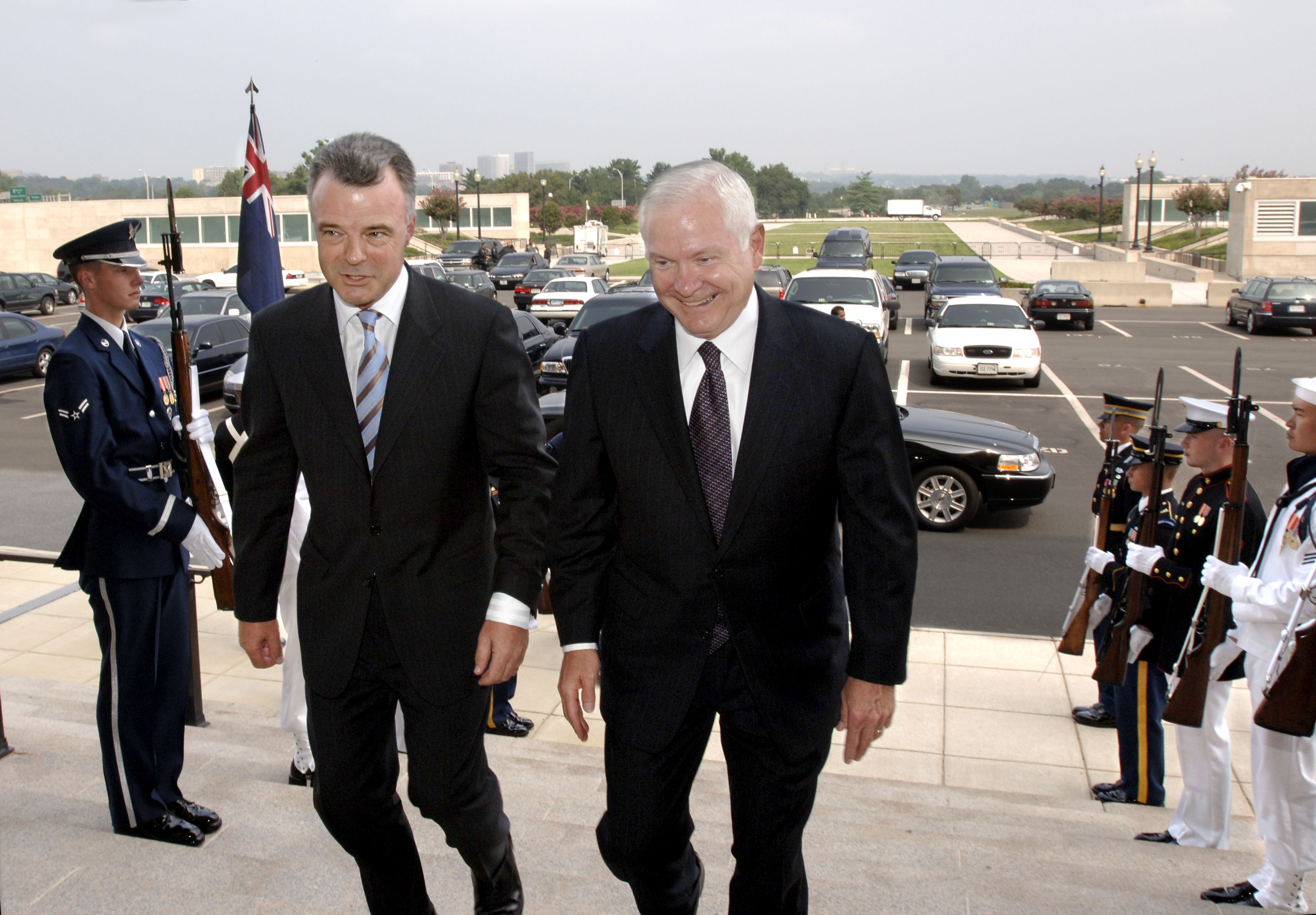
Nelson with Robert Gates in August 2007

After his rapid promotion to Cabinet, Nelson was spoken of as a possible future Liberal leader. On 24 January 2006, then Prime Minister John Howard announced Nelson's promotion from the Education, Science and Training portfolio to the high profile Defence portfolio.

As Defence Minister, he made the controversial decision to purchase Boeing's Super Hornet aircraft instead of a fighter perceived by some to be more capable.

=== Leader of the Opposition (2007–2008) ===
Following the defeat of the Howard government at the 2007 federal election, he was elected Liberal party leader and therefore Leader of the Opposition, narrowly defeating Malcolm Turnbull in a 45 to 42 vote, after the withdrawal from the race of Tony Abbott. After Nelson's election, his political past resurfaced, with him claiming he came from a Labor family.

Nelson became the first person since Billy Snedden in 1972 to become Opposition Leader without prior experience in Opposition. Nelson also became the first Catholic to lead the Liberal Party.

Nelson was elected Liberal leader on 29 November, four days before the commission of the Howard government and hence his appointment as Defence Minister was terminated. This meant that technically he was both Liberal leader and Defence Minister in those four days.

On 1 December 2007 Nelson attempted to distance himself from some of the conservative policies of his predecessor, saying "I don't support gay marriage, adoption or IVF. But I believe in addressing the social and economic injustices affecting homosexuals."

Nelson declared that the Liberal Party had "listened and learned" from the Australian public on WorkChoices. He pronounced the program "dead," vowing it would never be resurrected as part of Coalition policy, and called on the Government to move quickly to introduce draft industrial relations legislation.

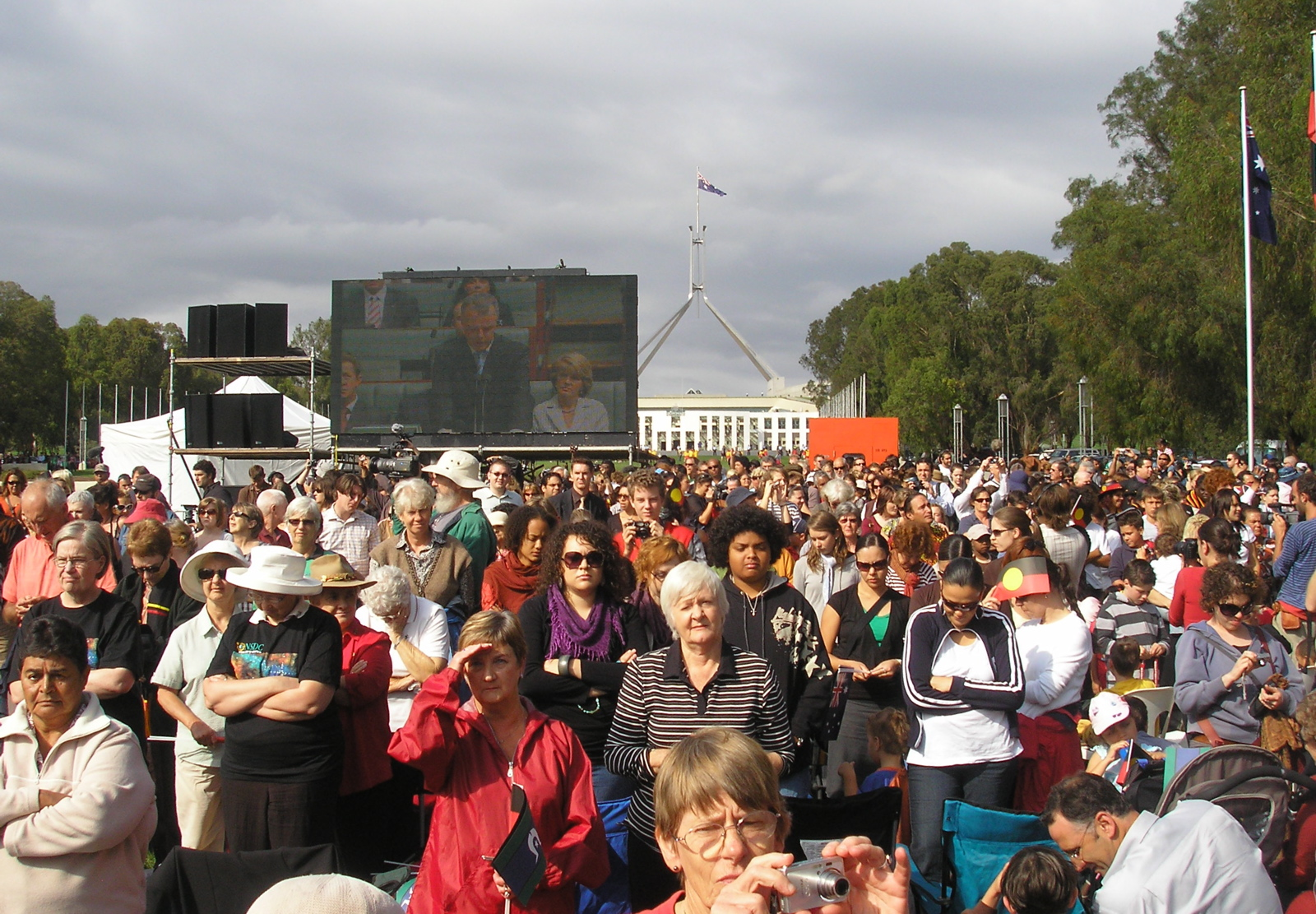
Crowds turn their backs part way through Brendan Nelson's reply to the Parliamentary apology for the stolen generations in February 2008.

In January 2008, Nelson opposed making any formal apology to the Indigenous Australians known as the "Stolen Generations". Nelson said such an apology would fuel guilt among middle Australia, and cause a mentality of "victimhood" among indigenous Australians. In early February 2008, Nelson changed his stance, and declared that he supported the apology, first personally, then also on behalf of his party:

I, on behalf of the Coalition, of the alternative government of Australia, are [sic] providing in-principle support for the offer of an apology to the forcibly removed generations of Aboriginal children.

When a motion formally apologising to the Stolen Generations was put before the House on 13 February, Nelson voted in favour, as did all Coalition members present in the chamber. However, seven members of Nelson's caucus—Peter Dutton, Don Randall, Sophie Mirabella, Dennis Jensen, Wilson Tuckey, Luke Simpkins and Alby Schultz—were absent. Before the vote, Nelson delivered a 20-minute speech endorsing the apology. Nelson's endorsement triggered nationwide protests; several people watching the speech booed, jeered and turned their backs on him.

Nelson's leadership came under increased pressure in January 2008, after an MP shifted loyalties to Turnbull, and taking into consideration that former MP Dave Tollner had been allowed to vote in the initial contest, the leadership vote would now be deadlocked at 43–43. Newspoll polling in February 2008 set a record low "Preferred Prime Minister" rating for any opposition leader at 9 percent, with March polling setting another record of 7 percent, with two-party-preferred setting another Newspoll record at 37–63 percent. Nelson responded by declaring himself the underdog. In response to increased speculation about his leadership Nelson commented in April that he "will keep fighting and standing up for everyday Australians.".

Nelson used his 2008 budget reply to declare the Rudd government budget a "tax and spend" budget, as well as arguing for a 5-cent reduction in petrol excise, and pledging to block an increase in the "alcopop" tax.

In May 2008, Nelson gave his approval to a merger occurring between the Queensland Liberal Party and Queensland National Party.

Support for Nelson as leader within the Liberal Party had all but collapsed by the end of July 2008, in part due to repeated gaffes on emissions trading and climate change. Expected to challenge him was either Peter Costello or Malcolm Turnbull, upon the release of Costello's book, The Costello Memoirs. Costello stated he would not be making any move for the Liberal leadership, however media outlets capitalised on Costello's failure to categorically rule out any future leadership challenge.

Nelson suffered from another gaffe in August 2008, where he stated:

Peter's made his decision that he did not seek the leadership of the party. As I've said before, I'd be very happy if he changes his mind.

He later attempted to clarify the comment in that he was referring to Costello staying in parliament.

Despite a small and steady increase after record low polling, Nelson lost the leadership of the Liberal Party to Shadow Treasurer, Malcolm Turnbull, on 16 September 2008 by 45 to 41 votes in a spill. Nelson went to the backbench.

Turnbull and later Liberal leader Tony Abbott eventually became prime ministers and meant that Nelson (along with Peter Dutton and Sussan Ley) is one of three 21st-century Liberal leaders not to become prime minister.

=== Resignation from politics ===
On 16 February 2009, Nelson announced that he would retire from politics at the next federal election. On 25 August 2009, he announced that he would resign from Parliament in late September 2009. Nearly two months later, Nelson officially resigned on 19 October 2009, triggering the 2009 Bradfield by-election. He maintains an interest in Australian political life, recently speaking at a Liberal Party event in honour of Australia's first Indigenous Parliamentarian, Senator Neville Bonner.

== Post-political career ==
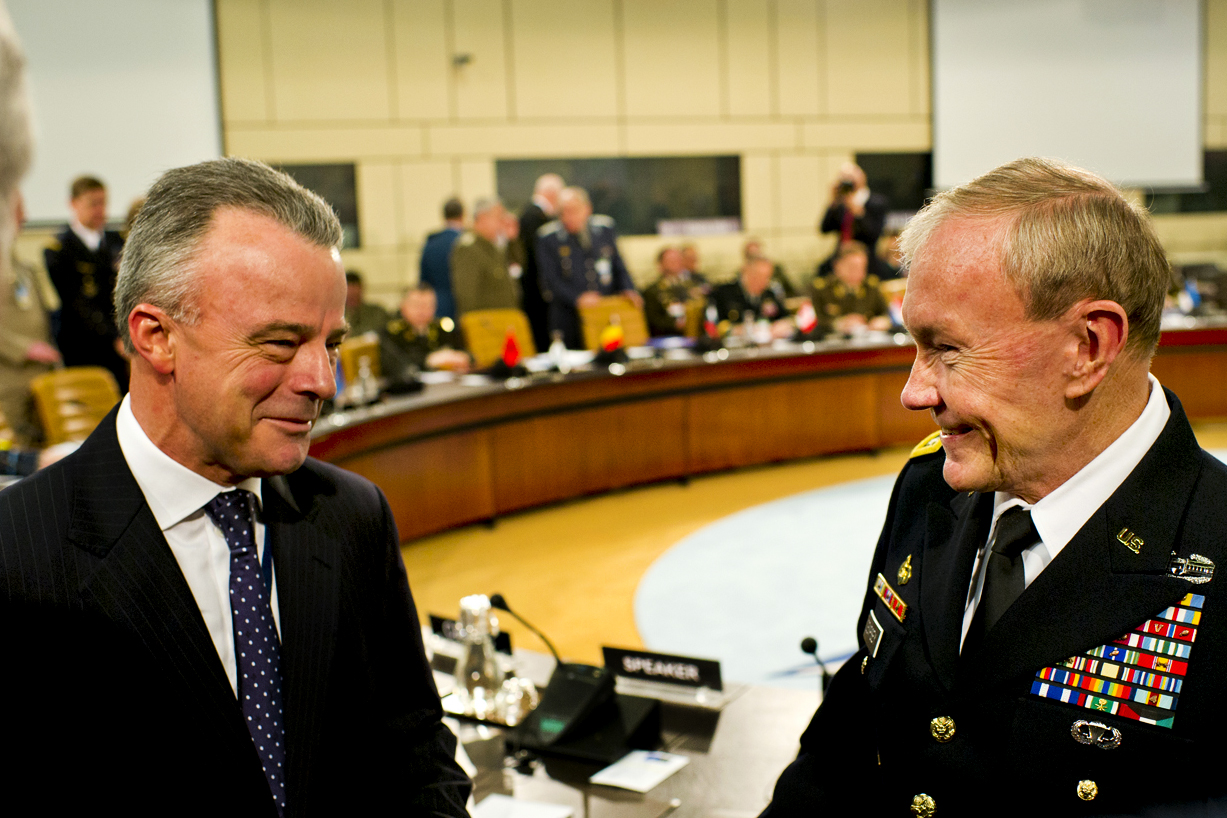
Brendan Nelson, as Australia's ambassador to the European Union, speaks with U.S. Army Gen. Martin E. Dempsey, chairman of the Joint Chiefs of Staff, at a North Atlantic Council meeting in Brussels, April 26, 2012.

=== Diplomatic appointments ===
On 17 September 2009, Foreign Minister Stephen Smith appointed Nelson as the Ambassador to Belgium, Luxembourg, the European Union, and NATO, at the same time appointing former Federal Labor Leader Kim Beazley as the Australian Ambassador to the United States. Prime Minister Kevin Rudd announced the appointments in Canberra the same day. Nelson accepted the appointment from his former rival and commended the decision to appoint Beazley as Ambassador to the US. Nelson said of both appointments, they "would be accepted across the political spectrum."

=== Director of the Australian War Memorial ===
On 23 August 2012, the government announced Nelson's forthcoming appointment in the Australian Public Service as the new Director of the Australian War Memorial effective from 17 December 2012, succeeding Major General Steve Gower. In August 2019, Nelson announced that after seven years he would be stepping down as head of the Australian War Memorial.

=== Business appointments ===
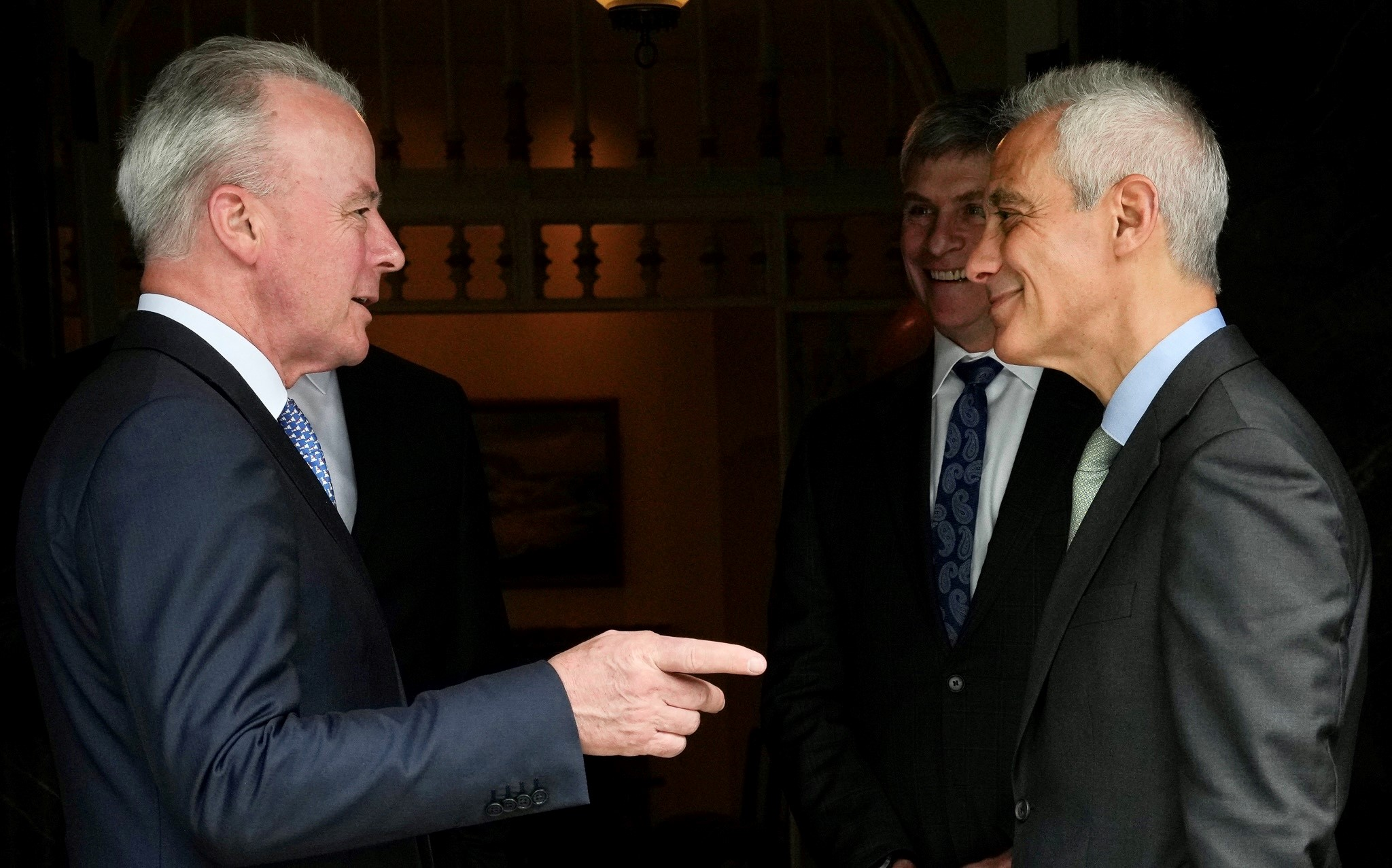
Nelson meeting with Rahm Emanuel (U.S. ambassador to Japan) in 2023 during his tenure with Boeing

In February 2020, Nelson became the president of Boeing Australia. In December 2022, it was announced that effective January 12, 2023, Nelson would serve as the head of Boeing's international division. In 2025 he was nominated as the HSBC interim chairman and later same year assumed the permanent position. |url=https://www.hsbc.com/who-we-are/our-people/board-of-directors |

== Personal life ==
Nelson is married to Gillian, whom he married in 1999, raising her daughter together. He was previously married to Kate, a nurse. They married in 1983, were together 15 years, raising their twins, a son and daughter. Whilst a student, he had been briefly married to his childhood sweetheart, Deanna.

In 1995, his brother, Philip, died after a long battle with AIDS.

Nelson's hobbies include playing guitar and riding motorcycles, a habit he began at 17 when he dropped out of an economics degree at the University of Adelaide and needed a cheap form of transport.

In 2016 Nelson was appointed an Officer of the Order of Australia in recognition for his distinguished service to the Parliament of Australia, to the community, to the advancement of Australia's international relations, and to major cultural institutions.

Professional and academic associations
Preceded by Bruce Shepherd	President of the Australian Medical Association; 1993–1995	Succeeded by David Weedon
Parliament of Australia
Preceded by David Connolly	Member for Bradfield; 1996–2009	Succeeded by Paul Fletcher
Political offices
Preceded by Eric Abetz	Parliamentary Secretary to the Minister for Defence; 2001	Succeeded by Fran Bailey
Preceded by David Kemp as Minister for Education, Training and Youth Affairs	Minister for Education, Science and Training; 2001–2006	Succeeded by Julie Bishop
Preceded by Robert Hill	Minister for Defence; 2006–2007	Succeeded by Joel Fitzgibbon
Preceded by Kevin Rudd	Leader of the Opposition of Australia; 2007–2008	Succeeded by Malcolm Turnbull
Party political offices
Preceded by John Howard	Leader of the Liberal Party of Australia; 2007–2008	Succeeded by Malcolm Turnbull
Diplomatic posts
Preceded by Alan Thomas	Ambassador of Australia to Belgium, Luxembourg and the EU; 2010–2012	Succeeded by Duncan Lewis
New title	Ambassador of Australia to NATO; 2012	Succeeded by Duncan Lewis
Government offices
Preceded by Steve Gower	Director of the Australian War Memorial; 2012–2019	Succeeded by Matt Anderson
Preceded by Kerry Stokes	Chair of the Australian War Memorial Council; 2022	Succeeded by Kim Beazley
