= Division of Bradfield =

Australian federal electoral division

Coordinates: 33.732°S 151.146°E

Bradfield Australian House of Representatives Division
- Interactive map of electorate boundaries from the 2025 federal election
- Created: 1949
- MP: Nicolette Boele
- Party: Independent
- Namesake: John Bradfield
- Electors: 126,914 (2025)
- Area: 105 km^{2} (40.5 sq mi)
- Demographic: Inner metropolitan
Electorates around Bradfield:
| Berowra | Berowra | Mackellar |
| Berowra | Bradfield | Mackellar |
| Bennelong | Warringah; Bennelong | Warringah |

Footnotes

The Division of Bradfield is an Australian electoral division in the state of New South Wales. It is located on Sydney's North Shore. Since 2025, it has been held by independent MP Nicolette Boele.

== History ==
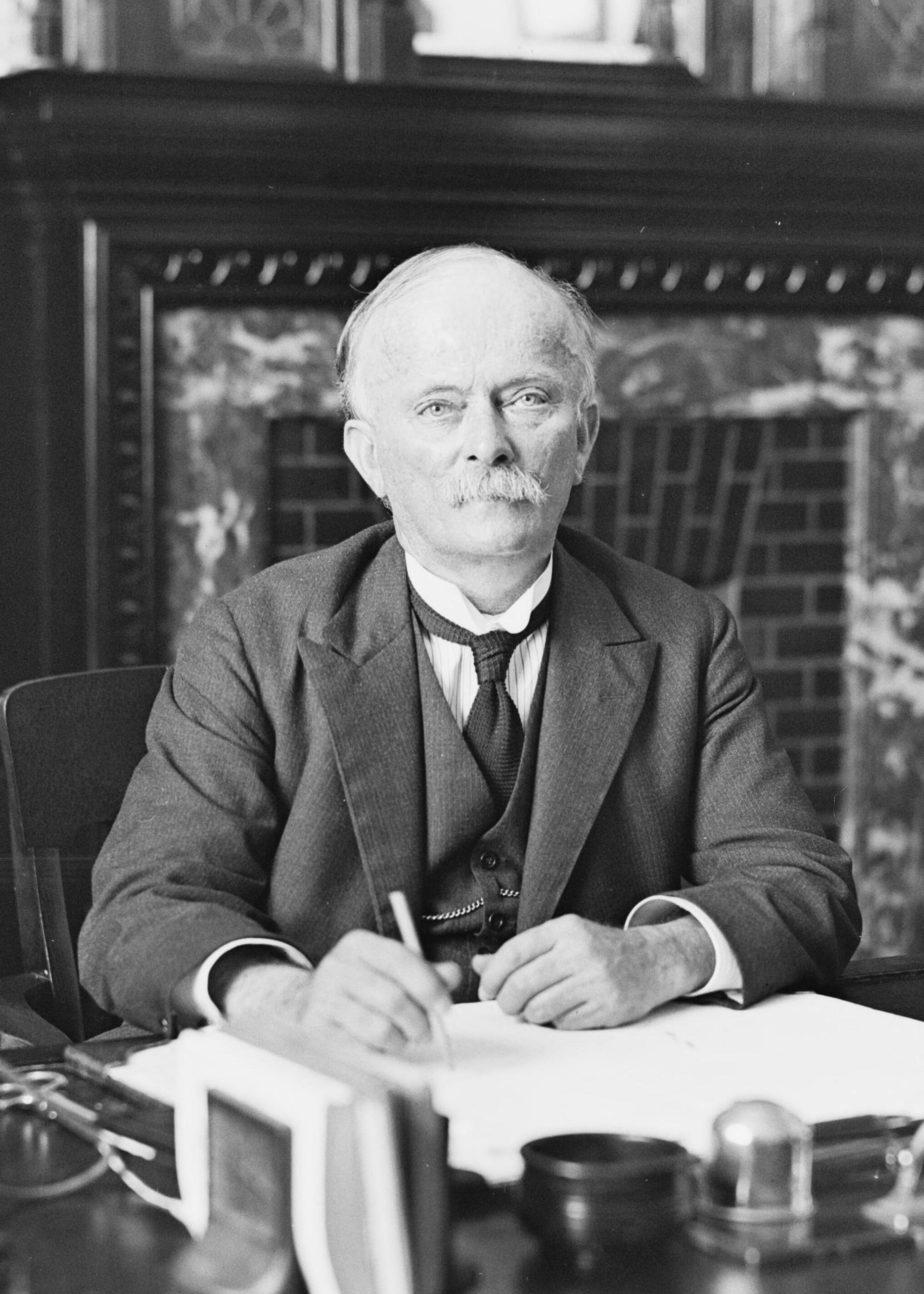
John Bradfield, the division's namesake

Bradfield was created in the 1949 expansion of Parliament, and was named in honour of John Bradfield, the designer and builder of the Sydney Harbour Bridge. Its first member was Billy Hughes, a former Prime Minister of Australia and the last serving member of the first federal Parliament. The bulk of the seat was carved out of North Sydney, which Hughes represented from 1923 to 1949. After Hughes, its best-known member was Brendan Nelson, a minister in the third and fourth Howard governments and the federal Leader of the Opposition from 2007 to 2008. It was represented from the 2009 Bradfield by-election until 2025 by Paul Fletcher, a member of the Liberal Party of Australia. Since 2025, it has been represented by independent Nicolette Boele.

Located in the traditional Liberal stronghold of Sydney's North Shore, Bradfield had until 2025 been in Liberal hands for its entire existence, and for most of that time has been regarded as a very safe Liberal seat. Most of the territory covered by the seat had been represented by centre-right MPs since Federation.

While Labor historically runs dead on the North Shore, Bradfield is particularly hostile territory for Labor; the party has never come anywhere close to winning the seat. The Liberal hold on the seat has only been even remotely threatened twice. At a 1952 by-election triggered by Hughes' death, the Liberals were held to 58 percent of the two-party vote. Even then, the Liberals still won more than enough primary votes to retain the seat without the need for preferences.

In the 2022 federal election, Voices of Bradfield-endorsed independent candidate Nicolette Boele slashed the Liberal margin in the seat from 16.56% to 4.23%, turning Bradfield into a marginal seat on a two-candidate preferred basis for the first time in its history, amid the collapse of Liberal support in the North Shore. The swing against the Liberals was enough to drop the Liberal margin in a "traditional" two-party contest with Labor to 56 percent, the first time the seat has been marginal against Labor. The Liberal primary vote plummeted to 45.05%, the first time the Liberal Party received less than 50% of the primary vote in Bradfield. The Liberals lost 15.28% of their primary vote, the largest swing in the country.

In the 2025 Australian federal election, Boele ran in the seat again, while the Liberal party selected Gisele Kapterian after the retirement of Paul Fletcher. The count was extremely close between Boele and Kapterian. On election night, the ABC projected that Boele would win the seat, but in the following week, postal votes favoured Kapterian, resulting in the ABC calling the seat for her. Declaration votes shifted the momentum once again, returning the seat to doubt. On 19 May, Boele was declared the provisional winner, beating Kapterian by fewer than 50 votes. The Australian Electoral Commission immediately announced it would undertake an official recount and full distribution of preferences to determine the winner. After the full distribution of preferences was completed on 4 June, Boele was declared to have won the seat by 26 votes. The Liberal Party challenged the result in the High Court as Court of Disputed Returns; but, after both parties had had an opportunity to re-scrutinise the ballot papers, it conceded that Boele had won by 26 votes.

== Geography ==
Bradfield is located in the upper North Shore and covers an area of approximately 105 km^{2}, covering the suburbs of Artarmon, Castle Cove, Castlecrag, East Killara, East Lindfield, Gordon, Killara, Lindfield, Middle Cove, Naremburn, North Turramurra, North Wahroonga, North Willoughby, Northbridge, Pymble, Roseville, Roseville Chase, South Turramurra, St Ives, St Ives Chase, Turramurra, Warrawee, West Pymble, Willoughby and Willoughby East; as well as parts of Cammeray, Chatswood, Chatswood West, St Leonards and Wahroonga.

Bradfield underwent minor boundary changes with the 2016 redistribution, shifting slightly south, gaining Castle Cove and parts of Chatswood from North Sydney while losing parts of Thornleigh, Normanhurst and Hornsby to Berowra. The 2025 redistribution saw the electorate once again move south, gaining most of the City of Willoughby from the abolished seat of North Sydney, while losing Asquith, Hornsby, Normanhurst, Waitara and parts of Wahroonga to Berowra.

Since 1984, federal electoral division boundaries in Australia have been determined at redistributions by a redistribution committee appointed by the Australian Electoral Commission. Redistributions occur for the boundaries of divisions in a particular state, and they occur every seven years, or sooner if a state's representation entitlement changes or when divisions of a state are malapportioned.

== Demographics ==
2021 Australian census
Ancestry
| Response | Bradfield | NSW | Australia |
|---|---|---|---|
| English | 26.6% | 29.8% | 33.0% |
| Chinese | 24.5% | 7.2% | 5.5% |
| Australian | 21.0% | 28.6% | 29.9% |
| Irish | 8.0% | 9.1% | 9.5% |
| Scottish | 7.7% | 7.7% | 8.6% |
| Other | 12.2% | | |
Country of birth
| Response | Bradfield | NSW | Australia |
| Australia | 51.8% | 65.4% | 66.9% |
| China | 11.2% | 3.1% | 2.2% |
| England | 4.4% | 2.9% | 3.6% |
| India | 3.4% | 2.6% | 2.6% |
| Hong Kong | 3.0% | 0.6% | 0.4% |
| South Africa | 2.5% | 0.6% | 0.7% |
| Other | 23.7% | | |
Religious affiliation
| No religion | 40.3% | 32.8% | 38.4% |
| Catholicism | 16.7% | 22.4% | 20.0% |
| Anglicanism | 13.2% | 11.9% | 9.8% |
| Hinduism | 4.3% | 3.4% | 2.7% |
| Other | 25.5% | | |
Language spoken at home
| Australian English | 58.6% | 67.6% | 72.0% |
| Mandarin | 13.6% | 3.4% | 2.7% |
| Cantonese | 6.0% | 1.8% | 1.2% |
| Korean | 2.8% | 0.8% | 0.5% |
| Hindi | 1.5% | 1.0% | 0.8% |
| Persian | 1.4% | 0.3% | 0.3% |
| Other | 16.1% | | |

== Members ==
| Image | Member | Party | Term | Notes |
|---|---|---|---|---|
| | Billy Hughes (1862–1952) | Liberal | 10 December 1949 – 28 October 1952 | Previously held the Division of North Sydney. Died in office. Longest serving parliamentarian and the oldest to have served as of 2026 |
| | Harry Turner (1905–1988) | Liberal | 20 December 1952 – 11 April 1974 | Previously held the New South Wales Legislative Assembly seat of Gordon. Retired |
| | David Connolly (1939–) | Liberal | 18 May 1974 – 29 January 1996 | Lost preselection and retired |
| | Brendan Nelson (1958–) | Liberal | 2 March 1996 – 19 October 2009 | Served as minister under Howard. Served as Opposition Leader from 2007 to 2008. Resigned to retire from politics |
| | Paul Fletcher (1965–) | Liberal | 5 December 2009 – 28 March 2025 | Served as minister under Turnbull and Morrison. Retired |
| | Nicolette Boele (1970–) | Independent | 3 May 2025 – present | Incumbent |

== Election results ==
2025 Australian federal election: Bradfield
| Party | Candidate | Votes | % | ±% |
|---|---|---|---|---|
| Liberal | Gisele Kapterian | 42,676 | 38.03 | −5.63 |
| Independent | Nicolette Boele | 30,309 | 27.01 | +10.95 |
| Labor | Louise McCallum | 22,768 | 20.29 | +2.56 |
| Greens | Harjit Singh | 7,551 | 6.73 | −1.89 |
| Independent | Andy Yin | 4,635 | 4.13 | +4.13 |
| One Nation | John Manton | 1,725 | 1.54 | +0.07 |
| Libertarian | Samuel Gunning | 1,376 | 1.23 | +0.94 |
| Trumpet of Patriots | Rosemary Mulligan | 1,162 | 1.04 | +1.04 |
| Total formal votes | | 112,202 | 94.40 | −1.69 |
| Informal votes | | 6,656 | 5.60 | +1.69 |
| Turnout | | 118,858 | 93.69 | +1.11 |
Notional two-party-preferred count
| Liberal | Gisele Kapterian | 61,658 | 54.95 | −1.18 |
| Labor | Louise McCallum | 50,544 | 45.05 | +1.18 |
Two-candidate-preferred result
| Independent | Nicolette Boele | 56,114 | 50.01 | +3.41 |
| Liberal | Gisele Kapterian | 56,088 | 49.99 | −3.41 |
| Independent gain from Liberal | | Swing | +3.41 | |

The AEC applied a mathematical equation to approximate the Two-Party Preferred (TPP) figure for Bradfield, as they were unable to conduct a 'scrutiny-for-information' count to get the TPP figure due to the potential for a petition to the Court of Disputed Returns regarding the Bradfield result. The Liberals launched then withdrew a court challenge to the result. Analysis by independent psephologists suggests that the actual TPP figure may favour Labor over the Liberals.
