= Paul Fletcher (politician) =

Australian politician (born 1965)

The Honourable Paul Fletcher
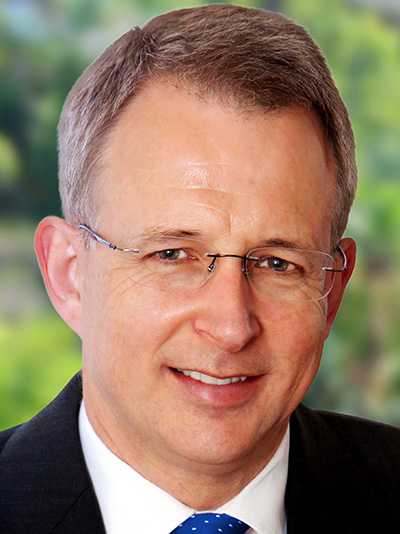
- Official portrait, 2013

Manager of Opposition Business in the House
- In office 5 June 2022 – 25 January 2025
- Deputy: Kevin Hogan
- Leader: Peter Dutton
- Preceded by: Tony Burke
- Succeeded by: Michael Sukkar

Minister for Communications, Urban Infrastructure, Cities and the Arts
- In office 22 December 2020 – 23 May 2022
- Prime Minister: Scott Morrison
- Preceded by: Himself (Communications and Arts); Alan Tudge (Cities and Urban Infrastructure)
- Succeeded by: Michelle Rowland (Communications); Tony Burke (Arts); Catherine King (Infrastrtucture)

Minister for Communications, Cyber Safety and the Arts
- In office 29 May 2019 – 22 December 2020
- Prime Minister: Scott Morrison
- Preceded by: Mitch Fifield
- Succeeded by: Himself (Communications and the Arts); Jane Hume (Digital Economy)

Minister for Families and Social Services
- In office 28 August 2018 – 29 May 2019
- Prime Minister: Scott Morrison
- Preceded by: Dan Tehan
- Succeeded by: Anne Ruston

Minister for Urban Infrastructure (Minister for Cities and Urban Infrastructure 2017–2018)
- In office 19 July 2016 – 27 August 2018
- Prime Minister: Malcolm Turnbull; Scott Morrison
- Preceded by: Jamie Briggs
- Succeeded by: Alan Tudge

Minister for Territories, Local Government and Major Projects
- In office 21 September 2015 – 19 July 2016
- Prime Minister: Malcolm Turnbull
- Preceded by: Warren Truss (Infrastructure and Regional Development)
- Succeeded by: Fiona Nash (Local Government and Territories)

Member of the Australian Parliament for Bradfield
- In office 5 December 2009 – 28 March 2025
- Preceded by: Brendan Nelson
- Succeeded by: Nicolette Boele

Personal details
- Born: Paul William Fletcher; 16 January 1965 (age 61) Devizes, Wiltshire, England
- Citizenship: Australian; British (1965–2009)
- Party: Liberal Party of Australia
- Spouse: Manuela Zappacosta
- Children: 2
- Education: University of Sydney; Columbia Business School
- Website: www.paulfletcher.com.au

Paul William Fletcher (born 16 January 1965) is an Australian retired politician. He is a member of the Liberal Party and was a member of the House of Representatives from 2009 to 2025, representing the New South Wales division of Bradfield. He held ministerial office in the Turnbull and Morrison governments from 2015 to 2022.

Fletcher was a management consultant, lawyer and corporate executive before entering politics. He was first elected to parliament at the 2009 Bradfield by-election. He served as a parliamentary secretary in the Abbott government from 2013 to 2015, before being promoted to the ministry by Malcolm Turnbull. Fletcher subsequently served as Minister for Major Projects, Territories, and Local Government (2015–2016), Urban Infrastructure and Cities (2016–2018), Families and Social Services (2018–2019), and Communications, Urban Infrastructure, Cities and the Arts (2019–2022). He was appointed to cabinet in 2018 by Scott Morrison. After the Coalition's defeat at the 2022 election he was named Manager of Opposition Business in the House. He announced his retirement in December 2024.

== Early life ==
Fletcher was born in Devizes, Wiltshire, England, the son of Clive and Mary Fletcher. His father was a professor of computational engineering. He arrived in Australia with his family at the age of two, and held British citizenship until 2009 when he renounced it to stand for parliament.

Fletcher grew up in the eastern suburbs of Sydney, where he was the dux of Sydney Grammar School in 1982. He subsequently attended the University of Sydney, graduating with first-class honours in economics and laws. At university he co-wrote two plays, titled The Fax of Life and Annually Fixated. In 1993, Fletcher was awarded a Fulbright Scholarship to go to Columbia University's Graduate School of Business in New York City, where he completed a Master of Business Administration degree.

Fletcher was one of seven Liberal MPs in the 46th Parliament of Australia who obtained degrees at an Oxbridge or Ivy League university, the others being Alan Tudge, Angus Taylor, Andrew Laming, Dave Sharma, Greg Hunt and Josh Frydenberg.

== Professional career ==
In his early career, Fletcher worked as a management consultant, a corporate lawyer for Mallesons Stephen Jaques, and a corporate strategist for TNT Limited. From 1996 to 2000, he worked as chief of staff to Minister for Communications Richard Alston, a Liberal Party politician. Fletcher joined Optus in 2000 and worked as director of corporate and regulatory affairs until 2008. He was a staunch opponent of Telstra, accusing the latter company of being a monopoly.

After leaving Optus, Fletcher founded Fletchergroup Advisers, a strategy consultancy focusing on the communications industry. He also wrote a book entitled Wired Brown Land? Telstra's Battle for Broadband that was published in 2009, discussing Telstra's bid to operate the Australian Government's proposed National Broadband Network.

== Political career ==
Fletcher joined the Young Liberals at the age of 16. In 2009, he won preselection from a field of 17 people to be the Liberal Party candidate at the 2009 Bradfield by-election, following the retirement of former Liberal leader Brendan Nelson. Bradfield, a seat located in the North Shore of Sydney, has been held continuously by the Liberal Party since its creation in 1949, and is one of the safest Liberal Party seats in Parliament. He was required to renounce his dual British citizenship before entering Parliament, as required by Section 44 of the Constitution of Australia. Fletcher had previously unsuccessfully sought Liberal Party pre-selection in the Division of Cook in 2007.

Under the Abbott government, Fletcher was the Parliamentary Secretary to the Minister for Communications. In September 2015 Fletcher was appointed as the Minister for Major Projects, Territories, and Local Government in the Turnbull government. Fletcher served as the Minister for Urban Infrastructure from July 2016 until he was promoted to Cabinet in 2018.

Fletcher is a member of the Moderate/Modern Liberal faction of the Liberal Party.

In June 2022 he was appointed Manager of Opposition Business in the House. He also serves as Shadow Minister for Government Services and the Digital Economy, as well as Shadow Minister for Science and the Arts.

On 10 December 2024, Fletcher announced that he would not seek re-election at the 2025 Australian federal election.

== Personal life ==
Fletcher is married to jeweller Manuela Zappacosta and they have one son, and they live with her son from a previous marriage.

Parliament of Australia
Preceded by Brendan Nelson	Member for Bradfield; 2009–2025	Succeeded by Nicolette Boele
Political offices
New ministerial post	Minister for Territories, Local Government and Major Projects; 2015–2016	Succeeded by Fiona Nash as Minister for Local Government and Territories
Preceded by Darren Chester as Minister for Infrastructure and Transport	Minister for Urban Infrastructure; 2016–2018	Succeeded by Alan Tudge
Vacant Title last held by Jamie Briggs as Minister for Cities and the Built Environment	Minister for Cities; 2017–2018	Succeeded by Alan Tudge
Preceded by Dan Tehan as Minister for Social Services	Minister for Families and Social Services; 2018–2019	Succeeded by Anne Ruston
Preceded by Mitch Fifield	Minister for Communications and the Arts; 2019–2022	Succeeded by Michelle Rowland as Minister for Communications
Preceded by Mitch Fifield	Minister for Communications and the Arts; 2019–2022	Succeeded by Tony Burke as Minister for the Arts
Vacant Title last held by Angus Taylor as Minister for Law Enforcement and Cybersecurity	Minister for Cyber Safety; 2019–2020	Succeeded by Jane Hume as Minister for Superannuation, Financial Services and the Digital Economy
Preceded by Alan Tudge as Minister for Population, Cities and Urban Infrastructure	Minister for Urban Infrastructure and Cities; 2020–2022	Succeeded by Catherine King as Minister for Infrastructure, Regional Development and Local Government
