= List of Australian Senate appointments =

This is a list of appointments to the Australian Senate, which is the upper house of the Parliament of Australia, filling casual vacancies, from the Senate's creation in 1901 until the present day. There is a second list of invalid elections and appointments to the Senate.

== Appointment procedures ==
=== States ===
Section 15 of the Australian Constitution requires the parliament of the relevant state to choose a replacement. This is done in a joint sitting of the upper and lower house (except for Queensland, which has a unicameral parliament). In the event that the state parliament is not in session, the Governor of the state (acting on the advice of the state's executive council) may appoint a replacement senator, but such an appointment lapses if it is not confirmed by a joint sitting of the parliament within 14 days after the beginning of the next session.

Prior to 29 July 1977, the filing of casual vacancies was complex. While senators were elected for a six-year term, people appointed to a casual vacancy only held office until the earlier of the next election for the House of Representatives or the Senate, at which the vacancy would be filled by the electors of the relevant state. It was also an established convention that the state parliament choose (or the governor appoint) a replacement from the same political party as their predecessor, however this convention was not always followed. (Note: Of the 66 appointments to 1977, 12 (18%) were from a different party, John Shannon (1912), John Earle (1917); Edward Mulcahy (1919), John MacDonald (1922), Sir Henry Barwell (1925), John Verran (1927), Harry Kneebone (1931), Patrick Mooney (1931), Philip McBride (1937), Alexander Fraser (1946), Cleaver Bunton (1975), and Albert Field, (1975).)

As a result of the 1977 referendum:

- a state legislature must replace a senator with a member of the same political party, and
- the new senator's term continues until the end of the original senator's term.

=== Territories ===
Replacement senators for the Australian Capital Territory (ACT) or the Northern Territory (NT) are chosen by the relevant territory legislature, under s.44 of the Commonwealth Electoral Act 1918. Where the legislature is not in session, the choice is made by the Administrator of the NT (acting on the advice of the territory's executive council) or the Chief Minister of the ACT. The procedure has been in use in the NT since 1980 and the ACT since 1989.

Between 1980 and 1989, replacement senators in the ACT were chosen by a joint sitting of both houses of the Federal Parliament, under s.9 of the Senate (Representation of Territories) Act 1973. Prior to 1980, replacement senators in the ACT or the NT were to be elected in a by-election, though this never occurred.

== List of appointments to the Senate ==
48th Parliament (2025–2028)
| State | Date | Incumbent | Party | Appointee | Party | Cause |
| Tasmania | 20 August 2026 | Peter Whish-Wilson | Greens | Vanessa Bleyer | Greens | Resignation |
| Tasmania | 13 August 2026 | Wendy Askew | Liberal | Chris Gatenby | Liberal | Resignation |
| New South Wales | 18 September 2025 | Warwick Stacey | One Nation | Sean Bell | One Nation | Resignation |
47th Parliament (2022–2025)
| State | Date | Incumbent | Party | Appointee | Party | Cause |
| Tasmania (Note: Occurred after an election but before the new Senate was sworn in.) | 27 May 2025 | Anne Urquhart | Labor | Josh Dolega | Labor | Resignation |
| South Australia | 6 February 2025 | Simon Birmingham | Liberal | Leah Blyth | Liberal | Resignation |
| Victoria | 29 May 2024 | Linda White | Labor | Lisa Darmanin | Labor | Death |
| Victoria | 1 May 2024 | Janet Rice | Greens | Steph Hodgins-May | Greens | Resignation |
| Western Australia | 1 February 2024 | Pat Dodson | Labor | Varun Ghosh | Labor | Resignation |
| New South Wales | 30 November 2023 | Marise Payne | Liberal | Dave Sharma | Liberal | Resignation |
| New South Wales | 31 May 2023 | Jim Molan | Liberal | Maria Kovacic | Liberal | Death |
46th Parliament (2019–2022)
| State | Date | Incumbent | Party | Appointee | Party | Cause |
| Western Australia | 18 May 2022 | Ben Small | Liberal | Ben Small | Liberal | Resignation (Note: Small resigned from the Senate after he discovered that he held dual Australian-New Zealand dual citizenship. After renouncing his New Zealand citizenship, he was reappointed to the Senate casual vacancy caused by his own resignation.) |
| Victoria | 6 April 2022 | Kimberley Kitching | Labor | Jana Stewart | Labor | Death |
| Victoria | 2 December 2021 | Scott Ryan | Liberal | Greg Mirabella | Liberal | Resignation |
| South Australia | 21 September 2021 | Alex Gallacher | Labor | Karen Grogan | Labor | Death |
| Western Australia | 14 September 2021 | Rachel Siewert | Greens | Dorinda Cox | Greens | Resignation |
| Western Australia | 25 November 2020 | Mathias Cormann | Liberal | Ben Small | Liberal | Resignation |
| Victoria | 4 September 2020 | Richard Di Natale | Greens | Lidia Thorpe | Greens | Resignation |
| South Australia | 6 February 2020 | Cory Bernardi | Independent (Note: Bernardi was elected as a member of the Liberal Party before the start of the 45th Parliament, but resigned from the party and founded the Australian Conservatives during his term. Prior to the start of the 46th Parliament, the Australian Conservatives was dissolved and Bernardi became an independent.) | Andrew McLachlan | Liberal | Resignation |
| New South Wales | 14 November 2019 | Arthur Sinodinos | Liberal | Jim Molan | Liberal | Resignation |
| Victoria | 11 September 2019 | Mitch Fifield | Liberal | Sarah Henderson | Liberal | Resignation |
45th Parliament (2016–2019)
| State | Date | Incumbent | Party | Appointee | Party | Cause |
| New South Wales | 20 March 2019 | David Leyonhjelm | Liberal Democrats | Duncan Spender | Liberal Democrats | Resignation |
| Tasmania | 6 March 2019 | David Bushby | Liberal | Wendy Askew | Liberal | Resignation |
| Victoria | 6 March 2019 | Jacinta Collins | Labor | Raff Ciccone | Labor | Resignation |
| Queensland | 6 September 2018 | Andrew Bartlett | Greens | Larissa Waters | Greens | Resignation |
| New South Wales | 15 August 2018 | Lee Rhiannon | Greens | Mehreen Faruqi | Greens | Resignation |
| Queensland | 21 March 2018 | George Brandis | LNP | Amanda Stoker | LNP | Resignation |
| New South Wales | 14 February 2018 | Sam Dastyari | Labor | Kristina Keneally | Labor | Resignation |
| South Australia | 14 November 2017 | Nick Xenophon | Xenophon | Rex Patrick | Xenophon | Resignation |
| Western Australia | 16 August 2017 | Chris Back | Liberal | Slade Brockman | Liberal | Resignation |
| Victoria | 25 October 2016 | Stephen Conroy | Labor | Kimberley Kitching | Labor | Resignation |
44th Parliament (2014–2016)
| State | Date | Incumbent | Party | Appointee | Party | Cause |
| Western Australia | 2 May 2016 | Joe Bullock | Labor | Pat Dodson | Labor | Resignation |
| Victoria | 9 March 2016 | Michael Ronaldson | Liberal | James Paterson | Liberal | Resignation |
| South Australia | 22 September 2015 | Penny Wright | Greens | Robert Simms | Greens | Resignation |
| Tasmania | 19 August 2015 | Christine Milne | Greens | Nick McKim | Greens | Resignation |
| Queensland | 21 May 2015 | Brett Mason | LNP | Joanna Lindgren | LNP | Resignation |
| New South Wales | 6 May 2015 | John Faulkner | Labor | Jenny McAllister | Labor | Resignation |
| Australian Capital Territory | 25 March 2015 | Kate Lundy | Labor | Katy Gallagher | Labor | Resignation |
| New South Wales (Note: Carr resigned one month after the 2013 federal election where he was re-elected for a new Senate term that was due to start on 1 July 2014. His resignation resulted in a vacancy in his current term expiring on 30 June 2014 and his new term due to start on 1 July 2014. O'Neill was appointed to fill both casual vacancies in two separate joint sittings of the NSW Parliament on 13 November 2013 and 2 July 2014.) | 2 July 2014 | Bob Carr | Labor | Deborah O'Neill | Labor | Resignation |
43rd Parliament (2011–2014)
| State | Date | Incumbent | Party | Appointee | Party | Cause |
| Queensland | 11 February 2014 | Barnaby Joyce | LNP | Barry O'Sullivan | LNP | Resignation |
| New South Wales | 13 November 2013 | Bob Carr | Labor | Deborah O'Neill | Labor | Resignation |
| Victoria | 21 August 2013 | David Feeney | Labor | Mehmet Tillem | Labor | Resignation |
| New South Wales | 21 August 2013 | Matt Thistlethwaite | Labor | Sam Dastyari | Labor | Resignation |
| Western Australia | 15 May 2013 | Chris Evans | Labor | Sue Lines | Labor | Resignation |
| South Australia | 5 September 2012 | Mary Jo Fisher | Liberal | Anne Ruston | Liberal | Resignation |
| Tasmania | 20 June 2012 | Bob Brown | Greens | Peter Whish-Wilson | Greens | Resignation |
| Tasmania | 20 June 2012 | Nick Sherry | Labor | Lin Thorp | Labor | Resignation |
| Western Australia | 2 May 2012 | Judith Adams | Liberal | Dean Smith | Liberal | Death |
| New South Wales | 6 March 2012 | Mark Arbib | Labor | Bob Carr | Labor | Resignation |
| New South Wales | 13 October 2011 | Helen Coonan | Liberal | Arthur Sinodinos | Liberal | Resignation |
42nd Parliament (2008–2011)
| State | Date | Incumbent | Party | Appointee | Party | Cause |
| Western Australia | 12 March 2009 | Chris Ellison | Liberal | Chris Back | Liberal | Resignation |
41st Parliament (2005–2008)
| State | Date | Incumbent | Party | Appointee | Party | Cause |
| Victoria | 8 May 2008 | Robert Ray | Labor | Jacinta Collins | Labor | Resignation |
| Tasmania | 30 August 2007 | Paul Calvert | Liberal | David Bushby | Liberal | Resignation |
| Western Australia | 19 June 2007 | Ian Campbell | Liberal | Mathias Cormann | Liberal | Resignation |
| South Australia | 6 June 2007 | Amanda Vanstone | Liberal | Mary Jo Fisher | Liberal | Resignation |
| South Australia | 3 May 2007 | Jeannie Ferris | Liberal | Simon Birmingham | Liberal | Death |
| Queensland | 19 April 2007 | Santo Santoro | Liberal | Sue Boyce | Liberal | Resignation |
| South Australia | 4 May 2006 | Robert Hill | Liberal | Cory Bernardi | Liberal | Resignation |
| Tasmania | 25 August 2005 | Sue Mackay | Labor | Carol Brown | Labor | Resignation |
40th Parliament (2002–2005)
| State | Date | Incumbent | Party | Appointee | Party | Cause |
| New South Wales | 5 May 2005 | John Tierney | Liberal | Concetta Fierravanti-Wells | Liberal | Resignation |
| Victoria | 31 March 2004 | Richard Alston | Liberal | Mitch Fifield | Liberal | Resignation |
| Australian Capital Territory | 18 February 2003 | Margaret Reid | Liberal | Gary Humphries | Liberal | Resignation |
| Queensland | 29 October 2002 | John Herron | Liberal | Santo Santoro | Liberal | Resignation |
39th Parliament (1999–2002)
| State | Date | Incumbent | Party | Appointee | Party | Cause |
| Tasmania | 26 February 2002 | Brian Gibson | Liberal | Guy Barnett | Liberal | Resignation |
| Tasmania | 4 February 2002 | Jocelyn Newman | Liberal | Richard Colbeck | Liberal | Resignation |
| Queensland | 31 July 2001 | John Woodley | Democrats | John Cherry | Democrats | Resignation |
| South Australia | 14 September 2000 | John Quirke | Labor | Geoff Buckland | Labor | Resignation |
| Queensland | 16 May 2000 | Warwick Parer | Liberal | George Brandis | Liberal | Resignation |
| New South Wales | 4 May 2000 | David Brownhill | National | Sandy Macdonald | National | Resignation |
38th Parliament (1996–1999)
| State | Date | Incumbent | Party | Appointee | Party | Cause |
| New South Wales | 14 October 1998 | Belinda Neal | Labor | Steve Hutchins | Labor | Resignation |
| Northern Territory | 16 June 1998 | Bob Collins | Labor | Trish Crossin | Labor | Resignation |
| Queensland | 30 October 1997 | Cheryl Kernot | Democrats | Andrew Bartlett | Democrats | Resignation |
| South Australia | 18 September 1997 | Dominic Foreman | Labor | John Quirke | Labor | Resignation |
| New South Wales | 17 September 1997 | Bruce Childs | Labor | George Campbell | Labor | Resignation |
| Western Australia | 19 May 1997 | John Panizza | Liberal | Ross Lightfoot | Liberal | Death |
| Victoria | 13 May 1997 | Jim Short | Liberal | Karen Synon | Liberal | Resignation |
| New South Wales | 9 April 1997 | Bob Woods | Liberal | Marise Payne | Liberal | Resignation |
| New South Wales | 18 September 1996 | Michael Baume | Liberal | Bill Heffernan | Liberal | Resignation |
| Tasmania | 5 September 1996 | John Coates | Labor | Kerry O'Brien | Labor | Resignation |
| South Australia | 24 July 1996 | Jeannie Ferris | Liberal | Jeannie Ferris | Liberal | Resignation (eligibility) (Note: In the period between the election and her term formally commencing, Ferris worked as a member of parliamentary staff. In order to avoid any argument that she was disqualified for holding "an office of profit under the crown", Ferris resigned and was re-appointed to the vacancy.) |
37th Parliament (1993–1996)
| State | Date | Incumbent | Party | Appointee | Party | Cause |
| Victoria | 30 April 1996 | Gareth Evans | Labor | Stephen Conroy | Labor | Resignation |
| Tasmania | 8 March 1996 | John Devereux | Labor/Independent (Note: Elected as a member of the ALP, but resigned from the party during his term.) | Sue Mackay | Labor | Resignation |
| South Australia | 29 November 1995 | John Coulter | Democrats | Natasha Stott Despoja | Democrats | Resignation |
| New South Wales | 24 May 1995 | Stephen Loosley | Labor | Tom Wheelwright | Labor | Resignation |
| Victoria | 3 May 1995 | Olive Zakharov | Labor | Jacinta Collins | Labor | Death |
| New South Wales | 10 May 1994 | Graham Richardson | Labor | Michael Forshaw | Labor | Resignation |
| New South Wales | 8 March 1994 | Bronwyn Bishop | Liberal | Bob Woods | Liberal | Resignation |
| New South Wales | 8 March 1994 | Kerry Sibraa | Labor | Belinda Neal | Labor | Resignation |
| Tasmania | 22 February 1994 | Brian Archer | Liberal | Eric Abetz | Liberal | Resignation |
| Tasmania | 24 August 1993 | Michael Tate | Labor | Kay Denman | Labor | Resignation |
36th Parliament (1990–1993)
| State | Date | Incumbent | Party | Appointee | Party | Cause |
| Victoria | 28 April 1993 | John Button | Labor | Kim Carr | Labor | Resignation |
| South Australia | 26 May 1992 | John Olsen | Liberal | Alan Ferguson | Liberal | Resignation |
| Western Australia | 12 March 1992 | Jo Vallentine | Greens WA | Christabel Chamarette | Greens WA | Resignation |
| New South Wales | 29 August 1991 | Paul McLean | Democrats | Karin Sowada | Democrats | Resignation |
| New South Wales | 11 February 1991 | Peter Baume | Liberal | John Tierney | Liberal | Resignation |
35th Parliament (1987–1990)
| State | Date | Incumbent | Party | Appointee | Party | Cause |
| Western Australia | 16 May 1990 | Fred Chaney | Liberal | Ian Campbell | Liberal | Resignation |
| Queensland | 8 May 1990 | John Stone | National | Bill O'Chee | National | Resignation |
| South Australia | 7 May 1990 | Tony Messner | Liberal | John Olsen | Liberal | Resignation |
| South Australia | 4 April 1990 | Janine Haines | Democrats | Meg Lees | Democrats | Resignation |
| Tasmania | 7 March 1990 | Norm Sanders | Democrats | Robert Bell | Democrats | Resignation |
| New South Wales | 4 April 1989 | Arthur Gietzelt | Labor | John Faulkner | Labor | Resignation |
| Australian Capital Territory | 16 February 1988 | Susan Ryan | Labor | Bob McMullan | Labor | Resignation |
34th Parliament (1985–1987)
| State | Date | Incumbent | Party | Appointee | Party | Cause |
| New South Wales | 11 February 1987 | Doug McClelland | Labor | Sue West | Labor | Resignation |
| Victoria | 26 August 1986 | Don Chipp | Democrats | Janet Powell | Democrats | Resignation |
| Victoria | 7 May 1986 | Alan Missen | Liberal | Richard Alston | Liberal | Death |
| Tasmania | 13 March 1986 | Peter Rae | Liberal | Jocelyn Newman | Liberal | Resignation |
33rd Parliament (1983–1985)
| State | Date | Incumbent | Party | Appointee | Party | Cause |
| Queensland | 22 November 1984 | Kathy Martin | Liberal | Warwick Parer | Liberal | Resignation |
32nd Parliament (1981–1983)
No appointments made
31st Parliament (1978–1981)
| State | Date | Incumbent | Party | Appointee | Party | Cause |
| Australian Capital Territory | 5 May 1981 | John Knight | Liberal | Margaret Reid | Liberal | Death |
| Queensland | 12 March 1981 | Glen Sheil | NCP | Florence Bjelke-Petersen | NCP | Resignation |
| Western Australia | 11 March 1981 | Allan Rocher | Liberal | John Martyr | Liberal | Resignation |
| Tasmania | 15 October 1980 | Ken Wriedt | Labor | Jean Hearn | Labor | Resignation |
| Victoria | 11 March 1980 | James Webster | NCP | Laurence Neal | NCP | Resignation |
| New South Wales | 9 August 1978 | Jim McClelland | Labor | Kerry Sibraa | Labor | Resignation |
| New South Wales | 26 July 1978 | Sir Robert Cotton | Liberal | Chris Puplick | Liberal | Resignation |
30th Parliament (1975–1978)
| State | Date | Incumbent | Party | Appointee | Party | Cause |
| South Australia | 14 December 1977 | Steele Hall | Liberal Movement/Liberal (Note: Elected as a member of the Liberal Movement, but joined the Liberal party on the break-up of the Liberal Movement.) | Janine Haines | Democrats (Note: Haines had also been on the Liberal Movement ticket with Hall in 1974 however she had joined the Democrats on the break-up of the Liberal Movement.) | Resignation |
| Victoria | 7 December 1976 | Ivor Greenwood | Liberal | Austin Lewis | Liberal | Death |
29th Parliament (1974–1975)
| State | Date | Incumbent | Party | Appointee | Party | Cause |
| Queensland | 3 September 1975 | Bertie Milliner | Labor | Albert Field | Independent | Death |
| New South Wales | 27 February 1975 | Lionel Murphy | Labor | Cleaver Bunton | Independent | Resignation |
27th/28th Parliament (1971–1974)
| State | Date | Incumbent | Party | Appointee | Party | Cause |
| Western Australia | 16 January 1974 | Edgar Prowse | Country | David Reid | Country | Resignation |
26th Parliament (1968–1971)
| State | Date | Incumbent | Party | Appointee | Party | Cause |
| Queensland | 11 June 1971 | Dame Annabelle Rankin | Liberal | Neville Bonner (Note: First Indigenous Australian to be a member of the Parliament of Australia) | Liberal | Resignation |
| New South Wales | 16 March 1971 | James Ormonde | Labor | Jim McClelland | Labor | Death |
| New South Wales | 6 August 1970 | Colin McKellar | Country | Douglas Scott | Country | Death |
| Victoria | 19 November 1969 | Sam Cohen | Labor | Bill Brown | Labor | Death |
| South Australia | 23 May 1969 | Keith Laught | Liberal | Martin Cameron | Liberal | Death |
25th Parliament (1965–1968)
| State | Date | Incumbent | Party | Appointee | Party | Cause |
| Victoria | 21 February 1968 | John Gorton | Liberal | Ivor Greenwood | Liberal | Resignation |
| South Australia | 2 November 1967 | Clive Hannaford | Liberal/Independent (Note: Elected as a member of Liberal Party, but quit during his term to become an independent.) | Condor Laucke | Liberal | Death |
| Victoria | 26 October 1966 | Charles Sandford | Labor | George Poyser | Labor | Death |
| Queensland | 14 April 1966 | Bob Sherrington | Liberal | Bill Heatley | Liberal | Death |
| Western Australia | 17 February 1966 | Sir Shane Paltridge | Liberal | Reg Withers | Liberal | Death |
| New South Wales | 4 August 1965 | Sir William Spooner | Liberal | Bob Cotton | Liberal | Resignation |
24th Parliament (1962–1965)
| State | Date | Incumbent | Party | Appointee | Party | Cause |
| Victoria | 9 December 1964 | Harrie Wade | Country | James Webster | Country | Death |
| Western Australia | 26 November 1964 | Seddon Vincent | Liberal | Peter Sim | Liberal | Death |
| Queensland | 9 October 1962 | Max Poulter | Labor | George Whiteside | Labor | Death |
23rd Parliament (1959–1962)
| State | Date | Incumbent | Party | Appointee | Party | Cause |
| South Australia | 8 February 1962 | Nancy Buttfield | Liberal | Gordon Davidson | Liberal | Resignation (Note: Liberal Senator Rex Pearson died on 11 September 1961; Liberal member Gordon Davidson was appointed to fill the ensuing vacancy on 28 September. He did not stand at the 9 December 1961 election and his position was won by Liberal candidate Nancy Buttfield. In order to take up the seat with a term finishing on 30 June 1965, Buttfield resigned her pre-existing seat won at the 1955 election and scheduled to expire on 30 June 1962; Davidson was appointed to that position on 8 February 1962.) |
| South Australia | 28 September 1961 | Rex Pearson | Liberal | Gordon Davidson | Liberal | Death |
22nd Parliament (1956–1959)
| State | Date | Incumbent | Party | Appointee | Party | Cause |
| Western Australia | 12 August 1958 | Harrie Seward | Country | Tom Drake-Brockman | Country | Death |
| New South Wales | 30 July 1958 | Bill Ashley | Labor | James Ormonde | Labor | Death |
| Victoria | 6 June 1957 | Jack Devlin | Labor | Charles Sandford | Labor | Death |
| Victoria | 28 August 1956 | John Spicer | Liberal | George Hannan | Liberal | Resignation |
21st Parliament (1953–1956)
| State | Date | Incumbent | Party | Appointee | Party | Cause |
| South Australia | 11 October 1955 | George McLeay | Liberal | Nancy Buttfield | Liberal | Death |
20th Parliament (1951–1953)
| State | Date | Incumbent | Party | Appointee | Party | Cause |
| Tasmania | 3 March 1953 | Jack Chamberlain | Liberal | John Marriott | Liberal | Death |
| Western Australia | 30 September 1952 | Edmund Piesse | Country | Bill Robinson | Country | Death |
| Western Australia | 7 February 1952 | Richard Nash | Labor | Joe Cooke | Labor | Death |
19th Parliament (1950–1951)
No appointments made
18th Parliament (1947–1950)
No appointments made
17th Parliament (1944–1947)
| State | Date | Incumbent | Party | Appointee | Party | Cause |
| Victoria | 15 May 1946 | Richard Keane | Labor | Alexander Fraser | Country | Death |
| South Australia | 10 October 1944 | Oliver Uppill | United Australia | Ted Mattner | United Australia | Resignation |
16th Parliament (1941–1944)
| State | Date | Incumbent | Party | Appointee | Party | Cause |
| Western Australia | 8 October 1942 | Bertie Johnston | Country | Charles Latham | Country | Death |
15th Parliament (1938–1941)
| State | Date | Incumbent | Party | Appointee | Party | Cause |
| Victoria | 12 July 1938 | John Barnes | Labor | Jim Sheehan | Labor | Death |
14th Parliament (1935–1938)
| State | Date | Incumbent | Party | Appointee | Party | Cause |
| South Australia | 21 October 1937 | Oliver Badman | Country | Philip McBride | UAP | Resignation |
| Queensland | 2 September 1937 | John MacDonald | Labor | Ben Courtice | Labor | Death |
| Western Australia | 19 August 1936 | William Carroll | Country | Thomas Marwick | Country | Death |
| New South Wales | 26 September 1935 | Lionel Courtenay | UAP | Guy Arkins | UAP | Death |
13th Parliament (1932–1935)
| State | Date | Incumbent | Party | Appointee | Party | Cause |
| Western Australia | 5 March 1935 | Sir Walter Kingsmill | UAP | Allan MacDonald | UAP | Death |
| Western Australia | 6 April 1933 | Sir Hal Colebatch | UAP | Herbert Collett | UAP | Resignation |
11th/12th Parliament (1929–1932)
| State | Date | Incumbent | Party | Appointee | Party | Cause |
| Tasmania | 3 March 1932 | James Ogden | UAP | Charles Grant | UAP | Death |
| New South Wales | 23 December 1931 | Walter Duncan | UAP | Patrick Mooney | Labor (NSW) | Resignation |
| Victoria | 12 May 1931 | Harold Elliott | UAP | Tom Brennan | UAP | Death |
| South Australia | 1 April 1931 | John Chapman | Country | Harry Kneebone | Labor | Death |
10th Parliament (1926–1929)
| State | Date | Incumbent | Party | Appointee | Party | Cause |
| Victoria | 18 December 1928 | David Andrew | Country | Richard Abbott | Country | Death |
| Queensland | 1 August 1928 | Thomas Givens | Nationalist | John MacDonald | Labor | Death |
| New South Wales | 5 June 1928 | John Grant | Labor | Albert Gardiner | Labor | Death |
| South Australia | 18 April 1928 | Sir Henry Barwell | Nationalist | Albert Robinson | Nationalist | Resignation |
| South Australia | 30 August 1927 | Charles McHugh | Labor | John Verran | Nationalist | Death |
9th Parliament (1923–1926)
| State | Date | Incumbent | Party | Appointee | Party | Cause |
| South Australia | 24 February 1926 | Benjamin Benny | Nationalist | Alexander McLachlan | Nationalist | Resignation |
| South Australia | 18 December 1925 | James O'Loghlin | Labor | Sir Henry Barwell | Nationalist | Death |
| Victoria | 25 August 1925 | Edward Russell | Nationalist | William Plain | Nationalist | Death |
| Tasmania | 29 July 1925 | George Foster | Nationalist | Charles Grant | Nationalist | Resignation |
| New South Wales | 1 April 1925 | Jack Power | Labor | William Gibbs | Labor | Death |
| New South Wales | 20 November 1924 | Allan McDougall | Labor | Jack Power | Labor | Death |
| Victoria | 22 July 1924 | Stephen Barker | Labor | Joseph Hannan | Labor | Death |
| New South Wales | 17 October 1923 | Edward Millen | Nationalist | Walter Massy-Greene | Nationalist | Death |
| Tasmania | 12 September 1923 | Thomas Bakhap | Nationalist | John Hayes | Nationalist | Death |
8th Parliament (1920–1923)
| State | Date | Incumbent | Party | Appointee | Party | Cause |
| Queensland | 26 May 1922 | John Adamson | Nationalist | John MacDonald | Labor | Death |
| New South Wales | 15 December 1921 | Herbert Pratten | Nationalist | Henry Garling | Nationalist | Resignation |
| South Australia | 9 August 1921 | Edward Vardon | Nationalist | Edward Vardon | Nationalist | Lapsed (Note: The appointment lapsed on 4 August due to lack of confirmation by the South Australian Parliament, but Vardon was reappointed.) |
| South Australia | 16 February 1921 | Robert Guthrie | Nationalist | Edward Vardon | Nationalist | Death |
7th Parliament (1917–1920)
| State | Date | Incumbent | Party | Appointee | Party | Cause |
| Tasmania | 15 January 1919 | James Long | Labor | Edward Mulcahy | Nationalist | Resignation |
6th Parliament (1914–1917)
| State | Date | Incumbent | Party | Appointee | Party | Cause |
| South Australia | 24 May 1917 | William Story | Nationalist | James Rowell | Nationalist | Resignation |
| Tasmania | 1 March 1917 | Rudolph Ready | Labor | John Earle | Nationalist | Resignation |
5th Parliament (1913–1914)
No appointments made
4th Parliament (1910–1913)
| State | Date | Incumbent | Party | Appointee | Party | Cause |
| South Australia | 31 July 1912 | William Russell | Labor | John Shannon | Liberal | Death |
3rd Parliament (1907–1910)
| State | Date | Incumbent | Party | Appointee | Party | Cause |
| South Australia | 11 July 1907 | Joseph Vardon | Anti-Socialist | James O'Loghlin | Labor | Election declared void (Note: The election of Anti-Socialist senator Joseph Vardon was declared void on 31 May 1907; on 11 July ALP member James O'Loghlin was appointed to replace him. This appointment was declared void on 20 December, and a supplemental election was held in 1908.) |
2nd Parliament (1904–1906)
No appointments made
1st Parliament (1901–1903)
| State | Date | Incumbent | Party | Appointee | Party | Cause |
| New South Wales | 8 October 1903 | Richard O'Connor | Protectionist | Charles Mackellar | Protectionist | Resignation |
| Western Australia | 20 May 1903 | Norman Ewing | Free Trade | Henry Saunders | Free Trade | Resignation |
| Victoria | 21 January 1903 | Sir Frederick Sargood | Free Trade | Robert Reid | Free Trade | Death |

== List of invalid elections and appointments to the Senate ==
This is a list of people who have been declared to have been elected or appointed to the Australian Senate that the High Court, sitting as the Court of Disputed Returns, has subsequently declared to be ineligible. Some of these have actually sat in the Senate and participated in proceedings; however, the High Court has held that their presence did not invalidate the proceedings of the Senate.

| State | Date | Person | Party | Replacement | Party | Cause |
|---|---|---|---|---|---|---|
| Australian Capital Territory | 23 May 2018 | Katy Gallagher | Labor | David Smith | Labor | Citizen of foreign power. (Note: On 27 October 2017 as part of the 2017 Australian parliamentary eligibility crisis, Scott Ludlam, Malcolm Roberts, Fiona Nash and Larissa Waters were held to be "incapable of being chosen" as senators as they were dual citizens. Ludlam resigned on 14 July and Waters resigned on 18 July while Nash and Roberts continued to sit until the High Court decision. The date reflects when each was first elected. Three of the seats were filled by a recount, with the replacements appointed by the High Court on 10 November. Subsequently Jacqui Lambie, Stephen Parry and Skye Kakoschke-Moore were also found ineligible, and were replaced in February 2018. Katy Gallagher was later also found ineligible.) |
| South Australia | 16 February 2018 | Skye Kakoschke-Moore | Nick Xenophon Team | Tim Storer | Nick Xenophon Team/Independent | Citizen of foreign power. |
| Tasmania | 9 February 2018 | Stephen Parry | Liberal | Richard Colbeck | Liberal | Citizen of foreign power. |
| Tasmania | 9 February 2018 | Jacqui Lambie | Jacqui Lambie Network | Steve Martin | Independent | Citizen of foreign power. |
| New South Wales | 22 December 2017 | Fiona Nash | National | Jim Molan | Liberal | Citizen of foreign power. |
| Queensland | 10 November 2017 | Malcolm Roberts | One Nation | Fraser Anning | One Nation/Independent | Citizen of foreign power. |
| Queensland | 10 November 2017 | Larissa Waters | Greens | Andrew Bartlett | Greens | Citizen of foreign power. |
| Western Australia | 10 November 2017 | Scott Ludlam | Greens | Jordon Steele-John | Greens | Citizen of foreign power. |
| South Australia | 19 April 2017 | Bob Day | Family First | Lucy Gichuhi | Family First | Indirect pecuniary interest (Note: South Australian Family First Senator Bob Day resigned on 1 November 2016. On 5 April 2017 the High Court held that Day was "incapable of being chosen" or sitting as a Senator since February 2016 as he had an indirect interest in an agreement with the Commonwealth. Day's seat was filled by Lucy Gichuhi in a recount. Day sat in the Senate between February and 1 November 2016.) |
| Western Australia | 27 March 2017 | Rod Culleton | One Nation/Independent (Note: Rod Culleton was elected as a member of One Nation, but announced his resignation from the party on 18 December 2016. The President of the Senate declared his seat vacant on 11 January 2017 due to his bankruptcy. On 3 February the High Court declared that at the time of the 2016 election he was subject to being sentenced to imprisonment for up to two years and therefore he had never been validly elected. Culleton sat in the Senate between 2 July and 23 December 2016.) | Peter Georgiou | One Nation | Awaiting sentence on a criminal charge. |
| Western Australia | 1 July 2014 | Wayne Dropulich (Note: The election was declared void before the commencement of the Senate term) | Sports | Zhenya Wang | Palmer United Party | Entire election declared void. (Note: The entire half-Senate election for WA was declared void by the High Court because 1,375 ballot papers were lost during an official recount. Wayne Dropulich was the only candidate who was unsuccessful at the special election in 2014, the seat taken by Zhenya Wang.) |
| Queensland | 1 July 1999 | Heather Hill | One Nation | Len Harris | One Nation | Citizen of foreign power. (Note: Heather Hill was a dual citizen of the United Kingdom and Australia, and the High Court declared she was disqualified from election as the citizen of a "foreign power".) |
| New South Wales | 21 July 1988 | Robert Wood | NDP | Irina Dunn | NDP/Independent (Note: Robert Wood was a citizen of the United Kingdom, resident in Australia, however he had never obtained Australian citizenship. The High Court declared as he was not an Australian citizen Wood was disqualified from election. Wood sat in the Senate between 1 July 1987 and 12 May 1988. Irina Dunn was declared elected on a recount and was expelled from the NDP because she did not resign to allow Wood to be re-appointed.) | Not Australian citizen. |
| South Australia | 15 February 1908 | James O'Loghlin | Labour | Joseph Vardon | Anti-Socialist | Appointment declared void. (Note: The election of Anti-Socialist senator Joseph Vardon was declared void on 31 May 1907; on 11 July ALP member James O'Loghlin was appointed to replace him. This appointment was declared void on 20 December, and a supplemental election was held in 1908 which was won by Vardon.) |
| South Australia | 11 July 1907 | Joseph Vardon | Anti-Socialist | James O'Loghlin | Labour | Election declared void. |

== See also ==
- Casual vacancies in the Australian Parliament
