= 2013 Australian Senate election =

2013 Australian Senate elections
- 7 September 2013

40 of the 76 seats in the Australian Senate 39 seats needed for a majority
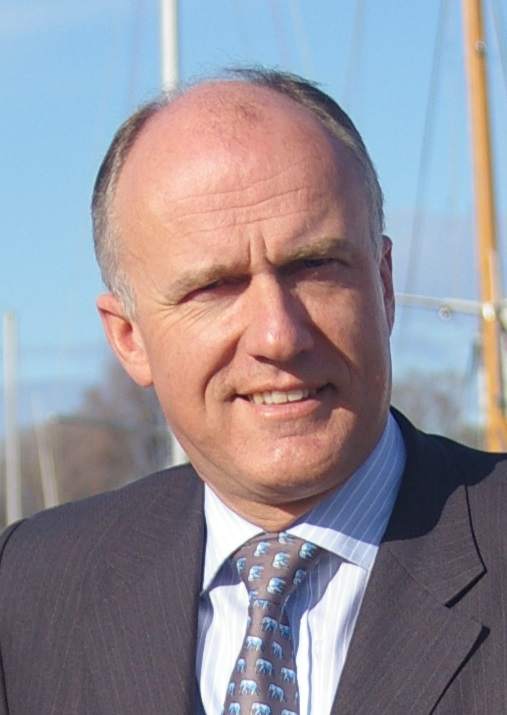

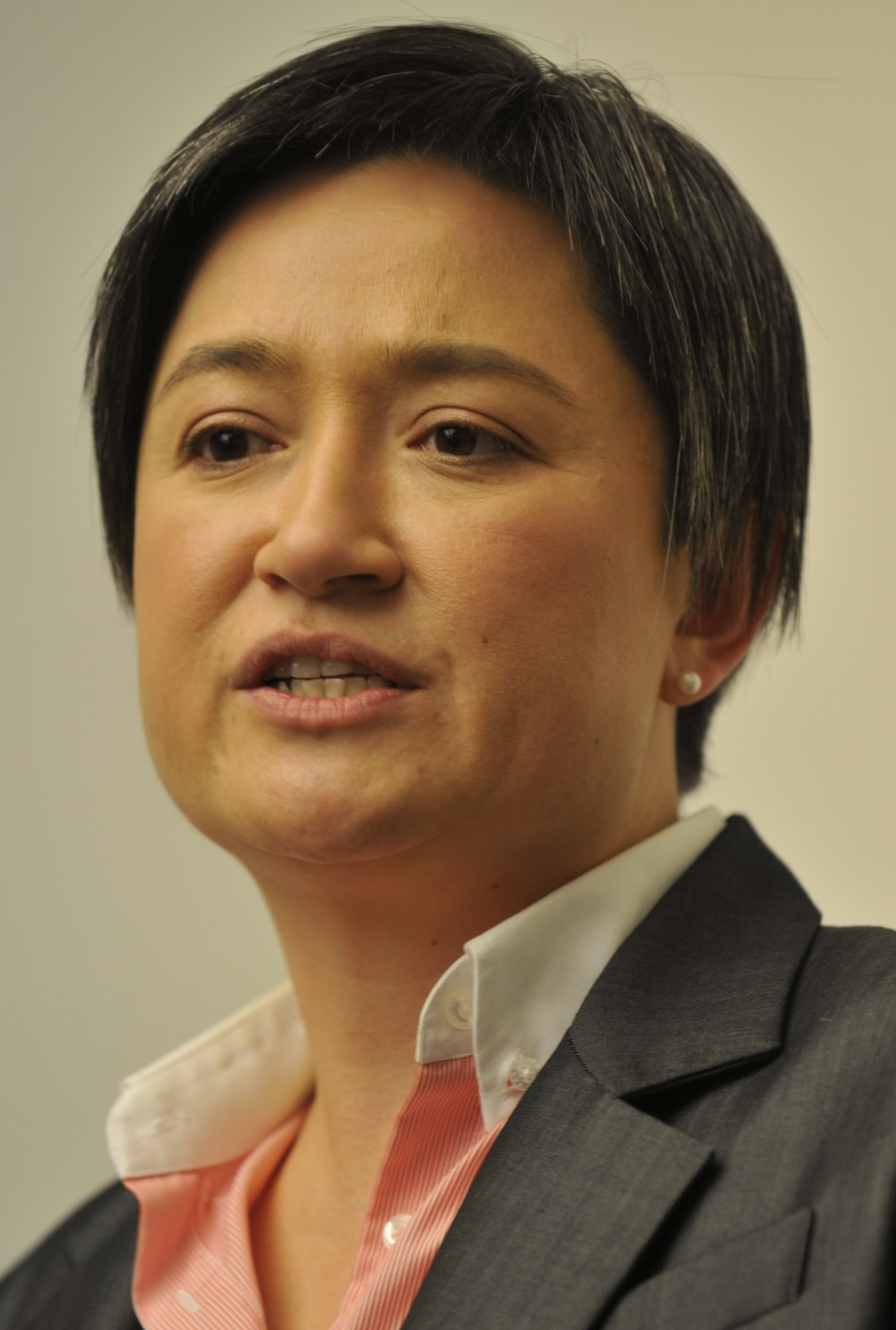

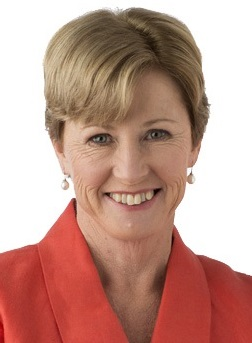

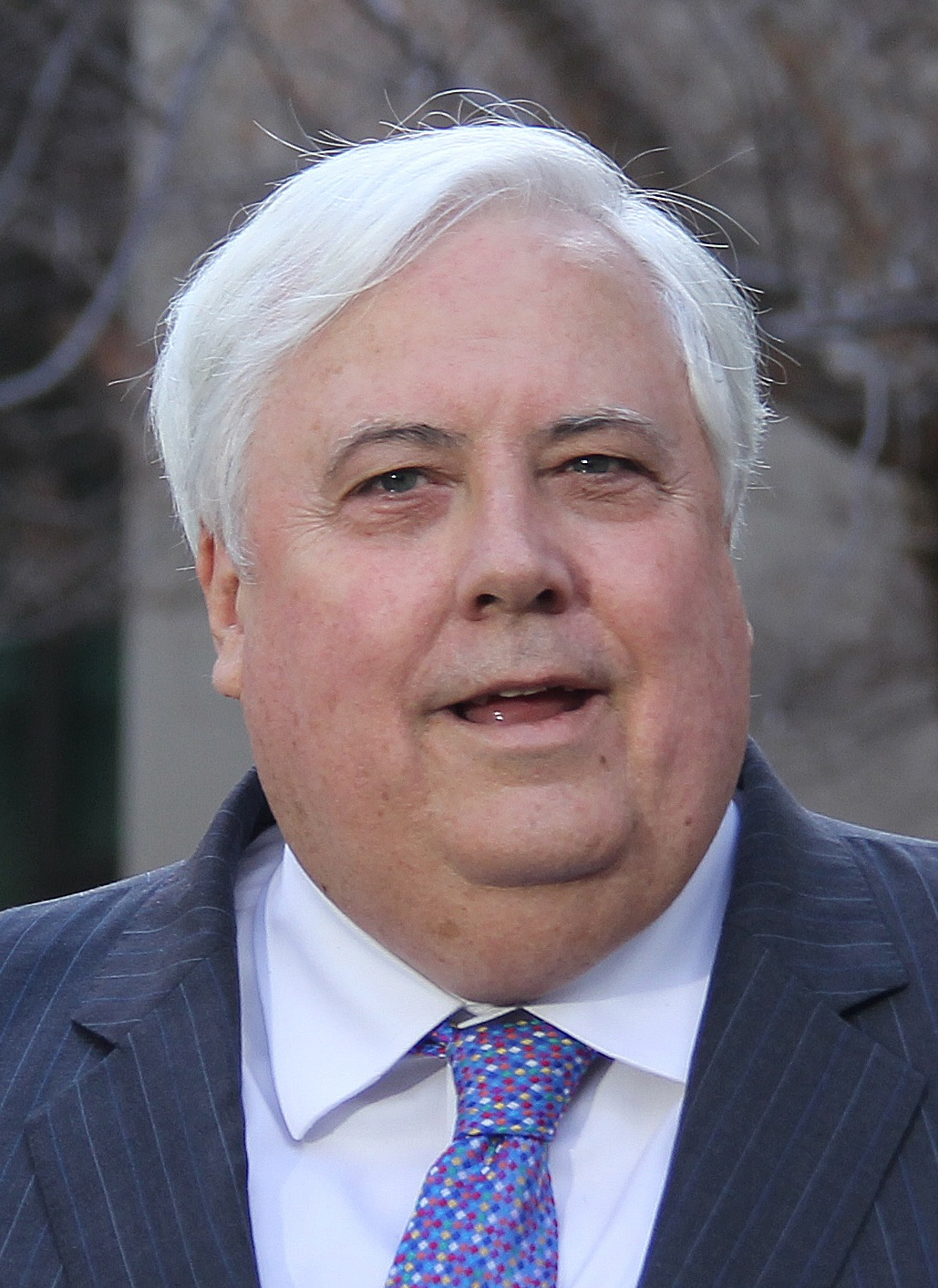

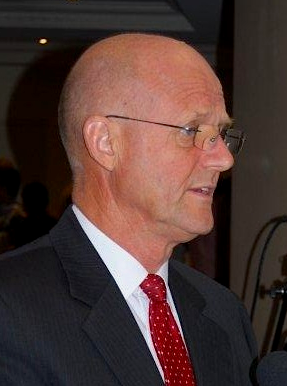

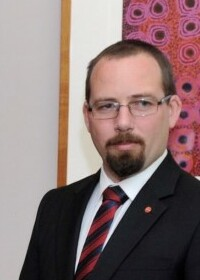
	First party	Second party	Third party
Leader	Eric Abetz (Note: Abetz became the Leader of the Government in the Senate, whereas the leader of the Coalition in the Australian House of Representatives was Tony Abbott.)	Penny Wong (Note: Wong became the Leader of the Opposition in the Senate, whereas the leader of the Labor Party in the Australian House of Representatives was Kevin Rudd.)	Christine Milne
Party	Liberal–National Coalition	Labor	Greens
Leader since	3 May 2010	26 June 2013	13 April 2012
Leader's seat	Tasmania	South Australia	Tasmania
Seats before	34	31	9
Seats won	17	12	4
Seats after	33	25	10
Seat change	▼1	▼6	▲1
Popular vote	5,057,218	4,038,591	1,159,588
Percentage	37.70%	30.11%	8.65%
Swing	▼0.92%	▼5.02%	▼4.46%
	Fourth party	Fifth party	Sixth party
Leader	Clive Palmer	David Leyonhjelm	Bob Day
Party	Palmer United	Liberal Democrats	Family First
Alliance		MPA	MPA
Leader's seat	MP for Fairfax (won seat)	New South Wales (won seat)	South Australia (won seat)
Seats before	New	0	0
Seats won	2	1	1
Seats after	2	1	1
Seat change	▲2	▲1	▲1
Popular vote	658,976	523,831	149,306
Percentage	4.91%	3.91%	1.11%
Swing	▲4.91%	▲2.10%	▲1.11%
	Seventh party	Eighth party
		ASP
Leader	Ricky Muir	Wayne Dropulich
Party	Motoring Enthusiasts	Sports
Alliance	MPA	MPA
Leader's seat	Victoria (won seat)	Western Australia (won seat)
Seats before	New	New
Seats won	1	1
Seats after	1	1
Seat change	▲1	▲1
Popular vote	67,560	2,997
Percentage	0.50%	0.02%
Swing	▲0.50%	▲0.02%
- Senators elected in the 2013 federal election and the WA special election
Leader of the Senate before election
Penny Wong
Labor
Elected Leader of the Senate
Eric Abetz
Liberal/National coalition

The following tables show state-by-state results in the Australian Senate at the 2013 Australian federal election.

Following a dispute of the results, the Western Australian results were declared void. The Western Australian senators were elected at the 2014 special election in Western Australia.

New senators took their places from 1 July 2014. This gave a Senate with the Coalition government on 33 seats, the Australian Labor Party opposition on 25 seats, and a record crossbench of 18: ten Australian Greens, three Palmer United, and single seats to David Leyonhjelm of the Liberal Democratic Party, Bob Day of the Family First Party, Ricky Muir of the Australian Motoring Enthusiast Party, John Madigan of the Democratic Labour Party and Nick Xenophon.

== Australia ==
This table includes votes and percentage from the 2013 election and the seat allocation is based on the void election in Western Australia. The 2014 Australian Senate special election in Western Australia includes the revised national totals after that election.

Senate (STV GV) — Turnout 93.88% (CV) — Informal 2.96%
Party	Votes	%	Swing	Seats won	Total seats	Change
Liberal/National joint ticket (Note: The Liberal and National parties ran a joint ticket in New South Wales and Victoria. It includes the Liberal National Party in Queensland.)	3,938,204	29.36	–0.04	8	16	▼1
Liberal (Note: The Liberals-only ticket ran in Western Australia, South Australia, Tasmania and the Australian Capital Territory.)	1,006,710	7.51	+1.08	8	16	Steady
National (Note: The Nationals-only ticket ran in Western Australia and South Australia.)	69,523	0.52	–0.19	0	0	Steady
Country Liberal (NT)	42,781	0.32	–0.01	1	1	Steady
Coalition total	5,057,218	37.70	–0.92	17	33	▼1
Labor	4,038,591	30.11	–5.02	12	25	▼6
Greens	1,159,588	8.65	–4.46	4	10	▲1
Palmer United	658,976	4.91	+4.91	2	2	▲2
Liberal Democratic Party	523,831	3.91	+2.10	1	1	▲1
Xenophon Group	258,376	1.93	+1.93	1	1	Steady
Sex Party	183,731	1.37	–0.67			
Family First	149,306	1.11	–0.99	1	1	▲1
Shooters and Fishers Party	127,397	0.95	–0.73			
Katter's Australian	119,920	0.89	+0.89			
Democratic Labour	112,549	0.84	–0.22	0	1	Steady
Help End Marijuana Prohibition	95,430	0.71	+0.71			
Animal Justice	93,820	0.70	+0.70			
Wikileaks	88,092	0.66	+0.66			
Christian Democratic Party (Fred Nile Group)	72,544	0.54	–0.47			
One Nation	70,851	0.53	–0.03			
Motoring Enthusiasts	67,560	0.50	+0.50	1	1	▲1
Fishing and Lifestyle	59,907	0.45	+0.07			
Australian Christians	54,154	0.40	+0.40			
Rise Up Australia	49,341	0.37	+0.37			
Australian Independents	45,441	0.34	+0.34			
Pirate	42,102	0.31	+0.31			
Democrats	33,907	0.25	–0.38			
Smokers Rights	25,123	0.19	+0.19			
Voluntary Euthanasia	21,854	0.16	+0.16			
Bullet Train	19,377	0.14	+0.14			
Outdoor Recreation Party (Stop the Greens)	19,013	0.14	+0.14			
No Carbon Tax Climate Sceptics	17,959	0.13	–0.07			
Secular	12,704	0.09	+0.00			
Stable Population	12,671	0.09	+0.09			
Drug Law Reform	10,189	0.08	+0.08			
Australia First	10,157	0.08	–0.00			
Australian Voice	10,057	0.07	+0.07			
Socialist Equality	9,774	0.07	–0.04			
Senator Online	9,625	0.07	–0.07			
Stop CSG Party	7,990	0.06	+0.06			
Building Australia	7,890	0.06	–0.08			
Country Alliance	6,440	0.05	+0.05			
Carers Alliance	5,498	0.04	–0.18			
Uniting Australia	5,423	0.04	+0.04			
Future	4,243	0.03	+0.03			
Protectionist	3,379	0.03	+0.03			
Republican	2,997	0.02	+0.02			
Australian Sports	2,997	0.02	+0.02	1	1	▲1
Socialist Alliance	2,728	0.02	–0.24			
Bank Reform Party	1,828	0.01	+0.01			
Citizens Electoral Council	1,708	0.01	–0.09			
First Nations	1,495	0.01	+0.01			
Non-Custodial Parents	1,357	0.01	–0.02			
Unendorsed/ungrouped	15,489	0.12	–0.32			
Total	13,413,016			40	76	
Invalid/blank votes	409,149	2.96	–0.79			
Registered voters/turnout	14,086,869	93.71				
Source: Commonwealth Election 2013

The Senate has 76 seats. Forty seats were up for election; six in each of the six states, two for the ACT and two for the Northern Territory. The terms of the four senators from the territories commenced on election day. The terms of the six longest-serving state senators ended on 30 June 2014; the terms of the new state senators commenced on 1 July 2014, and were originally supposed to end on 30 June 2020—however, the entire Senate was dissolved at the double-dissolution 2016 election.

The Senate saw the Coalition government on 33 seats with the Labor opposition on 25 seats, the Greens on 10 seats and a crossbench of eight—Palmer United on three seats, with other minor parties and independents on five seats (the LDP's David Leyonhjelm, Family First's Bob Day, Motoring's Ricky Muir and incumbents Nick Xenophon and the DLP's John Madigan). Muir announced he would vote in line with Palmer United. The initial election saw Wayne Dropulich of the Australian Sports Party win a seat in Western Australia, but the subsequent voiding of the result and ensuing special election saw the Palmer United Party gain a third seat. The Coalition government required the support of at least six non-coalition senators to pass legislation.

A record number of candidates stood at the election. Group voting tickets came under scrutiny because multiple candidates were provisionally elected with the vast majority of their 14.3 per cent quotas coming from the preferences of other parties across the political spectrum. "Preference whisperer" Glenn Druery organised tight cross-preferencing between over 30 minor parties as part of his Minor Party Alliance. Sports' Wayne Dropulich won a Senate seat on a record-low primary vote of 0.2 per cent in Western Australia, his party placing 21st out of 28 groups on primary votes. Motoring's Ricky Muir won a senate seat on a record-low primary vote of 0.5 per cent in Victoria. Family First's Bob Day won a seat on a primary vote of 3.8 per cent in South Australia. All three were involved with the Minor Party Alliance. Previous examples of winning with low vote shares include Family First's Steve Fielding in 2004 on 1.9 per cent in Victoria, the Nuclear Disarmament Party's Robert Wood in 1987 on 1.5 per cent in New South Wales, and the DLP's John Madigan won his seat in 2010 on a primary vote of 2.3 per cent in Victoria. Xenophon and larger parties including the incoming government announced they would look at changes to the GVT system.

== New South Wales ==
2013 Australian federal election: Senate, New South Wales
Party	Candidate	Votes	%	±%
Quota		625,164		
Liberal/National Coalition	1. Marise Payne (elected 1); 2. John Williams (elected 3); 3. Arthur Sinodinos (elected 6); 4. Alan Hay; 5. Carolyn Cameron; 6. Angus Cameron	1,496,752	34.20	−4.75
Labor	1. Bob Carr (elected 2); 2. Doug Cameron (elected 4); 3. Ursula Stephens; 4. Glenn Kolomeitz; 5. Nuatali Nelmes; 6. Bhupinder Chhibber	1,381,047	31.56	−4.98
Liberal Democrats	1. David Leyonhjelm (elected 5); 2. Jeffrey Pettett	415,901	9.50	+7.19
Greens	1. Cate Faehrmann; 2. James Ryan; 3. Penny Blatchford; 4. Christina Ho; 5. Amanda Findley; 6. Ben Spies-Butcher	340,941	7.79	−2.90
Palmer United	1. Matthew Adamson; 2. Suellen Wrightson	148,281	3.39	+3.39
Christian Democrats	1. Robyn Peebles; 2. Deborah Lions; 3. Peter Rahme; 4. Caroline Fraser; 5. Ross Clifford	72,544	1.66	−0.28
Democratic Labour	1. Simon McCaffrey; 2. Daniel Hanna	67,549	1.54	+0.79
Shooters and Fishers	1. Karl Houseman; 2. Jim Muirhead	54,658	1.25	−1.08
One Nation	1. Pauline Hanson; 2. Kate McCulloch; 3. Aaron Plumb	53,292	1.22	+0.66
Sex Party	1. Graeme Dunne; 2. Sue Raye	44,830	1.02	−0.75
Wikileaks	1. Kellie Tranter; 2. Alison Broinowski	36,399	0.83	+0.83
HEMP	1. BJ Futter; 2. Jason Olbourne	30,003	0.69	+0.69
Animal Justice	1. Mark Pearson; 2. Kate Vickers	21,215	0.48	+0.48
Fishing and Lifestyle	1. Bob Lowe; 2. Tim Dean	20,515	0.47	+0.47
Katter's Australian	1. Peter Mailler; 2. Tony Maka	19,101	0.44	+0.44
Motoring Enthusiasts	1. Gary Myers; 2. Daniel Kirkness	17,126	0.39	+0.39
Family First	1. Fiona Rossiter; 2. Stan Hurley	16,786	0.38	−0.56
Voluntary Euthanasia	1. Shayne Higson; 2. Loredana Mulhall	14,693	0.34	+0.34
Pirate	1. Brendan Molloy; 2. David Campbell	14,584	0.33	+0.33
Australian Independents	1. Bradley Tanks; 2. Stephen Hirst	9,771	0.22	+0.22
Democrats	1. Ronaldo Villaver; 2. Andrew Wallace	9,482	0.22	−0.46
Bullet Train	1. Tim Bohm; 2. Charlotte Glick	9,299	0.21	+0.21
Smokers Rights	1. Nicole Beiger; 2. James Whelan	8,389	0.19	+0.19
Climate Sceptics	1. Bill Koutalianos; 2. Mijina McDowall	7,913	0.18	−0.03
Outdoor Recreation	1. Rick Obrien; 2. Joaquim De Lima	7,771	0.18	+0.18
Carers Alliance	1. MaryLou Carter; 2. Maree Buckwalter	5,498	0.13	−0.15
Rise Up Australia	1. Norm Bishop; 2. Wayne Somerfield	4,320	0.10	+0.10
Future	1. James Jansson; 2. James Haggerty	4,243	0.10	+0.10
Stop CSG	1. Gordon Fraser; 2. Lynda Dean	4,225	0.10	+0.10
Drug Law Reform	1. Miles Hunt; 2. Tony Trimingham	4,062	0.09	+0.09
Australia First	1. Darrell Wallbridge; 2. Garth Fraser	3,626	0.08	+0.08
Stable Population	1. William Bourke; 2. Kris Spike	3,279	0.07	+0.07
Secular	1. Ian Bryce; 2. Christopher Owen	2,905	0.07	−0.03
Socialist Alliance	1. Jim McIlroy; 2. Reg Dare	2,728	0.06	−0.50
Australian Voice	1. Criselee Stevens; 2. Keith Francis; 3. Richard Black	2,587	0.06	+0.06
Senator Online	1. Tim Ferguson; 2. Tony Barry; 3. Don McKinnon	2,502	0.06	−0.01
Group AG	1. Tom Wang; 2. Daniel O'Toole	2,464	0.06	+0.06
Protectionist	1. Mark Grech; 2. Christian Johns	2,424	0.06	+0.06
Building Australia	1. Ray Brown; 2. Melanie Symington	2,309	0.05	−0.21
Group F	1. Andrew Whalan; 2. Peter Cooper	2,299	0.05	+0.05
Uniting Australia	1. Peter Simonds; 2. Tanya Watt	2,187	0.05	+0.05
Republican	1. Kerry McNally; 2. Jason Blake	1,932	0.04	+0.04
Socialist Equality	1. Nick Beams; 2. Zac Hambides	1,800	0.04	−0.05
Non-Custodial Parents	1. Andy Thompson; 2. Josh Thompson	1,357	0.03	−0.06
Independent	David Ash	227	0.01	+0.01
Ungrouped	Ron Poulsen	148	0.00	+0.00
Independent	John La Mela	114	0.00	+0.00
Independent	Sam Nathan	62	0.00	+0.00
Total formal votes		4,376,143	96.68	+0.85
Informal votes		150,239	3.32	−0.85
Turnout		4,526,382	93.95	−0.03

Elected	#	Senator	Party
2013	1	Marise Payne	Liberal
2013	2	Bob Carr	Labor
2013	3	John Williams	National
2013	4	Doug Cameron	Labor
2013	5	David Leyonhjelm	LDP
2013	6	Arthur Sinodinos	Liberal
2010
2010	1	Concetta Fierravanti-Wells	Liberal
2010	2	John Faulkner	Labor
2010	3	Bill Heffernan	Liberal
2010	4	Matt Thistlethwaite	Labor
2010	5	Fiona Nash	National
2010	6	Lee Rhiannon	Greens

== Victoria ==
2013 Australian federal election: Senate, Victoria
Party	Candidate	Votes	%	±%
Quota		483,076		
Liberal/National Coalition	1. Mitch Fifield (elected 1); 2. Scott Ryan (elected 3); 3. Helen Kroger; 4. Martin Corboy	1,357,153	40.13	+5.72
Labor	1. Gavin Marshall (elected 2); 2. Jacinta Collins (elected 4); 3. Mehmet Tillem; 4. Lynn Psaila; 5. Terry Larkins; 6. Jamie Mileto	1,097,255	32.45	−5.30
Greens	1. Janet Rice (elected 5); 2. Trent McCarthy; 3. Huong Truong; 4. Ian Christoe; 5. Gurm Sekhon; 6. Robert Humphreys	366,720	10.84	−3.80
Palmer United	1. Barry Michael; 2. Doug Hawkins; 3. Penny Palman	123,889	3.66	+3.66
Sex Party	1. Fiona Patten; 2. Ange Hopkins	63,883	1.89	−0.37
Family First	1. Ashley Fenn; 2. Trudie Morris	51,658	1.53	−1.11
Wikileaks	1. Julian Assange; 2. Leslie Cannold; 3. Binoy Kampmark	41,926	1.24	+1.24
Rise Up Australia	1. Daniel Nalliah; 2. Rosalie Crestani	31,000	0.92	+0.92
Shooters and Fishers	1. Terry Maloney; 2. Steve Malcolm	28,220	0.83	−0.56
Animal Justice	1. Bruce Poon; 2. Sarah Davison	25,470	0.75	+0.75
Democratic Labour	1. Mark Farrell; 2. Stephanie Mazzarella	23,883	0.71	−1.62
HEMP	1. Matt Riley; 2. Ryan Fletcher	20,084	0.59	+0.59
Motoring Enthusiasts	1. Ricky Muir (elected 6); 2. Craig Gill	17,122	0.51	+0.51
Christians	1. Vickie Janson; 2. Frank Papafotiou	16,523	0.49	+0.49
Fishing and Lifestyle	1. Joe Zammit; 2. Richard Abela	16,186	0.48	+0.48
Katter's Australian	1. Geoff Herbert; 2. Joanne Rolls	15,535	0.46	+0.46
Pirate	1. Joseph Miles; 2. Geoffrey Hammett	12,591	0.37	+0.37
Australian Independents	1. Samantha Shaw; 2. Yvonne Wood	11,462	0.34	+0.34
Democrats	1. David Collyer; 2. Roger Howe; 3. Sarina Isgro; 4. Greg Raines; 5. Robert Livesay; 6. Richard Grummet	10,877	0.32	−0.17
Senator Online	1. Lloyd Taylor; 2. Tony Smith	5,966	0.18	+0.11
Country Alliance	1. Andrew Jones; 2. Garry Kerr	5,164	0.15	+0.15
Climate Sceptics	1. Chris Dawson; 2. John Rodda	5,104	0.15	0.00
Bullet Train	1. Mark Erwood; 2. Steve Phillips	5,012	0.15	+0.15
Secular	1. John Perkins; 2. Rosemary Sceats	4,379	0.13	+0.02
Drug Law Reform	1. Greg Chipp; 2. John Sherman	4,095	0.12	+0.12
Stable Population	1. Clifford Hayes; 2. Jill Quirk	3,952	0.12	+0.12
Building Australia	1. Darren Evans; 2. Samuel White	2,937	0.09	−0.06
Australian Voice	1. Immanuel Shmuel; 2. Vern Hughes	2,503	0.07	+0.07
Socialist Equality	1. Patrick O'Connor; 2. Tania Baptist	2,332	0.07	−0.25
Bank Reform	1. Maria Rigoni; 2. Paul Rigoni	1,828	0.05	+0.05
Group T	1. Joseph Toscano; 2. Beth Matthews	1,637	0.05	+0.05
Stop CSG	1. Roger Thorrowgood; 2. Adele Van Rosmalen	1,408	0.04	+0.04
Citizens Electoral Council	1. Craig Isherwood; 2. Robert Barwick	1,401	0.04	−0.03
Group AJ	1. Bob Nicholls; 2. Kylie Nicholls; 3. Peter Webb	551	0.02	+0.02
Independent	Lyn Gunter	491	0.01	+0.01
Outdoor Recreation	1. Simon Christie; 2. Terry Destry	398	0.01	+0.01
Liberal Democrats	1. Peter Whelan; 2. Tim Wilms	363	0.01	−1.80
One Nation	1. Dale Townsend; 2. Rosalie Townsend	242	0.01	−0.30
Independent	Darrell Morrison	213	0.01	+0.01
Smokers Rights	1. Abe Salt; 2. Janos Beregszaszi	78	0.00	+0.00
Republican	1. Peter Consandine; 2. Clinton Portors	38	0.00	+0.00
Total formal votes		3,381,529	96.63	+0.57
Informal votes		117,909	3.37	−0.57
Turnout		3,499,438	94.08	+0.01

Elected	#	Senator	Party
2013	1	Mitch Fifield	Liberal
2013	2	Gavin Marshall	Labor
2013	3	Scott Ryan	Liberal
2013	4	Jacinta Collins	Labor
2013	5	Janet Rice	Greens
2013	6	Ricky Muir	Motoring
2010
2010	1	Kim Carr	Labor
2010	2	Michael Ronaldson	Liberal
2010	3	Richard Di Natale	Greens
2010	4	Stephen Conroy	Labor
2010	5	Bridget McKenzie	National
2010	6	John Madigan	DLP

== Queensland ==
2013 Australian federal election: Senate, Queensland
Party	Candidate	Votes	%	±%
Quota		374,209		
Liberal National	1. Ian Macdonald (elected 1); 2. James McGrath (elected 3); 3. Matt Canavan (elected 6); 4. David Goodwin; 5. Theresa Craig; 6. Amanda Stoker	1,084,299	41.39	−0.03
Labor	1. Chris Ketter (elected 2); 2. Claire Moore (elected 4); 3. Mark Furner; 4. Nikki Boyd	747,096	28.52	−0.87
Palmer United	1. Glenn Lazarus (elected 5); 2. Scott Higgins; 3. Clive Mensink	258,944	9.89	+9.89
Greens	1. Adam Stone; 2. Sandra Bayley; 3. Stuart Yeaman	158,150	6.04	−6.72
Katter's Australian	1. James Blundell; 2. Shane Paulger; 3. Les Muckan	76,918	2.94	+2.94
Sex Party	1. Joel Murray; 2. Kirsty Patten	29,380	1.12	−1.47
Family First	1. Aidan McLindon; 2. Sally Vincent	28,644	1.09	−2.33
Animal Justice	1. Jeanette Peterson; 2. Christopher O'Brien	27,984	1.07	+1.07
HEMP	1. James Moylan; 2. Robbo Yobbo	23,624	0.90	+0.90
Motoring Enthusiasts	1. Keith Littler; 2. Tony Morrison	18,742	0.72	+0.72
Shooters and Fishers	1. David Curless; 2. Pete Johnson	18,235	0.70	−1.04
Liberal Democrats	1. Gabriel Buckley; 2. Cameron Mitchell	18,201	0.69	−1.56
One Nation	1. Jim Savage; 2. Ian Nelson	14,348	0.55	−0.36
Fishing and Lifestyle	1. Daniel McCarthy; 2. Suzzanne Wyatt	13,394	0.51	−1.47
Pirate	1. Liam Pomfret; 2. Melanie Thomas	12,973	0.50	+0.50
Australian Independents	1. Patricia Petersen; 2. Janene Maxwell-Jones	12,448	0.48	+0.48
Christians	1. Ludy Sweeris-Sigrist; 2. Malcolm Brice	10,970	0.42	+0.42
Democratic Labour	1. John Quinn; 2. Sheila Vincent	8,376	0.32	−0.14
Outdoor Recreation	1. John Rooth; 2. Fay Destry	7,085	0.27	+0.27
Democrats	1. Paul Stevenson; 2. Cheryl Hayden	6,611	0.25	−0.53
Australia First	1. Peter Schuback; 2. Peter Watson	6,531	0.25	−0.15
Rise Up Australia	1. Michael Jennings; 2. Garry White	5,567	0.21	+0.21
Smokers Rights	1. Rachel Connor; 2. Kelly Liddle	5,235	0.20	+0.20
Australian Voice	1. Bevan Collingwood; 2. George Friend	3,828	0.15	+0.15
Secular	1. Hilton Travis; 2. Neil Muirhead	2,663	0.10	+0.02
Uniting Australia	1. John Smith; 2. Danny Watt; 3. Peter Banhuk	2,580	0.10	+0.10
Stop CSG	1. Brian Monk; 2. Deedre Kabel	2,357	0.09	+0.09
Climate Sceptics	1. Terence Cardwell; 2. Alan Rutland	2,134	0.08	−0.11
Group C	1. Peter Keioskie; 2. Roland Taylor	2,099	0.08	+0.08
Group U	1. Greg Rudd; 2. Emily Dinsey	2,057	0.08	+0.08
Building Australia	1. Stuart Osman; 2. Ryan Harris	1,782	0.07	+0.07
Socialist Equality	1. Mike Head; 2. Gabriela Zabala	1,642	0.06	+0.06
Stable Population	2. Jane O'Sullivan; 2. Matt Moran	1,563	0.06	+0.06
Senator Online	1. LB Joum; 2. Ricky Jefferyes	1,053	0.04	−0.32
Republican	1. Jeffery Talbot; 2. Rees Pearse	993	0.04	+0.04
Protectionist	1. Doug Boag; 2. Rick Heyward	955	0.04	+0.04
Total formal votes		2,619,461	97.84	+1.34
Informal votes		57,947	2.16	−1.34
Turnout		2,677,408	94.17	+0.79

Elected	#	Senator	Party
2013	1	Ian Macdonald	LNP
2013	2	Chris Ketter	Labor
2013	3	James McGrath	LNP
2013	4	Claire Moore	Labor
2013	5	Glenn Lazarus	Palmer
2013	6	Matt Canavan	LNP
2010
2010	1	George Brandis	LNP
2010	2	Joe Ludwig	Labor
2010	3	Barnaby Joyce	LNP
2010	4	Jan McLucas	Labor
2010	5	Larissa Waters	Greens
2010	6	Brett Mason	LNP

== Western Australia ==
2013 Australian federal election: Senate, Western Australia
Party	Candidate	Votes	%	±%
Quota		187,183		
Liberal	1. David Johnston (elected 1); 2. Michaelia Cash (elected 3); 3. Linda Reynolds (elected 4); 4. Slade Brockman; 5. Steve Thomas; 6. Chris Oughton	513,639	39.20	−3.79
Labor	1. Joe Bullock (elected 2); 2. Louise Pratt; 3. Peter Foster; 4. Suliman Ali	348,401	26.59	−3.11
Greens	1. Scott Ludlam (elected 6); 2. Kate Davis; 3. Adam Duncan	124,354	9.49	−4.47
National	1. David Wirrpanda; 2. David Eagles	66,421	5.07	+1.64
Palmer United	1. Dio Wang; 2. Chamonix Terblanche	65,595	5.01	+5.01
Liberal Democrats	1. Jim Fryar; 2. Neil Hamilton	44,902	3.43	+2.25
Christians	1. Jamie Van Burgel; 2. Justin Moseley	21,499	1.64	+1.64
Sex Party	1. Steve Palmer; 2. Mark Coleman	19,519	1.49	−0.76
HEMP	1. Michael Balderstone; 2. Tayla Moylan	13,973	1.07	+1.07
Shooters and Fishers	1. Murray Bow; 1. John Parkes	13,622	1.04	+0.44
Wikileaks	1. Gerry Georgatos; 2. Suresh Rajan	9,767	0.75	+0.75
Animal Justice	1. Katrina Love; 2. Alicia Sutton	9,720	0.74	+0.74
Family First	1. Linda Rose; 2. Henry Heng	8,783	0.67	−0.48
Smokers Rights	1. Max Katz-Barber; 2. Daniel Di Rado	8,719	0.67	+0.67
Motoring Enthusiasts	1. Richie Howlett; 2. Sharon Young	7,748	0.59	+0.59
Fishing and Lifestyle	1. Jay Edwards; 2. Ross Finlayson	5,729	0.44	+0.44
Australian Independents	1. Daryl Higgins; 2. Patricia Irving	4,041	0.31	+0.31
Katter's Australian	1. Anthony Fels; 2. Susan Hoddinott	3,909	0.30	+0.30
Rise Up Australia	1. Jane Foreman; 2. Joanne Bennett	3,861	0.29	+0.29
Democrats	1. Chris Fernandez; 2. William Thiel	3,841	0.29	−0.09
Sports Party	1. Wayne Dropulich (elected 5); 2. Al Lackovic	2,997	0.23	+0.23
Outdoor Recreation	1. David Fishlock; 2. Kim Kinninmont	2,215	0.17	+0.17
Secular	1. Edward Atkins; 2. Simon Cuthbert	1,486	0.11	+0.03
Climate Sceptics	1. Adrian Byass; 2. Heather Dewar	1,481	0.11	−0.05
Stable Population	1. Peter Strachan; 2. John Banks	1,352	0.10	+0.10
Socialist Equality	1. Peter Symonds; 2. Joe Lopez	1,143	0.09	+0.09
Australian Voice	1. Brian Parkes; 2. Sean Butler	1,139	0.09	+0.09
One Nation	Robert Farmer	422	0.03	+0.03
Total formal votes		1,310,278	97.14	+0.32
Informal votes		38,519	2.86	−0.32
Turnout		1,348,797	92.77	−0.78

Elected	#	Senator	Party
2013	1	David Johnston	Liberal
2013	2	Joe Bullock	Labor
2013	3	Michaelia Cash	Liberal
2013	4	Linda Reynolds	Liberal
2013	5	Wayne Dropulich	Sports
2013	6	Scott Ludlam	Greens
2010
2010	1	Mathias Cormann	Liberal
2010	2	Chris Evans	Labor
2010	3	Chris Back	Liberal
2010	4	Glenn Sterle	Labor
2010	5	Judith Adams	Liberal
2010	6	Rachel Siewert	Greens

== South Australia ==
2013 Australian federal election: Senate, South Australia
Party	Candidate	Votes	%	±%
Quota		148,348		
Liberal	1. Cory Bernardi (elected 1); 2. Simon Birmingham (elected 6); 3. Cathie Webb; 4. Gary Burgess	285,058	27.45	−9.85
Xenophon Group	1. Nick Xenophon (elected 2); 2. Stirling Griff	258,376	24.88	+24.88
Labor	1. Penny Wong (elected 3); 2. Don Farrell; 3. Simon Pisoni	235,312	22.66	−15.63
Greens	1. Sarah Hanson-Young (elected 4); 2. Nikki Mortier; 3. Matthew Carey	73,612	7.09	−6.21
Family First	1. Bob Day (elected 5); 2. Judi Potter; 3. Dan Casey	39,032	3.76	−0.32
Liberal Democrats	1. Michael Gameau; 2. Michael Noack	36,657	3.53	+2.98
Palmer United	1. James McDonald; 2. Peter Collis	27,484	2.65	+2.65
Sex Party	1. Deb Milka; 2. Jason Virgo	10,427	1.00	−0.67
Democratic Labour	1. Kim Lawless; 2. Tanya Linsell	10,143	0.98	+0.31
Motoring Enthusiasts	1. Nathan Green; 2. Robert Stewart	6,822	0.66	+0.66
Animal Justice	1. Colin Thomas; 2. Sally Sutton	6,439	0.62	+0.62
Shooters and Fishers	1. Jess Marks; 2. John Hahn	6,151	0.59	−0.54
HEMP	1. Ray Thorpe; 2. Chris Calvert	6,032	0.58	+0.58
Christians	1. Trevor Grace; 2. Theophilus Engela	3,540	0.34	+0.34
Fishing and Lifestyle	1. Darren Haydon; 2. Chris Miles	3,354	0.32	+0.32
Voluntary Euthanasia	1. Maxwell Bromson; 2. Michael Boerema	3,198	0.31	+0.31
National	1. James Stacey; 2. Rachel Titley	3,102	0.30	+0.30
Democrats	1. Jeanie Walker; 2. Andrew Castrique	3,096	0.30	−0.39
One Nation	1. Peter Fitzpatrick; 2. Kym Dunbar	2,968	0.29	−0.22
Socialist Equality	1. James Cogan; 2. Peter Byrne	2,857	0.28	+0.28
Australian Independents	1. Tanya Crago; 2. Graeme Maxwell-Jones	2,089	0.20	+0.20
Smokers Rights	1. Tyrone Lock; 2. Adam Frost	1,899	0.18	+0.18
Katter's Australian	1. Leah O'Rourke; 2. Glenn O'Rourke	1,666	0.16	+0.16
Group I	1. Ribnga Green; 2. Zita Ngor	1,515	0.15	+0.15
Secular	1. Moira Clarke; 2. Catherine Mactier	1,271	0.12	+0.03
Rise Up Australia	1. Jeff Flint; 2. Paul Hales	1,241	0.12	+0.12
Drug Law Reform	1. Damon Adams; 2. John Jiggens	1,118	0.11	+0.11
Climate Sceptics	1. Leon Ashby; 2. David Smith	1,116	0.11	−0.35
Building Australia	1. Michael Noble; 2. Bill Adams	862	0.08	−0.07
Stable Population	1. Greg Oates; 2. Madeleine Wearne	765	0.07	+0.07
Group L	1. Dianah Mieglich; 2. John Rohde	581	0.06	+0.06
Country Alliance	1. Steven Davies; 2. John Michelmore	325	0.03	+0.03
Outdoor Recreation	1. Steven Burgess; 2. Gordon Bennett	145	0.01	+0.01
Independent	Robert Weaver	99	0.01	+0.01
Independent	Christopher Cochrane	82	0.01	+0.01
Total formal votes		1,038,434	97.35	+0.47
Informal votes		28,225	2.65	−0.47
Turnout		1,066,659	94.35	+0.02

Elected	#	Senator	Party
2013	1	Cory Bernardi	Liberal
2013	2	Nick Xenophon	Independent
2013	3	Penny Wong	Labor
2013	4	Sarah Hanson-Young	Greens
2013	5	Bob Day	Family First
2013	6	Simon Birmingham	Liberal
2010
2010	1	Alex Gallacher	Labor
2010	2	Mary Jo Fisher	Liberal
2010	3	Anne McEwen	Labor
2010	4	Sean Edwards	Liberal
2010	5	Penny Wright	Greens
2010	6	David Fawcett	Liberal

== Tasmania ==
2013 Australian federal election: Senate, Tasmania
Party	Candidate	Votes	%	±%
Quota		48,137		
Liberal	1. Richard Colbeck (elected 1); 2. David Bushby (elected 3); 3. Sally Chandler; 4. Sarah Courtney	126,400	37.51	+4.54
Labor	1. Carol Brown (elected 2); 2. Catryna Bilyk (elected 4); 3. Lin Thorp; 4. John Dowling	110,617	32.83	−8.57
Greens	1. Peter Whish-Wilson (elected 5); 2. Helen Burnet; 3. Penelope Ann	39,284	11.66	−8.61
Palmer United	1. Jacqui Lambie (elected 6); 2. Kevin Deakin	22,184	6.58	+6.58
Liberal Democrats	1. Clinton Mead; 2. Katrina Lloyd	7,807	2.32	+2.32
Sex Party	1. Robbie Swan; 2. Liam Eales	4,873	1.45	+1.45
Family First	1. Peter Madden; 2. Andrew Goelst; 3. Nick Cramp; 4. Mihi Ngawhare	4,403	1.31	+0.09
Shooters and Fishers	1. Matthew Allen; 2. Shane Broadby	3,697	1.10	−0.91
Democratic Labour	1. Robyne Ferri; 2. Glen McNamara	2,598	0.77	+0.30
Australian Independents	1. Neville Solomon; 2. Steven Wood	2,494	0.74	+0.74
Pirate	1. Thomas Randle; 2. Thomas Storey	1,954	0.58	+0.58
HEMP	1. Matt Owen; 2. John Reeves	1,714	0.51	+0.51
Christians	1. Kevin Swarts; 2. Ans Jongeling	1,622	0.48	+0.48
Outdoor Recreation	1. Ian Best; 2. John Phibbs	1,399	0.42	+0.42
Katter's Australian	1. Geoff Herbert; 2. Joanne Rolls	1,375	0.41	+0.41
Rise Up Australia	1. Philip Lamont; 2. Peter Gathercole	996	0.30	+0.30
Country Alliance	1. Cheryl Arnol; 2. Debra Garth	951	0.28	+0.28
Smokers Rights	1. Graham Nickols; 2. Matthew Thompson	803	0.24	+0.24
Fishing and Lifestyle	1. Maxwell Stewart; 2. Lorraine Stewart	729	0.22	+0.22
Stable Population	1. Todd Dudley; 2. Pierre Richardson	372	0.11	+0.11
Independent	Andrew Roberts	332	0.10	+0.10
Climate Sceptics	1. James Hawes; 2. Petta Hines	211	0.06	−0.17
Senator Online	1. David Bullard; 2. Sven Wiener	104	0.03	−0.42
Republican	1. Nick Rouen; 2. Timothy Rouen	34	0.01	+0.01
Total formal votes		336,953	97.54	+0.77
Informal votes		8,486	2.46	−0.77
Turnout		345,439	95.13	−0.17

Elected	#	Senator	Party
2013	1	Richard Colbeck	Liberal
2013	2	Carol Brown	Labor
2013	3	David Bushby	Liberal
2013	4	Catryna Bilyk	Labor
2013	5	Peter Whish-Wilson	Greens
2013	6	Jacqui Lambie	Palmer
2010
2010	1	Helen Polley	Labor
2010	2	Eric Abetz	Liberal
2010	3	Christine Milne	Greens
2010	4	Anne Urquhart	Labor
2010	5	Stephen Parry	Liberal
2010	6	Lisa Singh	Labor

== Territories ==
=== Australian Capital Territory ===
2013 Australian federal election: Senate, Australian Capital Territory
Party	Candidate	Votes	%	±%
Quota		82,248		
Labor	1. Kate Lundy (elected 1); 2. Chris Sant	84,974	34.44	−6.40
Liberal	1. Zed Seselja (elected 2); 2. Merinda Nash	81,613	33.08	−0.27
Greens	1. Simon Sheikh; 2. Indra Esguerra	47,553	19.27	−3.65
Sex Party	1. Deborah Avery; 2. Jamie Miller	8,616	3.49	+3.49
Palmer United	1. Wayne Slattery; 2. Paul Teerman	5,213	2.11	+2.11
Bullet Train	1. Chris Bucknell; 2. Michael Lemmey	5,066	2.05	+2.05
Voluntary Euthanasia	1. Philip Nitschke; 2. Susan Macdougall	3,963	1.61	+1.61
Animal Justice	1. Marcus Fillinger; 2. Jessica Montagne	2,992	1.21	+1.21
Australian Independents	1. Anthony Fernie; 2. Valma Petersen	1,592	0.65	+0.65
Katter's Australian	1. Steven Bailey; 2. Joe Arnold	1,416	0.57	+0.57
Rise Up Australia	1. Irwin Ross; 2. Jose Henriquez	1,381	0.56	+0.56
Stable Population	1. Mark O'Connor; 2. Greg Graham	931	0.38	+0.38
Drug Law Reform	1. Paul Cubitt; 2. Stacey Dowson	914	0.37	+0.37
Independent	Emmanuel Ezekiel-Hart	518	0.21	+0.21
Total formal votes		246,742	98.02	+0.57
Informal votes		4,980	1.98	−0.57
Turnout		251,722	94.82	−0.07

Elected	#	Senator	Party
2013	1	Kate Lundy	Labor
2013	2	Zed Seselja	Liberal

=== Northern Territory ===
2013 Australian federal election: Senate, Northern Territory
Party	Candidate	Votes	%	±%
Quota		34,494		
Country Liberal	1. Nigel Scullion (elected 1); 2. Linda Fazldeen	42,781	41.34	+0.73
Labor	1. Nova Peris (elected 2); 2. Rowan Foley	33,889	32.75	−1.64
Greens	1. Warren H Williams; 2. Michael Brand	8,974	8.67	−4.88
Palmer United	1. Douglas Te Wake; 2. John McCabe	7,386	7.14	+7.14
Shooters and Fishers	1. Matt Graham; 2. Christopher Righton	2,814	2.72	−2.08
Sex Party	1. Joanne Edwards; 2. Tracey Randall	2,203	2.13	−2.97
Australian Independents	1. Phil Walcott; 2. Lisa Futcher	1,544	1.49	+1.49
First Nations	1. Rosalie Kunoth-Monks; 2. Jeannie Gadambua	1,495	1.44	+1.44
Rise Up Australia	1. Jan Pile; 2. Michael Cox	975	0.94	+0.94
Uniting Australia	1. Gary Bell; 2. Kathryn Watt	656	0.63	+0.63
Stable Population	1. Jim Miles; 2. Mark Russell	455	0.44	+0.44
Citizens Electoral Council	1. Vernon Work; 2. Mile Stankovic	307	0.30	−0.62
Total formal votes		103,479	97.33	+1.02
Informal votes		2,837	2.67	−1.02
Turnout		106,316	82.29	−0.64

Elected	#	Senator	Party
2013	1	Nigel Scullion	CLP
2013	2	Nova Peris	Labor

== See also ==
- 2013 Australian federal election
- Results of the 2013 Australian federal election (House of Representatives)
- Post-election pendulum for the 2013 Australian federal election
- Members of the Australian Senate, 2014–2016
