= Scott Ludlam =

Australian politician

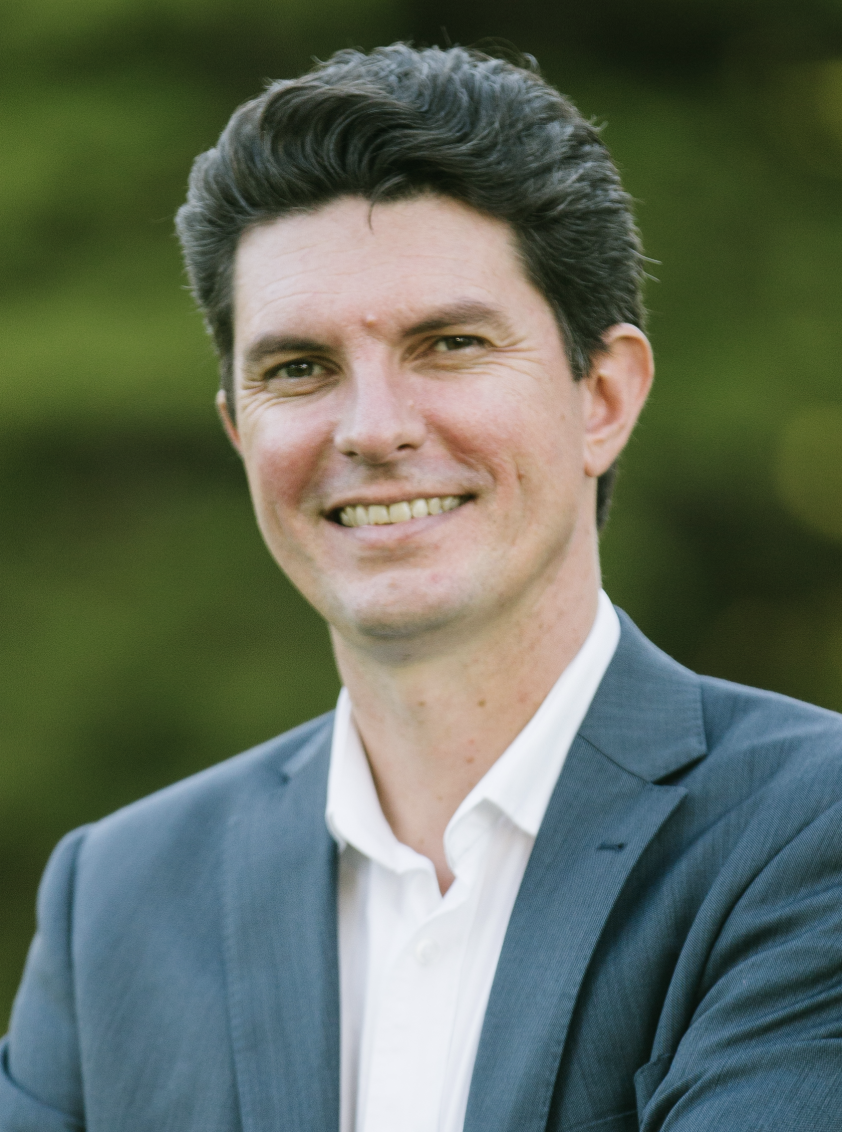

Co-Deputy Leader of the Australian Greens
- In office 6 May 2015 – 14 July 2017 Serving with Larissa Waters
- Leader: Richard Di Natale
- Preceded by: Adam Bandt
- Succeeded by: Adam Bandt and Rachel Siewert (acting)

Senator for Western Australia
- In office 1 July 2008 – 14 July 2017
- Preceded by: Ruth Webber
- Succeeded by: Jordon Steele-John

Personal details
- Born: 10 January 1970 (age 56) Palmerston North, New Zealand
- Party: Greens
- Education: Curtin University; Murdoch University
- Website: scottludlam.com

Scott Ludlam (born 10 January 1970) is an Australian former politician. A member of the Australian Greens, he was a senator in the Australian Senate from July 2008 to July 2017 and served as deputy leader of the Greens. Ludlam represented the state of Western Australia and resigned when it was found that he had been ineligible to sit in the Senate due to holding dual citizenship of New Zealand and Australia.

== Early life and education ==
Ludlam was born in Palmerston North, New Zealand. He left New Zealand with his family aged three and settled in Australia at eight years old. In Western Australia he studied design at Curtin University, and then policy studies at Murdoch University. He worked as a film-maker, artist and graphic designer. In the 1980s after participating in the experiential deep ecology training of Joanna Macy, Ludlam worked for a while as co-editor of the Gaia Journal and assisted in the design of its website. He subsequently became involved in anti-nuclear issues in Western Australia, before becoming increasingly involved in the Western Australian Greens.

== Political career ==
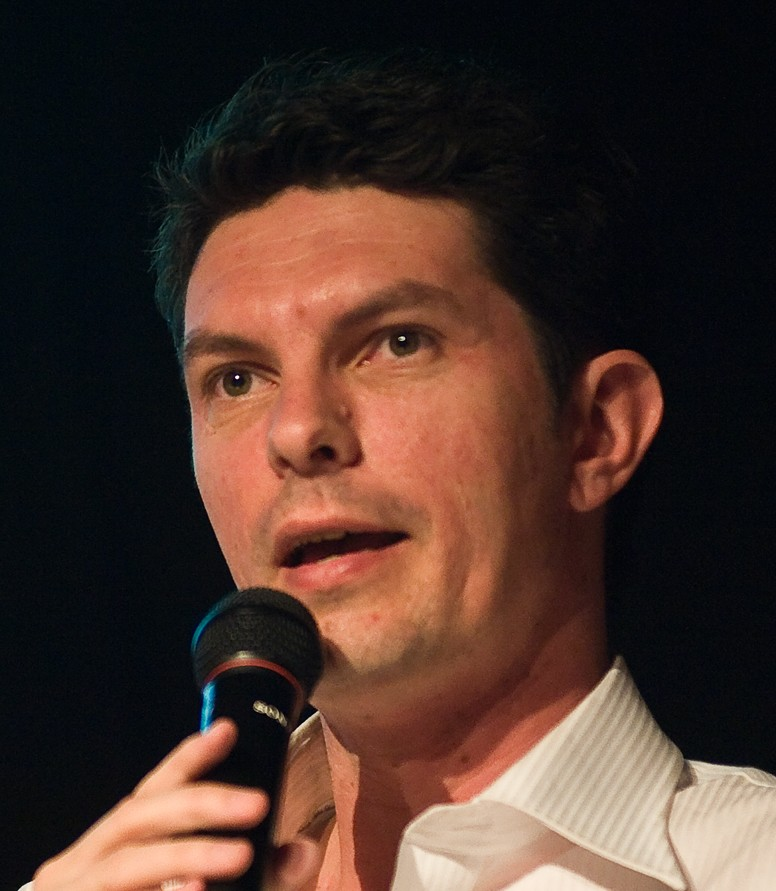
Ludlam at GLAM-wiki Canberra in 2009

At the 2001 state election, Ludlam was the unsuccessful second candidate on the Greens ticket for the upper house Mining & Pastoral region. From 2001 to 2005, Ludlam worked for Greens state parliamentarian Robin Chapple. From 2005 to 2007, he worked as a communications officer for Australian Greens Senator Rachel Siewert. At the 2005 state election, Ludlam unsuccessfully contested the seat of Murchison-Eyre, obtaining 4.98 percent of the primary vote.

At the 2007 federal election, Ludlam was elected to the Australian Senate, representing Western Australia. His term commenced on 1 July 2008, and he took his place on 26 August with other incoming Senators.

Following the 2013 federal election, it was initially announced that Ludlam had lost his bid for re-election, eliminated by Palmer United Party candidate Zhenya Wang, with his term due to expire on 30 June 2014. However an Australian Electoral Commission recount of votes raised some controversy over the loss of ballot papers, and resulted in Ludlam and Wayne Dropulich of the Australian Sports Party winning the fifth and sixth Senate spots respectively. After the recount, it came to light that there were 1375 missing votes and the High Court of Australia ruled that the recount results were invalid because the number of votes lost far exceeded the margin between candidates. At the 5 April 2014 re-election, Ludlam safely held his seat in the Senate.

Ludlam has been involved in numerous political campaigns, including opposition to uranium mining at Jabiluka and in Western Australia, nuclear weapons, foreign military bases, and support for Aboriginal land rights, peace and disarmament, recognition of climate change, advocacy of fair trade and equitable globalisation, and energy market reform.

After taking his seat in the Senate, Ludlam campaigned against internet censorship, for strengthened protections for public ownership of the National Broadband Network, and for the fair treatment of Julian Assange and the WikiLeaks publishing organisation.

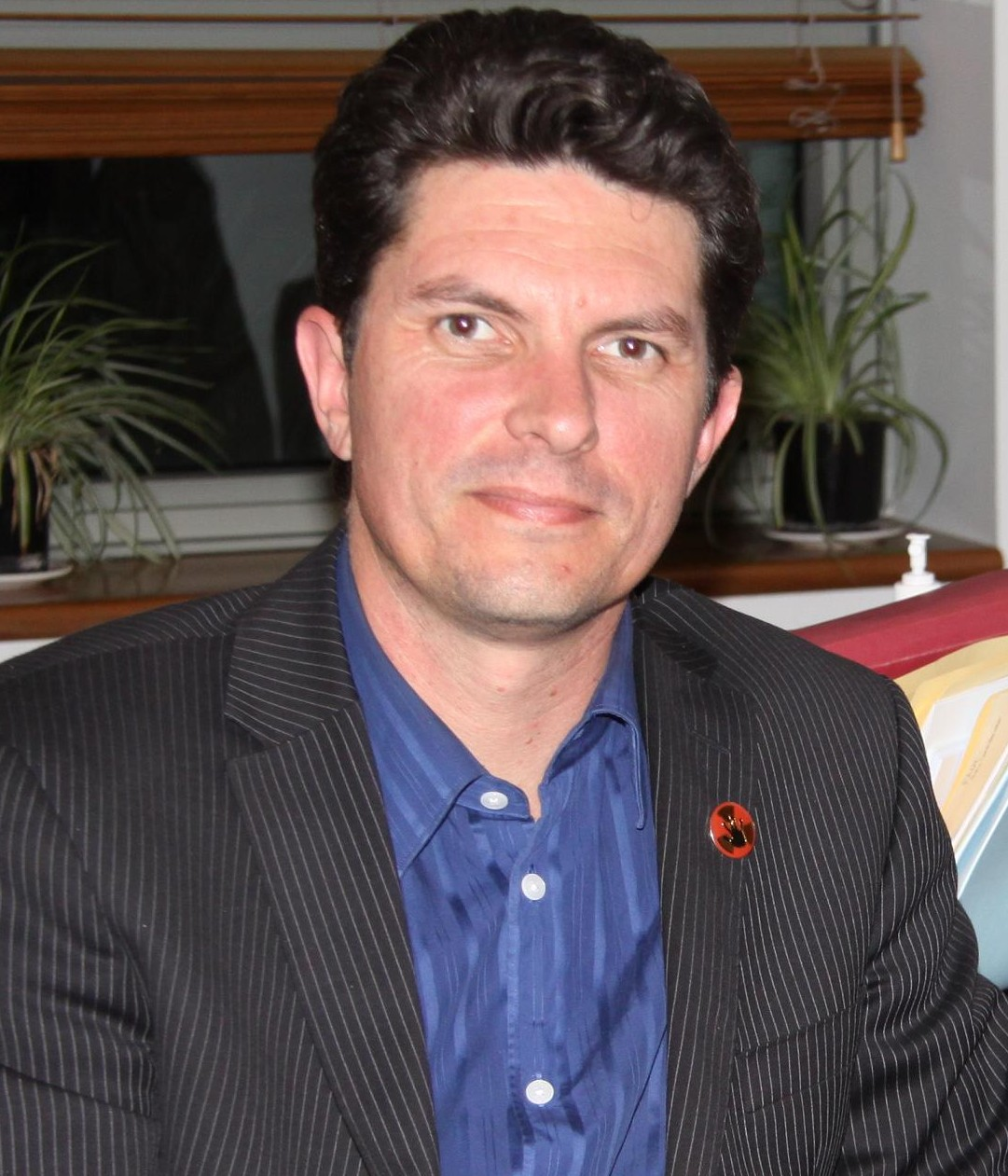
Ludlam at a Cluster Munition Coalition meeting in 2011

In 2011, he successfully advocated to restore $264 million to the National Rental Affordability Scheme which funded the construction of thousands of affordable rental homes.

A former film maker, artist and graphic designer by trade, Ludlam has employed some communications tools to help with campaigns. He created the Bike Blackspot App, a smart phone application that enabled cyclists to lobby for better bike funding. In 2007, he created a 30-minute documentary on why he believes nuclear energy is not the solution to climate change, titled "Climate of Hope".

At the 2014 Western Australian Senate election the Greens won in excess of a quota with the primary vote increasing from 9.5 to 15.6 percent, re-electing Ludlam.

On 6 May 2015, Ludlam was elected unopposed to serve as Deputy Leader of the Australian Greens, serving alongside Queensland senator Larissa Waters. This followed Christine Milne resigning her leadership of the party.

On 3 November 2016, Ludlam announced that he would be taking a leave of absence to seek treatment for depression and anxiety.

On 14 July 2017, Ludlam resigned from the Senate after it was brought to his attention by barrister John Cameron that he held dual Australian and New Zealand citizenship, rendering him ineligible to hold elected office in the Federal Parliament under section 44 of the Australian Constitution, becoming the first casualty of the 2017 Australian parliamentary eligibility crisis. Ludlam stated that he had previously assumed he lost his New Zealand citizenship when he naturalised as an Australian citizen in his mid-teens. Ludlam's resignation led to a number of MPs and Senators publicly clarifying their citizenship status, and also led to fellow Greens senator and deputy leader Larissa Waters's resignation four days later, after discovering she held Canadian citizenship.

On 7 October 2019, Ludlam was arrested at an Extinction Rebellion protest.

In May 2021 his book, Full Circle: A search for the world that comes next, was published by Black Inc.
