= 2014 Australian Senate special election in Western Australia =

Re-run of election due to lost ballot papers

2014 Western Australian Senate election
- 5 April 2014

6 (of 12) Western Australian Senate seats
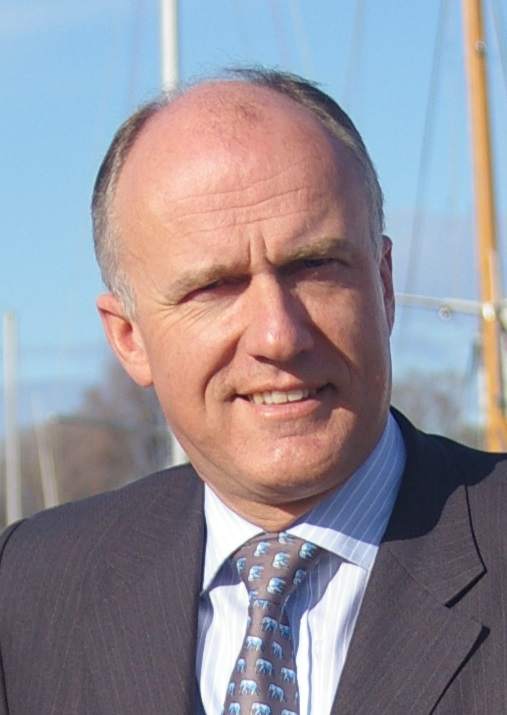

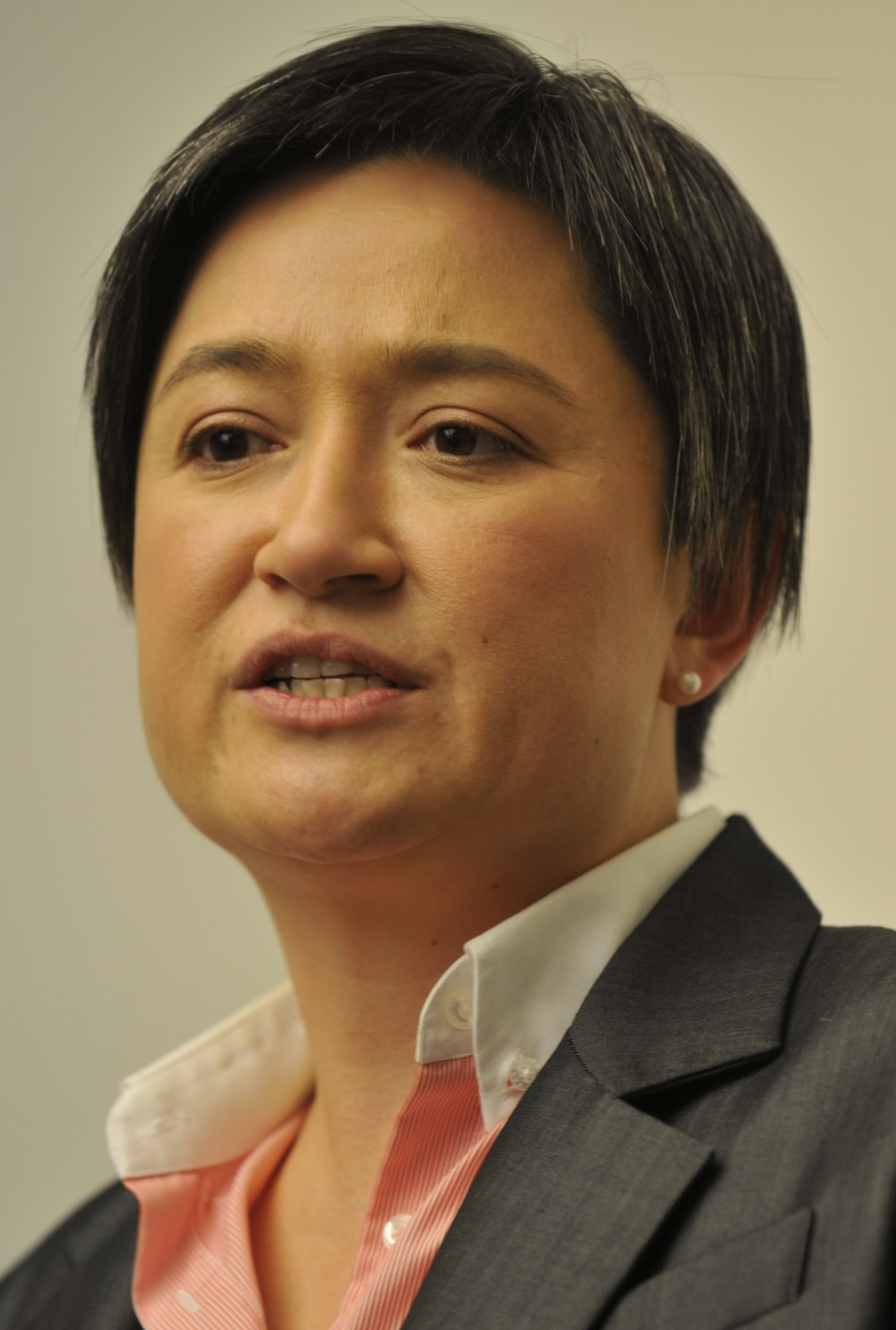

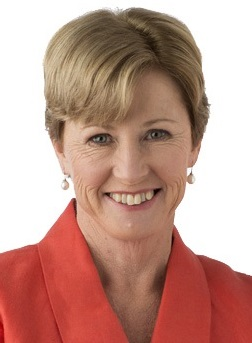

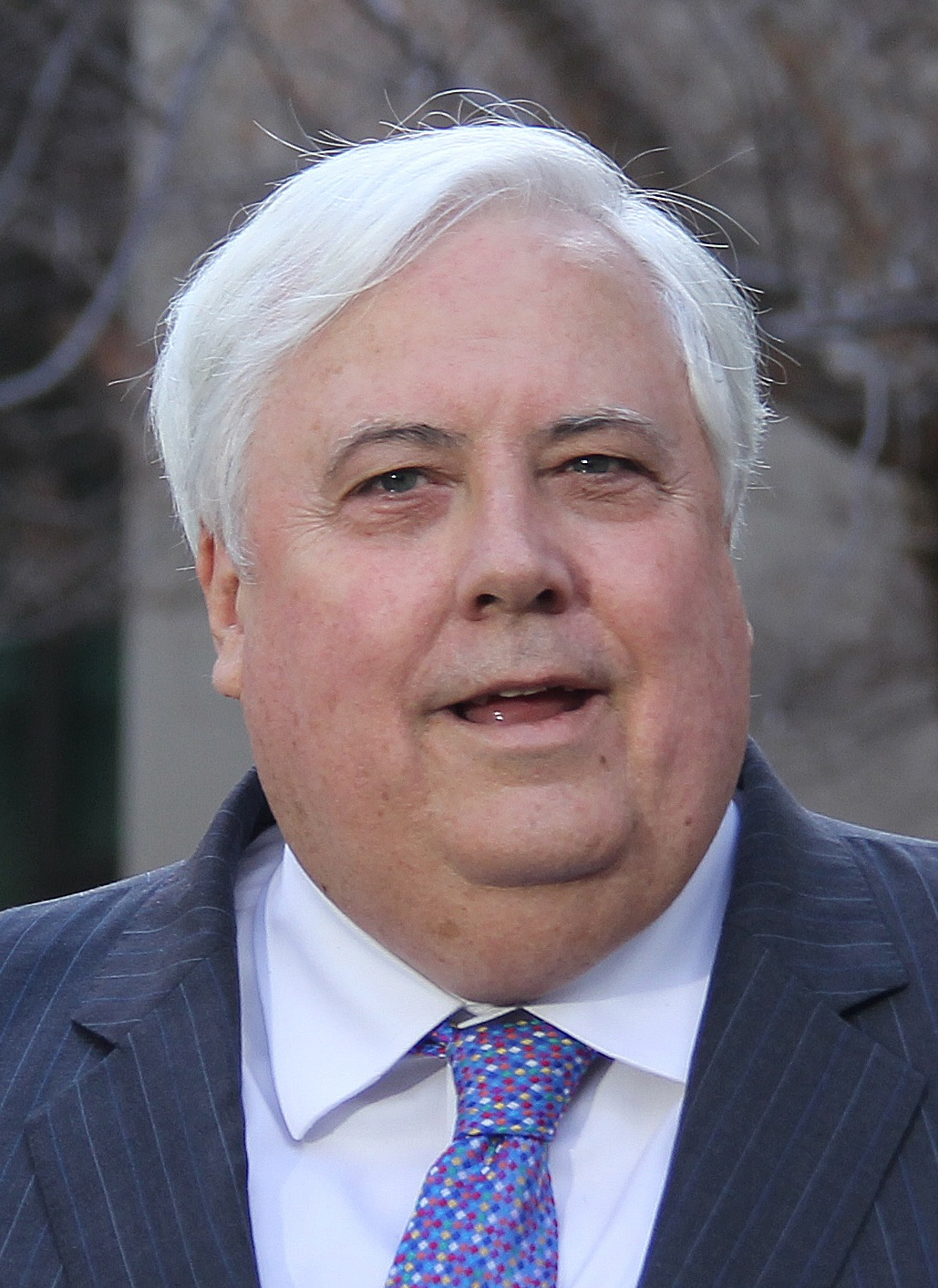
	First party	Second party
Leader	Eric Abetz	Penny Wong
Party	Liberal	Labor
Leader's seat	Tasmania	South Australia
Seats before	6	4
Seats won	3	1
Seats after	6	3
Seat change	Steady	▼1
Popular vote	435,220	275,094
Percentage	34.06%	21.53%
Swing	▼8.93pp	▼8.17pp
	Third party	Fourth party
Leader	Christine Milne	Clive Palmer
Party	Greens	Palmer United
Leader's seat	Tasmania	MP for Fairfax
Seats before	2	—
Seats won	1	1
Seats after	2	1
Seat change	Steady	New
Popular vote	199,538	157,740
Percentage	15.60%	12.34%
Swing	▲1.64pp	New

On 5 April 2014, an Australian Senate special election in Western Australia was held. The special election was held six months after the 2013 Australian federal election. The result of that 2013 election for the Australian Senate in Western Australia was voided on 20 February 2014 by the High Court of Australia, sitting as the Court of Disputed Returns, because 1,375 ballot papers were lost during an official recount in November 2013. The High Court ruled that because the number of lost ballots exceeded the margin for the two remaining Senate seats, the only acceptable remedy was to void the results and hold a special election.

Following the election on 5 April, preferences were distributed on 29 April 2014 according to the group voting ticket voting system used at that time. The outcome was 3 senators from the Liberal Party of Australia, 1 from the Australian Labor Party, 1 from the Australian Greens and 1 from the Palmer United Party. Compared to the November 2013 result, the Australian Sports Party's Wayne Dropulich was replaced by Dio Wang of the Palmer United Party.

The election is unprecedented in Australian federal politics. An election was held in South Australia in 1907 for the election of one senator under a previous electoral system. Half-Senate elections without a corresponding Australian House of Representatives election have occurred several times due to effluxion of time, the last one in 1970.

The date was set by Sir Peter Cosgrove, the Governor-General of Australia, on the advice of Prime Minister Tony Abbott. However, the onus for setting times and processes fell on the Governor of Western Australia, Malcolm McCusker, on the advice of Colin Barnett, Premier of Western Australia, in McCusker's obligations under the operation of the Election of Senators Act 1903 (WA).

== Result ==
=== Summary ===
Senate (STV GV) — Turnout 88.50% (CV) — Informal 2.50%
Party	Votes	%	Swing (Note: Swing is compared to the 2010 election.)	Seats won	Total seats	Change
Liberal Party of Australia	435,220	34.06	–8.93	3	6	Steady
Australian Labor Party	275,094	21.53	–8.17	1	3	▼1
Australian Greens	199,358	15.60	+1.64	1	2	Steady
Palmer United Party	157,740	12.34	+12.34	1	1	▲1
Nationals WA	38,818	3.04	–0.39			Steady
Other	171,574	13.43				Steady
Total	1,277,804			6	12	
Invalid/blank votes		32,757	2.50	–0.68		
Registered voters/turnout		1,480,820	88.50			
Source: Commonwealth Election 2013

=== Results in detail ===
2014 special election in Western Australia]]: Senate, Western Australia
Party	Candidate	Votes	%	±%
Quota		182,544		
Liberal	1. David Johnston (elected 1); 2. Michaelia Cash (elected 4); 3. Linda Reynolds (elected 6); 4. Slade Brockman	435,220	34.06	−8.93
Labor	1. Joe Bullock (elected 2); 2. Louise Pratt; 3. Shane Hill; 4. Klara Andric	275,094	21.53	−8.17
Greens	1. Scott Ludlam (elected 3); 2. Christine Cunningham; 3. Ian James; 4. Jordon Steele-John; 5. Sarah Nielsen-Harvey; 6. Judith Cullity	199,358	15.60	+1.64
Palmer United	1. Dio Wang (elected 5); 2. Des Headland; 3. Chamonix Terblanche	157,740	12.34	+12.34
National	1. Shane Van Styn; 2. Colin de Grussa	38,818	3.04	−0.39
Liberal Democrats	1. Jim Fryar; 2. Neil Hamilton	23,251	1.82	+0.64
Christians	1. Jamie Van Burgel; 2. Justin Moseley	19,649	1.54	+1.54
HEMP	1. James Moylan; 2. Tayla Moylan	13,579	1.06	+1.06
Shooters and Fishers	1. Murray Bow; 1. John Parkes	13,162	1.03	+0.43
Sex Party	1. Steve Palmer; 2. Mark Coleman	12,109	0.95	−1.30
Family First	1. Linda Rose; 2. Henry Heng	9,471	0.74	−0.41
Voluntary Euthanasia	1. Philip Nitschke; 2. Jim Duffield	8,598	0.67	+0.67
Animal Justice	1. Katrina Love; 2. Alicia Sutton	8,288	0.65	+0.65
Wikileaks	1. Tibor Meszaros; 2. Lucy Nicol	8,062	0.63	+0.63
Group C (Save our ABC)	1. Russell Woolf; 2. Verity James	7,779	0.61	
Motoring Enthusiasts	1. Richie Howlett; 2. Rob Zandvliet	6,995	0.55	+0.55
Pirate	1. Fletcher Boyd; 2. Michelle Allen	6,270	0.49	+0.49
Fishing and Lifestyle	1. Daniel McCarthy; 2. Suzzanne Wyatt	4,628	0.36	+0.36
Australian Sports	1. Wayne Dropulich; 2. Al Lackovic	4,166	0.33	+0.33
Smokers Rights	1. Max Katz-Barber; 2. Daniel Di Rado	3,609	0.28	+0.28
Democrats	1. Chris Fernandez; 2. William Thiel	3,492	0.27	−0.11
Stable Population	1. Peter Strachan; 2. William Bourke	3,063	0.24	+0.24
Outdoor Recreation	1. David Fishlock; 2. Joaquim De Lima	2,753	0.22	+0.22
Democratic Labour	1. Adrian Good; 2. Cathy Kiernan	2,727	0.21	+0.21
Rise Up Australia	1. Jane Foreman; 2. Joanne Bennett	2,224	0.17	+0.17
Katter's Australian	1. Phillip Bouwman; 2. Susan Hoddinott	1,182	0.09	+0.09
Building Australia	1. Ken Bezant; 2. Daniel Smee	1,047	0.08	+0.08
Australian Voice	1. Brian Parkes; 2. Sean Butler	1,002	0.08	+0.08
Secular	1. Simon Cuthbert; 2. Andrew Thompson	950	0.07	−0.01
Socialist Alliance	1. Alex Bainbridge; 2. Chris Jenkins	818	0.06	+0.06
Mutual Party	1. Anthony Fels; 2. Felly Chandra	842	0.07	+0.07
Freedom and Prosperity Party	1. Bill Koutalianos; 2. Leon Ashby	837	0.07	−0.09
Republican	1. Marcus Anderson; 2. Rohan Hollick	743	0.06	+0.06
Independent	Teresa van Lieshout	169	0.01	+0.01
Independent	Kim Mubarak	109	0.01	0.01
Total formal votes		1,277,804	97.50	
Informal votes		32,757	2.50	
Turnout		1,310,561	88.50	

Elected	#	Senator	Party
2014	1	David Johnston	Liberal
2014	2	Joe Bullock	Labor
2014	3	Scott Ludlam	Greens
2014	4	Michaelia Cash	Liberal
2014	5	Dio Wang	Palmer
2014	6	Linda Reynolds	Liberal
2010
2010	1	Mathias Cormann	Liberal
2010	2	Chris Evans	Labor
2010	3	Chris Back	Liberal
2010	4	Glenn Sterle	Labor
2010	5	Judith Adams	Liberal
2010	6	Rachel Siewert	Greens

The sixth and last seat was a close contest between third Liberal candidate Linda Reynolds and second Labor candidate Louise Pratt. Reynolds was ahead in the ABC's detailed count projection, with Antony Green predicting on 10 April "It is clear the Liberals will win the last seat". The result was confirmed by the Electoral Commission on 29 April. The score at the final count was 188,169 to Reynolds versus 176,042 for Pratt, a margin of 12,127. The projected margin on Green's calculator, which treated all votes as above-the-line, was a narrower 8,109.

== Revised national totals ==
Senators elected in the 2013 federal election and the WA special election

Revised national Senate totals following WA special election (STV GV) Turnout 93.45% (CV) – Informal 2.93%
Party	Votes	%	Swing	Seats won	Continuing senators	Total seats	Change
Liberal/National joint ticket (Note: The Liberal and National parties ran a joint ticket in New South Wales and Victoria. It includes the Liberal National Party in Queensland.)	3,938,204	29.43	–0.03	8	8	16	▼1
Liberal (Note: The Liberals-only ticket ran in Western Australia, South Australia, Tasmania and the Australian Capital Territory.)	928,291	6.94	–1.65	8	8	16	Steady
National (Note: The Nationals-only ticket ran in Western Australia and South Australia.)	41,920	0.31	–0.19	0	0	0	Steady
Country Liberal (NT)	42,781	0.32	–0.01	1	1	1	Steady
Coalition total	4,951,196	37.00	–1.29	17	16	33	▼1
Australian Labor Party	3,965,284	29.63	–5.50	12	13	25	▼6
Australian Greens	1,234,592	9.23	–3.88	4	6	10	▲1
Palmer United Party	751,121	5.61	+5.61	3	–	3	▲3
Liberal Democratic Party	502,180	3.75	+1.94	1	–	1	▲1
Xenophon Group	258,376	1.93	+1.93	1	–	1	Steady
Family First Party	149,994	1.12	–0.98	1	–	1	▲1
Democratic Labour Party	115,276	0.86	–0.20	0	1	1	Steady
Australian Motoring Enthusiast Party	66,807	0.50	+0.50	1	–	1	▲1
Other	1,385,719	10.36	+0.49				
Total	13,380,545			40	36	76	
Invalid/blank votes	403,380	2.93	–0.82				
Registered voters/turnout	14,750,392	93.45					
Source: Commonwealth Election 2013

== Candidates ==
There were a number of candidate changes from the original election. Notable changes included:

- Shane Hill replaced Peter Foster as third candidate on the Labor ticket
- David Wirrpanda was no longer on the Nationals ticket
- Des Headland assumed second place on the Palmer United ticket
- Anthony Fels switched from lead Katter's Australian Party candidate to lead Mutual Party candidate
- Fiona Patten, who was the lead Sex Party candidate in Victoria in 2013, became their lead candidate at the special election

The Socialist Equality Party and Australian Independents contested the 2013 election in Western Australia, but did not contest the special election. The Socialist Alliance, Pirate Party, Voluntary Euthanasia Party, Building Australia Party, Mutual Party, Republican Party and Democratic Labor Party did not contest the 2013 election in WA, but decided to contest the special election.

Sitting members are shown in bold text. Tickets that elected at least one member in 2014 are highlighted in the relevant colour and successful candidates are indicated with an asterisk (*). Candidates marked with ‡ were declared elected after the final count in 2013.

Labor candidates	Liberal candidates	Greens candidates	Palmer candidates	Nationals candidates	Katter candidates
1. Joe Bullock‡*; 2. **Louise Pratt**; 3. Shane Hill; 4. Klara Andric	1. **David Johnston**‡*; 2. **Michaelia Cash**‡*; 3. Linda Reynolds‡*; 4. Slade Brockman	1. **Scott Ludlam**‡*; 2. Christine Cunningham; 3. Ian James; 4. Jordon Steele-John; 5. Sarah Nielsen-Harvey; 6. Judith Cullity	1. Dio Wang*; 2. Des Headland; 3. Chamonix Terblanche	1. Shane Van Styn; 2. Colin de Grussa	1. Phillip Bouwman; 2. Susan Hoddinott
Shooters & Fishers candidates	Christians candidates	Family First candidates	Australian Sex Party candidates	Wikileaks candidates	Liberal Democrats candidates
1. Murray Bow; 2. John Parkes	1. Ray Moran; 2. Justin Moseley	1. Linda Rose; 2. Henry Heng	1. Fiona Patten; 2. Mark Coleman	1. Tibor Meszaros; 2. Lucy Nicol	1. Jim Fryar; 2. Neil Hamilton
Democrats candidates	Smokers' Rights candidates	HEMP candidates	Socialist Alliance candidates	Voice candidates	Fishing & Lifestyle candidates
1. Chris Fernandez; 2. William Thiel	1. Max Katz-Barber; 2. Daniel Di Rado	1. James Moylan; 2. Tayla Moylan	1. Alex Bainbridge; 2. Chris Jenkins	1. Brian Parkes; 2. Sean Butler	1. Daniel McCarthy; 2. Suzzanne Wyatt
Secular candidates	Pirate candidates	Freedom & Prosperity candidates	Sustainable Population candidates	Outdoor Recreation candidates	Animal Justice candidates
1. Simon Cuthbert; 2. Andrew Thompson	1. Fletcher Boyd; 2. Michelle Allen	1. Bill Koutalianos; 2. Leon Ashby	1. Peter Strachan; 2. William Bourke	1. David Fishlock; 2. Joaquim De Lima	1. Katrina Love; 2. Alicia Sutton
Motoring Enthusiast candidates	Sports candidates	Rise Up Australia candidates	Voluntary Euthanasia candidates	Building Australia candidates	Mutual candidates
1. Richie Howlett; 2. Rob Zandvliet	1. Wayne Dropulich‡; 2. Al Lackovic	1. Jane Foreman; 2. Joanne Bennett	1. Philip Nitschke; 2. Jim Duffield	1. Ken Bezant; 2. Daniel Smee	1. Anthony Fels; 2. Felly Chandra
Republican candidates	DLP candidates	Group C candidates	Ungrouped candidates		
1. Marcus Anderson; 2. Rohan Hollick	1. Adrian Good; 2. Cathy Kiernan	1. Russell Woolf; 2. Verity James	Teresa van Lieshout (Ind); Kim Mubarak (Ind)		

== Electoral events timeline ==
- 7 September 2013 (Election Day) – The Liberal-National Coalition defeats the Australian Labor Party.
- 17 October – A recount of all "above-the-line" Senate votes made in Western Australia is initiated after an appeal by the WA Greens and the Australian Sports Party is upheld.
- 31 October 2013 – The AEC announces that it is unable to find 1,375 ballot papers during the WA Senate recount.
- 4 November 2013 – The AEC declares the result of the WA Senate recount, awarding the last two seats to the Greens and Australian Sports Party, instead of the ALP and Palmer United Party.
- 15 November 2013 – The AEC, Palmer United candidate Wang, and voter Simon Mead lodge a petition with the High Court of Australia in its capacity as the Court of Disputed Returns, asking that the WA Senate result be declared null and void.
- January 2014 – Justice Kenneth Hayne, in the Court of Disputed Returns, hears submissions from the AEC and political parties. On 30 January 2014, Hayne reserved his decision.
- 20 February 2014 – The Court of Disputed Returns voids the results of the WA Senate election. Hayne ruled that the margins between Palmer United and the Australian Sports Party for the fifth seat and the Greens and ALP for the sixth seat were far exceeded by the number of missing ballots. Hayne ruled that since the voters who cast those missing ballots had effectively been "prevented from voting", no remedy short of a new election was appropriate.
- 21 February 2014 – Electoral Commissioner Ed Killesteyn announces his resignation, which will take effect on 4 July 2014.
- 28 February 2014 – McCusker announced the election date as Saturday 5 April 2014
- 13 March 2014 – closing date for nomination of candidates.
- 5 April 2014 – election day.

== 2013 Senate result background ==
The Senate after the 2013 election, once the new senators' terms started on 1 July 2014, was originally going to consist of the Coalition government on 33 seats with the Labor opposition on 25 seats and a record crossbench of 18 – the Greens on ten seats, Palmer United on two seats, with other minor parties and independents on six seats – the LDP's David Leyonhjelm, Family First's Bob Day, Motoring's Ricky Muir, Sports Party's Wayne Dropulich and incumbents Nick Xenophon and the DLP's John Madigan. The Coalition government would originally have required the support of at least six non-coalition Senators to pass legislation.

Most Senate votes cast in Western Australia were subject to a formal recount. During the recount it was determined that 1,375 WA Senate ballot papers could not be located. After the final recount the result was duly declared which changed the last two predicted WA Senate spots from Palmer and Labor back to Sports Party and Greens. Mick Keelty, a former AFP Commissioner, was requested by the AEC to investigate the issue of the misplaced ballot papers. On 15 November, the AEC petitioned the High Court, acting as the Court of Disputed Returns, to seek an order from the court that the WA Senate election of all six senators (3 Liberal, 1 Labor, 1 Green, 1 Sports Party) be declared void.

Given the closeness of the margins that favoured the final two declared candidates, the petition is based on the premise that the inability to include 1,370 missing ballot papers in the recount of the WA Senate election means that the election was likely to be affected for the purposes of s 362(3) of the Commonwealth Electoral Act 1918.

— Australian Electoral Commission, 15 November 2013

A record number of candidates stood at the election. Group voting tickets came under scrutiny because multiple candidates were provisionally elected with the vast majority of their 14.3 percent quotas coming from the preferences of other parties across the political spectrum. "Preference whisperer" Glenn Druery organised tight cross-preferencing between many minor parties. The Sports Party's Wayne Dropulich won a Senate seat on a record-low primary vote of 0.2 percent in Western Australia, his party placing coming 21st out of 28 groups on primary votes. The result caused discussion across a range of organisations and parties about whether there should be changes to the GVT system.
