= Smokers' Rights Party =

- Spokesperson: Clinton Mead
- Ideology: Single-issue politics

Website
- smokersrights.org.au

The Smokers' Rights Party (SRP) was a registered political party in Australia from 2013 until September 2017.

== History ==
The party was created in order to feed preferences to David Leyonhjelm of the Liberal Democratic Party. With the abolition of group voting tickets in 2016, the Smokers' Rights Party was no longer able to act as a preference feeder, and published a statement recommending that supporters vote for Leyonhjelm in the Senate. It was formally deregistered in September 2017.

The Smokers' Rights Party states that it does not receive funding from the tobacco industry. Despite this, the Liberal Democrats do, having received at least $35,000 from Philip Morris in the 2013–2014 financial year.

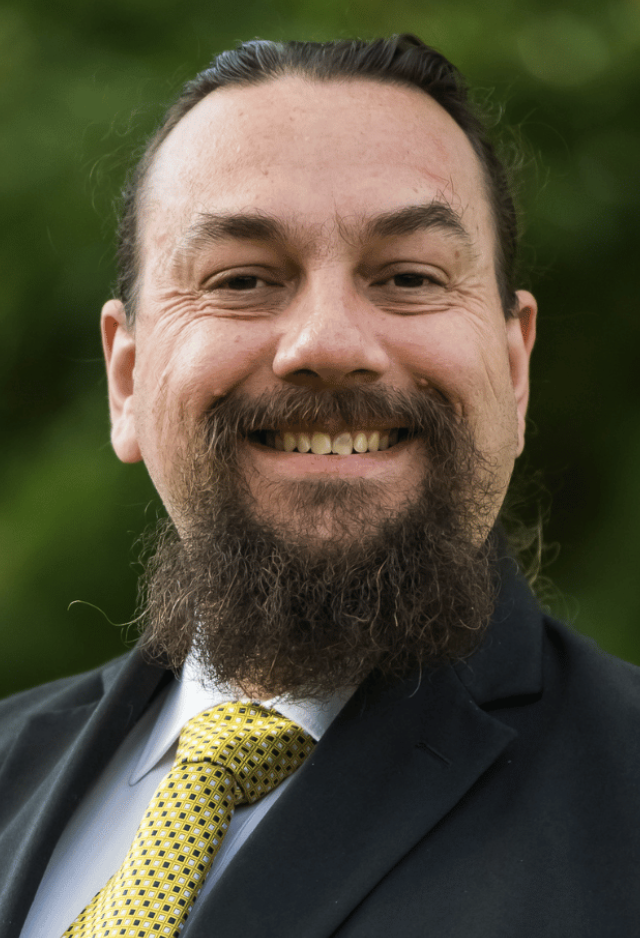
Joaquim De Lima, the SRP's final candidate

Smokers Rights fielded only one candidate in the 2016 federal election. This was Joaquim De Lima as a candidate for the Division of Fowler in the House of Representatives. De Lima had previously run as a candidate for the Outdoor Recreation Party (NSW 2011 for Penrith, 2013 Senate NSW, 2014 senate WA, 2015 NSW upper house), and the Liberal Democrats (Federal 2010 for Greenway).

== See also ==
- Smoking in Australia
- WIN Party
- List of political parties in Australia
