= Mutual Party =

Australian political party

The Mutual Party (previously the Bank Reform Party) is a de-registered minor political party in Australia.

The party has been involved in Glenn Druery's Minor Party Alliance.

The party's lead candidate for the Senate in Western Australia at the 2014 special election was Anthony Fels, who has been a Liberal (and later independent) member of the Western Australian Legislative Council, and an independent and Katter's Australian Party Senate candidate at the 2010 and 2013 federal elections, respectively.

In March 2015, the Australian Progressive Party (not to be confused with the similarly named Australian Progressives) announced that it had absorbed the Mutual Party after they agreed to join forces.

The Mutual Party was deregistered in April 2015, according to the Australian Electoral Commission.

== See also ==
- List of political parties in Australia
