= Rise Up Australia Party =

- Leader: Danny Nalliah
- Founded: 22 June 2011
- Dissolved: 26 June 2019
- Headquarters: 23 Melverton Drive, Hallam, Victoria, 3803
- Ideology: Australian nationalism Conservatism; Social conservatism Right-wing populism Christian right Anti-Islam
- Political position: Far-right
- Colours: Red, white, blue
- Slogan: Keep Australia Australian
- Casey City Council: 1 / 11 (2012−2019)

Website
- riseupaustralia.com.au

The Rise Up Australia Party (RUAP) was a far-right political party in Australia. The party's policy platform was focused on nationalist and Christian conservative issues, such as opposing Islamic immigration and religious freedom for Australian Muslims and opposition to same-sex marriage in Australia. The party was launched in 2011 and was led by Pentecostal minister Danny Nalliah until its dissolution in June 2019. Its slogan was "Keep Australia Australian". Nalliah is the president of Catch the Fire Ministries.

The Rise Up Australia Party received 0.4% of the nationwide Senate vote at the 2013 federal election, 0.3% of the nationwide Senate vote at the 2016 federal election, and 0.44% of the nationwide Senate vote at the 2019 federal election. The party had one councillor, Rosalie Crestani, on the City of Casey in Victoria.

== Policies and philosophy ==
The aims of the party included opposition to multiculturalism, preserving Australia's "Judeo-Christian heritage" and cuts to Australia's "Muslim intake", as well as the protection of Australian ownership, freedom of speech, and freedom of religion.

Before the 2009 Black Saturday bushfires in Victoria which claimed 173 lives, Nalliah claimed to have had a warning dream from God: that His protection would be removed from Victoria, if the Church did not repent and seek God regarding their apathy towards the passing of a Bill that resulted in the "slaughter of innocent children up to full term in the womb." In a similar vein, Nalliah also linked the catastrophic 2010–2011 Queensland floods to remarks Kevin Rudd made about Israel. Nalliah declared on his website "...at once I was reminded of Kevin Rudd speaking against Israel in Israel on 14th December 2010. It is very interesting that Kevin Rudd is from QLD. Is God trying to get our attention? Yes, I believe so."

The party voiced support for the state of Israel, stating in its policy platform "[we] support the right of the State of Israel to exist within secure and defensible borders, and with Jerusalem as its undivided capital".

In a 2011 interview with Perth's Out in Perth, Nalliah stated that homosexuals can be turned back to heterosexual relationships through education and through faith in Christ. " ... while we love the homosexual community and want to get to know them better, we also have a stand, where we say, children need to be protected (from alternative lifestyles). There are times in life when you do things, and maybe you feel yes you are locked into an agenda.... our position is that homosexuality is not OK" and that "Children should not be exposed to [public displays of homosexual affection] and other practices that go beyond morality." The Party also stated that there will be a "homosexual marriage onslaught across the state" if same-sex marriage legislation was passed.

The party's energy policy also claimed that Australia's coal-fired power stations are 42% energy efficient, and proposed the repeal of the carbon tax if elected in 2013. The party stated that there needs to be an overhaul of Australia's media content laws, restricting content that is immoral and violent, as well as "socially-degenerating themes". It supported animal welfare issues such as free range farming and banning of live exports and animal testing.

== History ==
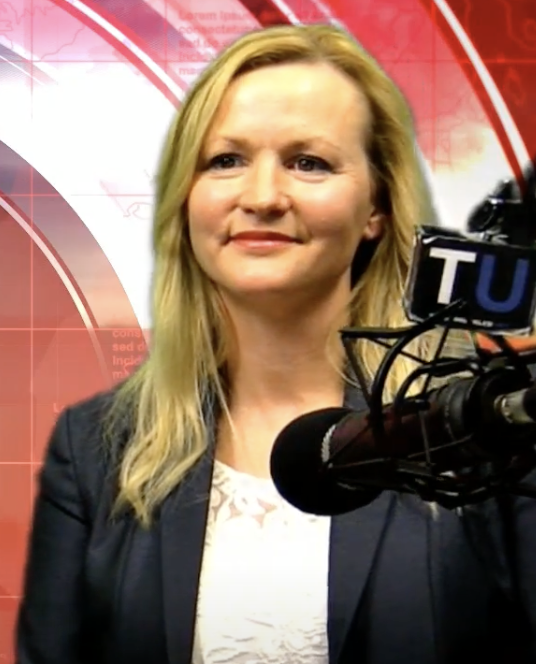
RUAP councillor Rosalie Crestani

Daniel Nalliah founded the Rise Up Australia Party on 22 June 2011. He had previously been a candidate for the Australian Senate in the 2004 federal election for the Family First Party. It is said he left that party due to demeaning statements about minority groups. The party was launched with the help of Christopher Monckton, who assisted Nalliah and the party in their campaign to run 93 candidates, both in the House of Representatives and the senate in the 2013 federal election.

The party was involved in Glenn Druery's Minor Party Alliance (MPA).

In March 2015, the party's Facebook page, which had 6,000 followers, was banned and suspended on Facebook for 24 hours because of what was called "hateful speech" content. It was the first Australian political party page to have been temporarily banned from Facebook.

The party was voluntarily deregistered in June 2019.

=== Electoral performance ===
The party received 49,341 primary votes or 0.37% of the nationwide Senate vote at the 2013 federal election.

At the 2016 federal election, the party fielded two senate candidates in each of the Australian Capital Territory, New South Wales, Northern Territory, Queensland, Victoria and Western Australia, and 31 candidates for the House of Representatives, including 18 in Victoria. The party received 36,472 votes or 0.26% of the nationwide Senate vote and failed to gain any seats in the election. However, it did manage to gain 4% – 7% in six House of Representatives seats and in the Northern Territory Senate.

At the 2019 Australian federal election, the party drew first position in Queensland and New South Wales Senate tickets. Following the election, on 26 June 2019, the party was voluntarily deregistered by the Australian Electoral Commission.

== Federal parliament ==
House of Representatives
Election year	# of overall votes	% of overall vote	# of overall seats won	+/–
2013	48,582	0.38(#9/32)	0 / 150	▲0
2016	68,418	0.51(#10/45)	0 / 150	▲0
2019	14,032	0.10 (#18/35)	0 / 150	▼0

Senate
Election year	# of overall votes	% of overall vote	# of overall seats won	# of overall seats	+/–
2013	49,341	0.37(#20/49)	0 / 40	0 / 76	▲0
2016	36,472	0.26(#24/49)	0 / 40	0 / 76	▼0
2019	64,344	0.44(#15/45)	0 / 40	0 / 76	▲0

=== State Election ===
Victorian Legislative Assembly
Election year	# of overall votes	% of overall vote	# of overall seats won	+/–
2014	20,795	0.62(#8/16)	0 / 88	▲0

Victorian Legislative Council
Election year	# of overall votes	% of overall vote	# of overall seats won	# of overall seats	+/–
2014	17,674	0.52(#15/19)	0 / 40	0 / 76	▲0

== See also ==
- Danny Nalliah
- Family First Party
- Far-right politics in Australia
