= Australian Voice Party =

Defunct Australian political party

- President: Keith Douglas (2013); Jamie Cavanough (2014−2015); Rick Boskma (2018)
- Secretary: Bevan Collingwood
- Founder: Jamie Cavanough
- Registered: 2 July 2013; 11 years ago
- Ideology: Anti-Islam
- Political position: Right-wing

The Australian Voice Party (AVP) was a right-wing Australian political party. It was registered with the Australian Electoral Commission on 2 July 2013 and deregistered on 23 July 2015, although its website remains online as of November 2024.

== History ==
The AVP endorsed candidates in New South Wales, Victoria, Queensland and Western Australia at the 2013 federal election. The party also contested the 2014 special Senate election in Western Australia, receiving 0.08% of the vote.

Following the 2013 election, the party elected a new leadership team, with Jamie Cavanough as president and Bevan Collingwood as national secretary. Cavanough resigned as president and from the party on 28 February 2015.

The AVP was deregistered by the AEC on 23 July 2015 after failing to provide it had the 500 members required for registration. It was not re-registered in time for the 2016 federal election.

In 2018, the party elected a new leadership team for the 2019 federal election, with Rick Boskma as president. However, it ultimately did not contest the election.

As of November 2024, the AVP website remains online.
