= Stop CSG Party =

- Founded: 23 July 2013; 13 years ago
- Dissolved: 17 March 2015; 11 years ago
- Ideology: Anti-coal seam gas

The Stop CSG Party (Coal Seam Gas) was an Australian political party that ran candidates in the 2013 federal election.

The party was involved in Glenn Druery's Minor Party Alliance (MPA).

The party was deregistered by the Australian Electoral Commission in March 2015, after failing to respond to the AEC's notice to confirm eligibility for registration.

== See also ==
- List of political parties in Australia
