= Joe Bullock =

Australian politician

Senator for Western Australia
- In office 1 July 2014 – 13 April 2016
- Succeeded by: Pat Dodson

Personal details
- Born: 13 April 1955 (age 71) Sydney, New South Wales
- Party: Liberal (2018–present); Labor (1979–2018)
- Spouse: Helen Bullock
- Occupation: Trade union official

Joseph Warrington Bullock (born 13 April 1955) is a former Australian politician. He was a member of the Australian Senate for the state of Western Australia from 2013 to 2016, representing the Australian Labor Party.

== Education and career ==
Bullock was born in Sydney and was educated at Trinity Grammar, an Anglican school, and the University of Sydney. He was a friend of former Australian Prime Minister Tony Abbott and suggested Abbott join the Liberal Party.

Bullock moved to Western Australia and became Assistant Secretary of the Shop, Distributive and Allied Employees Association (SDA) in 1986. He became Western Australian state secretary of the union in 1996. He was National Vice-president of the union from 2004 to 2014. The SDA is one of the largest unions affiliated to the Labor Party and is influential in the party's right-wing faction.

== Political career ==
As state secretary of the SDA, Bullock wielded considerable power in the WA branch of the Labor Party. He was influential in blocking Labor support of Sunday trading in WA, which the SDA opposes. He also unsuccessfully opposed changing Labor's policy to support same-sex marriage.

Bullock ran for the state Legislative Assembly at the 1994 Helena by-election, caused by the resignation of former Labor minister Gordon Hill. The Labor Party suffered a negative swing of 2.3 points, which was enough to cost them the seat. Richard Court's Liberal government became the first state government since 1943 to increase their majority at a by-election.

In the lead-up to the 2013 Australian federal election Bullock reportedly secured a deal with the secretary of United Voice, Dave Kelly, whereby Bullock would take the number one position from left-aligned Senator Louise Pratt in exchange for Kelly's choice of Sue Lines to fill the Senate seat vacated by Chris Evans. Bullock was elected to the Senate as the lead candidate on Labor's ticket in Western Australia, but in February 2014 the High Court of Australia ruled the election void. A special election to elect Western Australia's senators was held on 5 April 2014, with Bullock again being elected. His term commenced on 1 July 2014.

Bullock was blamed by figures from Labor's left faction for the party's poor showing in the Senate re-vote. United Voice, a left-wing union, called for Bullock to resign his Senate place. The Labor member for Bassendean, Martin Whitely, quit the Labor party in 2013 in protest over Bullock's pre-selection for the federal Senate election that year.

During the campaign for the 2014 WA Senate election, details of Bullock's speech given at a function in November 2013 were made public. In the speech, Bullock criticised fellow senate candidate Louise Pratt and described some members of the Labor Party as "untrustworthy" and "mad." Bullock issued an apology before the election.

On 1 March 2016, Bullock announced that he was resigning from the Senate after less than two years in the parliament. He cited the Labor Party's policy to bind parliamentary members to voting to support same-sex marriage after 2019, among other reasons, for his resignation.

Bullock tendered his resignation to Senate President Stephen Parry on 13 April 2016.

== Personal life ==
Bullock is a member of the Anglican Church. His wife, Helen Bullock, represented the Mining and Pastoral region in the Legislative Council of Western Australia from 2009 to her retirement in 2013. Unusually for a Labor Party politician, Bullock is opposed to Australian republicanism, and spoke at the 2014 national conference of the Australian Monarchist League.

In May 2018, Bullock moved to Launceston, Tasmania and joined the Liberal Party.
