= Mehmet Tillem =

Australian politician (1974–2019)

Senator for Victoria
- In office 21 August 2013 – 30 June 2014
- Preceded by: David Feeney

Personal details
- Born: 10 September 1974 Tavas, Turkey
- Died: 9 November 2019 (aged 45) Melbourne, Australia
- Citizenship: Australian
- Party: Australian Labor Party
- Spouse: Ferda Tillem
- Children: 1
- Occupation: Research manager, ministerial advisor

Mehmet Tillem (10 September 1974 – 9 November 2019) was an Australian politician who served as Senator for Victoria from August 2013 until June 2014 as a member of the Australian Labor Party.

Tillem filled a casual vacancy caused by the resignation of Senator David Feeney, but was defeated at the 2013 federal election, and left parliament at the conclusion of his term. He was the first Turkish-born member of the Australian parliament.

Tillem died on 9 November 2019 from cardiac arrest. He was 45.
