= Chris Back =

Australian politician

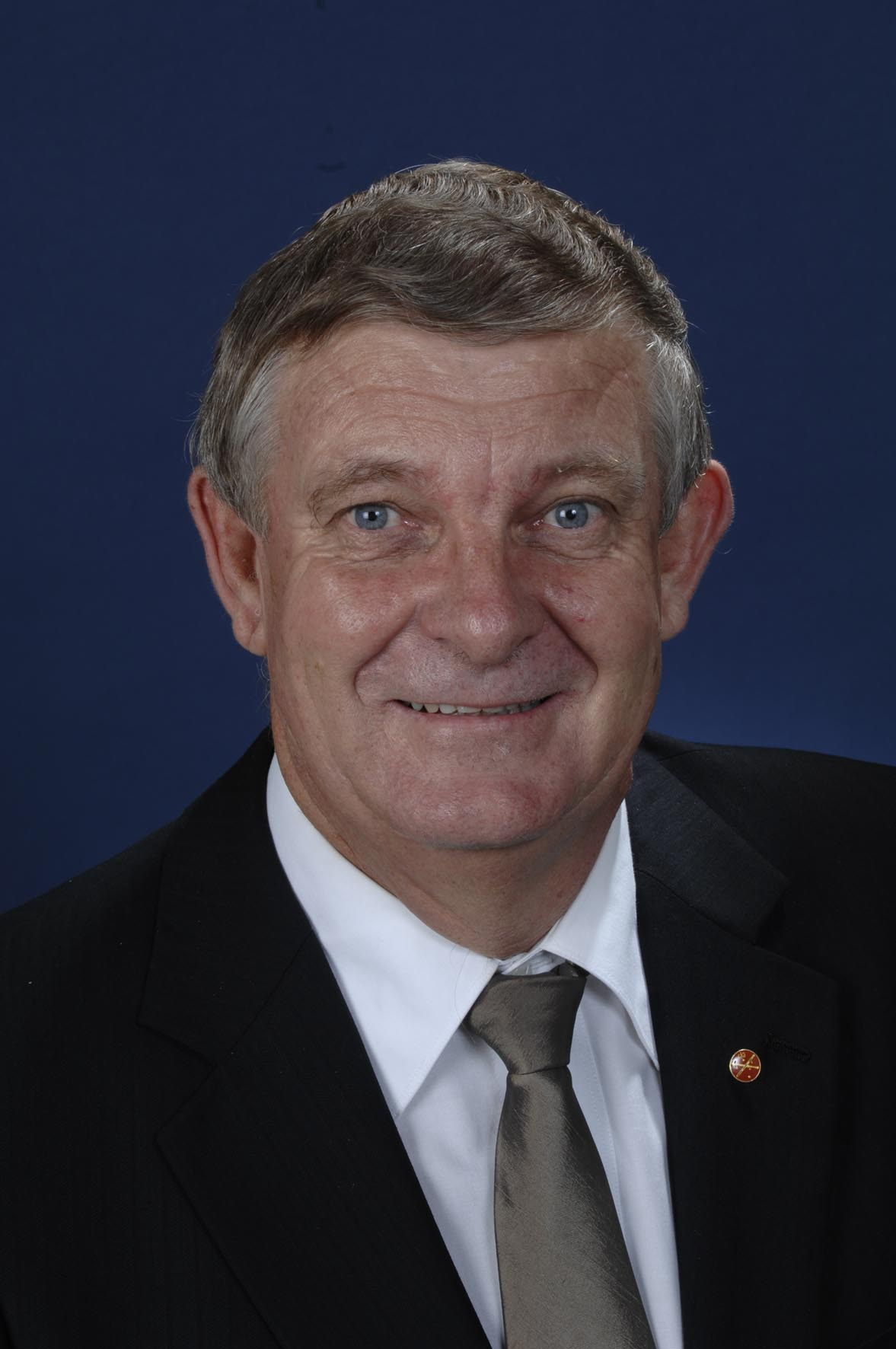

Senator for Western Australia
- In office 12 March 2009 – 31 July 2017
- Preceded by: Chris Ellison
- Succeeded by: Slade Brockman

Personal details
- Born: 11 February 1950 (age 76) Perth, Western Australia
- Party: Liberal Party of Australia
- Spouse: Linda
- Children: 3
- Education: University of Queensland
- Profession: Veterinarian
- Website: www.chrisback.com.au

Christopher John Back (born 11 February 1950) is a former Australian politician, who was a Liberal Party member of the Australian Senate for Western Australia from 2009 until his resignation in 2017.

== Early life and education ==
Back was born in Perth and was educated at Aquinas College, Perth.

In 1971, he graduated from the University of Queensland and was then posted to Merredin as a Veterinary Officer in 1972. He served there until being transferred to Moora in 1974. In the middle of that year, Back resigned and went into racehorse practice in Caulfield, Victoria.

Back lectured in Animal Science and Production at Curtin University (Muresk Institute) from 1975 to 1988. During this period, he also spent time at the University of California in 1980 and 1984, working in the Department of Equine Reproduction. At Muresk, Back developed Australia’s first tertiary course in Equine Management in 1977. Graduates were then able to find a range of employment internationally because of this. In a change of career direction, he was then appointed as the first CEO of the Rottnest Island Authority and served for seven years in the mid-1990s. Back was then CEO of the WA Bush Fires Board. In this role, Back introduced water bombing aircraft and updated volunteer equipment. He received the Prime Minister's Gold Award for technological achievement recognising the work undertaken in using satellites to track wildfires in remote locations. Back then moved to Tasmania and purchased the wholesale and retail businesses of Shell, which was his introduction to the Oil and Gas industry. He continued to work in Australia, South East Asia, India and the Middle East servicing oil majors and military clients and subsequently assisting in the establishment of a multi-national oil and gas services company until 2008.

In 2012, he was awarded the Kendall Prize by the Australian Veterinary Association for his service to the profession in Australia.

== Political career ==
In 2009, Back was appointed by a joint sitting of the Western Australian Parliament to replace Chris Ellison, who had resigned that January. Back was sworn into the Senate as a Liberal Senator for Western Australia on 11 March 2009. He was the first veterinarian elected to the Senate of the Federal Parliament.

In the 44th Parliament, Back was chairman of the Foreign Affairs, Defence and Trade Legislative Committee. Before that he was chairman of Education, Employment and Workplace Relations References Committee, and actively contributed to the Rural Affairs and Transport committee, where his main focus centred around biosecurity, food and animal health, and the welfare of agricultural industries generally. He was a member of the Joint Parliamentary Committee on Gambling Reform and involved in multiple hearings, including: animal welfare standards in Australia’s live export markets; reform of the Australian Federation; and a review of the Professional Services Review (PSR) Scheme. He was Deputy Whip in the Senate in 2012.

On 13 June 2017, Back announced his intention to resign from the Senate, with the following sitting week to be his last. In July, the WA Liberal Party preselected Slade Brockman to be appointed in Back's place.

He delayed his resignation until 31 July 2017.

== Personal life ==
Back married in 1974 and has three children, Elizabeth, Michael and Justin. Justin, his youngest son relocated to the US and currently serves as President of Acadian Ambulance https://acadianambulance.com/our-company/leadership/ Chris lives with his wife Linda in Perth, Western Australia.
