= Wayne Dropulich =

Australian politician

Senator-elect for Western Australia
- In office 7 September 2013 – 18 February 2014

Personal details
- Born: 1970 or 1971 (age 55–56)
- Party: Australian Sports Party (2013–2015)
- Occupation: Civil engineer

Wayne Dropulich (born 1970 or 1971) is an Australian former politician who was elected to the Senate as a member of the Australian Sports Party in the final count of the 2013 federal election prior to the Western Australian Senate count being declared void by the Court of Disputed Returns. Dropulich nominated for the special Senate election for Western Australia held on 5 April 2014, but failed to win a seat.

== Background ==
Dropulich, a Perth-based civil engineer and mining project manager who formerly worked at Rio Tinto, conceived the idea to form his own political party with the help of friends in early 2013. The former gridiron player for the Australian representative team achieved the required 500 members for his Australian Sports Party to be eligible for party status by asking friends and acquaintances to join. Dropulich has said that he had been in interested in politics his whole life despite having never been a member of a political party. Following his initial election, he received criticism for his non-committal stance towards a range of political issues.

== 2013 federal election ==
Although he received only 1,908 first preference votes in the 2013 federal election, under the single transferable vote system in place for Senate elections he was able to gain the required 123,304 votes to meet the Senate quota in Western Australia. The Australian Sports Party had been involved in preference swap deals organised by Glenn Druery as part of the Minor Party Alliance. Initially, Dropulich did not win a seat, but was elected to the Senate upon a recount of the ballots.

The Australian Electoral Commission admitted to losing a significant number of Western Australian Senate ballots prior to them being counted, which resulted in the election being referred to the High Court sitting as the Court of Disputed Returns. Dropulich spent 114 days as a senator-elect, until the High Court declared void the Western Australian Senate results on 18 February 2014.

Dropulich stood again for election on the Australian Sports Party ticket at the Western Australia special Senate election in 2014 but did not win a seat.

He subsequently opened his own mortgage-broking business in Perth, Senator Finance.
