= Australian Sports Party =

- Founded: 2013
- Dissolved: 2015
- Senate: 1 / 76 (2013−2014)

The Australian Sports Party was a registered federal political party of Australia formed in 2013 and officially deregistered in August 2015. The party aimed "for every Australian to be involved in sport and recreation to assist in living a healthy and enjoyable lifestyle in a strong community." It contested the Senate election of 2013 and succeeded in having Wayne Dropulich elected as a senator for Western Australia before that state's Senate count was declared void. The party failed to win a seat at the 2014 Western Australian Senate election held on 5 April 2014. The party was involved in Glenn Druery's Minor Party Alliance which aimed to assist election of minor-party candidates through manipulation of preferential-vote flows in conformity with the official voting regulations.
