= Dio Wang =

Australian politician

Whip of the Palmer United Party in the Senate
- In office 19 November 2014 – 12 March 2015
- Leader: Glenn Lazarus
- Preceded by: Office established
- Succeeded by: Office abolished

Leader of the Palmer United Party in Western Australia
- In office 1 April 2013 – 12 March 2015
- Deputy: Chamonix Terblanche
- Preceded by: Office established
- Succeeded by: Office abolished

Senator for Western Australia
- In office 1 July 2014 – 2 July 2016
- Preceded by: Louise Pratt
- Succeeded by: Rod Culleton

Personal details
- Born: Wáng Zhènyà (王振亚); 20 January 1981 (age 45) Nanjing, China
- Party: Citizens
- Other political affiliations: Palmer United (2013–2016) Liberal (before 2013, 2016–unknown)
- Spouse: Josephine Deng (m. 2004)
- Education: Southeast University; University of Melbourne
- Occupation: Chief executive officer civil engineer
- Profession: Businessman politician

Zhenya Wang (Chinese: 王振亚; pinyin: Wáng Zhènyà; born 20 January 1981), also known as Dio Wang, is a Chinese-born Australian former senator and civil engineer. He was the CEO of Australasian Resources from July 2010 until 20 June 2014, when he resigned in preparation for his role as Senator for Western Australia (WA). He did not retain his seat at the 2016 double dissolution election recording 0.38% of the WA primary senate vote.

== Early life ==
Wang was born in Nanjing, China, where he studied civil engineering at Southeast University.

Wang migrated to Australia in 2003, and has been an Australian citizen since 2009. He studied at the University of Melbourne, where he earned a Postgraduate Diploma in Planning and Design (Urban Planning) and Master of Engineering Structures.

== Australasian Resources (2006–2013) ==
Wang was employed from 2006 by Australasian Resources, in which Clive Palmer owned a 70% share. He was initially employed as a civil engineer for the company and went on to become a chief executive officer and the managing director, nationally.

Palmer provided cash injections to save Australasian Resources from insolvency, during Wang's directorship. Wang resigned as managing director of Australasian Resources before he assumed his Senate seat.

== Political career (2013–2016) ==
Wang was the lead Senate candidate for the Palmer United Party (PUP), in Western Australia at the 2013 federal election. Wang was announced as having been elected to the Senate, but lost on a recount. The PUP disputed the result of the recount, citing the loss of over 1,300 ballot papers between the original count and the recount.

=== Senator for Western Australia (2014—2016) ===
The High Court ordered a fresh 2014 half-Senate election for WA, declaring open the six seats in question. At the new election, Wang won the fifth vacancy with a 12.3 percent vote, an increase of 7.3 percent. He joined the Senate on 1 July 2014.

The PUP won three Senate seats at the 2013 election, including Wang's success at the WA special Senate election. However, within eighteen months, Wang's two Senate colleagues, deputy Senate leader Jacqui Lambie and Senate leader Glenn Lazarus, had resigned from the party to sit as independents, leaving Wang as the only PUP Senator, and one of only two PUP members of the Federal Parliament, the other being party leader Clive Palmer in the House of Representatives. Wang served as the whip of the PUP and then leader before his Senate term was cut short at the 2016 double dissolution election.

Wang courted controversy in 2015 when, shortly after the 26th anniversary of 1989 Tiananmen Square protests, he defended the protest's violent suppression by the government of the People's Republic of China. A few days later Wang spoke again to defend China over territorial claims in the South China Sea.

The PUP ceased to have any political representation in Australia after the 2016 federal election, and Clive Palmer resigned his leadership of the party. Following his electoral defeat, Wang joined the Liberal Party, and there was some speculation that he would seek pre-selection for that party.
