= Members of the Australian Senate, 2022–2025 =

- ←2019–2022 2025–2028→
- Composition (30 June 2025) Government (26); Labor (26) Opposition (30); Coalition; Liberal (25) (Note: Included two Liberal National Party of Queensland (LNP) and one Country Liberal Party (CLP) senator who sat in the National party room.); National (5) (Note: Included two Liberal National Party of Queensland (LNP) senators who sit in the National party room.) Crossbench (20); Greens (10); Independent (4) (Note: David Pocock (ACT), Lidia Thorpe (Vic), Tammy Tyrell (Tas), David Van (Vic)); One Nation (2); Lambie Network (1); United Australia Party (1); Australia's Voice (1); People First (1)

This is a list of members of the Australian Senate following the 2022 Australian federal election held on 21 May 2022. Terms for newly elected senators representing the Australian states begin on 1 July 2022. Terms for senators in the Australian Capital Territory and Northern Territory began on the day of the election, 21 May 2022.

== Leadership ==
=== Presiding officers ===
Office	Party	Officer	State	Since
President of the Senate	Labor	Sue Lines	WA	26 July 2022
Deputy President and Chair of Committees	Liberal	Andrew McLachlan	SA	26 July 2022

=== Government leadership ===
- Leader of the Government: Penny Wong
- Deputy Leader of the Government: Don Farrell
- Chief Government Whip: Anne Urquhart
- Deputy Government Whips: Raff Ciccone & Louise Pratt
- Manager of Government Business: Katy Gallagher

=== Opposition leadership ===
- Leader of the Opposition: Simon Birmingham (until January 2025), Michaelia Cash (from January 2025)
- Deputy Leader of the Opposition: Michaelia Cash (until January 2025), Anne Ruston (from January 2025)
- Chief Opposition Whip: Wendy Askew
- Deputy Opposition Whips: Paul Scarr & Matt O'Sullivan
- Manager of Opposition Business: Anne Ruston (until January 2025), Jonathon Duniam (since January 2025)

== List of senators ==
Senator		Party	State/Territory	End term	Years in office	Ref
Sen. Allman-Payne	Penny Allman-Payne (born 1970)	Greens	Queensland	2028	2022–present	
Sen. Antic	Alex Antic (born 1974)	Liberal	South Australia	2025	2019–present	
Liberal Party image placeholder	Wendy Askew (born 1963)	Liberal	Tasmania	2028	2019–present	
Sen. Ayres	Tim Ayres (born 1973)	Labor	New South Wales	2025	2019–present	
Sen. Babet	Ralph Babet (born 1983)	United Australia	Victoria	2028	2022–present	
Sen. Bilyk	Catryna Bilyk (born 1959)	Labor	Tasmania	2025	2008–2025	
Sen. Birmingham	Simon Birmingham (Note: Simon Birmingham resigned on 28 January 2025. Leah Blyth was appointed to fill the vacancy on 6 February 2025.) (born 1974)	Liberal	South Australia	2028	2007–2025	
Liberal Party image placeholder	Leah Blyth	Liberal	South Australia	2028	2025–present	
Sen. Bragg	Andrew Bragg (born 1984)	Liberal	New South Wales	2025	2019–present	
Sen. Brockman	Slade Brockman (born 1970)	Liberal	Western Australia	2025	2017–present	
Sen. Brown	Carol Brown (born 1963)	Labor	Tasmania	2025	2005–present	
National Party image placeholder	Ross Cadell (born 1969)	National	New South Wales	2028	2022–present	
Sen. Canavan	Matt Canavan (born 1980)	Liberal National (Note: Member of the LNP who sits with the National Party.)	Queensland	2028	2014–present	
Sen. Cash	Michaelia Cash (born 1970)	Liberal	Western Australia	2028	2008–present	
Sen. Chandler	Claire Chandler (born 1990)	Liberal	Tasmania	2025	2019–present	
Sen. Chisholm	Anthony Chisholm (born 1978)	Labor	Queensland	2028	2016–present	
Sen. Raff	Raff Ciccone (born 1983)	Labor	Victoria	2025	2019–present	
Sen. Colbeck	Richard Colbeck (born 1958)	Liberal	Tasmania	2025	2002–2016, 2018–present	
Sen. Cox	Dorinda Cox (born 1976)	Greens / Labor (Note: Dorinda Cox was a member of the Greens until she resigned from the party on 2 June 2025 and joined the Labor Party.)	Western Australia	2028	2021–present	
Labor Party image placeholder	Lisa Darmanin (Note: Linda White died on 29 February 2024. Lisa Darmanin was appointed to fill the vacancy on 29 May 2024.)	Labor	Victoria	2028	2024–present	
National Party image placeholder	Perin Davey (born 1972)	National	New South Wales	2025	2019–2025	
Sen. Dodson	Pat Dodson (Note: Pat Dodson resigned on 26 January 2024. Varun Ghosh was appointed to fill the vacancy on 1 February 2024.) (born 1948)	Labor	Western Australia	2025	2016–2024	
Labor Party image placeholder	Josh Dolega (Note: Anne Urquhart resigned on 28 March 2025. Josh Dolega was appointed to fill the vacancy on 27 May 2025.) (born ?)	Labor	Tasmania	2028	2025–present	
Sen. Duniam	Jonathon Duniam (born 1982)	Liberal	Tasmania	2028	2016–present	
Sen. Farrell	Don Farrell (born 1954)	Labor	South Australia	2028	2008–2014, 2016–present	
Sen. Faruqi	Mehreen Faruqi (born 1963)	Greens	New South Wales	2025	2018–present	
Sen. Fawcett	David Fawcett (born 1963)	Liberal	South Australia	2025	2011–2025	
Sen. Gallagher	Katy Gallagher (born 1970)	Labor	Australian Capital Territory	2025	2015–2018, 2019–present	
Labor Party image placeholder	Varun Ghosh (born 1985)	Labor	Western Australia	2025	2024–present	
Labor Party image placeholder	Nita Green (born 1983)	Labor	Queensland	2025	2019–present	
Sen. Grogan	Karen Grogan (born 1967)	Labor	South Australia	2025	2021–present	
Sen. Hanson	Pauline Hanson (born 1954)	One Nation	Queensland	2028	2016–present	
Sen. Hanson-Young	Sarah Hanson-Young (born 1981)	Greens	South Australia	2025	2008–present	
Sen. Henderson	Sarah Henderson (born 1964)	Liberal	Victoria	2028	2019–present	
Sen. Hodgins-May	Steph Hodgins-May (Note: Janet Rice resigned on 19 April 2024. Steph Hodgins-May was appointed to fill the vacancy on 1 May 2024.) (born 1985)	Greens	Victoria	2025	2024–present	
Liberal Party image placeholder	Hollie Hughes (born 1975)	Liberal	New South Wales	2025	2019–2025	
Sen. Hume	Jane Hume (born 1971)	Liberal	Victoria	2025	2016–present	
Sen. Kovacic	Maria Kovacic (Note: Jim Molan died on 16 January 2023. Maria Kovacic was appointed to fill the vacancy on 31 May 2023.) (born 1970)	Liberal	New South Wales	2028	2023–present	
Sen. Lambie	Jacqui Lambie (born 1971)	Lambie	Tasmania	2025	2014–2017, 2019–present	
Sen. Liddle	Kerrynne Liddle (born 1967)	Liberal	South Australia	2028	2022–present	
Sen. Lines	Sue Lines (born 1953)	Labor	Western Australia	2028	2013–present	
Sen. McAllister	Jenny McAllister (born 1973)	Labor	New South Wales	2028	2015–present	
Sen. McCarthy	Malarndirri McCarthy (born 1970)	Labor	Northern Territory	2025	2016–present	
Liberal National Party image placeholder	Susan McDonald (born 1970)	Liberal National	Queensland	2025	2019–present	
Sen. McGrath	James McGrath (born 1974)	Liberal National (Note: Member of the LNP who sits with the Liberal Party.)	Queensland	2028	2014–present	
Sen. McKenzie	Bridget McKenzie (born 1969)	National	Victoria	2028	2011–present	
Sen. McKim	Nick McKim (born 1965)	Greens	Tasmania	2025	2015–present	
Sen. McLachlan	Andrew McLachlan (born 1966)	Liberal	South Australia	2028	2020–present	
Liberal Party image placeholder	Jim Molan (1950–2023)	Liberal	New South Wales	2028	2017–2019, 2019–2023	
Sen. O'Neill	Deborah O'Neill (born 1961)	Labor	New South Wales	2028	2013–present	
Sen. O'Sullivan	Matt O'Sullivan (born 1978)	Liberal	Western Australia	2025	2019–present	
Sen. Paterson	James Paterson (born 1987)	Liberal	Victoria	2025	2016–present	
Sen. Payman	Fatima Payman (born 1995)	Labor / Independent (Note: Fatima Payman was a member of Labor until she resigned from the party on 4 July 2024 to sit as an independent. Payman created a new party, Australia's Voice, on 9 October 2024.) / Australia's Voice	Western Australia	2028	2022–present	
Sen. Payne	Marise Payne (Note: Marise Payne resigned on 30 September 2023. Former MP Dave Sharma was appointed to fill the vacancy on 30 November 2023.) (born 1964)	Liberal	New South Wales	2028	1997–2023	
Sen. Barbara Pocock	Barbara Pocock (born 1955)	Greens	South Australia	2028	2022–present	
Sen. David Pocock	David Pocock (born 1988)	Independent	Australian Capital Territory	2025	2022–present	
Sen. Polley	Helen Polley (born 1957)	Labor	Tasmania	2028	2005–present	
Sen. Pratt	Louise Pratt (born 1972)	Labor	Western Australia	2025	2008–2014, 2016–2025	
Sen. Price	Jacinta Nampijinpa Price (born 1981)	Country Liberal (Note: Jacinta Nampijinpa Price is a member of the CLP who sat with the National Party until 8 May 2025 when she switched to the Liberal Party.)	Northern Territory	2025	2022–present	
Sen. Rennick	Gerard Rennick (born 1970)	Liberal National / Independent (Note: Gerard Rennick was a member of the Liberal Party until he resigned from the party on 25 August 2024 to sit as an independent. Rennick created a new party, the People First Party, on 10 September 2024.) / People First	Queensland	2025	2019–2025	
Sen. Reynolds	Linda Reynolds CSC (born 1965)	Liberal	Western Australia	2025	2014–2025	
Sen. Rice	Janet Rice (born 1960)	Greens	Victoria	2025	2014–2024	
Sen. Roberts	Malcolm Roberts (born 1955)	One Nation	Queensland	2025	2016–2017, 2019–present	
Sen. Ruston	Anne Ruston (born 1963)	Liberal	South Australia	2025	2012–present	
Liberal National Party image placeholder	Paul Scarr (born 1969)	Liberal National	Queensland	2025	2019–present	
Sen. Sharma	Dave Sharma (born 1975)	Liberal	New South Wales	2028	2023–present	
Sen. Sheldon	Tony Sheldon (born 1961)	Labor	New South Wales	2025	2019–present	
Sen. Shoebridge	David Shoebridge (born 1971)	Greens	New South Wales	2028	2022–present	
Sen. Smith	Dean Smith (born 1969)	Liberal	Western Australia	2028	2012–present	
Labor Party image placeholder	Marielle Smith (born 1986)	Labor	South Australia	2025	2019–present	
Sen. Steele-John	Jordon Steele-John (born 1994)	Greens	Western Australia	2025	2017–present	
Sen. Sterle	Glenn Sterle (born 1960)	Labor	Western Australia	2028	2005–present	
Sen. Stewart	Jana Stewart (born 1987)	Labor	Victoria	2028	2022–present	
Sen. Thorpe	Lidia Thorpe (born 1973)	Greens / Independent (Note: Lidia Thorpe was a member of the Greens until she resigned from the party on 6 February 2023 to sit as an independent.)	Victoria	2028	2020–present	
Sen. Tyrrell	Tammy Tyrrell (born 1970)	Lambie / Independent (Note: Tammy Tyrrell was a member of the Jacqui Lambie Network until she resigned from the party on 28 March 2024 to sit as an independent.)	Tasmania	2028	2022–present	
Labor Party image placeholder	Anne Urquhart (born 1957)	Labor	Tasmania	2028	2011–2025	
Sen. Van	David Van (born 1964)	Liberal / Independent (Note: David Van was expelled from the Liberal Party party room on 15 June 2023 before resigning from the party on 19 June 2023 to sit as an independent.)	Victoria	2025	2019–2025	
Sen. Walsh	Jess Walsh (born 1971)	Labor	Victoria	2025	2019–present	
Sen. Waters	Larissa Waters (born 1977)	Greens	Queensland	2025	2011–2017, 2018–present	
Sen. Watt	Murray Watt (born 1973)	Labor	Queensland	2028	2016–present	
Sen. Whish-Wilson	Peter Whish-Wilson (born 1968)	Greens	Tasmania	2028	2012–present	
Labor Party image placeholder	Linda White (1960–2024)	Labor	Victoria	2028	2022–2024	
Sen. Wong	Penny Wong (born 1968)	Labor	South Australia	2028	2002–present	

== Changes of composition ==
=== Party composition ===
Over the course of the 47th Parliament, changes in membership resulted in changes to party composition, which are summarised below.

Affiliation	Party (shading shows control)													Total	Vacant
Affiliation	GRN	ALP	IND	CA	REX	JLN	LPA	NPA	LDP	ON	UAP	PFP	AV	Total	Vacant
End of previous Parliament	9	26	—	1	1	1	31	4	1	2	—	—	—	76	0
Begin (26 July 2022)	12	26	1	—		2	26	6	—	2	1	—	—	76	0
16 January 2023	12	26	1	—		2	25	6	—	2	1	—	—	75	1
6 February 2023	11	26	2	—		2	25	6	—	2	1	—	—	75	1
31 May 2023	11	26	2	—		2	26	6	—	2	1	—	—	76	0
19 June 2023	11	26	3	—		2	25	6	—	2	1	—	—	76	0
30 September 2023	11	26	3	—		2	24	6	—	2	1	—	—	75	1
30 November 2023	11	26	3	—		2	25	6	—	2	1	—	—	76	0
26 January 2024	11	25	3	—		2	25	6	—	2	1	—	—	75	1
1 February 2024	11	26	3	—		2	25	6	—	2	1	—	—	76	0
29 February 2024	11	25	3	—		2	25	6	—	2	1	—	—	75	1
28 March 2024	11	25	4	—		1	25	6	—	2	1	—	—	75	1
19 April 2024	10	25	4	—		1	25	6	—	2	1	—	—	74	2
1 May 2024	11	25	4	—		1	25	6	—	2	1	—	—	75	1
29 May 2024	11	26	4	—		1	25	6	—	2	1	—	—	76	0
4 July 2024	11	25	5	—		1	25	6	—	2	1	—	—	76	0
25 August 2024	11	25	6	—		1	24	6	—	2	1	—	—	76	0
10 September 2024	11	25	5	—		1	24	6	—	2	1	1	—	76	0
9 October 2024	11	25	4	—		1	24	6	—	2	1	1	1	76	0
28 January 2025	11	25	4	—		1	23	6	—	2	1	1	1	75	1
6 February 2025	11	25	4	—		1	24	6	—	2	1	1	1	76	0
Latest voting share %	14.47	32.89	5.26	—		1.32	39.47		—	2.63	1.32	1.32	1.32		
After prorogation
28 March 2025	11	24	4	—		1	24	6	—	2	1	1	1	75	1
8 May 2025	11	24	4	—		1	25	5	—	2	1	1	1	75	1
27 May 2025	11	25	4	—		1	25	5	—	2	1	1	1	76	0
2 June 2025	10	26	4	—		1	25	5	—	2	1	1	1	76	0

=== Membership changes ===
This table lists senators who have resigned, died, been elected or appointed, or otherwise changed their party affiliation during the 47th Parliament.

Seat	Before		Change		After		
Seat	Member	Party	Type	Date	Date	Member	Party
New South Wales	Jim Molan	Liberal	Death	16 January 2023	31 May 2023	Maria Kovacic	Liberal
Victoria	Lidia Thorpe	Greens	Resignation from party	6 February 2023		Lidia Thorpe	Independent
Victoria	David Van	Liberal	Expulsion from party room	15 June 2023		David Van	Independent
New South Wales	Marise Payne	Liberal	Resignation	30 September 2023	30 November 2023	Dave Sharma	Liberal
Western Australia	Pat Dodson	Labor	Resignation	26 January 2024	1 February 2024	Varun Ghosh	Labor
Victoria	Linda White	Labor	Death	29 February 2024	29 May 2024	Lisa Darmanin	Labor
Tasmania	Tammy Tyrrell	Lambie	Resignation from party	28 March 2024		Tammy Tyrrell	Independent
Victoria	Janet Rice	Greens	Resignation	19 April 2024	1 May 2024	Steph Hodgins-May	Greens
Western Australia	Fatima Payman	Labor	Resignation from party	4 July 2024		Fatima Payman	Independent
Queensland	Gerard Rennick	LNP	Resignation from party	25 August 2024		Gerard Rennick	Independent
Queensland	Gerard Rennick	Independent	Joined new party	10 September 2024		Gerard Rennick	People First
South Australia	Simon Birmingham	Liberal	Resignation	28 January 2025	6 February 2025	Leah Blyth	Liberal
After prorogation
Tasmania	Anne Urquhart	Labor	Resignation	28 March 2025	27 May 2025	Josh Dolega	Labor
Northern Territory	Jacinta Nampijinpa Price	National	Switching party-room	9 May 2025		Jacinta Nampijinpa Price	Liberal
Western Australia	Dorinda Cox	Greens	Resignation from party	2 June 2025		Dorinda Cox	Labor
