= Members of the Australian Senate, 2025–2028 =

- ←2022–2025 2028–2031→
- Composition (Current) Government (30): Labor (30); Opposition (27); Coalition: Liberal (23) (Note: Including two Liberal National Party of Queensland (LNP) senators and one Country Liberal Party senator who sit in the Liberal party room.); National (4) (Note: Including two Liberal National Party of Queensland (LNP) senators who sit in the National party room.); Crossbench (19): Greens (10); One Nation (4); Lambie Network (1); United Australia (1); Australia's Voice (1); Independent (2) (Note: David Pocock (ACT); Lidia Thorpe (Vic))

This is a list of members of the Australian Senate following the 2025 Australian federal election held on 3 May 2025. Terms for newly elected senators representing the Australian states begin on 1 July 2025. Terms for senators in the Australian Capital Territory and Northern Territory began on the day of the election, 3 May 2025. (Note: The terms of senators from the Australian Capital Territory and the Northern Territory end on the next dissolution of the House of Representatives.) (Note: The changes to the composition of the Senate, in chronological order, were: Stacey resigned; (Note: Warwick Stacey resigned on 19 August 2025. Sean Bell was appointed to fill the vacancy on 18 September 2025.) Bell was appointed as Stacey's replacement; Askew resigned; (Note: Wendy Askew resigned on 10 August 2026. Chris Gatenby was appointed to fill the vacancy on 13 August 2026.) Gatenby was appointed as Askew's replacement; Whish-Wilson resigned; (Note: Peter Whish-Wilson resigned on 14 August 2026. Vanessa Bleyer was appointed to fill the vacancy on 20 August 2026.) Bleyer was appointed as Whish-Wilson's replacement.)

== Leadership ==
=== Presiding officers ===
Office	Party	Officer	State	Since
President of the Senate	Labor	Sue Lines	WA	26 July 2022
Deputy President and Chair of Committees	Liberal	Slade Brockman	WA	22 July 2025

=== Government leadership ===
- Leader of the Government: Penny Wong
- Deputy Leader of the Government: Don Farrell
- Manager of Government Business: Katy Gallagher

=== Opposition leadership ===
- Leader of the Opposition: Michaelia Cash
- Deputy Leader of the Opposition: Anne Ruston
- Manager of Opposition Business: Jonathon Duniam

== List of senators ==
Senator		Party	State/Territory	End term	Years in office	Ref
Sen. Allman-Payne	Penny Allman-Payne (born 1970)	Greens	Queensland	2028	2022–present	
Labor Party image placeholder	Michelle Ananda-Rajah (born 1972)	Labor	Victoria	2031	2025–present	
Sen. Antic	Alex Antic (born 1974)	Liberal	South Australia	2031	2019–present	
Liberal Party image placeholder	Wendy Askew (born 1963)	Liberal	Tasmania	2028	2019–2026	
Sen. Ayres	Tim Ayres (born 1973)	Labor	New South Wales	2031	2019–present	
Sen. Babet	Ralph Babet (born 1983)	United Australia	Victoria	2028	2022–present	
Pauline Hanson's One Nation image placeholder	Sean Bell (born 1987)	One Nation	New South Wales	2031	2025–present	
Sen. Bleyer	Vanessa Bleyer (born 1975 or 1976)	Greens	Tasmania	2028	2026–present	
Liberal Party image placeholder	Leah Blyth	Liberal	South Australia	2028	2025–present	
Sen. Bragg	Andrew Bragg (born 1984)	Liberal	New South Wales	2031	2019–present	
Sen. Brockman	Slade Brockman (born 1970)	Liberal	Western Australia	2031	2017–present	
Sen. Brown	Carol Brown (born 1963)	Labor	Tasmania	2031	2005–present	
National Party image placeholder	Ross Cadell (born 1969)	National	New South Wales	2028	2022–present	
Sen. Canavan	Matt Canavan (born 1980)	National (Note: Member of the LNP who sits with the National Party.)	Queensland	2028	2014–present	
Sen. Cash	Michaelia Cash (born 1970)	Liberal	Western Australia	2028	2008–present	
Sen. Chandler	Claire Chandler (born 1990)	Liberal	Tasmania	2031	2019–present	
Sen. Chisholm	Anthony Chisholm (born 1978)	Labor	Queensland	2028	2016–present	
Sen. Raff	Raff Ciccone (born 1983)	Labor	Victoria	2031	2019–present	
Sen. Colbeck	Richard Colbeck (born 1958)	Liberal	Tasmania	2031	2002–2016, 2018–present	
Liberal Party image placeholder	Jessica Collins (born 1983)	Liberal	New South Wales	2031	2025–present	
Sen. Cox	Dorinda Cox (born 1976)	Labor	Western Australia	2028	2021–present	
Labor Party image placeholder	Lisa Darmanin	Labor	Victoria	2028	2024–present	
Labor Party image placeholder	Josh Dolega (born 1983)	Labor	Tasmania	2028	2025–present	
Labor Party image placeholder	Richard Dowling (born 1983)	Labor	Tasmania	2031	2025–present	
Sen. Duniam	Jonathon Duniam (born 1982)	Liberal	Tasmania	2028	2016–present	
Sen. Farrell	Don Farrell (born 1954)	Labor	South Australia	2028	2008–2014, 2016–present	
Sen. Faruqi	Mehreen Faruqi (born 1963)	Greens	New South Wales	2031	2018–present	
Sen. Gallagher	Katy Gallagher (born 1970)	Labor	Australian Capital Territory	2028	2015–2018, 2019–present	
Liberal Party image placeholder	Chris Gatenby	Liberal	Tasmania	2028	2026–present	
Labor Party image placeholder	Varun Ghosh (born 1985)	Labor	Western Australia	2031	2024–present	
Labor Party image placeholder	Nita Green (born 1983)	Labor	Queensland	2031	2019–present	
Sen. Grogan	Karen Grogan (born 1967)	Labor	South Australia	2031	2021–present	
Sen. Hanson	Pauline Hanson (born 1954)	One Nation	Queensland	2028	2016–present	
Sen. Hanson-Young	Sarah Hanson-Young (born 1981)	Greens	South Australia	2031	2008–present	
Sen. Henderson	Sarah Henderson (born 1964)	Liberal	Victoria	2028	2019–present	
Sen. Hodgins-May	Steph Hodgins-May (born 1985)	Greens	Victoria	2031	2024–present	
Sen. Hume	Jane Hume (born 1971)	Liberal	Victoria	2031	2016–present	
Sen. Kovacic	Maria Kovacic (born 1970)	Liberal	New South Wales	2028	2023–present	
Sen. Lambie	Jacqui Lambie (born 1971)	Lambie	Tasmania	2031	2014–2017, 2019–present	
Sen. Liddle	Kerrynne Liddle (born 1967)	Liberal	South Australia	2028	2022–present	
Sen. Lines	Sue Lines (born 1953)	Labor	Western Australia	2028	2013–present	
Sen. McAllister	Jenny McAllister (born 1973)	Labor	New South Wales	2028	2015–present	
Sen. McCarthy	Malarndirri McCarthy (born 1970)	Labor	Northern Territory	2028	2016–present	
Liberal National Party image placeholder	Susan McDonald (born 1970)	National	Queensland	2031	2019–present	
Sen. McGrath	James McGrath (born 1974)	Liberal (Note: Member of the LNP who sits with the Liberal Party.)	Queensland	2028	2014–present	
Sen. McKenzie	Bridget McKenzie (born 1969)	National	Victoria	2028	2011–present	
Sen. McKim	Nick McKim (born 1965)	Greens	Tasmania	2031	2015–present	
Sen. McLachlan	Andrew McLachlan (born 1966)	Liberal	South Australia	2028	2020–present	
Labor Party image placeholder	Corinne Mulholland (born 1987)	Labor	Queensland	2031	2025–present	
Sen. O'Neill	Deborah O'Neill (born 1961)	Labor	New South Wales	2028	2013–present	
Sen. O'Sullivan	Matt O'Sullivan (born 1978)	Liberal	Western Australia	2031	2019–present	
Sen. Paterson	James Paterson (born 1987)	Liberal	Victoria	2031	2016–present	
Sen. Payman	Fatima Payman (born 1995)	Australia's Voice	Western Australia	2028	2022–present	
Sen. Barbara Pocock	Barbara Pocock (born 1955)	Greens	South Australia	2028	2022–present	
Sen. David Pocock	David Pocock (born 1988)	Independent	Australian Capital Territory	2028	2022–present	
Sen. Polley	Helen Polley (born 1957)	Labor	Tasmania	2028	2005–present	
Sen. Price	Jacinta Nampijinpa Price (born 1981)	Liberal (Note: Member of the CLP who sits with the Liberal Party.)	Northern Territory	2028	2022–present	
Sen. Roberts	Malcolm Roberts (born 1955)	One Nation	Queensland	2031	2016–2017, 2019–present	
Sen. Ruston	Anne Ruston (born 1963)	Liberal	South Australia	2031	2012–present	
Liberal National Party image placeholder	Paul Scarr (born 1969)	Liberal	Queensland	2031	2019–present	
Sen. Sharma	Dave Sharma (born 1975)	Liberal	New South Wales	2028	2023–present	
Sen. Sheldon	Tony Sheldon (born 1961)	Labor	New South Wales	2031	2019–present	
Sen. Shoebridge	David Shoebridge (born 1971)	Greens	New South Wales	2028	2022–present	
Sen. Smith	Dean Smith (born 1969)	Liberal	Western Australia	2028	2012–present	
Labor Party image placeholder	Marielle Smith (born 1986)	Labor	South Australia	2031	2019–present	
Pauline Hanson's One Nation image placeholder	Warwick Stacey (born 1952)	One Nation	New South Wales	2031	2025–2025	
Sen. Steele-John	Jordon Steele-John (born 1994)	Greens	Western Australia	2031	2017–present	
Sen. Sterle	Glenn Sterle (born 1960)	Labor	Western Australia	2028	2005–present	
Sen. Stewart	Jana Stewart (born 1987)	Labor	Victoria	2028	2022–present	
Sen. Thorpe	Lidia Thorpe (born 1973)	Independent	Victoria	2028	2020–present	
Sen. Tyrrell	Tammy Tyrrell (born 1970)	Labor (Note: Tyrrell sat as an independent until 14 May 2026, when she joined the Labor Party.)	Tasmania	2028	2022–present	
Sen. Walker	Charlotte Walker (born 2004)	Labor	South Australia	2031	2025–present	
Sen. Walsh	Jess Walsh (born 1971)	Labor	Victoria	2031	2019–present	
Sen. Waters	Larissa Waters (born 1977)	Greens	Queensland	2031	2011–2017, 2018–present	
Sen. Watt	Murray Watt (born 1973)	Labor	Queensland	2028	2016–present	
Sen. Whish-Wilson	Peter Whish-Wilson (born 1968)	Greens	Tasmania	2028	2012–2026	
Sen. Whiteaker	Ellie Whiteaker	Labor	Western Australia	2031	2025–present	
Pauline Hanson's One Nation image placeholder	Tyron Whitten (born 1971)	One Nation	Western Australia	2031	2025–present	
Sen. Wong	Penny Wong (born 1968)	Labor	South Australia	2028	2002–present	

== Changes of composition ==
=== Party composition ===
Over the course of the 48th Parliament, changes in membership resulted in changes to party composition, which are summarised below.

Affiliation	Party (shading shows control)										Total	Vacant
Affiliation	GRN	ALP	IND	JLN	LPA	NPA	ON	UAP	PFP	AV	Total	Vacant
End of previous Parliament	10	26	4	1	25	5	2	1	1	1	76	0
Begin (22 July 2025)	10	29	3	1	23	4	4	1	—	1	76	0
19 August 2025	10	29	3	1	23	4	3	1	—	1	75	1
18 September 2025	10	29	3	1	23	4	4	1	—	1	76	0
14 May 2026	10	30	2	1	23	4	4	1	—	1	76	0
Latest voting share %	13.16	39.47	2.63	1.32	35.53		5.26	1.32	—	1.32		

=== Membership changes ===
This table lists senators who have resigned, died, been elected or appointed, or otherwise changed their party affiliation during the 48th Parliament.

Seat	Before		Change		After		
Seat	Member	Party	Type	Date	Date	Member	Party
New South Wales	Warwick Stacey	One Nation	Resignation	19 August 2025	18 September 2025	Sean Bell	One Nation
Tasmania	Tammy Tyrrell	Tyrrell for Tasmania	Joined new party	14 May 2026		Tammy Tyrrell	Labor
Tasmania	Wendy Askew	Liberal	Resignation	10 August 2026	13 August 2026	Chris Gatenby	Liberal
Tasmania	Peter Whish-Wilson	Greens	Resignation	14 August 2026	20 August 2026	Vanessa Bleyer	Greens
Tasmania	Jonathan Duniam	Liberal	Resignation	Late 2026 (TBD)	Late 2026 (TBD)	Sarah Courtney (designate)	Liberal
