= Members of the Australian Senate, 2019–2022 =

- ←2016–2019 2022–2025→
- ) Composition (May 2022) Government (35); Coalition; Liberal (31) (Note: Including four Liberal National Party of Queensland (LNP) senators who sits in the Liberals party room.); National (4) (Note: Including two Liberal National Party of Queensland (LNP) senators who sits in the Nationals party room.) Opposition (26); Labor (26) Crossbench (15); Greens (9); One Nation (2); Centre Alliance (1); Lambie Network (1); Patrick Team (1); Liberal Democrats (1) Composition (July 2019) Composition of the Senate Government (35); Coalition; Liberal (30) (Note: Four Liberal National Party of Queensland (LNP) senators sat in the Liberal party room, while two senators sat in the Nationals party room.); National (5) (Note: One Country Liberal Party senator sat in the Nationals party room.) Opposition (26); Labor (26) Crossbench (15); Greens (9); Centre Alliance (2); Jacqui Lambie (1); Independent (1); One Nation (2)

Senators by State in Australia

This is a list of members of the Australian Senate following the 2019 Australian federal election held on 18 May 2019. Terms for newly elected senators representing the Australian states began on 1 July 2019. Terms for senators in the Australian Capital Territory and Northern Territory began on the day of the election, 18 May 2019.

Senator	Party	State	End term	Years in office
Eric Abetz	Liberal	Tasmania	2022	1994–2022
Alex Antic	Liberal	South Australia	2025	2019–present
Wendy Askew	Liberal	Tasmania	2022	2019–present
Tim Ayres	Labor	New South Wales	2025	2019–present
Cory Bernardi (Note: Cory Bernardi resigned from the Senate on 20 January 2020. As Bernardi was elected as a Liberal Party member in 2016, his replacement must also be from the Liberal Party. Former President of the South Australian Legislative Council Andrew McLachlan was appointed to fill the vacancy on 6 February 2020.)	Independent	South Australia	2022	2006–2020
Catryna Bilyk	Labor	Tasmania	2025	2008–2025
Simon Birmingham	Liberal	South Australia	2022	2007–2025
Andrew Bragg	Liberal	New South Wales	2025	2019–present
Slade Brockman	Liberal	Western Australia	2025	2017–present
Carol Brown	Labor	Tasmania	2025	2005–present
Matt Canavan	National (Note: Member of the LNP who sits with the National Party.)	Queensland	2022	2014–present
Kim Carr	Labor	Victoria	2022	1993–2022
Michaelia Cash	Liberal	Western Australia	2022	2008–present
Claire Chandler	Liberal	Tasmania	2025	2019–present
Anthony Chisholm	Labor	Queensland	2022	2016–present
Raff Ciccone	Labor	Victoria	2025	2019–present
Richard Colbeck	Liberal	Tasmania	2025	2002–2016, 2018–present
Mathias Cormann (Note: Mathias Cormann resigned from the Senate on 6 November 2020 to nominate for the position of Secretary-General of the OECD. Ben Small was appointed to fill the vacancy on 25 November 2020.)	Liberal	Western Australia	2022	2007–2020
Dorinda Cox (Note: Rachel Siewert resigned from the Senate on 6 September 2021. Dorinda Cox was appointed to fill the vacancy on 14 September 2021.)	Greens	Western Australia	2022	2021–present
Perin Davey	National	New South Wales	2025	2019–2025
Richard Di Natale (Note: Richard Di Natale resigned from the Senate on 26 August 2020. Former member of the Victorian Legislative Assembly Lidia Thorpe was appointed to fill the vacancy on 4 September 2020.)	Greens	Victoria	2022	2011–2020
Pat Dodson	Labor	Western Australia	2025	2016–2024
Jonathon Duniam	Liberal	Tasmania	2022	2016–present
Don Farrell	Labor	South Australia	2022	2008–2014, 2016–present
Mehreen Faruqi	Greens	New South Wales	2025	2018–present
David Fawcett	Liberal	South Australia	2025	2011–2025
Concetta Fierravanti-Wells	Liberal	New South Wales	2022	2005–2022
Mitch Fifield (Note: Mitch Fifield resigned from the Senate on 16 August 2019 to become Permanent Representative of Australia to the United Nations. Former MP Sarah Henderson was appointed to fill the vacancy on 11 September 2019.)	Liberal	Victoria	2022	2004–2019
Alex Gallacher (Note: Alex Gallacher died on 29 August 2021. Karen Grogan was appointed to fill the vacancy on 21 September 2021.)	Labor	South Australia	2025	2011–2021
Katy Gallagher	Labor	Australian Capital Territory	2022	2015–2018, 2019–present
Nita Green	Labor	Queensland	2025	2019–present
Stirling Griff	Centre Alliance	South Australia	2022	2016–2022
Karen Grogan	Labor	South Australia	2025	2021–present
Pauline Hanson	One Nation	Queensland	2022	2016–present
Sarah Hanson-Young	Greens	South Australia	2025	2008–present
Sarah Henderson	Liberal	Victoria	2022	2019–present
Hollie Hughes	Liberal	New South Wales	2025	2019–2025
Jane Hume	Liberal	Victoria	2025	2016–present
Kristina Keneally (Note: Kristina Keneally resigned on 13 April 2022 to contest the lower house seat of Fowler. A replacement was not appointed to fill the vacancy as Keneally's seat was up for election and would expire on 30 June 2022.)	Labor	New South Wales	2022	2018–2022
Kimberley Kitching (Note: Kimberley Kitching died on 10 March 2022. Jana Stewart was appointed to fill the vacancy on 6 April 2022.)	Labor	Victoria	2022	2016–2022
Jacqui Lambie	Lambie	Tasmania	2025	2014–2017, 2019–present
Sue Lines	Labor	Western Australia	2022	2013–present
Jenny McAllister	Labor	New South Wales	2022	2015–present
Malarndirri McCarthy	Labor	Northern Territory	2022	2016–present
Susan McDonald	National	Queensland	2025	2019–present
James McGrath	Liberal (Note: Member of the LNP who sits with the Liberal Party.)	Queensland	2022	2014–present
Bridget McKenzie	National	Victoria	2022	2011–present
Nick McKim	Greens	Tasmania	2025	2015–present
Andrew McLachlan	Liberal	South Australia	2022	2020–present
Sam McMahon	National / Independent / LDP (Note: Sam McMahon was a member of the Country Liberal Party who sat with the National Party, until she resigned from the CLP on 28 January 2022 to sit as an independent. On 8 April 2022 she announced that she had joined the Liberal Democratic Party.)	Northern Territory	2022	2019–2022
Greg Mirabella (Note: Scott Ryan resigned from the Senate on 13 October 2021. Greg Mirabella was appointed to fill the vacancy on 2 December 2021.)	Liberal	Victoria	2022	2021–2022
Jim Molan (Note: Arthur Sinodinos resigned from the Senate on 11 November 2019 to become Australian Ambassador to the United States. Former Liberal Senator Jim Molan was appointed to fill the vacancy on 14 November 2019.)	Liberal	New South Wales	2022	2017–2019, 2019–2023
Deborah O'Neill	Labor	New South Wales	2022	2013–present
Matt O'Sullivan	Liberal	Western Australia	2025	2019–present
James Paterson	Liberal	Victoria	2025	2016–present
Rex Patrick	Centre Alliance / Independent / Rex Patrick Team (Note: Rex Patrick resigned from Centre Alliance on 9 August 2020 and became an independent. In October 2020 he formed the Rex Patrick Team party, which was registered in January 2021.)	South Australia	2022	2017–2022
Marise Payne	Liberal	New South Wales	2022	1997–2023
Helen Polley	Labor	Tasmania	2022	2005–present
Louise Pratt	Labor	Western Australia	2025	2008–2014, 2016–2025
Gerard Rennick	Liberal	Queensland	2025	2019–2025
Linda Reynolds CSC	Liberal	Western Australia	2025	2014–2025
Janet Rice	Greens	Victoria	2025	2014–present
Malcolm Roberts	One Nation	Queensland	2025	2016–2017, 2019–present
Anne Ruston	Liberal	South Australia	2025	2012–present
Scott Ryan	Liberal	Victoria	2022	2008–2021
Paul Scarr	Liberal	Queensland	2025	2019–present
Zed Seselja	Liberal	Australian Capital Territory	2022	2013–2022
Tony Sheldon	Labor	New South Wales	2025	2019–present
Rachel Siewert	Greens	Western Australia	2022	2005–2021
Arthur Sinodinos AO	Liberal	New South Wales	2022	2011–2019
Ben Small (Note: Ben Small resigned on 15 April 2022 after discovering he was a citizen of New Zealand and ineligible to be a senator. He was nominated to replace himself on 18 May 2022.)	Liberal	Western Australia	2022	2020–2022, 2022
Dean Smith	Liberal	Western Australia	2022	2012–present
Marielle Smith	Labor	South Australia	2025	2019–present
Jordon Steele-John	Greens	Western Australia	2025	2017–present
Glenn Sterle	Labor	Western Australia	2022	2005–present
Jana Stewart	Labor	Victoria	2022	2022–present
Amanda Stoker	Liberal	Queensland	2022	2018–2022
Lidia Thorpe	Greens	Victoria	2022	2020–present
Anne Urquhart	Labor	Tasmania	2022	2011–present
David Van	Liberal	Victoria	2025	2019–2025
Jess Walsh	Labor	Victoria	2025	2019–present
Larissa Waters	Greens	Queensland	2025	2011–2017, 2018–present
Murray Watt	Labor	Queensland	2022	2016–present
Peter Whish-Wilson	Greens	Tasmania	2022	2012–present
Penny Wong	Labor	South Australia	2022	2002–present
