= List of whips in the Australian Senate =

Party position in the Australian Senate

Whips have managed business and maintained party discipline for Australia's federal political parties in the Senate since Federation. The term has origins in the British parliamentary system.

Though the Remuneration Tribunal and parliamentary website refer to the senior Labor and Liberal whips as "chief" whips and their junior whips as "deputy whips", the parties tend to refer to the senior whips as "whips" when announcing their officeholders to the Senate. A number of Senate whips have gone on to serve as ministers, and several as Leader of the Government or Leader of the Opposition in the Senate.

== Australian Labor Party ==
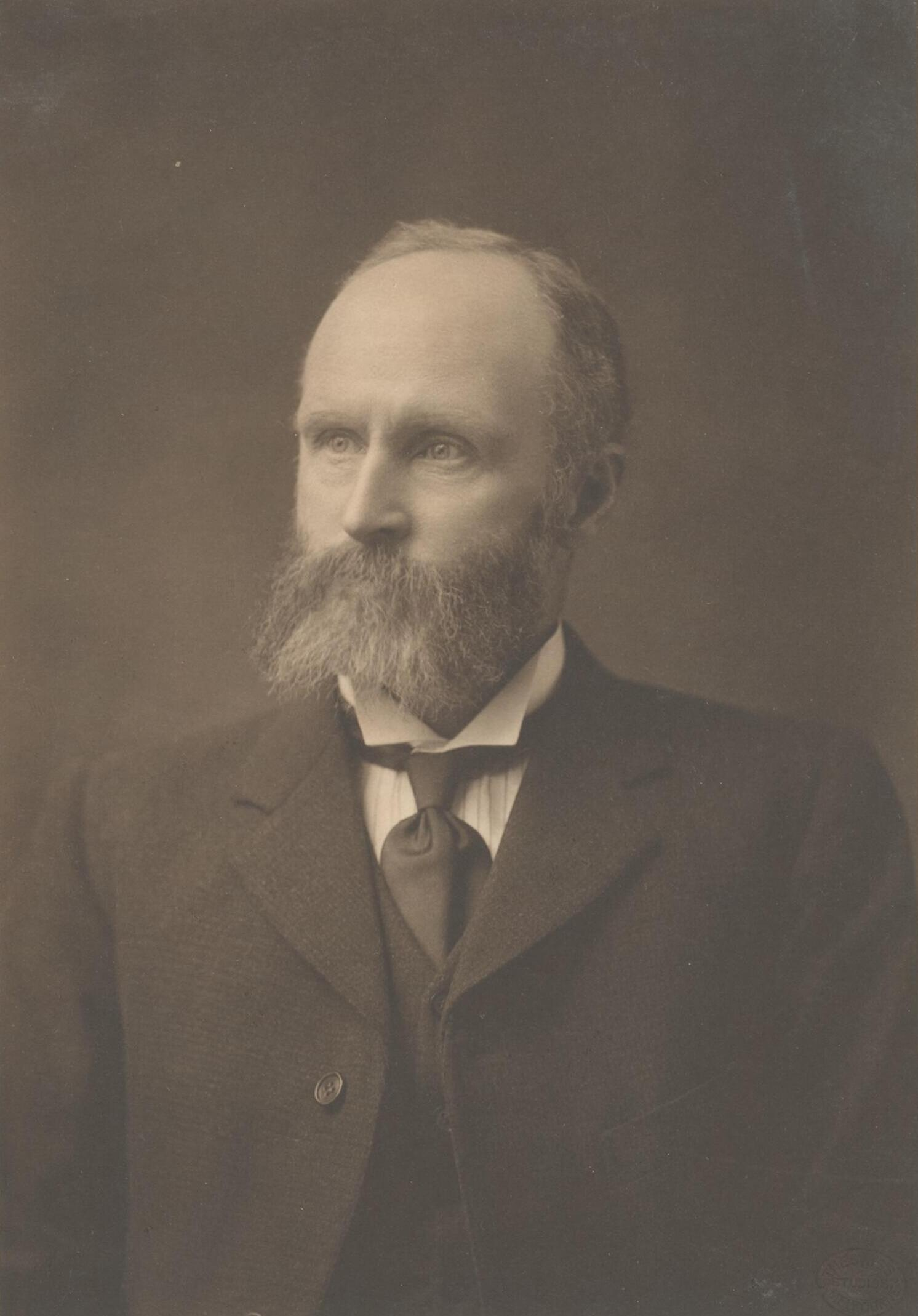
James Stewart, Labor's first Senate whip (1901–03)

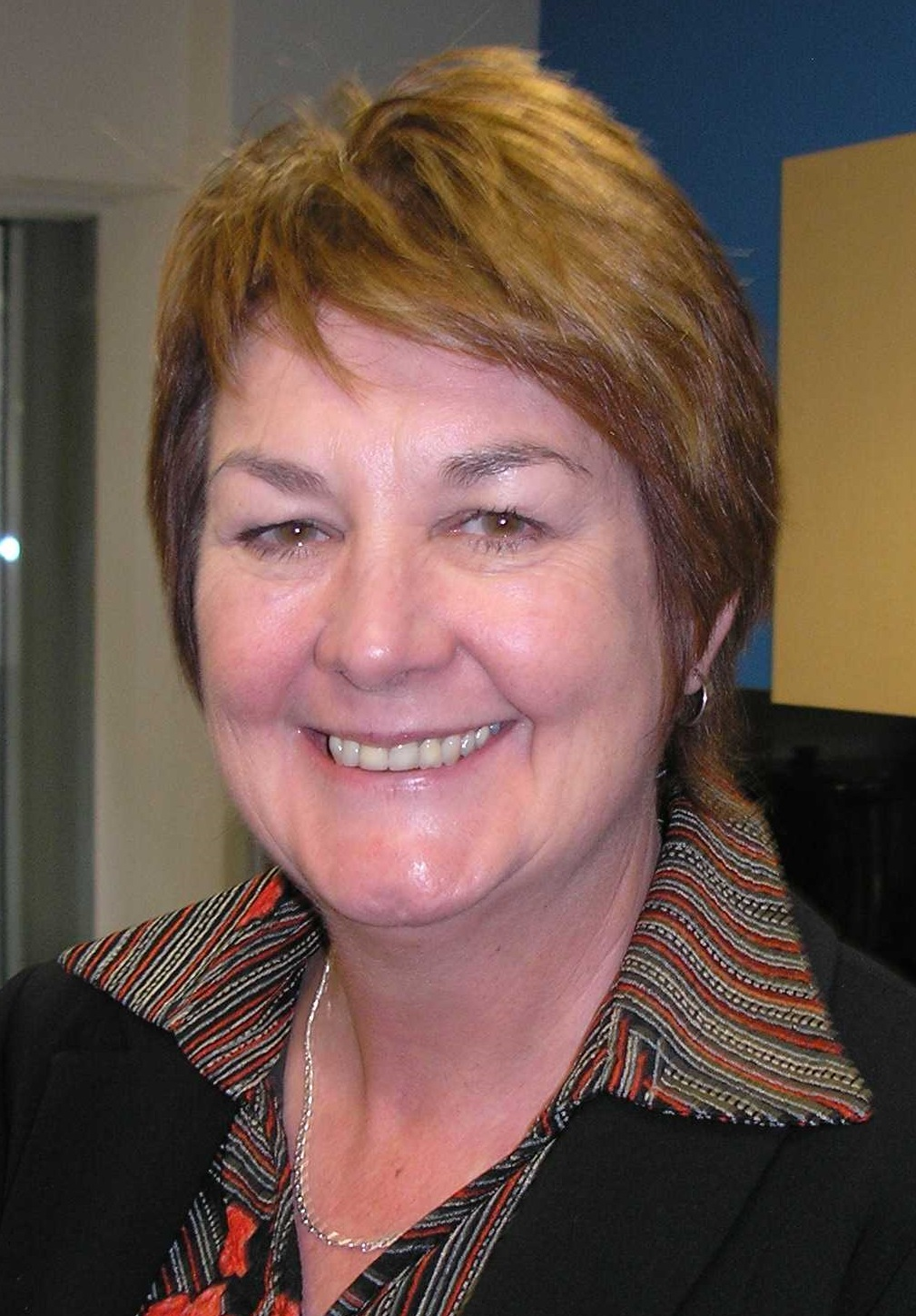
Anne McEwen, Labor whip (2010–16)

In addition to those below, Kay Denman served as a deputy whip from 18 September to 31 December 1995, a period when one of Labor's two whips was on leave of absence while conducting parliamentary business overseas.

Whip	Date	Leader
James Stewart	21 May 1901	Chris Watson
David O'Keefe	29 April 1904	Chris Watson
Hugh de Largie	20 February 1907	Chris Watson
Hugh de Largie	20 February 1907	Andrew Fisher
Rudolph Ready	18 September 1914	Andrew Fisher
Rudolph Ready	18 September 1914	Billy Hughes
Rudolph Ready	18 September 1914	Frank Tudor
Ted Needham	8 May 1917	Frank Tudor
Vacant (Note: Albert Gardiner was the only Labor senator from 1 July 1920 to December 1922.)	1 July 1920	Frank Tudor
Vacant	1 July 1920	Matthew Charlton
Ted Needham	6 July 1923	Matthew Charlton
Charles McHugh	9 July 1926	Matthew Charlton
Charles Graham	28 September 1927	Matthew Charlton
Charles Graham	28 September 1927	James Scullin
James Dunn	14 August 1929	James Scullin
Bert Hoare	18 March 1931	James Scullin
John V. MacDonald	1 July 1935 (Note: On 1 July 1935, the composition of the Senate changed such that there were three Labor senators. MacDonald was the whip, the others being leader and deputy leader of the party in the Senate. MacDonald died on 17 August 1935, and his replacement, Ben Courtice, was appointed in September. Courtice had to defend the seat at the federal election in October 1937, and he succeeded. In addition, two other Labor candidates won elections for casual Senate vacancies at that election, raising Labor's Senate caucus to five members. It is unclear if any of the five was elected whip for the 22 sitting days between November 1937 and the end of June 1938.)	James Scullin
John V. MacDonald	1 July 1935	John Curtin
Bill Ashley	20 September 1938	John Curtin
Robert Clothier	6 October 1941	John Curtin
Robert Clothier	6 October 1941	Ben Chifley
Jack Critchley	13 June 1950	Ben Chifley
Jack Critchley	13 June 1950	H. V. Evatt
Sid O'Flaherty	4 September 1957	H. V. Evatt
Sid O'Flaherty	4 September 1957	Arthur Calwell

Whip	Date	Deputy Whip	Date	Deputy Whip	Date	Leader
Justin O'Byrne (Note: Later served as President of the Australian Senate.)	20 February 1962	Bob Poke	20 February 1962			Arthur Calwell
Justin O'Byrne	20 February 1962	Bob Poke	20 February 1962			Gough Whitlam
Justin O'Byrne	20 February 1962	George Poyser	18 December 1972			Gough Whitlam
George Poyser	10 June 1974 (Note: Poyser and Devitt were the Labor whips in the 29th Parliament. The pre-sessional caucus was held on 10 June 1974.)	Don Devitt	10 June 1974			Gough Whitlam
George Georges	27 January 1976	Gordon McIntosh	27 January 1976			Gough Whitlam
George Georges	27 January 1976	Gordon McIntosh	27 January 1976			Bill Hayden
Ted Robertson	24 November 1980	Kerry Sibraa	24 November 1980			Bill Hayden
Ted Robertson	24 November 1980	Gordon McIntosh	10 March 1983			Bob Hawke
Ted Robertson	24 November 1980	Gordon McIntosh	10 March 1983	Gerry Jones	22 August 1985	Bob Hawke
Gerry Jones	14 September 1987	Graham Maguire	14 September 1987	Jim McKiernan	14 September 1987	Bob Hawke
Gerry Jones	14 September 1987	Dominic Foreman	4 November 1988	Jim McKiernan	14 September 1987	Bob Hawke
Gerry Jones	14 September 1987	Dominic Foreman	4 November 1988	John Faulkner	12 February 1991	Bob Hawke
Gerry Jones	14 September 1987	Dominic Foreman	4 November 1988	John Faulkner	12 February 1991	Paul Keating
Gerry Jones	14 September 1987	Dominic Foreman	4 November 1988	Bryant Burns	4 May 1993	Paul Keating
Chris Evans	20 March 1996	Dominic Foreman	4 November 1988	Stephen Conroy	30 April 1996	Kim Beazley
Chris Evans	20 March 1996	Kay Denman	24 September 1997	Stephen Conroy	30 April 1996	Kim Beazley
Kerry O'Brien	19 October 1998	Kay Denman	24 September 1997	John Quirke	19 October 1998	Kim Beazley
Kerry O'Brien	19 October 1998	Kay Denman	24 September 1997	Joe Ludwig	17 August 2000	Kim Beazley
Susan Mackay	22 November 2001	Trish Crossin	22 November 2001	Geoff Buckland	22 November 2001	Simon Crean
Susan Mackay	22 November 2001	Trish Crossin	22 November 2001	Geoff Buckland	22 November 2001	Mark Latham
George Campbell	22 October 2004	Ruth Webber	22 October 2004	Geoff Buckland	22 November 2001	Mark Latham
George Campbell	22 October 2004	Ruth Webber	22 October 2004	Geoff Buckland	22 November 2001	Kim Beazley
George Campbell	22 October 2004	Ruth Webber	22 October 2004	Linda Kirk	1 July 2005	Kim Beazley
George Campbell	22 October 2004	Ruth Webber	22 October 2004	Linda Kirk	1 July 2005	Kevin Rudd
Kerry O'Brien	3 December 2007	Ruth Webber	22 October 2004	Dana Wortley	3 December 2007	Kevin Rudd
Kerry O'Brien	3 December 2007	Anne McEwen	1 July 2008	Don Farrell	1 July 2008	Kevin Rudd
Kerry O'Brien	3 December 2007	Anne McEwen	1 July 2008	Don Farrell	1 July 2008	Julia Gillard
Anne McEwen	27 September 2010	Carol Brown	27 September 2010	Helen Polley	27 September 2010	Julia Gillard
Anne McEwen	27 September 2010	Carol Brown	27 September 2010	Helen Polley	27 September 2010	Kevin Rudd
Anne McEwen	27 September 2010	Catryna Bilyk	18 October 2013	Anne Urquhart	18 October 2013	Bill Shorten
Anne Urquhart	30 August 2016	Catryna Bilyk	30 August 2016	Jenny McAllister	30 August 2016	Bill Shorten
Anne Urquhart	30 August 2016	Sam Dastyari	3 February 2017	Jenny McAllister	30 August 2016	Bill Shorten
Anne Urquhart	30 August 2016	Chris Ketter	5 December 2017	Jenny McAllister	30 August 2016	Bill Shorten
Anne Urquhart	30 August 2016	Raff Ciccone	1 July 2019	Malarndirri McCarthy	2 July 2019	Anthony Albanese
Anne Urquhart	31 May 2022	Raff Ciccone	1 July 2019	Louise Pratt	31 May 2022	Anthony Albanese
Anne Urquhart	31 May 2022	Raff Ciccone	1 July 2019	Karen Grogan	18 March 2024	Anthony Albanese
Tony Sheldon	9 May 2025	Lisa Darmanin	9 May 2025	Karen Grogan	9 May 2025	Anthony Albanese

== Liberal Party of Australia ==
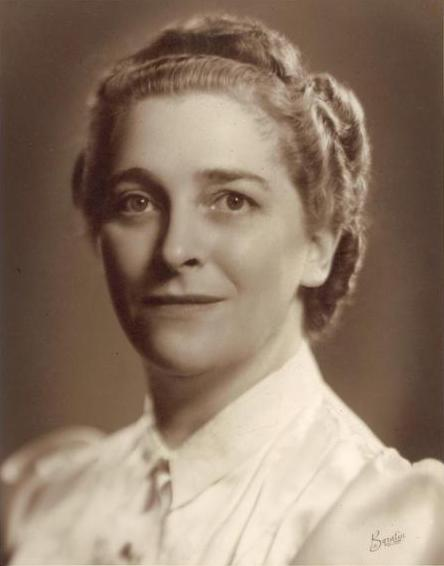
Annabelle Rankin was the Liberal's longest-serving whip and the Senate's first female whip

Whip	Date	Deputy Whip	Date	Leader
Unclear (Note: Allan MacDonald was elected the United Australia Party's Senate whip in October 1941. In parts of 1943, Oliver Uppill was acting whip due to MacDonald's illness. From July 1944, James McLachlan took over the duties associated with a whip, acting as a teller in divisions and requesting leave of absence for his party's senators. Except for periods when McLachlan was himself on leave and Burford Sampson performed those duties, McLachlan continued to act in the role of whip, suggesting he was elected to replace MacDonald in July 1944 (when senators elected at the 1943 election took their seats) and continued until June 1947, when he and all but one other Liberal were forced to vacate their seats following the party's electoral annihilation at the 1946.)	21 February 1945 (Note: Dated from the announcement in the Senate of George McLeay that "[M]embers of the party which I have the honour to lead in this chamber, wish from henceforth to be regarded as members of the Liberal party of Australia.")			Robert Menzies
Annabelle Rankin	1 July 1947			Robert Menzies
Reg Wright	21 February 1950 (Note: Wright was the whip during the 19 Parliament. In the early 1950s, Liberal Senate whips were elected, and party elections for the 19th Parliament were held on 21 February 1950.)			Robert Menzies
Annabelle Rankin	11 June 1951			Robert Menzies
Malcolm Scott	8 March 1966			Harold Holt
Bob Cotton	12 March 1968			John Gorton
Reg Withers	25 November 1969			William McMahon
Harold Young (Note: Later served as President of the Australian Senate.)	16 August 1971			William McMahon
Harold Young	16 August 1971			Billy Snedden
Harold Young	16 August 1971	Fred Chaney	20 November 1974	Billy Snedden
Fred Chaney	8 April 1975	Kathy Martin	8 April 1975	Malcolm Fraser
Fred Chaney	8 April 1975	Peter Baume	11 October 1977	Malcolm Fraser
Peter Baume	28 February 1978	John Knight	1 March 1978	Malcolm Fraser
John Knight	25 November 1980	Allan Rocher	25 November 1980	Malcolm Fraser
John Knight	25 November 1980	Bernie Kilgariff	24 February 1981	Malcolm Fraser
Bernie Kilgariff	24 March 1981	Andrew Thomas	24 March 1981	Malcolm Fraser
Bernie Kilgariff	24 March 1981	Margaret Reid	18 November 1982	Malcolm Fraser
Bernie Kilgariff	24 March 1981	Margaret Reid	18 November 1982	Andrew Peacock
Bernie Kilgariff	24 March 1981	Margaret Reid	18 November 1982	John Howard
Margaret Reid	14 September 1987	Sue Knowles	14 September 1987	John Howard
Margaret Reid	14 September 1987	Sue Knowles	14 September 1987	Andrew Peacock
Margaret Reid	14 September 1987	Sue Knowles	14 September 1987	John Hewson
Margaret Reid	14 September 1987	John Panizza	4 May 1993	John Hewson
Margaret Reid	14 September 1987	John Panizza	4 May 1993	Alexander Downer
Margaret Reid	14 September 1987	John Panizza	4 May 1993	John Howard
John Panizza	9 May 1995	Paul Calvert	9 May 1995	John Howard
Paul Calvert	11 February 1997	Bill Heffernan	11 February 1997	John Howard
Paul Calvert	11 February 1997	Helen Coonan	10 November 1998	John Howard
Paul Calvert	11 February 1997	Jeannie Ferris	23 November 2001	John Howard
Jeannie Ferris	22 August 2002	Alan Eggleston	22 August 2002	John Howard
Jeannie Ferris	22 August 2002	Stephen Parry	11 September 2006	John Howard
Stephen Parry	12 April 2007	Julian McGauran	8 May 2007	John Howard
Stephen Parry	12 April 2007	Judith Adams	3 December 2007	Brendan Nelson
Stephen Parry	12 April 2007	Judith Adams	3 December 2007	Malcolm Turnbull

Whip	Date	Deputy Whip	Date	Deputy Whip	Date	Leader
Stephen Parry	12 April 2007	Judith Adams	3 December 2007	David Bushby	4 February 2009	Malcolm Turnbull
Stephen Parry	12 April 2007	Judith Adams	3 December 2007	David Bushby	4 February 2009	Tony Abbott
Helen Kroger	4 July 2011	Judith Adams	3 December 2007	David Bushby	4 February 2009	Tony Abbott
Helen Kroger	4 July 2011	Chris Back	8 May 2012	David Bushby	4 February 2009	Tony Abbott
David Bushby	1 July 2014	Anne Ruston	1 July 2014	David Fawcett	1 July 2014	Tony Abbott
David Bushby	1 July 2014	Dean Smith	13 October 2015	David Fawcett	1 July 2014	Malcolm Turnbull
David Bushby	1 July 2014	Dean Smith	13 October 2015	Jane Hume	7 September 2018	Scott Morrison
Dean Smith	22 January 2019	Jonathon Duniam	12 February 2019	Jane Hume	22 January 2019	Scott Morrison
Wendy Askew	26 July 2022	Paul Scarr	26 July 2022	Matt O'Sullivan	26 July 2022	Peter Dutton
Wendy Askew	26 July 2022	Maria Kovacic	14 March 2024	Matt O'Sullivan	26 July 2022	Peter Dutton
Wendy Askew	26 July 2022	Leah Blyth	8 July 2025	Jessica Collins	8 July 2025	Sussan Ley
Wendy Askew	26 July 2022	Vacant	22 January 2026	Jessica Collins	8 July 2025	Sussan Ley
Wendy Askew	26 July 2022	Leah Blyth and Paul Scarr	23 February 2026	Jessica Collins	8 July 2025	Angus Taylor
Wendy Askew	26 July 2022	Leah Blyth	24 March 2026	Jessica Collins	8 July 2025	Angus Taylor
Wendy Askew	26 July 2022	Kerrynne Liddle	2 April 2026	Jessica Collins	8 July 2025	Angus Taylor
Maria Kovacic	4 July 2026	Kerrynne Liddle	4 July 2026	Jessica Collins	8 July 2025	Angus Taylor

== National Party of Australia ==
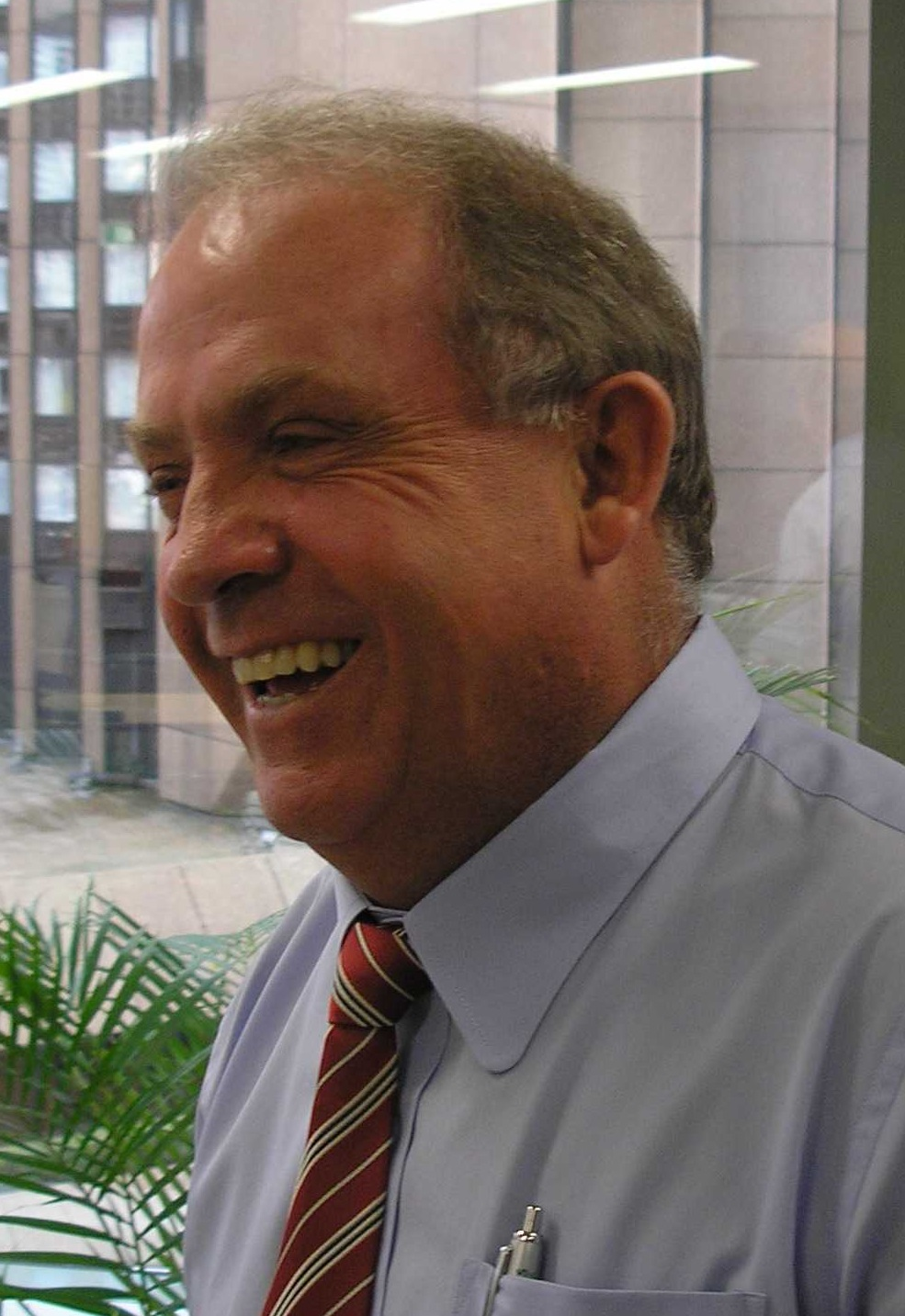
Former Nationals whip in the Senate John Williams

Whip	Date	Leader
Ron Maunsell	27 February 1973	Doug Anthony
Glen Sheil	21 February 1980	Doug Anthony
Stan Collard	17 February 1981	Doug Anthony
Stan Collard	17 February 1981	Ian Sinclair
Glen Sheil	21 February 1985	Ian Sinclair
Grant Tambling	14 September 1987	Ian Sinclair
Grant Tambling	14 September 1987	Charles Blunt
Grant Tambling	14 September 1987	Tim Fischer
David Brownhill	1 July 1990	Tim Fischer
Florence Bjelke-Petersen	23 March 1993	Tim Fischer
Bill O'Chee	1 July 1993	Tim Fischer
Julian McGauran	1 July 1999	John Anderson
Julian McGauran	1 July 1999	Mark Vaile
Nigel Scullion	7 February 2006	Mark Vaile
Fiona Nash	6 February 2007	Mark Vaile
Fiona Nash	6 February 2007	Warren Truss
John Williams	22 September 2008	Warren Truss
Bridget McKenzie	13 September 2013	Warren Truss
Barry O'Sullivan	1 July 2014	Warren Truss
Matt Canavan	10 September 2015	Warren Truss
Barry O'Sullivan	24 February 2016	Barnaby Joyce
John Williams	1 September 2016	Barnaby Joyce
John Williams	1 September 2016	Michael McCormack
Perin Davey	2 July 2019	Michael McCormack
Perin Davey	2 July 2019	Barnaby Joyce
Ross Cadell	26 July 2022	David Littleproud
Matt Canavan	21 July 2025	David Littleproud
Matt Canavan	11 March 2026	Matt Canavan
Ross Cadell	23 March 2026	Matt Canavan

== Greens ==
=== Western Australian Greens ===
In May 1996, following the 1996 election, the two members of the Western Australian Greens in the Senate announced they were to be whip and deputy whip of their party. The deputy whip, Christabel Chamarette, had lost her seat at the election, and left the Senate just over a month after the announcement. The party lost its other seat (and its whip) at the 1998 election, with her leaving office in June 1999. The party only merged with the Australian Greens in 2003, after it lost its senators.

Whip	Date	Deputy Whip	Date
Dee Margetts	20 May 1996	Christabel Chamarette	20 May 1996
Dee Margetts	20 May 1996	None	1 July 1996
None	1 July 1999	None	1 July 1996

=== Australian Greens ===
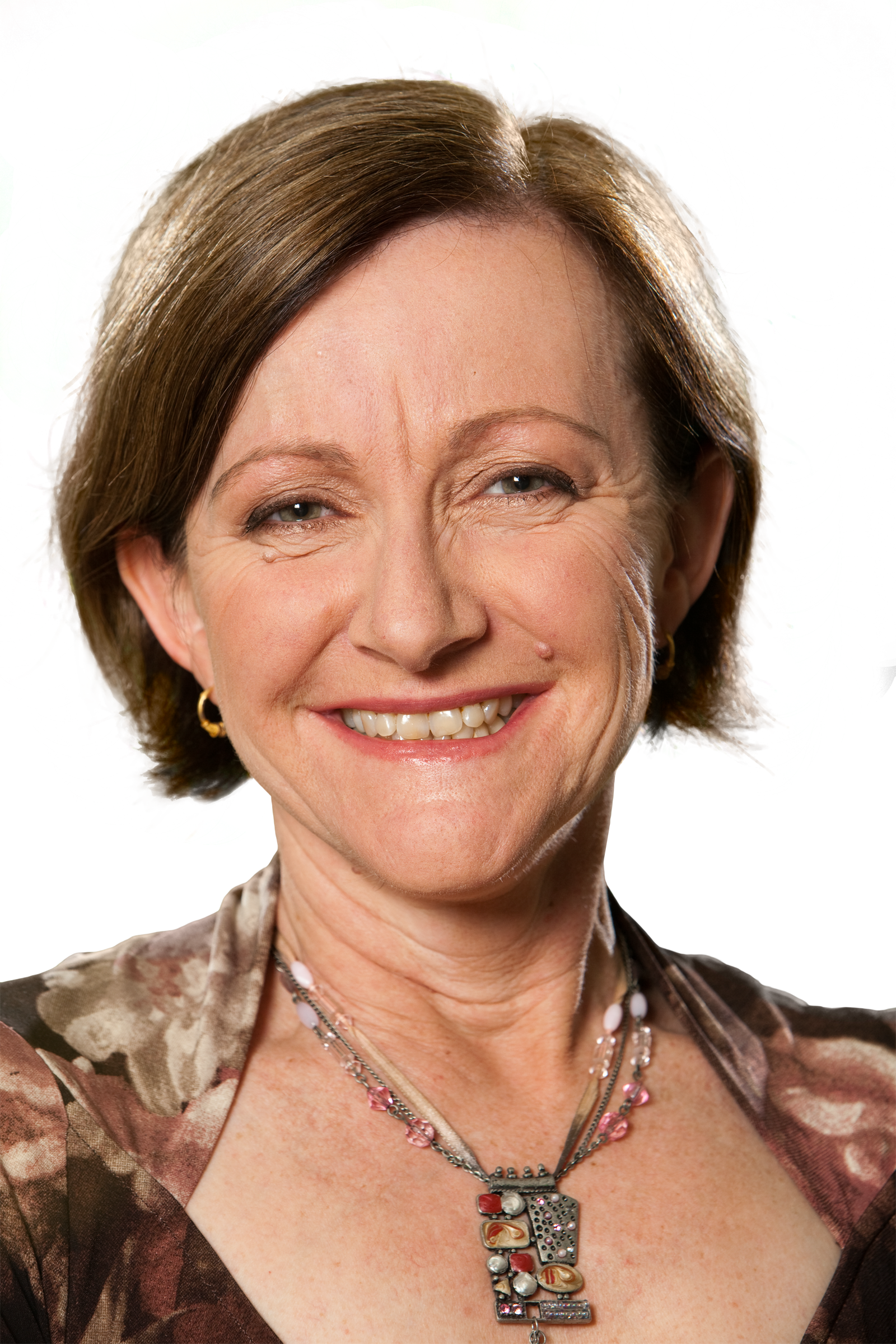
Rachel Siewert was the Greens' whip in the Senate from 2005 to 2021.

The Australian Greens appointed their first whip in the Senate when the party increased from two to four members in 2005. She became entitled to a salary when the party increased to five members in 2008.

Whip	Date	Leader
Rachel Siewert	9 August 2005	Bob Brown
Rachel Siewert	9 August 2005	Christine Milne
Rachel Siewert	9 August 2005	Richard Di Natale
Rachel Siewert	4 February 2020	Adam Bandt
Nick McKim	15 September 2021	Adam Bandt
Nick McKim	15 May 2025	Larissa Waters

== Pauline Hanson's One Nation ==
One Nation first entered the Senate in 1999, but had only one seat and consequently did not elect a whip. The party's senator was defeated in 2004 and left the Senate in 2005. In 2016, four One Nation senators were elected, and the party elected a whip for the first time.

Whip	Date	Leader
Brian Burston	1 September 2016	Pauline Hanson
Peter Georgiou	24 May 2018	Pauline Hanson
Pauline Hanson	2 July 2019	Pauline Hanson
Sean Bell	27 October 2025	Pauline Hanson

== Defunct ==
=== Free Trade/Anti-Socialist Party (1901–09) ===
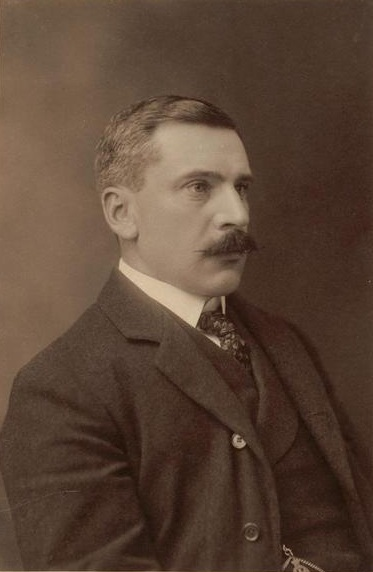
John Clemons was the Free Trade Party whip from Federation until 1907.

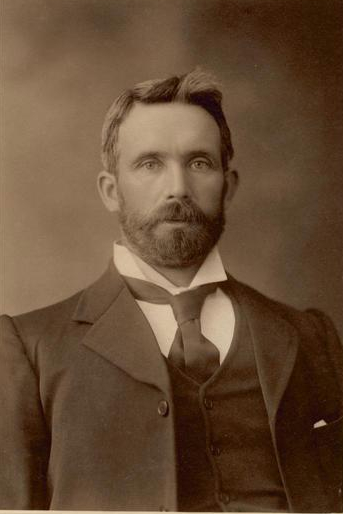
Hugh de Largie was the Senate whip for three parties: Labor, National Labor, and the Nationalists.

Whip	Date	Leader
John Clemons	1901	George Reid
Henry Dobson	21 November 1907	George Reid
Thomas Chataway	26 November 1908	Joseph Cook

=== Protectionist Party (1901–09) ===
Whip	Date	Leader
None	1901	Edmund Barton
John Keating	by 30 April 1902 (Note: Keating was initially appointed to act for the ministry, not the party, solely during the pendency of the tariff bill. However, he seems to have acted as a more traditional whip by the press during that session. Keating continued as whip into the following session, though it is not clear whether the arrangement persisted when the Protectionists went into opposition in 1904. At the latest, Keating ceased to be whip upon becoming a minister in July 1905. No Government whip was appointed.)	Edmund Barton
None	by 5 July 1905	Alfred Deakin

=== Commonwealth Liberal Party (1909–17) ===
Whip	Date	Leader
Thomas Chataway	21 June 1909	Alfred Deakin
Thomas Chataway	21 June 1909	Joseph Cook
Unclear (Note: Chataway's term as a senator ended on 30 June 1913. In June 1913, immediately before the formation of the Cook Ministry, there was speculation Senator Keating would become whip, but this does not appear to have eventuated. The Liberals may have chosen not to appoint a whip because they had only seven (of 36) senators, three of whom were in the ministry. This proposition receives some support from a mocking question asked by Senator Ready, the Labor whip: "I should like the Honorary Minister to inform the Senate who is the Whip of the large party sitting opposite?" The only answer came from a fellow Labor senator, James Long, who said, "They are all crackers. I do not know who is Whip." Various Liberals acted as teller during the Cook government, and while Thomas Bakhap and Charles Oakes did so the most, there is no evidence from Hansard that either was the whip. Following the 1914 double dissolution, the Liberals' numbers in the Senate fell to five.)	1 July 1913	Joseph Cook

=== National Labor (1916–17) ===
Whip	Date	Leader
Hugh de Largie	14 November 1916	Billy Hughes

=== Nationalist Party of Australia (1917–31) ===
Whip	Date	Leader
Hugh de Largie	13 June 1917 (Note: Senator de Largie was the National Labor whip, continued as Senate whip after the formation of the National Labor and Liberal coalition in February 1917, and remained whip after the parties merged on 13 June 1917.)	Billy Hughes
Edmund Drake-Brockman	10 February 1923	Stanley Bruce
Walter Duncan	c. 3 July 1925	Stanley Bruce
Harry Foll	1 July 1926	Stanley Bruce
Harry Foll	1 July 1926	John Latham

=== United Australia Party (1931–45) ===
Whip	Date	Leader
Harry Foll	7 May 1931	Joseph Lyons
George McLeay	29 November 1937 (Note: McLeay was in post by 4 December 1937, and caucus elections were held and portfolios assigned on 29 November.)	Joseph Lyons
Dick Dein	7 November 1938	Joseph Lyons
Dick Dein	7 November 1938	Robert Menzies
Allan MacDonald	8 October 1941	Billy Hughes
Allan MacDonald	8 October 1941	Robert Menzies
James McLachlan	July 1944? (Note: From July 1944, James McLachlan took over the duties associated with a whip, acting as a teller in divisions and requesting leave of absence for his party's senators. Except for periods when McLachlan was himself on leave and Burford Sampson performed those duties, McLachlan continued to act in the role of whip, suggesting he was elected to replace MacDonald in July 1944 (when senators elected at the 1943 election took their seats) and continued until June 1947, when he and all sitting Liberal were forced to vacate their seats following the party's electoral annihilation at the 1946.)	Robert Menzies

=== Australian Democrats (1977–2015) ===
The Australian Democrats first elected a whip in 1981, reflecting an increase from two to five of the party's Senate membership. The party lost all its seats at the 2007 election, and its senators duly left their seats the following June.

Whip	Date	Leader
Michael Macklin	by 19 November 1981	Don Chipp
Michael Macklin	by 19 November 1981	Janine Haines
Paul McLean	by 31 October 1989	Janine Haines
Paul McLean	by 31 October 1989	Janet Powell
Vicki Bourne	3 September 1991	John Coulter
Vicki Bourne	3 September 1991	Cheryl Kernot
Vicki Bourne	3 September 1991	Meg Lees
Vicki Bourne	3 September 1991	Natasha Stott Despoja
Lyn Allison	1 July 2002	Andrew Bartlett
Andrew Bartlett	13 December 2004	Lyn Allison
None	1 July 2008	

== Nick Xenophon Team ==
Senator Nick Xenophon entered the Senate as an independent in 2008. In 2016 he ran as part of the Nick Xenophon Team, which saw Xenophon and two of his running mates (and a lower house MP) elected, so the Nick Xenophon Team elected a whip.

Whip	Date	Leader
Skye Kakoschke-Moore	1 September 2016	Nick Xenophon

== Democratic Labour Party ==
The Democratic Labour Party (until 2013 the Democratic Labor Party) elected its first whip in 1968, when its membership increased from two to four. The party continued to do so until 1974, when the party lost all its seats at the double dissolution election. The party re-entered the Senate following the 2010 election, but did not have a whip as it only had one senator, who left the party in 2014.

Whip	Date	Leader
Condon Byrne	13 August 1968	Vince Gair
Jack Little	10 October 1973	Frank McManus
None	10 May 1974	

== Palmer United Party ==
The Palmer United Party won three Senate seats at the 2013 election, the new senators taking their seats on 1 July 2014. Two of the three had left within a year, but the remaining senator retained the position of whip until his defeat in 2016.

Whip	Date	Leader
Zhenya Wang	1 July 2014	Glenn Lazarus
None	9 May 2016	
