= Members of the Australian Senate, 2011–2014 =

Senate composition at 1 July 2011
Government (31) - (8 seat minority)
Labor (31)

Opposition (34)
Liberal (28)
National Party (6)

Crossbench (11)
Greens (9)
Democratic Labour (1)
Independent (Xenophon) (1)

This is a list of members of the Australian Senate between 2011 and 2014. Half of the state senators had been elected at the November 2007 election and had terms due to finish on 30 June 2014; the other half of the state senators were elected at the August 2010 election and had terms due to finish on 30 June 2017. The territory senators were elected at the August 2010 election and their terms ended at the next federal election, which was September 2013. The new Senate first met in July 2011, with state senators elected in 2010 sworn in on 4 July 2011.

Senator	Party	State	Term ending	Years in office
Eric Abetz	Liberal	Tasmania	2017	1994–2022
Judith Adams (Note: Western Australian senator Judith Adams died of breast cancer on 31 March 2012. The Parliament of Western Australia appointed Dean Smith as her replacement on 2 May 2012.)	Liberal	Western Australia	2017	2005–2012
Mark Arbib (Note: New South Wales Labor senator Mark Arbib resigned on 5 March 2012. Former New South Wales Premier Bob Carr was appointed as his replacement on 6 March 2012.)	Labor	New South Wales	2014	2008–2012
Chris Back	Liberal	Western Australia	2017	2009–2017
Cory Bernardi	Liberal	South Australia	2014	2006–2020
Catryna Bilyk	Labor	Tasmania	2014	2008–2025
Simon Birmingham	Liberal	South Australia	2014	2007–2025
Mark Bishop	Labor	Western Australia	2014	1996–2014
Ron Boswell	National (Note: Senators Boswell, Joyce and O'Sullivan were members of the Liberal National Party of Queensland who sat in the National party room.)	Queensland	2014	1983–2014
Sue Boyce	Liberal (Note: Senators Boyce, Brandis, Mason and Macdonald were members of the Liberal National Party of Queensland who sat in the Liberal party room.)	Queensland	2014	2007–2014
George Brandis	Liberal	Queensland	2017	2000–2018
Bob Brown (Note: Tasmanian Greens senator Bob Brown resigned on 15 June 2012. The Parliament of Tasmania appointed Peter Whish-Wilson as his replacement on 20 June 2012.)	Greens	Tasmania	2014	1996–2012
Carol Brown	Labor	Tasmania	2014	2005–present
David Bushby	Liberal	Tasmania	2017	2007–2019
Doug Cameron	Labor	New South Wales	2014	2008–2019
Bob Carr (Note: New South Wales Labor senator Bob Carr resigned on 24 October 2013, after the election in September 2013, creating two vacancies, the balance of his term & the new term starting on 1 July 2014. On 13 November 2013 Deborah O'Neill, who had lost her House of Representatives seat at the 2013 federal election, was appointed to the vacancy from 24 October 2013 to 30 June 2014. On 2 July 2013 O'Neill was appointed to the vacancy in the new term starting 1 July 2014.)	Labor	New South Wales	2014	2012–2013
Kim Carr	Labor	Victoria	2017	1993–2022
Michaelia Cash	Liberal	Western Australia	2014	2008–present
Richard Colbeck	Liberal	Tasmania	2014	2002–2016, 2018–present
Jacinta Collins	Labor	Victoria	2014	1995–2005, 2008–2019
Stephen Conroy	Labor	Victoria	2017	1996–2016
Helen Coonan (Note: New South Wales Liberal senator Helen Coonan resigned on 22 August 2011. Arthur Sinodinos was appointed as her replacement on 13 October 2011.)	Liberal	New South Wales	2014	1996–2011
Mathias Cormann	Liberal	Western Australia	2017	2008–2020
Trish Crossin (Note: Northern Territory Labor senator Trish Crossin was succeeded at the 2013 election by party colleague Nova Peris who assumed her seat immediately under electoral law.)	Labor	Northern Territory	2013 (Note: The term of a territory senator ends at the dissolution of the House of Representatives, which was September 2013.)	1998–2013
Sam Dastyari (Note: New South Wales Labor senator Matt Thistlethwaite resigned on 9 August to contest the House of Representatives seat of Kingsford Smith.Sam Dastyari was appointed as his replacement on 21 August.)	Labor	New South Wales	2017	2013–2018
Richard Di Natale	Greens	Victoria	2017	2011–2020
Sean Edwards	Liberal	South Australia	2017	2011–2016
Alan Eggleston	Liberal	Western Australia	2014	1996–2014
Chris Evans (Note: Western Australian Labor senator Chris Evans resigned on 12 April 2013. Sue Lines was appointed as his replacement on 15 May 2013.)	Labor	Western Australia	2017	1993–2013
Don Farrell	Labor	South Australia	2014	2008–2014, 2016–present
John Faulkner	Labor	New South Wales	2017	1989–2015
David Fawcett	Liberal	South Australia	2017	2011–2025
David Feeney (Note: Victorian Labor senator David Feeney resigned on 12 August to contest the House of Representatives seat of Batman. Mehmet Tillem was appointed by the Victorian Parliament as Feeney's replacement on the same day.)	Labor	Victoria	2014	2008–2013
Concetta Fierravanti-Wells	Liberal	New South Wales	2017	2005–2022
Mitch Fifield	Liberal	Victoria	2014	2004–2019
Mary Jo Fisher (Note: South Australian Liberal senator Mary Jo Fisher resigned on 14 August 2012. Anne Ruston was appointed as her replacement on 5 September 2012.)	Liberal	South Australia	2017	2007–2012
Mark Furner	Labor	Queensland	2014	2008–2014
Alex Gallacher	Labor	South Australia	2017	2011–2021
Sarah Hanson-Young	Greens	South Australia	2014	2008–present
Bill Heffernan	Liberal	New South Wales	2017	1996–2016
John Hogg	Labor	Queensland	2014	1996–2014
Gary Humphries (Note: Australian Capital Territory Liberal senator Gary Humphries was succeeded at the 2013 election by party colleague Zed Seselja who assumed his seat immediately under electoral law.)	Liberal	Australian Capital Territory	2013	2003–2013
David Johnston	Liberal	Western Australia	2014	2002–2016
Barnaby Joyce (Note: Queensland Nationals senator Barnaby Joyce resigned on 8 August to contest the House of Representatives seat of New England at the 2013 federal election. Barry O'Sullivan was nominated to fill Joyce's vacancy, however his appointment was delayed until 11 February 2014 due to his involvement in an investigation by the Crime and Misconduct Commission.)	National	Queensland	2017	2005–2013
Helen Kroger	Liberal	Victoria	2014	2008–2014
Sue Lines	Labor	Western Australia	2017	2013–present
Scott Ludlam	Greens	Western Australia	2014	2008–2017
Joe Ludwig	Labor	Queensland	2017	1999–2016
Kate Lundy	Labor	Australian Capital Territory	2013	1996–2015
Ian Macdonald	Liberal	Queensland	2014	1990–2019
John Madigan	Democratic Labour	Victoria	2017	2011–2016
Gavin Marshall	Labor	Victoria	2014	2002–2019
Brett Mason	Liberal	Queensland	2017	1999–2015
Anne McEwen	Labor	South Australia	2017	2005–2016
Bridget McKenzie	National	Victoria	2017	2011–present
Jan McLucas	Labor	Queensland	2017	1999–2016
Christine Milne	Greens	Tasmania	2017	2005–2015
Claire Moore	Labor	Queensland	2014	2002–2019
Fiona Nash	National	New South Wales	2017	2005–2017
Deborah O'Neill	Labor	New South Wales	2014	2013–present
Barry O'Sullivan	National	Queensland	2017	2014–2019
Marise Payne	Liberal	New South Wales	2014	1997–2023
Stephen Parry	Liberal	Tasmania	2017	2005–2017
Nova Peris	Labor	Northern Territory	2016 (Note: Elected as a territory senator in 2013 for a term ending at the next dissolution of the House of Representatives, which was July 2016.)	2013–2016
Helen Polley	Labor	Tasmania	2017	2005–present
Louise Pratt	Labor	Western Australia	2014	2008–2014, 2016–2025
Lee Rhiannon	Greens	New South Wales	2017	2011–2018
Michael Ronaldson	Liberal	Victoria	2017	2005–2016
Anne Ruston	Liberal	South Australia	2017	2012–present
Scott Ryan	Liberal	Victoria	2014	2008–2021
Nigel Scullion	National (Note: Northern Territory senator Nigel Scullion was a member of the Country Liberal Party who sat in the National party room, serving as the National Party deputy leader in the Senate.)	Northern Territory	2013	2001–2019
Zed Seselja	Liberal	Australian Capital Territory	2016	2013–2022
Nick Sherry (Note: Tasmanian Labor senator Nick Sherry resigned on 1 June 2012. The Parliament of Tasmania appointed former state MLC Lin Thorp as his replacement on 20 June 2012.)	Labor	Tasmania	2014	1990–2012
Rachel Siewert	Greens	Western Australia	2017	2005–2021
Lisa Singh	Labor	Tasmania	2017	2011–2019
Arthur Sinodinos	Liberal	New South Wales	2014	2011–2019
Dean Smith	Liberal	Western Australia	2017	2012–present
Ursula Stephens	Labor	New South Wales	2014	2002–2014
Glenn Sterle	Labor	Western Australia	2017	2005–present
Matt Thistlethwaite	Labor	New South Wales	2017	2011–2013
Lin Thorp	Labor	Tasmania	2014	2012–2014
Mehmet Tillem	Labor	Victoria	2014	2013–2014
Anne Urquhart	Labor	Tasmania	2017	2011–present
Larissa Waters	Greens	Queensland	2017	2011–2017, 2018–present
Peter Whish-Wilson	Greens	Tasmania	2014	2012–present
John Williams	National	New South Wales	2014	2008–2019
Penny Wong	Labor	South Australia	2014	2002–present
Penny Wright	Greens	South Australia	2017	2011–2015
Nick Xenophon	Independent	South Australia	2014	2008–2017
