= Wendy Askew =

Australian politician

Chief Opposition Whip in the Senate
- In office 26 July 2022 – 15 July 2026
- Deputy: Paul Scarr (2022–24, 2026–); Matt O'Sullivan (2022–25); Maria Kovacic (2024–25); Leah Blyth (2025–26); Jessica Collins (2025–)
- Leader: Peter Dutton (2022–25); Sussan Ley (2025–26); Angus Taylor (2026–)
- Preceded by: Anne Urquhart
- Succeeded by: Maria Kovacic

Senator for Tasmania
- In office 6 March 2019 – 10 August 2026
- Preceded by: David Bushby
- Succeeded by: Chris Gatenby

Personal details
- Born: Wendy Anne Bushby; 16 March 1963 (age 63) Launceston, Tasmania, Australia
- Party: Liberal
- Relations: Max Bushby (father); David Bushby (brother)

Wendy Anne Askew (née Bushby; formerly Summers; born 16 March 1963) is an Australian politician who was a Senator for Tasmania, representing the Liberal Party. She was appointed to a casual vacancy on 6 March 2019 in place of her brother David Bushby. She resigned from the Senate on 10 August 2026.

== Personal life ==
Askew was born in Launceston, Tasmania. Her father Max Bushby and brother David Bushby were also Liberal politicians. She was known as Wendy Summers until her marriage in September 2018.

== Professional life ==
Prior to entering politics, Askew worked in a variety of roles in the public and private sectors. She was general manager of the St Giles Society, a disability services provider, and also spent 20 years in the banking industry, including roles with Westpac and the Commonwealth Bank. She later worked as office manager to state MP Michael Ferguson and as an adviser to state MP Sarah Courtney and federal MP Andrew Nikolic. Immediately prior to her elevation to the Senate she was working as an adviser to federal education minister Dan Tehan.

Askew held various senior positions in the Tasmanian Liberals, serving on the state executive, as party treasurer, and as a senior vice-president of the party. In 2018, it was reported that she would be a candidate for Senate preselection for the 2019 federal election.

=== Senate ===
Askew's brother David Bushby announced his retirement from the Senate in January 2019. She subsequently defeated seven other candidates to become the Liberal Party's nominee for the casual vacancy caused by his resignation. She served the remainder of his six-year term, which expired in June 2022. Askew was temporarily appointed to the Senate on 6 March 2019 by state governor Kate Warner under the provisions of section 15 of the constitution, as the state parliament was not in session. A joint sitting of the state parliament on 20 March 2019 formalised her appointment to the Senate.

She was elected to the Senate at the 2022 election. Askew is the fourth woman to represent the Tasmanian Liberals in federal parliament and the first since Jocelyn Newman retired in 2002.

After the Coalition's defeat at the 2022 federal election, Askew was appointed Chief Opposition Whip in the Senate – her brother had previously served as the Coalition's chief whip when they were in government.

Askew is affiliated with the National Right faction of the Liberal Party, after previously being factionally unaligned during the Morrison government years.

On 11 June 2026, Askew announced she would not recontest her seat.

On 3 July 2026, it was confirmed fellow Liberal Senator Maria Kovacic was elected to fill her position as Chief Opposition Whip in the Senate, commencing on 15 July.

On 10 August 2026, Askew resigned from the Senate after candidates were preselected on 8 August for the Liberal Senate ticket at the next federal election. Chris Gatenby was selected first on the ticket and was on 13 August 2026 appointed by the Tasmanian Parliament to fill Askew’s place.
