= David Bushby =

Australian politician

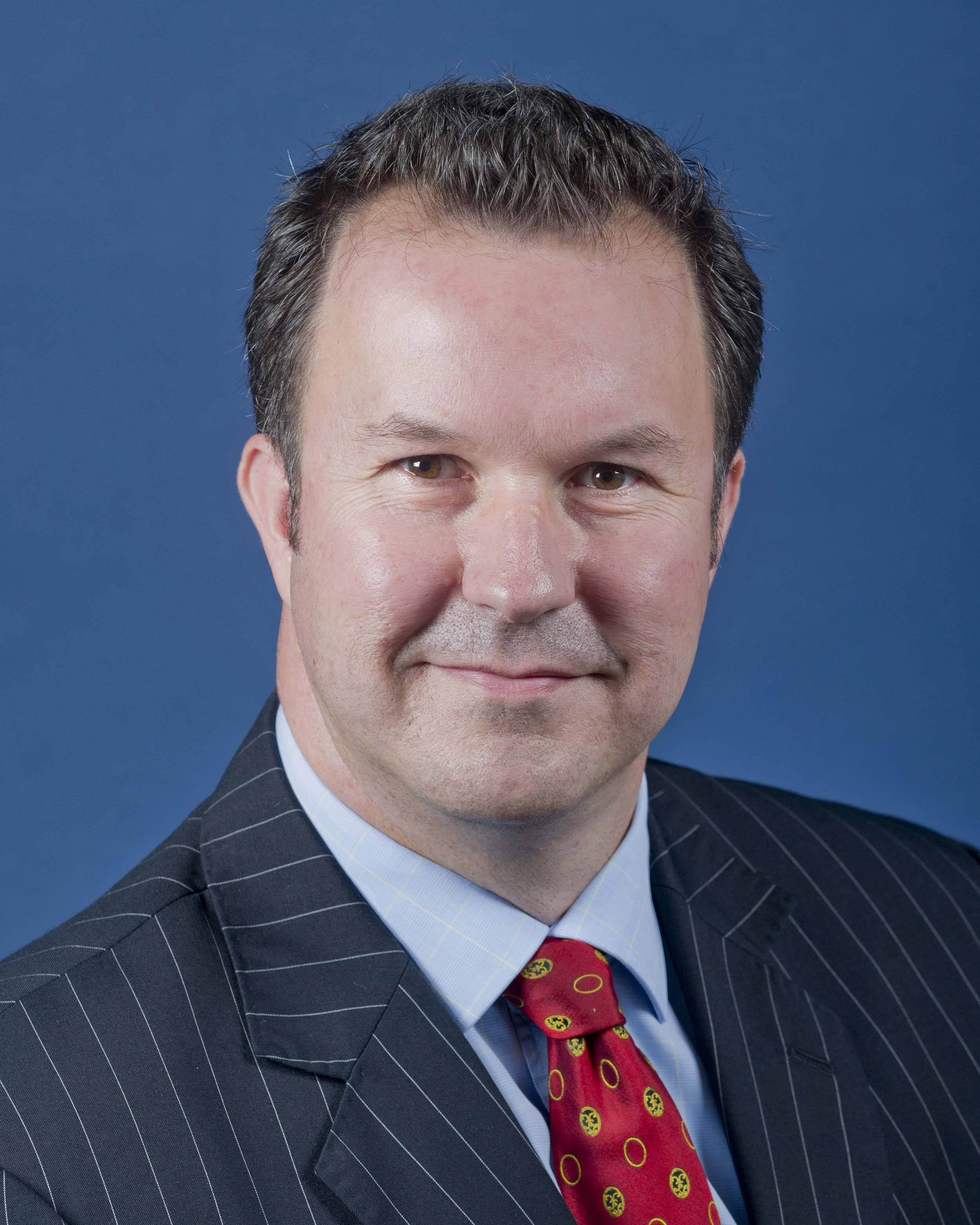

Consul-General of Australia in Chicago
- In office January 2019 – March 2022
- Preceded by: Michael Wood
- Succeeded by: Chris Elstoft

Chief Government Whip in the Senate
- In office 1 July 2014 – 21 January 2019
- Prime Minister: Tony Abbott; Malcolm Turnbull; Scott Morrison
- Preceded by: Helen Kroger
- Succeeded by: Dean Smith

Senator for Tasmania
- In office 30 August 2007 – 21 January 2019
- Preceded by: Paul Calvert

Personal details
- Born: David Christopher Bushby; 17 July 1965 (age 61) Launceston, Tasmania, Australia
- Party: Liberal
- Relations: Max Bushby (father); Wendy Askew (sister)
- Children: Three daughters
- Education: University of Tasmania
- Profession: Lawyer
- Website: www.davidbushby.com.au

David Christopher Bushby (born 17 July 1965) is an Australian diplomat and former politician who served as a Senator for Tasmania from August 2007 to January 2019, representing the Liberal Party. He was the Chief Government Whip in the Senate for the Abbott, Turnbull and Morrison governments from 1 July 2014 until he resigned on 21 January 2019. Bushby currently serves as Consul-General of Australia in Chicago since 2019.

== Early life ==
Bushby was born in Launceston, Tasmania, the son of Max Bushby, a Tasmanian MP and later Speaker of the State House of Assembly. He was educated at the University of Tasmania, where he graduated in economics and law, and the Australian Maritime College, from where he received a diploma in business. Prior to entering parliament, Bushby was a practising lawyer and political adviser.

== Politics ==
In May 2007, Bushby was preselected for Tasmanian Liberal Senate ticket in the number two position ahead of the 2007 election. Consequently, Bushby appeared destined to enter the federal parliament at the beginning of the next Senate term in July 2008 given the highly electable nature of this position on the ticket. In fact his entry to federal parliament came sooner. On 30 August 2007, Bushby was appointed to the Senate by the Tasmanian parliament to fill the casual vacancy caused by the resignation of Paul Calvert.

On 18 January 2019, Bushby announced his resignation from the Senate, effective on 21 January. Minister for Foreign Affairs Marise Payne announced an hour later that Bushby would be nominated as Australia's consul-general in Chicago. The Tasmanian Liberals preselected his sister Wendy Askew as his replacement in the Senate; she served the remainder of his six-year term, which expired in June 2022.

Diplomatic posts
Preceded by Michael Wood	Consul-General of Australia in Chicago; 2019–present	Incumbent
