= Maria Kovacic =

Australian politician

Senator Maria Kovacic
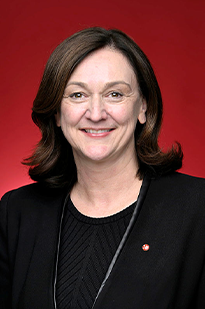

Chief Opposition Whip in the Senate
- Incumbent
- Assumed office 15 July 2026
- Deputy: Jessica Collins; Kerrynne Liddle
- Preceded by: Wendy Askew

Deputy Opposition Whip in the Senate
- In office 14 March 2024 – 8 July 2025 Serving with Matt O'Sullivan (2024–25), Jessica Collins (2025–)
- Preceded by: Paul Scarr
- Succeeded by: Leah Blyth

Senator for New South Wales
- Incumbent
- Assumed office 31 May 2023
- Preceded by: Jim Molan

President of the New South Wales Liberal Party
- In office 5 October 2022 – April 2023
- Preceded by: Philip Ruddock
- Succeeded by: Jason Falinski

Personal details
- Born: 11 February 1970 (age 56) Queanbeyan, New South Wales, Australia
- Party: Liberal
- Occupation: Politician

Maria Kovacic (Croatian: [ˈmǎrija ˈkǒʋatʃitɕ]; born 1970) is an Australian politician. She is a Senator for New South Wales representing the Liberal Party, succeeding Jim Molan after his death.

She previously served as the President of the New South Wales Liberal Party.

== Early life ==
Kovacic was born in 1970 in Queanbeyan, New South Wales. Her parents were Bosnian Croats who immigrated to Australia from Yugoslavia after the Second World War. Her father was born in Turčinovići and her mother in Miši.

Kovacic grew up in Canberra. She was the franchisee of an ANZ mobile lending franchise for 16 years. She was a director of the Franchise Council of Australia from 2020 to 2023 and was active in various community groups in Western Sydney.

== Politics ==
=== 2022 federal election ===
Kovacic was the Liberal Party's candidate for the marginal Labor seat of Parramatta at the 2022 federal election, held by retiring MP Julie Owens. Although the seat was considered a highly possible gain for the party (due to Owens' retirement and the fact that much of the seat's territory was Liberal-held at state level at the time), she was unsuccessful and Labor's candidate Andrew Charlton won the seat with an increased majority.

=== President of the New South Wales Division (2022–2023) ===
On 5 October 2022, Kovacic was elected President of the New South Wales division of the Liberal Party.

=== Senate (2023–present) ===
==== Preselection ====
Following the death of Jim Molan in 2023, the Liberal Party needed to fill a casual vacancy. The final two candidates, both from the party's Moderate faction, were Kovacic and Andrew Constance, a former New South Wales Cabinet minister who served as the member for Bega in the Legislative Assembly until his resignation in 2021.

On 3 July 2026, it was confirmed that Kovacic was elected to fill the position as Chief Opposition Whip in the Senate, commencing on 15 July, after Wendy Askew announced her retirement.

Kovacic won the support of most Moderates, as well as most of the Centre Right faction. The Right faction's only candidate was Jess Collins. The other candidates were James Brown, David Brady and Fiona Scott. According to Anthony Galloway writing for the Sydney Morning Herald, Constance made a deal with sections of the Right faction whereby he, if elected, would resign after 18 months to run as the party's candidate for the seat of Gilmore at the 2025 federal election for a second time, after he almost defeated the sitting Labor member (Fiona Phillips) at the 2022 federal election (bucking the national trend of swings against the Coalition). However, senior party sources found that many were unhappy with the idea of another resignation.

Kovacic was endorsed by Senator Andrew Bragg and deputy leader Sussan Ley, while Constance was endorsed by former Liberal Premier Gladys Berejiklian, Senator Marise Payne and her partner, former state Cabinet minister Stuart Ayres (who was the state member for Penrith until 2023).

The vote was held at the Fullerton Hotel in Sydney on 27 May 2023. Kovacic was preselected, winning 287 votes to Constance's 243.

Kovacic was appointed by a joint sitting of the New South Wales Parliament on 31 May 2023.

On 3 July 2026, it was confirmed that Kovacic was elected to fill the position as Chief Opposition Whip in the Senate, commencing on 15 July, following the retirement of Wendy Askew.

=== Political positions ===
In her maiden speech to parliament Kovacic described herself as a "progressive liberal". She also called for a cap to be placed on negative gearing for investment properties.
