= Chris Gatenby =

Australian politician

Senator Chris Gatenby

Senator for Tasmania
- Incumbent
- Assumed office 13 August 2026
- Preceded by: Wendy Askew

Personal details
- Born: Tasmania
- Party: Liberal
- Children: 2

Christopher John Arnold Gatenby is an Australian politician and a Senator for Tasmania representing the Liberal Party. He was appointed to the Senate by a joint sitting of the Parliament of Tasmania on 13 August 2026, to replace retiring Senator Wendy Askew. He will serve the remainder of Askew's term which will expire in 2028.

Gatenby was preselected for his Senate appointment on 8 August 2026. He was a senior advisor to Jeremy Rockliff, the state premier at the time. He was also formerly the party president of the Tasmanian Division of the Liberal Party between August 2022 and 2023, and the chief of staff to federal Liberal minister Richard Colbeck in 2020. He previously contested the 2024 and 2025 state elections as one of Liberal Party candidates for the lower house seat of Bass, but he was not elected in either occasion.

== Personal life ==
Gatenby's ancestors Andrew and Hannah Gatenby arrived in Hobart, Tasmania from Scarborough, Yorkshire, England in 1823.

Chris is a seventh generation Tasmanian in his family. He was raised in a farm in northern Tasmania and then lived in Launceston. He is married with two children.
