= Paul Scarr =

Australian politician

Senator Paul Scarr

Opposition Deputy Whip in the Senate
- Incumbent
- Assumed office 23 February 2026 Serving with Jessica Collins
- Leader: Angus Taylor
- Preceded by: Leah Blyth
- In office 26 July 2022 – 14 March 2024 Serving with Matt O'Sullivan
- Leader: Peter Dutton
- Preceded by: Jonathon Duniam
- Succeeded by: Maria Kovacic

Deputy Manager of Opposition Business in the Senate
- In office 28 May 2025 – 17 February 2026
- Leader: Sussan Ley
- Succeeded by: Matt O'Sullivan

Senator for Queensland
- Incumbent
- Assumed office 1 July 2019
- Preceded by: Ian Macdonald

Personal details
- Born: 20 August 1969 (age 57) Sydney, New South Wales, Australia
- Party: Liberal / LNP
- Spouse: Louise Scarr
- Education: University of Queensland
- Profession: Lawyer

Paul Martin Scarr (born 20 August 1969) is an Australian politician and lawyer who was elected as a Senator for Queensland at the 2019 federal election. He is a member of the Liberal National Party of Queensland and sits with the Liberal Party in federal parliament.

== Early life ==
Scarr was born in Sydney on 20 August 1969, the son of Diane Berry and David Scarr. He moved to Queensland with his family at the age of seven, attending Ipswich Grammar School. He went on to complete the degrees of Bachelor of Laws (Hons.) and Bachelor of Commerce at the University of Queensland.

== Career ==
Scarr served his articles of clerkship at Allens in Brisbane, before joining the firm as a solicitor in 1994. He was a senior associate with the firm's Papua New Guinea division from 1999 to 2001. After returning to Australia he joined King & Wood Mallesons in 2005. In 2007, Scarr was appointed general counsel and company secretary of PanAust Limited, an Australian company with mining operations in Laos.

== Politics ==
Scarr joined the Liberal Party in 1987 and held office in the Young Liberals. He was chairman of the party's Hawken Drive (St Lucia) branch from 1997 to 1999. Following the creation of the Liberal National Party of Queensland he served on the electorate councils for the state seats of Indooroopilly and Miller and the federal seat of Moreton.

In July 2018, Scarr won LNP preselection as the lead candidate on the party's Senate ticket in Queensland. The results of the ballot saw incumbent senators Ian Macdonald and Barry O'Sullivan lose their previous positions on the ticket.

At the 2019 federal election, Scarr was elected to a six-year term beginning on 1 July 2019. He has served on various Senate committees, including as chair of the economics references and the legal and constitutional affairs references committees. In July 2022, following the Coalition's defeat at the 2022 federal election, Scarr was appointed as a deputy opposition whip. Scarr is also currently serving on the Parliamentary Joint Committee on Corporations and Financial Services.

=== Positions ===
Scarr is a member of the Moderate faction of the Liberal Party, after previously being aligned with the Centre-Right faction of the Liberal Party.
