= Josh Dolega =

Australian politician

Senator Josh Dolega
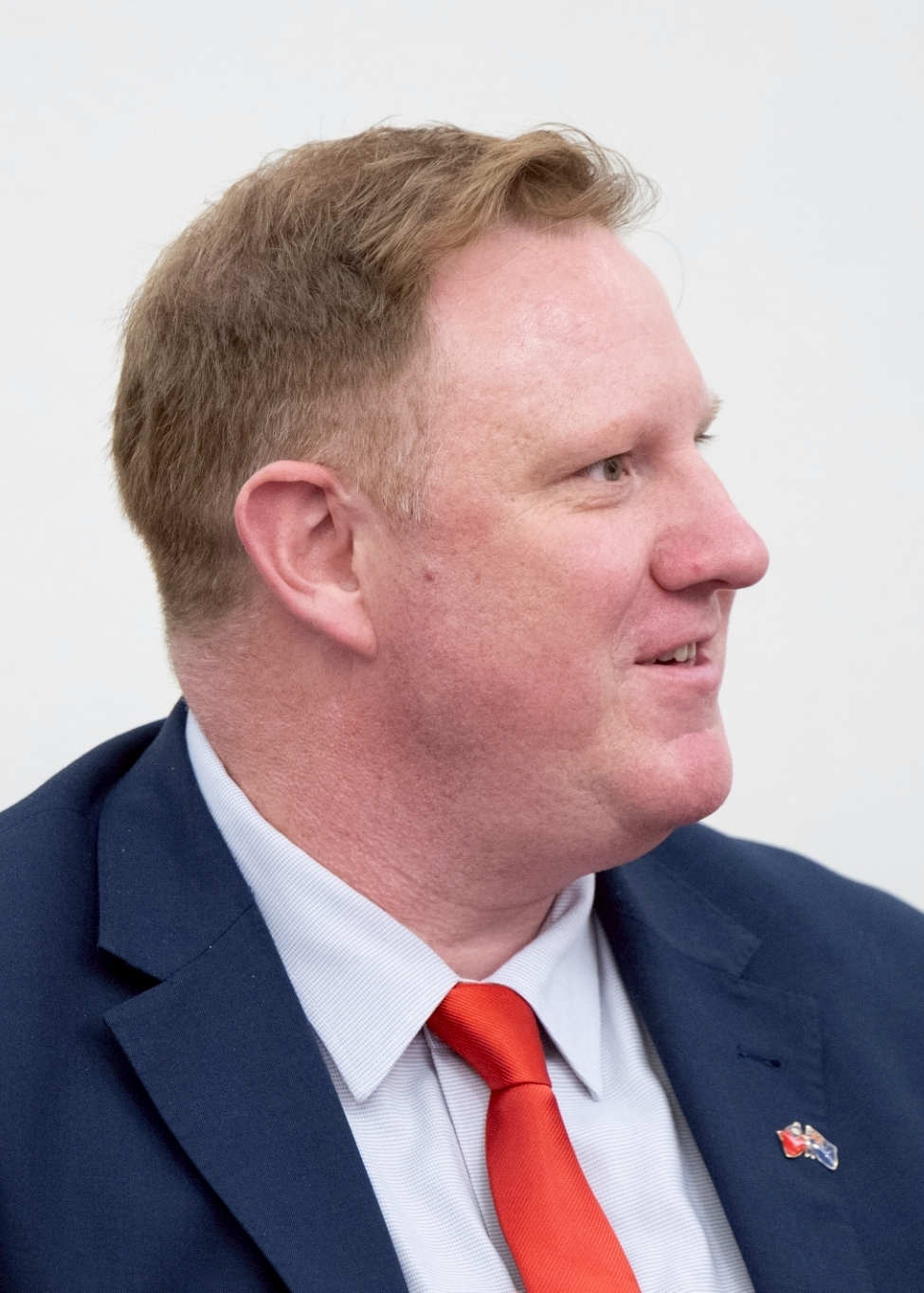
- Dolega in 2026

Senator for Tasmania
- Incumbent
- Assumed office 27 May 2025
- Preceded by: Anne Urquhart

Personal details
- Born: 13 December 1983 (age 42) Devonport, Tasmania, Australia
- Party: Labor
- Other political affiliations: Labor Left
- Occupation: Fitness instructor, tax officer, union official

Josh Dolega (born 13 December 1983) is an Australian politician. He is a member of the Australian Labor Party (ALP) and has been a senator for Tasmania since 2025. He was appointed to fill a casual vacancy caused by the resignation of Senator Anne Urquhart.

== Early life and career ==
Dolega was born on 13 December 1983 in Devonport, Tasmania. He grew up in Spreyton. Prior to entering federal parliament, Dolega was a group fitness instructor at Devonport Aquatic Centre, then a tax officer for the Australian Taxation Office at Burnie for more than 15 years, before becoming the work health and safety lead organiser at the Community and Public Sector Union (CPSU).

== Political career ==
Senator Anne Urquhart resigned from the Senate in March 2025 to contest the Division of Braddon at the May 2025 federal election, and was successfully elected to Braddon. Her resignation created a casual vacancy in the Senate. At the time, the two-year administration of Tasmanian Labor by the National Executive had ended, but a new state administrative committee had not yet been appointed, so Urquhart's casual vacancy in the Senate would still be chosen by the National Executive.

Dolega had the support of Urquhart and the Australian Manufacturing Workers Union. He was confirmed as Urquhart's replacement by the National Executive on 23 May 2025, defeating higher profile Labor members including a union secretary, a local councillor and a former secretary of the Tasmanian Labor Party. He was appointed to the Senate via a joint sitting of the Parliament of Tasmania on 27 May 2025. He will serve the remainder of Urquhart's term which will expire in 2028.

Dolega is a member of the Labor Left.

== Personal life ==
Prior to being appointed to the Senate, Dolega was living in Hobart as of May 2025, but had said he was "happy to relocate" to the north-west coast where Urquhart had been based. Dolega is also the first Tasmanian Labor senator to be openly homosexual.
