= Varun Ghosh =

Australian politician

Senator Varun Ghosh

Senator for Western Australia
- Incumbent
- Assumed office 1 February 2024
- Preceded by: Pat Dodson

Personal details
- Born: Varun Nagarajan Ghosh; 30 August 1985 (age 41) Canberra, Australian Capital Territory, Australia
- Party: Labor
- Education: University of Western Australia (BA, LLB); Darwin College, Cambridge (LLM)
- Profession: Politician, barrister

Varun Nagarajan Ghosh (born 30 August 1985) is an Australian politician and barrister. He has been a Senator for Western Australia since 2024, representing the Australian Labor Party (ALP). He was nominated by the ALP to fill a casual vacancy caused by the retirement of Pat Dodson. He is aligned with the Western Australian Right faction.

== Early life ==
Ghosh was born in Canberra on 30 August 1985. He is the son of Soumya Ghosh and Lakshmi Nagarajan, Indian-born Bengali and Tamil parents who were both neurologists by profession.

Ghosh moved to Perth with his parents in 1997, where he attended Christ Church Grammar School. He went on to study arts and law at the University of Western Australia, and later studied at Darwin College, Cambridge on the Frank Downing Law Scholarship.

== Legal career ==
Ghosh was admitted to practise law in 2009 and joined Mallesons Stephen Jaques as a solicitor. He later moved to New York City where he was an associate with White & Case from 2011 to 2013, acting for banks and private equity firms across a variety of financial transactions. He was also a consultant to the World Bank on financial institutions and insolvency law policy in developing countries.

Ghosh returned to Australia in 2015 as a senior associate with King & Wood Mallesons, representing banks, resource companies and construction companies in dispute resolution. In 2018, he began working as a barrister in private practice out of Francis Burt Chambers. He has also worked as an adjunct lecturer in law at the University of Western Australia.

== Political career ==
Ghosh joined the Australian Labor Party at the age of 17. He is a member of the Labor Right faction and has been described as having "longstanding political connections" in the Western Australian branch of the Labor Party, having previously served as the state president of Young Labor in the mid-2000s.

In 2022, Ghosh successfully defended the ALP in court against a lawsuit from Ben Dawkins over his ban from party preselection. In 2023, he co-authored a review into the Western Australian branch of the Labor Party's rules for leadership contests, which recommended that the state parliamentary caucus be given sole responsibility for selecting the party's leader while in government.

At the 2019 federal election, Ghosh was placed in fifth position on the ALP's Senate ticket in Western Australia. He was not elected.

In December 2023, Ghosh was selected as the ALP's nominee to replace Pat Dodson in the Senate, following Dodson's announcement that he would retire for health reasons in January 2024. Ghosh was appointed by the Parliament of Western Australia in a joint sitting on 1 February 2024.
