= Dean Smith (Australian politician) =

Australian politician

Senator Dean Smith
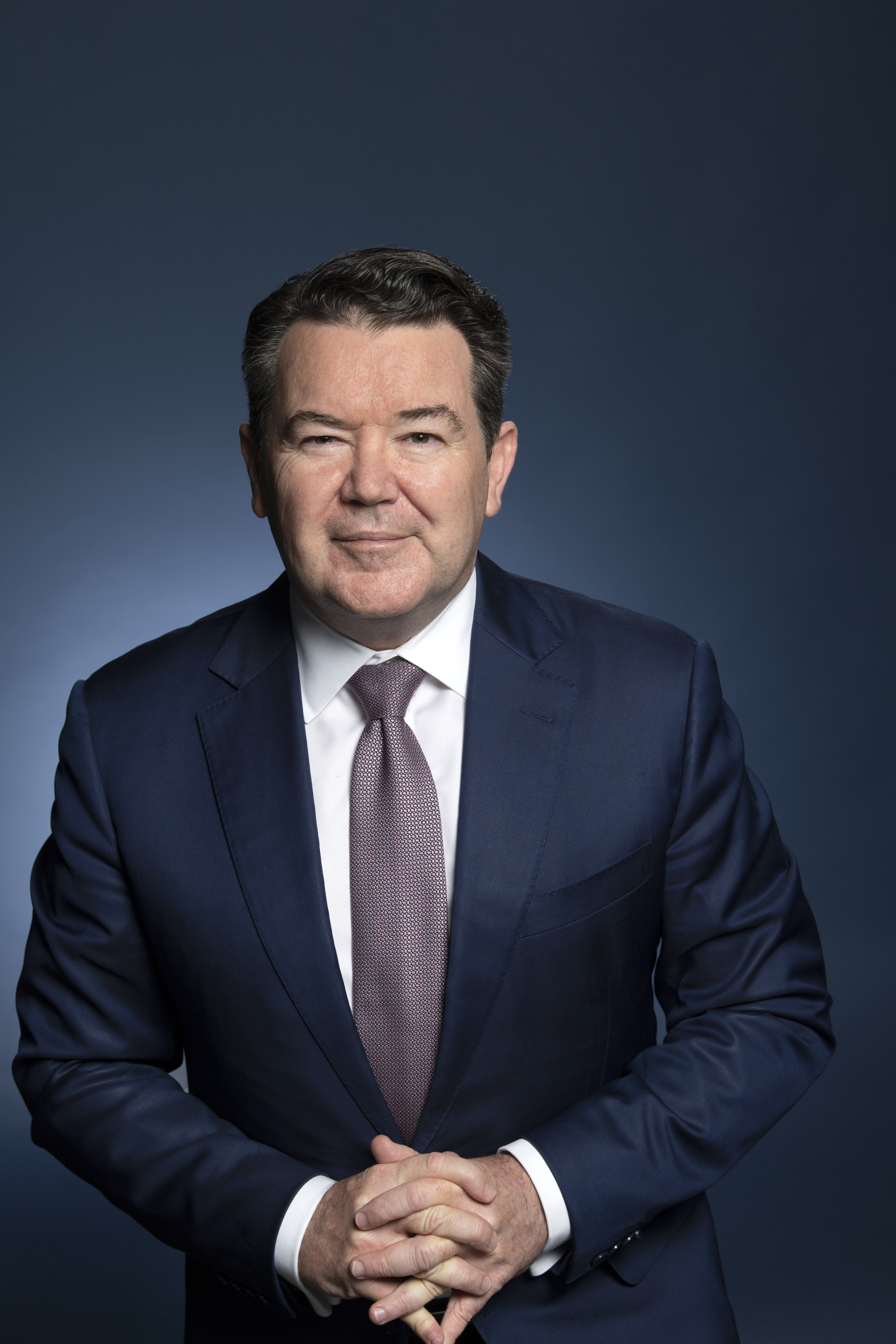
- Smith in 2020

Chief Government Whip in the Senate
- In office 21 January 2019 – 23 May 2022
- Prime Minister: Scott Morrison
- Preceded by: David Bushby
- Succeeded by: Anne Urquhart

Senator for Western Australia
- Incumbent
- Assumed office 2 May 2012
- Preceded by: Judith Adams

Personal details
- Born: Dean Anthony Smith; 15 May 1969 (age 57) Perth, Western Australia, Australia
- Party: Liberal Party of Australia
- Education: University of Western Australia
- Occupation: Politician

Dean Anthony Smith (born 15 May 1969) is an Australian politician and Liberal Party member of the Australian Senate since 2012, representing Western Australia.

== Early life ==
Smith attended Mirrabooka Primary School and Mirrabooka Senior High School, later attending the University of Western Australia where he graduated with honours in political science.

== Politics ==
Smith joined the Liberal Party at the age of 17, and later worked as a policy adviser to Premier of Western Australia Richard Court. In 1998, he was a senior advisor to Prime Minister John Howard during the Coalition's 1998 federal election campaign. In 2010, he founded Smith & Duda Consulting, a political lobbying firm, and also served as treasurer of the Liberal Party state branch in Western Australia.

Smith is factionally unaligned.

=== Senate ===
Smith was appointed to the Senate on 2 May 2012 by a joint sitting of the Parliament of Western Australia, to fill a casual vacancy caused by the death of Senator Judith Adams.

Smith was the first openly-LGBTI member of the Parliament of Australia from the Liberal Party, and has supported same-sex marriage in Australia since the 2014 Sydney hostage crisis. Prior to that, he opposed same-sex marriage and voted against it. Smith introduced the Marriage Amendment (Definition and Religious Freedoms) Bill 2017 to the Senate on 15 November and passed the Senate on 29 November 2017 following the affirmative result of the national postal survey.

Smith was appointed Chief Government Whip in the Senate on 21 January 2019.

He served on the "Inquiry into the destruction of 46,000 year old caves at the Juukan Gorge in the Pilbara region of Western Australia", which delivered its interim report in December 2020. He co-authored additional dissenting comments to the Inquiry's final report with George Christensen MP, arguing against the report's recommendation for new Commonwealth heritage legislation because the "duplication of cultural heritage protection laws at a Federal level is not supported by peak [mining] industry bodies."

Smith is a member of a number of political and community organisations, including Australians for Constitutional Monarchy and the Australian National Flag Association.

== Personal life ==
Smith is the son of a policeman and housewife and is originally from Mirrabooka. He was the first person in his family to attend university. He is an Anglican.
