= Barry O'Sullivan =

Australian politician

Senator for Queensland
- In office 11 February 2014 – 30 June 2019
- Preceded by: Barnaby Joyce
- Succeeded by: Susan McDonald

Personal details
- Born: Barry James O'Sullivan; 24 March 1957 (age 69) Gogango, Queensland, Australia
- Party: LNP (state); National (federal)
- Spouse: Annie Van Lathum (m. 1976; died 2008)
- Domestic partner: Kristina
- Children: 4
- Occupation: Police detective, grazier, property developer

Barry James O'Sullivan (born 24 March 1957) is an Australian politician who was a senator for Queensland from 11 February 2014 until 30 June 2019. He is a member of the Liberal National Party of Queensland (LNP) and sat with the Nationals in federal parliament. A former police detective, grazier, property developer and LNP executive treasurer, O'Sullivan was appointed by the Queensland Parliament to the Senate seat vacated by Barnaby Joyce, who had resigned to contest the House of Representatives seat of New England at the 2013 federal election. He was elected to a three-year term at the 2016 federal election.

== Background and early police career ==
O'Sullivan was educated at St Joseph's Catholic Primary School at Wandal and the Christian Brothers' College, Rockhampton (now The Cathedral College, Rockhampton). Upon leaving school, he was employed as an office boy at the Rockhampton Morning Bulletin and The Longreach Leader newspapers before joining a road construction crew building the Beef Development Road from the Five Ways north of Cloncurry to the Gregory River crossing.

O'Sullivan joined the Queensland Police Service (QPS) in 1976. His career commenced in Brisbane serving in Inala, the City Beat, the Metro Criminal Investigation Bureau (CIB), the Burglary Unit, the Fraud Squad and the Drug Squad.

In 1979 he transferred to the Rockhampton CIB and in 1981 moved to the Moranbah CIB (a one-man detective office) serving the police districts of Nebo, Glenden, Dysart, Moranbah, the eastern end of the Clermont district and the southern end of the Charters Towers District.

O'Sullivan was provided a research grant to attend the United States' FBI Academy to study the profiling of serial offenders.

At the end of the Fitzgerald Inquiry, O'Sullivan was appointed as one of the Queensland "change" agents to implement the recommendations in the Central Police Region, which stretched from Bowen to Gladstone and across to the Northern Territory border. He was appointed acting staff officer to the assistant commissioner in the central region, having the responsibility of supervising the project that restructured the framework of the Queensland Police Service in line with the Fitzgerald recommendations.

In 1990 O'Sullivan worked with the Corrective Services Commission by the Queensland Public Service to facilitate the implementation of the recommendations from the Black Deaths in Custody Royal Commission and the Kennedy Review into Queensland prisons.

Over some fifteen years of police service, O'Sullivan was awarded two imperial honours: the Bronze Medal for Bravery; and the Police Long Service and Good Conduct Medal. O'Sullivan was awarded also the commissioner's Commendation for Bravery, the commissioner's Commendation for Service, and twice obtained the commissioner's Favourable Record.

== Business career ==
Upon retiring from the police force, O'Sullivan established an insurance loss adjuster practice that specialised in the preparation of briefs of evidence in civil litigation cases associated with worldwide catastrophic aviation accidents (principally international flights).

O'Sullivan also established Jilbridge (currently NewLands) – a vertically integrated construction and development business (both civil and structural) based in Toowoomba, which currently employs over 100 staff.

O'Sullivan and his family have operated livestock properties and contracted earthmoving services across leased and owned holdings at Cooyar, Ravensborne and Goondiwindi.

On 6 August 2014, the Sydney Morning Herald reported that O'Sullivan owned 50 properties, making his property portfolio the largest of any parliamentarian in Canberra. The same analysis reports that the average federal politician each owns 2.5 properties.

== LNP treasurer ==
In the lead up to the merger of the Liberal and National Parties, O'Sullivan was asked to assist in overseeing the registration of the new entity, the LNP. He was appointed honorary treasurer. O'Sullivan served in that role during the 2008 merger until his pre-selection to the Senate seat vacated by Barnaby Joyce, who had resigned to contest the House of Representatives seat of New England at the 2013 federal election.

O'Sullivan served on the Candidate Review Committee between 2009 and 2013, going on to be appointed chair of the committee in 2010.

In mid-2012, O'Sullivan was appointed by Queensland public works minister Bruce Flegg to conduct an audit of two state government agencies, GoPrint and GoPlant. The state opposition called the appointment "totally inappropriate", saying that an accounting firm should have conducted the audit rather than an LNP official. Premier Campbell Newman conceded that O'Sullivan's appointment was inappropriate, and that he was not aware of the appointment until it was reported in the media, but stressed that O'Sullivan was not paid for his work.

== Senate ==
On 12 September, the day the appointment was originally planned to take place, Queensland Premier Campbell Newman postponed the debate and vote until 17 October due to O'Sullivan's involvement in an ongoing investigation by the Crime and Misconduct Commission. Newman again postponed the adjournment of parliament to affirm O'Sullivan's Senate appointment until at least February 2014, citing the need to give the CMC time to conclude their investigation. The CMC investigation was to determine whether LNP officials (including O'Sullivan) had offered MP Bruce Flegg inducements to stand aside in the seat of Moggill to make way for Campbell Newman to enter parliament. In December 2013, the commission found no evidence for the allegations.

O'Sullivan was appointed to the Senate by the Queensland Parliament on 11 February 2014.

O'Sullivan is a public opponent of same sex marriage, and was one of twelve senators who voted against the 2017 bill.

In November 2017, when Cory Bernardi moved a motion to ban abortion on sex grounds, O'Sullivan was one of the ten who voted yes on the motion. It was voted down with (10–36). After being criticized for attempting to stop pro-choice groups, the senator on 14 November 2018 stated in Parliament, in order to avoid other politicians making attacks over O'Sullivan's anti-abortion views, that "I'm going to declare my gender today – as I can – to be a woman, and then you'll no longer be able to attack me."

O'Sullivan released a draft bill to enable a royal commission into the banking sector.

In July 2018, O'Sullivan was defeated for LNP preselection by Susan McDonald. McDonald's father is former Nationals party president, Don McDonald.

== Personal life ==
Barry O'Sullivan married Annie Van Lathum of Barcaldine in 1976. The couple had four children. Annie died in 2008. The extended O'Sullivan family now includes seven grand children.

O'Sullivan's grandson, Patrick, made headlines across the nation after he was flung from an amusement park ride while at a school fete just north of Toowoomba in 2013. Patrick fell 10 metres, suffered serious head injuries and was rushed to the Mater Children's Hospital in a critical condition.

According to the Register of Members' Interests, O'Sullivan has a large portfolio of real estate, with stakes in at least 49 investment properties.
