= Kerrynne Liddle =

Australian politician

Senator Kerrynne Liddle
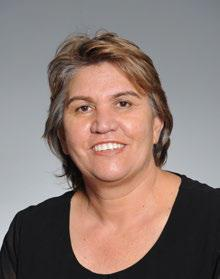
- Liddle c. 2019

Senator for South Australia
- Incumbent
- Assumed office 1 July 2022

Shadow Minister for Indigenous Australians
- In office 28 May 2025 – 17 February 2026
- Preceded by: Jacinta Nampijinpa Price

Personal details
- Born: 7 October 1967 (age 59) Alice Springs, Northern Territory
- Party: Liberal
- Other political affiliations: Labor (2006–2007)
- Education: University of South Australia; University of Adelaide
- Occupation: Journalist; Politician

Kerrynne Liddle (born 7 October 1967) is an Australian politician and the first Indigenous federal member of parliament from South Australia. She is an Arrernte woman and member of the Liberal Party. She was elected to the Senate on the party's ticket in South Australia at the 2022 federal election, to a term beginning on 1 July 2022. She was a journalist and corporate manager before entering politics.

== Early life ==
Liddle was born on 7 October 1967 in Alice Springs. She is one of five children born to Arrernte parents Geoff and Jean Liddle; her father was a construction worker and her mother was a nurse but later worked supporting high school students. Her sister Leanne was the first Indigenous woman to become a police officer in South Australia and her aunt Lorraine Liddle was the first Indigenous person to become a barrister in the Northern Territory.

Liddle attended a public high school in Alice Springs and also studied at Katherine Rural College and later Roseworthy Agricultural College, working as a jillaroo in her early career. As a mature-age student she completed a Bachelor of Arts in management at the University of South Australia and a Master of Business Administration from the University of Adelaide. She completed a Vincent Fairfax Foundation Ethics Fellowship and is a graduate of the Australian Institute of Company Directors.

== Career ==
In her early life, Liddle worked as a journalist with the ABC in radio and television, and Channel 7 Adelaide. She later co-established a public relations consultancy, Precise Media Management, in Adelaide. In 2010, she served on the expert panel for the Review of Australian Government Investment in the Indigenous Broadcasting and Media Sector conducted by Neville Stevens.

In 2011, Liddle was appointed as Santos Limited's Aboriginal participation manager. She later worked for Voyages Indigenous Tourism Australia as people and performance officer at the Ayers Rock Resort.

Liddle served on several boards, including GPEX for GP training and the Central Australian Aboriginal Congress. She also served as chair of the Tandanya National Aboriginal Cultural Institute, on the boards of the South Australian Housing Trust, Aboriginal Hostels Limited and Indigenous Business Australia, and as a member of the councils of the University of Adelaide and University of South Australia.

== Politics ==
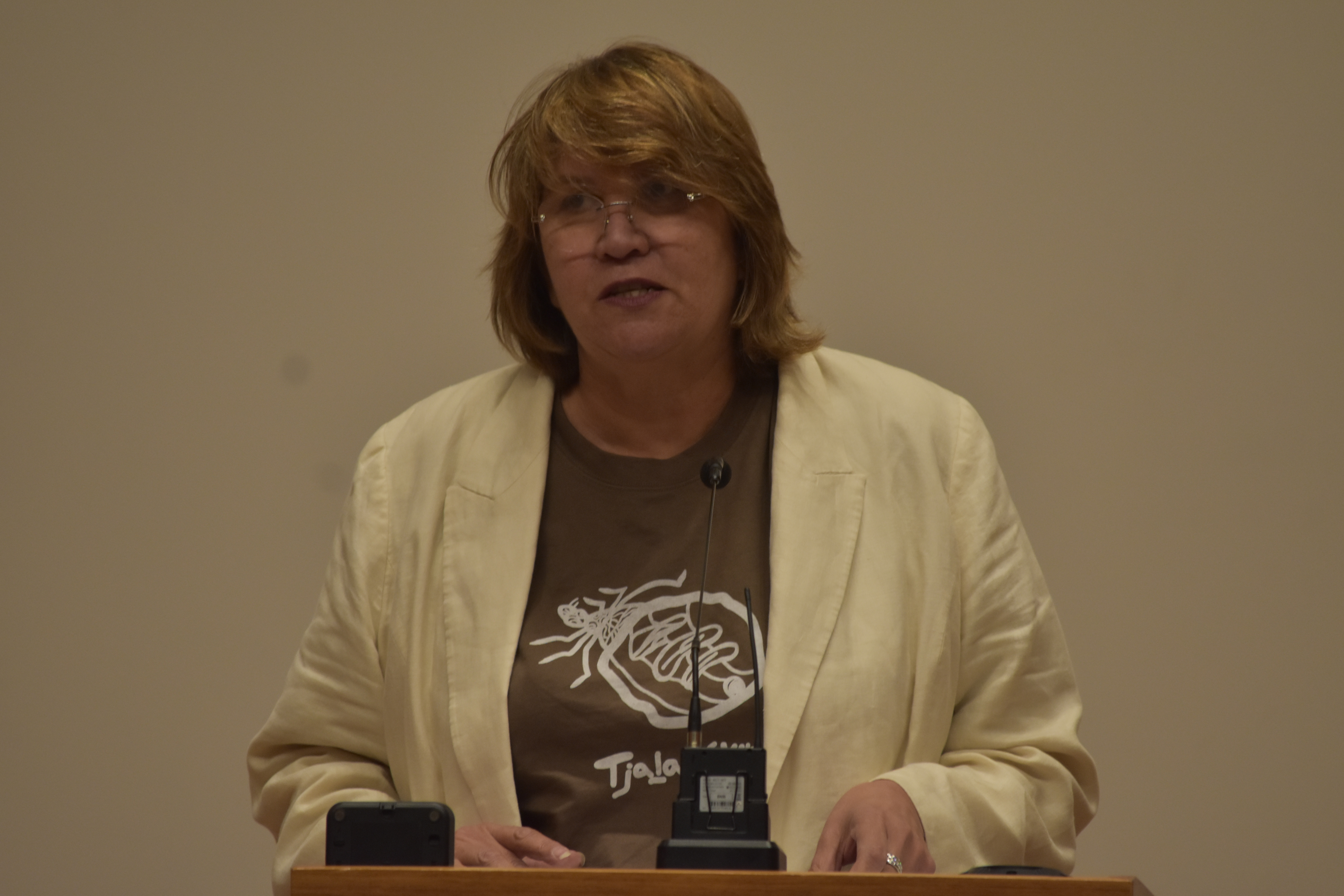
Liddle in 2025 at Trinity College

Liddle became a member of the Australian Labor Party (ALP) in 2006. She later stated in 2021 that she was a financial member for only one year and had only attended one meeting which was an introductory one. She then joined the Liberal Party and was preselected in sixth place on the party's Senate ticket in South Australia at the 2016 federal election. In 2019, Liddle began working as a staffer for Senator Anne Ruston. She was a candidate for the vice-presidency of the Liberal Party's state division in February 2020 but withdrew her candidacy due to illness.

In February 2021, Liddle won preselection for the third position on the Liberal Party's Senate ticket in South Australia at the 2022 election. She was aligned with the party's moderate faction, although her preselection victory over fellow moderate Rachel Swift was largely due to support from the party's conservatives.

At the 2022 federal election, Liddle was elected to a six-year term beginning on 1 July 2022; she was the last South Australian senator to be declared elected. She is the first Indigenous Australian elected to represent South Australia in the Senate and the first Indigenous woman to win a parliamentary seat in South Australia at either state or federal level.

Liddle is a member of the Centrist faction of the Liberal Party.
