= Catryna Bilyk =

Australian politician (born 1959)

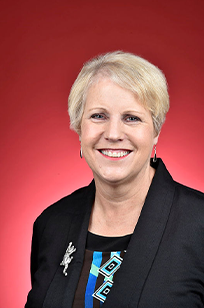

Senator for Tasmania
- In office 1 July 2008 – 30 June 2025
- Succeeded by: Richard Dowling

Personal details
- Born: Catryna Louise Goninon; 7 February 1959 (age 67) Hobart, Tasmania, Australia
- Party: Australian Labor Party
- Website: catrynabilyk.com

Catryna Louise Bilyk (née Goninon; born 7 February 1959) is an Australian politician. She served as a Senator for Tasmania from 2008 to 2025, representing the Australian Labor Party (ALP).

== Early life ==
Bilyk was born in Hobart. She worked as an industrial officer for the Australian Services Union, a researcher for psychiatric pioneer Eric Cunningham Dax, an early childhood educator, and an advisor to Tasmanian Labor Ministers David Crean, Ken Bacon and David Llewellyn. She has also been ALP National Vice-president. She is married with two adult children.

== Senate ==
Bilyk was elected to serve a six-year term in the Senate at the 2007 federal election, after being placed in the third position on the Australian Labor Party's Tasmanian ticket. She was elected to the sixth Senate seat for Tasmania, on preferences distributed from Andrew Wilkie, the Australian Greens' second candidate for the Senate in Tasmania in the 2007 election. It was second time lucky for Bilyk, who had also been preselected in third spot on the Labor Senate ticket in Tasmania at the 2001 federal election, but failed to win a seat.

On 27 February 2016, Bilyk announced that she supports same-sex marriage, having previously opposed it.

== Cancer advocacy ==
In March 2008, as a senator-elect, Bilyk was diagnosed with two benign brain tumours, which were surgically removed. Her experience with brain tumours motivated her to raise funds for research to improve the survival rate for cancer. To date, events she has organised have raised over $120,000 for Cure Brain Cancer Foundation.

On 6 December 2016, Bilyk was appointed chair of a newly-formed Senate Select Committee into funding for research into cancers with low survival rates. The committee has been tasked with inquiring into and reporting on "the impact of health research funding models on the availability of funding for research into cancers with low survival rates."
