= Matt O'Sullivan =

Australian politician (born 1978)

Senator Matt O'Sullivan
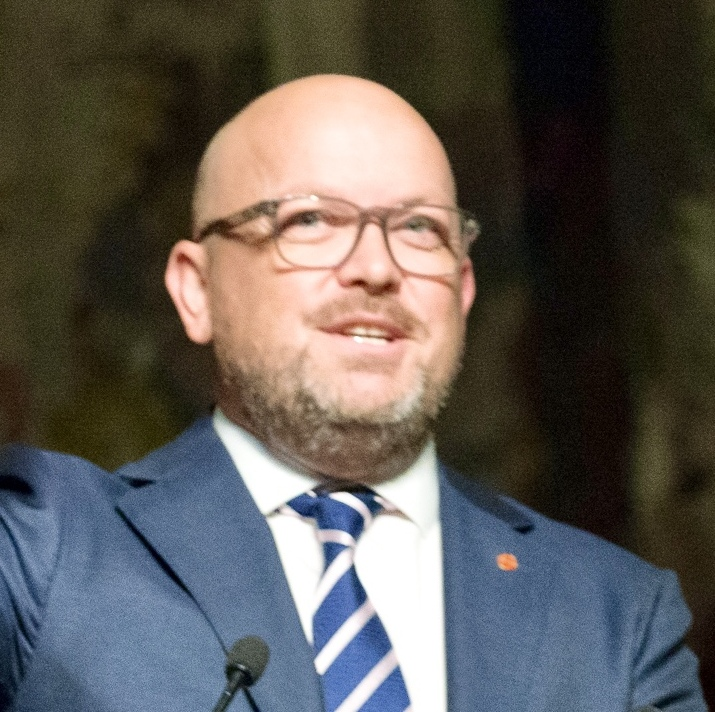

Deputy Manager of Opposition Business in the Senate
- Incumbent
- Assumed office 17 February 2026
- Leader: Angus Taylor
- Preceded by: Paul Scarr

Deputy Government Whip in the Senate
- In office 26 July 2022 – 8 July 2025 Serving with Paul Scarr (2022-24) Maria Kovacic (2024-25)
- Leader: Peter Dutton
- Succeeded by: Jessica Collins

Senator for Western Australia
- Incumbent
- Assumed office 1 July 2019

Personal details
- Born: 11 December 1978 (age 47) Mount Lawley, Western Australia
- Party: Liberal
- Spouse: Montanique O'Sullivan
- Children: 2
- Website: https://senatormattosullivan.com.au/

Matthew Anthony O'Sullivan (born 11 December 1978) is an Australian politician. He has been a Senator for Western Australia since 2019, representing the Liberal Party of Australia.

== Early life ==
O'Sullivan was born on 11 December 1978 in Mount Lawley, Western Australia. He completed a TAFE certificate in electronics and communications at Midland and subsequently worked as an electronic technician with fleet management provider TerraVision from 1996 to 1999. In his maiden speech to parliament he stated that he had installed the passenger information system for the Perth Central Area Transit (CAT) bus network.

O'Sullivan worked as a Christian youth leader from 2000 to 2007, initially with the Perth Christian Life Centre and then with Garden City Christian Church. He was later associated with the evangelical Nations Church. O'Sullivan began working for mining billionaire Andrew Forrest's Minderoo Foundation in 2008, and at the time of his election was chief operating officer of Forrest's indigenous youth employment scheme GenerationOne.

== Politics ==
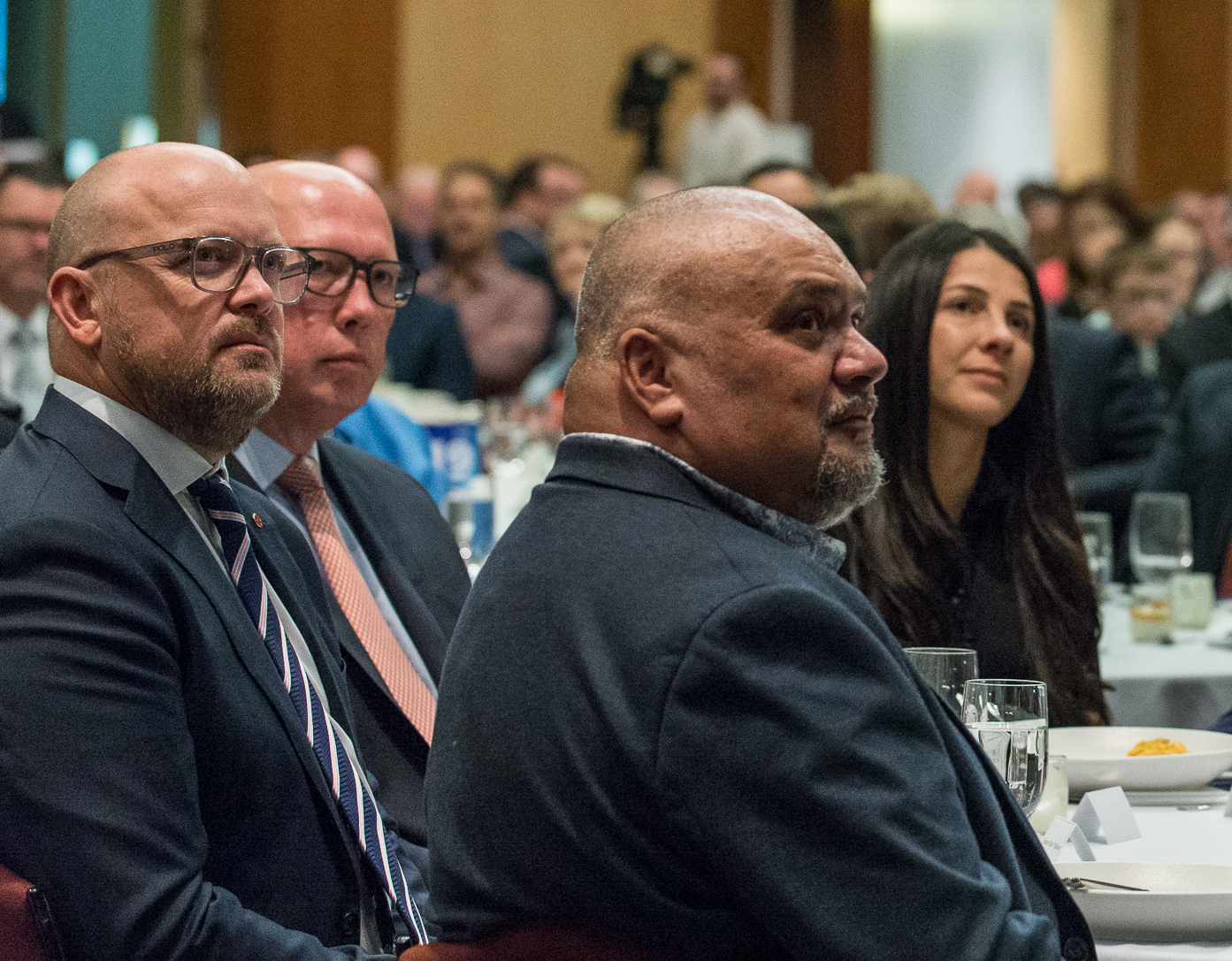
Senator Matt O Sullivan Peter Dutton, Leila Abdallah and indigenous elder Grant Paulson, at the Australian National Prayer Breakfast, held at Parliament House, November 2023.

O'Sullivan was the Liberal Party's candidate in Burt at the 2016 federal election, at which point he was living in Aubin Grove. He won preselection after the original ballot was overturned by the party's state council. He was president of the party's Jandakot branch from 2017 to 2019.

O'Sullivan was elected to the Senate at the 2019 federal election from the marginal third position on the Liberal ticket, after winning a close and contentious Liberal preselection contest. In his first speech to parliament in July 2019, he argued for the extension of the Forrest-backed Cashless Welfare Card across Australia and for a major overhaul of the federal employment services system, including replacing unnecessary Jobactive appointments with online reporting. In October 2019, he claimed at a Senate inquiry into the Robodebt scheme that the label was a "misnomer".

Education and employment have been themes during his time at the Senate, serving on Senate Legislative and General Purpose Standing Committee for Education and Employment, including as its Deputy Chair from mid 2022.

In November 2019, he became a member of a new cross-party parliamentary working group into indigenous constitutional recognition and a "voice to government". He is known to be supportive of regional Voice models.

Along with Labor Party MP, David Smith, O'Sullivan is a convener Parliamentary Christian Fellowship. Politically, he has been described as part of the National Right grouping in the Liberal Party.

== Personal life ==
O'Sullivan and his wife Montanique live in the southern suburbs of Perth, where they raise their two children Amy and Samuel.
