= Anne Urquhart =

Australian politician (born 1957)

Anne Urquhart MP

Member of the Australian Parliament for Braddon
- Incumbent
- Assumed office 3 May 2025
- Preceded by: Gavin Pearce

Senator for Tasmania
- In office 1 July 2011 – 28 March 2025
- Preceded by: Kerry O'Brien
- Succeeded by: Josh Dolega

Personal details
- Born: Anne Elizabeth Polden; 18 October 1957 (age 68) Latrobe, Tasmania, Australia
- Party: Australian Labor Party
- Occupation: Union official
- Website: anneurquhart.com.au

Anne Elizabeth Urquhart (née Polden; born 18 October 1957) is an Australian politician. She is a member of the Australian Labor Party (ALP) and has been a member of the House of Representatives since 2025, representing the seat of Braddon. She previously served as a Senator for Tasmania from 2011 to 2025. She was a senior official with the Australian Manufacturing Workers' Union (AMWU) prior to entering politics.

== Early life ==
Urquhart was born in Latrobe, Tasmania, the second of three children born to Tom and Betty Polden. After starting a family with her husband Graham, in July 1980 she began working as a process worker at the Edgell-Birds Eye factory in Ulverstone, which was later taken over by Simplot Australia.

Urquhart joined the Food Preservers' Union of Australia, initially serving as a delegate and then from August 1990 as a full-time organiser. Her union was later merged into the Australian Manufacturing Workers' Union (AMWU), and she served as state president from 1998 to 2004 and state secretary from 2004 to 2010.

== Politics ==
Urquhart served as a vice-president of the Australian Labor Party (Tasmanian Branch) from 2004 and as a delegate to the ALP National Conference. She was first elected to the Senate at the 2010 federal election, to a term beginning on 1 July 2011. She was re-elected to further six-year terms in 2016 (following a double dissolution) and 2022. Her office is located in Devonport.

In 2014 Urquhart was elected state president of the ALP, replacing Rebecca White. She has served on a variety of committees during her time in the Senate. She has been the Labor Party's chief whip in the Senate since 2016, having previously served as a deputy whip from 2013 to 2016. After the ALP's victory at the 2022 election she became chief government whip and was also made chair of the selection of bills committee.

Anthony Albanese announced in November 2024 that Urquhart would be the Labor Party's candidate for the federal Division of Braddon at the 2025 federal election, requiring her to resign her Senate seat on 28 March 2025. She won the seat for the Labor Party with a double digit swing to become an MP.

Parliament of Australia
Preceded by Gavin Pearce	Member for Braddon; 2025–present	Incumbent
