= Leah Blyth =

Australian politician

Senator Leah Blyth

Senator for South Australia
- Incumbent
- Assumed office 6 February 2025
- Preceded by: Simon Birmingham

Shadow Assistant Minister for Defence Infrastructure
- Incumbent
- Assumed office 17 February 2026
- Preceded by: Phillip Thompson (as Shadow Assistant Minister for Defence)

Shadow Assistant Minister for Stronger Families and Stronger Communities
- In office 28 May 2025 – 17 February 2026
- Preceded by: Position established
- Succeeded by: Position abolished

President of the South Australian Liberal Party
- In office 23 August 2024 – 19 September 2026
- Preceded by: Rowan Mumford
- Succeeded by: Alex Antic

Personal details
- Party: Liberal
- Children: 3
- Occupation: Politician, Education Executive

Leah Blyth is an Australian politician. She is a Senator for South Australia representing the Liberal Party. She was appointed to the Senate via a joint sitting of the Parliament of South Australia on 6 February 2025, to replace retiring Senator Simon Birmingham. She will serve the remainder of Birmingham's term which will expire in 2028.

Blyth was preselected for her Senate appointment on 31 January 2025, backed by right-wing party factional powerbroker and fellow Senator Alex Antic. Without her successful preselection, she would have been a candidate for the federal election later that year, placing in an unwinnable fourth position on the Liberal Party senate ticket for South Australia.

Less than four months after entering federal parliament, Blyth was appointed as Shadow Assistant Minister for Stronger Families and Stronger Communities in the Ley shadow ministry in May 2025.

Prior to entering federal parliament, Blyth has been the President of the South Australian Liberal Party since August 2024. She is an education executive and was a former Liberal Women's Council president. She is married with three children.

Blyth is a member of the Conservative faction of the Liberal Party.
