= 2010 Australian Senate election =

2010 Australian Senate elections
- 21 August 2010

40 of the 76 seats in the Australian Senate 39 seats needed for a majority
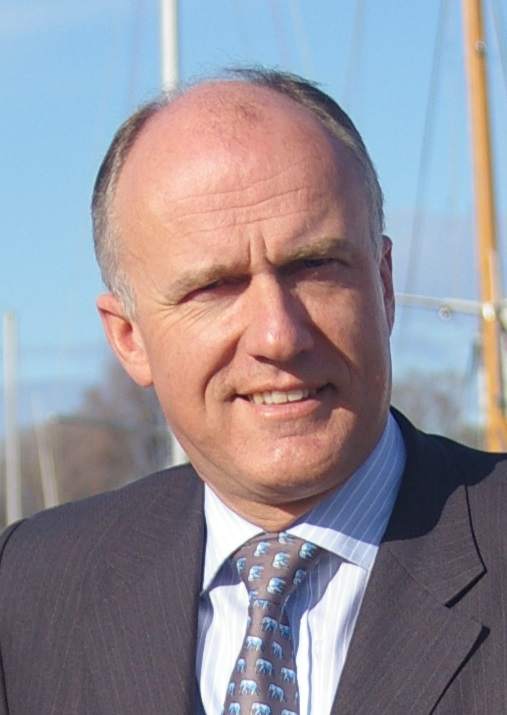

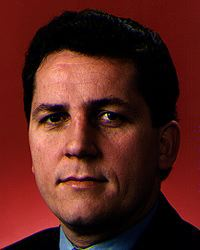

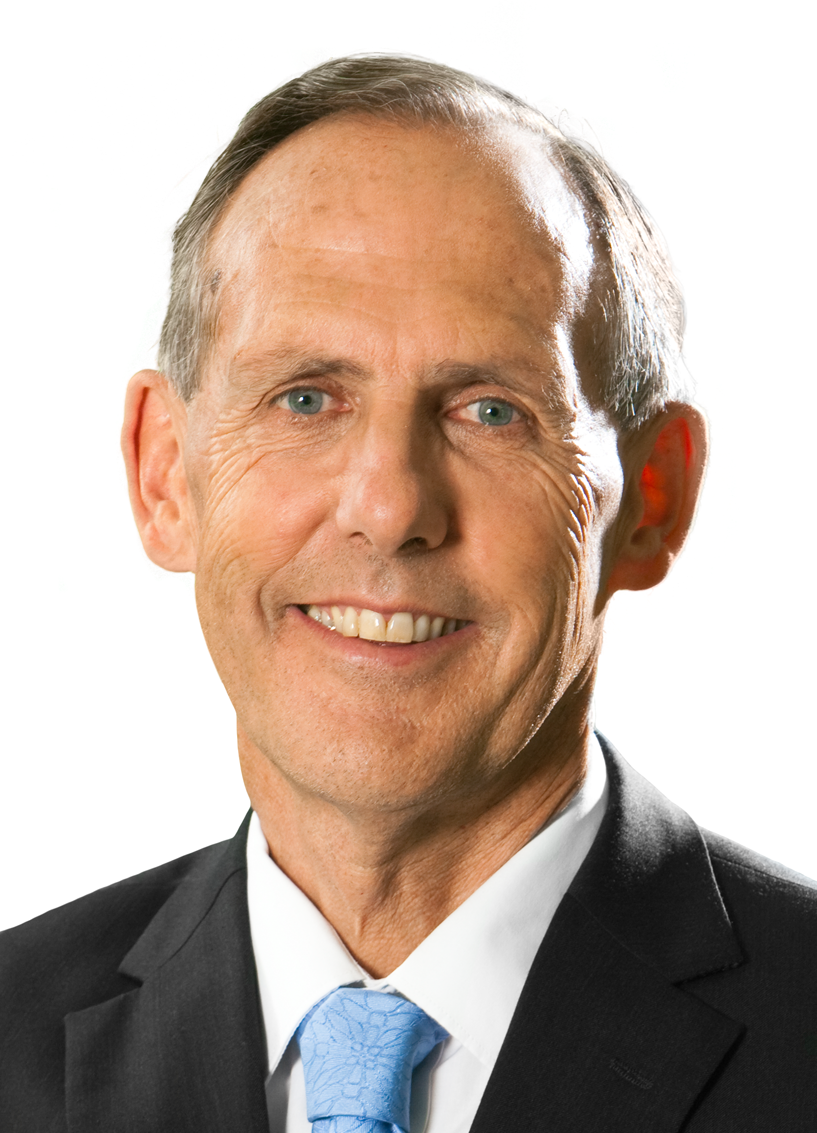

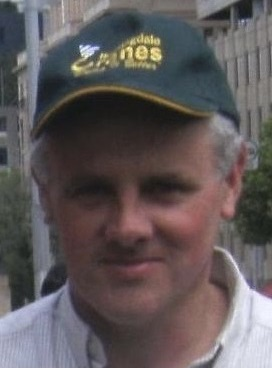
	First party	Second party
Leader	Eric Abetz	Chris Evans
Party	Liberal–National Coalition	Labor
Leader since	3 May 2010	22 October 2004
Leader's seat	Tasmania	Western Australia
Seats before	37	32
Seats won	18	15
Seats after	34	31
Seat change	▼3	▼1
Popular vote	4,871,871	4,469,734
Percentage	38.30%	35.13%
Swing	▼1.47%	▼5.17%
	Third party	Fourth party
Leader	Bob Brown	John Madigan
Party	Greens	Democratic Labour
Leader since	28 November 2005
Leader's seat	Tasmania	Victoria (won seat)
Seats before	5	0
Seats won	6	1
Seats after	9	1
Seat change	▲4	▲1
Popular vote	1,667,315	134,987
Percentage	13.11%	1.06%
Swing	▲4.07%	▲0.14%
- Senators elected in the 2010 federal election
Leader of the Senate before election
Chris Evans
Labor
Elected Leader of the Senate
Chris Evans
Labor

The following tables show state-by-state results in the Australian Senate at the 2010 federal election. Senators total 34 Coalition, 31 Labor, nine Green, one Democratic Labor Party, and one independent, Nick Xenophon. New Senators took their places from 1 July 2011.

As of 2025, this is the latest senate election where the three major party senate leaders were male.

== Quota ==
Senate Quota in each State are as follows

Quota	Vote	Remarks
1	14.3%	
2	28.6%	
3	42.9%	Equality
4	57.1%	Majority
5	71.4%	
6	85.7%	

Senate Quota in each Territory are as follows

Quota	Vote	Remarks
1	33.4%	Equality
2	66.7%	Majority

== Australia ==
Senate (STV GV) — Turnout 93.82% (CV) — Informal 3.75%
Party	Votes	%	Swing	Seats won	Total seats	Change
Liberal/National joint ticket (Note: The Liberal and National parties ran a joint ticket in New South Wales and Victoria. It includes the Liberal National Party in Queensland.)	3,740,002	29.40	−1.28	8	17	▼2
Liberal (Note: The Liberals-only ticket ran in Western Australia, South Australia, Tasmania and the Australian Capital Territory.)	1,092,601	8.59	−0.18	9	16	▼1
Country Liberal (NT)	39,268	0.31	−0.01	1	1	Steady
Coalition total	4,871,871	38.30	–1.47	18	34	▼3
Labor	4,469,734	35.13	–5.17	15	31	▼1
Greens	1,667,315	13.11	+4.07	6	9	▲4
Family First	267,493	2.10	+0.48	0	0	▼1
Sex Party	259,583	2.04	+2.04			
Liberal Democrats	230,191	1.81	+1.68			
Shooters and Fishers	214,119	1.68	+1.38			
Democratic Labor	134,987	1.06	+0.14	1	1	▲1
Christian Democrats	127,894	1.01	+0.07			
Democrats	80,645	0.63	–0.66			
One Nation	70,672	0.56	+0.14			
Fishing and Lifestyle	48,547	0.38	+0.18			
National (WA) (Note: The National Party of Western Australia prior to and subsequent to the election were not in the federal Coalition agreement. Nationals WA MP Tony Crook stated that he was a crossbencher, and has said: "In every news report and press report we see, my number is being allocated in with the Coalition and it shouldn't be". Thus, the party has been counted separately from the Coalition totals.)	42,334	0.33	+0.19			
Socialist Alliance	32,580	0.26	+0.18			
Carers Alliance	28,578	0.22	+0.03			
The Climate Sceptics	25,758	0.20	+0.20			
Senator On-Line	17,441	0.14	+0.08			
Building Australia	17,241	0.14	+0.14			
Socialist Equality	13,945	0.11	+0.07			
Citizens Electoral Council	13,243	0.10	+0.03			
Secular	11,981	0.09	+0.09			
Australia First	9,680	0.08	+0.08			
Communist Alliance	6,999	0.06	+0.06			
Non-Custodial Parents	3,616	0.03	–0.02			
Independents	55,786	0.44	–0.94	0	1 (Note: The independenant senator was Nick Xenophon (South Australia).)	Steady
Total	12,722,233			40	76	
Invalid/blank votes		495,160	3.75	+1.20		
Registered voters/turnout		14,086,869	93.83			
Source: Commonwealth Election 2010

== New South Wales ==
2010 Australian federal election: Senate, New South Wales
Party	Candidate	Votes	%	±%
Quota		593,218		
Liberal/National Coalition	1. Concetta Fierravanti-Wells (Lib) (elected 1); 2. Bill Heffernan (Lib) (elected 3); 3. Fiona Nash (Nat) (elected 5); 4. Hollie Hughes (Lib); 5. Joe Dennis (Nat); 6. George Bilic (Nat)	1,617,418	38.95	−0.38
Labor	1. John Faulkner (elected 2); 2. Matt Thistlethwaite (elected 4); 3. Steve Hutchins; 4. Anne Murnain; 5. Fiona Seaton; 6. Hugh McDermott	1,517,382	36.54	−5.53
Greens	1. Lee Rhiannon (elected 6); 2. Keith McIlroy; 3. Brami Jagatheeswaran; 4. Harriett Swift; 5. Simone Morrissey; 6. Dominic Kanak	443,913	10.69	+2.26
Shooters and Fishers	1. Jim Muirhead; 2. Alistair McGlashan	96,638	2.33	+2.33
Liberal Democrats	1. Glenn Druery; 2. Lucy Gabb; 3. Peter Stitt	95,752	2.31	+2.12
Christian Democrats	1. Paul Green; 2. Robyn Peebles; 3. Elaine Nile	80,376	1.94	−0.03
Sex Party	1. Marianne Leishman; 2. Huw Campbell; 3. Larissa Zimmerman	73,553	1.77	+1.77
Family First	1. Greg Swane; 2. Phil Lamb	39,123	0.94	+0.34
Democratic Labor	1. Simon McCaffrey; 2. Martin Cullen	30,939	0.75	−0.51
Democrats	1. Fiona Clancy; 2. Jen Mitchell	28,398	0.68	−0.21
One Nation	1. Andrew Webber; 2. John Brett	23,456	0.56	+0.15
Socialist Alliance	1. Rachel Evans; 2. Soubhi Iskander	23,392	0.56	+0.48
Carers Alliance	1. Marylou Carter; 2. Maree Buckwalter	11,496	0.28	−0.06
Building Australia	1. Ray Brown; 2. Michael O'Donnell	10,815	0.26	+0.26
Climate Sceptics	1. Bill Koutalianos; 2. Geoffrey Brown	8,737	0.21	+0.21
Group AE	1. Cheryl Kernot; 2. Simon Cant	7,965	0.19	+0.19
Communist Alliance	1. Geoff Lawler; 2. Brenda Kellaway	6,999	0.17	+0.17
Citizens Electoral Council	1. Robert Butler; 2. Ian McCaffrey	5,771	0.14	+0.09
Secular	1. Ian Bryce; 2. Lyle Warren	3,970	0.10	+0.10
Socialist Equality	1. Nick Beams; 2. Gabriela Zabala	3,708	0.09	+0.04
Non-Custodial Parents	1. Andy Thompson; 2. Roland Foster	3,616	0.09	+0.03
Senator On-Line	1. Wes Bas; 2. Brianna Roach	2,974	0.07	+0.02
Reconcile Australia	1. Jennifer Stefanac; 2. Tucky Cooley	2,301	0.06	+0.06
Republican Democrats	1. Michael Eckford; 2. Criselee Stevens	2,029	0.05	+0.05
Protectionist	1. Darrin Hodges; 2. Nick Folkes	1,864	0.04	+0.04
Stable Population	1. William Bourke; 2. Mark O'Connor	1,701	0.04	+0.04
Group B	1. Robert Hodges; 2. Bob Frier	1,521	0.04	+0.04
Group L	1. Leon Belgrave; 2. Janos Beregszaszi	1,475	0.04	+0.04
Group C	1. Tony Robinson; 2. Noel Selby	1,035	0.02	+0.02
Group H	1. Nadia Bloom; 2. Bede Ireland	1,011	0.02	+0.02
Group K	1. Meg Sampson; 2. June Hinchcliffe	947	0.02	+0.02
Group R	1. David Barker; 2. S. G. Zureik	773	0.02	+0.02
Independent	Hamish Richardson	769	0.02	+0.02
Independent	Andrew Whalan	353	0.01	+0.01
Independent	Bryan Pape	242	0.01	+0.01
Independent	Stewart Scott-Irving	73	0.00	+0.00
Independent	Norman Hooper	39	0.00	+0.00
Total formal votes		4,152,524	95.83	−1.93
Informal votes		180,743	4.17	+1.93
Turnout		4,333,267	93.98	−1.42

Elected	#	Senator	Party
2010	1	Concetta Fierravanti-Wells	Liberal
2010	2	John Faulkner	Labor
2010	3	Bill Heffernan	Liberal
2010	4	Matt Thistlethwaite	Labor
2010	5	Fiona Nash	National
2010	6	Lee Rhiannon	Greens
2007
2007	1	Mark Arbib	Labor
2007	2	Helen Coonan	Liberal
2007	3	Doug Cameron	Labor
2007	4	John Williams	National
2007	5	Marise Payne	Liberal
2007	6	Ursula Stephens	Labor

Primary votes saw the Coalition and the Labor Party win two seats each before preferences were counted, with the Greens ahead of the Coalition for the fifth seat. Preferences from the Family First Party, the Christian Democrats and the Shooters and Fishers saw the Coalition reach the quota first, leading to Fiona Nash winning the fifth seat, while Coalition and Sex Party preferences saw the Liberal Democrats threatening the Greens for the sixth and final seat, but Labor preferences saw the Greens reach the quota. The end result was three seats Coalition, two seats Labor, and one seat Green.

== Victoria ==
2010 Australian federal election: Senate, Victoria
Party	Candidate	Votes	%	±%
Quota		459,822		
Labor	1. Kim Carr (elected 1); 2. Stephen Conroy (elected 4); 3. Antony Thow; 4. Marg Lewis; 5. Shelly Freeman	1,215,213	37.75	−3.95
Liberal/National Coalition	1. Michael Ronaldson (Lib) (elected 2); 2. Bridget McKenzie (Nat) (elected 5); 3. Julian McGauran (Lib); 4. Susan Jennison (Lib)	1,107,522	34.41	−5.09
Greens	1. Richard Di Natale (elected 3); 2. Janet Rice; 3. Nam Bui; 4. Jen Hargrave; 5. Julie Rivendell; 6. Liezl Shnookal	471,317	14.64	+4.56
Family First	1. Steve Fielding; 2. Gary Plumridge; 3. Ann Bown Seeley; 4. Yuli Goh; 5. Joyce Khoo	85,058	2.64	+0.12
Democratic Labor	1. John Madigan (elected 6); 2. Geraldine Gonsalvez; 3. John Kavanagh	75,145	2.33	+1.30
Sex Party	1. Fiona Patten; 2. Emma Wilson; 3. Katie Blakey	72,899	2.26	+2.26
Liberal Democrats	1. Ross Currie; 2. Graeme Klass	59,116	1.84	+1.74
Shooters and Fishers	1. Peter Kelly; 2. Alex Krstic	44,639	1.39	+0.72
Democrats	1. Roger Howe; 2. Rick Westgarth	15,858	0.49	−1.16
Christian Democrats	1. Vickie Janson; 2. Ben Eddy-Veitz	12,330	0.38	+0.16
One Nation	1. Rosalyn Townsend; 2. Philip Townsend	12,094	0.38	−0.04
Socialist Equality	1. Patrick O'Connor; 2. Keo Vongvixay	10,237	0.32	+0.24
	1. Stephen Mayne; 2. Paula Piccinini	6,021	0.19	+0.19
Carers Alliance	1. Christopher Monteagle; 2. Wendy Peacock	5,425	0.17	+0.05
Climate Sceptics	1. Chris Dawson; 2. Lee Holmes	4,908	0.15	+0.15
Building Australia	1. Darren Evans; 2. Sam White	4,898	0.15	+0.15
	1. Joseph Toscano; 2. Jenny Warfe; 3. Andrew Sadauskas	3,906	0.12	+0.12
Secular	1. John Perkins; 2. Rosemary Sceats	3,480	0.11	+0.11
Socialist Alliance	1. Margarita Windisch; 2. Sharon Firebrace; 3. Ron Guy	3,075	0.10	+0.02
Senator On-Line	1. Glenn Sargent; 2. Emma Wardle	2,394	0.07	−0.03
Citizens Electoral Council	1. Doug Mitchell; 2. Katherine Isherwood	2,332	0.07	+0.02
Independent	Grant Beale	615	0.02	+0.02
Independent	Glenn Shea	269	0.01	+0.01
Total formal votes		3,218,751	96.06	−0.66
Informal votes		131,919	3.94	+0.66
Turnout		3,350,670	94.07	−1.53

Elected	#	Senator	Party
2010	1	Kim Carr	Labor
2010	2	Michael Ronaldson	Liberal
2010	3	Richard Di Natale	Greens
2010	4	Stephen Conroy	Labor
2010	5	Bridget McKenzie	National
2010	6	John Madigan	DLP
2007
2007	1	Jacinta Collins	Labor
2007	2	Mitch Fifield	Liberal
2007	3	Gavin Marshall	Labor
2007	4	Helen Kroger	Liberal
2007	5	Scott Ryan	Liberal
2007	6	David Feeney	Labor

The primary vote saw the Coalition win two seats, Labor win two seats and the Greens win one seat, leaving Labor leading for the final seat with a comfortable majority ahead of the Coalition, Family First, DLP and Australian Sex Party. It ended up being a tight race for the final senate seat in Victoria, with preferences from One Nation and the Christian Democrats saw the DLP move ahead of Family First into third place, but Australian Democrat and Liberal Democrat preferences saw the DLP getting overtaken by the Sex Party. However, the Sex Party was overtaken once again by the DLP's Family First preferences, and Sex Party preferences saw the DLP move into second place ahead of the Coalition, whose preferences allowed the DLP to overtake Labor to secure the sixth seat. The final results were two seats Coalition, two seats Labor, one seat Green and one seat Democratic Labor.

== Queensland ==
2010 Australian federal election: Senate, Queensland
Party	Candidate	Votes	%	±%
Quota		350,074		
Liberal National	1. George Brandis (elected 1); 2. Barnaby Joyce (elected 3); 3. Brett Mason (elected 6); 4. Russell Trood; 5. Julie Boyd	1,015,062	41.42	+1.02
Labor	1. Joe Ludwig (elected 2); 2. Jan McLucas (elected 4); 3. David Smith; 4. Shannon Fentiman	720,182	29.39	−9.81
Greens	1. Larissa Waters (elected 5); 2. Elizabeth Connors; 3. Jenny Stirling	312,804	12.76	+5.44
Family First	1. Wendy Francis; 2. Peter Findlay; 3. Amanda Nickson	83,786	3.42	+1.22
Sex Party	1. Desiree Gibson; 2. Tim Sheen	63,586	2.59	+2.59
Liberal Democrats	1. Jim Fryar; 2. Robert Fulton	55,222	2.25	+2.09
Fishing and Lifestyle	1. Keith Douglas; 2. Michael Mansfield	48,547	1.98	+1.19
Shooters and Fishers	1. Andrew Peter; 2. Chris Huggett	42,669	1.74	+1.21
One Nation	1. Rod Evans; 2. Ian Nelson	22,353	0.91	+0.74
Democrats	1. Paul Stevenson; 2. Jennifer Cluse	19,019	0.78	−1.10
Democratic Labor	1. Tony Zegenhagen; 2. Angelique Barr; 3. Noel Jackson	11,186	0.46	+0.16
Christian Democrats	1. Malcolm Brice; 2. Tony Vogel	10,449	0.43	+0.17
Australia First	1. Peter Schuback; 2. Nick Maine	9,680	0.40	+0.40
Senator On-Line	1. Scott Reading; 2. Joh Embrey	8,908	0.36	+0.31
Carers Alliance	1. Anne Vetter; 2. Vicki Horne	6,758	0.28	+0.08
Climate Sceptics	1. Terence Cardwell; 2. Lance Jones	4,665	0.19	+0.19
Socialist Alliance	1. Sam Watson; 2. David Lowe	3,806	0.16	+0.08
Citizens Electoral Council	1. Robert Thies; 2. Maurice Hetherington	3,021	0.12	+0.07
	1. Russell Wattie; 2. John Dowell	2,314	0.09	+0.09
Secular	1. Kat Alberts; 2. Peter Shelton	1,997	0.08	+0.08
	1. Paul Spencer; 2. Mary Spencer	1,163	0.05	+0.05
	1. E-Jay Lindsay-Park; 2. Lachlan Guerin	1,031	0.04	+0.04
Independent	Mark White	863	0.04	+0.04
	1. John Pyke; 2. Christopher Tooley	765	0.03	+0.03
Independent	Maurie Carroll	221	0.01	+0.01
Republican Democrats	Peter Pyke	176	0.01	+0.01
Independent	Don Bambrick	125	0.01	+0.01
Independent	Mark Smith	86	0.00	+0.00
Independent	Jarrod Wirth	67	0.00	+0.00
Total formal votes		2,450,511	96.50	−1.16
Informal votes		88,761	3.50	+1.16
Turnout		2,539,272	93.38	−1.43

Elected	#	Senator	Party
2010	1	George Brandis	LNP
2010	2	Joe Ludwig	Labor
2010	3	Barnaby Joyce	LNP
2010	4	Jan McLucas	Labor
2010	5	Larissa Waters	Greens
2010	6	Brett Mason	LNP
2007
2007	1	Ian Macdonald	Liberal
2007	2	John Hogg	Labor
2007	3	Sue Boyce	Liberal
2007	4	Claire Moore	Labor
2007	5	Ron Boswell	National
2007	6	Mark Furner	Labor

Primary votes saw the LNP and Labor both winning two seats, with the LNP and Greens having a sizable majority against Family First and the Sex Party for the final two seats. Labor and Australian Democrat preferences saw the Greens reaching the quota, while preferences from the Shooters and Fishers, One Nation, Liberal Democrats, Family First and Sex Party all saw the Australian Fishing and Lifestyle Party make a large gain on the Liberal National Party. However, the gain was not enough and the LNP ended up winning the final seat. The final result was three seats LNP, two seats Labor and one seat Green.

== Western Australia ==
2010 Australian federal election: Senate, Western Australia
Party	Candidate	Votes	%	±%
Quota		176,318		
Liberal	1. Mathias Cormann (elected 1); 2. Chris Back (elected 3); 3. Judith Adams (elected 5); 4. Jane Mouritz; 5. Jonathan Huston	530,583	42.99	−3.23
Labor	1. Chris Evans (elected 2); 2. Glenn Sterle (elected 4); 3. Wendy Perdon; 4. Peter MacFarlane	366,580	29.70	−6.30
Greens	1. Rachel Siewert (elected 6); 2. Kado Muir; 3. Christine Cunningham	172,327	13.96	+4.66
National	1. John McCourt; 2. Ronnie Fleay; 3. Michael Rose	42,334	3.43	+1.99
Sex Party	1. Justine Martin; 2. Mark Coleman	27,795	2.25	+2.25
Christian Democrats	1. Trevor Young; 2. Lachlan Dunjey	22,206	1.80	+0.04
Liberal Democrats	1. Mark Walmsley; 2. Mark Dixon	14,517	1.18	+1.13
Family First	1. Linda Rose; 2. Steve Fuhrmann	14,254	1.15	+0.29
Democratic Labor	1. Elaine McNeill; 2. Joe Nardizzi	9,346	0.76	−0.19
One Nation	1. Craig Bradshaw; 2. Bill Cook	7,610	0.62	−0.35
Shooters and Fishers	1. Paul Peake; 2. Christine Peake	7,459	0.60	+0.60
Democrats	1. Paul Young; 2. Matthew Corica	4,730	0.38	−0.67
	1. Anthony Fels; 2. Felly Chandra	3,447	0.28	+0.28
Climate Sceptics	1. Beau Woods; 2. Heather Dewar	2,010	0.16	+0.16
Carers Alliance	1. Julie Gilmore; 2. Aileen Polain	1,641	0.13	+0.00
WA First	1. Scott Cowans; 2. John Goodlad; 3. James Versteegen	1,464	0.12	+0.12
Socialist Alliance	1. Ben Peterson; 2. Julie Gray	1,268	0.10	+0.02
Citizens Electoral Council	1. Judy Sudholz; 2. Stuart Smith	1,231	0.10	+0.02
Secular	1. Guy Curtis; 2. Andrew Thompson	1,007	0.08	+0.08
	1. Paddy Embry; 2. Juanita Finnegan	988	0.08	+0.08
Ecology, Social Justice, Aboriginal	1. Gerry Georgatos; 2. Bill Hayward; 3. Marianne Mackay; 4. Lara Menkens	552	0.04	+0.04
Senator On-Line	1. Daniel Mayer; 2. Keturah Hoffman	504	0.04	−0.03
Independent	Rosemary Steineck	366	0.03	+0.03
Total formal votes		1,234,219	96.82	−0.76
Informal votes		40,490	3.18	+0.76
Turnout		1,274,709	93.55	−0.31

Elected	#	Senator	Party
2010	1	Mathias Cormann	Liberal
2010	2	Chris Evans	Labor
2010	3	Chris Back	Liberal
2010	4	Glenn Sterle	Labor
2010	5	Judith Adams	Liberal
2010	6	Rachel Siewert	Greens
2007
2007	1	David Johnston	Liberal
2007	2	Louise Pratt	Labor
2007	3	Alan Eggleston	Liberal
2007	4	Mark Bishop	Labor
2007	5	Michaelia Cash	Liberal
2007	6	Scott Ludlam	Greens

The primary vote saw the Liberals winning three seats and Labor winning two, leaving the Greens with a very comfortable majority against the Nationals and the Sex Party. Socialist Alliance and Labor preferences saw the Greens easily reach the quota.

== South Australia ==
2010 Australian federal election: Senate, South Australia
Party	Candidate	Votes	%	±%
Quota		144,226		
Labor	1. Alex Gallacher (elected 1); 2. Anne McEwen (elected 3); 3. Dana Wortley	386,577	38.29	+2.67
Liberal	1. Mary Jo Fisher (elected 2); 2. Sean Edwards (elected 4); 3. David Fawcett (elected 6); 4. Peter Salu	376,532	37.30	+2.02
Greens	1. Penny Wright (elected 5); 2. Sandy Montgomery; 3. Jeremy Miller	134,287	13.30	+6.81
Family First	1. Bob Day; 2. Andrew Cole; 3. Thea Hennessey	41,227	4.08	+1.19
Sex Party	1. Ari Reid; 2. Jason Virgo	16,820	1.67	+1.67
Shooters and Fishers	1. Steve Larsson; 2. Robert Borsak	11,425	1.13	+0.74
Democrats	1. Jeanie Walker; 2. Andrew Castrique	6,975	0.69	−0.19
Democratic Labor	1. Paul Russell; 2. David McCabe	6,811	0.67	−0.26
Liberal Democrats	1. Nick Kerry; 2. Megan Clark	5,584	0.55	+0.47
One Nation	1. Robert Edmonds; 2. Peter Fitzpatrick	5,159	0.51	−0.10
Climate Sceptics	1. Leon Ashby; 2. Nathan Ashby	4,672	0.46	+0.46
Carers Alliance	1. Gary Connor; 2. Angela Groves	3,258	0.32	+0.32
Christian Democrats	1. Joseph Stephen; 2. Frank Revink	2,533	0.25	+0.10
	1. Mark Aldridge; 2. Christopher Cochrane	2,186	0.22	+0.22
Building Australia	1. Bill Adams; 2. Neil Jackson	1,528	0.15	+0.15
Senator On-Line	1. Simon Lang; 2. Jamie Dawson	1,173	0.12	+0.06
Socialist Alliance	1. Renfrey Clarke; 2. Ruth Ratcliffe	1,039	0.10	+0.02
Secular	1. Scott Sharrad; 2. Moira Clarke	953	0.09	+0.09
Independent	Michelle Drummond	839	0.08	+0.08
Total formal votes		1,009,578	96.88	−0.74
Informal votes		32,493	3.12	+0.74
Turnout		1,042,071	94.33	−1.50

Elected	#	Senator	Party
2010	1	Alex Gallacher	Labor
2010	2	Mary Jo Fisher	Liberal
2010	3	Anne McEwen	Labor
2010	4	Sean Edwards	Liberal
2010	5	Penny Wright	Greens
2010	6	David Fawcett	Liberal
2007
2007	1	Don Farrell	Labor
2007	2	Cory Bernardi	Liberal
2007	3	Nick Xenophon	Independent
2007	4	Penny Wong	Labor
2007	5	Simon Birmingham	Liberal
2007	6	Sarah Hanson-Young	Greens

Primary votes saw both the Liberals and Labor winning two seats each, leaving the Greens leading while Labor was narrowly ahead of the Liberals. Sex Party preferences saw the Greens reach the quota to secure the fifth seat, while Family First preferences saw the Liberals overtake Labor to secure the sixth vacancy. The final result was three seats Liberal, two seats Labor and one seat Green.

== Tasmania ==
2010 Australian federal election: Senate, Tasmania
Party	Candidate	Votes	%	±%
Quota		47,242		
Labor	1. Helen Polley (elected 1); 2. Anne Urquhart (elected 4); 3. Lisa Singh (elected 6)	136,908	41.40	+1.30
Liberal	1. Eric Abetz (elected 2); 2. Stephen Parry (elected 5); 3. Guy Barnett	109,023	32.97	−4.42
Greens	1. Christine Milne (elected 3); 2. Peter Whish-Wilson; 3. Penelope Ann	67,016	20.27	+2.14
Shooters and Fishers	1. Ray Williams; 2. Jeff Blackmore	6,649	2.01	+2.01
Family First	1. Jim Zubic; 2. Hamish Woodcock	4,045	1.22	−0.82
Democrats	1. Paulene Hutton; 2. Timothy Neal	1,608	0.49	+0.49
Democratic Labor	1. Mishka Gora; 2. Margaret Williams	1,560	0.47	−0.16
Senator On-Line	1. Julie Murray; 2. Sven Wiener	1,488	0.45	+0.45
Independent	Dino Ottavi	1,054	0.32	+0.32
Climate Sceptics	1. Frank Waller; 2. Sally Costella	766	0.23	+0.23
Secular	1. Jeff Keogh; 2. Jin-oh Choi	574	0.17	+0.17
Total formal votes		330,691	96.77	−0.60
Informal votes		11,047	3.23	+0.60
Turnout		341,738	95.30	−0.68

Elected	#	Senator	Party
2010	1	Helen Polley	Labor
2010	2	Eric Abetz	Liberal
2010	3	Christine Milne	Greens
2010	4	Anne Urquhart	Labor
2010	5	Stephen Parry	Liberal
2010	6	Lisa Singh	Labor
2007
2007	1	Nick Sherry	Labor
2007	2	Richard Colbeck	Liberal
2007	3	Bob Brown	Greens
2007	4	Carol Brown	Labor
2007	5	David Bushby	Liberal
2007	6	Catryna Bilyk	Labor

Primary votes saw the Liberals and Labor both win two seats and the Greens win one, which left Labor ahead of the Greens and the Liberals. It is possible that Liberal preferences may have pushed the Greens ahead of Labor, which would've led to them taking the final seat, but Shooters and Fishers preferences meant that the Liberals ended up ahead of the Greens, and Labor ended up taking the seat with Green preferences. The final result was three seats Labor, two seats Liberal and one seat Green.

== Territories ==
=== Australian Capital Territory ===
2010 Australian federal election: Senate, Australian Capital Territory
Party	Candidate	Votes	%	±%
Quota		76,425		
Labor	1. Kate Lundy (elected 1); 2. David Mathews	93,639	40.84	+0.00
Liberal	1. Gary Humphries (elected 2); 2. Matthew Watts	76,463	33.35	−0.85
Greens	1. Lin Hatfield Dodds; 2. Hannah Parris	52,546	22.92	+1.46
Democrats	1. Darren Churchill; 2. Anthony David	4,057	1.77	−0.07
Independent	John Glynn	2,567	1.12	+1.12
Total formal votes		229,272	97.45	−0.85
Informal votes		5,999	2.55	+0.85
Turnout		235,271	94.89	−1.11

Elected	#	Senator	Party
2010	1	Kate Lundy	Labor
2010	2	Gary Humphries	Liberal

Labor Senator Kate Lundy was re-elected with well over a quota. Liberal Senator Gary Humphries was also re-elected, with just over (1.01x) a quota. Although the Greens received significantly more votes than in 2007, the two ACT Senators were elected on quotas, leaving no room for preference flows.

=== Northern Territory ===
2010 Australian federal election: Senate, Northern Territory
Party	Candidate	Votes	%	±%
Quota		32,230		
Country Liberal	1. Nigel Scullion (elected 1); 2. Rhianna Harker	39,268	40.61	+0.58
Labor	1. Trish Crossin (elected 2); 2. Matthew Gardiner	33,253	34.39	−12.55
Greens	1. Warren H. Williams; 2. Debbie Hudson	13,105	13.55	+4.73
Sex Party	1. Seranna Shutt; 2. Shana Leitens	4,930	5.10	+5.10
Shooters and Fishers	1. Phillip Hoare; 2. Matt Graham	4,640	4.80	+4.80
Citizens Electoral Council	1. Vernon Work; 2. Graham Setterberg	888	0.92	−1.09
Independent	Ian Lee	314	0.32	+0.32
Democrats	Duncan Dean	170	0.18	+0.18
First Nations	Liam Flenady	119	0.12	+0.12
Total formal votes		96,687	96.31	−1.75
Informal votes		3,708	3.69	+1.75
Turnout		100,395	82.93	−3.95

Elected	#	Senator	Party
2010	1	Nigel Scullion	CLP
2010	2	Trish Crossin	Labor

Country Liberals Senator Nigel Scullion, who is also deputy leader of the National Party of Australia, was re-elected with well over a quota of votes. Labor Senator Trish Crossin was also re-elected, with just over (1.04x) a quota of votes. Although the Greens received the next highest number of votes, the two NT Senators were elected on quotas, leaving no room for preference flows.

== See also ==
- Results of the 2010 Australian federal election (House of Representatives)
- Post-election pendulum for the 2010 Australian federal election
- Members of the Australian Senate, 2011–2014
