= Alliance for Progress (Australia) =

- Abbreviation: AFP; AfP; Alliance
- Founder: James Jansson
- Founded: 2015; 11 years ago
- Dissolved: 2017; 9 years ago
- Split from: Minor Party Alliance
- Membership (2016): 14,000 (combined)
- Ideology: Progressivism
- Political position: Left-wing

Website
- allianceforprogress.org.au

The Alliance for Progress (AFP), also known simply as the Alliance, was an alliance of small Australian political parties. It was composed of nine parties with progressive ideologies as part of an effort to work together on campaigns, share resources, and negotiate preference recommendations.

== History ==
The 2013 federal election resulted in a number of minor parties being elected to the Senate, after the Minor Party Alliance (MPA) organised and negotiated preference flows through the group voting ticket (GVT) system. The MPA was organised by Glenn Druery and included both progressive and non-progressive political parties, with those elected in 2013 including the Australian Motoring Enthusiast Party, Family First Party, and the Liberal Democratic Party.

In 2015, a number of parties that had worked with Druery split from the MPA to form the Alliance for Progress, in time for the Canning by-election. Two members of the newly-formed Alliance − the Animal Justice Party and the Pirate Party − as well as the Sustainable Population Party, which was participating in Alliance meetings, contested the by-election.

The Alliance for Progress was critical of changes to the Senate electoral system, which included the removal of GVTs, and instead favoured the introduction of optional preferential voting below-the-line. The removal of GVTs was supported by the Greens, and the Alliance for Progress chose to contest Greens-targeted seats at the 2016 federal election in response.

== Members ==
=== Official members ===
Nine parties were official members of the Alliance for Progress.

Party		Registered	Ideology
AJP	Animal Justice Party	Yes	Animal protection, animal rights
ART	Arts Party	Yes	Humanism, environmentalism
AEP	Australian Equality Party	Yes	LGBTQ rights
AP	Australian Progressives	Yes	Progressivism
LESTp	Life Extension, Science and Technology Party	No	Pro-life extension
PPA	Pirate Party Australia	Yes	Pirate politics
SCI	Science Party (Note: The Science Party was known as the Future Party until 24 March 2016.)	Yes	Bright green environmentalism
SPA	Secular Party of Australia	Yes	Secular humanism, secular liberalism
TPAU	Transhumanist Party Australia	No	Transhumanism

=== Affiliated members ===
Eleven parties attended Alliance for Progress meetings, but were not officially members.

Party		Registered	Ideology
ACP	Australian Cyclists Party	Yes	Cycling issues
SEX	Australian Sex Party	Yes	Sex positivity, civil libertarianism
BAP	Building Australia Party	Yes	Building industry rights
BTFA	Bullet Train for Australia	Yes	High-speed rail advocacy
HEMP	Help End Marijuana Prohibition (HEMP) Party	Yes	Cannabis legalisation
FLUX	Flux	Yes	Issue-based direct democracy
ODD	Online Direct Democracy	Yes	Electronic direct democracy
REP	Renewable Energy Party	Yes	Green politics
SAP	Sustainable Australia Party (Note: The Sustainable Australia Party was known as the Sustainable Population Party from 28 February 2014 until 18 January 2016.)	Yes	Environmentalism, sustainable development
TLC	The Labour Coalition	No	Labourism
VEP	Voluntary Euthanasia Party	Yes	Voluntary euthanasia reform advocacy
