= Ricky Muir =

Australian politician (born 1980)

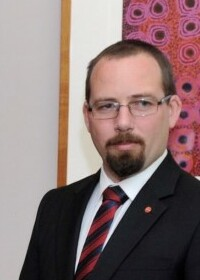
- Muir in July 2014

Senator for Victoria
- In office 1 July 2014 – 2 July 2016
- Preceded by: Helen Kroger
- Succeeded by: Derryn Hinch

Personal details
- Born: Ricky Lee Muir; 25 December 1980 (age 45) Maffra, Victoria, Australia
- Party: Shooters, Fishers, Farmers (from 2017); Independent (2016–2017); Motoring Enthusiast (2013–2016)
- Spouse: Kerrie-Anne Muir
- Children: 5
- Education: Maffra Secondary College; Boisdale Consolidated School
- Occupation: Forestry mill owner; Forestry officer; Automotive aftermarket component producer
- Profession: Business owner; politician

Ricky Lee Muir (born 25 December 1980) is an Australian politician who served as a Senator for Victoria from 2014 to 2016.

Muir was elected to the Senate at the 2013 federal election, standing for the Australian Motoring Enthusiast Party (AMEP). His election from a primary vote of just 0.51%, along with several similar occurrences, contributed to the abolition of group voting tickets in 2016. In October 2013, Muir announced that he would form a voting bloc in the Senate with the Palmer United Party's members. His term formally began on 1 July 2014. He failed to win re-election at the 2016 election, following a double dissolution which cut short his term in office. He joined the Shooters, Fishers and Farmers Party in 2017, standing unsuccessfully in the seat of Morwell at the 2018 Victorian state election. He was his party's lead Senate candidate in Victoria at the 2019 federal election.

== Early life ==
Muir was born in Maffra, Victoria. He grew up mainly in Stratford, completing most of his primary education at Boisdale Consolidated School with a short stint at Dargo, then later attending secondary school at Maffra Secondary College, leaving school in 1996.

He worked for a leather company making car seats. Around 2009, he moved to Denison, near Heyfield, and worked for a sawmill, moving up to manager. Shortly before the election, the sawmill ceased operations and he lost his job.

== Political career ==
=== Entry to politics ===
Muir said that as a young man, he was interested in customising cars, but as he gained a family, he moved on to four-wheel drives as a way to explore the countryside. He wanted to keep the country open for four-wheel drives to explore. About four months before the election, he discovered the AMEP on social networking sites. He was preselected for the election without having met the party leaders. He had no political experience. He calls himself an "average Australian" and wanted to make "balanced decision which reflects on hopefully the everyday Australian".

=== 2013 election ===
Muir represented AMEP in Victoria at the 2013 federal election and won on a record-low primary vote of 0.51 percent or 17,122 first preferences (coming 13th out of 34 groups), getting to the 14.3 percent quota from 23 group voting ticket party preferences: Bank Reform Party, Australian Fishing and Lifestyle Party, HEMP Party, Shooters and Fishers, Australian Stable Population Party, Senator Online, Building Australia Party, Family First Party, Bullet Train For Australia, Rise Up Australia Party, No Carbon Tax Climate Sceptics, Citizens Electoral Council, Palmer United Party, Democratic Labour Party, Katter's Australian Party, Socialist Equality Party, Australian Sex Party, Australian Voice Party, Wikileaks Party, Drug Law Reform, Stop CSG, Animal Justice Party, and the Australian Independents Party. The previous record for the lowest successful primary Senate vote for a party's lead candidate was held by the Nuclear Disarmament Party's Robert Wood who polled 1.5 percent in New South Wales in 1987, a double dissolution election. Independent Senator Nick Xenophon and larger parties including the incoming government are examining changes to the group voting ticket system.

In October 2013 it was reported that the AMEP's Victorian State Council had been banned by the party's executive from contacting Muir since the election, and that Muir supported the executive's decision to suspend the State Council. The Victorian branch of the party voted to disband itself and expel Muir in July 2014. Both the expulsion and the existence of the Victorian branch after October 2013 were not recognised by the federal party.

On 10 October 2013 Muir announced he would enter into an alliance with the Palmer United Party.

=== Senator ===
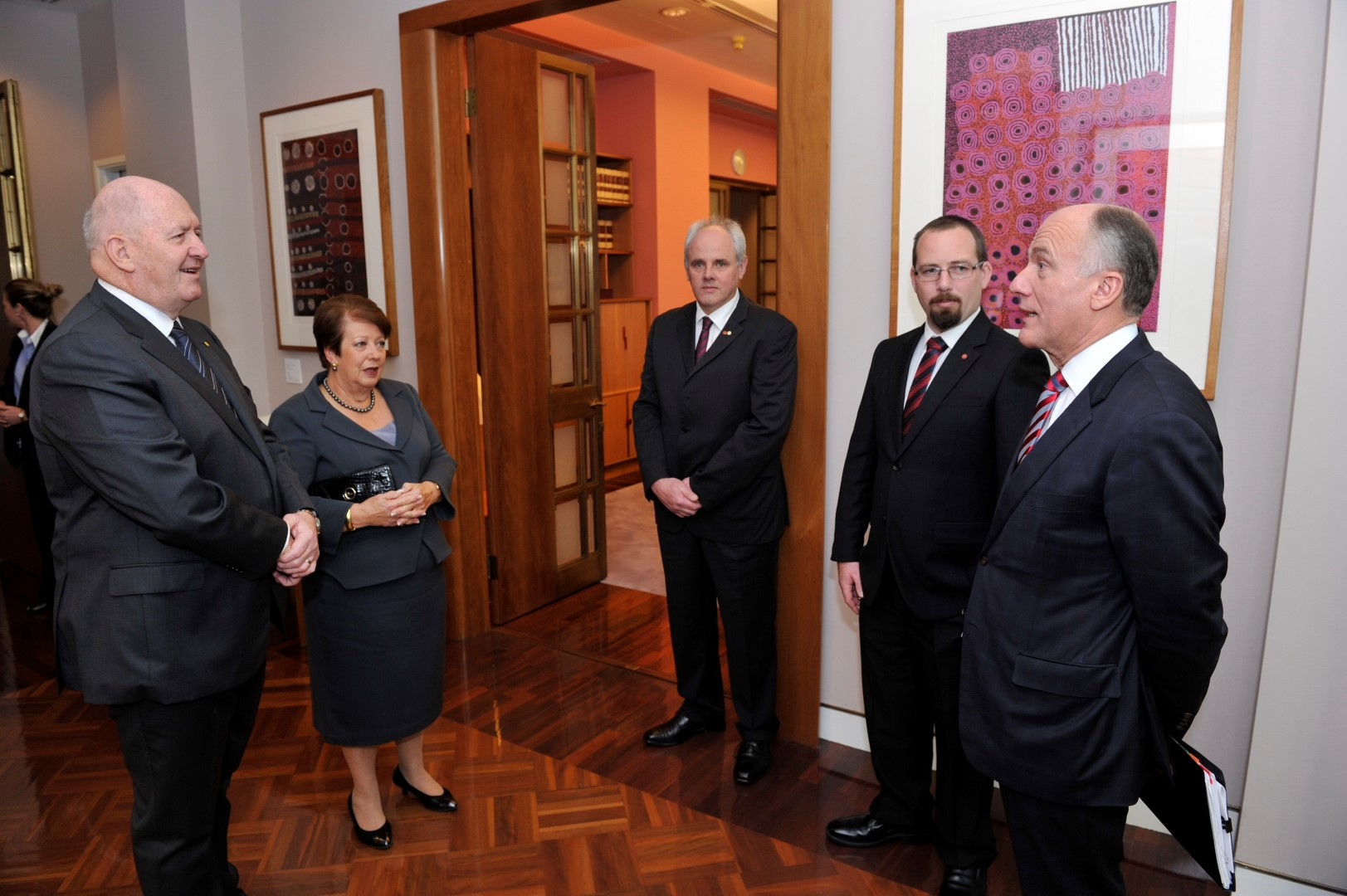
Muir (second from right) with Governor-General Sir Peter Cosgrove, Lady Cosgrove, and other Senators in 2014

Muir's term in the senate commenced on 1 July 2014. He delivered his maiden speech on 5 March 2015.

In an interview by Mike Willesee broadcast on Channel Seven's Sunday Night program on 8 June 2014, Muir was shown to have considerable difficulty explaining the meaning of the terms "balance of power" and "aftermarket". In response, Clive Palmer asserted that Willesee was a "dickhead" and had a "plum stuck up his arse". Palmer claimed that only a minute of an hour long interview was put to air.

Muir's senior adviser was electoral consultant Glenn Druery, however he was sacked by Muir less than a month later and was escorted out of Parliament. Muir stated that Druery did not "get along with the staff". Muir also hired former New South Wales state politician Peter Breen to advise him on legislation, but also sacked him on 6 August 2014. As of November 2014, five members of Muir's staff had resigned or been sacked.

On 19 November 2014, Muir voted against changes to financial planning laws on which the Abbott government and Palmer United Party had reached agreement.

=== SFF candidate ===
Muir joined the Shooters, Fishers and Farmers Party (SFF) in June 2017. He contested the electoral district of Morwell at the 2018 Victorian state election, coming fifth with 7.1% of the vote.

Muir was the SFF lead candidate for the Senate in Victoria at the 2019 federal election. The party received 1.9% of the vote.

He contested the electoral district of Gippsland East at the 2022 Victorian state election, coming fourth with 5.83% of the vote.

== Family life ==
He is married to Kerrie-Anne Muir and they have five children.
