= Family First Party =

Political party in Australia (2002–2017)

- Founded: 2002; 24 years ago
- Dissolved: 26 April 2017; 9 years ago
- Merged into: Conservatives
- Succeeded by: Family First (2021)
- Headquarters: 77 Fullarton Road, Kent Town, South Australia
- Ideology: Social conservatism
- Political position: Right-wing to far-right
- Religion: Christianity (Assemblies of God)
- Colours: Blue and orange

The Family First Party was a conservative political party in Australia which existed from 2002 to 2017. It was founded in South Australia where it enjoyed its greatest electoral support. Since the demise of the Australian Conservatives into which it merged, it has been refounded in that state as the Family First Party (2021).

Family First had three candidates elected to the Senate during its existence—Steve Fielding (2005–2011), Bob Day (2014–2016), and Lucy Gichuhi (2017; elected on a countback following Day being declared ineligible). At state level, the party won a seat in the South Australian Legislative Council across four consecutive state elections (2002, 2006, 2010, and 2014). It also briefly had representatives in the New South Wales Legislative Council and Western Australian Legislative Council, as a result of defections from other parties.

The party was generally considered to be part of the Christian right. Though it had no formal affiliation with any particular religious organisation, Family First was strongly linked to the Pentecostal church in South Australia, and nationally from smaller Christian denominations. Family First in South Australia was viewed as an infusion of ex-Liberals via Robert Brokenshire and Day. Originally advocating a moral and family values agenda, Day, who would become Family First's major donor, later reoriented Family First to begin to emphasise issues such as industrial relations reform, free speech and smaller government, which brought Family First closer to Cory Bernardi's Australian Conservatives. Family First and its two state parliamentarians Dennis Hood and Brokenshire joined and merged with Bernardi's Australian Conservatives on 25 April 2017.

Newly appointed Family First senator Lucy Gichuhi did not join the Conservatives, and became an independent senator when Family First was disbanded. Gichuhi was invited to join the Australian Conservatives' voting bloc in the Senate, but ultimately chose to join the Liberal Party. Brokenshire was not re-elected at the 2018 state election, and Hood left the Conservatives to join the Liberal Party on 26 March 2018.

== History ==
The party was founded 2002 in South Australia, in time to contest the 2002 state election, when former Assemblies of God pastor Andrew Evans became its first elected member, winning a seat in the South Australian Legislative Council. A second party member, pharmaceutical executive Dennis Hood, was elected to the Legislative Council at the 2006 state election. Robert Brokenshire replaced Evans following the latter's retirement in 2008.

At the 2004 federal election, Family First contested seats all over Australia, generally exchanging preferences with Liberal candidates, although in some seats it exchanged preferences with the Australian Labor Party. In Queensland, the party refused to direct preferences to Liberal candidate Ingrid Tall on the grounds she was openly gay, also refusing to preference Liberal candidate Warren Entsch for his support for same-sex marriage. At that election, Steve Fielding was elected as a senator for Victoria for the party. Fielding, along with independent Nick Xenophon and the five Australian Greens, shared the balance of power in the Senate from July 2008 to July 2011. He lost his seat at the 2010 federal election.

In June 2008, sitting MP and former Liberal Party member, Dan Sullivan, joined the Western Australian state branch of Family First as an executive member. When three former One Nation MPs attended the public launch of the branch, it fuelled media speculation that they might try to influence the West Australian branch.

During the 2009/10 financial year, party chairman Bob Day made two loans totalling $405,000 to Family First. After gaining 4% of the vote in several House of Representatives seats in the 2010 federal election, the party also received around $400,000 in Commonwealth election funding.

Family First returned to the Australian Senate at the 2013 federal election, when Day was elected as a senator for South Australia. He was re-elected at the 2016 double dissolution federal election. A few months later, his family-owned building company, Home Australia Group, ran into financial difficulties and was wound up. Day announced immediately that he would resign from the senate as a consequence, however he did not resign immediately, allowing time for the party to develop a process for selecting a replacement. He resigned on 1 November 2016 creating a vacancy in the senate. In April 2017 the high court ruled that he was invalidly elected in July 2016 and had been ineligible to sit in the senate since February 2016.

The vacancy created by Day's resignation was filled by another Family First senate candidate, Lucy Gichuhi. Gichuhi was declared by the court of disputed returns on 13 April 2017 to be elected instead of Day, after a special recount of South Australian senate votes. She became Australia's first African Senator.

=== Merger with the Australian Conservatives ===
On 26 April 2017, a merger between the Australian Conservatives and the Family First Party was announced, with Family First to be absorbed into the Conservatives. Newly appointed Family First senator Lucy Gichuhi did not join the Conservatives, and became an independent senator when the Family First Party was disbanded. The party formally relinquished its registration with the Australian Electoral Commission on 30 August 2017.

Psephologist Antony Green suggested the merger could in part be attributed to the abolition of group voting tickets, which makes it more difficult for like-minded parties to swap preferences without a certain amount of "leakage" to other parties.

According to John Macaulay, an executive of the Australian Conservatives Board, and the dissolution document of Family First, the Party did not merge with the Australian Conservatives. The Family First executive voted to dissolve the party, and in accordance with Australian law, they donated all their assets to the Australian Conservative Party.

== Religious affiliation ==
Although officially eschewing religious labels, many of its candidates and members were from conservative Christian backgrounds. Family First co-founder Pastor Andrew Evans was the General Superintendent of the Assemblies of God in Australia for twenty years. In the 2002 South Australian election and the 2004 federal election, a number of Family First candidates were church members. In New South Wales, 11 of their 23 candidates for the 2004 federal election were from an Assemblies of God church, the Hawkesbury Church in Windsor.

South Australian Family First Member of the Legislative Council Dennis Hood, the party's state parliamentary leader, is a member of the Rostrevor Baptist Church. When Sunday Mail columnist Peter Goers stated that Hood was an anti-evolution Creationist, Hood did not deny this in his response, while he did attempt to set the record straight on issues of policy.

Family First's preferencing agreement with the Coalition in the 2004 federal election led Barnaby Joyce, the National senate candidate for Queensland, to publicly slam the party the day before the election, calling them "the lunatic Right", and stating that "these are not the sort of people you do preference deals with". Joyce's comments came in response to a pamphlet published by one of the party's Victorian Senate candidates, Danny Nalliah who in his capacity as a church pastor had criticised other religions and homosexuality.

In September 2004, party leader Andrea Mason said that Family First is not a Christian party and Family First Federal Secretary Dr Matt Burnet issued a press release stating:

The party is not a church party or an Assembly of God party, nor is it funded by AOG churches. It does see itself as socially conservative, with Family Values based on Christian ethics. Like any mainstream party we do not have on record the religious affiliations of any of our members. The Board of Reference in South Australia includes business-people, members of the medical profession, as well as ministers and people from Catholic, Baptist, Lutheran, Uniting and other church groups. The rapid national growth of the party leading into this election and the late decision to contest in all seats possible, has meant that in some states there are candidates, with strong family values, who have been introduced to the party through the personal relationships they have from their involvement in community/church networks.

A 60-minute documentary was made for the ABC-TV Compass program in 2005 and called "Family First – A Federal Crusade". It was produced by Dr Bruce Redman from The University of Queensland.

By August 2010, the party maintained its non-denominational stance and affirmed its affinity towards Christianity in stating "Family First in 2010 is independent of any church or denomination...like so many other Australian institutions, at Family First our Christian heritage is something we are both proud of and grateful for."

=== Church and state ===
Church and State (CAS) is a conservative non-denominational Christian "political education ministry" founded in 2016 by David Pellowe, who was a candidate for FFA in the 2015 Queensland state election and 2016 Australian federal election, but since 2016 has no affiliation to the party.

== Elections and results ==
=== Federal elections ===
==== 2004 federal election ====
The party agreed to share House of Representatives preferences with the Liberal–National Coalition at the 2004 election (with some exceptions discussed below).

Family First picked up 1.76% of the vote nationally. Steve Fielding, the lead candidate in Victoria, was successful in picking up the last Senate seat. Although he received a primary vote of only 1.88% (56,376 votes), he achieved the 14.3% quota required by a run of preferences including those from the Australian Labor Party. The typically apolitical psephologist Malcolm Mackerras stated "The outlandish result occurred in Victoria in 2004 where the Family First party was able to gather tickets from just about everywhere... this is a fluke. And I’ve always referred to Senator Steve Fielding as the Fluke Senator".

The party also came close to picking up other Senate seats in Tasmania (largely due to preferences from surplus Liberal votes) and in South Australia where the then party leader Andrea Mason narrowly missed out (polling 3.98% and receiving Liberal preferences).

==== 2007 federal election ====
Family First contested the 2007 federal election, in particular seeking to increase its Senate representation. Nationwide, the party received 1.62% of the primary vote in the Senate, and 1.99% in the House of Representatives, both down slightly on the 2004 result. In Victoria, however, both the lower and upper house vote increased by 0.64%, to 2.52 and 3.02% respectively. No Family First candidates were elected. Sitting senator Steve Fielding's term did not expire until 2011.

Before the 2007 federal election, Fred Nile criticised Family First for giving preferences (in some states) to the Liberty and Democracy Party, a libertarian political party one of whose policies was to legalize recreational drug use, stating "They gave their preferences to the enemy, the anti-Christian party." This was suggested as a reason for their poor election result. Fred Nile's own Christian Democratic Party had also preferenced the Liberty and Democracy Party before any other major party in the Senate.

In 2008, some newspapers claimed that Fielding wanted to "relaunch himself as a mainstream political player, beyond Family First's ultra-conservative evangelical Christian support base." The reports indicated that Fielding had tried to recruit Tim Costello and others around the beginning of 2008 with a view to forming a new party, but had failed to convince them. The revelations came after Fielding changed his position on abortion, after being rebuffed by his party for taking a softer approach. Fielding denied the claims.

==== 2010 federal election ====
At the 2010 federal election, Family First contested the Senate in all states, but were not successful, with the national vote remaining at around 2%. Fielding's term ended on 30 June 2011, after which the Family First Party no longer had federal parliamentary representation.

The Queensland Family First Senate candidate Wendy Francis created controversy when she compared allowing same-sex marriage to the stolen generations and to "legalising child abuse".

==== 2013 federal election ====
Bob Day ran as a Family First Party South Australia Senate candidate at the 2013 federal election and was successful. The South Australian Senate Family First vote was 3.8% (down 0.3%), getting to the 14.3% quota through Glenn Druery's Minor Party Alliance from 19 group voting ticket party preferences: Australian Independents Party, Australian Stable Population Party, Liberal Democratic Party, Smokers' Rights Party, No Carbon Tax Climate Sceptics, Building Australia Party, Rise Up Australia Party, Katter's Australian Party, One Nation, Australian Fishing and Lifestyle Party, Australian Christians, Shooters and Fishers, Australian Motoring Enthusiast Party, Democratic Labour Party, Animal Justice Party, Australian Greens, Palmer United Party, HEMP Party, Australian Labor Party. The nationwide Family First Senate vote was 1.1% (down 1.0%). Day assumed his seat on 1 July 2014.

==== 2016 federal election ====
As Family First's sole incumbent, Bob Day was unexpectedly successful at the 2016 federal election, despite having unsuccessfully mounted a High Court challenge against newly implemented Senate voting reforms which included the removal of group voting tickets, a feature which was crucial to the election of Day at the previous election. Though the South Australian Senate Family First vote was reduced to just 2.9% (down 0.9%), as the election was a double dissolution, the quota to be elected was halved. Day got to the 7.7% quota largely from Liberal preferences when the Liberal's 5th candidate Sean Edwards was eliminated from the count, largely due to the fact the Liberal how-to-vote card recommended Liberal voters to preference Family First. Electing only six Senators per state at a non-double dissolution election, the 12th and last spot in South Australia at this election came down to a race between Day and Labor's 4th candidate Anne McEwen. McEwen solidly led Day for the overwhelming majority of the count, until count 445 of a total 457. However, upon Edwards and then One Nation candidate Steven Burgess being eliminated at count 445 and 455 respectively, leaving only McEwen and Day remaining, Day had collected enough preferences to overtake and narrowly defeat McEwen − by just a couple of thousand preference votes.

The nationwide Family First Senate vote was 1.4% (up 0.3%). Elected to the 12th and final South Australian Senate spot, he was entitled to a three-year term.

Due to the failure of his home construction business, Day resigned from the Senate on 1 November 2016 and a replacement was expected to be selected in the following two to three weeks. In April 2017, the High Court found that he had been invalidly elected to the Senate at the 2016 election because the leasing arrangements for his electoral office had breached section 44 of the Constitution making him ineligible for the Senate, leading to a special recount of South Australian senate ballots to find a replacement.

On 13 April 2017 Lucy Gichuhi was declared the new South Australian senator in place of Day, following a recount of ballots. Her appointment was challenged by the Australian Labor Party but the High Court rejected the challenge as to whether she has renounced her Kenyan citizenship or retained a dual Kenyan and Australian citizenship. She became Australia's first African Senator.

==== Federal by-elections since 2004 ====
Following the resignation of Mark Latham and their acquisition of a Senate seat in 2004, Family First contested the 2005 Werriwa by-election and in the absence of a Liberal candidate received 2,890 first preference votes. They had not contested Werriwa in 2004.

As a result of their relatively poor form in the 2007 election, Family First did not contest the 2008 Gippsland by-election, but in a later by-election for the seat of Mayo they won 11.40% of the vote but only ran fourth in the absence of a Labor candidate, a total that was only 4% above their vote in the 2007 general election.

Family First did not stand a candidate in any of the 2008 Lyne, 2009 Bradfield or 2009 Higgins by-elections.

=== State elections ===
==== 2002 South Australian election ====
The first election Family First contested was the 2002 South Australian state election. Dr Andrew Evans received a primary vote of 4.02% which, along with preferences from other parties, was sufficient to obtain the 8.3% quota and get elected to one of the 11 seats in the South Australian Legislative Council.

==== State elections from 2004 until 2017 ====
In the 2005 Western Australian election, Family First polled 21,701 votes in the Legislative Council where it contested 34 candidates compared to 57 candidates in major parties.

In the 2006 South Australian election, Family First's vote increased to 4.98% in the Legislative Council, and a second Member of the Legislative Council was elected – former pharmaceutical executive Dennis Hood. In several rural and outer metropolitan seats, Family First's vote approached 10% – and in the seat of Kavel, Tom Playford, a descendant of former premier Tom Playford, achieved a vote of 15.7%. In the Legislative Council, Family First shares the balance of power with the other minor parties and independents.

In the 2006 Queensland state election, Family First received a primary vote of 7% in contested seats (many seats were not contested), with a high of 14.5% and several other seats posting results of 10%. Queensland does not have an upper house, and these results were insufficient for any candidates to be elected.

In the 2006 Victorian state election, Family First's vote increased from 1.9% to 4.3% of first preferences. However, no candidates were elected.

In the 2012 Queensland state election the party unsuccessfully contested 38 seats.

In the 2017 Western Australian state election, Family First fielded 2 candidates in each of the six Legislative Council regions, and three candidates for Legislative Assembly seats. Voting for the Legislative Council uses group voting tickets. At the 2017 election, Family First participated with four other parties in a set of preference deals orchestrated by Glenn Druery. The other parties were Fluoride Free WA, Liberal Democrats, Flux the System and the Daylight Saving Party. The deals were arranged so that the ticket votes for these five parties would roll up to a different party in each region. The system collected votes so that Family First's best chance was in the North Metropolitan region. However, the party did not gain any seats at the election.

== Defections from other parties ==
The party has benefited from a series of high-profile defections.

- Former South Australian state Liberal minister Robert Brokenshire contested the 2007 federal election for the party, and subsequently won preselection to replace retiring founder Evans in the state Legislative Council. At the 2010 South Australian Election, Robert Brokenshire was re-elected as a Family First candidate for a Legislative Council seat.
- In June 2008, former Western Australian deputy Liberal leader Dan Sullivan announced that he would become the parliamentary leader of the state branch of the party. Three former One Nation MPs also expressed support for the new party. On 14 August 2008, independent (former Liberal) Western Australian MP Anthony Fels joined the Party. At the 2008 Western Australian state election both Sullivan and Fels stood for seats in the Western Australian Legislative Council, but neither was successful. Fels remained a member of the Legislative Council until his term expired in May 2009.
- Also in June 2008, Bob Randall, a former South Australian Liberal MP and party president joined the party, complaining that the Liberal Party had drifted too far to the "left", and that "Family First is the only truly conservative political force now left in Australia".
- On 3 August 2008 Bob Day, a prominent Coalition fundraiser and Liberal candidate for Makin in the 2007 federal election announced that he was joining Family First. He contested the 2008 Mayo by-election for the party, gaining 11.4 percent of the primary vote, but was not elected.
- In New South Wales, former Christian Democratic Party MLC Gordon Moyes became an independent in 2009 for a few months before joining Family First. He was defeated at the 2011 state election.
- In June 2013, former Katter's Australian Party candidate and national director Aidan McLindon joined Family First and was the lead Senate candidate for Family First in Queensland in the 2013 federal election.

== Political ideology ==
=== Environment and climate change ===
- Opposition to any emissions trading scheme or 'carbon tax' and government subsidies to renewable energy.
- Support for an independent enquiry which is prepared to hear scientists who disagree with climate change.

=== Education ===
- Support for independent (private) school funding.
- Allow principals and school councils to choose staff based on 'values'.
- Allow schools to direct their own building improvement works, rather than relying on governments.

=== Bioethics and family policy ===
- Opposition to late term abortion in most cases.
- Opposition to voluntary euthanasia.
- Support for retention of the definition of marriage as between a man and a woman to the exclusion of all others (i.e opposition to same-sex marriage).
- Opposition to surrogacy in all forms (including altruistic surrogacy).
- Support for programs which encourage families to be 'self-reliant' and reduce the need for government assistance.

=== Economy ===
- Support for a 20/20/20 tax system ($20,000 tax-free threshold, 20 percent flat income tax and 20 percent flat company tax).
- Opposition to payroll and mining taxes.
- Abolition of the Commonwealth Grants Commission.
- Support for lowering small business taxes.

=== Employment and workplace relations ===
- Belief in workplace deregulation and that legislation designed to protect workers rights is bad for the economy and morally wrong.
- Removal of workplace regulations and awards to combat the "welfare reliance" of Australians.
- Support for the freedom of those who choose to work differently by moving out of the regulated world of 'traditional employment'.
- Family First was opposed to some aspects of the Howard government's Australian Workplace Agreement measures. In his maiden speech, Senator Steve Fielding argued for a fairer work, rest and 'family time' (or leisure balance) in opposing the measures.

=== Immigration ===
- Support for fast on-shore processing for asylum seekers and opposition to the Pacific Solution.

=== Indigenous affairs ===
- Opposition to the Native Title Act as it currently stands, as Native Title rights do not confer the right to sell, lease, develop or offer the land as security for economic development.
- Belief that 'the only long-term solution is for Aboriginal Australians to move into the modern world and connect with the modern economy'.
- Repeal of any law which distinguishes between any Australian on the basis of race or colour.

=== Housing and property development ===
- Support removal of urban growth boundaries and zoning restrictions.
- Privatisation of planning approvals and removal of up-front infrastructure charges.
- Opposition to the 'progressive erosion' of property owners' rights through legislation, heritage listing, water restrictions, native vegetation, rising sea levels, zoning and court decisions.

=== Poverty ===
- Support for education and training to take people out of poverty.
- Support for foreign aid.

=== Drugs ===
- Support for rehabilitation and recovery programs and for prison-based programs to address drug use.
- Opposition to injecting rooms as 'expensive and ineffective'.

== Structure ==
Family First was incorporated as a company limited by guarantee and managed by an executive committee comprising the board of directors. Decision making was tightly held within the executive group, including the capacity to elect new members to the executive, determine party policy and ratify candidate pre-selection.

A National Conference occurred every two years, with delegates from state party licensees. Federal and State branches held Annual General Meetings that were open to all members.

== Political relations ==
David Leyonhjelm of the Liberal Democratic Party and Day announced their intention to vote as a bloc in the Senate on economic issues, but separately on social issues.

Family First and the Australian Greens were often at odds, with Family First often referring to the Greens as "extreme" in their media statements. The two parties were in competition for Senate preferences, particularly from the Labor Party, and were ideologically opposed on many issues.

== Former members ==
=== Church and state ===
Church and State (CAS) is a conservative non-denominational Christian "political education ministry" founded in 2016 by David Pellowe, who was a candidate for FFA in the 2015 Queensland state election and 2016 Australian federal election, but since 2016 has no affiliation to the party.

== See also ==
- List of political parties in Australia
- Christian right
- Christian politics in Australia
- Australian Christians
- Christian Democratic Party (Australia)

== Bibliography ==
- Margaret Simons: Faith, Money and Power: What the Religious Revival Means for Politics: North Melbourne: Pluto Press: 2007
