= Minor Party Alliance =

- Abbreviation: MPA; Alliance
- Founder: Glenn Druery
- Founded: 2011; 15 years ago
- Victorian Legislative Council: 2 / 40

The Minor Party Alliance (MPA), also known simply as the Alliance, is an alliance of small Australian political parties, currently active in Victorian state politics. It was created by Glenn Druery's "Independent Liaison" business, which assists in organising preference meetings and negotiating preference flows between minor parties (also referred to as micro-parties).

The aim of the MPA is the election of its candidates to Australian upper houses, based upon the accumulation of their primary votes and the registered "above-the-line" (or "group voting ticket") party preferences to reach an electoral quota. The MPA effectively aims to "game" the electoral system, an act it believes to be justified, based upon their perception that the Australian electoral system is unfair and heavily biased against minor parties.

Since 2016, group voting tickets are no longer used in Senate elections. As of 2025, the Victorian Legislative Council is the only state parliamentary chamber that uses the system, and two parties with seats in the Legislative Council are members of the Alliance.

== History ==
=== 1999 New South Wales state election ===
Druery initiated the MPA at the 1999 New South Wales state election and his then untested theories elected three people to the Legislative Council: Peter Wong from Unity, Peter Breen from Reform the Legal System and Malcolm Jones from the Outdoor Recreation Party. Malcolm Jones was elected to the Legislative Council with a primary vote of 0.19%, or 0.042 of a quota.

In 2017, Druery during an ABC report, has said he has a personal vendetta against Pauline Hanson One Nation, saying he has been directing micro party preferences away from One Nation since 1999.

=== 2013 Australian federal election ===
Druery is known as the "preference whisperer" of Australian politics, and his Minor Party Alliance was behind the 2013 federal election preference deal successes. These resulted in the election to the Senate of Wayne Dropulich of the Sports Party in Western Australia on a primary vote of 0.2%, Ricky Muir of the Motoring Enthusiasts Party in Victoria on a primary vote of 0.5% and Bob Day of the Family First Party on a primary vote of 3.8% in South Australia. However, the Western Australian result was later declared void (for semi-unrelated reasons), necessitating a further election at which the Sports Party candidate was unsuccessful. The fifth Senators in the other States were Dio Wang in Western Australia, Glenn Lazarus in Queensland and Jacqui Lambie in Tasmania, all from the Palmer United Party, and David Leyonhjelm of the Liberal Democratic Party elected with a primary vote of 9.5% in New South Wales. These last four were not part of the MPA.

Muir's primary vote was 0.5% and achieved the 14.3% quota from 23 "above the line" party preferences: Bank Reform Party, Australian Fishing and Lifestyle Party, HEMP Party, Shooters and Fishers, Australian Stable Population Party, Senator Online, Building Australia Party, Family First Party, Bullet Train For Australia, Rise Up Australia Party, No Carbon Tax Climate Sceptics, Citizens Electoral Council, Palmer United Party, Democratic Labour Party, Katter's Australian Party, Socialist Equality Party, Australian Sex Party, Australian Voice Party, Wikileaks Party, Drug Law Reform, Stop CSG, Animal Justice Party, and the Australian Independents Party.

Day's primary vote was 3.8% (down 0.3% since the previous election), and achieved the 14.3% quota from 19 "above the line" party preferences: Australian Independents Party, Australian Stable Population Party, Liberal Democratic Party, Smokers' Rights Party, No Carbon Tax Climate Sceptics, Building Australia Party, Rise Up Australia Party, Katter's Australian Party, One Nation, Australian Fishing and Lifestyle Party, Australian Christians, Shooters and Fishers, Australian Motoring Enthusiast Party, Democratic Labour Party, Animal Justice Party, Australian Greens, Palmer United Party, HEMP Party, Australian Labor Party.

Druery also helped the Shooters and Fishers Party, Family First Party and the Fishing and Lifestyle Party. After the 2013 federal election Druery was hired by the newly elected Motor Enthusiast Party Senator Ricky Muir as Chief of Staff, but later parted company with Muir.

=== 2017 Western Australian state election ===
Western Australia continues to use group voting tickets for the Western Australian Legislative Council. At the 2017 Western Australian state election, five parties participated in preference deals orchestrated by Druery. The parties were Family First, Fluoride Free WA, Liberal Democrats, Flux the System and the Daylight Saving Party. The deals were arranged so that the ticket votes for these five parties would roll up to a different party in each region. At the election only the Liberal Democrat candidate, Aaron Stonehouse, with 1.77% of primary votes was elected with MPA preferences.

=== 2018 Victorian state election ===
Victoria continues to use group voting tickets for the Victorian Legislative Council. Preference deals were also organised by Druery for the Victorian Legislative Council at the 2018 Victorian state election. All but one of the 18 parties standing appear to have been involved in some way in the deals. Ultimately, 10 candidates from seven micro-parties were elected. In the Eastern Metropolitan Region, Rod Barton of the Transport Matters Party was elected on a primary vote of 0.62%. In the Southern Metropolitan Region, Clifford Hayes of the Sustainable Australia was elected on a primary vote of 1.32%. One candidate was elected from the Shooters and Fishers Party, the Reason Party and the Animal Justice Party, two from the Liberal Democratic Party and three from the Justice Party.

=== 2022 Victorian state election ===
On November 16, 2022, Angry Victorians Party party leader Heston Russell leaked a video to the Herald Sun of him to talking to Glenn Druery about a potential preference deal, declaring that the AVP felt the co-ordination of the group voting ticket system used by Druery was immoral and needed to be exposed.

During 2022 Victorian state election Druery was reported to be working with the Democratic Labour Party, Derryn Hinch's Justice Party, Health Australia, the Liberal Democrats, the New Democrats, Shooters, Fishers and Farmers, Sustainable Australia and Transport Matters. He was working with the Animal Justice Party but they tricked him, by leaving the alliance at the last minute.

== Members ==
=== Current ===
Party		Victorian MLCs	Joined MPA	Registered	Ideology
LP	Libertarian Party	1 / 40	2017	Yes	Classical liberalism, right-libertarianism
SFF	Shooters, Fishers and Farmers Party	1 / 40	2013	Yes	Green conservatism, agrarianism
DLP	Democratic Labour Party	0 / 40	2013	Yes	Social conservatism, distributism
ND	New Democrats	0 / 40	2022	Yes	Anti-corruption
SAP	Sustainable Australia Party	0 / 40	2013	Yes	Environmentalism, sustainable development

=== Former (with representation) ===
The following parties had at least one member elected through group voting tickets while a member of the MPA.

Party		Seats won while in MPA	Years in MPA	Ideology
AJP	Animal Justice Party	Vic: (2018): 1 (disputed)	2013−2022	Animal welfare, vegan politics
AMEP	Australian Motoring Enthusiast Party	Senate: (2013): 1	2013−2016	Motoring enthusiast rights
SEX	Australian Sex Party	Vic: (2014): 1	2013−2017	Sex positivity, civil libertarianism
ASP	Australian Sports Party	Senate: (2013): 1 (result voided)	2013−2015	Outdoor recreation advocacy
DSP	Daylight Saving Party	WA: (2021): 1	2017−2021	Daylight saving time advocacy
DHJP	Derryn Hinch's Justice Party	Vic: (2018): 3 (partially disputed)	2016−2023	Law and order, anti-paedophilia
FFP	Family First Party	SA: (2014): 1	2013−2017	Social conservatism
TMP	Transport Matters Party	Vic: (2018): 1	2018−2023	Taxi industry advocacy

=== Former (without representation) ===
The following parties did not have any members elected through group voting tickets while a member of the MPA.

Party		Registered	Years in MPA	Ideology
AVP	Angry Victorians Party	Yes	2022 (disputed)	Veterans' rights, populism
ABP	Aussie Battler Party	Yes	2018−2019	Australian nationalism, right-wing populism
AC	Australian Christians	Yes	2013−2014	Social conservatism
DEM	Australian Democrats	Yes	2013−2015	Liberalism
AI	Australian Independents	Yes	2013	
AFP	Australia First Party	Yes	2013−2016	Australian nationalism, neo-fascism
APP	Australian Protectionist Party	Yes	2013−2015	Protectionism, social conservatism
AVP	Australian Voice Party	Yes	2013−2015	Anti-Islam
AFLP	Australian Fishing and Lifestyle Party	Yes	2013−2014	Outdoor recreation rights
BAP	Building Australia Party	Yes	2013−2016	Building industry rights
BTFA	Bullet Train for Australia	Yes	2013−2016	High-speed rail advocacy
CDP	Christian Democratic Party	Yes	2013−2016	Christian democracy, conservatism
DLRA	Drug Law Reform Australia	Yes	2013−2016	Drug policy reform
FFWA	Fluoride Free WA	Yes	2017−2019	Anti-mandatory water fluoridation
FLUX	Flux	Yes	2017−2021	Issue-based direct democracy
HAP	Health Australia Party	Yes	2013−2024	Naturopathy, anti-vaccination
HEMP	Help End Marijuana Prohibition (HEMP) Party	Yes	2013−2016	Cannabis legalisation
LMP	Legalise Marijuana Party	No	2022	Cannabis legalisation
MP	Mutual Party (Note: The Mutual Party was known as the Bank Reform Party until 20 February 2014.)	Yes	2013−2015	Centrism
NCTCS	No Carbon Tax Climate Sceptics	Yes	2013−2015	Anthropogenic global warming denial
NCPP	Non-Custodial Parents Party	Yes	2013−2016	Fathers' rights
ON	One Nation	Yes	2013	Australian nationalism, national conservatism
RDSD	Restore Democracy Sack Dan Andrews Party	Yes	2022 (disputed)	Anti-corruption
RUAP	Rise Up Australia Party	Yes	2013−2016	Australian nationalism, social conservatism
SO	Senator Online	Yes	2013−2016	Electronic direct democracy
SCSG	Stop CSG Party	Yes	2013−2015	Anti-coal seam gas
UAP	Uniting Australia Party	Yes	2013−2015	
VEP	Voluntary Euthanasia Party	Yes	2013−2020	Voluntary euthanasia reform advocacy
WAP	Western Australia Party	Yes	2017−2021	Regionalism, populism
WLP	WikiLeaks Party	Yes	2013−2015	Left-libertarianism

== Timeline ==
W	Part of MPA and won seat
Y	Part of MPA
N	Not part of MPA
−	Party disbanded, did not exist, or did not contest election

Eight state and federal elections using group voting tickets have taken place since the formation of the Alliance.

Party	2013 (fed)	2014 (SA)	2014 (fed)	2014 (Vic)	2017 (WA)	2018 (Vic)	2021 (WA)	2022 (Vic)
Animal Justice	Y	Y	Y			N		N
Australian Sports	W	−	Y	−	−	−	−	−
Australian Voice	Y	Y	−	−	−	−	−	−
Daylight Saving	−	−	−	−	Y	−	W	−
Family First	W	W	Y	Y	Y	−	−	−
Fishing and Lifestyle	Y	Y	Y	−	−	−	−	−
Justice	−	−	−	−	−	W	−	Y
Libertarian (Note: The Libertarian Party was known as the Liberal Democratic Party until 2023.)	N	N	N	N	W	W	Y	W
Motoring Enthusiast	W	Y	−	−	−	−	−	−
New Democrats	−	−	−	−	−	−	−	Y
Sex	Y	−	Y	W	−	−	−	−
Transport Matters	−	−	−	−	−	W	−	Y
WikiLeaks	Y	Y	−	−	−	−	−	−
Uniting Australia	Y	−	−	−	−	−	−	−

== See also ==
- Alliance for Progress
