= Maffra Secondary College =

Location
- Maffra, Victoria; Australia; 37.9644°S 146.9828°E

Information
- Type: Co-educational government school
- Established: 1950s
- Principal: Jennifer Roep
- Grades: 7–12 (VCE, VCAL and VET)
- Enrolment: ~650
- Campus: Maffra
- Colours: Red (Macalister), blue (Avon), green (Freestone) and gold (Thompson)
- Newspaper: Maffra Secondary College (weekly newsletter)
- Yearbook: Maffra Secondary College

Maffra Secondary College is a Year 7 to Year 12 government secondary college situated in the Gippsland town of Maffra, Victoria. It has around 700 students enrolled from Year 7 to 12, and takes in students from Maffra and surrounding towns, including Boisdale, Newry, Stratford, Heyfield, Valencia Creek, Briagolong and Cowwarr.

The school logo is a painting of the local banksia species Banksia canei with the words "Maffra Secondary College" encircled around it. The Banksia canei was named after a long-time school councillor Bill Cane, who was a local botanist.

== Facilities ==
In 2002, a new science and technology wing was opened at the college, providing new, modern science labs, teaching classrooms, woodwork rooms, IT facilities and staff rooms for the growing school. The health, textiles and food technology wing was also upgraded, with new kitchens and a new canteen built. There have been new plans drawn up for more refurbishments and buildings for the school.

== Academic programs ==
Maffra Secondary College has a large number of programs for students, including the new eXel program for Year 9 students. It has a strong VCE program, offering a large variety of Year 11 and 12 subjects. It also offers the VCAL program as an alternative program to the VCE.

The school offers VCE subjects from a range of areas such as the sciences, arts and humanities, technology and physical and outdoor education. Indonesian and Mandarin are offered as languages at MSC, with other major languages such as German and Italian studied via Distance Education.

=== VCE ===
Maffra SC offers a wide variety of subjects for students the study in VCE. These include:

- Science – Biology, Chemistry, Physics, Psychology
- Art – Art, Studio Art, Theatre Studies, Music (Group performance), Visual Communication and Design, Media.
- Humanities – English, History (Revolutions), Literature, Legal Studies.
- Mathematics – General/Further Mathematics, Mathematical Methods CAS.
- Language – Indonesian. German, Italian, Latin and Spanish can be taken by VSL.
- Physical Education – Physical Education, Outdoor and Environmental Studies, Health and Human Development
- Information Technology – Information Technology Development.

== Sporting ==
Maffra Secondary College has numerous sporting teams including football, netball, basketball, clay target shooting and soccer. These teams compete against other schools in the district in inter-school competitions. Each year in summer the inter-house swimming competition is held at the 50m Maffra Pool, while in winter, the athletics day and cross country are held. Hiking and camping are also a part of the school program due to its close proximity to national parks and bushland.

== Uniform ==
Maffra Secondary College uniform consists of a white polo shirt with the school logo on the top left corner on the chest. The winter uniform for girls is a tartan type skirt which is mostly navy, with the white polo shirt and a navy windcheater with the school logo on it. For boys, grey trousers with the school shirt and jumper is worn. In summer, girls can wear a school dress which is blue and white checked. Boys can wear grey shorts with the white shirt. Year 12 students are able to wear a special VCE rugby top over their school uniform in the second half of the school year.

== Dux of the College ==
Dux of the College is awarded to the Year 12 student with the highest ENTER/ATAR score for that year in the VCE. Past Dux recipients:

- 2019 – Mathew Angliss
- 2018 – Adele O’Doherty
- 2017 – Jack Hargreaves
- 2016 – Brody Hadden
- 2015 – Letitia Abdoo
- 2014 – Marni Cox-Livingstone
- 2013 – Erin Liddel
- 2012 – Patrick Elliott
- 2011 – Chelsea Hair
- 2010 – Ben Zmijewski
- 2009 – Madeleine Goodman
- 2008 – Wendy Allan
- 2007 – Chris Gargan-Shingles
- 2006 – Glen Swinburne
- 2005 – Jason Malcolm
- 2004 – Peter McNamara
- 2003 – Jade Goodge, Karla Cameron
- 2002 – Ruth McNamara

== Alumni ==
- Jake Kovco, the first Australian soldier to be killed in the war in Iraq, was a former student at Maffra Secondary College, completing his VCE there in 1998.
- Ricky Muir, Australian senator from the Australian Motoring Enthusiast Party
