= Uniting Australia Party =

- Leader: John Smith
- Founded: March 2012; 14 years ago
- Registered: 5 June 2013; 13 years ago
- Dissolved: 23 July 2015; 11 years ago

Website
- unitingaustraliaparty.com.au

The Uniting Australia Party was a minor Australian political party that ran candidates in the 2013 federal election. During the campaign it attracted attention for thwarting Clive Palmer's attempts to name his party the "United Australia Party", since it had registered first and the names were too similar.

The party was involved in Glenn Druery's Minor Party Alliance (MPA).

The party was deregistered by the Australian Electoral Commission in July 2015, after failing to respond to the AEC's notice to confirm eligibility for registration.
