= Bullet Train for Australia =

Defunct political party in Australia

Bullet Train For Australia
- Leader: Tim Bohm
- Founded: 2012
- Registered: 17 May 2013
- Dissolved: 23 May 2017
- Political position: Single-issue advocating high-speed rail in Australia

Website
- Home - Bullet Train for Australia

Bullet Train for Australia, formerly known as Bullet Train for Canberra, was an Australian political party, registered from 2013 to 2017. It was a single-issue party campaigning for a fast implementation of high-speed rail. It advocated that the first stage of the bullet train should run from Melbourne to Newcastle via Canberra and Sydney, and be built within five years.

The party first contested the 2012 ACT election, gaining around 9,000 votes, representing 4% of first preference votes. The party was renamed to Bullet Train For Australia in 2013 and had 18 candidates in the federal election that year, in the ACT, NSW and Victoria.

The party was involved in Glenn Druery's Minor Party Alliance (MPA) and the Alliance for Progress.

The party fielded four candidates for seats in the House of Representatives in the ACT, NSW and Victoria in the 2016 federal election.

On 23 May 2017, the Australian Electoral Commission approved the party's application for voluntary deregistration.

== See also ==
- High-speed rail in Australia
- Transport in Australia
