= Helen Kroger =

Australian politician

Chief Government Whip in the Senate
- In office 18 September 2013 – 1 July 2014
- Prime Minister: Tony Abbott
- Preceded by: Anne McEwen
- Succeeded by: David Bushby

Senator for Victoria
- In office 1 July 2008 – 30 June 2014
- Preceded by: Rod Kemp
- Succeeded by: Ricky Muir

Personal details
- Born: Helen Evelyn Madden; 11 March 1959 (age 67) Melbourne, Victoria, Australia
- Party: Liberal Party of Australia
- Spouse: Michael Kroger (divorced)
- Education: Monash University

Helen Evelyn Kroger (née Madden; born 11 March 1959) is a former Australian politician. She was a Liberal member of the Australian Senate representing the state of Victoria from 2008 to 2014. She was the president of the Victorian division of the Liberal Party from 2003 to 2006.

Kroger was the Liberal candidate for the Melbourne seat of Bruce at the 2016 election, where she lost the two-party-preferred vote by a margin of 9.48% to Labor candidate Julian Hill.

== Early life ==
Kroger was born Helen Madden in Melbourne. She studied economics at Monash University in the 1970s, where she met her future husband Michael Kroger. After graduating from Monash, she worked in human resources and recruitment at IBM and KPMG. She married Michael Kroger in the early 1980s, and they had two sons. The couple later divorced.

Kroger left the corporate world and ran Blacamoor Delicatessen, a small delicatessen in Malvern East.

== Political career ==
In the 1970s, Kroger played an active role in the Young Liberals.

In 1999, she stood for preselection in the state seat of Burwood when it was vacated by Jeff Kennett in 1999, but was beaten by Lana McLean. In 2003 she became President of the Victorian Division of the Liberal Party of Australia.

Kroger was elected to the Australian Senate for Victoria at the 2007 federal election, after being preselected in the safe second position on the Liberal ticket, behind Mitch Fifield and ahead of number three candidate Scott Ryan. She commenced office on 1 July 2008.

In July 2011, she became Chief Opposition Whip in the Senate. In May 2012, Kroger was preselected for the vulnerable third-place position on the Victorian Senate ticket at the 2013 election, adding some risk to her chances of re-election. Additionally, members of the Liberal Party moved to replace her as Senate Whip by arranging a party room spill for her position, until party leader Tony Abbott intervened.

Kroger was a member of a Liberal- and Labor-dominated committee that advocated the change to the method of voting in Senate elections that came into force at the 2016 federal election. She was defeated at the 2013 federal election for the sixth Senate place in Victoria, losing to Ricky Muir from the Australian Motoring Enthusiast Party.

On 2 July 2016, Kroger was defeated as a Liberal candidate for the electorate of Bruce by Julian Hill of the Labor Party.

Party political offices
Preceded by Stephen Parry	Chief Opposition Whip in the Senate; 2011–2013	Succeeded by Anne McEwen
Preceded by Anne McEwen	Chief Government Whip in the Senate; 2013–2014	Succeeded by David Bushby
