= United Australia Party (2013) =

Political party in Australia

- Abbreviation: UAP
- Leader: Ralph Babet
- Chairman: Clive Palmer
- National Director: Neil Favager
- Founded: April 2013; 13 years ago (as Palmer United Party)
- Headquarters: 240 Queen Street, Brisbane, Queensland
- Youth wing: Young United Australia Party
- Membership (2022): 80,000+ (disputed)
- Ideology: Conservatism (Australian); Australian nationalism Right-wing populism
- Political position: Right-wing to far-right
- Colours: Yellow
- Slogan: Make Australia Great
- Anthem: "The UAP Anthem"
- House of Representatives: 0 / 151
- Senate: 1 / 76
- Rural City of Swan Hill: 1 / 8
- Shire of Murray: 1 / 6
- Shire of Strathbogie: 1 / 7

Website
- www.unitedaustraliaparty.org.au

The United Australia Party (UAP), formerly known as Clive Palmer's United Australia Party and the Palmer United Party (PUP), is an Australian political party formed by billionaire mining magnate Clive Palmer in April 2013. The party was deregistered by the Australian Electoral Commission in 2017, revived and re-registered in 2018, and voluntarily deregistered in 2022 (but remained registered in Victoria). It was re-registered again in 2026. The party fielded candidates in all 150 House of Representatives seats at the 2013 federal election. Palmer, the party's leader, was elected to the Division of Fairfax and it reached a peak of three senators following the rerun of the Western Australian Senate election in 2014. When the party was revived under its original name in 2018, it was represented by ex-One Nation senator Brian Burston in the federal parliament.

At state and territory level, the party has been represented in the Parliaments of Queensland and the Northern Territory. Two members of the Queensland Legislative Assembly joined in April 2013, while three members of the Northern Territory Legislative Assembly, joined the party in April 2014. Both the Queensland members and the NT members left the party later in 2014. The party unsuccessfully contested the South Australian, Tasmanian, and Victorian state elections in 2014. Since the COVID-19 pandemic in Australia, the party has supported anti-lockdown politics.

On 23 August 2021, independent MP Craig Kelly joined the party, becoming its first representative in the lower house since Palmer's retirement in 2016. Kelly became the leader of the party, with Palmer acting as the party's chairman. The UAP announced a preference deal with the Liberal Democrats for the 2022 federal election, where each party encouraged its supporters to choose the other as their second preference. Candidates were endorsed to run in every lower house seat in the May 2022 federal election as well as the senate and Ralph Babet was elected as a senator for Victoria at that election.

== History ==
=== Foundation ===
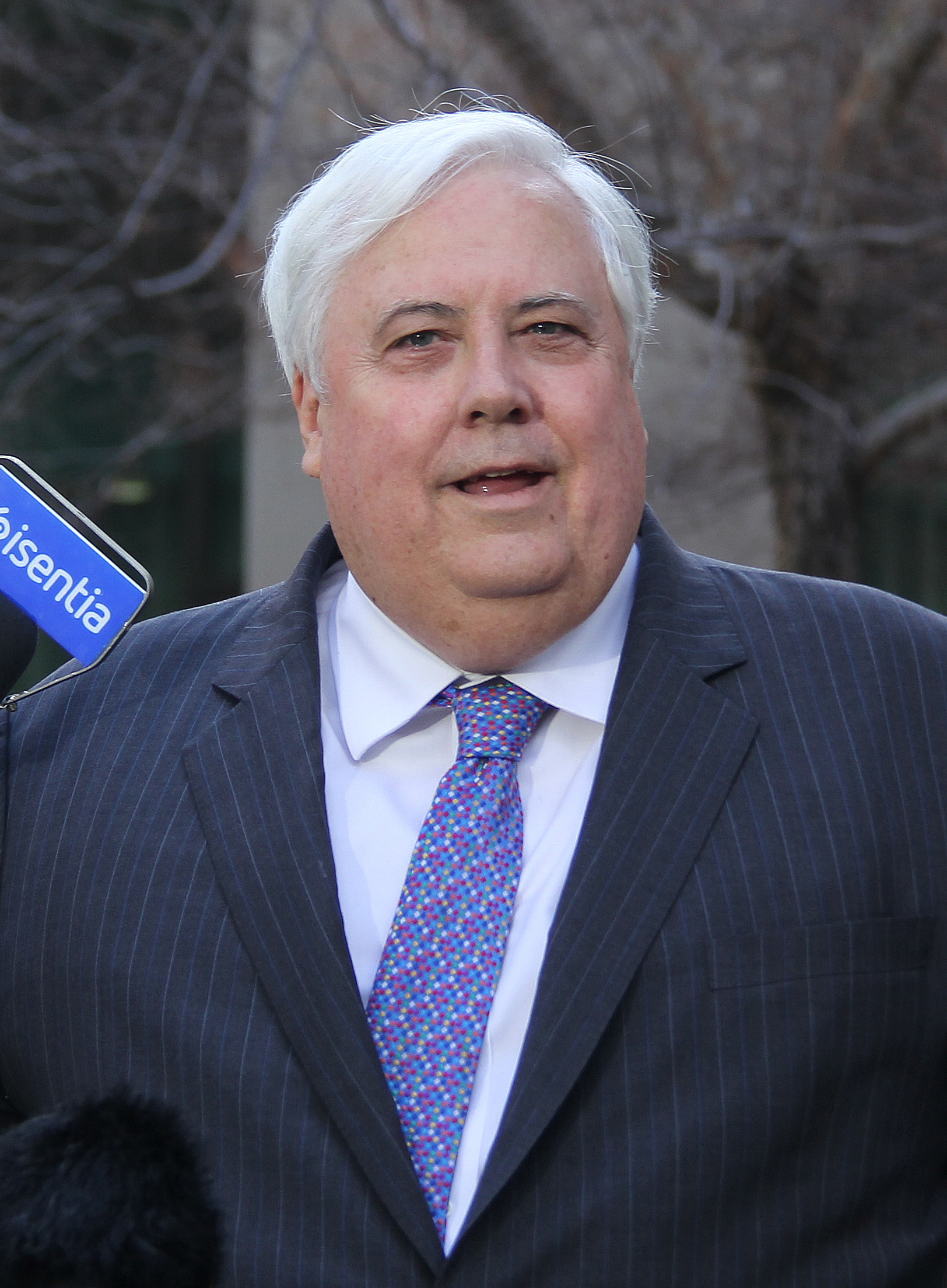
Clive Palmer, party founder

Palmer announced in November 2012 he was considering re-forming the United Australia Party, which ceased to exist after it was folded into the present-day Liberal Party of Australia in 1945. He had been a longtime supporter of the federal National Party and the Liberal National Party of Queensland (LNP). Palmer's nephew, Blair Brewster, had applied to trademark the party name two months earlier. There was speculation that it would join forces with Katter's Australian Party, but this did not take place. A month following the party's founding, Palmer announced that the party would be renamed the Palmer United Party, so that registration could be granted, and to avoid confusion with a separate party that was already registered with the Australian Electoral Commission, the Uniting Australia Party. The party continued to brand itself as a revival of the old United Australia Party, with the party’s website claiming that the three leaders of the original party—Joseph Lyons, Robert Menzies and Billy Hughes—were its former leaders.

=== 2013 and 2014 elections ===
In April 2013, Palmer announced he was relaunching the UAP with the goal of running candidates in the 2013 federal election and had applied for registration in Queensland. He told Lateline "It's a reformation of the original party". The party also endorsed candidates to run in the Senate. In the state of Victoria, two retired sportsmen were announced as Senate candidates: Australian rules football player Doug Hawkins and boxer Barry Michael. Peter Slipper, the independent (formerly LNP) member for the Division of Fisher (and previously Speaker of the House of Representatives), joined the party on 11 May 2013, but the party revoked his membership within hours.

In the 2013 election, Palmer won the Sunshine Coast-area seat of Fairfax with a 26 percent primary and 50.03 percent two-candidate preferred vote, a margin of 53 votes. Senate candidates Glenn Lazarus (a former player of the National Rugby League's Canberra Raiders, Brisbane Broncos and Melbourne Storm) and Jacqui Lambie were elected for Queensland and Tasmania on preferences, after primary votes of 10 percent and 7 percent respectively. The nationwide vote in the Senate was 5 percent. The outcome of the Senate vote in Western Australia was disputed and the Australian Electoral Commission ordered a re-run of the vote for April 2014.

In October 2013, Australian Motoring Enthusiast Party senator-elect Ricky Muir, of Victoria, agreed to enter into an informal alliance with the PUP. One of the seats in Western Australia’s special election was won by the PUP’s Dio Wang, with first preferences of 12%, an increase of 7%, giving the PUP bloc four senators when new members took their seats in July 2014. Muir soon left the alliance, followed by Lambie who resigned to sit as an independent in November 2014, and similarly, Lazarus in March 2015.

Following the April 2014 Western Australian special election, an advertising monitoring company reported that the PUP spent A$477,000 on TV advertising during the party's re-election campaign, which exceeded the combined spending of the Liberal, Labor and Greens parties on campaign advertising.

=== Resignations and deregistration ===
On 11 August 2014, Queensland Palmer United Party MP Alex Douglas resigned from the party to become an independent citing cronyism: "When I resigned from the LNP in November, 2012, I publicly stated there was a culture in the LNP, and there still is, of looking after mates and relatives, and that I do not support these flawed ideas."

On 8 September 2014, Northern Territory PUP MP Francis Xavier Kurrupuwu resigned from the party and returned to the CLP, saying "there is no party structure in PUP and no help available". He said that Palmer had promised to give resources and staff to himself, Anderson and Lee, but had got "nothing" at all. He added that Palmer hadn't met with him at all since his initial defection from CLP.

On 8 October 2014, Queensland's only remaining PUP MP Carl Judge resigned from the party to become an independent.

On 24 November 2014, Senator Jacqui Lambie resigned from the PUP, announcing that she would remain in the Senate as an independent. Lambie's resignation followed several weeks of disagreements with party leader Clive Palmer, culminating in her voting with a group of senators calling themselves the "coalition of common sense" in passing a disallowance motion on legislation supported by PUP to repeal the Future of Financial Advice reforms introduced by the previous Labor government.

On 29 November 2014, Northern Territory MPs Alison Anderson and Larisa Lee announced they were resigning from the PUP to sit as independents. Anderson stated that she and Lee could no longer tolerate the "absolute chaos" in a party that had become a "national disgrace". She also accused the PUP of doing almost nothing to connect with them. Lee said that the PUP had "just kind of left (us) in the dark" after promising that she, Anderson and Kurrupuwu would be in a position to carry the party's banner and help them fight for Aboriginal rights.

On 13 March 2015, Queensland Senator Glenn Lazarus announced his resignation from the PUP, accusing Clive Palmer of bullying, swearing and yelling at people. Lazarus stated "I have a different view of team work. Given this, I felt it best that I resign from the party and pursue my senate role as an independent senator." His wife Tess Sanders-Lazarus joined in, saying "I did make it clear to Clive that I was not happy with being bullied and spoken to using foul language." Palmer sacked her and denied their accusations. PUP national director Peter Burke, responded by saying: "There is no doubting the timing of Senator Lazarus's defection from the party which came after Tess' sacking as a result of her not doing her job." Mr Burke said Tess Lazarus was dismissed for spending her time writing speeches and questions for her husband instead of working on agreed party duties. "After repeated efforts to have her engage in the correct party duties were ignored, the party had no alternative but to dismiss her."

Palmer United Party support collapsed at the 2015 federal by-elections, losing more than two thirds of its vote at the December 2015 North Sydney by-election, polling last of 13 candidates with a primary vote of just 0.5 percent, compared to 1.7 percent at the 2013 federal election. The party lost more than half its vote at the September 2015 Canning by-election with a primary vote of 3.1 percent, compared to 6.9 percent at the previous election.

Despite having had four parliamentarians elected at the 2013 election and subsequent 2014 Western Australian Senate election, only one, Dio Wang, contested the 2016 federal election for the Palmer United Party. Glenn Lazarus and Jacqui Lambie quit the party mid-term. In early May 2016, party leader Clive Palmer announced he would not seek re-election to his seat of Fairfax and later that month also ruled out running for a federal senate seat, ending his involvement in Australian electoral politics. The party fielded a single House of Representatives candidate in the Division of Herbert, and senate candidates in every state. Two months later, Wang lost his Senate seat in the double dissolution election, as the Party lost all representation in a near-total swing against it, receiving less than 0.01% of the House of Representatives vote.

On 23 September 2016, the PUP applied for deregistration in all states. A party spokesperson stated that the party was always set up primarily as a federal party, but would no longer contest state elections.

On 19 April 2017, Clive Palmer announced that he was formally disbanding the Palmer United Party and would cancel its registration as a federal political party with the Australian Electoral Commission. It was formally deregistered on 5 May 2017.

=== 2018 revival ===
On 23 February 2018, Palmer announced that he would register the party again to contest seats at the next federal election. On 17 June 2018, he relaunched the party as the United Australia Party.

On 18 June 2018, Clive Palmer announced the reformation of the party as the United Australia Party, with former One Nation senator, Brian Burston joining as its first political member and senate leader. It was re-registered by the Australian Electoral Commission on 12 December 2018.

As the 2019 federal election approached, the party faced a series of controversies. It was reported that the nomination papers submitted by at least 19 UAP candidates were too incomplete or inconsistent to demonstrate that they are not dual citizens, which would render them ineligible under section 44 of the Constitution, although the nomination forms require candidates to affirm that they are eligible under s 44. In May, the claim made in her campaign material by Queensland UAP Senate candidate Yodie Batzke that she was an "adjunct lecturer" at the Cairns campus of James Cook University was denied by that organisation. It said that she had delivered guest lectures there but was not an adjunct lecturer.

The party contested every lower house seat in the 2019 Australian federal election and made a preference deal with the Liberal party. The UAP failed to win seats in either chamber, but by directing its preferences to the LNP, the UAP helped the LNP garner a two-seat swing in Queensland, thereby allowing the Coalition to regain its majority.

In 2020, the party's founder, Clive Palmer, was charged with fraud and corporate misconduct offences. It was alleged that he had diverted at least $10 million to the benefit of the Palmer United Party in the weeks before the 2013 election. Palmer spent $60 million at the 2019 election.

The United Australia Party was renamed as Clive Palmer's United Australia Party on 31 January 2020.

=== 2021 iteration ===
On 11 August 2021, an application for the party name United Australia Party and party abbreviation UAP to be officially registered was approved by the Australian Electoral Commission (AEC).

On 23 August 2021, Independent MP Craig Kelly having been elected as the Liberal representative for the seat of Hughes, joined the party. Kelly became the leader of the party, with Palmer remaining as the party's chairman. In September 2021 Craig Kelly and the UAP started a mass SMS campaign; there was a negative backlash to the campaign with many people referring to the messages as spam and questioning the legality of such messages.

In September 2021, the Sydney Morning Herald reported on objections to the application to change the name to the United Australia Party that had been made to the AEC. The objections described it as an act of political anachronism and cultural appropriation or theft.

==== 2022 election ====
Several of the UAP's Senate candidates for the 2022 Australian federal election have espoused anti-vaccine beliefs, or are business associates of Palmer himself.

The UAP encouraged supporters to preference most sitting MPs last on their votes, except in seats with MPs that support policies proposed by Craig Kelly. Seats where the UAP did not preference the incumbent last include Bass (TAS), Chisholm (VIC), Flynn (QLD), Greenway (NSW), Mackellar (NSW), Reid (NSW), Wentworth (NSW) and Wide Bay (QLD).

Despite the party preferencing most incumbents last, the party still directed its preferences to the Nationals in regional and rural electorates. In Queensland, the party preferenced the Liberal National Party over Labor and the Greens in all but four electorates: Dickson, Griffith, Groom and McPherson. The party preferenced incumbents last in all Western Australian seats. Palmer claimed that he preferenced the Liberals above Labor in 55% of seats and Labor above the Liberals in 45% of seats.

At the 2022 election, Kelly lost his seat of Hughes, and the UAP failed to win any seats in the House of Representatives, and only won a single seat in the Senate, despite an estimated $100 million advertising campaign.

=== 2022 deregistration ===
On 8 September 2022, the UAP was voluntarily deregistered as a party. Ralph Babet, the party's sole senator, told media the deregistration was for "administrative reasons" and that the party will "reestablish before the next election". Babet is able to continue identifying as a United Australia Party member in the Senate, with the office of the Clerk of the Senate stating that Babet’s status as a UAP senator would not change until he advised the office it had.

In February 2025, the High Court ruled that Palmer cannot register the UAP again for the 2025 federal election. Following this ruling, Palmer announced he had joined the Trumpet of Patriots and had become Chairman of the party in order to contest the election.

=== 2026 revival ===
After failing to win any seats during the 2025 federal election, Palmer left the Trumpet of Patriots and announced the revival of the United Australia Party ahead of the 2028 federal election. The party's re-registration was approved by the AEC on 18 March 2026.

== State and territory politics ==
=== New South Wales ===
The United Australia Party has never been registered in New South Wales.

At the 2023 state election, the United Australia Party endorsed nine candidates (including party leader Craig Kelly) for the Legislative Council as "Group B" due to the party being unregistered in New South Wales. No candidates from this group were elected.

=== Northern Territory ===
In April 2014, three independent members of the Northern Territory Legislative Assembly – Alison Anderson, Larisa Lee, and Francis Xavier Kurrupuwu – joined Palmer United, with Anderson becoming the party's leader in the Territory. The trio had resigned from the ruling Country Liberal Party (CLP) during the previous month, leaving the CLP with a one-seat majority in the unicameral Northern Territory Parliament. After the MPs joined Palmer United, Campbell Newman, the Premier of Queensland, suggested Clive Palmer was attempting to "buy votes", which resulted in Palmer initiating defamation proceedings against Newman. The PUP is not registered with the Northern Territory Electoral Commission, but the party already meets the NTEC's eligibility requirements for registration because it is "registered under the Commonwealth Electoral Act". However, Francis Xavier resigned from the party to rejoin the CLP in September 2014, and Lee and Anderson resigned to become Independents in November.

=== Queensland ===
The United Australia Party (UAP) was registered with the Electoral Commission of Queensland (ECQ) on 5 June 2013. Alex Douglas and Carl Judge, the members for Gaven and Yeerongpilly, respectively, in the Queensland Legislative Assembly, joined the party the following day, having announced their intention to join the week before. Both had been elected as Liberal National Party MPs at the 2012 state election, but fell out with the LNP and resigned from the party later that year, sitting as independents in the interim. The party remained registered with the ECQ under the United Australia Party name until 28 February 2014, when its registration was updated to reflect the change to Palmer United Party. The proposed name change had been announced late the previous year, with Douglas announcing it in parliament on 20 November 2013. Douglas quit the party and sat as an independent from August 2014, and Judge followed suit two months later.

PUP contested its first Queensland state election in 2015. Its state leader was John Bjelke-Petersen, son of former Queensland Premier Joh Bjelke-Petersen. PUP had a poor run-up to the election; although actively stopping a number of federal education and health reforms in the Senate, Lambie's decision to leave the party following the departure of Carl Judge and Alex Douglas at the state level, gave an impression that the party was in disarray. This was reflected in the pre-election polling that had PUP at less than 4%. To complicate matters, Clive Palmer was sick during much of the campaign, missing the election launch. This left the inexperienced Bjelke-Petersen to do most of the electioneering. Despite these difficulties, PUP managed to field 50 candidates out of a possible 89 electoral districts in Queensland. PUP policies included: a First Farm Buyers Grant; to abolish payroll tax for businesses and; tighter regulation of coal seam gas operations. The PUP received 5.1% of first preference votes. While counting was underway, the PUP candidate for Ferny Grove, Mark Taverner, was revealed to be an undischarged bankrupt. Under Australian electoral law, Taverner was ineligible to run. This led to speculation that a by-election would be required in the seat; Labor was narrowly ahead on the two-party vote, and Taverner had preferenced Labor. However, the final tally showed that Taverner's votes had no bearing on the outcome, so a by-election was not required.

On 23 September 2016, The PUP applied for deregistration in Queensland, effectively terminating its operation in that state. A party spokesperson stated that the party was set up as and would remain a federal party, but no longer contest state elections.

The party ran in the Queensland state election in 2020, it only got 0.62% of the vote. It didn't run in the Queensland state election in 2024.

=== South Australia ===
Two independent candidates at the 2014 South Australian state election were endorsed by Palmer United. Ngoc Chau Huynh and Kristian Rees (a former soccer player who finished his career at the then Clive Palmer-owned Gold Coast United) ran on a combined ticket for the Legislative Council, and polled 1.6 percent without either being elected. The party had failed to achieve registration by the required date, with the election held on the same date as the Tasmanian state election.

The party has never run in a state election in South Australia.

=== Tasmania ===
After an appeal against the party's registration was dismissed in the Supreme Court of Tasmania, Palmer United was registered with the Tasmanian Electoral Commission (TEC) on 17 February 2014, and was one of seven parties to contest the March 2014 state election. The party polled 4.97 percent of first-preference votes in the House of Assembly, but did not win a seat. It achieved its best result in the Division of Braddon, where its candidates polled 7.18 percent to finish ahead of the Tasmanian Greens, and third overall, behind the Liberals and Labor. Kevin Morgan, a former public servant who stood in Braddon, was the party's leader during the election, while Barbara Etter, the former CEO of the Integrity Commission Tasmania and a former assistant commissioner of Western Australia Police, was deputy leader, standing in Denison. Palmer United and the Liberals were subject to TEC investigations over claims they had breached electoral advertising rules by publishing the name and photos of opposing candidates without their permission. The party reportedly spent "more than $1 million on saturation advertising" during the campaign.

The party hasn't run in any Tasmanian state elections since then.

=== Victoria ===
The party ran in the 2014 Victorian state election, running candidates in the Victorian Legislative Council, the party won 66,679 votes, or 1.95% of the vote, they did not win any seats. In January 2015, unsuccessful Palmer United Party candidate Maria Rigoni petitioned the Supreme Court of Victoria to declare the 2014 election invalid, alleging that the Victorian Electoral Commission had breached the Electoral Act whilst conducting the election. Rigoni argued that the unprecedented high level of early voting demonstrated that the VEC had not applied or enforced the rule requiring applicants for an early or postal votes to declare a valid reason to an electoral officer that they were unable to vote on polling day.

In 2022, Clive Palmer announced that Geoff Shaw had become the party's Victorian leader.

The party ran in the 2022 Victorian state election, running candidates in the Victorian Legislative Council, the party won 31,043 votes, or 0.83% of the vote, they did not win any seats. Victoria is the only state where the party is still registered.

=== Western Australia ===
Palmer, in the midst of a court case against Western Australian Premier Mark McGowan, announced his party would not contest the 2021 state election. The party has never run in a state election in Western Australia.

== Policies ==
The party's policies are, as of 18 September 2021:

- Lockdowns: it is against lockdowns and for the re-opening of borders, stating that the country's Constitution provides for the "absolutely free" movement of people within Australia.
- Domestic vaccine passports: the UAP is against vaccine passports.
- The doctor-patient relationship: the UAP "believes in the sanctity of the doctor-patient relationship" and medical privacy. It says that alternative treatments which have shown success overseas "must be included in the treatment options and available for all Australians."
- National Cabinet: the UAP states that the National Cabinet has no legal basis and should be abolished quickly.
- Energy: the UAP supports the use of nuclear power and further research into the generation of electricity from this source.
- Defence: it is in favour of matching of other regional countries' nuclear fleet with Australia's own. It stresses the use of the defence budget for defence purposes only.
- Free speech and "foreign tech giants": the UAP says that companies such as Facebook and Twitter "should not be able to censor Australian political debate" and seeks to legislate to prevent this.
- "Australian values": the party stresses that "the most basic freedoms of parliamentary democracy - freedom of speech, freedom of religion, freedom from fear, and freedom of association" must be protected.
- Zonal taxation: it advocates a "20% tax concession incentive" in rural areas to stimulate economic growth there and reduce the impact of congestion and overcrowding in cities.
- Resource industry: the UAP says that there should be more onshore minerals processing, that more stages of the mining process should happen in Australia.

=== "New deal" ===
In March 2026, Palmer announced a new policy platform for the UAP titled "new deal", which will include:

- Increasing the pension by 30 percent
- Doubling the health budget
- $1 trillion allocated for housing and infrastructure
- Scrapping the net-zero emissions by 2050 target
- A 25 percent levy on iron ore and gas exports

== Leaders ==
=== Federal ===
No.	Image	Name	Term start	Term end	Office	Notes
1		Clive Palmer (b. 1954)	April 2013	23 August 2021	MP for Fairfax (2013−2016)	
2		Craig Kelly (b. 1963)	23 August 2021	27 February 2024	MP for Hughes (2010−2022)	Left party joined One Nation
(1)		Clive Palmer (b. 1954)	19 February 2025		MP for Fairfax (2013−2016)	

=== Senate ===
No.	Image	Name	Term start	Term end	Office	Notes
1		Glenn Lazarus (b. 1965)	16 October 2013	12 March 2015	Senator for Queensland (2014−2016)	Left party formed Glenn Lazarus Team
2		Brian Burston (b. 1948)	18 June 2018	30 June 2019	Senator for New South Wales (2016−2019)	
3		Ralph Babet (b. 1983)	27 February 2024	incumbent	Senator for Victoria (2022−)	

=== Queensland ===
No.	Image	Name	Term start	Term end	Office	Notes
1		Glenn Lazarus (b. 1965)	1 April 2013	30 April 2013	Senator for Queensland (2014−2016)	
2		Alex Douglas (b. 1948)	30 April 2013	11 August 2014	MP for Gaven (2009−2015)	
3		Carl Judge (b. 1968)	11 August 2014	8 October 2014	MP for Yeerongpilly (2012−2015)	
4		John Bjelke-Petersen (b. 1957)	28 December 2014	31 January 2015		
5		Greg Dowling (b. 1963)	10 January 2020	31 October 2020		

=== Northern Territory ===
No.	Image	Name	Term start	Term end	Office	Notes
1		Alison Anderson (b. 1958)	28 April 2014	29 November 2014	MP for Namatjira (2012−2016)	

=== Western Australia ===
No.	Image	Name	Term start	Term end	Office	Notes
1		Dio Wang (b. 1981)	1 April 2013	12 March 2015	Senator for Western Australia (2014−2016)	

=== Victoria ===
No.	Image	Name	Term start	Term end	Office	Notes
1		Ricky Muir (b. 1980)	1 July 2014	2 July 2016	Senator for Victoria (2014−2016)	
2		Geoff Shaw (b. 1967)	12 October 2022	26 November 2022	MP for Frankston (2010−2014)	

=== Tasmania ===
No.	Image	Name	Term start	Term end	Office	Notes
1		Jacqui Lambie (b. 1971)	1 April 2013	19 November 2014	Senator for Tasmania (2014−2017)	

== Representation in parliament ==
Below is a timeline of the representation of the party in federal, state and territory parliaments, including parliamentarians who were elected for the party or defected to it, as well as election losses and defections from the party. Overall, the party was at its strongest from July to August 2014, with 9 members across the House of Representatives, Senate, Northern Territory Legislative Assembly and Legislative Assembly of Queensland.

== Electoral results ==
=== Federal ===
House of Representatives
Election year	# of overall votes	% of overall vote	# of overall seats won	# of overall seats	+/–	Notes
2013	709,035	5.49 (#5)	1 / 150	1 / 150	▲1	Crossbench
2016 (D-D)	315	▼0.00 (#50)	0 / 150	0 / 150	▼1	Extra-parliamentary
2019	488,817	▲3.43 (#6)	0 / 151	0 / 151	Steady	Extra-parliamentary
2022	604,536	▲4.12 (#5)	0 / 151	0 / 151	Steady	Extra-parliamentary

Senate
Election year	# of overall votes	% of overall vote	# of overall seats won	# of overall seats	+/–	Notes
2013	658,976	4.91 (#4)	3 / 40	3 / 76	▲3	Crossbench
2016 (D-D)	26,230	▼0.19 (#35)	0 / 76	0 / 76	▼3	Extra-parliamentary
2019	345,199	▲2.36 (#7)	0 / 40	0 / 76	Steady	Extra-parliamentary
2022	520,520	▲3.48 (#5)	1 / 40	1 / 76	▲1	Crossbench

==== Maps ====
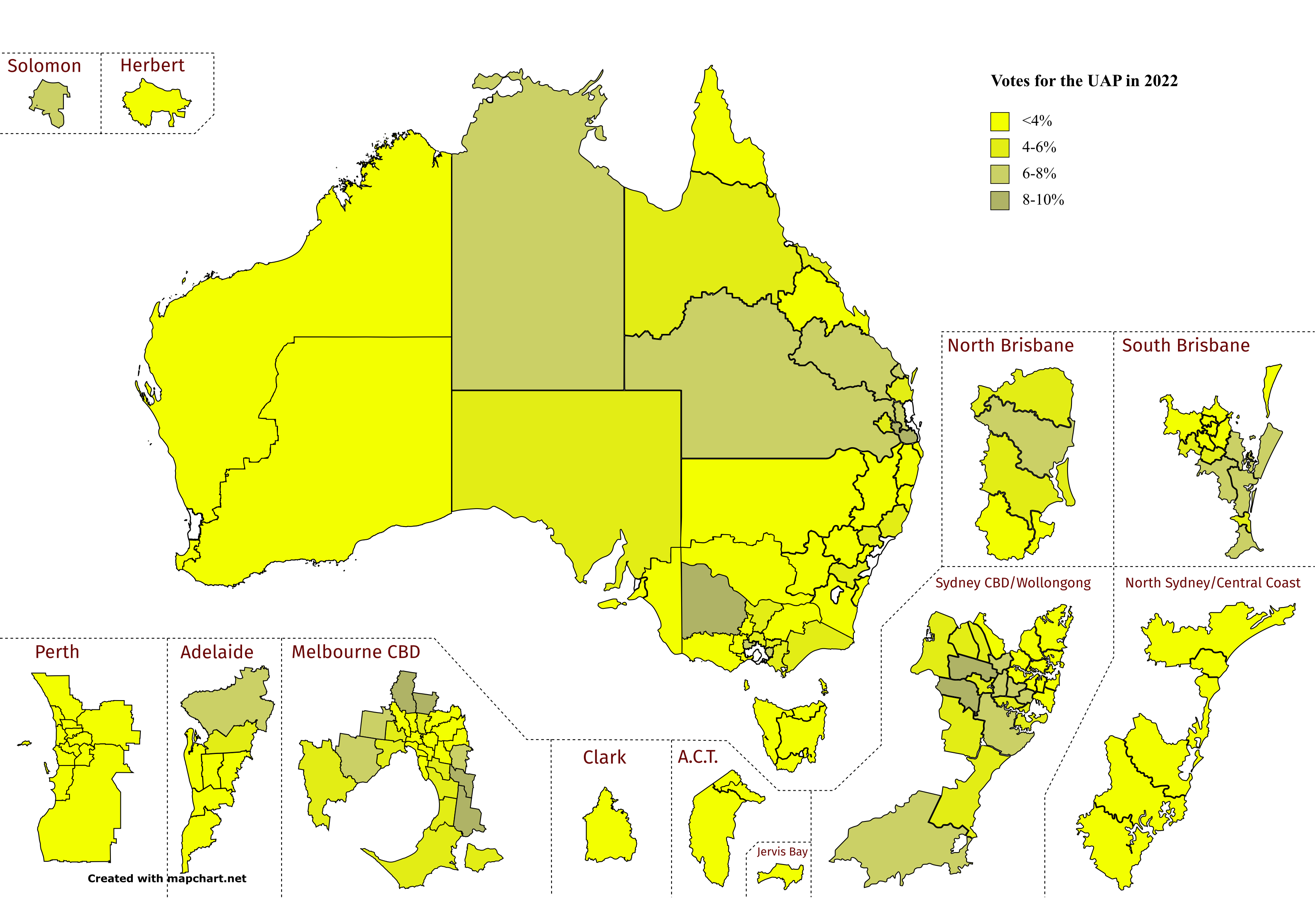
2022

=== New South Wales ===
Legislative Council
Election year	# of overall votes	% of overall vote	# of overall seats won	# of overall seats	+/–	Notes
2023	3,891	0.08 (#16)	0 / 21	0 / 42	Steady	Extra-parliamentary

=== Queensland ===
Legislative Assembly
Election year	# of overall votes	% of overall vote	# of overall seats won	# of overall seats	+/–	Notes
2020	17,904	0.62 (#7)	0 / 93	0 / 93	Steady	Extra-parliamentary

=== South Australia ===
Legislative Council
Election year	# of overall votes	% of overall vote	# of overall seats won	# of overall seats	+/–	Notes
2014	16,603	0.0 (#6)	0 / 11	0 / 22	Steady	Extra-parliamentary

=== Tasmania ===
House of Assembly
Election year	# of overall votes	% of overall vote	# of overall seats won	# of overall seats	+/–	Notes
2014	16,198	4.97 (#4)	0 / 25	0 / 25	Steady	Extra-parliamentary

=== Victoria ===
Legislative Council
Election year	# of overall votes	% of overall vote	# of overall seats won	# of overall seats	+/–	Notes
2014	66,728	1.95 (#7)	0 / 40	0 / 40	Steady	Extra-parliamentary
2018	Did not contest					
2022	3,382	0.83 (#16)	0 / 40	0 / 40	Steady	Extra-parliamentary

== See also ==
- United Australia Party (2013) politicians
- List of political parties in Australia
- Australian Motoring Enthusiast Party
- Pauline's United Australia Party
- Personalist party
