= Anne McEwen (politician) =

Australian politician

Anne McEwen OAM
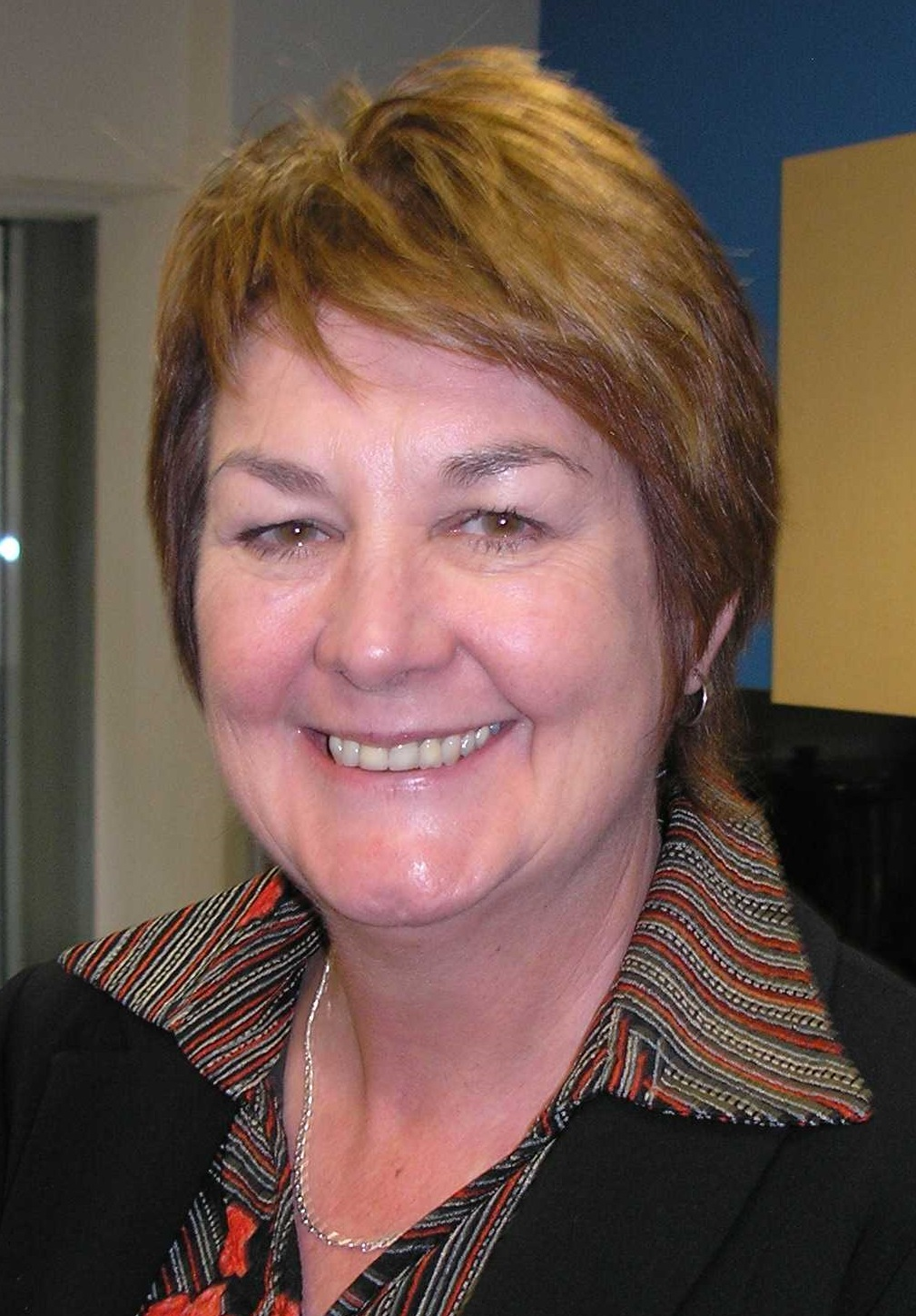

Chief Government Whip in the Senate
- In office 27 September 2010 – 18 September 2013
- Prime Minister: Julia Gillard; Kevin Rudd
- Preceded by: Kerry O'Brien
- Succeeded by: Helen Kroger

Senator for South Australia
- In office 1 July 2005 – 2 July 2016
- Succeeded by: Don Farrell

Personal details
- Born: 3 August 1953 (age 73) Adelaide, South Australia
- Party: Australian Labor Party
- Education: University of Adelaide

Anne McEwen OAM (born 3 August 1954) is a former Australian politician who served as a Labor member of the Australian Senate for South Australia from 2005 to 2016.

== Early life ==
McEwen was born in Adelaide, South Australia, and attended St Joseph's Primary School Hectorville, and St Aloysius College in the city. The daughter of a school teacher mother and an accountant father, after leaving school McEwen went on to work in clerical and administrative positions within both the private and public sectors.

During the 1980s, McEwen undertook tertiary study as a mature age entry student at the University of Adelaide, graduating in 1987 with a Bachelor of Arts degree with majors in politics and English literature. In her spare time, McEwen enjoys trekking and bushwalking.

== Background ==
In the late 1980s, while working in administration within the Students' Association of the University of Adelaide, McEwen became a workplace delegate for her union, the Federated Clerks' Union. After a brief period of working for the National Tertiary Education Union, McEwen joined the Federated Clerks' Union (later to merge into the Australian Services Union) as an Industrial Officer/Organiser in 1993. In 2002, McEwen was elected Secretary of the South Australian and Northern Territory branch of the Australian Services Union (ASU). In 2003, McEwen was awarded the Centenary Medal for her services to trade unionism as the Secretary of the ASU SA+NT.

In 2005, McEwen became President of the South Australian branch of the Australian Labor Party (ALP).

== Parliament ==
McEwen was elected Senator for South Australia at the 2004 election, replacing retiring senator Nick Bolkus. Her term in the Senate began on 1 July 2005, and she was re-elected for a second term in the 2010 federal election.

McEwen made her maiden speech to the Senate on 9 August 2005. Previously holding positions such as the Chief Government Whip in the Senate and Chair of the Environment, Communications and the Arts (Legislation) Senate Committee, following the 2013 federal election McEwen became the Chief Opposition Whip in the Senate. She was also a full member on the Joint Standing Committee of Foreign Affairs, Defence and Trade and the Senate Foreign Affairs, Defence and Trade Committee, as well as a participating member on a number of other Senate committees. McEwen was also a member of a number of Parliamentary groups, including the Parliamentary Group on Population and Development, and she was Secretary of the Australia/Papua New Guinea Parliamentary Friendship Group.

During her time in Federal Parliament, McEwen was particularly active on issues regarding workplace relations, higher education, Australia's indigenous population, and veterans' affairs. Until the 2016 election, McEwen was the duty senator for the federal electorates of Sturt and Barker in South Australia.

Party political offices
Preceded by Kerry O'Brien	Chief Government Whip in the Senate; 2010–2013	Succeeded by Helen Kroger
Preceded by Helen Kroger	Chief Opposition Whip in the Senate; 2013–2016	Succeeded by Anne Urquhart
