= Australian Fishing and Lifestyle Party =

- Founded: 2006
- Registered: 2007
- Dissolved: 8 December 2014
- Split from: Fishing Party

Website
- aflp.org.au

The Australian Fishing and Lifestyle Party (AFLP) was a minor Australian political party, formed in 2006 from the Queensland branch of the Fishing Party and federally registered in 2007. It opposes any bans on recreational fishing, the use of four-wheel drives, horse riding, trail bikes, camping and kayaking, and generally opposes conservation measures which it sees as threatening to recreation. The party's website indicates particular opposition to the Greens. It contested the Senate in the 2007 election in Queensland and South Australia, and on a joint ticket with the Shooters Party in New South Wales.

The party has been involved in Glenn Druery's Minor Party Alliance. Druery has also received regular payments from the Fishing and Lifestyle Party.

The party was voluntary deregistered on 8 December 2014.

== See also ==
- List of political parties in Australia
