= Advance Australia Party (2010) =

- Leader: Ray Brown
- Founded: 2010
- Registered: June 2010
- Dissolved: 2021

Website
- www.advanceaustraliaparty.org.au

The Advance Australia Party, formerly the Building Australia Party, was a minor political party in Australia, advocating the rights of the building industry. First registered in New South Wales, it achieved federal registration in June 2010, but was deregistered in May 2015. However, the party was still active for several years afterwards on a state level, sending out candidates for the New South Wales Hills Shire Council and Mayoral elections in 2017. The Advance Australia Party was deregistered on 13 August 2019.

The party was founded out of discontent with state and federal governments that push regulations which the founders of the Building Australia Party believe hold back the Australian building and building design industry. Its policies are centred on the building industry and housing affordability, but also include supporting a nurse-to-patient ratio in NSW and encouraging environmental sustainability.

At the 2010 federal election, the party nominated candidates for the Australian Senate in three states (New South Wales, Victoria, and South Australia), and also contested three House of Representatives seats: Bennelong, Greenway, and Macarthur, but did not receive enough votes to enter either house. It contested seats at the NSW State election in March 2011. The party contested at the 2013 federal election for senate seats in NSW, Victoria, Queensland, and South Australia, however they failed to win any seats.

The party is led by Raymond Brown, a building designer and the Past National President of the Building Designers Association of Australia. He has served as the Deputy Mayor of the Hills Shire Council and was a councillor between 1991 and 1995.

The party was involved in Glenn Druery's Minor Party Alliance (MPA) and the Alliance for Progress.

== See also ==
- Advance Australia Party (historical)
