= Online Direct Democracy =

Online Direct Democracy – (Empowering the People!)
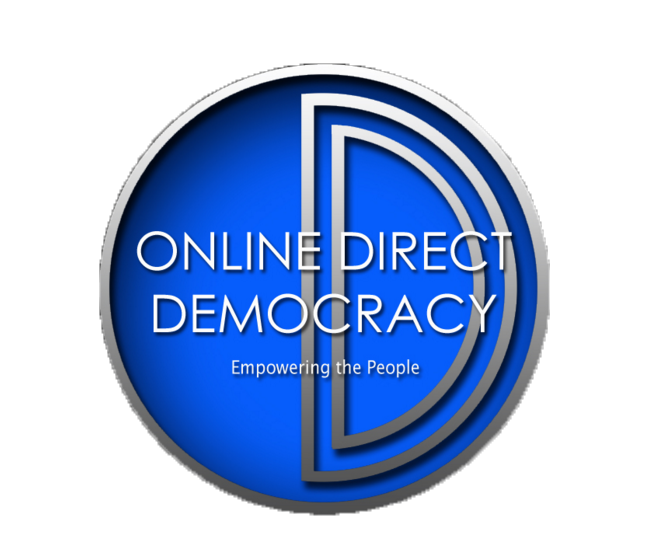
- Leader: Francois Crespel
- Founded: 2007; 19 years ago
- Preceded by: Senator Online (2007–2015); Online Direct Democracy (2015–2019); Climate Action! Immigration Action! Accountable Politicians! (2019–2019)
- Headquarters: Curl Curl, New South Wales
- Ideology: Electronic direct democracy

Online Direct Democracy – (Empowering the People!) was a registered Australian political party. It was briefly named Climate Action! Immigration Action! Accountable Politicians! from January 2019 to September 2019, and had previously been known as Senator Online. The party was de-registered in December 2020.

== Policies and philosophy ==
Online Direct Democracy did not have any policies. Instead it has pledged to conduct an online poll for every bill that passes before Parliament. Anyone on the Australian electoral roll would be allowed to register to vote in these polls and will be allowed one vote per bill. The MPs would then be required to vote in accordance with the clear majority (55%-70% and more than 100,000 votes). If there is no clear majority they will abstain from voting. A beta version of the system was operating and available for public use. This system was designed to highlight the possibilities of online democracy.

== History ==
The party contested the 2007 and 2013 federal elections as Senator Online. In the five states the party contested in 2007, it received on average 0.06% of the vote (or roughly 6 votes for every 10,000 cast) with the greatest success in Victoria where it received 0.18% of the vote (or roughly 18 votes for every 10,000 cast).

Senator Online changed its name in 2015 to Online Direct Democracy.

The party has been involved in Glenn Druery's Minor Party Alliance.

In the 2016 federal election Online Direct Democracy fielded two senate candidates in each of New South Wales and Queensland, one senate candidate in the Northern Territory, and House of Representatives candidates in six seats in New South Wales, two in Queensland, one in Western Australia and one in the Northern Territory.

The party changed its name again on 16 January 2019, in the leadup to the 2019 Australian federal election, to now be "Climate Action! Immigration Action! Accountable Politicians!". The party was renamed back to "Online Direct Democracy – (Empowering the People!)" in September 2019.

== See also ==
- Flux (political party)
- Pirate Party Australia
