= Australian Motoring Enthusiast Party =

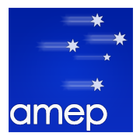
- Founded: 11 May 2013
- Registered: 9 July 2013
- Dissolved: 8 February 2017
- Headquarters: Level 5, Toowong Tower, 9 Sherwood Road, Toowong, Queensland
- Ideology: Single-issue party
- Colours: Blue
- Senate: 1 / 76 (2014–2016)

The Australian Motoring Enthusiast Party was a political party in Australia from 2013 to 2017. Ricky Muir held a seat for the party in the Australian Senate from 2013 to 2016. The party voluntarily de-registered with the Australian Electoral Commission (AEC) on 8 February 2017.

== History ==
The Australian Motoring Enthusiast Party (AMEP) was formed on 11 May 2013 in Queensland at a public meeting of motoring enthusiasts. The formation of the party followed moves by state governments, particularly in Queensland, to toughen anti-hooning and vehicle impoundment legislation.

The Australian Electoral Commission registered the party on 9 July 2013.

== Formation and structure ==
The AMEP's structure included State Councils and a Central Executive. The Queensland State Council and the Central Executive were formed when the party was established on 11 May 2013. At that point the Central Executive was made up of the Queensland State Council's office bearers.

The first Annual General Meeting of the AMEP was held on 11 July 2013. The Queensland State Council office bearers were returned as the Central Executive's office bearers.

The Victorian State Council was formed on 17 July 2013. The Western Australian State Council was formed on 23 July 2013. The New South Wales State Council was formed on 7 August 2013.

The Victorian State Council was suspended by the party's executive in October 2013 over claims that it had set up a Facebook page without permission and had engaged in what ABC News reported as being labelled "illegal and unauthorised use of AMEP identification, confidential information, incorrect policy announcements, and the misuse of the party brand". The former chairman of the Victorian State Council, Scott McDonald, told the ABC that it was unclear why the action had been taken.

== 2013 Federal election ==
The party endorsed Senate candidates in the 2013 Federal Election in New South Wales, South Australia, Queensland, Victoria and Western Australia. The party had been involved in Glenn Druery's Minor Party Alliance.

Ricky Muir represented AMEP in Victoria and won a seat in the senate after preference distribution from a record-low primary vote of 0.51 percent or 17,122 first preferences he assumed his seat on 1 July 2014.

On 10 October 2013 Muir announced he would enter into an alliance with the Palmer United Party.

Muir's senior adviser was electoral consultant Glenn Druery, but he was sacked by Muir less than a month later and was escorted out of Parliament. Muir stated that Druery did not "get along with the staff". Muir also hired former New South Wales state politician Peter Breen to advise him on legislation.

Muir lost his seat at the federal election held on 2 July 2016, leaving the AMEP without any representation in the federal parliament.

== See also ==
- Australian Motorist Party
