= Glenn Druery =

Australian political strategist

Chief of Staff for Fatima Payman
- In office 9 August 2024 – 4 August 2025

Chief of Staff for Ricky Muir
- In office 6 June 2014 – 1 August 2014

Personal details
- Party: Outdoor Recreation Party; Republic 2001; Liberals for Forests; Liberal Democrats; Justice Party; Motoring Enthusiast
- Occupation: Political strategist, ultra-distance cyclist

Glenn William Druery is an Australian political strategist, electoral campaigner and ultra-distance cyclist. He has played a leading role in the electoral success of various micro and minor parties in Australia since the mid-1990s.

He acquired a reputation through his Minor Party Alliance as the "preference whisperer" of Australian politics. He served as the chief of staff for Australia's Voice senator Fatima Payman from August 2024 until August 2025.

== Cycling ==
After overcoming a serious illness in his 30s, Druery competed in the Race Across America (RAAM) four times, in 2005, 2007, 2009 and 2012. In 2009 his four-man team, Team RANS, won the 5,000 km event in 6 days 3 hours and 40 minutes. During his 2012 RAAM Druery won his race category, generated media attention for victims of the HIV virus, especially in the third world and raised money for HIV research.

In 2003 and 2007 he participated in the 1,200 km Paris–Brest–Paris (PBP) cycling event.

== Politics ==
In 1996, Druery was instrumental in the formation of the Outdoor Recreation Party, and initiated a strategy to try to ensure the election of a party member to the New South Wales Legislative Council. This involved the manipulation of the party ticket system used to elect the Council from the single, statewide, multi-member electorate by single transferable vote. By encouraging, or even organising, many minor groups to contest the election, and ensuring an organised and disciplined allocation of preferences among them, candidates who only received a very small percentage of people's first-preference votes could be elected. This practice has become known as 'preference harvesting'.

Druery's scheme was first employed at the 1999 New South Wales Legislative Council election. 264 candidates from 81 different parties contested the election, which resulted in what became known as the "tablecloth ballot paper".

The NSW Legislative Council elects 21 members every four years, with a quota of 4.5 per cent of the vote. In 1999 the ballot paper had to accommodate 264 candidates and 81 parties. Druery played a key role in the election using his 'preference harvesting' strategy and supporting Malcolm Jones of the Outdoor Recreation Party. In the end Jones received preferences from 19 party tickets and won a seat, despite having attracted only 0.2 per cent of the primary vote.

Druery has been a candidate in several elections. He ran for the New South Wales Legislative Council in the 1999 and 2003 state elections, as a Liberals for Forests candidate for the Senate in the 2004 federal election, and as a Liberal Democrats candidate for the Senate in the 2010 federal election.

=== Minor Party Alliance ===
Druery formed the Minor Party Alliance (MPA) which helped more than 30 minor parties and independents with advice and guidance regarding the complex political and electoral processes required for the preference harvesting scheme to work. The preference harvesting deals organised by the Alliance for the 2013 Australian Senate election resulted in the election of candidates who received only 0.2 percent (Australian Sports Party), 0.5 percent (Australian Motoring Enthusiast Party) and 3.8 percent (Family First Party) of the first-preference votes. His successes in giving effect to his scheme at that and other elections has resulted in Druery being dubbed "the preference whisperer".

Druery became incoming Australian Motoring Enthusiast Party Senator Ricky Muir's senior adviser in July 2014, but was sacked by Muir less than a month later and escorted out of Parliament. Muir informed Druery by email that "You don't get along with the staff."

During a 2017 ABC report, Druery said he has a personal vendetta against Pauline Hanson's One Nation, saying he has been directing micro party preferences away from One Nation since 1999.

In late 2018, it was reported in The Age newspaper that Fiona Patten of the Reason Party had lodged a complaint with the Victorian Electoral Commission, stating that he had asked her party for an up-front fee of $5,000 to join his alliance of minor parties and to agree to a $50,000 fee for him for each member elected. In the complaint, Patten questioned whether Druery's cash-for-votes activities, as well as his activities as a taxpayer-funded adviser to Derryn Hinch, may violate state election laws. Victoria Police confirmed that the VEC had referred the matter to the crime command for assessment. Druery was never contacted by Victoria Police in regards to this matter and the matter was dismissed. Druery was later quoted in the Herald Sun as saying “it was a frivolous complaint that made Patten relevant as she faced political oblivion”. He also praised her “win at all costs attitude” saying Patten was one of his best students.

On 16 November 2022, Angry Victorians Party party leader Heston Russell leaked a video to the Herald Sun of him to talking to Glenn Druery about a potential preference deal, declaring that the AVP felt the co-ordination of the group voting ticket system used by Druery was immoral and needed to be exposed.

Druery's preference harvesting scheme was finally killed off when the Victorian Parliament abolished Group Ticket Voting for the Victorian Legislative Council (the last jurisdiction to use it) ahead of the 2026 Victorian state election.

=== Suspected misuse of Parliamentary travel entitlements for private benefit ===
In early 2021, The Age newspaper reported that Druery had "charged taxpayers more than $150,000 in travel and other expenses while working as Chief of Staff to then-senator Derryn Hinch" while "also running a lucrative cash-for-votes business in state elections". Druery's travel expenditure far exceeded that reported by crossbench Senators and Victorian backbenchers. Details of Druery's travel at taxpayer expense show that it coincided with meetings he organised to broker preferred deals as part of his "preference whispering" business. It is illegal for Parliamentary staffers to privately benefit from publicly funded travel. Druery resisted the release of the information regarding his travel and refused to provide comments about the issue to the media. Druery was never interviewed by police or parliamentary staff; he later said the matter was a beat-up by his political opponents.

=== Chief of staff role ===
In August 2024, Druery became the chief of staff for Labor-turned-Independent senator Fatima Payman, founder and leader of the Australia's Voice party.

== See also ==
- Politics of Australia
