= 2013 Australian House of Representatives election =

Australian federal election results, 2013

Australian House of Representatives elections, 2013
← 2010	7 September 2013	2016 →
- All 150 seats in the Australian House of Representatives; 76 seats needed for a majority
- Turnout: 93.2%
Party	Leader	Vote %	Seats	+/–
Liberal	Tony Abbott	32.0%	58	+14
Labor	Kevin Rudd	33.4%	55	−16
Liberal National	Campbell Newman	8.9%	22	+2
National	Warren Truss	4.3%	9	+2
Greens	Christine Milne	8.7%	1	0
Palmer United	Clive Palmer	5.5%	1	New
Katter's Australian	Bob Katter	1.0%	1	0
Country Liberal	Adam Giles	0.3%	1	0
National (WA)	Brendon Grylls	0.4%	0	−1
Independents	—	1.4%	2	−4
This lists parties that won seats. See the complete results below.
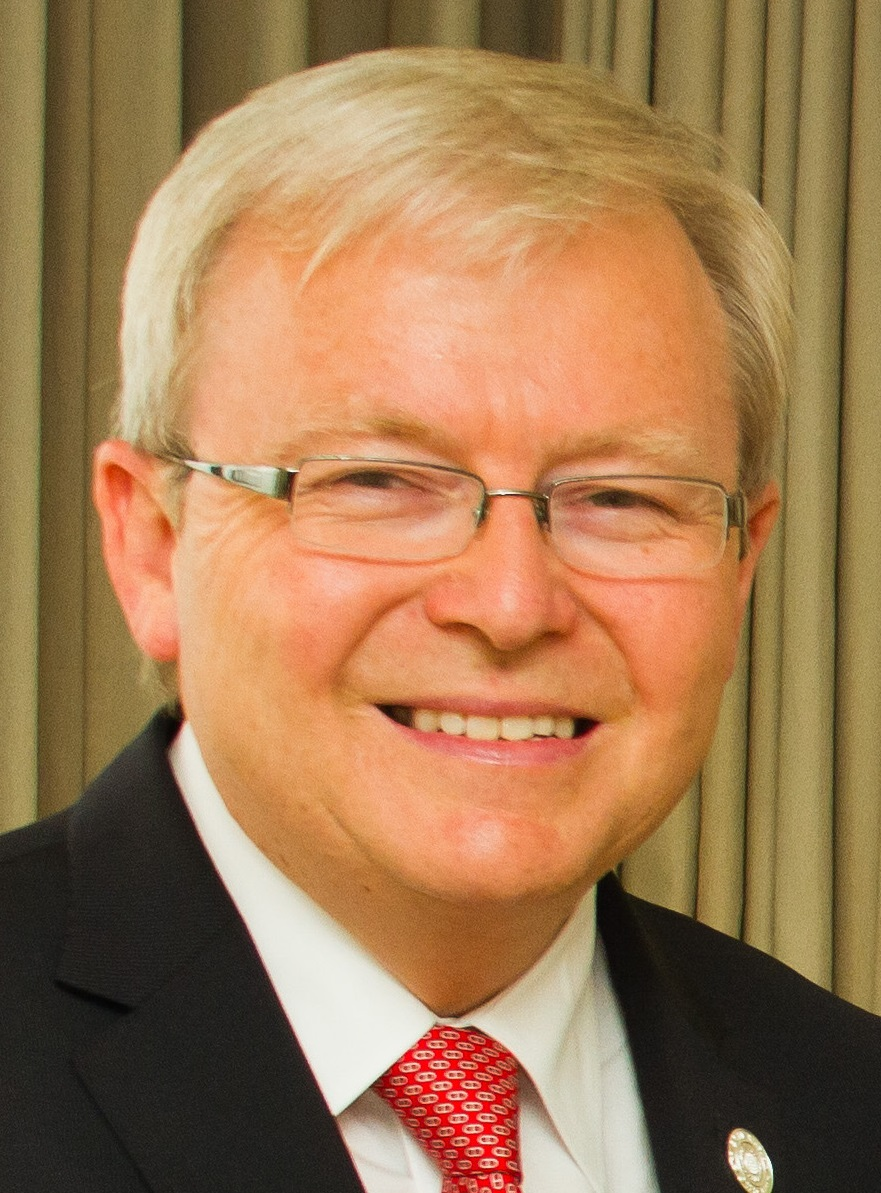

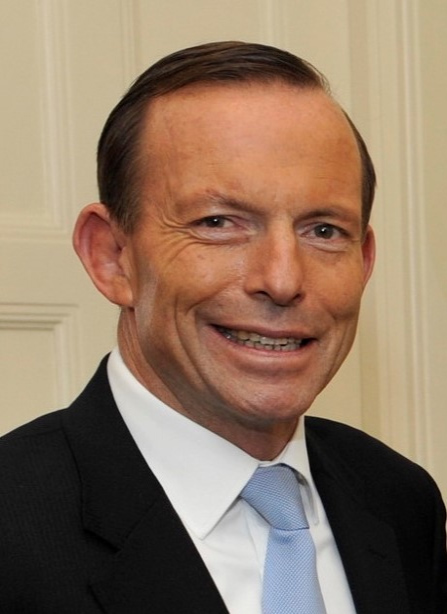
Prime Minister before	Prime Minister after
Kevin Rudd; Labor	Tony Abbott; Coalition

The following tables show state-by-state results in the Australian House of Representatives at the 2013 federal election, Coalition 90, Labor 55, Australian Greens 1, Palmer United Party 1, Katter's Australian Party 1, with 2 independents.

== Australia ==
Results by winning party by division for the House of Representatives.

Government (90) Coalition Liberal (58) LNP (22) National (9) CLP (1) Opposition (55) Labor (55) Crossbench (5) Green (1) Palmer (1) Katter (1) Independent (2)

House of Representatives (IRV) Turnout 93.23% (CV) — Informal 5.91%
Party	Votes	%	Swing	Seats	Change
Labor	4,311,365	33.38	−4.61	55	▼16
Coalition	5,882,818	45.55	+2.23	90	▲19
Liberal	4,134,865	32.02	+1.56	58	▲14
Liberal National	1,152,217	8.92	−0.20	22	▲2
National	554,268	4.29	+0.56	9	▲2
Country Liberal (NT)	41,468	0.32	+0.01	1	Steady
Greens	1,116,918	8.65	−3.11	1	Steady
Palmer United	709,035	5.49	+5.49	1	▲1
Family First	181,820	1.41	−0.84		
Katter's Australian	134,226	1.04	+0.73	1	▲1
Christian Democrats	88,576	0.69	+0.02		
Sex Party	78,571	0.61	+0.52		
Rise Up Australia	48,582	0.38	+0.38		
Australian Christians	42,498	0.33	+0.33		
Democratic Labour	36,086	0.28	+0.24		
One Nation	22,046	0.17	−0.05		
Bullet Train	19,801	0.15	+0.15		
Citizens Electoral Council	10,400	0.08	+0.02		
Australia First	7,412	0.06	+0.03		
Socialist Alliance	5,032	0.04	−0.04		
Secular	4,834	0.04	−0.06		
Liberal Democrats	4,716	0.04	−0.16		
Country Alliance	4,708	0.04	+0.04		
Australian Independents	4,163	0.03	+0.03		
Stable Population	3,954	0.03	+0.03		
Democrats	3,614	0.03	−0.15		
Animal Justice	1,878	0.01	+0.01		
First Nations	1,810	0.01	+0.01		
Australian Voice	1,681	0.01	+0.01		
Non-Custodial Parents	1,547	0.01	−0.01		
Australian Sports	1,324	0.01	+0.01		
Future	1,174	0.01	+0.01		
Protectionist	1,079	0.01	+0.01		
Voluntary Euthanasia	597	0.00	+0.00		
Uniting Australia	386	0.00	+0.00		
Senator Online	209	0.00	+0.00		
Independents	177,217	1.37	−1.15	2	▼4
Non Affiliated	4,850	0.04	+0.02		
Total	12,914,927			150	
Two-party-preferred vote
Liberal/National Coalition	6,908,710	53.49	+3.61	90	▲18
Labor	6,006,217	46.51	−3.61	55	▼17
Invalid/blank votes	811,143	5.91	+0.36		
Registered voters/turnout	14,723,385	93.23			
Source: Federal Election 2013

=== Preference flows ===
- Greens − Labor 83.0% (+4.2) to Coalition 17.0% (−4.2)
- Palmer − Coalition 53.7% to Labor 46.3%
- Family First − Coalition 58.3% (−1.5) to Labor 41.7% (+1.5)
- Katter − Coalition 54.0% to Labor 46.0%
- Independent candidates − Labor 57.1% (+13.6) to Coalition 42.9% (−13.6)

== New South Wales ==
2013 Australian federal election (New South Wales)
← 2010	7 September 2013	2016 →

All 48 New South Wales seats in the Australian House of Representatives and 6 (of the 12) seats in the Australian Senate
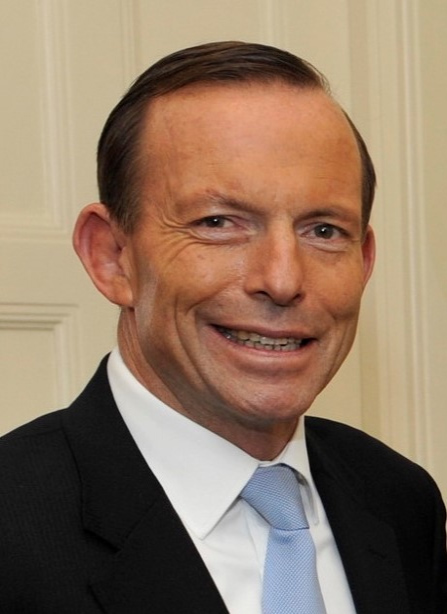

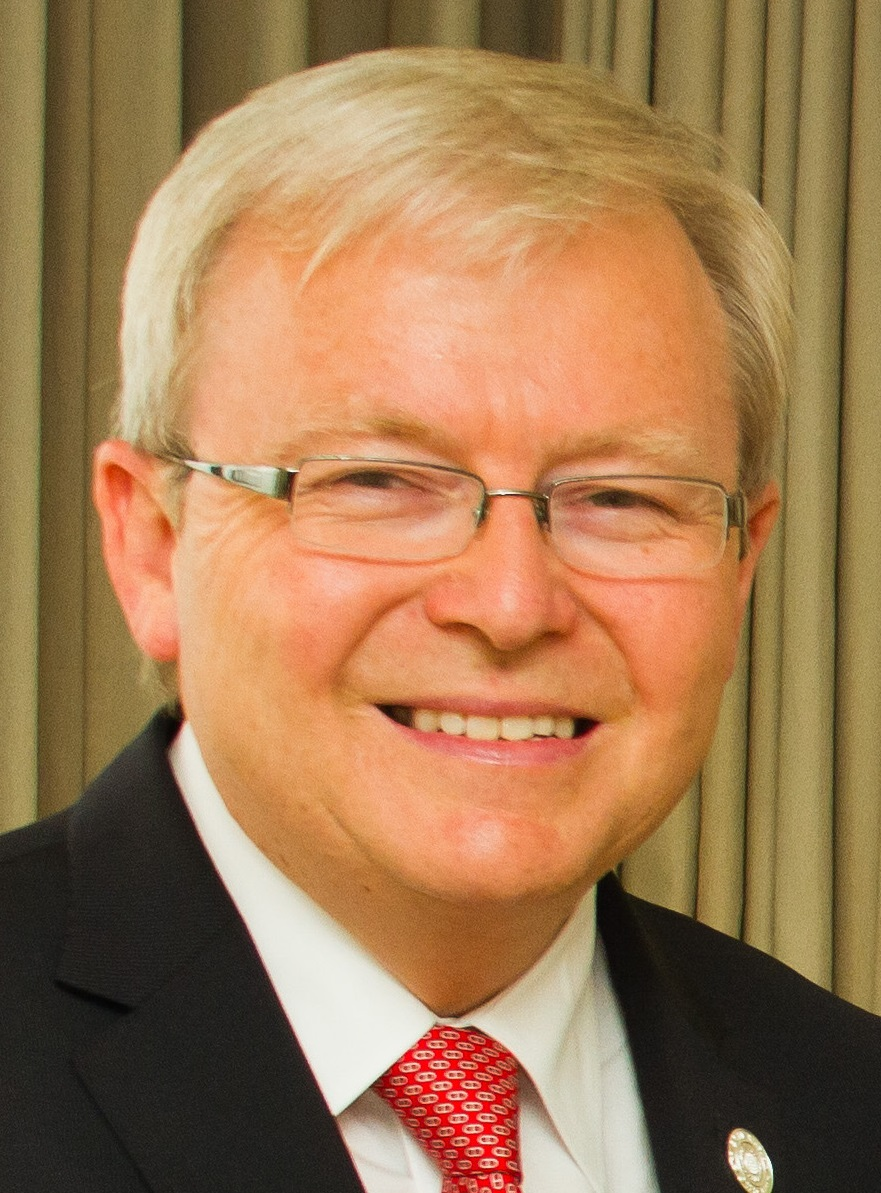
	First party	Second party
Leader	Tony Abbott	Kevin Rudd
Party	Liberal/National coalition	Labor
Last election	20 seats	26 seats
Seats won	30 seats	18 seats
Seat change	▲10	▼8
Popular vote	1,996,208	1,433,842
Percentage	47.34%	34.52%
Swing	▲2.74	▼2.76
TPP	54.35%	45.65%
TPP swing	▲3.19	▼3.19
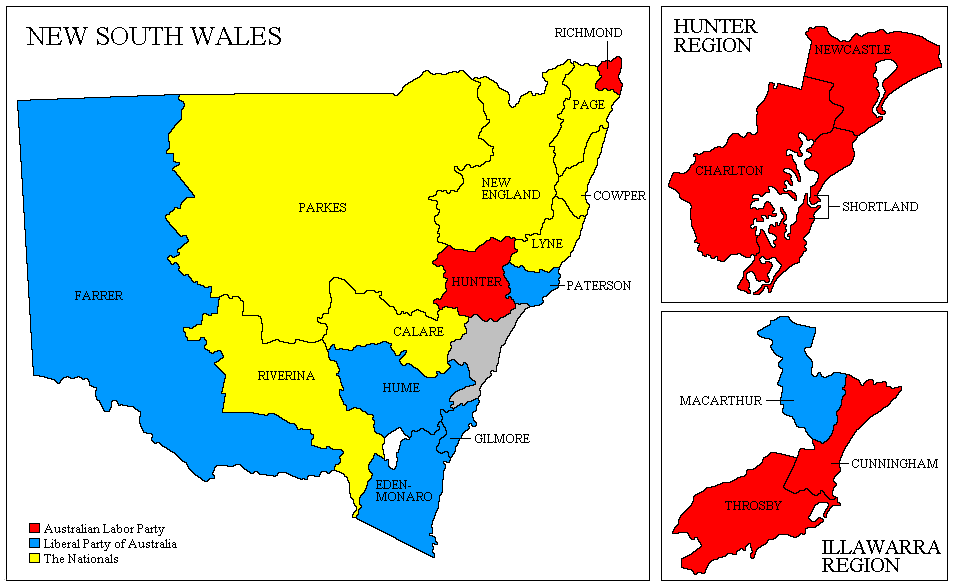
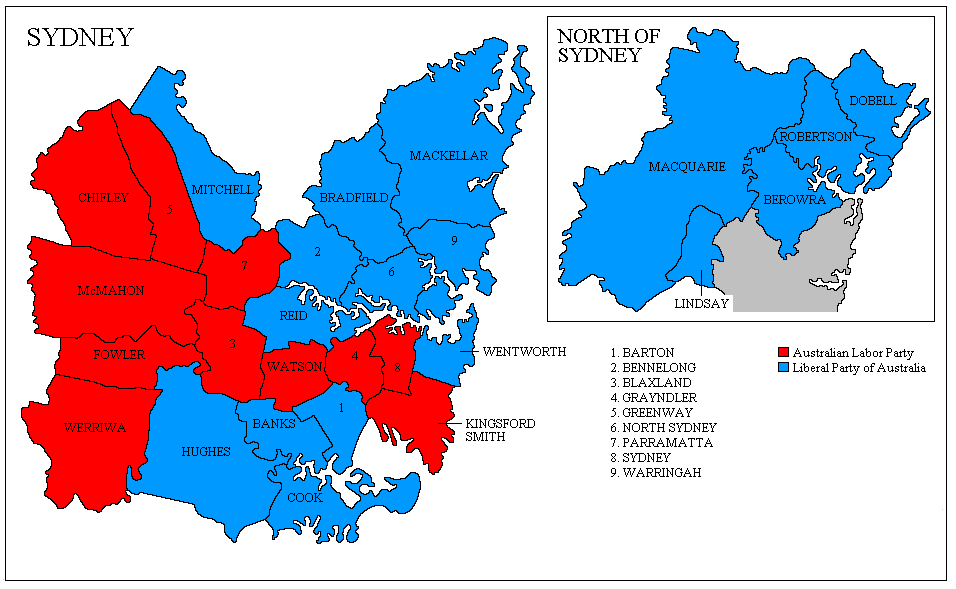

Turnout 93.33% (CV) — Informal 6.83%
Party	Votes	%	Swing	Seats	Change
Coalition					
Liberal	1,551,436	37.35	+0.68	23	▲7
National	414,772	9.99	+2.06	7	▲3
Labor	1,433,842	34.52	−2.76	18	▼8
Greens	330,050	7.95	–2.29		
Palmer United	174,551	4.20	+4.20		
Christian Democrats	88,576	2.13	+0.77		
One Nation	19,517	0.47	–0.01		
Democratic Labour	16,909	0.41	+0.41		
Katter's Australian	16,534	0.40	+0.40		
Bullet Train	8,174	0.20	+0.20		
Australia First	6,084	0.15	+0.07		
Rise Up Australia	5,449	0.13	+0.13		
Citizens Electoral Council	4,057	0.10	+0.07		
Sex Party	3,292	0.08	+0.00		
Stable Population	2,245	0.05	+0.05		
Australian Independents	2,092	0.05	+0.05		
Non-Custodial Parents	1,332	0.03	–0.04		
Socialist Alliance	1,229	0.03	–0.06		
Future	693	0.02	+0.02		
Secular	602	0.01	–0.08		
Australian Voice	545	0.01	+0.01		
Independents	71,848	1.73	−2.58	0	▼2
Total	4,153,829			48	
Two-party-preferred vote
Liberal/National Coalition	2,257,654	54.35	+3.19	30	▲10
Labor	1,896,175	45.65	–3.19	18	▼8

Labor to Liberal: Banks, Barton, Eden-Monaro, Lindsay, Reid, Robertson

Labor to National: Page

Independent to Liberal: Dobell (Labor at last election)

Independent to National: Lyne, New England

== Victoria ==
2013 Australian federal election (Victoria)
← 2010	7 September 2013	2016 →

All 37 Victorian seats in the Australian House of Representatives and 6 (of the 12) seats in the Australian Senate
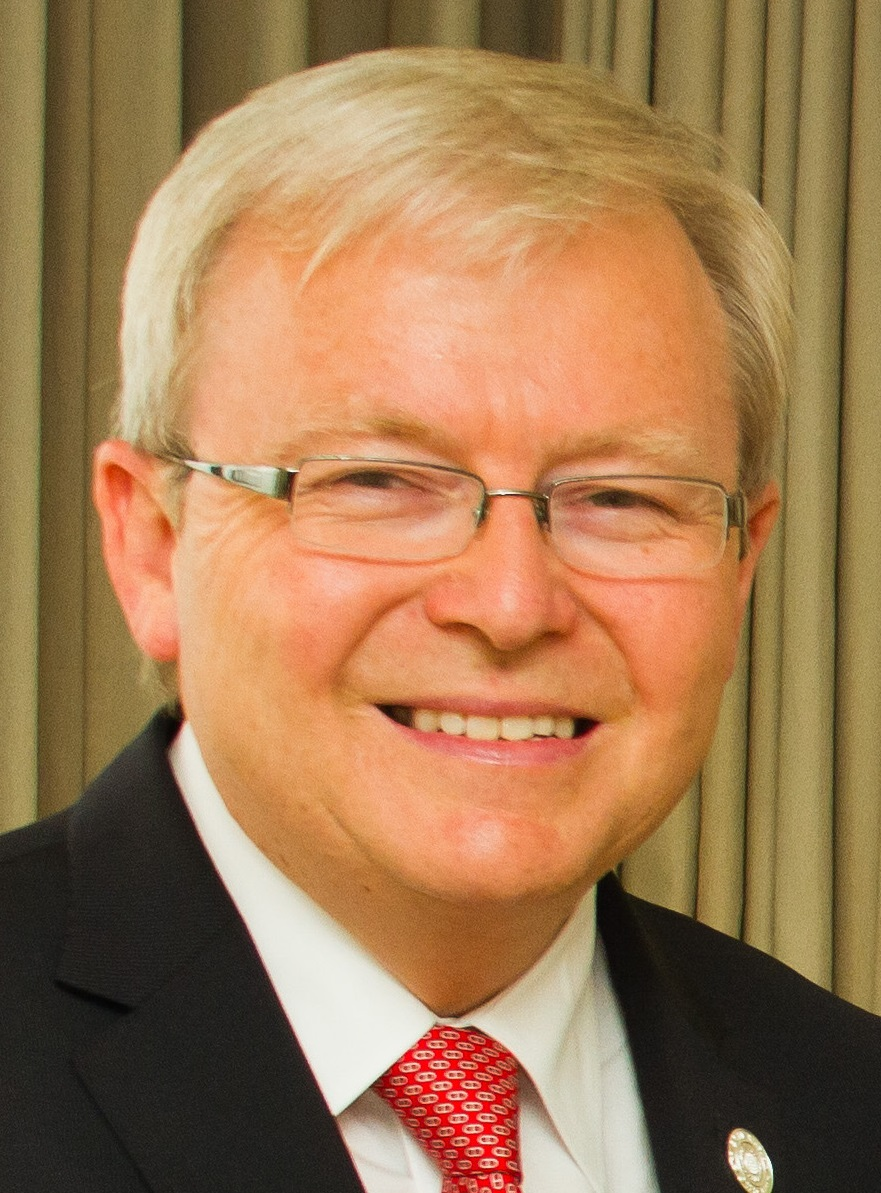

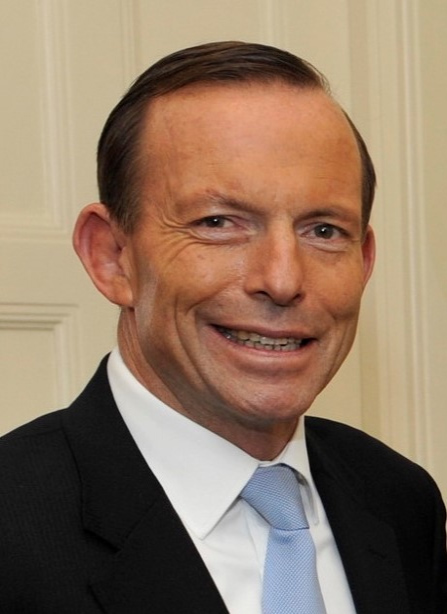

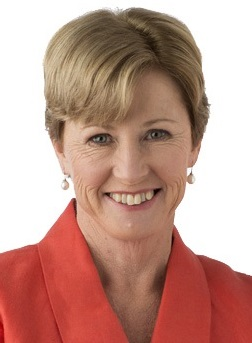
	First party	Second party	Third party
Leader	Kevin Rudd	Tony Abbott	Christine Milne
Party	Labor	Liberal/National coalition	Greens
Last election	22 seats	14 seats	1 seat
Seats won	19 seats	16 seats	1 seat
Seat change	▼3	▲2	Steady
Popular vote	1,146,894	1,406,462	355,698
Percentage	34.81%	42.69%	10.80%
Swing	▼8.00%	▲3.01%	▼1.86%
TPP	50.20%	49.80%
TPP swing	▼5.11	▲5.11
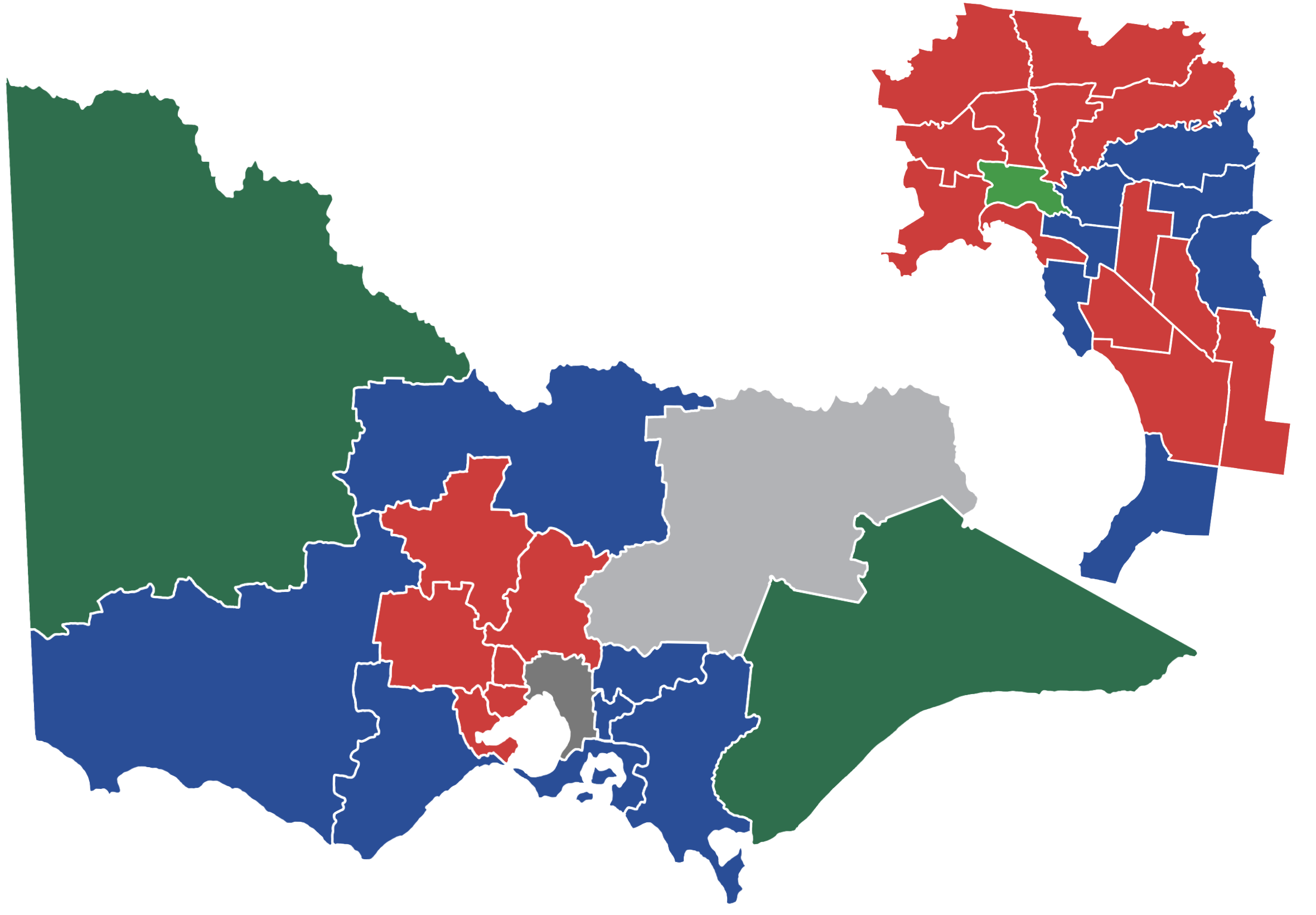
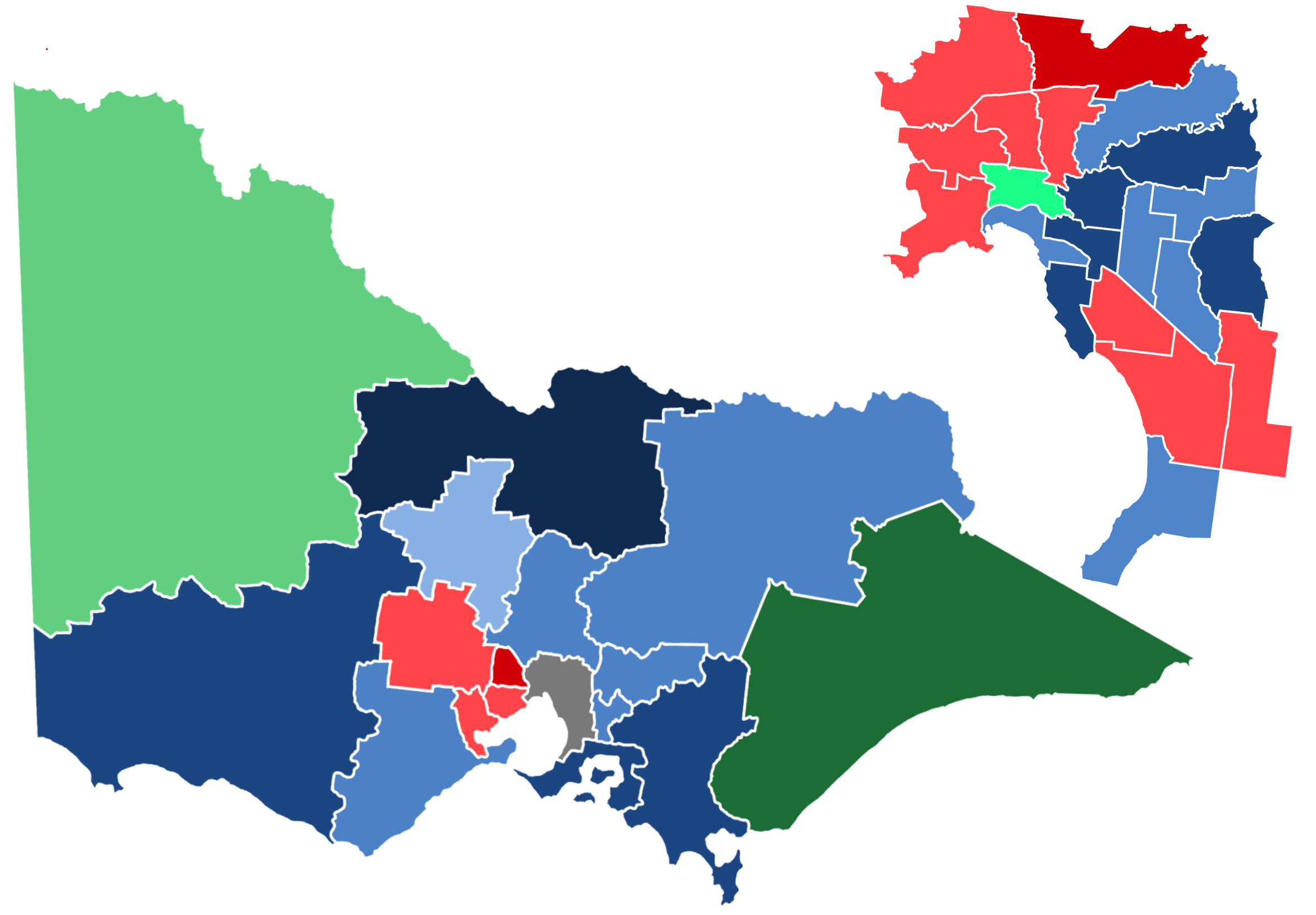
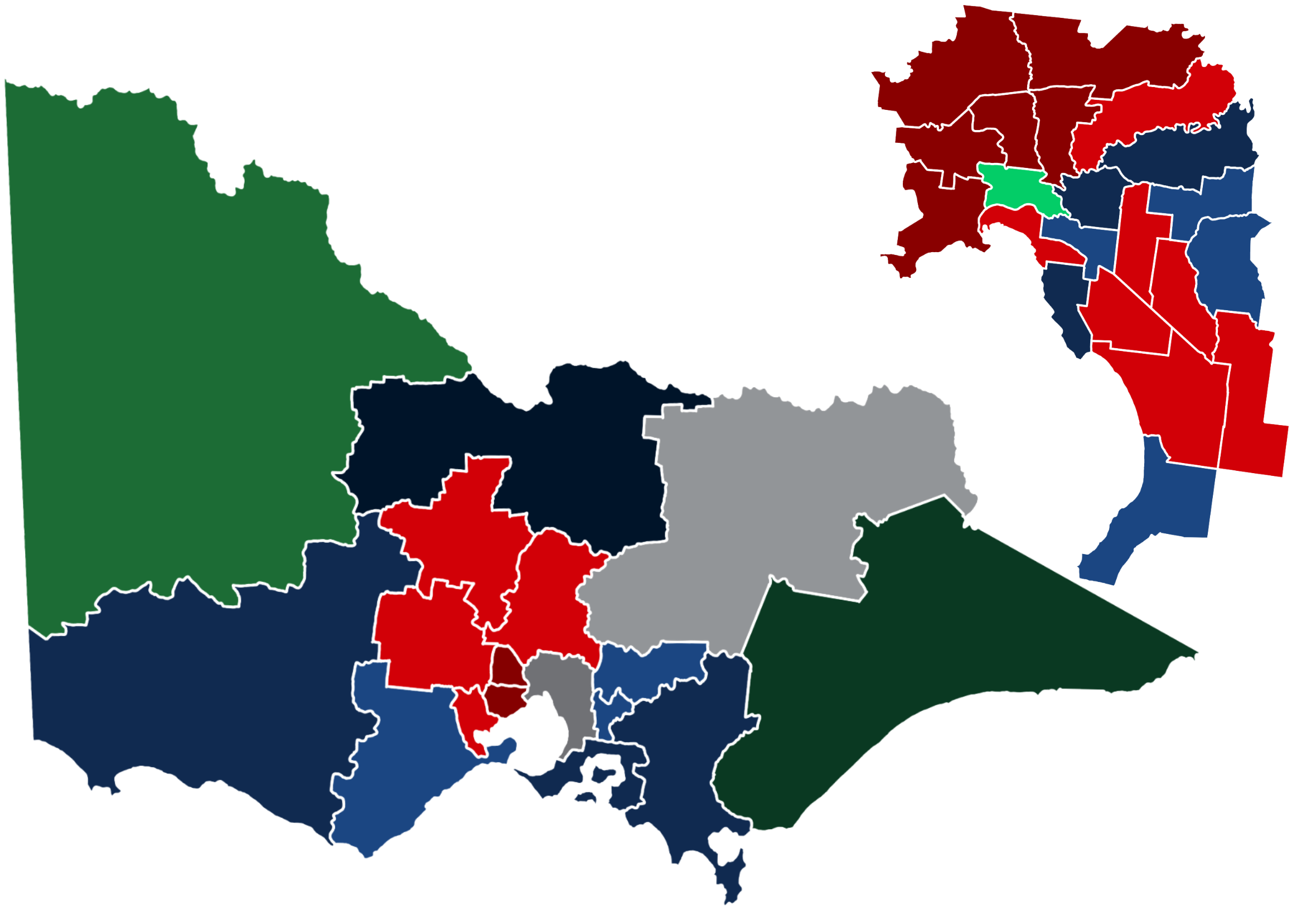

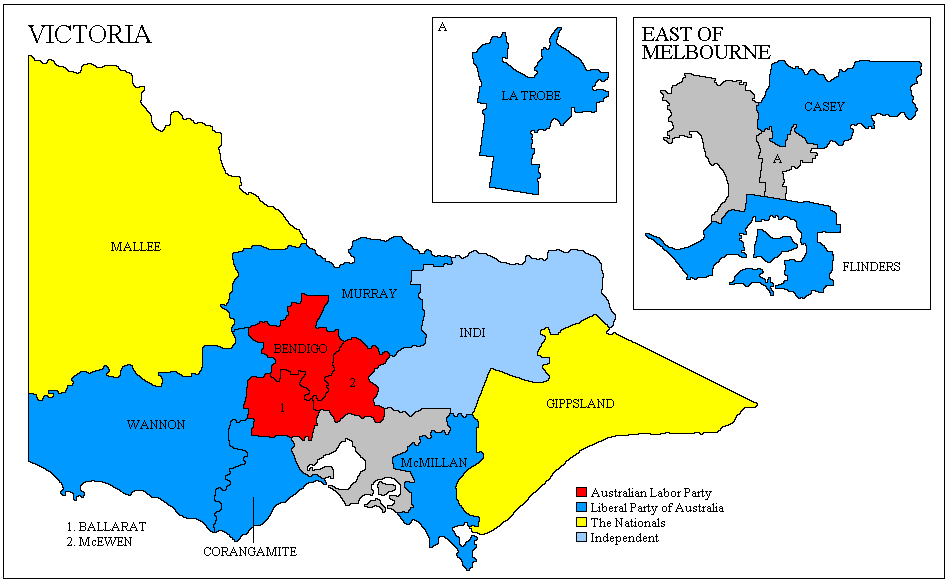
Electoral divisions: Victoria

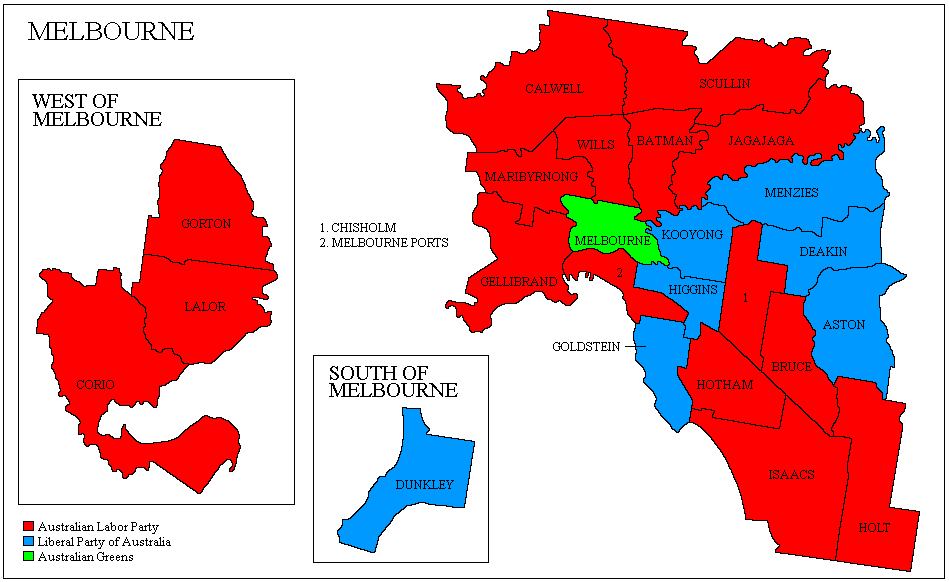
Electoral divisions: Melbourne area

Turnout 93.42% (CV) — Informal 5.19%
Party	Votes	%	Swing	Seats	Change
Coalition					
Liberal	1,320,417	40.08	+3.63	14	▲2
National	86,045	2.61	–0.58	2	Steady
Labor	1,146,894	34.81	–8.00	19	▼3
Greens	355,698	10.80	–1.86	1	Steady
Palmer United	119,623	3.63	+3.63		
Australian Sex Party	67,460	2.05	+1.86		
Family First	59,288	1.80	–1.34		
Rise Up Australia	18,124	0.55	+0.55		
Democratic Labour	16,714	0.51	+0.51		
Australian Christians	15,886	0.48	+0.48		
Katter's Australian	15,409	0.47	+0.47		
Liberal Democrats	4,716	0.14	–0.11		
Country Alliance	4,708	0.14	+0.14		
Animal Justice	1,878	0.06	+0.06		
Bullet Train	1,772	0.05	+0.05		
Socialist Alliance	1,703	0.05	–0.02		
Stable Population	856	0.03	+0.03		
Secular	776	0.02	–0.14		
Citizens Electoral Council	557	0.03	−0.01		
Non-Custodial Parents	215	0.01	+0.01		
Australia First	212	0.01	+0.00		
Senator Online	209	0.01	+0.01		
Australian Independents	170	0.01	+0.01		
Protectionist	156	0.00	+0.00		
Independents	53,307	1.62	+0.79	1	▲1
Non Affiliated	1,886	0.06	+0.04		
Total	3,294,659			37	
Two-party-preferred vote
Labor	1,653,977	50.20	−5.11	19	▼3
Liberal/National Coalition	1,640,682	49.80	+5.11	16	▲2

Independents: Cathy McGowan

Labor to Liberal: Corangamite, Deakin, La Trobe

Liberal to Independent: Indi

== Queensland ==
2013 Australian federal election (Queensland)
← 2010	7 September 2013	2016 →

All 30 Queensland seats in the Australian House of Representatives and 6 (of the 12) seats in the Australian Senate
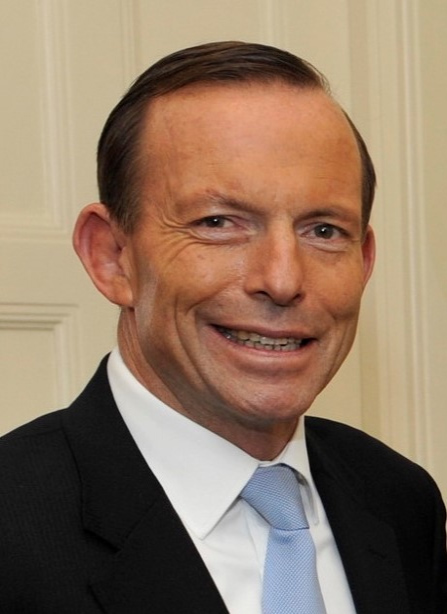

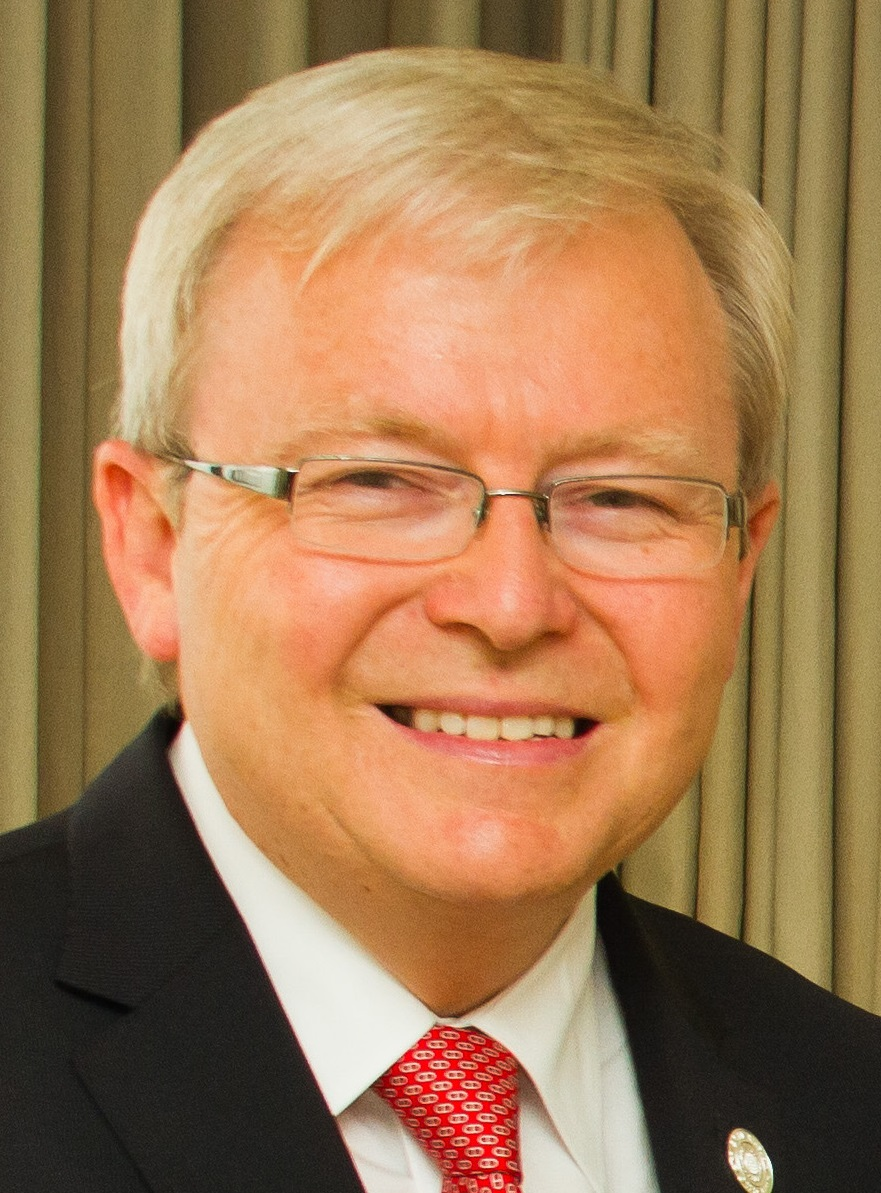

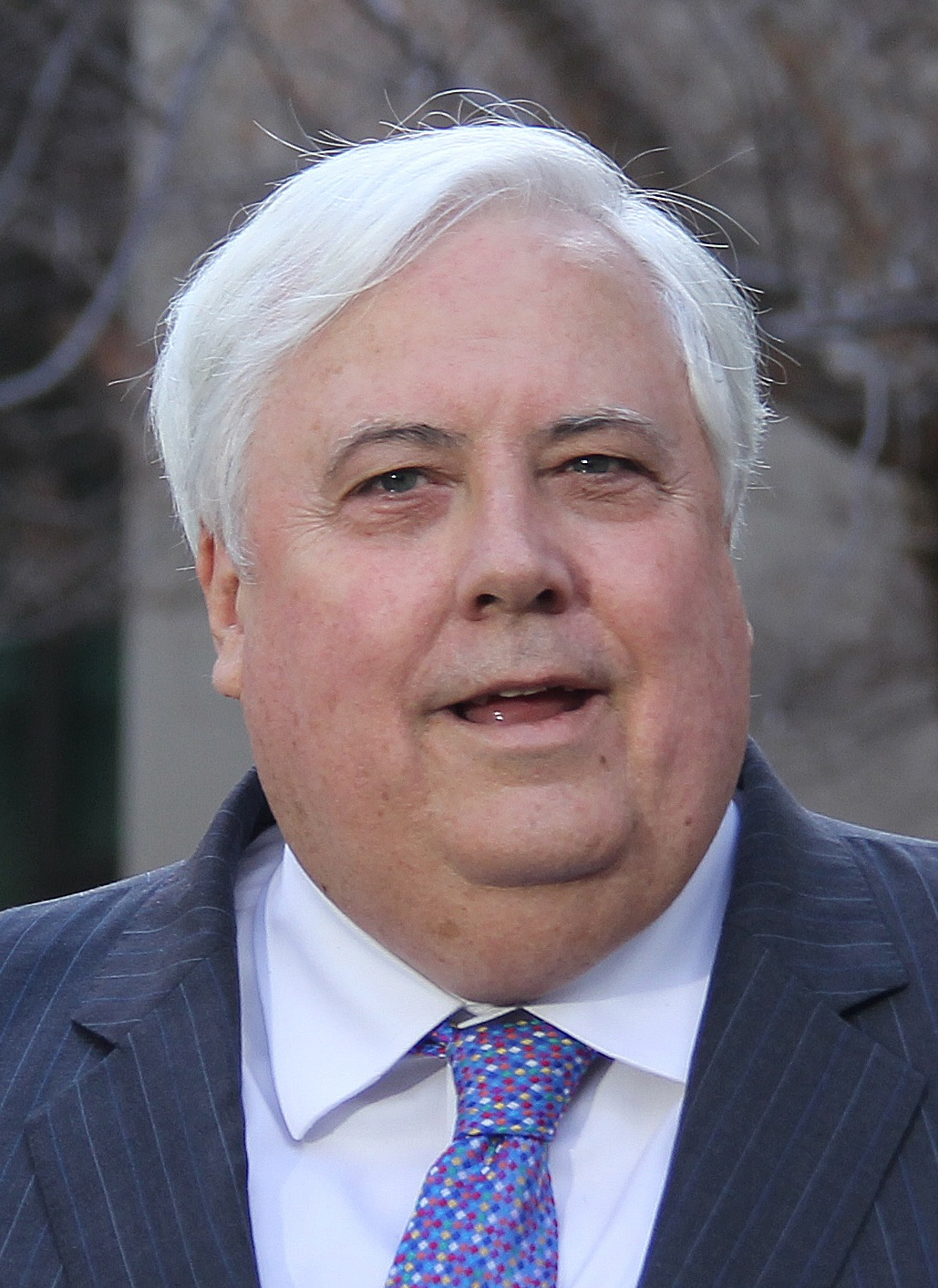

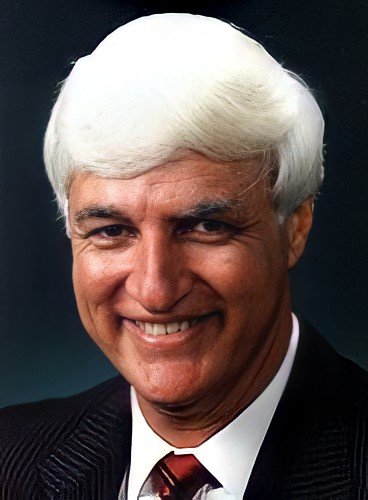
	First party	Second party
Leader	Tony Abbott	Kevin Rudd
Party	Coalition	Labor
Last election	21 seats	8 seats
Seats before	21	8
Seats won	22	6
Seat change	▲1	▼2
Popular vote	1,152,217	751,230
Percentage	45.66%	29.77%
Swing	▼1.76	▼3.81
TPP	56.98%	43.02%
TPP swing	▲1.84	▼1.84
	Third party	Fourth party
Leader	Clive Palmer	Bob Katter
Party	Palmer United	Katter's Australian
Last election	—	—
Seats before	0	1
Seats won	1	1
Seat change	▲1	Steady
Popular vote	278,125	94,540
Percentage	11.02%	3.75%
Swing	▲11.02	▲2.15
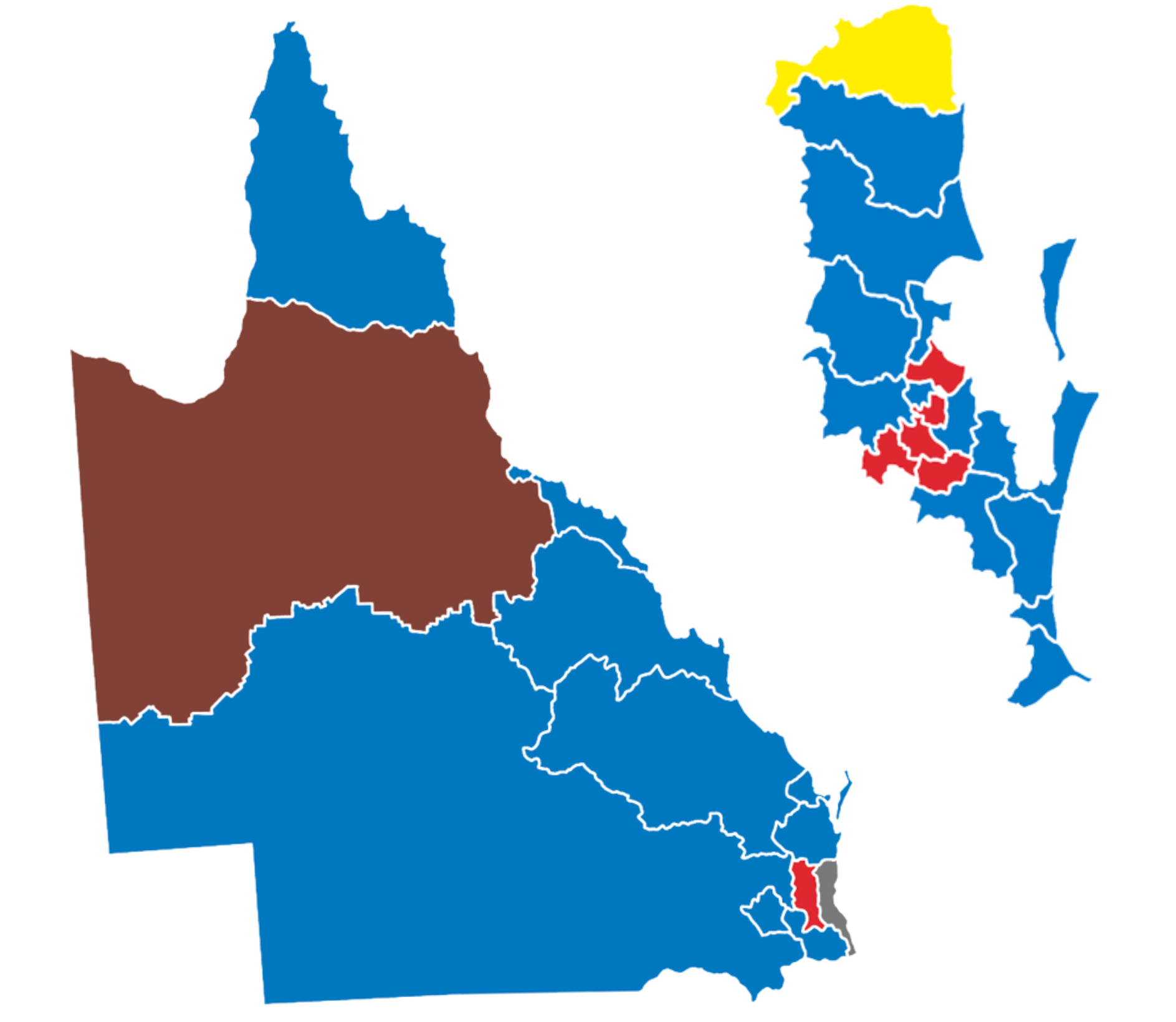
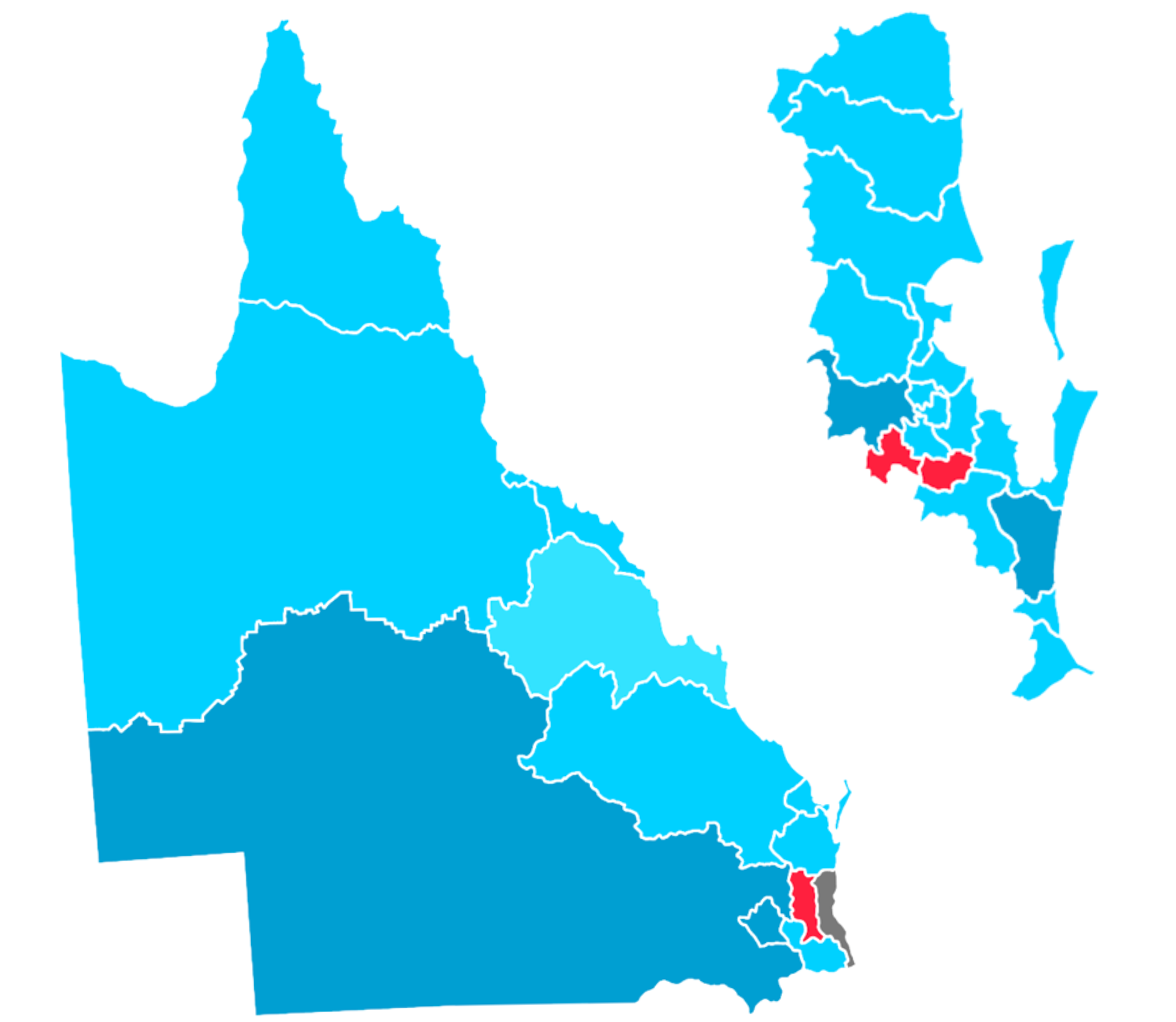
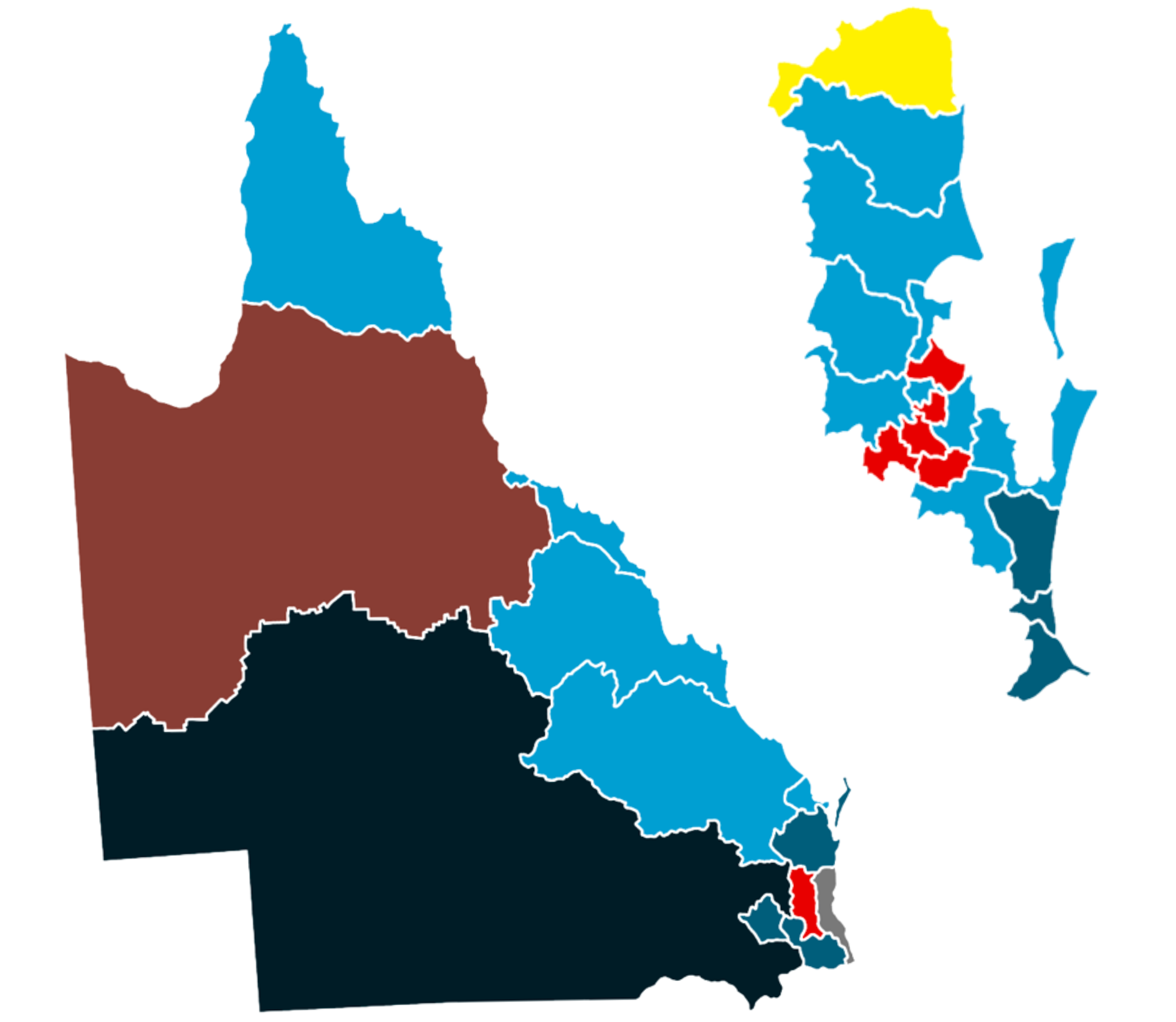

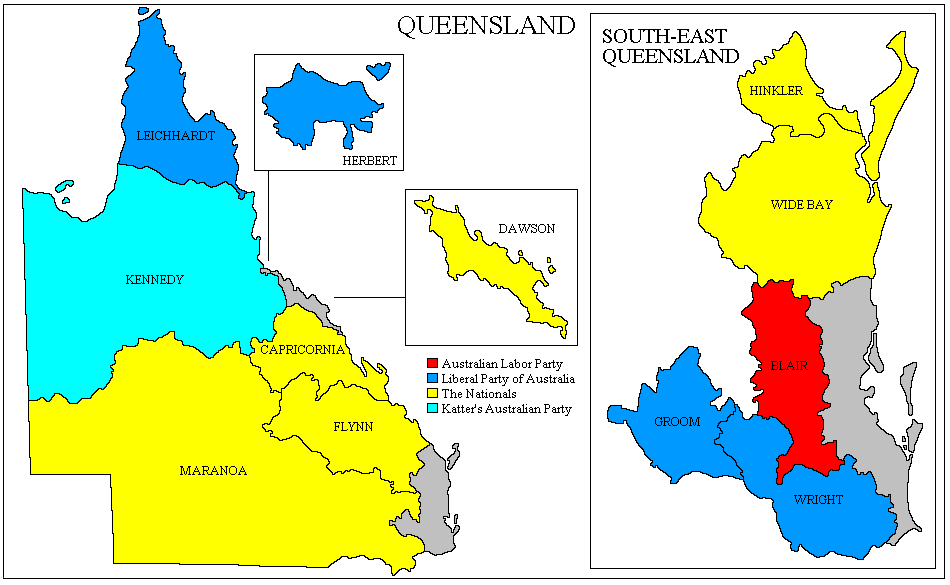
Electoral divisions: Queensland

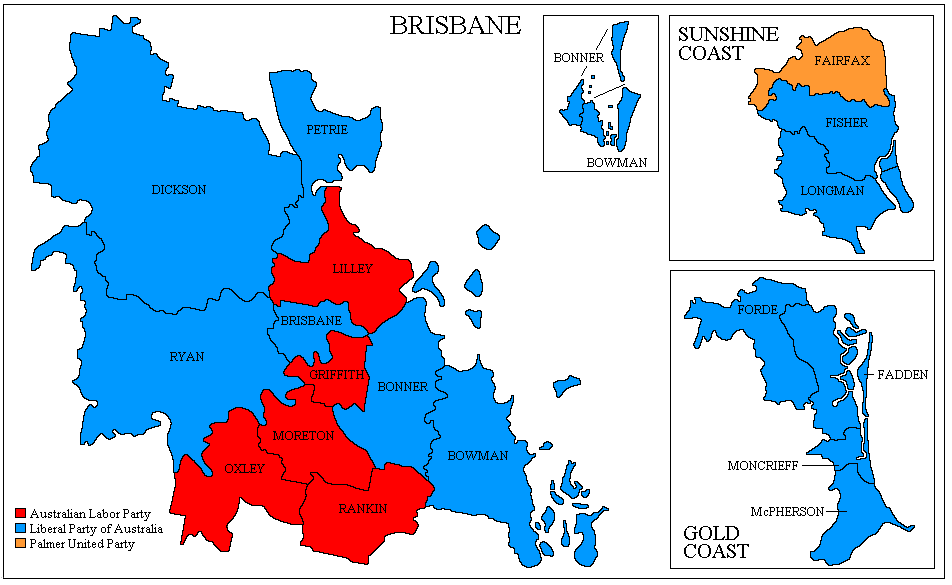
Electoral divisions: Brisbane area

Turnout 93.55% (CV) — Informal 5.13%
Party	Votes	%	Swing	Seats	Change
Liberal National	1,152,217	45.66	–1.76	22	▲1
Labor	751,230	29.77	–3.81	6	▼2
Palmer United	278,125	11.02	+11.02	1	▲1
Greens	156,884	6.22	–4.70		
Katter's Australian	94,540	3.75	+2.15	1	▲1
Family First	51,375	2.04	–1.85		
Rise Up Australia	9,889	0.39	+0.39		
Australian Sex Party	2,859	0.11	+0.11		
One Nation	2,529	0.10	−0.06		
Citizens Electoral Council	2,292	0.09	+0.03		
Australian Independents	1,901	0.08	+0.08		
Secular	1,808	0.07	+0.05		
Australian Voice	1,136	0.05	+0.05		
Democratic Labour	1,075	0.04	−0.15		
Stable Population	729	0.03	+0.03		
Future	481	0.02	+0.02		
Uniting Australia	386	0.02	+0.02		
Socialist Alliance	377	0.01	−0.02		
Independents	10,435	0.41	−1.48	0	▼1
Non Affiliated	2,984	0.12	+0.09		
Total	2,523,252			30	
Two-party-preferred vote
Liberal National	1,437,803	56.98	+1.84	22	▲1
Labor	1,085,449	43.02	–1.84	6	▼2

Labor to LNP: Capricornia, Petrie

LNP to Palmer United: Fairfax

== Western Australia ==
2013 Australian federal election (Western Australia)
← 2010	7 September 2013	2016 →

All 15 West Australian seats in the Australian House of Representatives and 6 (of the 12) seats in the Australian Senate
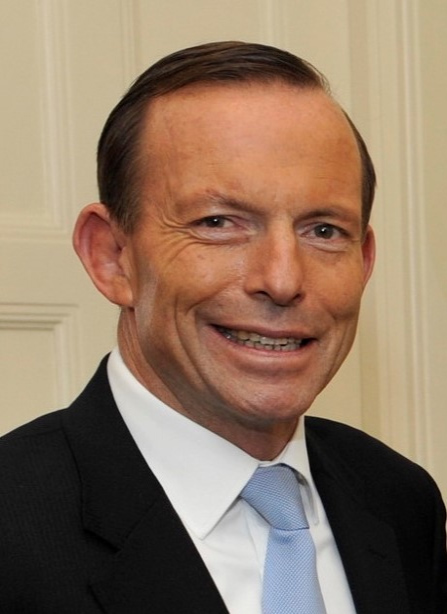

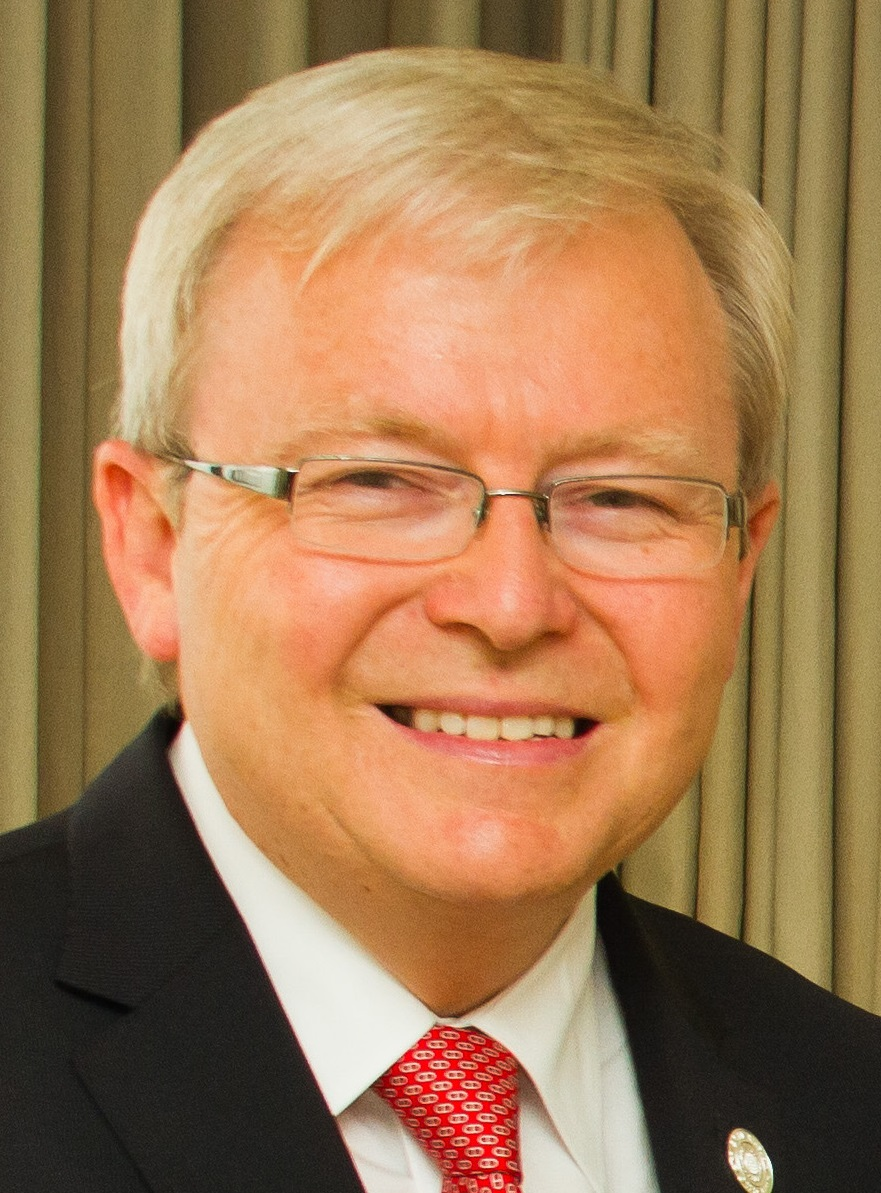

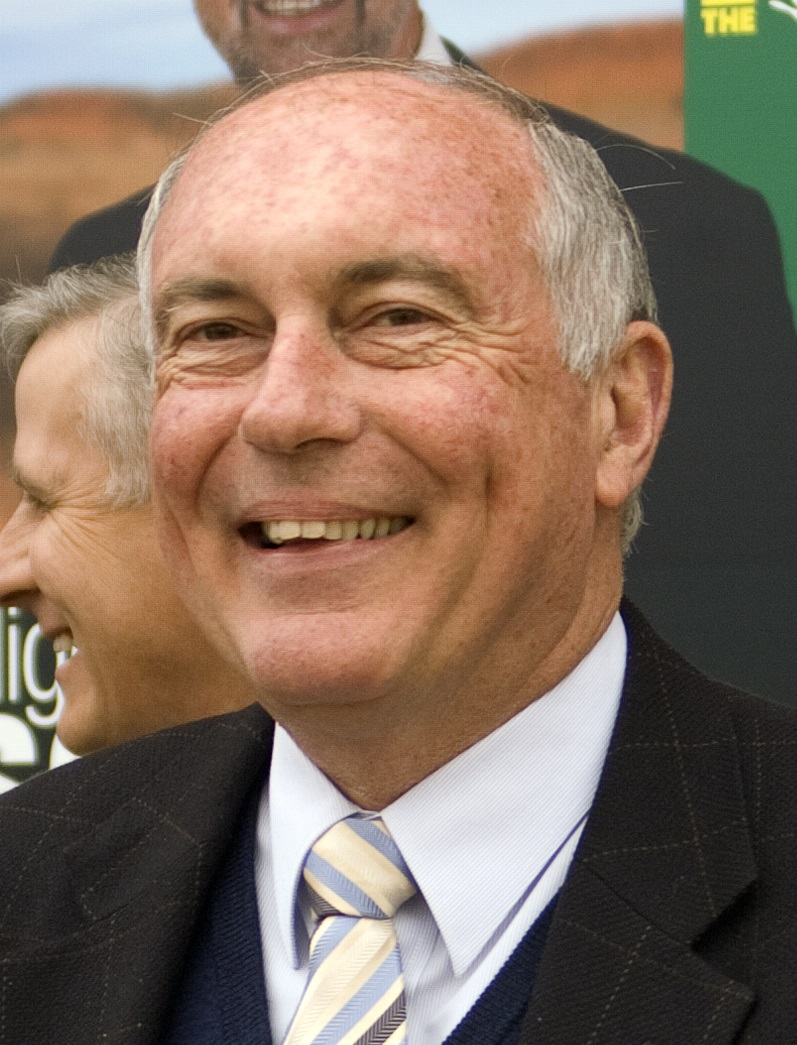
	First party	Second party	Third party
Leader	Tony Abbott	Kevin Rudd	Warren Truss
Party	Liberal	Labor	National
Last election	11 seats	3 seats	1 seat
Seats won	12 seats	3 seats	0 seats
Seat change	▲1	Steady	▼1
Popular vote	648,583	364,252	49,430
Percentage	51.21%	28.76%	3.90%
Swing	▲0.60	▼2.42	▲0.32
TPP	58.28%	41.72%
TPP swing	▲1.87	▼1.87
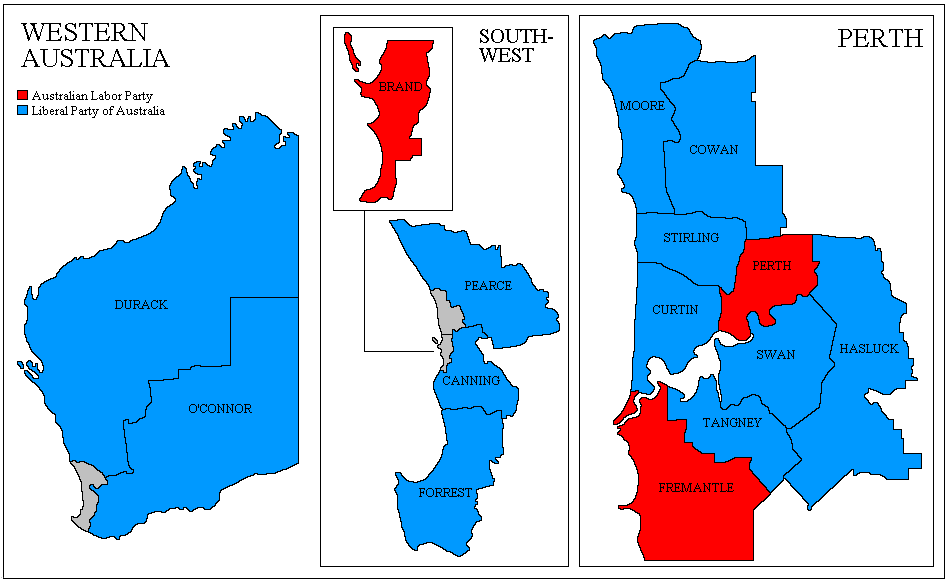
- Results by electorate

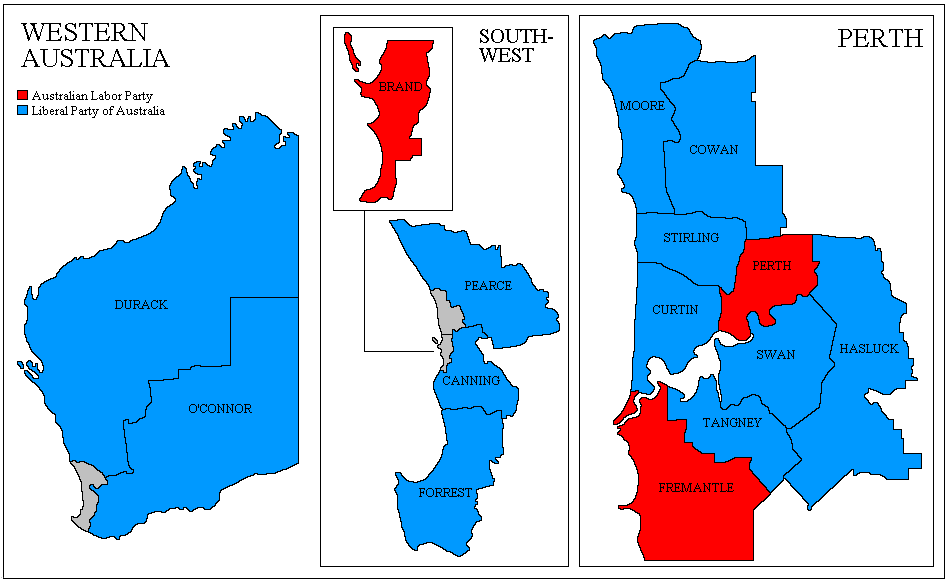
Electoral divisions: Western Australia

Turnout 92.07% (CV) — Informal 5.38%
Party	Votes	%	Swing	Seats	Change
Liberal	599,153	47.31	+0.29	12	▲1
Labor	364,252	28.76	–2.42	3	Steady
Greens	123,370	9.74	–2.42		
Palmer United	67,332	5.32	+5.32		
National Party (WA)	49,430	3.90	+0.32	0	▼1
Australian Christians	25,649	2.03	+2.03		
Family First	11,777	0.93	–0.79		
Rise Up Australia	9,153	0.72	+0.72		
Katter's Australian	4,997	0.39	+0.39		
Australian Sex Party	2,236	0.18	+0.01		
Citizens Electoral Council	1,638	0.13	+0.02		
Australian Sports	1,324	0.10	+0.10		
Democrats	1,170	0.09	+0.09		
Protectionist	923	0.07	+0.07		
Socialist Alliance	743	0.06	−0.05		
Independents	3,357	0.27	–0.15		
Total	1,266,504			15	
Two-party-preferred vote
Liberal/National Coalition	738,110	58.28	+1.87	12	▲1
Labor	528,394	41.72	–1.87	3	Steady

WA National to Liberal: O'Connor

== South Australia ==
2013 Australian federal election
← 2010	7 September 2013	2016 →

All 11 South Australian seats in the Australian House of Representatives and 6 (of the 12) seats in the Australian Senate
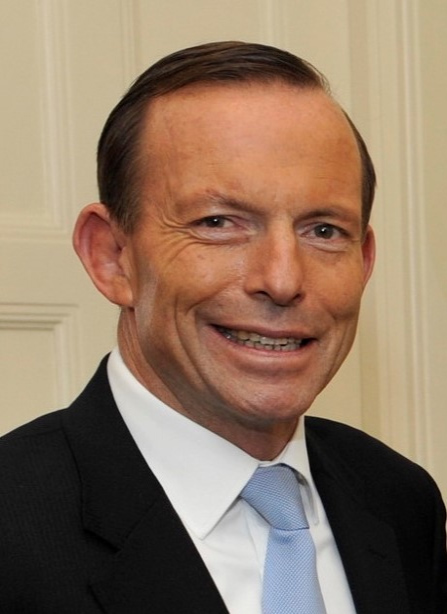

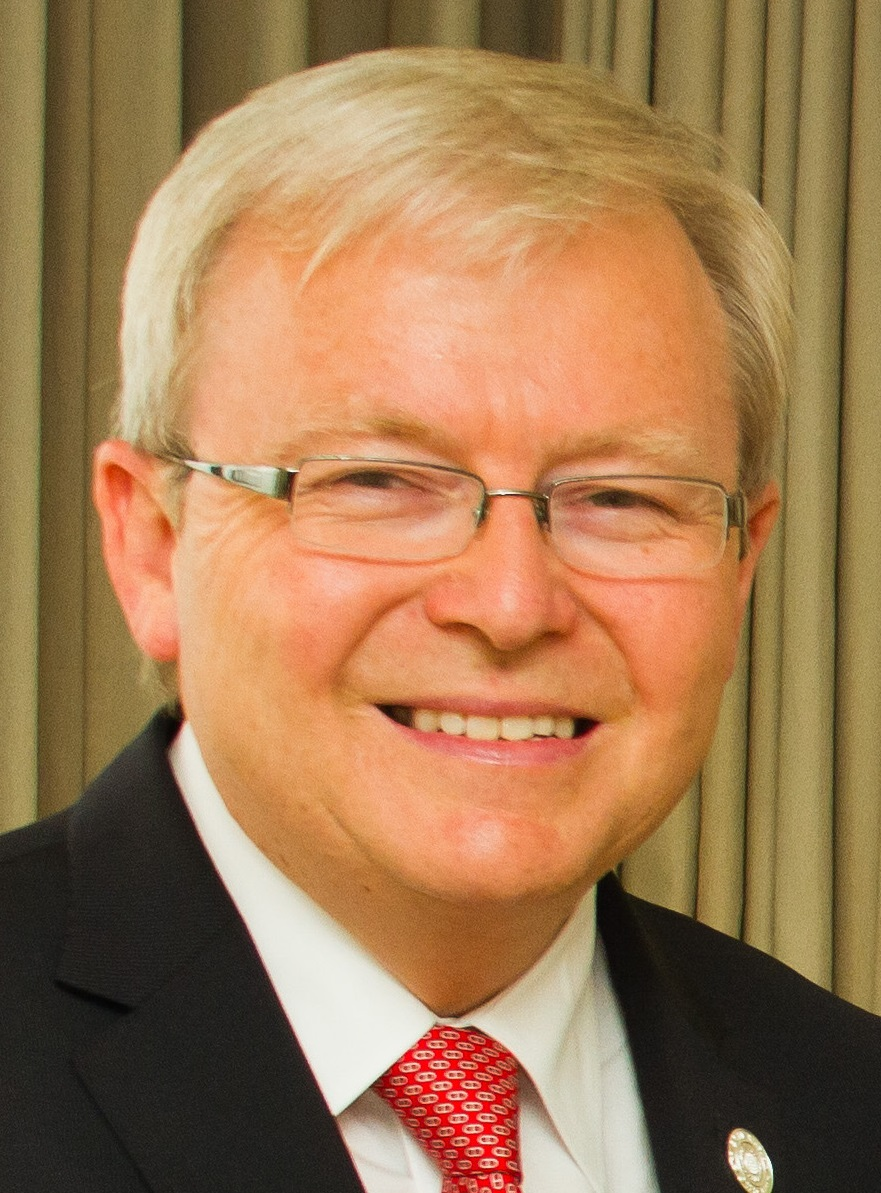
	First party	Second party
Leader	Tony Abbott	Kevin Rudd
Party	Coalition	Labor
Last election	5	6
Seats won	6	5
Seat change	▲1	▼1
Popular vote	447,286	359,273
Percentage	44.9%	35.73%
Swing	▲4.28	▼5.01
TPP	52.36%	47.64%
TPP swing	▲5.54	▼5.54
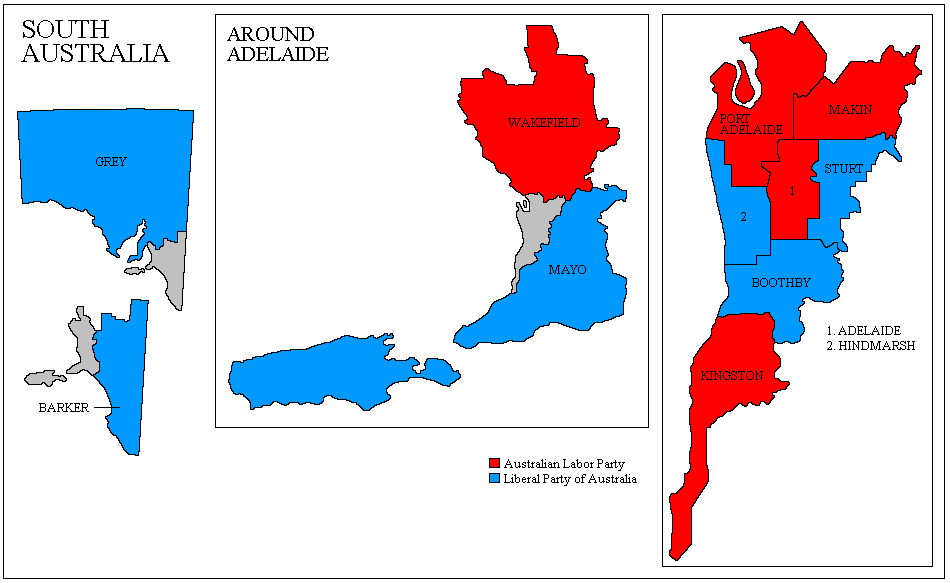
- Results by electorate

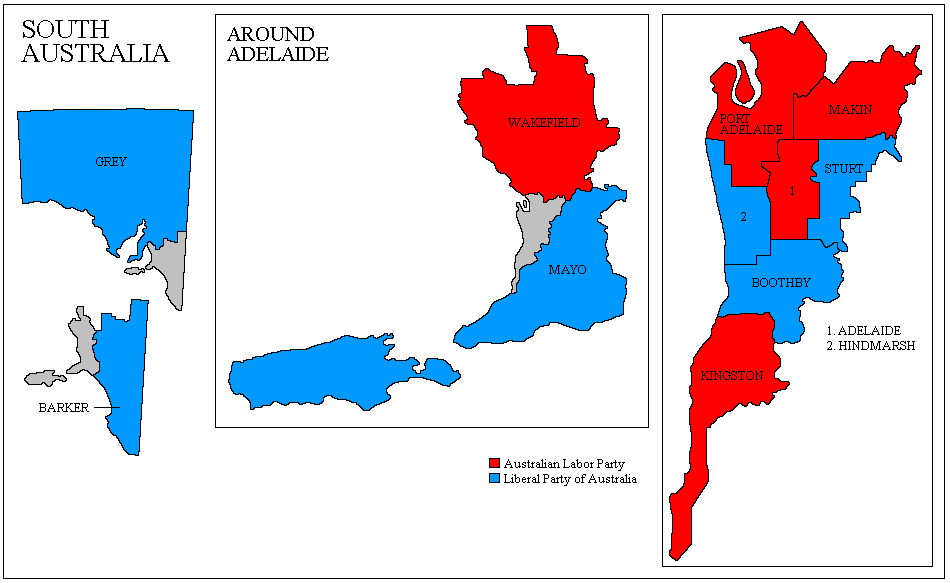
Electoral divisions: South Australia

Turnout 93.47% (CV) — Informal 4.85%
Party	Votes	%	Swing	Seats	Change
Liberal	447,286	44.49	+4.28	6	▲1
Labor	359,273	35.73	–5.01	5	▼1
Greens	83,252	8.28	–3.70		
Family First	54,409	5.41	+0.45		
Palmer United	37,981	3.78	+3.78		
National Party (SA)	4,021	0.40	+0.40		
Katter's Australian	2,268	0.23	+0.23		
Rise Up Australia	1,191	0.12	+0.12		
Australia First	1,116	0.11	+0.11		
Socialist Alliance	980	0.10	+0.02		
Democratic Labour	834	0.08	+0.08		
Independents	12,834	1.28	+0.76		
Total	1,005,445			11	
Two-party-preferred vote
Liberal/National Coalition	526,493	52.36	+5.54	6	▲1
Labor	478,952	47.64	–5.54	5	▼1

Labor to Liberal: Hindmarsh

== Tasmania ==
2013 Australian federal election (Tasmania)
← 2010	7 September 2013	2016 →

All 5 Tasmanian seats in the House of Representatives and all 12 seats in the Senate
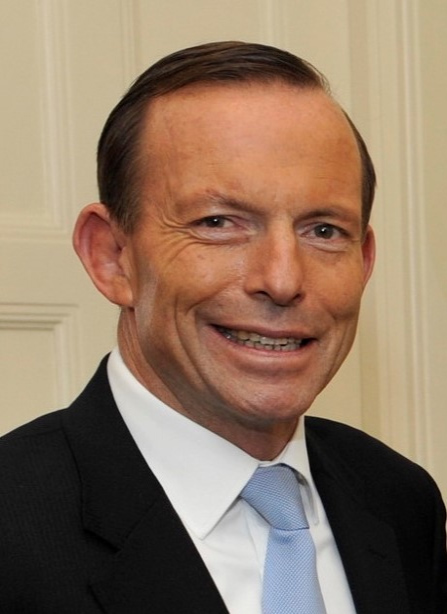

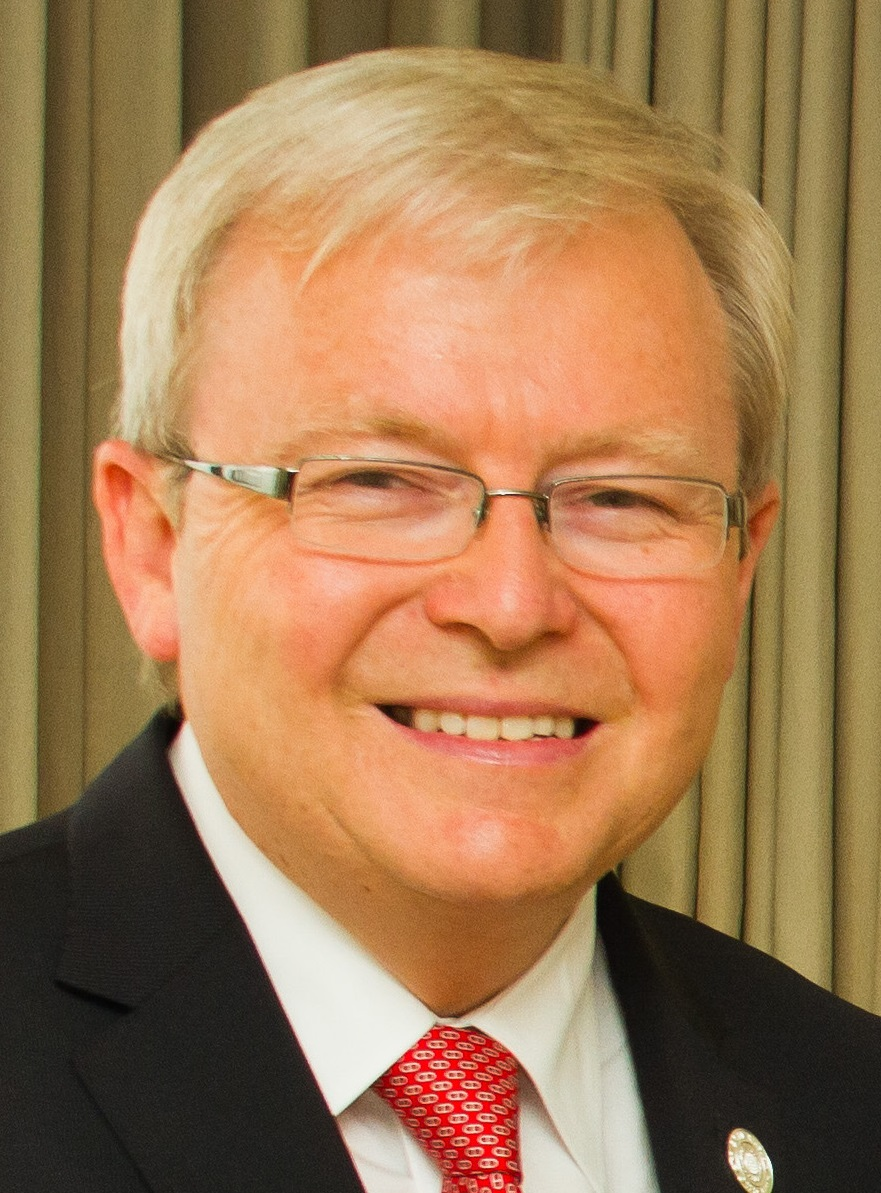
	First party	Second party
Leader	Tony Abbott	Kevin Rudd
Party	Liberal	Labor
Last election	0 seats	4 seats
Seats won	3 seats	1 seat
Seat change	▲3	▼3
Popular vote	132,961	114,977
Percentage	40.26%	34.81%
Swing	▲6.66	▼9.14
TPP	48.77%	51.23%
TPP swing	▲9.39	▼9.39
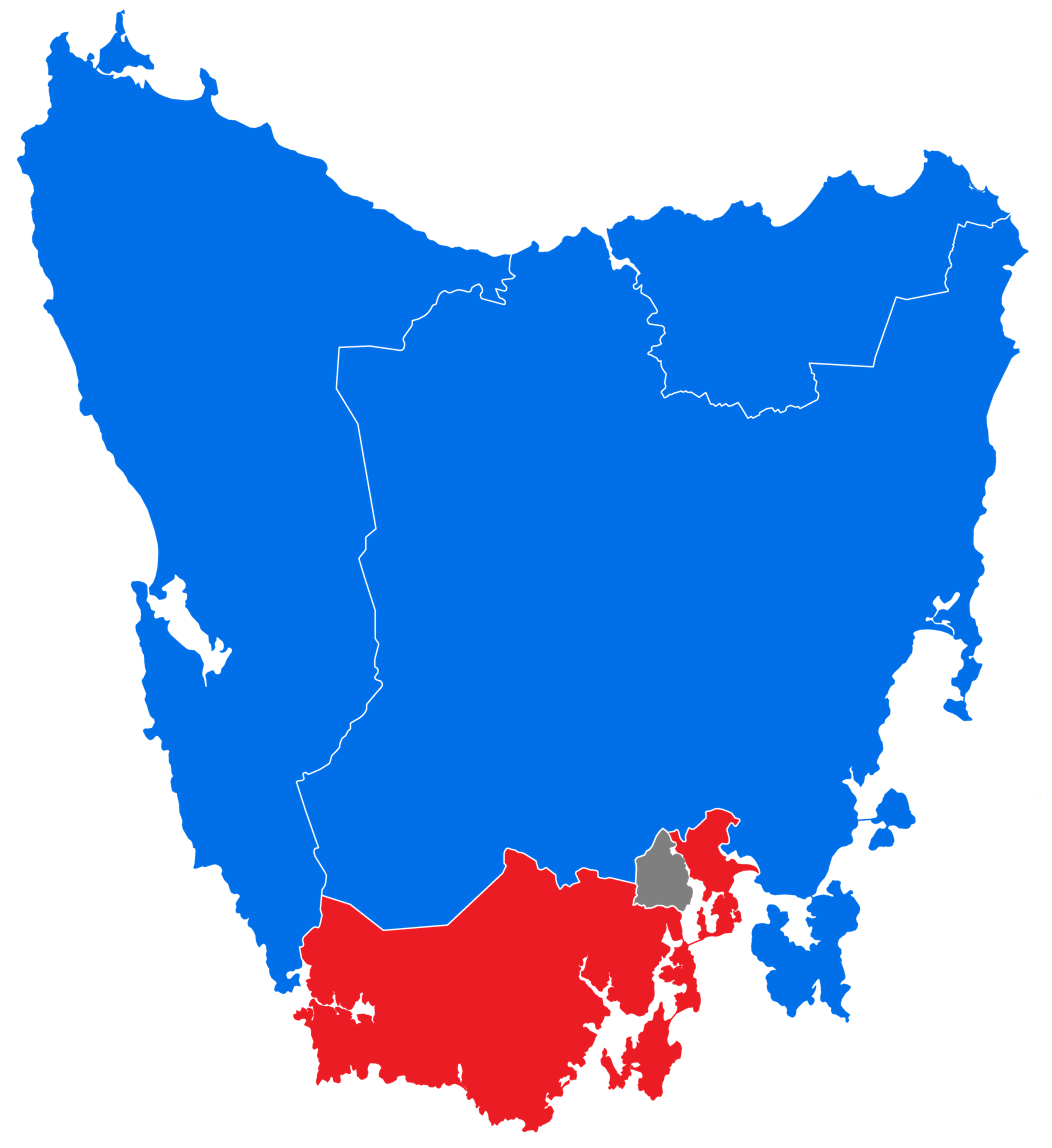

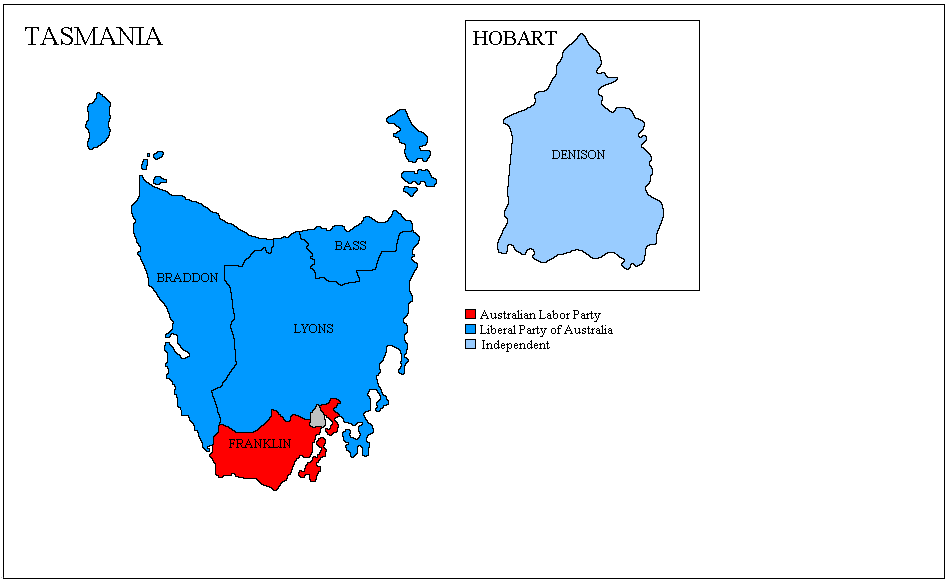
Electoral divisions: Tasmania

Turnout 94.78% (CV) — Informal 4.04%
Party	Votes	%	Swing	Seats	Change
Liberal	132,961	40.26	+6.66	3	▲3
Labor	114,977	34.81	–9.14	1	▼3
Greens	27,467	8.32	–8.50		
Palmer United	20,026	6.06	+6.06		
Family First	4,971	1.51	+1.51		
Rise Up Australia	1,824	0.55	+0.55		
Australian Christians	963	0.29	+0.29		
Australian Sex Party	877	0.27	+0.27		
Democratic Labour	554	0.17	+0.17		
Katter's Australian	478	0.14	+0.14		
Secular	384	0.12	–0.21		
Stable Population	124	0.04	+0.04		
Independents	24,688	7.47	+2.69	1	Steady
Total	330,294			5	
Two-party-preferred vote
Labor	169,208	51.23	–9.39	1	▼3
Liberal/National Coalition	161,086	48.77	+9.39	3	▲3

Independents: Andrew Wilkie

Labor to Liberal: Bass, Braddon, Lyons

== Territories ==
=== Australian Capital Territory ===
2013 Australian federal election (Australian Capital Territory)
← 2010	7 September 2013	2016 →

All 2 Australian Capital Territory seats in the Australian House of Representatives and all 2 seats in the Australian Senate
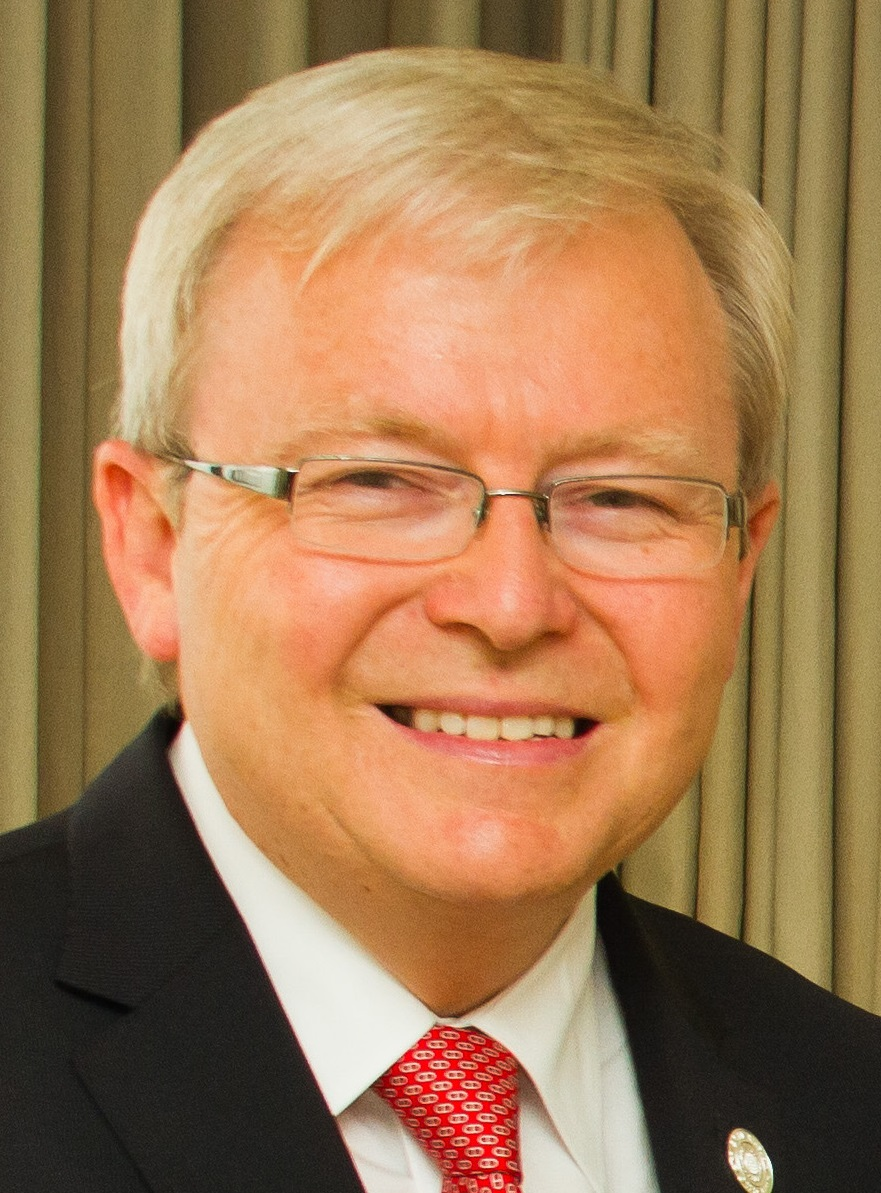

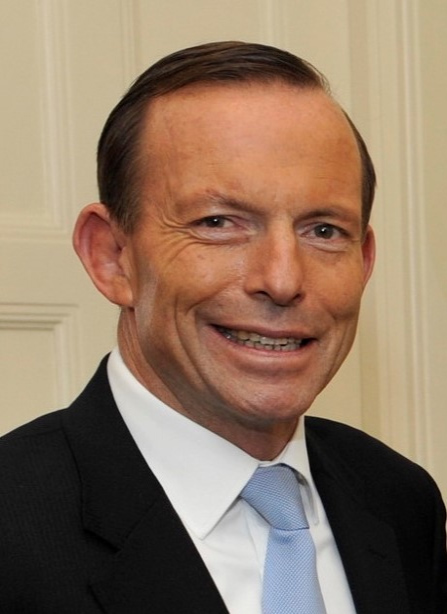
	First party	Second party
Leader	Kevin Rudd	Tony Abbott
Party	Labor	Liberal
Last election	2 seats	0 seats
Seats won	2 seats	0 seats
Seat change	Steady	Steady
Popular vote	103,676	96,815
Percentage	42.93%	34.62%
Swing	▼2.09	▼0.19
TPP	59.91%	40.09%
TPP swing	▼1.76	▲1.76
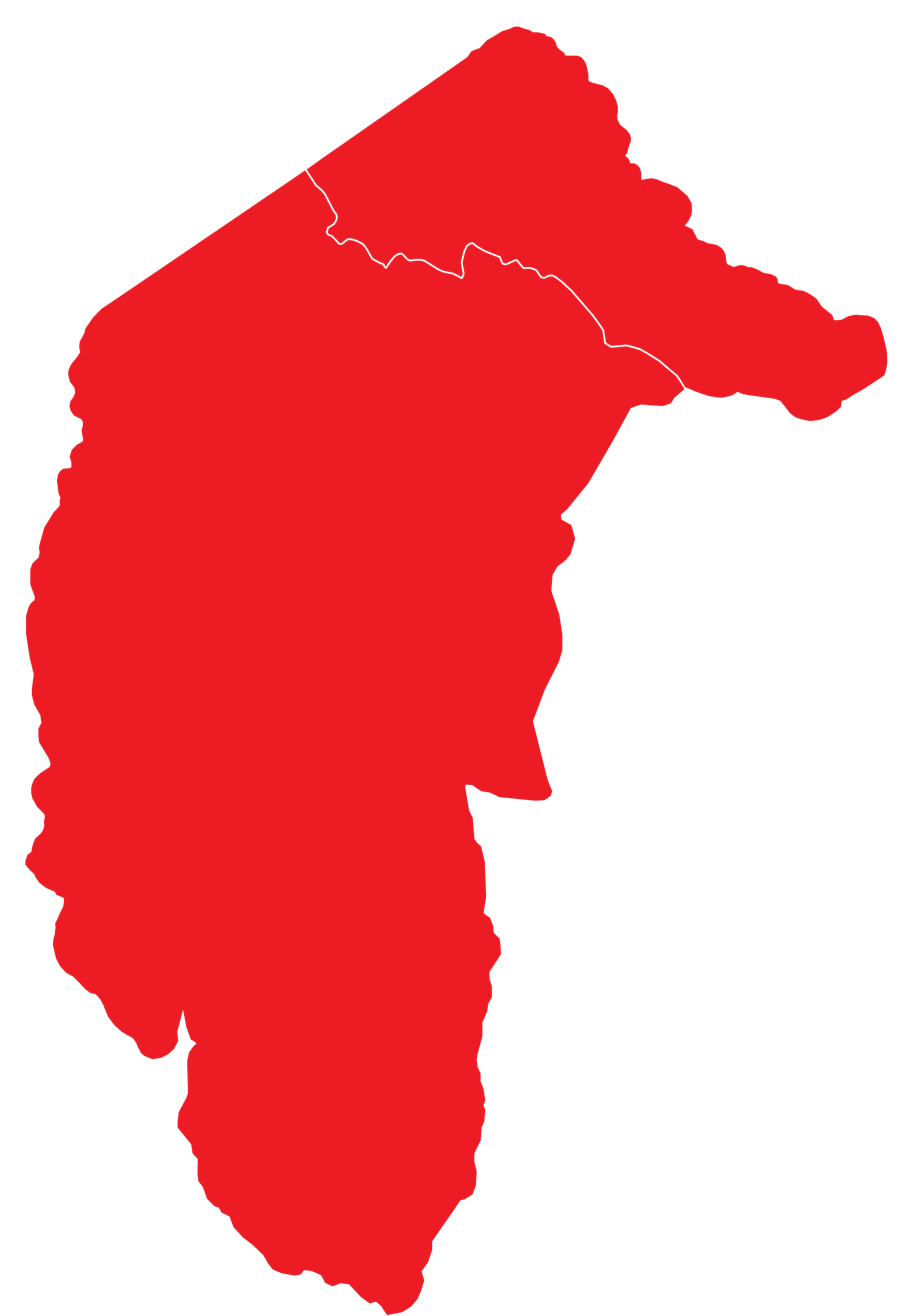

Turnout 94.59% (CV) — Informal 3.83%
Party	Votes	%	Swing	Seats	Change
Labor	103,676	42.93	–2.09	2	Steady
Liberal	83,612	34.62	−0.19	0	Steady
Greens	32,356	13.40	–5.80		
Bullet Train	9,855	4.08	+4.08		
Palmer United	6,788	2.81	+2.81		
Democrats	2,444	1.01	+1.01		
Rise Up Australia	1,508	0.62	+0.62		
Secular	1,264	0.52	−0.45		
Total	241,503			2	
Two-party-preferred vote
Labor	144,688	59.91	–1.76	2	Steady
Liberal/National Coalition	96,815	40.09	+1.76	0	Steady

=== Northern Territory ===
2013 Australian federal election (Northern Territory)
← 2010	7 September 2013	2016 →

All 2 Australian Capital Territory seats in the Australian House of Representatives and all 2 seats in the Australian Senate
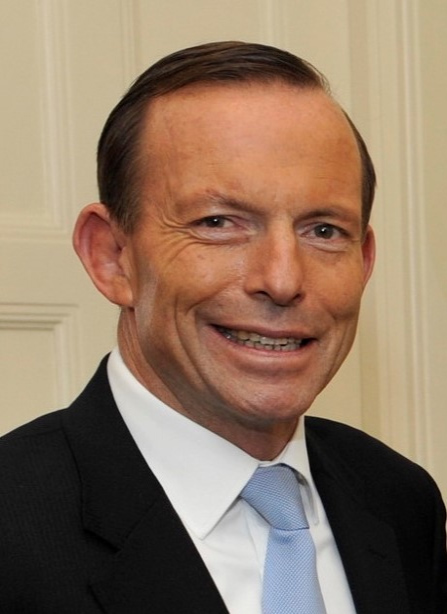

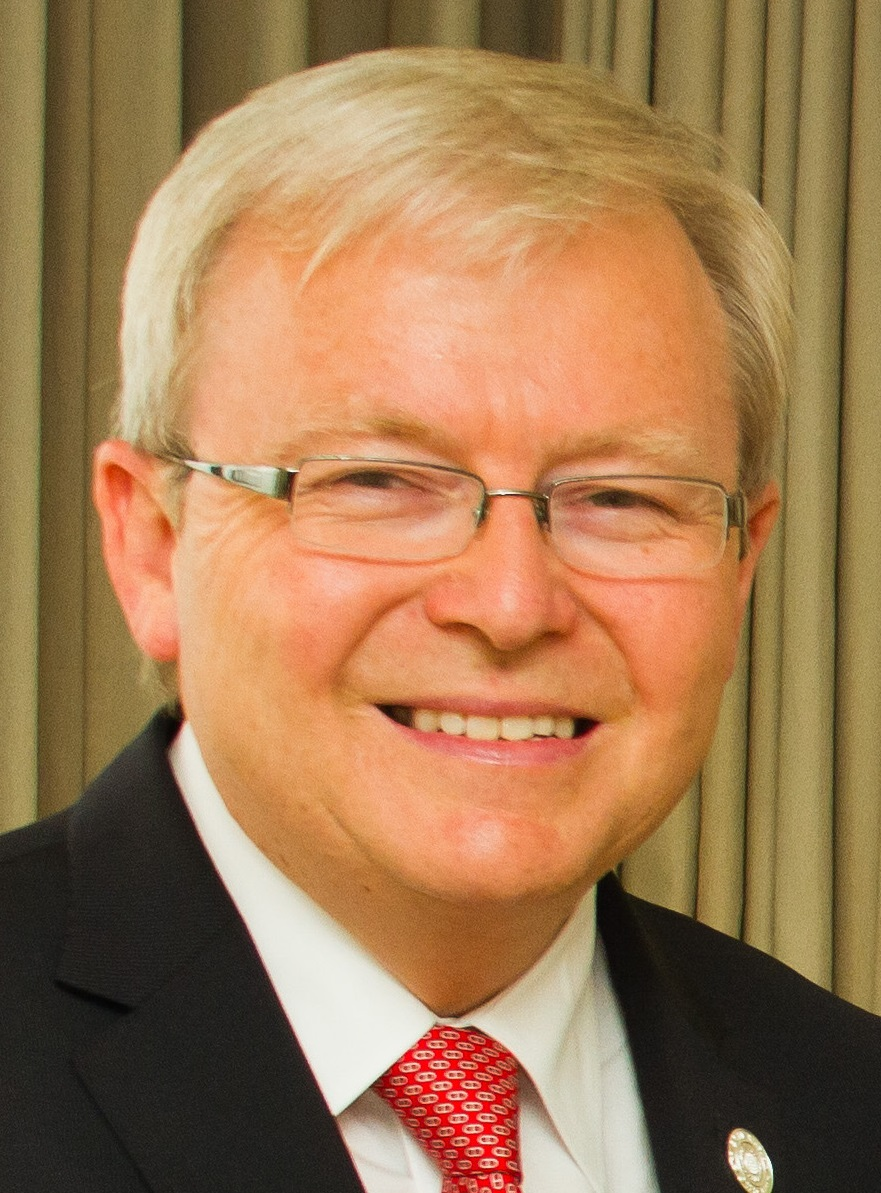
	First party	Second party
Leader	Tony Abbott	Kevin Rudd
Party	Liberal/National coalition	Labor
Last election	1 seat	1 seat
Seats won	1	1
Seat change	Steady	Steady
Popular vote	41,468	37,221
Percentage	41.70%	37.43%
Swing	▲0.87	▼0.48
TPP	50.35%	49.65%
TPP swing	▲1.09	▼1.09
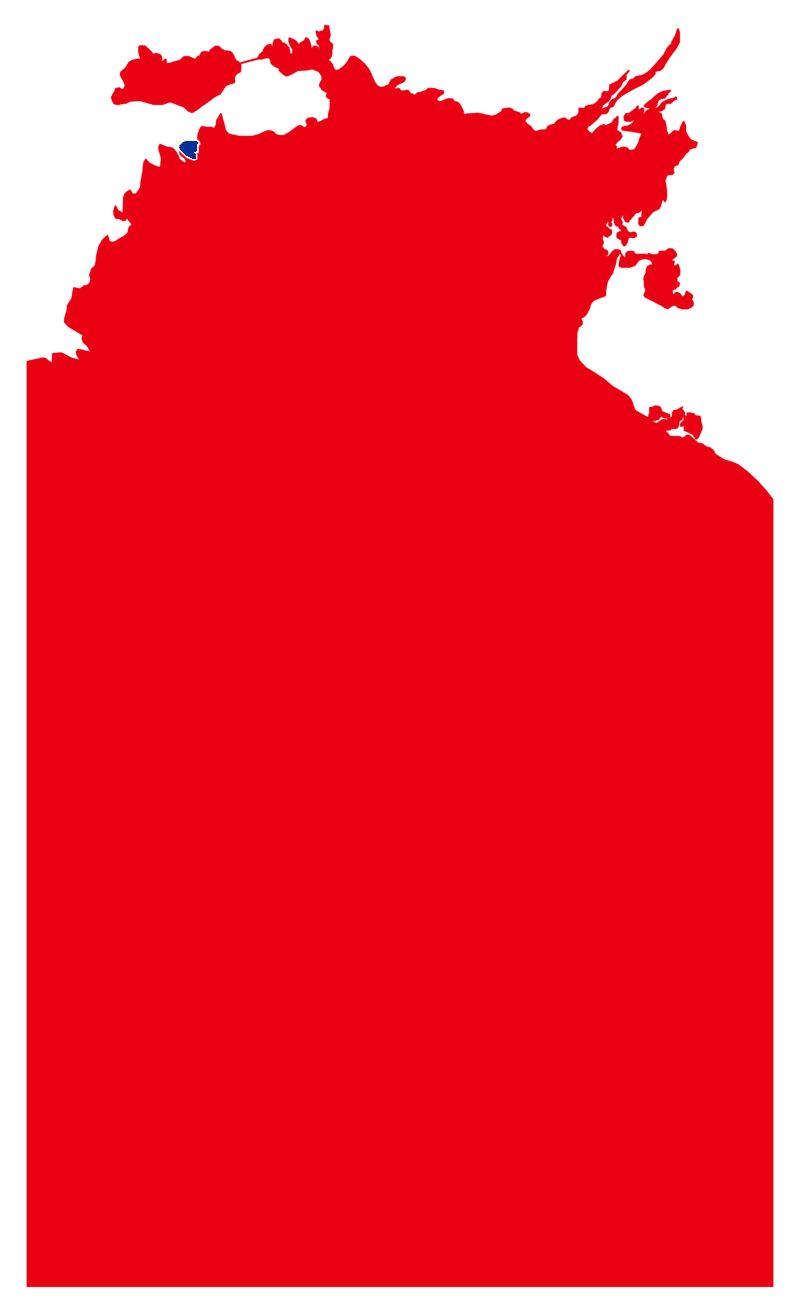
- Electorate Results

Turnout 82.14% (CV) — Informal 6.30%
Party	Votes	%	Swing	Seats	Change
Country Liberal	41,468	41.70	+0.87	1	Steady
Labor	37,221	37.43	–0.48	1	Steady
Greens	7,841	7.89	–5.08		
Palmer United	4,609	4.63	+4.63		
Citizens Electoral Council	1,856	1.87	−0.61		
Australian Sex Party	1,847	1.86	+1.86		
First Nations	1,810	1.82	+1.82		
Rise Up Australia	1,444	1.45	+1.45		
Voluntary Euthanasia	597	0.60	+0.60		
Independents	748	0.75	−3.46		
Total	99,441			2	
Two-party-preferred vote
Liberal/National Coalition	50,067	50.35	+1.09	1	Steady
Labor	49,374	49.65	–1.09	1	Steady

== Two party preferred preference flow ==
House of Representatives (IRV – votes
Party	Liberal National coalition			Labor Party		
Party	Votes	%	±	Votes	%	±
Greens	189,524	16.97%		927,394	83.03%	
One Nation	12,147	55.10%		9,899	44.90%	
United Australia Party	380,532	53.67%		328,503	46.33%	
Family First Party	106,063	58.33%		75,757	41.67%	
Liberal Democratic Party	3,752	79.56%		964	20.44%	
Christian Democratic Party	63,344	71.51%		25,232	28.49%	
Democratic Labour Party	15,700	43.51%		20,386	56.49%	
Rise Up Australia Party	29,262	60.23%		19,320	39.77%	
Australia First Party	4,427	59.73%		2,985	40.27%	
Animal Justice Party	594	31.63%		1,284	68.37%	
Katter's Australian	72,483	54.00%		61,743	46.00%	
Australian Christians	29,769	70.05%		12,729	29.95%	
Citizens Electoral Council	5,136	49.38%		5,264	50.62%	
Socialist Alliance	956	19.00%		4,076	81.00%	
Australian Protectionist Party	790	73.22%	–	289	26.78%	–
Australian Sex Party	29,360	37.37%		49,211	62.63%	
Stable Population Party	1,919	48.53%	–	2,035	51.47%	–
Bullet Train for Australia	8,541	43.13%	–	11,260	56.87%	–
Secular Party of Australia	1,440	29.79%		3,394	70.21	
Australian Democrats	1,709	47.29%		1,905	52.71%	
Non-Custodial Parents Party	630	40.72%		917	59.28%	–
Future Party	399	33.99%		775	66.01%	
Senator Online	126	60.29%		83	39.71%	
Australian Sports Party	705	53.25%	–	619	46.75%	–
Uniting Australia Party	212	54.92%	–	174	45.08%	–
Voluntary Euthanasia Party	248	41.54%	–	349	58.46%	–
Australian Voice Party	842	50.09%	–	839	49.91%	–
Country Alliance	2,971	63.11%	–	1,737	36.89%	–
Australia's First Nations Political Party	729	40.28%	–	1,081	59.72%	–
Independents	76,032	42.90%		101,185	57.10%	
Total	14,659,042	100.00		151	Steady	
Two-party-preferred vote
Liberal/National Coalition	6,908,710	53.49%				
Labor	6,006,217	46.51%				
Invalid/blank votes				–	–	–
Turnout				–	–	–
Registered voters		–	–	–	–	–
Source: AEC for both votes

== See also ==
- 2013 Australian federal election
- Results of the 2013 Australian federal election (Senate)
- Post-election pendulum for the 2013 Australian federal election
- Members of the Australian House of Representatives, 2013–2016
