= Australian Protectionist Party =

Australian Protectionist Party Australian Protectionists
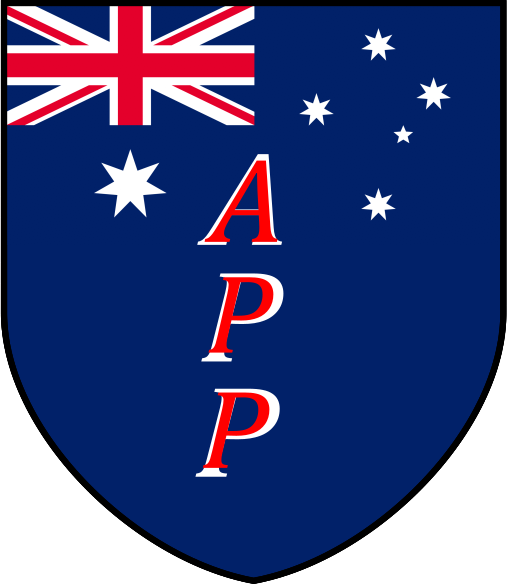
- Abbreviation: APP
- Founded: 2007; 19 years ago
- Registered: 18 January 2011 (Note: Party was de-registered in 2015.)
- Split from: Australia First
- Headquarters: Dover, Tasmania
- Newspaper: • Destiny
- Ideology: Protectionism; Australian nationalism; Social conservatism; Anti-immigration; Anti-Islam; White nationalism
- Political position: Far-right
- Religion: Christianity
- National affiliation: Australian Coalition of Nationalists (since 2016)
- Colours: Blue
- Slogan: “To protect, preserve and defend our identity, heritage, and freedoms.”

Website
- www.protectionist.net

The Australian Protectionist Party (APP) is a minor nationalist political party in Australia. The party stated that it had been formed to fill the void of a pro-Australian party within the political arena based on traditional values.

The APP was formed in 2007 as a splinter organization of the Australia First Party, party led by Jim Saleam. The party was registered as a federal political party with the Australian Electoral Commission (AEC) on 18 January 2011 and de-registered on 18 June 2015. The party continues to have an active website and seeks donations. Its current officeholders are not disclosed and its address is given as a PO box in Tasmania.

== History ==
=== Foundation and early years, 2007–2010 ===
Founded in 2007, the party was formed from a split with the Australia First Party (AFP) after initially being described as one of its three factions. By 2010, the party was believed to have adopted the 'BNP model under Nick Griffin', moving away from Neo-Nazism and toward an authentic voice for white nationalism and white alienation. This supposed change had come after a 2008 invitation from the party for a Nick Griffin speaking tour of Australia had been accepted. However, Griffin had been blocked from entering the country.

Darrin Hodges ran unsuccessfully as a candidate in the 2008 elections for Sutherland Shire Council, coming last in his ward. At the 2010 Australian federal election, Hodges and Nicholas Hunter-Folkes (aka. Nick Folkes) ran a Senate ticket in New South Wales, running as independents, as APP was not registered in time. They received 1,864 votes or 0.04% of the vote. Andrew Phillips stood for the seat of Mayo in South Australia, also as an independent, receiving 993 votes or 1.08% of the votes.

=== Registration, elections and de-registration, 2011–2015 ===
In June 2012, Andrew Phillips was described as the party's nominal leader, following the resignation of de facto party leader Darrin Hodges. In September 2012, NSW chairman Nick Folkes unsuccessfully contested the NSW council elections for the Municipality of Leichhardt, receiving 41 votes or 0.6% of the total vote for the ward. In December 2012, Folkes resigned from APP to form Party for Freedom, modeled on Wilder's Freedom Party, and taking the entire Sydney branch with him. Folkes' Party for Freedom appears to have links to Pauline Hanson's One Nation.

At the 2013 federal election for the Senate for the state of New South Wales, the APP ticket of Mark Grech and Christian Johns received 2,424 votes or 0.06% of the vote. Two years later, on 18 June 2015, the party would be de-registered by the Australian Electoral Commission, but the APP would still operate as an organization.

=== Right alliance, 2016–present ===
In June 2016, APP in Western Australia hosted a public speaking event in Perth featuring Graeme Campbell, whom APP described as "the Father of modern Australian nationalism". Campbell was the founder in 1996 of the far-right Australia First Party and had been a Labor, One Nation and independent MP.

In October 2016, the APP joined with the Australian Coalition of Nationalists (ACN), a political group formed by the Australia First Party (AFP) alongside other nationalist organizations such as the Nationalist Alternative (NA), the Eureka Youth League, and the Hellenic Nationalists of Australia (HNA).

The APP hailed the election of United States President Donald Trump, saying it believed this "ushered in a new era".

The APP has been essentially inactive since 2016, with the only evidence of any activity being the occasional post on its website.

== Ideology ==
Australia’s way of life needs protecting from the destructiveness of Multiculturalism and Political Correctness… APP is a party for ordinary Australians seeking to defend the Australian way of life… an alternative to the Establishment’s internationalist policies, and aims to protect Australia’s national interests

— Australian Protectionist Party, 2017

With an emphasis on Australian nationalism, the party's core ideology centres around protectionism, social conservatism; opposition to immigration, multiculturalism and Islam, and opposition to believed Islamic extremism in Australia.

The party sits on the right-wing of the political spectrum, being described by the Global Project Against Hate and Extremism (GPAHE) as white nationalist, echoing the great replacement conspiracy theory. Kathryn Crosby of the University of Technology Sydney describes the APP to have certain populism characteristics.

Since its formation, the party has been active in protesting against the presence of asylum seekers and Muslims, and has also organised several protests against Sharia law being implemented in Australia.

The party has participated in anti-asylum seeker rallies such as the one outside the Villawood Immigration Detention Centre in 2010.

== Electoral performance ==
=== Federal Parliament ===
House of Representatives
Election year	# of overall votes	% of overall vote	# of overall seats won	+/–	Position
2013	1,079	0.01 (#29)	0 / 150	0	Extra-parliamentary

Senate
Election year	# of overall votes	% of overall vote	# of overall seats won	# of overall seats	+/–
2013	3,379	0.03 (#42)	0 / 40	0 / 76	0

== See also ==
- Protectionist Party
- Far-right politics in Australia

== Bibliography ==
- Grant, Bligh (2019). The Rise of Right-Populism. New York: Springer Berlin Heidelberg. ISBN 978-981-13-2669-1.
- Sykes, Nathan (2022). The Australian Nationalist White Book. Australia: New Australian Bulletin. ISBN 9798403076128.
- McSwiney, Jordan (2024). Far-right Political Parties in Australia: Disorganisation and Electoral Failure. New York: Routledge. ISBN 978-1-032-53650-7.
