= Nationalist Alternative =

Nationalist Alternative Australian Nationalist Alternative
- Abbreviation: NatAlt; NA
- Founded: 2014
- Dissolved: c. 2019
- Headquarters: Melbourne, Victoria
- Ideology: Fascism; White nationalism; Anti-semitism; Anti-immigration
- Political position: Far-right
- Colours: Blue and White

The Nationalist Alternative (NA), also known as the Australian Nationalist Alternative, (Note: Another title cited is, "Nationalist Alternative Australia.") is a minor Australian nationalist political party, (Note: The organisation hasn't been explicitly defined as a party or simply a movement/organisation.) mainly active during the 2010s. Sitting on the far-right of the political spectrum, NA was heavily associated with other groups like the Lads Society and the True Blue Crew, as well as holding affiliations with anti-Islam activists, particularly the Bendigo mosque protests.

The party's website state of its objectives: “reaffirming Australian culture and restoring the sovereignty and independence of the Australian nation.”
