= Electoral results for the Division of Hindmarsh =

Australian division election results

This is a list of electoral results for the Division of Hindmarsh in Australian federal elections from the division's creation in 1903 until the present.

== Members ==
Member	Party	Term
James Hutchison	Labour	1903–1909
William Archibald	Labor	1910–1916
William Archibald	National Labor	1916–1917
William Archibald	Nationalist	1917–1919
Norman Makin	Labor	1919–1946
Albert Thompson	Labor	1946–1949
Clyde Cameron	Labor	1949–1980
John Scott	Labor	1980–1993
Chris Gallus	Liberal	1993–2004
Steve Georganas	Labor	2004–2013
Matt Williams	Liberal	2013–2016
Steve Georganas	Labor	2016–2019
Mark Butler	Labor	2019–present

== Election results ==
=== Elections in the 2020s ===
==== 2025 ====
2025 Australian federal election: Hindmarsh
Party	Candidate	Votes	%	±%
Labor	Mark Butler	54,145	48.14	+5.96
Liberal	Chris Lehmann	25,984	23.10	−9.59
Greens	Matthew Wright	15,246	13.56	−0.31
One Nation	Rocco Deangelis	5,594	4.97	+1.04
Trumpet of Patriots	Andrew Townsend	4,782	4.25	+3.66
Family First	Alex Tennikoff	2,646	2.35	+2.35
Independent	Jake Hall-Evans	1,786	1.59	+1.59
Animal Justice	Matt Pastro	1,565	1.39	−0.73
Fusion	Adrien Aloe	723	0.64	+0.64
Total formal votes		112,471	93.65	−0.64
Informal votes		7,624	6.35	+0.64
Turnout		120,095	91.41	+0.43
Two-party-preferred result
Labor	Mark Butler	74,623	66.35	+7.40
Liberal	Chris Lehmann	37,848	33.65	−7.40
Labor hold		Swing	+7.40	

==== 2022 ====
2022 Australian federal election: Hindmarsh
Party	Candidate	Votes	%	±%
Labor	Mark Butler	46,547	42.18	−0.91
Liberal	Anna Finizio	36,072	32.69	−4.06
Greens	Patrick O'Sullivan	15,310	13.87	+2.89
One Nation	Walter Johnson	4,341	3.93	+3.93
United Australia	George Melissourgos	3,896	3.53	−0.81
Animal Justice	Matt Pastro	2,340	2.12	−0.83
Great Australian	Jamie Witt	1,184	1.07	+1.07
Federation	Dianne Richards	653	0.59	+0.59
Total formal votes		110,343	94.29	−1.39
Informal votes		6,686	5.71	+1.39
Turnout		117,029	90.98	−1.87
Two-party-preferred result
Labor	Mark Butler	65,043	58.95	+2.41
Liberal	Anna Finizio	45,300	41.05	−2.41
Labor hold		Swing	+2.41	

Alluvial diagram for preference flows in the seat of Hindmarsh in the 2022 federal election. indicates at what stage the winning candidate had over 50% of the votes and was declared the winner.

=== Elections in the 2010s ===
==== 2019 ====
2019 Australian federal election: Hindmarsh
Party	Candidate	Votes	%	±%
Labor	Mark Butler	46,950	43.09	+3.10
Liberal	Jake Hall-Evans	40,039	36.75	+5.45
Greens	Matt Farrell	11,966	10.98	+4.38
United Australia	Rose Morris	4,729	4.34	+4.34
Animal Justice	Alison Kelty	3,219	2.95	+1.18
Conservative National	Rajan Vaid	2,052	1.88	+1.88
Total formal votes		108,955	95.68	+0.43
Informal votes		4,924	4.32	−0.43
Turnout		113,879	92.85	+1.55
Two-party-preferred result
Labor	Mark Butler	61,606	56.54	−1.89
Liberal	Jake Hall-Evans	47,349	43.46	+1.89
Labor hold		Swing	−1.89	

==== 2016 ====
2016 Australian federal election: Hindmarsh
Party	Candidate	Votes	%	±%
Liberal	Matt Williams	39,570	40.36	−5.81
Labor	Steve Georganas	33,355	34.02	−3.93
Xenophon	Daniel Kirk	14,774	15.07	+15.07
Greens	Patrick O'Sullivan	6,401	6.53	−2.31
Family First	Mark Potter	1,977	2.02	−1.03
Animal Justice	Bin Liu	1,456	1.49	+1.49
Christian Democrats	Marina William	499	0.51	+0.51
Total formal votes		98,032	95.86	+0.74
Informal votes		4,232	4.14	−0.74
Turnout		102,264	91.54	−1.51
Two-party-preferred result
Labor	Steve Georganas	49,586	50.58	+2.47
Liberal	Matt Williams	48,446	49.42	−2.47
Labor gain from Liberal		Swing	+2.47	

==== 2013 ====
2013 Australian federal election: Hindmarsh
Party	Candidate	Votes	%	±%
Liberal	Matt Williams	43,639	46.17	+7.53
Labor	Steve Georganas	35,876	37.95	−6.79
Greens	Andrew Payne	8,360	8.84	−3.32
Family First	Bob Randall	2,883	3.05	+0.06
Palmer United	George Melissourgos	2,332	2.47	+2.47
Democratic Labour	David McCabe	834	0.88	+0.88
Katter's Australian	Kym McKay	599	0.63	+0.63
Total formal votes		94,523	95.12	+0.38
Informal votes		4,847	4.88	−0.38
Turnout		99,370	93.05	−1.08
Two-party-preferred result
Liberal	Matt Williams	49,048	51.89	+7.97
Labor	Steve Georganas	45,475	48.11	−7.97
Liberal gain from Labor		Swing	+7.97	

==== 2010 ====
2010 Australian federal election: Hindmarsh
Party	Candidate	Votes	%	±%
Labor	Steve Georganas	39,736	44.54	−2.67
Liberal	Jassmine Wood	34,831	39.04	−1.04
Greens	Matthew Fisher	10,773	12.07	+5.09
Family First	Bob Randall	2,563	2.87	+0.75
Democrats	Greg Croke	767	0.86	−1.14
Climate Sceptics	Adrian Paech	554	0.62	+0.62
Total formal votes		89,224	94.83	−1.33
Informal votes		4,868	5.17	+1.33
Turnout		94,092	93.86	−1.51
Two-party-preferred result
Labor	Steve Georganas	49,698	55.70	+0.65
Liberal	Jassmine Wood	39,526	44.30	−0.65
Labor hold		Swing	+0.65	

=== Elections in the 2000s ===
==== 2007 ====
2007 Australian federal election: Hindmarsh
Party	Candidate	Votes	%	±%
Labor	Steve Georganas	42,818	47.21	+4.88
Liberal	Rita Bouras	36,356	40.08	−5.80
Greens	Tim White	6,335	6.98	+1.87
Family First	Richard Bunting	1,925	2.12	−0.13
Democrats	Jen Williams	1,818	2.00	+0.43
What Women Want	Heidi Robins	662	0.73	+0.73
Independent	Clinton Duncan	619	0.68	+0.68
Liberty & Democracy	James Warry	171	0.19	+0.19
Total formal votes		90,704	96.16	+3.09
Informal votes		3,618	3.84	−3.09
Turnout		94,322	95.33	+0.62
Two-party-preferred result
Labor	Steve Georganas	49,937	55.05	+4.99
Liberal	Rita Bouras	40,767	44.95	−4.99
Labor hold		Swing	+4.99	

==== 2004 ====
2004 Australian federal election: Hindmarsh
Party	Candidate	Votes	%	±%
Liberal	Simon Birmingham	39,869	45.88	+0.81
Labor	Steve Georganas	36,786	42.33	+3.54
Greens	Tim White	4,437	5.11	+1.49
Family First	Trevor Grace	1,953	2.25	+2.25
Democrats	Nicole Prince	1,366	1.57	−7.46
Independent	Joe Ienco	1,130	1.30	+1.30
One Nation	Barbara Pannach	490	0.56	−2.85
Independent	Tony Musolino	478	0.55	+0.55
Independent	Bill Thomas	397	0.46	+0.46
Total formal votes		86,906	93.07	−1.23
Informal votes		6,470	6.93	+1.23
Turnout		93,376	94.71	−1.82
Two-party-preferred result
Labor	Steve Georganas	43,507	50.06	+1.02
Liberal	Simon Birmingham	43,399	49.94	−1.02
Labor gain from Liberal		Swing	+1.02	

==== 2001 ====
2001 Australian federal election: Hindmarsh
Party	Candidate	Votes	%	±%
Liberal	Chris Gallus	35,117	46.04	+2.76
Labor	Steve Georganas	29,187	38.26	−0.93
Democrats	Caroline Dowd	6,764	8.87	+1.45
Greens	Deb Cashel	2,757	3.61	+0.92
One Nation	Peter Fitzpatrick	2,458	3.22	−3.80
Total formal votes		76,283	94.22	−1.21
Informal votes		4,677	5.78	+1.21
Turnout		80,960	95.79	
Two-party-preferred result
Liberal	Chris Gallus	39,564	51.86	+0.63
Labor	Steve Georganas	36,719	48.14	−0.63
Liberal hold		Swing	+0.63	

=== Elections in the 1990s ===
==== 1998 ====
1998 Australian federal election: Hindmarsh
Party	Candidate	Votes	%	±%
Liberal	Chris Gallus	33,031	43.28	−8.68
Labor	Steve Georganas	29,912	39.19	+3.44
Democrats	Neil Raw	5,659	7.41	+0.31
One Nation	Colin Gibson	5,362	7.03	+7.03
Greens	Deb Cashel	2,058	2.70	+0.23
Natural Law	Sandra Dunning	302	0.40	−0.05
Total formal votes		76,324	95.43	−0.48
Informal votes		3,656	4.57	+0.48
Turnout		79,980	95.64	−0.14
Two-party-preferred result
Liberal	Chris Gallus	39,100	51.23	−6.83
Labor	Steve Georganas	37,224	48.77	+6.83
Liberal hold		Swing	−6.83	

==== 1996 ====
1996 Australian federal election: Hindmarsh
Party	Candidate	Votes	%	±%
Liberal	Chris Gallus	40,054	51.96	+4.27
Labor	David Abfalter	27,560	35.75	−5.30
Democrats	Pat Macaskill	5,476	7.10	+2.28
Greens	Matt Fisher	1,904	2.47	+0.60
	Andrew Phillips	992	1.29	+1.29
Democratic Socialist	Melanie Sjoberg	754	0.98	+0.46
Natural Law	Heather Lorenzon	347	0.45	−1.55
Total formal votes		77,087	95.91	+0.80
Informal votes		3,287	4.09	−0.80
Turnout		80,374	95.78	+1.13
Two-party-preferred result
Liberal	Chris Gallus	44,576	58.06	+6.42
Labor	David Abfalter	32,203	41.94	−6.42
Liberal hold		Swing	+6.42	

==== 1993 ====
1993 Australian federal election: Hindmarsh
Party	Candidate	Votes	%	±%
Liberal	Chris Gallus	38,117	47.68	+5.58
Labor	John Rau	32,814	41.05	+0.32
Democrats	Mark Lobban	3,855	4.82	−7.93
Natural Law	Athena Yiossis	1,602	2.00	+2.00
Greens	Bob Lamb	1,496	1.87	+1.87
Independent	Cliff Boyd	579	0.72	+0.72
Grey Power	Martin Stretton	577	0.72	−1.21
Independent	Ron Dean	477	0.60	+0.60
Democratic Socialist	Melanie Sjoberg	418	0.52	+0.52
Total formal votes		79,935	95.11	−0.72
Informal votes		4,111	4.89	+0.72
Turnout		84,046	94.65	
Two-party-preferred result
Liberal	Chris Gallus	41,245	51.64	+2.61
Labor	John Rau	38,627	48.36	−2.61
Liberal gain from Labor		Swing	+2.61	

==== 1990 ====
1990 Australian federal election: Hindmarsh
Party	Candidate	Votes	%	±%
Labor	John Scott	29,212	43.8	−5.2
Liberal	Barry Lewis	24,836	37.3	−0.6
Democrats	Stephen Crabbe	9,070	13.6	+5.3
Grey Power	John Maguire	1,848	2.8	+2.8
Call to Australia	Peter Sparrow	1,072	1.6	+1.6
Independent	Alan McCarthy	418	0.6	+0.6
Independent	David Moxham	178	0.3	+0.3
Total formal votes		66,634	94.9	
Informal votes		3,558	5.1	
Turnout		70,192	95.6	
Two-party-preferred result
Labor	John Scott	36,801	55.3	+0.2
Liberal	Barry Lewis	29,717	44.7	−0.2
Labor hold		Swing	+0.2	

=== Elections in the 1980s ===
==== 1987 ====
1987 Australian federal election: Hindmarsh
Party	Candidate	Votes	%	±%
Labor	John Scott	30,782	49.0	−2.6
Liberal	Barry Lewis	23,792	37.9	+0.3
Democrats	Jim Mitchell	5,239	8.3	−1.7
National	Glenn Jarvis	2,074	3.3	+3.3
Independent	Sofia Mavrogeorgis	544	0.9	+0.9
Unite Australia	Stewart Clarke	405	0.6	+0.6
Total formal votes		62,836	91.5	
Informal votes		5,865	8.5	
Turnout		68,701	93.2	
Two-party-preferred result
Labor	John Scott	34,615	55.1	−1.3
Liberal	Barry Lewis	28,189	44.9	+1.3
Labor hold		Swing	−1.3	

==== 1984 ====
1984 Australian federal election: Hindmarsh
Party	Candidate	Votes	%	±%
Labor	John Scott	31,595	51.6	−2.3
Liberal	Barry Lewis	23,011	37.6	+2.0
Democrats	Ian Haines	6,124	10.0	+2.4
Socialist Workers	Paul Petit	542	0.9	−2.0
Total formal votes		61,272	90.0	
Informal votes		6,781	10.0	
Turnout		68,053	94.3	
Two-party-preferred result
Labor	John Scott	34,556	56.4	−3.4
Liberal	Barry Lewis	26,707	43.6	+3.4
Labor hold		Swing	−3.4	

==== 1983 ====
1983 Australian federal election: Hindmarsh
Party	Candidate	Votes	%	±%
Labor	John Scott	39,496	53.7	+5.7
Liberal	Barry Lewis	26,280	35.8	−2.7
Democrats	Jim Mitchell	5,592	7.6	−1.6
Socialist Workers	Lotus Cavagnino	2,139	2.9	+0.7
Total formal votes		73,507	96.9	
Informal votes		2,352	3.1	
Turnout		75,859	95.2	
Two-party-preferred result
Labor	John Scott		60.0	+3.8
Liberal	Barry Lewis		40.0	−3.8
Labor hold		Swing	+3.8	

==== 1980 ====
1980 Australian federal election: Hindmarsh
Party	Candidate	Votes	%	±%
Labor	John Scott	34,106	48.0	−7.2
Liberal	George Basisovs	27,379	38.5	+6.0
Democrats	Peter Gagliardi	6,535	9.2	−3.0
Socialist Workers	Therese Doyle	1,531	2.2	+2.2
Independent	Alf Gard	1,500	2.1	+2.1
Total formal votes		71,051	96.1	
Informal votes		2,891	3.9	
Turnout		73,942	95.1	
Two-party-preferred result
Labor	John Scott		56.2	−5.1
Liberal	George Basisovs		43.8	+5.1
Labor hold		Swing	−5.1	

=== Elections in the 1970s ===
==== 1977 ====
1977 Australian federal election: Hindmarsh
Party	Candidate	Votes	%	±%
Labor	Clyde Cameron	38,976	55.2	+0.8
Liberal	Gregory Molfetas	22,962	32.5	−6.8
Democrats	James Evans	8,628	12.2	+12.2
Total formal votes		70,566	95.8	
Informal votes		3,061	4.2	
Turnout		73,627	95.4	
Two-party-preferred result
Labor	Clyde Cameron		61.3	+5.0
Liberal	Gregory Molfetas		38.7	−5.0
Labor hold		Swing	+5.0	

==== 1975 ====
1975 Australian federal election: Hindmarsh
Party	Candidate	Votes	%	±%
Labor	Clyde Cameron	32,978	54.4	−8.5
Liberal	Valentine Dignum	23,806	39.3	+11.7
Liberal Movement	Ian McGowan	2,982	4.9	−2.7
Independent	Ross Stanford	809	1.3	+1.3
Total formal votes		60,575	97.0	
Informal votes		1,857	3.0	
Turnout		62,432	96.0	
Two-party-preferred result
Labor	Clyde Cameron		56.3	−9.6
Liberal	Valentine Dignum		43.7	+9.6
Labor hold		Swing	−9.6	

==== 1974 ====
1974 Australian federal election: Hindmarsh
Party	Candidate	Votes	%	±%
Labor	Clyde Cameron	37,106	62.9	+0.2
Liberal	Iris MacDonald	16,311	27.6	−4.2
Liberal Movement	Kelvin Schultz	4,508	7.6	+7.6
Australia	Wayne Kelly	1,087	1.8	+1.8
Total formal votes		59,012	96.5	
Informal votes		2,115	3.5	
Turnout		61,127	96.2	
Two-party-preferred result
Labor	Clyde Cameron		65.9	+2.1
Liberal	Iris MacDonald		34.1	−2.1
Labor hold		Swing	+2.1	

==== 1972 ====
1972 Australian federal election: Hindmarsh
Party	Candidate	Votes	%	±%
Labor	Clyde Cameron	33,551	62.7	−5.3
Liberal	Ivan Denchev	17,009	31.8	+3.3
Democratic Labor	Paul Hubert	2,935	5.5	+2.6
Total formal votes		53,495	96.7	
Informal votes		1,827	3.3	
Turnout		55,322	96.0	
Two-party-preferred result
Labor	Clyde Cameron		63.8	−5.0
Liberal	Ivan Denchev		36.2	+5.0
Labor hold		Swing	−5.0	

=== Elections in the 1960s ===
==== 1969 ====
1969 Australian federal election: Hindmarsh
Party	Candidate	Votes	%	±%
Labor	Clyde Cameron	34,346	68.0	+14.8
Liberal	Michael Cusack	14,402	28.5	−14.6
Democratic Labor	Helena Hubert	1,479	2.9	−0.9
Independent	Steven Gazecimeon	245	0.5	+0.5
Total formal votes		50,472	95.4	
Informal votes		2,413	4.6	
Turnout		52,885	95.8	
Two-party-preferred result
Labor	Clyde Cameron		68.8	+14.8
Liberal	Michael Cusack		31.2	−14.8
Labor hold		Swing	+14.8	

==== 1966 ====
1966 Australian federal election: Hindmarsh
Party	Candidate	Votes	%	±%
Labor	Clyde Cameron	26,096	50.9	−21.0
Liberal	Ross Stanford	23,255	45.4	+45.4
Democratic Labor	Cyril Holasek	1,927	3.8	−24.3
Total formal votes		51,278	96.5	
Informal votes		1,834	3.5	
Turnout		53,112	96.3	
Two-party-preferred result
Labor	Clyde Cameron		51.7	−20.2
Liberal	Ross Stanford		48.3	+48.3
Labor hold		Swing	−20.2	

==== 1963 ====
1963 Australian federal election: Hindmarsh
Party	Candidate	Votes	%	±%
Labor	Clyde Cameron	33,975	71.9	+4.0
Democratic Labor	Richard Mills	13,281	28.1	+23.5
Total formal votes		47,256	94.8	
Informal votes		2,587	5.2	
Turnout		49,843	95.8	
Labor hold		Swing	+3.1	

==== 1961 ====
1961 Australian federal election: Hindmarsh
Party	Candidate	Votes	%	±%
Labor	Clyde Cameron	31,194	67.9	+5.5
Liberal	Karl-Juergen Liebetrau	12,619	27.5	−3.7
Democratic Labor	Cyril Holasek	2,097	4.6	−1.8
Total formal votes		45,910	96.7	
Informal votes		1,563	3.3	
Turnout		47,473	96.0	
Two-party-preferred result
Labor	Clyde Cameron		68.8	+5.1
Liberal	Karl-Juergen Liebetrau		31.2	−5.1
Labor hold		Swing	+5.1	

=== Elections in the 1950s ===
==== 1958 ====
1958 Australian federal election: Hindmarsh
Party	Candidate	Votes	%	±%
Labor	Clyde Cameron	27,141	62.4	+2.2
Liberal	Alan Smith	13,550	31.2	+0.4
Democratic Labor	Francis Moran	2,771	6.4	−2.5
Total formal votes		43,462	96.6	
Informal votes		1,535	3.4	
Turnout		44,997	96.5	
Two-party-preferred result
Labor	Clyde Cameron		63.7	+1.7
Liberal	Alan Smith		36.3	−1.7
Labor hold		Swing	+1.7	

==== 1955 ====
1955 Australian federal election: Hindmarsh
Party	Candidate	Votes	%	±%
Labor	Clyde Cameron	23,828	60.2	−39.8
Liberal	Frank Potter	12,189	30.8	+30.8
Labor (A-C)	Francis Moran	3,532	8.9	+8.9
Total formal votes		39,549	95.6	
Informal votes		1,736	4.2	
Turnout		41,285	96.2	
Two-party-preferred result
Labor	Clyde Cameron		62.0	−38.0
Liberal	Frank Potter		38.0	+38.0
Labor hold		Swing	−38.0	

==== 1954 ====
1954 Australian federal election: Hindmarsh
Party	Candidate	Votes	%	±%
Labor	Clyde Cameron	unopposed		
Labor hold		Swing		

==== 1951 ====
1951 Australian federal election: Hindmarsh
Party	Candidate	Votes	%	±%
Labor	Clyde Cameron	unopposed		
Labor hold		Swing		

=== Elections in the 1940s ===
==== 1949 ====
1949 Australian federal election: Hindmarsh
Party	Candidate	Votes	%	±%
Labor	Clyde Cameron	29,260	69.7	+2.8
Liberal	Albert Turnbull	12,736	30.3	+6.4
Total formal votes		41,996	97.5	
Informal votes		1,096	2.5	
Turnout		43,092	97.1	
Labor hold		Swing	−5.4	

==== 1946 ====
1946 Australian federal election: Hindmarsh
Party	Candidate	Votes	%	±%
Labor	Albert Thompson	52,475	68.4	−8.4
Liberal	William Palmer	16,462	21.5	−1.7
Communist	Alan Finger	7,731	10.1	+10.1
Total formal votes		76,668	96.3	
Informal votes		2,931	3.7	
Turnout		79,599	95.2	
Two-party-preferred result
Labor	Albert Thompson		76.5	−0.3
Liberal	William Palmer		23.5	+0.3
Labor hold		Swing	−0.3	

==== 1943 ====
1943 Australian federal election: Hindmarsh
Party	Candidate	Votes	%	±%
Labor	Norman Makin	56,359	76.8	+11.1
United Australia	James Butler	17,030	23.2	−11.1
Total formal votes		73,389	97.6	
Informal votes		1,824	2.4	
Turnout		75,213	97.5	
Labor hold		Swing	+11.1	

==== 1940 ====
1940 Australian federal election: Hindmarsh
Party	Candidate	Votes	%	±%
Labor	Norman Makin	41,718	65.7	−5.0
United Australia	Harry Hatwell	21,758	34.3	+5.0
Total formal votes		63,476	96.2	
Informal votes		2,530	3.8	
Turnout		66,006	95.6	
Labor hold		Swing	−5.0	

=== Elections in the 1930s ===
==== 1937 ====
1937 Australian federal election: Hindmarsh
Party	Candidate	Votes	%	±%
Labor	Norman Makin	43,215	70.7	+8.8
United Australia	Harry Hatwell	17,918	29.3	+29.3
Total formal votes		61,133	95.8	
Informal votes		2,662	4.2	
Turnout		63,795	97.1	
Labor hold		Swing	+4.0	

==== 1934 ====
1934 Australian federal election: Hindmarsh
Party	Candidate	Votes	%	±%
Labor	Norman Makin	34,275	61.9	+8.0
Independent	Ernest Evans	13,329	24.1	+24.1
Social Credit	Charles Brock	6,787	12.3	+12.3
Communist	Tom Garland	1,011	1.8	+1.8
Total formal votes		55,402	93.6	
Informal votes		3,790	6.4	
Turnout		59,192	94.8	
Two-party-preferred result
Labor	Norman Makin		66.7	+9.2
Independent	Ernest Evans		33.3	+33.3
Labor hold		Swing	+9.2	

==== 1931 ====
1931 Australian federal election: Hindmarsh
Party	Candidate	Votes	%	±%
Labor	Norman Makin	28,047	54.7	−45.3
Emergency Committee	Ernest Evans	20,657	40.3	+40.3
Lang Labor	Sid O'Flaherty	2,524	4.9	+4.9
Total formal votes		51,228	95.7	
Informal votes		2,301	4.3	
Turnout		53,529	96.2	
Two-party-preferred result
Labor	Norman Makin		58.4	−41.6
Emergency Committee	Ernest Evans		41.6	+41.6
Labor hold		Swing	−41.6	

=== Elections in the 1920s ===
==== 1929 ====
1929 Australian federal election: Hindmarsh
Party	Candidate	Votes	%	±%
Labor	Norman Makin	unopposed		
Labor hold		Swing		

==== 1928 ====
1928 Australian federal election: Hindmarsh
Party	Candidate	Votes	%	±%
Labor	Norman Makin	33,241	70.6	+5.4
Nationalist	Henry Dunks	8,748	18.6	−16.2
Independent	Ross Graham	5,081	10.8	+10.8
Total formal votes		47,070	91.1	
Informal votes		4,626	8.9	
Turnout		51,696	94.7	
Two-party-preferred result
Labor	Norman Makin		73.3	+8.1
Nationalist	Henry Dunks		26.7	−8.1
Labor hold		Swing	+8.1	

==== 1925 ====
1925 Australian federal election: Hindmarsh
Party	Candidate	Votes	%	±%
Labor	Norman Makin	29,097	65.2	−3.4
Nationalist	John Verran	15,504	34.8	+3.4
Total formal votes		44,601	95.6	
Informal votes		2,058	4.4	
Turnout		46,659	94.3	
Labor hold		Swing	−3.4	

==== 1922 ====
1922 Australian federal election: Hindmarsh
Party	Candidate	Votes	%	±%
Labor	Norman Makin	15,111	68.6	+14.6
Nationalist	Charles Hayter	6,925	31.4	−14.6
Total formal votes		22,036	94.0	
Informal votes		1,409	6.0	
Turnout		23,445	54.1	
Labor hold		Swing	+14.6	

=== Elections in the 1910s ===
==== 1919 ====
1919 Australian federal election: Hindmarsh
Party	Candidate	Votes	%	±%
Labor	Norman Makin	17,195	51.4	+7.2
Nationalist	William Archibald	16,279	48.6	−7.2
Total formal votes		33,474	97.4	
Informal votes		906	2.6	
Turnout		34,380	69.1	
Labor gain from Nationalist		Swing	+7.2	

==== 1917 ====
1917 Australian federal election: Hindmarsh
Party	Candidate	Votes	%	±%
Nationalist	William Archibald	19,174	55.8	+30.2
Labor	James Cavanagh	15,177	44.2	−30.2
Total formal votes		34,351	96.5	
Informal votes		1,264	3.5	
Turnout		35,615	74.9	
Nationalist gain from Labor		Swing	+30.2	

==== 1914 ====
1914 Australian federal election: Hindmarsh
Party	Candidate	Votes	%	±%
Labor	William Archibald	25,913	74.4	−25.6
Liberal	James Craig	8,895	25.6	+25.6
Total formal votes		34,808	97.6	
Informal votes		839	2.4	
Turnout		35,647	77.8	
Labor hold		Swing	−25.6	

==== 1913 ====
1913 Australian federal election: Hindmarsh
Party	Candidate	Votes	%	±%
Labor	William Archibald	unopposed		
Labor hold		Swing		

==== 1910 ====
1910 Australian federal election: Hindmarsh
Party	Candidate	Votes	%	±%
Labour	William Archibald	unopposed		
Labour hold		Swing		

=== Elections in the 1900s ===
==== 1906 ====
1906 Australian federal election: Hindmarsh
Party	Candidate	Votes	%	±%
Labour	James Hutchison	unopposed		
Labour hold		Swing		

==== 1903 ====
1903 Australian federal election: Hindmarsh
Party	Candidate	Votes	%	±%
Labour	James Hutchison	6,003	66.7	+66.7
Protectionist	James Shaw	3,000	33.3	+33.3
Total formal votes		9,003	97.1	
Informal votes		266	2.9	
Turnout		9,269	37.9	
Labour win		(new seat)		
