= Electoral results for the Division of Hawker =

Australian division election results

This is a list of electoral results for the Division of Hawker in Australian federal elections from the division's creation in 1969 until its abolition in 1993.

== Members ==
Member	Party	Term
Ralph Jacobi	Labor	1969–1987
Elizabeth Harvey	Labor	1987–1990
Chris Gallus	Liberal	1990–1993

== Election results ==
=== Elections in the 1990s ===
==== 1990 ====
1990 Australian federal election: Hawker
Party	Candidate	Votes	%	±%
Liberal	Chris Gallus	28,348	43.1	−0.8
Labor	Elizabeth Harvey	26,641	40.5	−5.7
Democrats	Elizabeth Williams	8,362	12.7	+5.8
Call to Australia	Reg Macey	1,266	1.9	+1.9
Grey Power	Glen Bottam	702	1.1	+1.1
Democratic Socialist	Kathy Ragless	477	0.7	+0.7
Total formal votes		65,796	96.7	
Informal votes		2,270	3.3	
Turnout		68,066	95.8	
Two-party-preferred result
Liberal	Chris Gallus	32,845	50.0	−1.2
Labor	Elizabeth Harvey	32,831	50.0	+1.2
Liberal gain from Labor		Swing	+1.2	

=== Elections in the 1980s ===
==== 1987 ====
1987 Australian federal election: Hawker
Party	Candidate	Votes	%	±%
Labor	Elizabeth Harvey	29,560	46.2	−3.0
Liberal	Kim Jacobs	28,116	43.9	+2.4
Democrats	Graham Pamount	4,439	6.9	−0.8
National	David Dwyer	1,203	1.9	+0.2
Unite Australia	Keith Draper	719	1.1	+1.1
Total formal votes		64,037	94.1	
Informal votes		3,991	5.9	
Turnout		68,028	93.6	
Two-party-preferred result
Labor	Elizabeth Harvey	32,782	51.2	−2.2
Liberal	Kim Jacobs	31,243	48.8	+2.2
Labor hold		Swing	−2.2	

==== 1984 ====
1984 Australian federal election: Hawker
Party	Candidate	Votes	%	±%
Labor	Ralph Jacobi	30,956	49.2	−0.2
Liberal	Charles Campbell	26,101	41.5	+0.0
Democrats	Graham Pamount	4,852	7.7	+0.9
National	Thomas Correll	1,045	1.7	+1.7
Total formal votes		62,954	92.4	
Informal votes		5,171	7.6	
Turnout		68,125	94.6	
Two-party-preferred result
Labor	Ralph Jacobi	33,594	53.4	−1.2
Liberal	Charles Campbell	29,341	46.6	+1.2
Labor hold		Swing	−1.2	

==== 1983 ====
1983 Australian federal election: Hawker
Party	Candidate	Votes	%	±%
Labor	Ralph Jacobi	36,483	52.1	+2.7
Liberal	Bruce Harry	27,211	38.8	−3.5
Democrats	Graham Pamount	4,792	6.8	−1.5
Socialist Workers	John Garcia	1,568	2.2	+2.2
Total formal votes		70,054	97.5	
Informal votes		1,769	2.5	
Turnout		71,823	93.8	
Two-party-preferred result
Labor	Ralph Jacobi		57.3	+3.5
Liberal	Bruce Harry		42.7	−3.5
Labor hold		Swing	+3.5	

==== 1980 ====
1980 Australian federal election: Hawker
Party	Candidate	Votes	%	±%
Labor	Ralph Jacobi	34,066	49.4	+4.6
Liberal	Mark Hanckel	29,187	42.3	−1.7
Democrats	Kenneth Johnson	5,720	8.3	−1.9
Total formal votes		68,973	97.7	
Informal votes		1,590	2.3	
Turnout		70,563	94.7	
Two-party-preferred result
Labor	Ralph Jacobi	37,073	53.8	+3.2
Liberal	Mark Hanckel	31,900	46.2	−3.2
Labor hold		Swing	+3.2	

=== Elections in the 1970s ===
==== 1977 ====
1977 Australian federal election: Hawker
Party	Candidate	Votes	%	±%
Labor	Ralph Jacobi	31,685	44.8	−2.2
Liberal	Steele Hall	31,062	44.0	−2.4
Democrats	Bruce Miels	7,190	10.2	+10.2
Independent	Warren Wallace	724	1.0	+1.0
Total formal votes		70,661	97.0	
Informal votes		2,206	3.0	
Turnout		72,867	94.3	
Two-party-preferred result
Labor	Ralph Jacobi	35,760	50.6	+2.0
Liberal	Steele Hall	34,901	49.4	−2.0
Labor notional gain from Liberal		Swing	+2.0	

Ralph Jacobi (Labor) was the sitting member, however the effect of the 1977 redistribution was to give the Liberals a notional majority of 1.4%.

==== 1975 ====
1975 Australian federal election: Hawker
Party	Candidate	Votes	%	±%
Labor	Ralph Jacobi	29,036	49.4	−6.2
Liberal	Craig Speil	25,842	44.0	+12.9
Liberal Movement	Stewart Leggett	3,890	6.6	−5.2
Total formal votes		58,768	97.9	
Informal votes		1,291	2.1	
Turnout		60,059	96.5	
Two-party-preferred result
Labor	Ralph Jacobi	29,974	51.0	−9.2
Liberal	Craig Speil	28,794	49.0	+9.2
Labor hold		Swing	−9.2	

==== 1974 ====
1974 Australian federal election: Hawker
Party	Candidate	Votes	%	±%
Labor	Ralph Jacobi	31,735	55.6	−0.9
Liberal	Henry Winter	17,717	31.1	−5.6
Liberal Movement	Peter Holder	6,744	11.8	+11.8
Australia	Phillip Vickery	849	1.5	+1.5
Total formal votes		57,045	97.5	
Informal votes		1,481	2.5	
Turnout		58,526	96.3	
Two-party-preferred result
Labor	Ralph Jacobi		60.2	+1.3
Liberal	Henry Winter		39.8	−1.3
Labor hold		Swing	+1.3	

==== 1972 ====
1972 Australian federal election: Hawker
Party	Candidate	Votes	%	±%
Labor	Ralph Jacobi	29,778	56.5	+0.7
Liberal	Phyllis Rogers	19,323	36.7	−1.0
Independent	John Steele	1,859	3.5	+3.5
Democratic Labor	James Kiley	1,754	3.3	−0.7
Total formal votes		52,714	97.7	
Informal votes		1,229	2.3	
Turnout		53,943	96.2	
Two-party-preferred result
Labor	Ralph Jacobi		58.9	+1.0
Liberal	Phyllis Rogers		41.1	−1.0
Labor hold		Swing	+1.0	

=== Elections in the 1960s ===
==== 1969 ====
1969 Australian federal election: Hawker
Party	Candidate	Votes	%	±%
Labor	Ralph Jacobi	28,305	55.8	+12.1
Liberal	Alan Hickinbotham	19,086	37.7	−13.5
Democratic Labor	Kathleen Anderson	2,020	4.0	−1.1
Australia	Malcolm Hawkins	1,272	2.5	+2.5
Total formal votes		50,683	97.2	
Informal votes		1,486	2.8	
Turnout		52,169	96.3	
Two-party-preferred result
Labor	Ralph Jacobi		57.9	+13.7
Liberal	Alan Hickinbotham		42.1	−13.7
Labor notional gain from Liberal		Swing	+13.7	
