= Post-election pendulum for the 1983 Australian federal election =

The Mackerras pendulum as a way of predicting the outcome of an election contested between two major parties in a Westminster style lower house legislature such as the Australian House of Representatives, which is composed of single-member electorates and which uses a preferential voting system such as a Condorcet method or instant-runoff voting.

The pendulum works by lining up all of the seats held in Parliament for the government, the opposition and the crossbenches according to the percentage point margin they are held by on a two party preferred basis. This is also known as the swing required for the seat to change hands. Given a uniform swing to the opposition or government parties, the number of seats that change hands can be predicted.

Government seats (75)
Marginal
Diamond Valley	Vic	Peter Staples	ALP	0.2
Petrie	Qld	Deane Wells	ALP	0.5
Casey	Vic	Peter Steedman	ALP	0.7
Flinders	Vic	Bob Chynoweth	ALP	1.0
Eden-Monaro	NSW	Jim Snow	ALP	1.6
Fadden	Qld	David Beddall	ALP	1.7
Phillip	NSW	Jeannette McHugh	ALP	1.9
Northern Territory	NT	John Reeves	ALP	1.9
Macarthur	NSW	Colin Hollis	ALP	2.1
Deakin	Vic	John Saunderson	ALP	2.1
Leichhardt	Qld	John Gayler	ALP	2.1
Barton	NSW	Gary Punch	ALP	2.2
Chisholm	Vic	Helen Mayer	ALP	2.2
Bowman	Qld	Len Keogh	ALP	2.2
Bendigo	Vic	John Brumby	ALP	2.8
Herbert	Qld	Ted Lindsay	ALP	2.8
Calare	NSW	David Simmons	ALP	3.0
McMillan	Vic	Barry Cunningham	ALP	3.1
Kingston	SA	Gordon Bilney	ALP	3.1
Tangney	WA	George Gear	ALP	3.2
Ballarat	Vic	John Mildren	ALP	4.1
Lowe	NSW	Michael Maher	ALP	5.9
Fairly safe
Grey	SA	Lloyd O'Neil	ALP	6.1
Perth	WA	Ric Charlesworth	ALP	6.4
Brisbane	Qld	Manfred Cross	ALP	6.9
Stirling	WA	Ron Edwards	ALP	7.0
Moore	WA	Allen Blanchard	ALP	7.2
Hawker	SA	Ralph Jacobi	ALP	7.3
Canning	WA	Wendy Fatin	ALP	7.4
Henty	Vic	Joan Child	ALP	7.5
Isaacs	Vic	David Charles	ALP	9.0
Lilley	Qld	Elaine Darling	ALP	9.2
Robertson	NSW	Barry Cohen	ALP	9.3
Kalgoorlie	WA	Graeme Campbell	ALP	9.5
Capricornia	Qld	Doug Everingham	ALP	9.9
Hindmarsh	SA	John Scott	ALP	10.0
Safe
Hotham	Vic	Lewis Kent	ALP	10.1
St George	NSW	Bill Morrison	ALP	10.5
La Trobe	Vic	Peter Milton	ALP	10.9
Banks	NSW	John Mountford	ALP	11.1
Macquarie	NSW	Ross Free	ALP	11.8
Holt	Vic	Michael Duffy	ALP	12.6
Adelaide	SA	Chris Hurford	ALP	12.6
Corio	Vic	Gordon Scholes	ALP	13.0
Grayndler	NSW	Leo McLeay	ALP	13.2
Maribyrnong	Vic	Alan Griffiths	ALP	13.8
Canberra	ACT	Ros Kelly	ALP	13.9
Melbourne Ports	Vic	Clyde Holding	ALP	14.1
Griffith	Qld	Ben Humphreys	ALP	14.5
Blaxland	NSW	Paul Keating	ALP	15.0
Prospect	NSW	Dick Klugman	ALP	15.2
Burke	Vic	Andrew Theophanous	ALP	15.5
Bonython	SA	Neal Blewett	ALP	15.8
Swan	WA	Kim Beazley	ALP	16.2
Fremantle	WA	John Dawkins	ALP	16.5
Parramatta	NSW	John Brown	ALP	17.2
Newcastle	NSW	Allan Morris	ALP	17.5
Reid	NSW	Tom Uren	ALP	17.6
Fraser	ACT	Ken Fry	ALP	18.0
Hughes	NSW	Les Johnson	ALP	18.3
Cunningham	NSW	Stewart West	ALP	18.6
Werriwa	NSW	John Kerin	ALP	19.1
Very safe
Melbourne	Vic	Gerry Hand	ALP	20.2
Oxley	Qld	Bill Hayden	ALP	20.7
Shortland	NSW	Peter Morris	ALP	20.8
Lalor	Vic	Barry Jones	ALP	21.8
Chifley	NSW	Russ Gorman	ALP	22.4
Hunter	NSW	Bob Brown	ALP	22.6
Scullin	Vic	Harry Jenkins, Sr.	ALP	22.6
Kingsford Smith	NSW	Lionel Bowen	ALP	23.5
Wills	Vic	Bob Hawke	ALP	24.1
Port Adelaide	SA	Mick Young	ALP	24.2
Sydney	NSW	Peter Baldwin	ALP	25.7
Gellibrand	Vic	Ralph Willis	ALP	25.9
Batman	Vic	Brian Howe	ALP	27.1

Opposition seats (50)
Marginal
Cook	NSW	Don Dobie	LIB	0.1
Riverina	NSW	Noel Hicks	NAT	0.4
Bruce	Vic	Billy Snedden	LIB	0.7
Dawson	Qld	Ray Braithwaite	NAT	1.2
Forrest	WA	Peter Drummond	LIB	1.4
Moreton	Qld	James Killen	LIB	1.6
Wide Bay	Qld	Clarrie Millar	NAT	1.9
Sturt	SA	Ian Wilson	LIB	2.0
Cowper	NSW	Ian Robinson	NAT	2.1
Dundas	NSW	Philip Ruddock	LIB	2.7
New England	NSW	Ian Sinclair	NAT	2.7
Balaclava	Vic	Ian Macphee	LIB	3.4
Franklin	Tas	Bruce Goodluck	LIB	3.5
Curtin	WA	Allan Rocher	LIB	4.5
Wilmot	Tas	Max Burr	LIB	5.1
Lyne	NSW	Bruce Cowan	NAT	5.3
Bennelong	NSW	John Howard	LIB	5.7
Denison	Tas	Michael Hodgman	LIB	5.8
Paterson	NSW	Frank O'Keefe	NAT	5.9
Richmond	NSW	Doug Anthony	NAT	5.9
Fairly safe
Hume	NSW	Stephen Lusher	NAT	6.8
Fisher	Qld	Evan Adermann	NAT	7.1
Ryan	Qld	John Moore	LIB	7.5
Higgins	Vic	Roger Shipton	LIB	8.0
Corangamite	Vic	Tony Street	LIB	8.2
Bass	Tas	Kevin Newman	LIB	8.3
Mackellar	NSW	Jim Carlton	LIB	8.3
Gwydir	NSW	Ralph Hunt	NAT	8.8
Kooyong	Vic	Andrew Peacock	LIB	9.1
Kennedy	Qld	Bob Katter, Sr.	NAT	9.1
Farrer	NSW	Wal Fife	LIB	9.2
Gippsland	Vic	Peter McGauran	NAT	9.7
Wannon	Vic	Malcolm Fraser	LIB	9.7
Safe
Boothby	SA	Steele Hall	LIB	10.1
Warringah	NSW	Michael MacKellar	LIB	10.2
McPherson	Qld	Peter White	LIB	10.3
North Sydney	NSW	John Spender	LIB	10.4
Mitchell	NSW	Alan Cadman	LIB	10.5
Indi	Vic	Ewen Cameron	LIB	10.6
Wentworth	NSW	Peter Coleman	LIB	12.4
Braddon	Tas	Ray Groom	LIB	12.6
Wakefield	SA	Neil Andrew	LIB	13.7
Barker	SA	James Porter	LIB	13.8
Berowra	NSW	Harry Edwards	LIB	13.9
Darling Downs	Qld	Tom McVeigh	NAT	14.0
O'Connor	WA	Wilson Tuckey	LIB	14.1
Maranoa	Qld	Ian Cameron	NAT	16.2
Very safe
Murray	Vic	Bruce Lloyd	NAT	21.3
Mallee	Vic	Peter Fisher	NAT	22.0
Bradfield	NSW	David Connolly	LIB	24.7
