= Results of the 2013 Australian federal election in South Australia =

2013 Australian federal election
- 7 September 2013

All 11 South Australian seats in the Australian House of Representatives and 6 (of the 12) seats in the Australian Senate
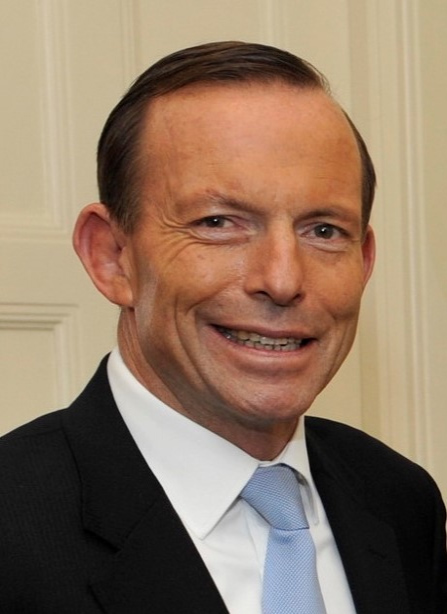

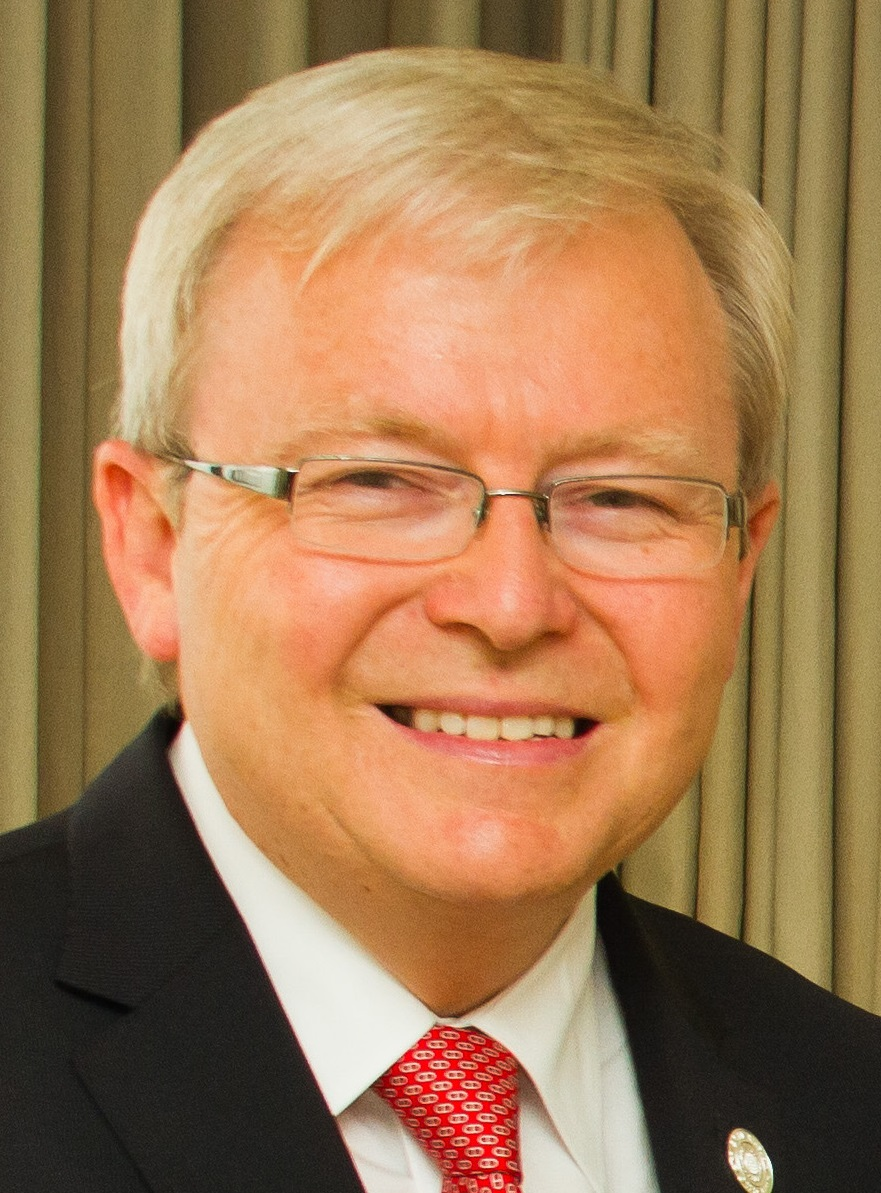
| | First party | Second party |
|---|---|---|
| Leader | Tony Abbott | Kevin Rudd |
| Party | Coalition | Labor |
| Last election | 5 | 6 |
| Seats won | 6 | 5 |
| Seat change | ▲1 | ▼1 |
| Popular vote | 447,286 | 359,273 |
| Percentage | 44.9% | 35.73% |
| Swing | ▲4.28 | ▼5.01 |
| TPP | 52.36% | 47.64% |
| TPP swing | ▲5.54 | ▼5.54 |
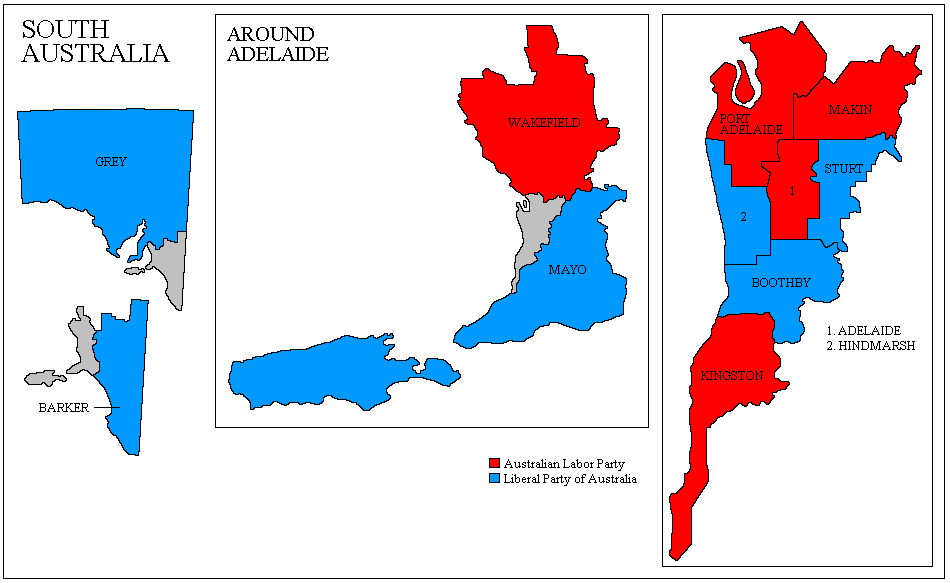
- Results by electorate

This is a list of electoral division results for the 2013 Australian federal election in the state of South Australia.

== Overall results ==
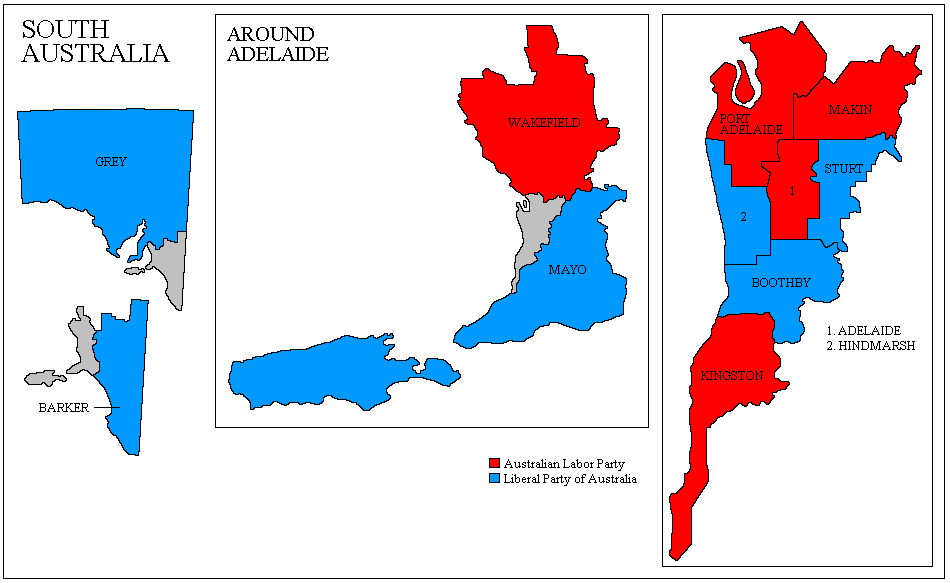
Electoral divisions: South Australia

| Party | Votes | % | Swing | Seats | Change |
|---|---|---|---|---|---|
| Liberal Party of Australia | 447,286 | 44.49 | +4.28 | 6 | ▲1 |
| Australian Labor Party | 359,273 | 35.73 | –5.01 | 5 | ▼1 |
| Australian Greens | 83,252 | 8.28 | –3.70 | | |
| Family First Party | 54,409 | 5.41 | +0.45 | | |
| Palmer United Party | 37,981 | 3.78 | +3.78 | | |
| National Party (SA) | 4,021 | 0.40 | +0.40 | | |
| Katter's Australian Party | 2,268 | 0.23 | +0.23 | | |
| Rise Up Australia Party | 1,191 | 0.12 | +0.12 | | |
| Australia First Party | 1,116 | 0.11 | +0.11 | | |
| Socialist Alliance | 980 | 0.10 | +0.02 | | |
| Democratic Labour Party | 834 | 0.08 | +0.08 | | |
| Independents | 12,834 | 1.28 | +0.76 | | |
| Total | 1,005,445 | | | 11 | |
Two-party-preferred vote
| Liberal/National Coalition | 526,493 | 52.36 | +5.54 | 6 | ▲1 |
| Australian Labor Party | 478,952 | 47.64 | –5.54 | 5 | ▼1 |

== Results by division ==
=== Adelaide ===
2013 Australian federal election: Adelaide
| Party | Candidate | Votes | % | ±% |
|---|---|---|---|---|
| Labor | Kate Ellis | 38,650 | 42.26 | −1.52 |
| Liberal | Carmen Garcia | 38,463 | 42.06 | +4.31 |
| Greens | Ruth Beach | 9,251 | 10.12 | −3.50 |
| Family First | Peter Lee | 2,169 | 2.37 | +0.18 |
| Palmer United | Vincent Scali | 1,943 | 2.12 | +2.12 |
| Socialist Alliance | Liah Lazarou | 980 | 1.07 | +0.18 |
| Total formal votes | | 91,456 | 96.04 | +0.86 |
| Informal votes | | 3,770 | 3.96 | −0.86 |
| Turnout | | 95,226 | 92.47 | −0.61 |
Two-party-preferred result
| Labor | Kate Ellis | 49,338 | 53.95 | −3.57 |
| Liberal | Carmen Garcia | 42,118 | 46.05 | +3.57 |
| Labor hold | | Swing | −3.57 | |

=== Barker ===
2013 Australian federal election: Barker
| Party | Candidate | Votes | % | ±% |
|---|---|---|---|---|
| Liberal | Tony Pasin | 48,678 | 52.61 | −2.47 |
| Labor | Phil Golding | 16,993 | 18.37 | −9.62 |
| Family First | Kristin Lambert | 7,368 | 7.96 | +1.78 |
| Independent | Richard Sage | 6,617 | 7.15 | +7.15 |
| Greens | Mark Keough | 5,224 | 5.65 | −3.39 |
| National | Miles Hannemann | 4,021 | 4.35 | +4.35 |
| Palmer United | Balwinder Singh Jhandi | 3,623 | 3.92 | +3.92 |
| Total formal votes | | 92,524 | 94.62 | +0.12 |
| Informal votes | | 5,259 | 5.38 | −0.12 |
| Turnout | | 97,783 | 94.63 | −0.35 |
Two-party-preferred result
| Liberal | Tony Pasin | 61,571 | 66.55 | +3.54 |
| Labor | Phil Golding | 30,953 | 33.45 | −3.54 |
| Liberal hold | | Swing | +3.54 | |

=== Boothby ===
2013 Australian federal election: Boothby
| Party | Candidate | Votes | % | ±% |
|---|---|---|---|---|
| Liberal | Andrew Southcott | 47,484 | 50.35 | +6.08 |
| Labor | Annabel Digance | 29,018 | 30.77 | −4.81 |
| Greens | Stephen Thomas | 11,287 | 11.97 | −1.46 |
| Family First | Natasha Edmonds | 3,683 | 3.91 | +1.09 |
| Palmer United | Sally Cox | 2,835 | 3.01 | +3.01 |
| Total formal votes | | 94,307 | 96.52 | +1.24 |
| Informal votes | | 3,400 | 3.48 | −1.24 |
| Turnout | | 97,707 | 93.92 | +1.96 |
Two-party-preferred result
| Liberal | Andrew Southcott | 53,866 | 57.12 | +6.50 |
| Labor | Annabel Digance | 40,441 | 42.88 | −6.50 |
| Liberal hold | | Swing | +6.50 | |

=== Grey ===
2013 Australian federal election: Grey
| Party | Candidate | Votes | % | ±% |
|---|---|---|---|---|
| Liberal | Rowan Ramsey | 49,334 | 55.65 | −0.16 |
| Labor | Ben Browne | 24,205 | 27.30 | −3.76 |
| Family First | Cheryl Kaminski | 4,878 | 5.50 | +0.14 |
| Palmer United | Kristian Rees | 4,457 | 5.03 | +5.03 |
| Greens | Alison Sentance | 3,289 | 3.71 | −4.06 |
| Independent | Greg Fidge | 2,488 | 2.81 | +2.81 |
| Total formal votes | | 88,651 | 94.60 | −0.05 |
| Informal votes | | 5,063 | 5.40 | +0.05 |
| Turnout | | 93,714 | 93.02 | −0.53 |
Two-party-preferred result
| Liberal | Rowan Ramsey | 56,330 | 63.54 | +2.38 |
| Labor | Ben Browne | 32,321 | 36.46 | −2.38 |
| Liberal hold | | Swing | +2.38 | |

=== Hindmarsh ===
2013 Australian federal election: Hindmarsh
| Party | Candidate | Votes | % | ±% |
|---|---|---|---|---|
| Liberal | Matt Williams | 43,639 | 46.17 | +7.53 |
| Labor | Steve Georganas | 35,876 | 37.95 | −6.79 |
| Greens | Andrew Payne | 8,360 | 8.84 | −3.32 |
| Family First | Bob Randall | 2,883 | 3.05 | +0.06 |
| Palmer United | George Melissourgos | 2,332 | 2.47 | +2.47 |
| Democratic Labour | David McCabe | 834 | 0.88 | +0.88 |
| Katter's Australian | Kym McKay | 599 | 0.63 | +0.63 |
| Total formal votes | | 94,523 | 95.12 | +0.38 |
| Informal votes | | 4,847 | 4.88 | −0.38 |
| Turnout | | 99,370 | 93.05 | −1.08 |
Two-party-preferred result
| Liberal | Matt Williams | 49,048 | 51.89 | +7.97 |
| Labor | Steve Georganas | 45,475 | 48.11 | −7.97 |
| Liberal gain from Labor | | Swing | +7.97 | |

=== Kingston ===
2013 Australian federal election: Kingston
| Party | Candidate | Votes | % | ±% |
|---|---|---|---|---|
| Labor | Amanda Rishworth | 43,328 | 49.26 | −2.50 |
| Liberal | Damien Mills | 28,492 | 32.40 | +3.99 |
| Greens | Palitja Moore | 6,062 | 6.89 | −5.22 |
| Family First | Geoff Doecke | 5,168 | 5.88 | +0.08 |
| Palmer United | Mitchell Frost | 3,709 | 4.22 | +4.22 |
| Rise Up Australia | Andy Snoswell | 1,191 | 1.35 | +1.35 |
| Total formal votes | | 87,950 | 94.93 | +0.09 |
| Informal votes | | 4,697 | 5.07 | −0.09 |
| Turnout | | 92,647 | 93.80 | −0.53 |
Two-party-preferred result
| Labor | Amanda Rishworth | 52,504 | 59.70 | −4.85 |
| Liberal | Damien Mills | 35,446 | 40.30 | +4.85 |
| Labor hold | | Swing | −4.85 | |

=== Makin ===
2013 Australian federal election: Makin
| Party | Candidate | Votes | % | ±% |
|---|---|---|---|---|
| Labor | Tony Zappia | 41,873 | 45.56 | −4.70 |
| Liberal | Sue Lawrie | 34,192 | 37.20 | +6.75 |
| Family First | Mark Potter | 5,891 | 6.41 | +0.40 |
| Greens | Ami Harrison | 5,429 | 5.91 | −4.39 |
| Palmer United | Andrew Graham | 3,818 | 4.15 | +4.15 |
| Katter's Australian | Robert Jameson | 705 | 0.77 | +0.77 |
| Total formal votes | | 91,908 | 95.12 | +1.13 |
| Informal votes | | 4,717 | 4.88 | −1.13 |
| Turnout | | 96,625 | 93.97 | −0.37 |
Two-party-preferred result
| Labor | Tony Zappia | 50,604 | 55.06 | −6.94 |
| Liberal | Sue Lawrie | 41,304 | 44.94 | +6.94 |
| Labor hold | | Swing | −6.94 | |

=== Mayo ===
2013 Australian federal election: Mayo
| Party | Candidate | Votes | % | ±% |
|---|---|---|---|---|
| Liberal | Jamie Briggs | 49,195 | 53.82 | +6.94 |
| Labor | Norah Fahy | 19,325 | 21.14 | −4.05 |
| Greens | Ian Grosser | 12,931 | 14.15 | −2.86 |
| Family First | Bruce Hicks | 6,525 | 7.14 | +1.39 |
| Palmer United | Bikkar Singh Brar | 3,434 | 3.76 | +3.76 |
| Total formal votes | | 91,410 | 96.13 | +0.56 |
| Informal votes | | 3,684 | 3.87 | −0.56 |
| Turnout | | 95,094 | 94.60 | +0.14 |
Two-party-preferred result
| Liberal | Jamie Briggs | 57,141 | 62.51 | +5.22 |
| Labor | Norah Fahy | 34,269 | 37.49 | −5.22 |
| Liberal hold | | Swing | +5.22 | |

=== Port Adelaide ===
2013 Australian federal election: Port Adelaide
| Party | Candidate | Votes | % | ±% |
|---|---|---|---|---|
| Labor | Mark Butler | 46,024 | 50.58 | −3.98 |
| Liberal | Nigel McKenna | 23,955 | 26.32 | +3.32 |
| Greens | Dusan Popovic | 7,834 | 8.61 | −6.51 |
| Family First | Bruce Hambour | 6,843 | 7.52 | +0.29 |
| Palmer United | Ngoc Chau Huynh | 5,227 | 5.74 | +5.74 |
| Australia First | Terry Cooksley | 1,116 | 1.23 | +1.23 |
| Total formal votes | | 90,999 | 93.80 | +1.14 |
| Informal votes | | 6,020 | 6.20 | −1.14 |
| Turnout | | 97,019 | 92.17 | −1.16 |
Two-party-preferred result
| Labor | Mark Butler | 58,261 | 64.02 | −6.89 |
| Liberal | Nigel McKenna | 32,738 | 35.98 | +6.89 |
| Labor hold | | Swing | −6.89 | |

=== Sturt ===
2013 Australian federal election: Sturt
| Party | Candidate | Votes | % | ±% |
|---|---|---|---|---|
| Liberal | Christopher Pyne | 49,429 | 54.40 | +6.22 |
| Labor | Rick Sarre | 26,258 | 28.90 | −7.11 |
| Greens | Anne Walker | 8,902 | 9.80 | −0.28 |
| Family First | Kylie Barnes | 3,565 | 3.92 | +0.16 |
| Palmer United | Gabriella Scali | 2,713 | 2.99 | +2.99 |
| Total formal votes | | 90,867 | 95.48 | +0.79 |
| Informal votes | | 4,303 | 4.52 | −0.79 |
| Turnout | | 95,170 | 93.45 | −0.99 |
Two-party-preferred result
| Liberal | Christopher Pyne | 54,591 | 60.08 | +6.48 |
| Labor | Rick Sarre | 36,276 | 39.92 | −6.48 |
| Liberal hold | | Swing | +6.48 | |

=== Wakefield ===
2013 Australian federal election: Wakefield
| Party | Candidate | Votes | % | ±% |
|---|---|---|---|---|
| Labor | Nick Champion | 37,723 | 41.52 | −6.35 |
| Liberal | Tom Zorich | 34,425 | 37.89 | +5.12 |
| Family First | Paul Coombe | 5,436 | 5.98 | −0.70 |
| Greens | Sherree Clay | 4,683 | 5.15 | −6.18 |
| Palmer United | Dino Musolino | 3,890 | 4.28 | +4.28 |
| Independent | Mark Aldridge | 3,729 | 4.10 | +4.10 |
| Katter's Australian | Tony Musolino | 964 | 1.06 | +1.06 |
| Total formal votes | | 90,850 | 94.31 | +0.38 |
| Informal votes | | 5,479 | 5.69 | −0.38 |
| Turnout | | 96,329 | 93.11 | −0.33 |
Two-party-preferred result
| Labor | Nick Champion | 48,510 | 53.40 | −7.13 |
| Liberal | Tom Zorich | 42,340 | 46.60 | +7.13 |
| Labor hold | | Swing | −7.13 | |

== See also ==
- Results of the 2013 Australian federal election (House of Representatives)
- Post-election pendulum for the 2013 Australian federal election
- Members of the Australian House of Representatives, 2013–2016
