= Post-election pendulum for the 1984 Australian federal election =

The Mackerras pendulum as a way of predicting the outcome of an election contested between two major parties in a Westminster style lower house legislature such as the Australian House of Representatives, which is composed of single-member electorates and which uses a preferential voting system such as a Condorcet method or instant-runoff voting.

The pendulum works by lining up all of the seats held in Parliament for the government, the opposition and the crossbenches according to the percentage point margin they are held by on a two party preferred basis. This is also known as the swing required for the seat to change hands. Given a uniform swing to the opposition or government parties, the number of seats that change hands can be predicted.

Government seats (82)
Marginal
Chisholm	Vic	Helen Mayer	ALP	0.2
Rankin	Qld	David Beddall	ALP	0.6
Dunkley	Vic	Bob Chynoweth	ALP	1.1
Barton	NSW	Gary Punch	ALP	1.2
Ballarat	Vic	John Mildren	ALP	1.5
Eden-Monaro	NSW	Jim Snow	ALP	2.0
Bendigo	Vic	John Brumby	ALP	2.0
McEwen	Vic	Peter Cleeland	ALP	2.1
Lowe	NSW	Michael Maher	ALP	2.2
Hunter	NSW	Eric Fitzgibbon	ALP	2.4
Stirling	WA	Ron Edwards	ALP	2.5
Burke	Vic	Neil O'Keefe	ALP	2.9
Streeton	Vic	Tony Lamb	ALP	3.3
Hawker	SA	Ralph Jacobi	ALP	3.4
Herbert	Qld	Ted Lindsay	ALP	3.6
Canning	WA	George Gear	ALP	3.8
Cowan	WA	Carolyn Jakobsen	ALP	4.0
Phillip	NSW	Jeannette McHugh	ALP	4.2
Capricornia	Qld	Keith Wright	ALP	4.2
Brisbane	Qld	Manfred Cross	ALP	4.3
Isaacs	Vic	David Charles	ALP	4.4
Makin	SA	Peter Duncan	ALP	4.4
Moore	WA	Allen Blanchard	ALP	5.1
Bowman	Qld	Len Keogh	ALP	5.3
Leichhardt	Qld	John Gayler	ALP	5.5
Brand	WA	Wendy Fatin	ALP	5.5
Calare	NSW	David Simmons	ALP	5.6
Lilley	Qld	Elaine Darling	ALP	5.7
Kalgoorlie	WA	Graeme Campbell	ALP	6.0
Fairly safe
Jagajaga	Vic	Peter Staples	ALP	6.1
Perth	WA	Ric Charlesworth	ALP	6.3
Hindmarsh	SA	John Scott	ALP	6.4
Hughes	NSW	Robert Tickner	ALP	6.5
St George	NSW	Stephen Dubois	ALP	6.5
Aston	Vic	John Saunderson	ALP	6.5
Henty	Vic	Joan Child	ALP	6.7
Swan	WA	Kim Beazley	ALP	7.0
Grey	SA	Lloyd O'Neil	ALP	7.1
Kingston	SA	Gordon Bilney	ALP	7.4
McMillan	Vic	Barry Cunningham	ALP	8.0
Hotham	Vic	Lewis Kent	ALP	8.2
Robertson	NSW	Barry Cohen	ALP	8.6
La Trobe	Vic	Peter Milton	ALP	8.7
Dobell	NSW	Michael Lee	ALP	9.9
Adelaide	SA	Chris Hurford	ALP	10.0
Safe
Griffith	Qld	Ben Humphreys	ALP	10.3
Maribyrnong	Vic	Alan Griffiths	ALP	10.4
Banks	NSW	John Mountford	ALP	11.4
Lindsay	NSW	Ross Free	ALP	11.6
Canberra	ACT	Ros Kelly	ALP	11.6
Parramatta	NSW	John Brown	ALP	11.7
Throsby	NSW	Colin Hollis	ALP	11.7
Holt	Vic	Michael Duffy	ALP	12.2
Macarthur	NSW	Stephen Martin	ALP	12.3
Fraser	ACT	John Langmore	ALP	12.3
Corio	Vic	Gordon Scholes	ALP	12.4
Oxley	Qld	Bill Hayden	ALP	13.0
Fremantle	WA	John Dawkins	ALP	13.0
Shortland	NSW	Peter Morris	ALP	13.1
Greenway	NSW	Russ Gorman	ALP	13.8
Melbourne Ports	Vic	Clyde Holding	ALP	14.2
Newcastle	NSW	Allan Morris	ALP	14.5
Grayndler	NSW	Leo McLeay	ALP	14.9
Blaxland	NSW	Paul Keating	ALP	16.2
Werriwa	NSW	John Kerin	ALP	16.9
Charlton	NSW	Bob Brown	ALP	17.3
Reid	NSW	Tom Uren	ALP	17.3
Port Adelaide	SA	Mick Young	ALP	17.8
Bonython	SA	Neal Blewitt	ALP	18.9
Cunningham	NSW	Stewart West	ALP	19.1
Prospect	NSW	Dick Klugman	ALP	19.4
Chifley	NSW	Roger Price	ALP	19.5
Lalor	Vic	Barry Jones	ALP	20.0
Melbourne	Vic	Gerry Hand	ALP	20.0
Very safe
Fowler	NSW	Ted Grace	ALP	20.3
Wills	Vic	Bob Hawke	ALP	20.3
Kingsford Smith	NSW	Lionel Bowen	ALP	20.9
Calwell	Vic	Andrew Theophanous	ALP	22.2
Gellibrand	Vic	Ralph Willis	ALP	23.3
Sydney	NSW	Peter Baldwin	ALP	23.4
Batman	Vic	Brian Howe	ALP	24.7
Scullin	Vic	Harry Jenkins Sr.	ALP	27.6

Opposition seats (66)
Marginal
Forde	Qld	David Watson	LIB	0.02
Hinkler	Qld	Bryan Conquest	NAT	0.2
Casey	Vic	Bob Halverson	LIB	0.6
Petrie	Qld	John Hodges	LIB	0.6
Deakin	Vic	Julian Beale	LIB	0.7
Denison	Tas	Michael Hodgman	LIB	1.0
Gilmore	NSW	John Sharp	NAT	1.2
Flinders	Vic	Peter Reith	LIB	1.2
Lyons	Tas	Max Burr	LIB	1.3
Macquarie	NSW	Alasdair Webster	LIB	1.4
Northern Territory	NT	Paul Everingham	CLP	1.4
Bruce	Vic	Ken Aldred	LIB	2.1
Fisher	Qld	Peter Slipper	NAT	2.3
Forrest	WA	Peter Drummond	LIB	2.4
Moreton	Qld	Don Cameron	LIB	3.3
Corangamite	Vic	Stewart McArthur	LIB	3.4
Dawson	Qld	Ray Braithwaite	NAT	3.8
Cowper	NSW	Garry Nehl	NAT	4.1
Bass	Tas	Warwick Smith	LIB	4.4
New England	NSW	Ian Sinclair	NAT	4.6
Riverina-Darling	NSW	Noel Hicks	NAT	4.6
Braddon	Tas	Chris Miles	LIB	4.6
Fadden	Qld	David Jull	LIB	4.7
Page	NSW	Ian Robinson	NAT	5.1
Kennedy	Qld	Bob Katter Sr.	NAT	5.2
Cook	NSW	Don Dobie	LIB	5.4
Franklin	Tas	Bruce Goodluck	LIB	5.6
Menzies	Vic	Neil Brown	LIB	5.7
Sturt	SA	Ian Wilson	LIB	6.0
Fairly safe
Parkes	NSW	Michael Cobb	NAT	6.1
Goldstein	Vic	Ian Macphee	LIB	6.2
Wentworth	NSW	Peter Coleman	LIB	6.3
Lyne	NSW	Bruce Cowan	NAT	6.8
Richmond	NSW	Charles Blunt	NAT	7.2
Gwydir	NSW	Ralph Hunt	NAT	7.3
Hume	NSW	Wal Fife	LIB	7.7
Tangney	WA	Peter Shack	LIB	7.8
Bennelong	NSW	John Howard	LIB	8.5
Dundas	NSW	Philip Ruddock	LIB	8.9
Boothby	SA	Steele Hall	LIB	9.2
Curtin	WA	Allan Rocher	LIB	9.4
Moncrieff	Qld	Kathy Martin	LIB	9.9
Safe
Mackellar	NSW	Jim Carlton	LIB	10.1
Ryan	Qld	John Moore	LIB	10.4
Mayo	SA	Alexander Downer	LIB	10.5
Fairfax	Qld	Evan Adermann	NAT	10.6
Warringah	NSW	Michael MacKellar	LIB	10.7
North Sydney	NSW	John Spender	LIB	11.0
Wide Bay	Qld	Clarrie Millar	NAT	11.8
Higgins	Vic	Roger Shipton	LIB	12.1
Indi	Vic	Ewen Cameron	LIB	12.3
Barker	SA	James Porter	LIB	12.6
Wakefield	SA	Neil Andrew	LIB	12.9
Farrer	NSW	Tim Fischer	NAT	13.0
Kooyong	Vic	Andrew Peacock	LIB	13.0
McPherson	Qld	Peter White	LIB	13.5
Gippsland	Vic	Peter McGauran	NAT	14.3
Berowra	NSW	Harry Edwards	LIB	14.8
Wannon	Vic	David Hawker	LIB	15.4
Maranoa	Qld	Ian Cameron	NAT	15.5
Groom	Qld	Tom McVeigh	NAT	15.9
O'Connor	WA	Wilson Tuckey	LIB	19.2
Very safe
Mitchell	NSW	Alan Cadman	LIB	20.8
Mallee	Vic	Peter Fisher	NAT	21.4
Murray	Vic	Bruce Lloyd	NAT	23.1
Bradfield	NSW	David Connolly	LIB	25.5
