= 1984 Australian House of Representatives election =

1984 Australian federal election
- 1 December 1984

All 148 seats in the House of Representatives 75 seats were needed for a majority in the House 46 (of the 76) seats in the Senate
- Registered: 9,869,217 ▲5.30%
- Turnout: 9,295,421 (94.19%) (▼0.45 pp)
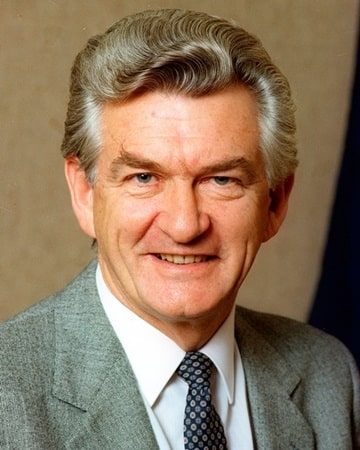

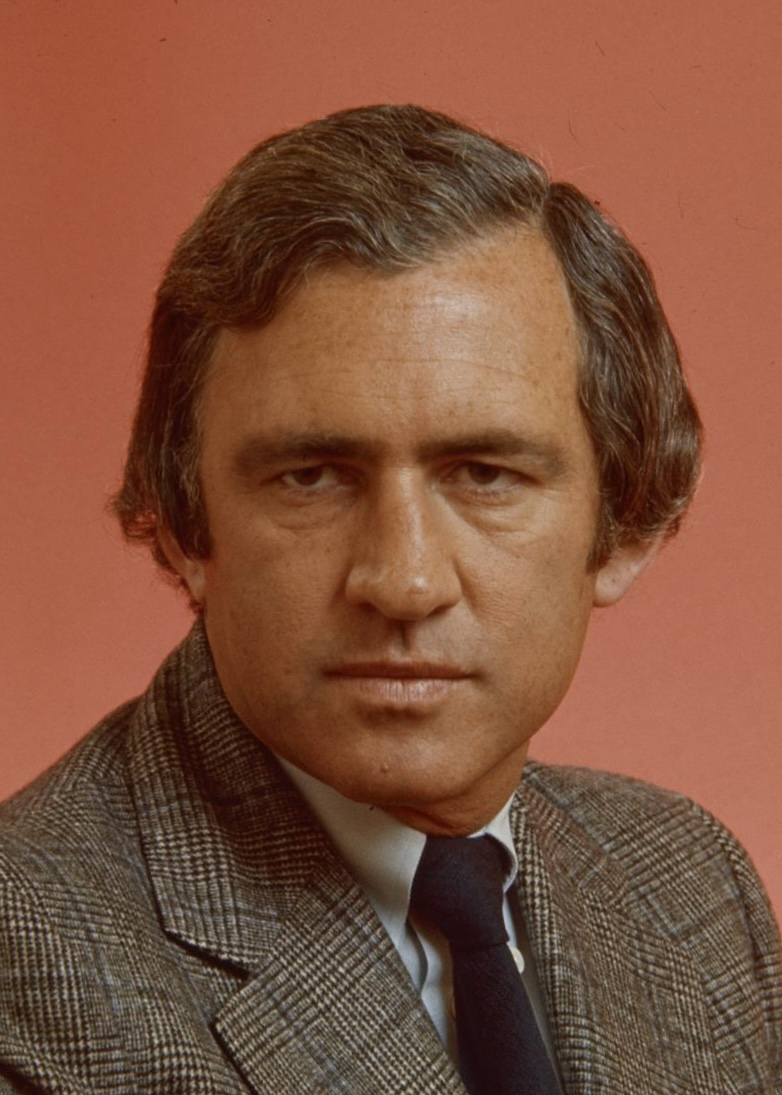
	First party	Second party
Leader	Bob Hawke	Andrew Peacock
Party	Labor	Liberal–National Coalition
Leader since	8 February 1983	11 March 1983
Leader's seat	Wills (Vic.)	Kooyong (Vic.)
Last election	75 seats	50 seats
Seats won	82 seats	66 seats
Seat change	▲7	▲16
Primary vote	4,120,130	3,900,042
Percentage	47.55%	45.01%
Swing	▼1.93%	▲1.40%
TPP	51.77%	48.23%
TPP swing	▼1.46%	▲1.46%
- Results by division for the House of Representatives, shaded by winning party's margin of victory.
Prime Minister before election
Bob Hawke
Labor
Subsequent Prime Minister
Bob Hawke
Labor

The following tables show results for the Australian House of Representatives at the 1984 federal election held on 1 December 1984.

== Australia ==
House of Reps (IRV) — 1984–87 – Turnout 94.19% (CV) — Informal 6.78%
Party	Votes	%	Swing	Seats	Change
Labor	4,120,130	47.55	−1.93	82	▲7
Liberal	2,951,556	34.06	−0.06	44	▲11
National	921,151	10.63	+1.42	21	▲4
Country Liberal	27,335	0.32	+0.08	1	▲1
Liberal–National Coalition	3,900,042	45.01	+1.40	66	▲16
Democrats	472,204	5.45	+0.42		
Democratic Labor	49,121	0.57	+0.37		
Nuclear Disarmament	17,978	0.21	+0.21		
Socialist Workers	9,460	0.11	–0.42		
Deadly Serious	2,826	0.03	–0.01		
Pensioner	1,645	0.02	+0.02		
Communist	1,213	0.01	–0.06		
Independents	90,333	1.04	+0.07		
Total	8,664,952			148	▲23
Two-party-preferred
Labor	4,484,622	51.77	−1.46	82	▲7
Liberal–National Coalition	4,178,572	48.23	+1.46	66	▲16
Invalid/blank votes	630,469	6.8	+4.7		
Turnout	9,295,421	94.2			
Registered voters	9,869,217				
Source: Federal Election Results 1949-1993

== States ==
=== New South Wales ===
1984 Australian federal election (New South Wales)
- 1 December 1984

All 51 New South Wales seats in the Australian House of Representatives and 7 seats in the Australian Senate
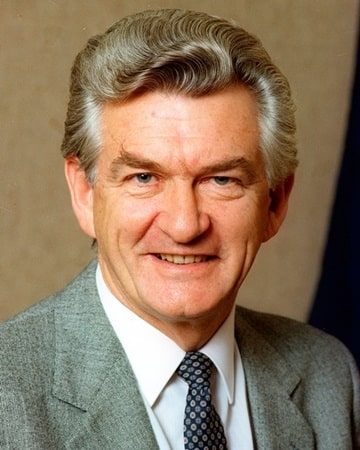

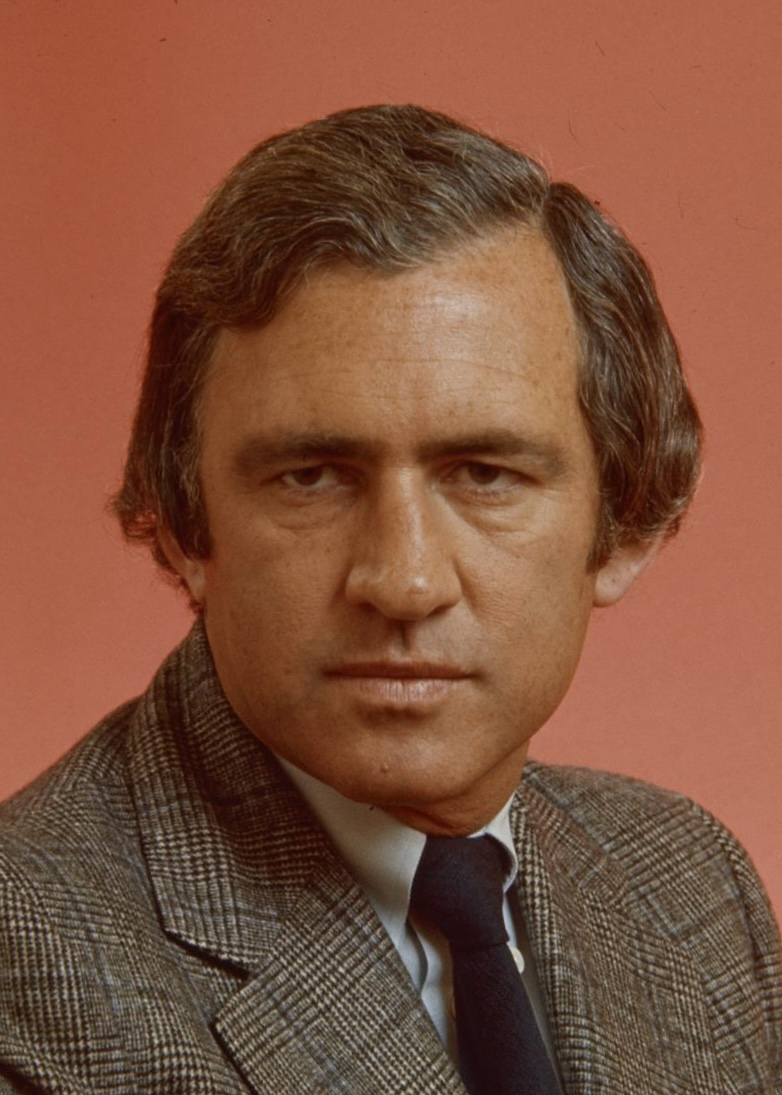
	First party	Second party
Leader	Bob Hawke	Andrew Peacock
Party	Labor	Liberal/National coalition
Last election	24 seats	19 seats
Seats won	29 seats	22 seats
Seat change	▲5	▲3
Popular vote	1,458,856	1,308,922
Percentage	48.3%	43.3%
Swing	▼1.8	▲0.7
TPP	52.91%	47.09%
TPP swing	▲1.38	▼1.38

Turnout 94.1% (CV) — Informal 6.2%
Party	Votes	%	Swing	Seats	Change
Liberal	990,464	32.76	+1.21	12	▲1
National	318,458	10.53	–0.43	10	▲2
Liberal/National Coalition	1,308,922	43.30	+0.79	22	▲3
Labor	1,458,856	48.26	–1.86	29	▲5
Democrats	178,806	5.91	+1.12		
Independent	65,606	2.17	+1.12		
Nuclear Disarmament	5,438	0.18	+0.18		
Socialist Workers	4,261	0.14	–0.55		
Communist	1,213	0.04	–0.14		
Total	3,023,102			51	▲8
Two-party-preferred vote
Labor	1,599,219	52.91	+1.38		▲5
Liberal/National Coalition	1,423,408	47.09	–1.38		▲3
Invalid/blank votes	198,648	6.2	+4.0		
Turnout	3,221,750	94.1			
Registered voters	3,424,032				
Source: Federal Election Results 1949-1993

=== Victoria ===
1984 Australian federal election (Victoria)
- 1 December 1984

All 39 Victorian seats in the Australian House of Representatives and 7 seats in the Australian Senate
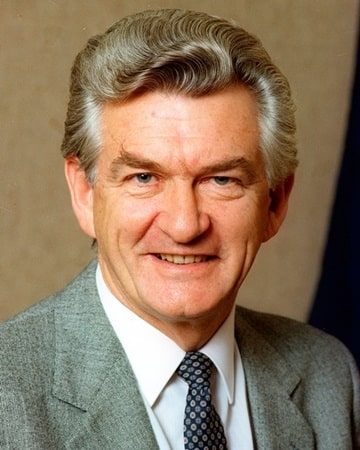

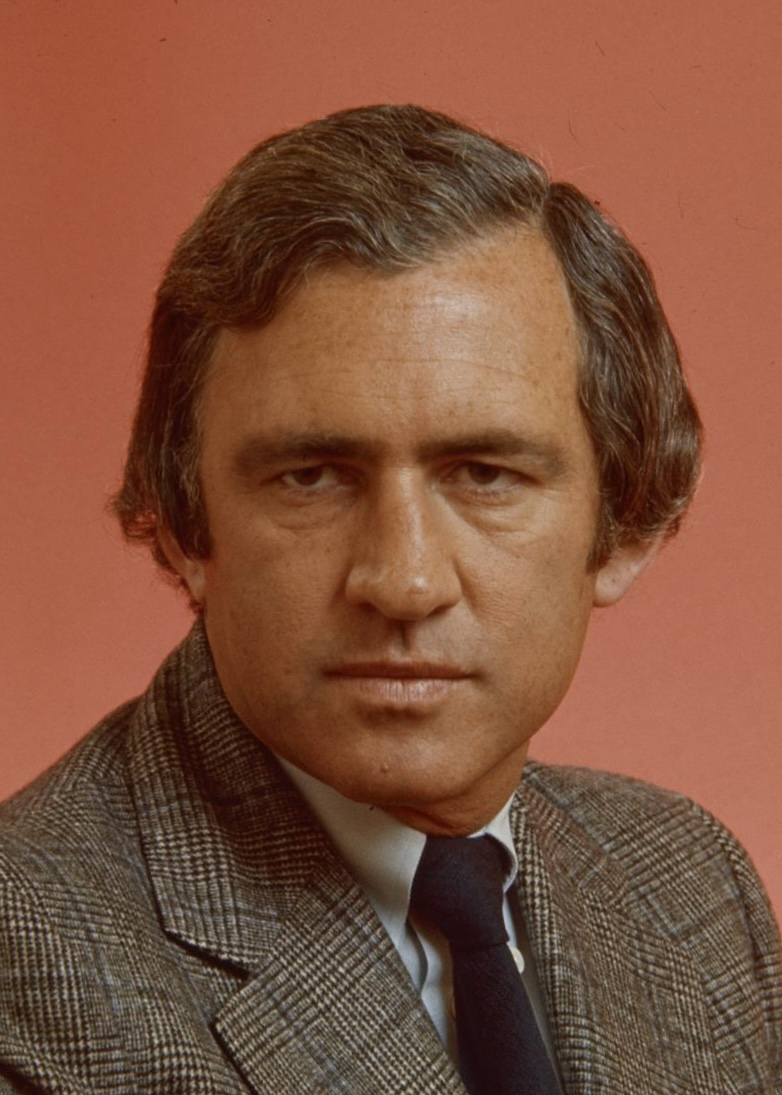
	First party	Second party
Leader	Bob Hawke	Andrew Peacock
Party	Labor	Liberal/National coalition
Last election	23 seats	10 seats
Seats won	25 seats	14 seats
Seat change	▲2	▲4
Popular vote	1,117,874	987,858
Percentage	48.9%	43.3%
Swing	▼1.6	▲1.3
TPP	54.09%	46.91%
TPP swing	▲4.85	▼4.85

Turnout 95.1% (CV) — Informal 8.2%
Party	Votes	%	Swing	Seats	Change
Liberal	842,423	36.88	–0.20	11	▲4
National	145,435	6.37	1.50	3	Steady
Liberal/National Coalition	987,858	43.24	1.30	14	▲4
Labor	1,117,873	48.93	–1.60	25	▲2
Democrats	115,172	5.04	–0.70		
Democratic Labor	49,121	2.15			
Independent	8,925	0.39			
Nuclear Disarmament	2,702	0.12			
Pensioner	1,645	0.07			
Socialist Workers	1,236	0.05			
Total	2,284,532			39	▲6
Two-party-preferred vote
Labor	1,212,308	53.09	+4.85		▲2
Liberal/National Coalition	1,071,270	46.91	–4.85		▲4
Invalid/blank votes	202,740	8.2	+5.9		
Turnout	2,487,273	95.1			
Registered voters	2,614,383				
Source: Federal Election Results 1949-1993

=== Queensland ===
1984 Australian federal election (Queensland)
- 1 December 1984

All 24 Queensland seats in the Australian House of Representatives and 7 seats in the Australian Senate
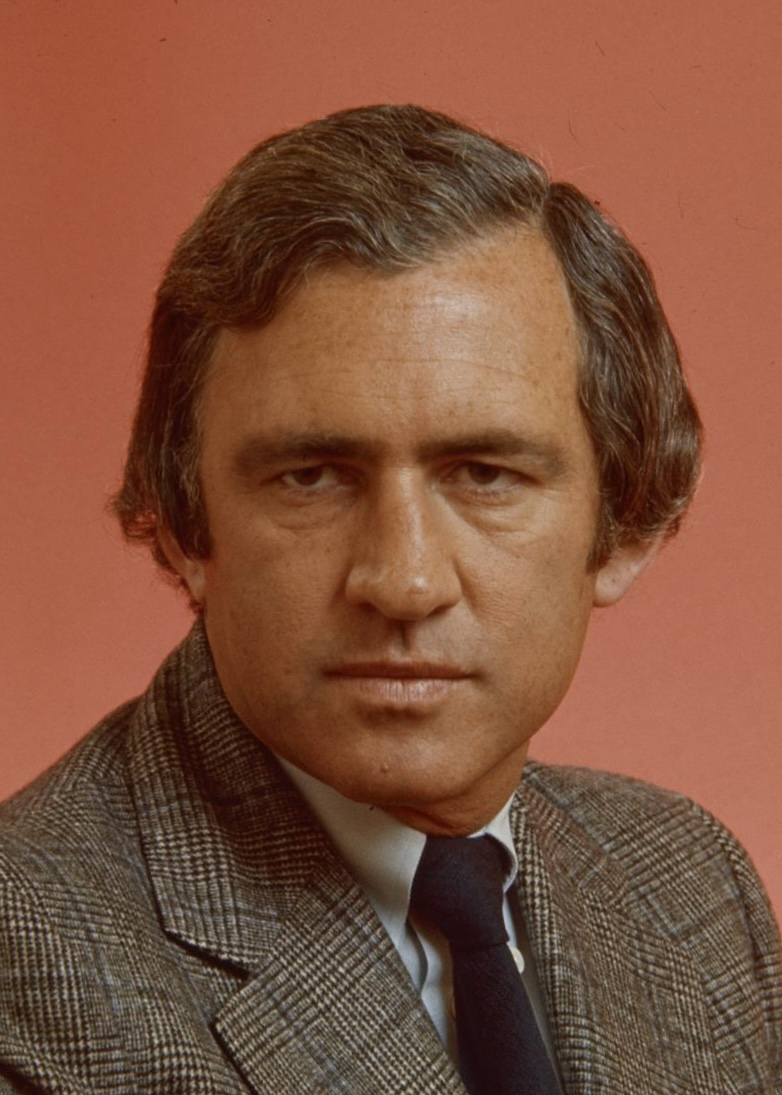

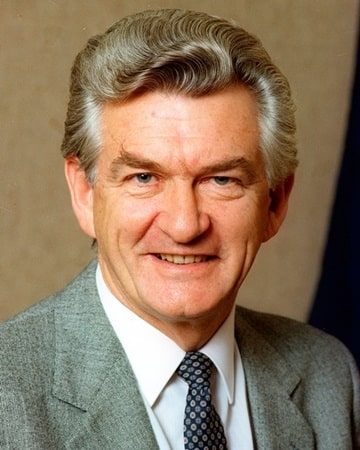
	First party	Second party
Leader	Andrew Peacock	Bob Hawke
Party	Liberal/National coalition	Labor
Last election	9	10 seats
Seats won	15 seats	9 seats
Seat change	▲6	▼1
Popular vote	699,350	605,804
Percentage	50.9%	44.1%
Swing	▲3.2	▲1.3
TPP	52.29%	47.71
TPP swing	▼2.26	▲2.26

Turnout 95.1% (CV) — Informal 8.2%
Party	Votes	%	Swing	Seats	Change
National	435,832	31.70	+7.95	8	▲2
Liberal	263,518	19.16	–5.24	7	▲4
Liberal/National Coalition	699,350	50.86	2.72	15	▲6
Labor	605,813	44.06	–2.08	9	▼1
Democrats	66,243	4.82	+0.17		
Independent	3,043	0.22	–0.13		
Socialist Workers	592	0.04	–0.22		
Total	1,375,040			24	▲5
Two-party-preferred vote
Liberal/National Coalition	718,873	52.29	–2.26	15	▲6
Labor	656,029	47.71	+2.26	9	▼1
Invalid/blank votes	65,803	4.6	+1.3		
Turnout	1,440,843	92.7			
Registered voters	1,555,600				
Source: Federal Election Results 1949-1993

=== Western Australia ===
1984 Australian federal election (Western Australia)
- 1 December 1984

All 13 Western Australian seats in the Australian House of Representatives and 7 seats in the Australian Senate
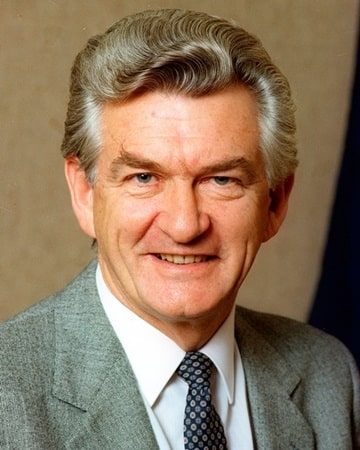

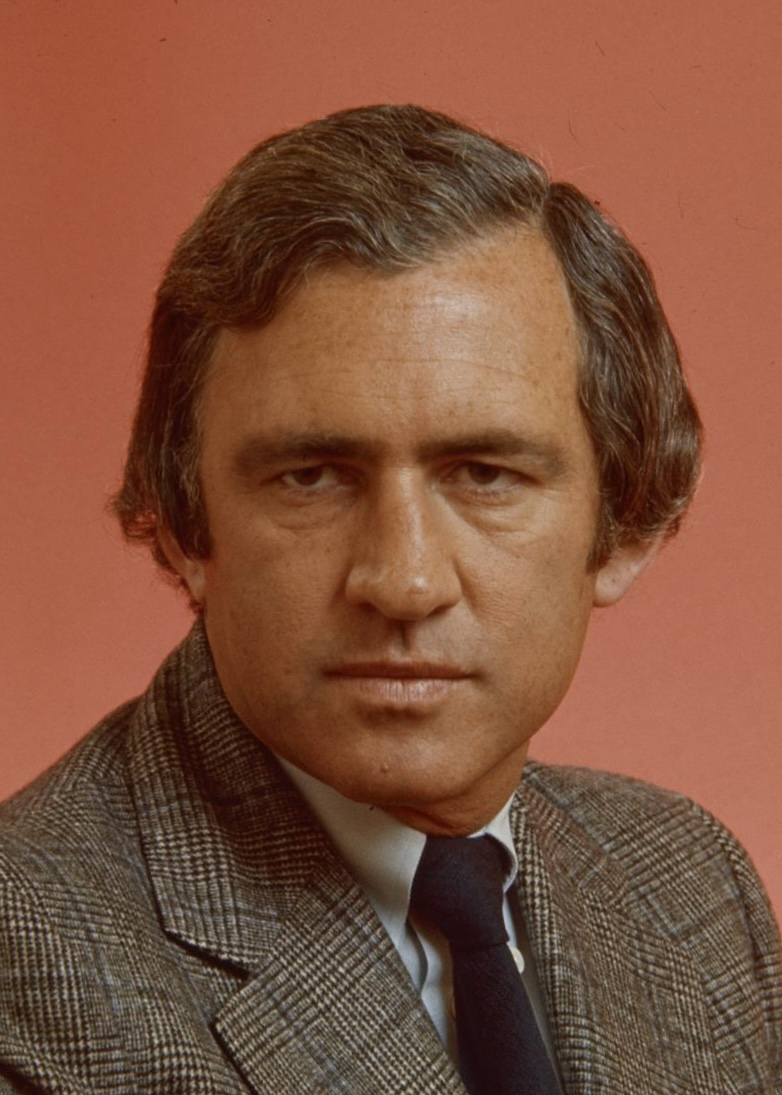
	First party	Second party
Leader	Bob Hawke	Andrew Peacock
Party	Labor	Liberal/National coalition
Last election	8 seats	3 seats
Seats won	9 seats	4 seats
Seat change	▲1	▲1
Popular vote	359,810	351,317
Percentage	48.2%	47.1%
Swing	▼3.8	▲3.9
TPP	50.9%	49.1%
TPP swing	▼0.6	▲0.6

Turnout 95.1% (CV) — Informal 8.2%
Party	Votes	%	Swing	Seats	Change
Liberal	341,500	45.74	3.92	4	▲1
National	9,817	1.31	-0.02		Steady
Liberal/National Coalition	351,317	47.05	3.90	4	▲1
Labor	359,810	48.19	-3.76	9	▲1
Democrats	27,598	3.70	-0.32		
Independents	3,791	0.51	0.06		
Nuclear Disarmament	2,623	0.35			
Socialist Workers	1,535	0.21	-0.09		
Total	746,674			13	▲2
Two-party-preferred vote
Labor	379,731	50.86	2.27	9	▲1
Liberal/National Coalition	366,912	49.14	-2.27	4	▲1
Invalid/blank votes	59,801	7.42	5.44		
Turnout	806,475	93.82			
Registered voters	859,623				
Source: Federal Election Results 1949-1993

=== South Australia ===
1984 Australian federal election (South Australia)
- 1 December 1984

All 13 South Australian seats in the Australian House of Representatives and 7 seats in the Australian Senate
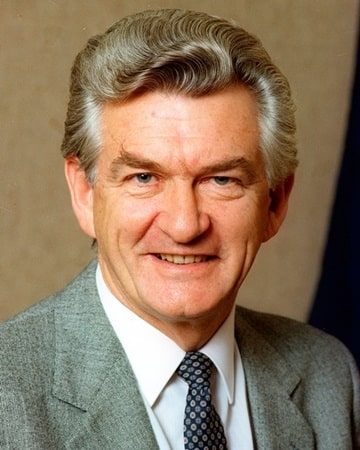

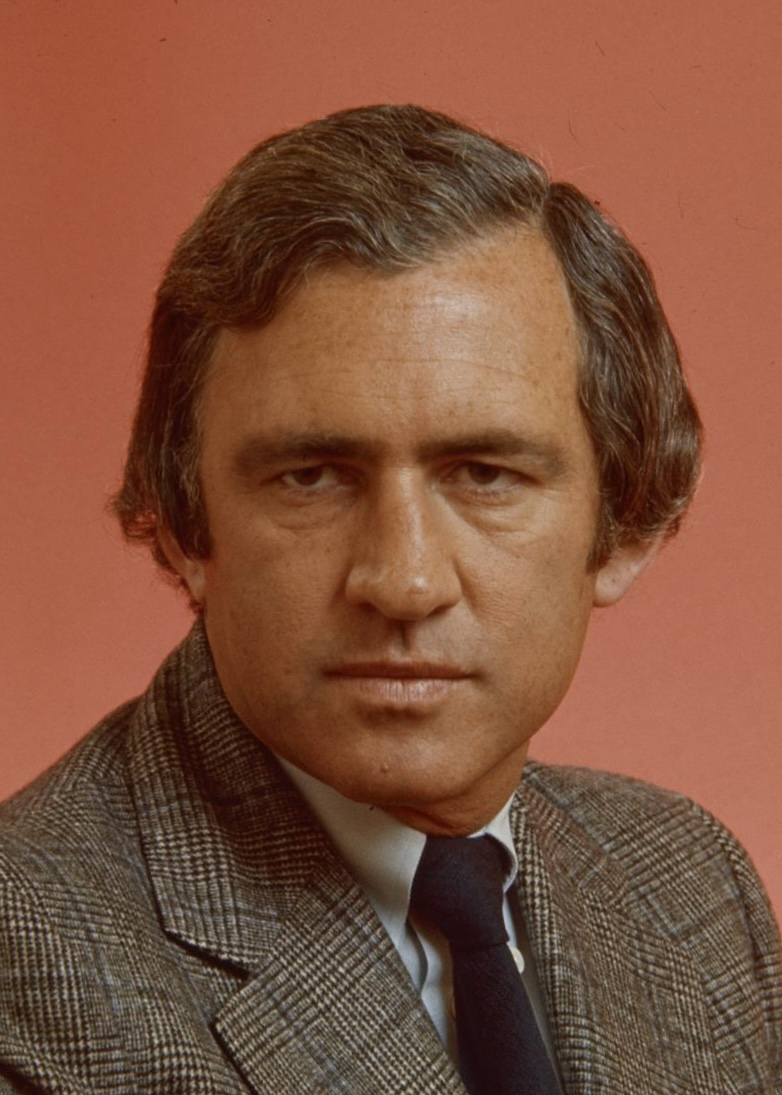
	First party	Second party
Leader	Bob Hawke	Andrew Peacock
Party	Labor	Liberal/National coalition
Last election	7 seats	4 seats
Seats won	8 seats	5 seats
Seat change	▲1	▲1
Popular vote	367,915	348,862
Percentage	6.87%	47.1%
Swing	▼1.5	▲2.35
TPP	51.7%	48.3
TPP swing	▼0.6	▲0.6

Turnout 94.9% (CV) — Informal 8.7%
Party	Votes	%	Swing	Seats	Change
Liberal	337,253	42.97	0.87	5	▲1
National	11,609	1.48	1.48		Steady
Liberal/National Coalition	348,862	44.45	2.35	5	▲1
Labor	367,915	46.87	-1.51	8	▲1
Democrats	61,822	7.88	0.94		
Nuclear Disarmament	2,270	0.29			
Independent	2,205	0.28	-0.14		
Socialist Workers	1,836	0.23	-0.65		
Total	784,910			13	▲2
Two-party-preferred vote
Labor	405,496	51.67	-0.63	8	▲1
Liberal/National Coalition	379,305	48.33	0.63	5	▲1
Invalid/blank votes	74,719	8.69	6.02		
Turnout	859,629	94.85			
Registered voters	906,278				
Source: Federal Election Results 1949-1993

=== Tasmania ===
1984 Australian federal election (Tasmania)
- 1 December 1984

All 5 Tasmanian seats in the Australian House of Representatives and 7 seats in the Australian Senate
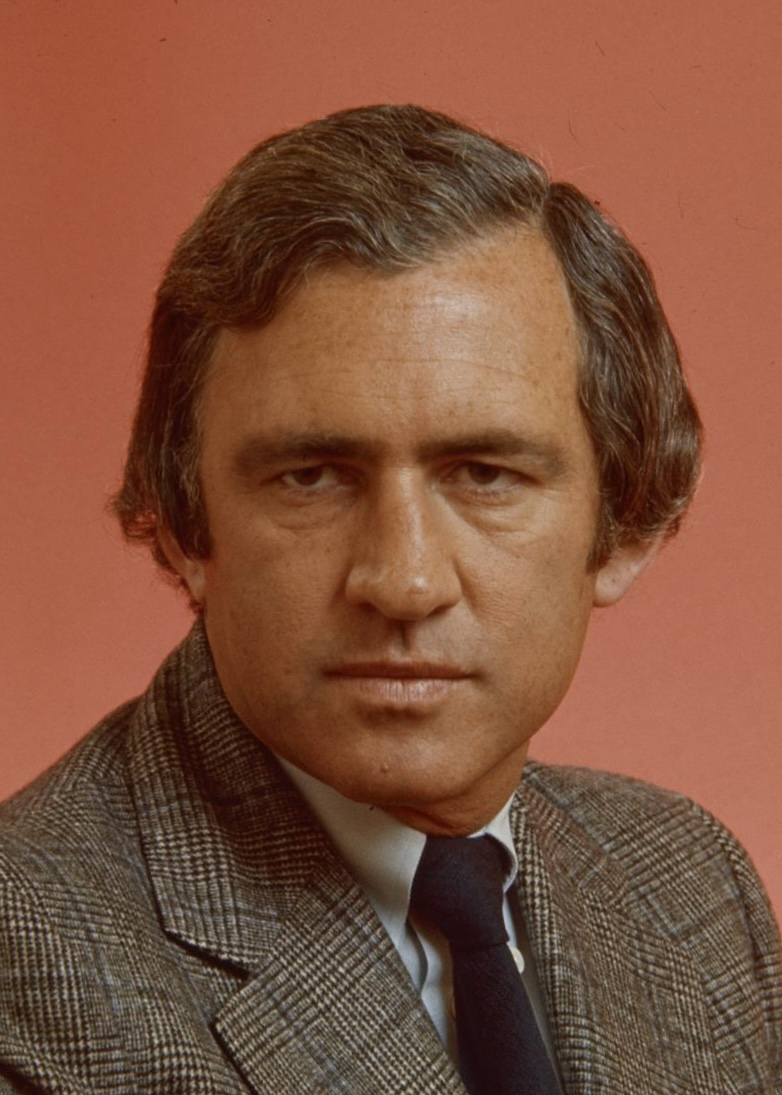

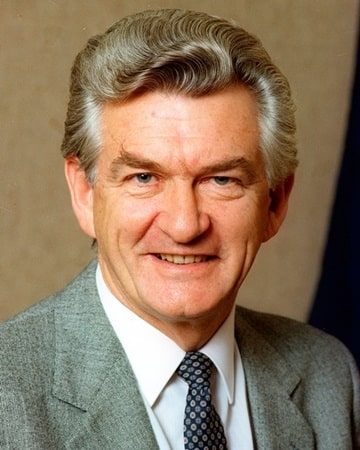
	First party	Second party
Leader	Andrew Peacock	Bob Hawke
Party	Liberal/National coalition	Labor
Last election	5 seats	0 seats
Seats won	5 seats	0 seats
Seat change	Steady	Steady
Popular vote	133,173	113,094
Percentage	51.1%	43.4%
Swing	▼3.8	▲3.1
TPP	53.4%	46.6%
TPP swing	▼3.1	▲3.1

Turnout 95.1% (CV) — Informal 8.2%
Party	Votes	%	Swing	Seats	Change
Liberal	133,173	51.13	-3.78	5	Steady
Labor	113,094	43.42	3.14		Steady
Democrats	10,432	4.01	0.44		
Independent	3,747	1.44	0.46		
Total	260,446			5	
Two-party-preferred vote
Liberal	138,983	53.37	-3.05	5	Steady
Labor	121,438	46.63	3.05	0	Steady
Invalid/blank votes	16,237	5.87	3.57		
Turnout	276,683	95.40			
Registered voters	290,028				
Source: Federal Election Results 1949-1993

== Territories ==
=== Australian Capital Territory ===
1984 Australian federal election (Australian Capital Territory)
- 5 March 1984

Both Australian Capital Territory seats in the Australian House of Representatives and both seats in the Australian Senate
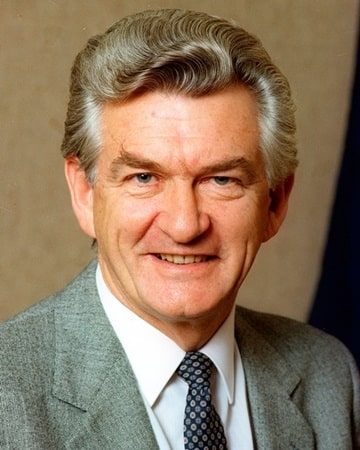

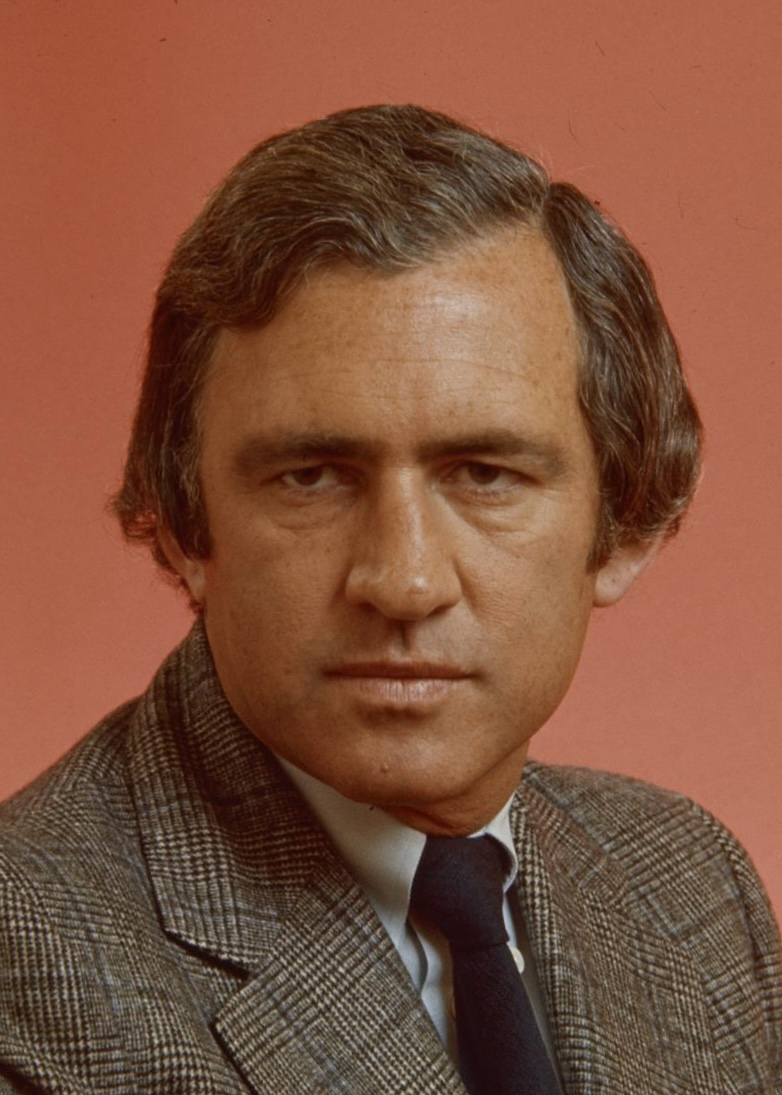
	First party	Second party
Leader	Bob Hawke	Andrew Peacock
Party	Labor	Coalition
Last election	2 seats	0 seats
Seats won	2	0
Seat change	Steady	Steady
Popular vote	71,637	43,225
Percentage	53.34%	32.19%
Swing	▼10.56	▲0.15
TPP	61.96%	38.04%
TPP swing	▼3.53	▲3.53

Turnout 94.1% (CV) — Informal 2.9%
Party	Votes	%	Swing	Seats	Change
Labor	71,637	53.34	-10.56	2	Steady
Liberal	43,225	32.19	+0.15	0	Steady
Democrats	10,225	7.61			
Nuclear Disarmament	4,945	3.68			
Deadly Serious	2,826	2.10	-0.86		
Independents	1,435	1.07	-0.03		
Total	134,293			2	
Two-party-preferred vote
Labor	83,207	61.96	-3.53	2	Steady
Liberal	51,074	38.04	3.53	0	Steady
Invalid/blank votes	7,204	5.09	2.88		
Turnout	141,497	94.07			
Registered voters	150,416				
Source: Federal Election Results 1949-1993

=== Northern Territory ===
1984 Australian federal election (Northern Territory)
- 5 March 1984

The one Northern Territory seat in the Australian House of Representatives and both seats in the Australian Senate
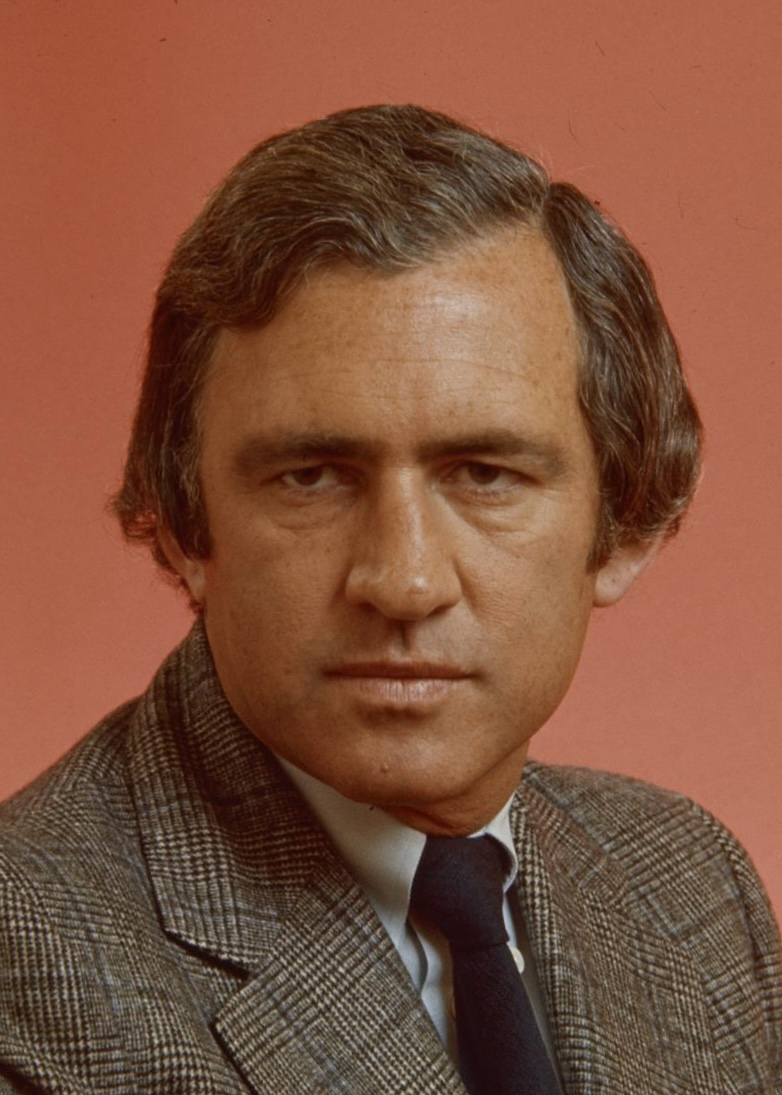

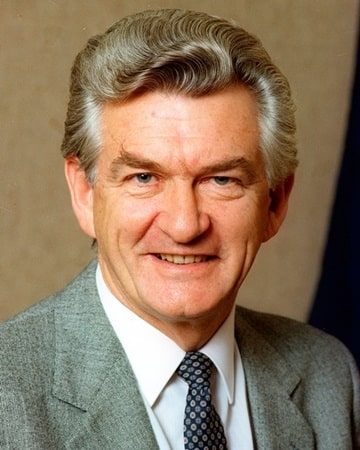
	First party	Second party
Leader	Andrew Peacock	Bob Hawke
Party	Coalition	Labor
Last election	0 seats	1 seat
Seats won	1	0
Seat change	▲1	▼1
Popular vote	27,335	25,140
Percentage	48.8%	44.9%
Swing	▲2.0	▼1.7
TPP	51.4%	48.6%
TPP swing	▲3.3	▼3.3

1984 Australian federal election: Northern Territory
Party	Candidate	Votes	%	±%
Country Liberal	Paul Everingham	27,335	48.8	+2.0
Labor	John Reeves	25,140	44.9	−1.7
Democrats	Wiyendji Roberts	1,906	3.4	−0.1
Independent	Phil Ward	1,191	2.1	+2.1
Independent	Strider	390	0.7	+0.1
Total formal votes		55,962	95.1	
Informal votes		2,909	4.9	
Turnout		58,871	85.5	
Two-party-preferred result
Country Liberal	Paul Everingham	28,747	51.4	+3.3
Labor	John Reeves	27,194	48.6	−3.3
Country Liberal gain from Labor		Swing	+3.3	

== See also ==
- Post-election pendulum for the 1984 Australian federal election
- Results of the 1984 Australian federal election (Senate)
- Members of the Australian House of Representatives, 1984–1987
