= Elizabeth Harvey (politician) =

Australian politician (1946–2025)

Member of the Australian Parliament for Hawker
- In office 11 July 1987 – 24 March 1990
- Preceded by: Ralph Jacobi
- Succeeded by: Chris Gallus

Personal details
- Born: 19 October 1946 Adelaide, South Australia
- Died: 24 May 2025 (aged 78)
- Party: Australian Labor Party
- Spouse: Peter

Elizabeth Robyn Truman née Harvey (19 October 1946 – 24 May 2025) was an Australian politician. She served as an Australian Labor Party member of the Australian House of Representatives from 1987 to 1990.

Harvey was born in Adelaide on 19 October 1946. She completed a diploma in secondary teaching at Adelaide Teachers College and a Bachelor of Arts at the University of Adelaide. She worked as a language teacher at Elizabeth High School, and taught English as a Second Language at Gilles Street Primary School.

Harvey won the south Adelaide seat of Hawker as the Labor candidate at the 1987 federal election. Harvey was defeated for the same seat by Liberal candidate Chris Gallus at the 1990 federal election by an extremely narrow 14 votes.

After politics, Truman worked as a ministerial staffer, public servant, teacher and writer. She published on a blog her novel, Snowflake's Hope, a fictionalised account of her experiences as a Federal MP.

Truman died on 24 May 2025.

Parliament of Australia
Preceded by Ralph Jacobi	Member for Hawker; 1987–1990	Succeeded by Chris Gallus
