= Steve Georganas =

Australian politician (born 1959)

Steve Georganas MP
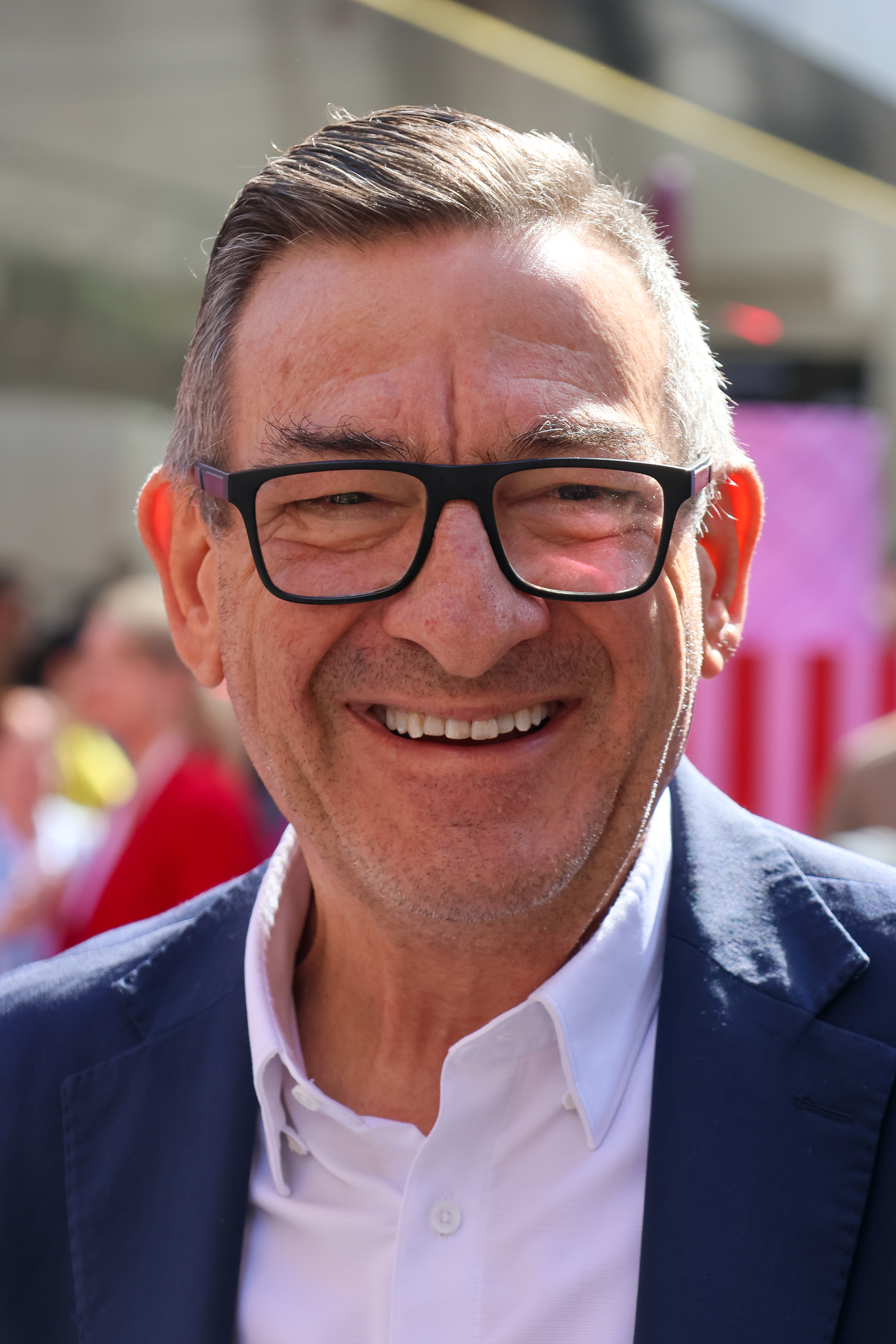
- Georganas in 2026

Member of the Australian Parliament for Adelaide
- Incumbent
- Assumed office 18 May 2019
- Preceded by: Kate Ellis

Member of the Australian Parliament for Hindmarsh
- In office 2 July 2016 – 18 May 2019
- Preceded by: Matt Williams
- Succeeded by: Mark Butler
- In office 9 October 2004 – 7 September 2013
- Preceded by: Chris Gallus
- Succeeded by: Matt Williams

Personal details
- Born: 13 June 1959 (age 67) Adelaide, South Australia, Australia
- Party: Australian Labor Party
- Children: 2
- Occupation: Taxi driver, underwriter, policy advisor
- Website: facebook.com/steve.georganas/

Steven Georganas (Greek: Στηβ Γεωργανάς; born 13 June 1959) is an Australian politician and is the Australian Labor Party member for the House of Representatives seat of Adelaide in South Australia since the 2019 Australian federal election. Previously, he had been the member for Hindmarsh from 2004 to 2013 and again from 2016 to 2019.

== Background ==
Georganas was born in Adelaide of Greek parents. He gained a Business Studies Certificate at a TAFE college and worked as a taxi driver, an assembly-line worker in a factory, and an underwriter. He worked as a ministerial adviser to South Australian government minister Jay Weatherill from 2002 to 2004.

== Political career ==
=== Elections ===
Georganas was the Labor Party candidate for Hindmarsh at the 1998 federal election and the 2001 federal election, but was unsuccessful on both occasions, losing to the incumbent Liberal Party MP Chris Gallus.

When Gallus retired at the 2004 federal election, Georganas defeated new Liberal candidate Simon Birmingham, winning Hindmarsh by 108 votes. He was re-elected with increased majorities at the 2007 and 2010 federal elections.

Georganas was defeated by Liberal candidate Matt Williams at the 2013 federal election when the Australian Labor Party lost government. Georganas was successful at recapturing the seat for Labor at the 2016 federal election.

A redistribution ahead of the 2019 federal election saw the neighbouring seat of Port Adelaide abolished, with most of its territory being transferred to Hindmarsh. The redistribution made Hindmarsh significantly more secure for Labor, boosting the Labor majority to 8.2 percent. Soon afterward, the Left and Right factions of SA Labor reached a deal that saw Georganas relinquish Hindmarsh to the incumbent MP for Port Adelaide, former federal Labor president Mark Butler. In return, Georganas was given Labor preselection for Adelaide, after the incumbent MP, Kate Ellis, announced that she was retiring. Adelaide was made safer for Labor at the redistribution, having a nominal majority of 9 percent.

=== Policy positions ===
Georganas campaigned on noise reduction surrounding the Adelaide Airport, and in 2007 introduced a private member's bill to create an Aircraft Noise Ombudsman.

He is a prominent advocate for animal welfare and curtailing live animal exports, speaking at rallies and tabling motions in parliament calling for the practice to be condemned and fines to be imposed for animal cruelty. He also campaigned for the super-trawler FV Margiris to be banned from fishing in Australia.

Georganas voted in support of same-sex marriage in Australia when the issue was debated in parliament in 2013.

He has also campaigned for a "Do Not Knock" register to ban door-to-door salespeople from visiting registered properties, and introduced a private member's bill to create a register in 2012.

Georganas left Labor Left, the faction that had supported him since the 1990s, in May 2019. Georganas joined several other South Australian MPs, candidates and members who had resigned from the left to join Labor Unity, including Tony Piccolo MP in 2013 and candidate Jo Chapley in 2018.

== Personal life ==
Georganas has lived in the suburb of Mile End, currently in the electorate of Adelaide, his entire life. He has two adult sons.

He is a supporter of the West Adelaide Football Club, and was a member of the club's board of directors from 2013 to 2016. He is also involved in numerous community organizations, including as president of his local Lions club, and as a board member of the Adelaide Greek Glendi Festival.

Parliament of Australia
Preceded by Chris Gallus	Member for Hindmarsh; 2004–2013	Succeeded by Matt Williams
Preceded by Matt Williams	Member for Hindmarsh; 2016–2019	Succeeded by Mark Butler
Preceded by Kate Ellis	Member for Adelaide; 2019–present	Incumbent
