= Matt Williams (Australian politician) =

Australian politician (born 1973)

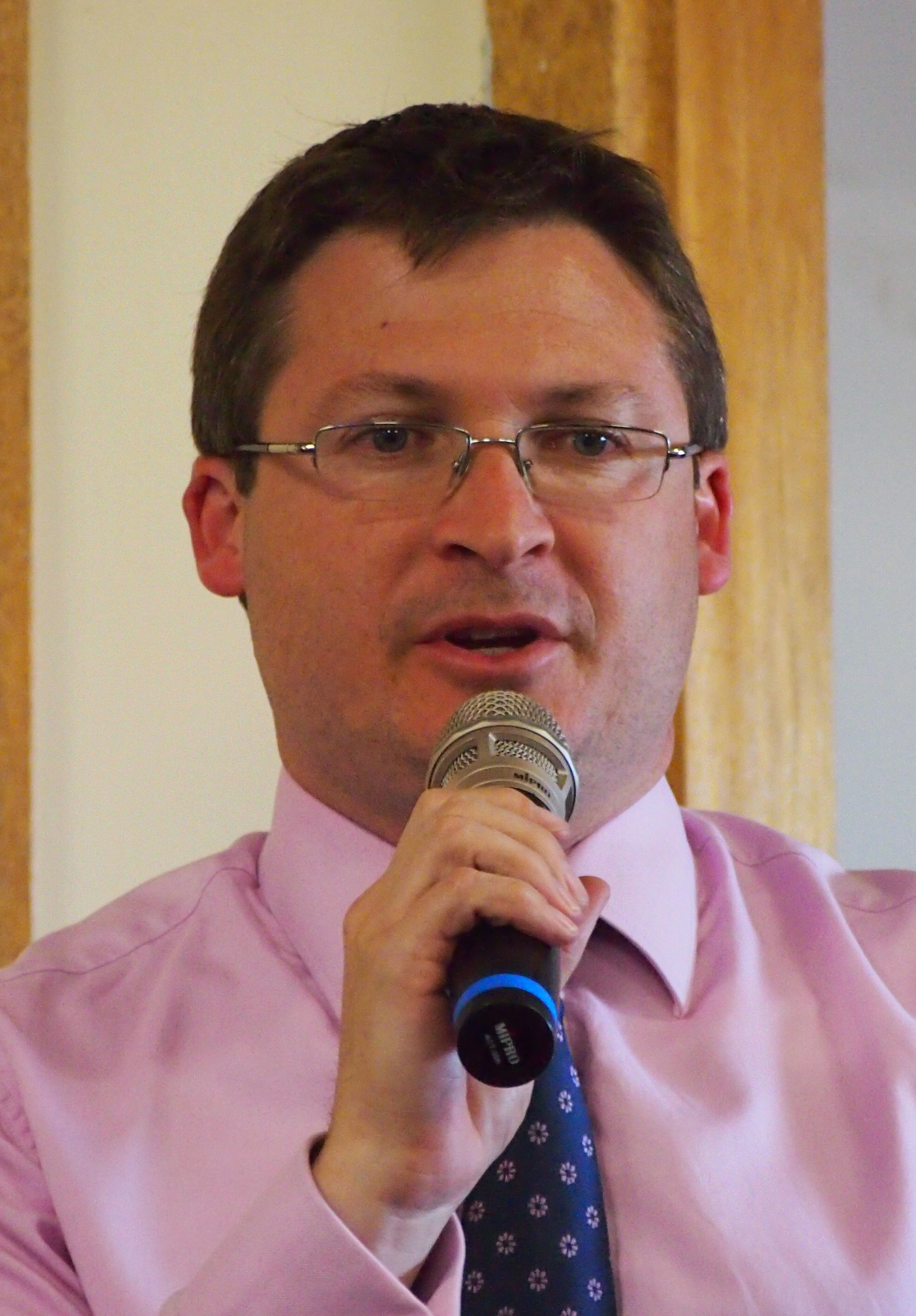

Member of the Australian Parliament for Hindmarsh
- In office 7 September 2013 – 2 July 2016
- Preceded by: Steve Georganas
- Succeeded by: Steve Georganas

Personal details
- Born: 28 April 1973 (age 53) Adelaide, South Australia, Australia
- Party: Liberal Party of Australia
- Spouse: Leanne Brooks
- Children: 2
- Occupation: Business consultant

Matthew Williams (born 28 April 1973) is a former Australian politician who was a Liberal member of the House of Representatives seat of Hindmarsh in South Australia from the 2013 election until the 2016 election.

== Background ==
Williams was born in Adelaide and educated at Immanuel College, before graduating with degrees in economics from Flinders University and law from the University of Adelaide. After working for the South Australian Government from 1998 to 2000 and the state Agent-General in London from 2000 to 2002, he held a variety of roles in high-profile law and accounting firms.

== Parliament ==
Williams entered federal parliament at the 2013 election where he won the seat of Hindmarsh with a 1.89 percent margin from a 7.97 percent two-party-preferred swing, defeating Australian Labor Party incumbent Steve Georganas. The only South Australian seat to change hands in 2013, Hindmarsh became the most marginal seat in South Australia and the only marginal seat of the incoming federal government in South Australia.

During the 2013 election campaign Williams committed to opposing any changes to the existing evening aircraft flight curfew at Adelaide Airport, centrally located in the Hindmarsh electorate. However, in December 2013 the Abbott government changed the curfew to allow Cathay Pacific international passenger flights to land outside the established curfew times.

In 2015 it was reported that Liberal insiders were considering Williams to be the preselected Liberal candidate for the state seat of Morphett if he failed to retain Hindmarsh at the 2016 federal election. When the preselection contest took place in April 2017, there was a dead-heat between Williams and Stephen Patterson, followed by a random ballot won by Patterson, who went on to successfully challenge the incumbent Liberal member, Duncan McFetridge.

Parliament of Australia
Preceded by Steve Georganas	Member for Hindmarsh; 2013–2016	Succeeded by Steve Georganas
