= Chris Gallus =

Australian politician (born 1943)

The Honourable Christine Gallus

Member of the Australian Parliament for Hawker
- In office 24 March 1990 – 13 March 1993
- Preceded by: Elizabeth Harvey
- Succeeded by: Division abolished

Member of the Australian Parliament for Hindmarsh
- In office 13 March 1993 – 31 August 2004
- Preceded by: John Scott
- Succeeded by: Steve Georganas

Personal details
- Born: 6 April 1943 (age 83) Adelaide, South Australia
- Party: Liberal Party of Australia
- Education: Flinders University; Australian National University
- Occupation: Journalist, business director

Christine Ann Gallus (born 6 April 1943) is an Australian former politician. She served as a Liberal member of the Australian House of Representatives from 1990 to 2004, representing two different seats in South Australia—the Division of Hawker from 1990 to 1993 and the Division of Hindmarsh from 1993 to 2004. She was born in Adelaide and was educated at the Firbank Girls' Grammar School in Melbourne, Flinders University and the Australian National University. She was a researcher with the South Australian Health Commission, an advertising executive, journalist and small business director before entering politics.

Gallus was first elected to the seat of Hawker, based on Glenelg and the Holdfast Bay area, at the 1990 election, defeating one-term Labor incumbent Elizabeth Harvey on a razor-edge 50.01 percent two-party vote from a 1.2 percent two-party swing. Had at least 8 of 14 Australian Democrats supporters ranked Harvey higher than Gallus on next preferences, Harvey would have won.

Hawker was abolished ahead of the 1993 federal election. Most of its territory, including Glenelg, was absorbed into neighbouring Hindmarsh, and Gallus opted to follow most of her constituents there. Hindmarsh had long been a Labor stronghold, but had grown increasingly marginal over the last decade. Largely due to the addition of Holdfast Bay, Labor's already thin majority of 5.3 percent was pared back even further, to an extremely marginal 1.2 percent. Additionally, the election was called at a bad time for the state Labor government, which was still reeling from the collapse of the State Bank of South Australia. Indeed, the state Labor government would be heavily defeated at a state election later that year. Gallus took a substantial first-count lead and ultimately won on the eighth count, becoming only the second non-Labor MP ever to win the seat and the first since 1917. To date, it is also the only time that Labor has been in government without holding Hindmarsh.

In the last couple of years of the Liberal Party's time in Opposition, which ended in 1996, Gallus was Shadow Minister for Aboriginal Affairs, in which she was seen as an effective opponent against Aboriginal Affairs Minister Robert Tickner when she attacked his credibility over the Hindmarsh Island bridge controversy. On one occasion, she moved a censure motion against Tickner during question time, with Prime Minister Paul Keating humorously referring to her as "Callous Gallus". The controversy over the Hindmarsh Island bridge was believed to have cost Tickner his seat at the 1996 election. Despite this she was not picked for a place in the ministry by new Liberal Prime Minister John Howard.

Gallus did, however, become Parliamentary Secretary to the Minister for Reconciliation and Aboriginal and Torres Strait Islander Affairs in 2001 and Parliamentary Secretary to the Minister for Foreign Affairs 2001–04.

Gallus gained a large swing in the 1996 election, technically making Hindmarsh a safe Liberal seat. However, she had to withstand strong challenges from Labor's Steve Georganas in the next two elections. Gallus retired at the 2004 election and was replaced as the Liberal candidate by Simon Birmingham, who lost the seat to Georganas by just 108 votes.

Parliament of Australia
Preceded by Elizabeth Harvey	Member for Hawker; 1990–1993	Division abolished
Preceded by John Scott	Member for Hindmarsh; 1993–2004	Succeeded by Steve Georganas
