= John Scott (South Australian politician) =

Australian politician

Member of the Australian Parliament for Hindmarsh
- In office 18 October 1980 – 8 February 1993
- Preceded by: Clyde Cameron
- Succeeded by: Chris Gallus

Personal details
- Born: 31 March 1934 (age 92) Hamilton, Scotland
- Party: Australian Labor Party
- Occupation: Trade unionist

John Lyden Scott (born 31 March 1934) is an Australian politician. He was an Australian Labor Party member of the Australian House of Representatives from 1980 to 1993.

Scott was born in Hamilton, Scotland. He served in the Royal Air Force from 1955 to 1958. After emigrating to Australia, he became active in the trade union movement, serving as a member of the Amalgamated Metal Workers and Shipwrights Union council from 1969 to 1980.

In the 1980 federal election, Scott was elected in the Adelaide seat of Hindmarsh. He was subsequently re-elected to the same seat at the 1983, 1984, 1987, and 1990 elections.

Parliament of Australia
Preceded by Clyde Cameron	Member for Hindmarsh; 1980–1993	Succeeded by Chris Gallus
