= Division of Hawker =

Former Australian federal electoral division

Coordinates: 34°58′55″S 138°30′58″E

Hawker Australian House of Representatives Division
- Created: 1969
- Abolished: 1993
- Namesake: Charles Hawker

The Division of Hawker was an Australian Electoral Division in South Australia. The division was created in 1969 and abolished in 1993. It was named for Charles Hawker, who was a federal MP 1929–38. It was located in the southern suburbs of Adelaide and took in the suburbs of Ascot Park, Clovelly Park, Edwardstown, Glenelg, Goodwood and Morphettville. Hawker was located between the seats of Hindmarsh and Kingston.

Originally created as a marginal Liberal seat prior to the 1969 election on a notional 5.8 percent two-party margin, the seat was won by Labor's Ralph Jacobi on a 7.9 percent two-party margin from a 13.7 percent two-party swing.

Jacobi was elected during the height of the popularity of the SA state Labor government under Don Dunstan, and held the seat until his retirement at the 1987 election. However, his margins were successively reduced from the late 1970s onward. He survived two redistributions in the Liberals' favour–prior to the 1977 election from a marginal Labor seat to a notional marginal Liberal seat and again prior to the 1984 election from a fairly safe Labor seat to a notional marginal Labor seat.

Jacobi handed the seat to Labor's Elizabeth Harvey, who held the seat for one term before being defeated by Liberal Chris Gallus at the 1990 election on a razor-edge 0.01 percent two-party margin from a 1.2 percent two-party swing, a victory of just 14 votes. Had at least 8 of 14 Australian Democrats supporters ranked Harvey second on their ballots rather than Gallus, Harvey would have been re-elected.

The seat was abolished prior to the 1993 election, with its territory being split between nearby Boothby and Hindmarsh. The Liberal hold on Boothby was reduced from a safe 10.7 two-party margin to a marginal notional 4.5 percent two-party margin while the Labor hold on Hindmarsh was reduced from a marginal 5.3 percent two-party vote to a marginal notional one percent two-party vote. Most of the seat's territory was absorbed by Labor-held Hindmarsh, and Gallus opted to transfer there rather than challenge fellow Liberal Steele Hall for Liberal preselection in Liberal-held Boothby. Gallus was successful for Liberal preselection in Hindmarsh and went on to narrowly win the seat.

== Members ==
Image	Member	Party	Term	Notes
	Ralph Jacobi (1928–2002)	Labor	25 October 1969 – 5 June 1987	Retired
	Elizabeth Harvey (1946–2025)	Labor	11 July 1987 – 24 March 1990	Lost seat
	Chris Gallus (1943–)	Liberal	24 March 1990 – 13 March 1993	Transferred to the Division of Hindmarsh after Hawker was abolished in 1993
