= Ralph Jacobi =

Australian politician

Ralph Jacobi AM
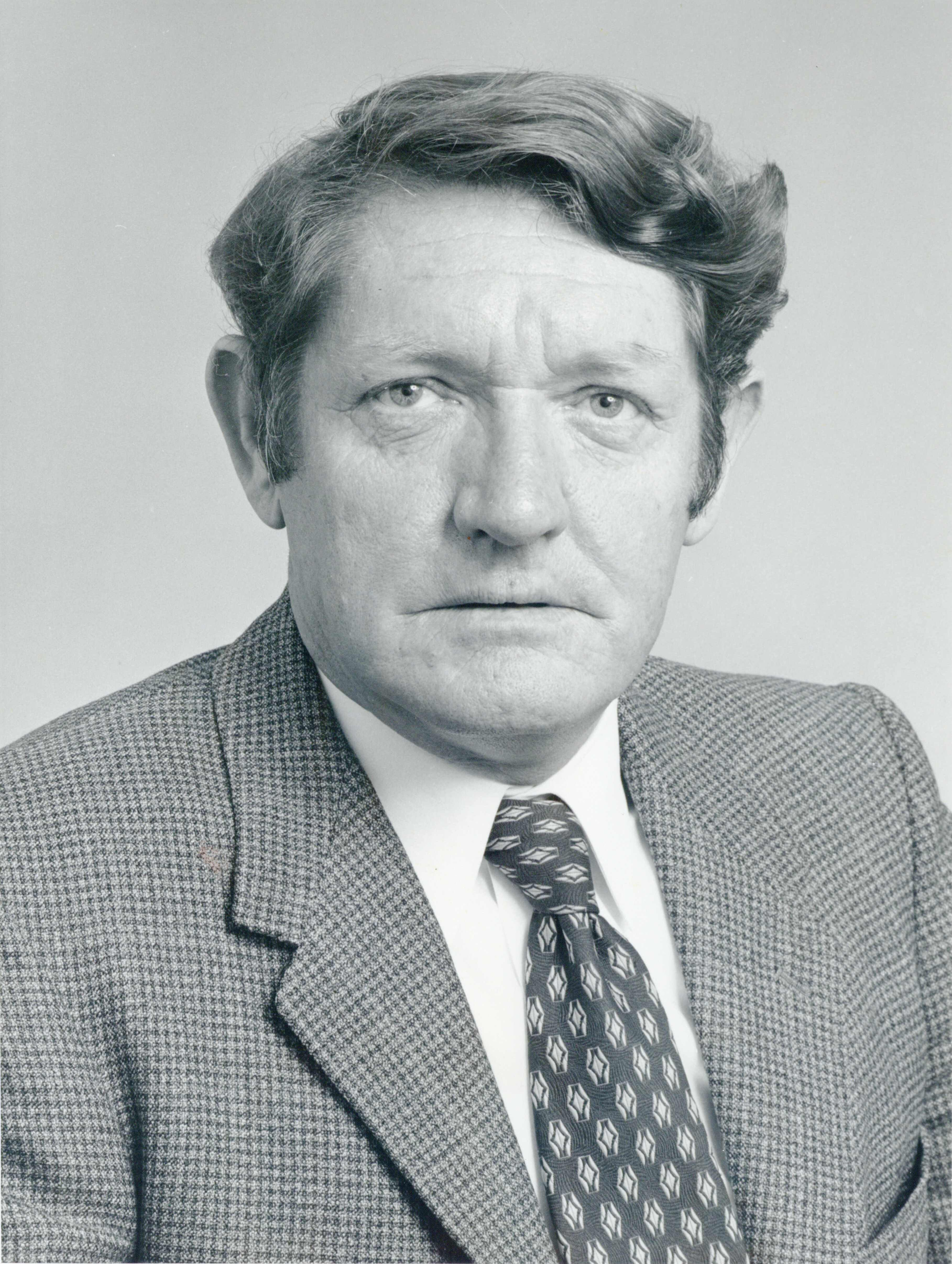

Member of the Australian Parliament for Hawker
- In office 25 October 1969 – 5 June 1987
- Preceded by: New seat
- Succeeded by: Elizabeth Harvey

Personal details
- Born: 4 December 1928 Keswick, South Australia
- Died: 16 January 2002 (aged 73) Adelaide, South Australia
- Party: Australian Labor Party
- Occupation: Naval officer

Ralph Jacobi AM (4 December 1928 – 16 January 2002) was an Australian politician. He was an Australian Labor Party member of the Australian House of Representatives from 1969 until 1987.

Before parliament, Jacobi was employed in the merchant navy and was executive officer of the South Australian Trades and Labour Council and secretary of the Australian Government Workers Association. In parliament, he was a member of the Foreign Affairs and Defence and Trade Committee, the Library Committee and the Privileges Committee. He refused to be in a party faction, which reportedly cost him the chairmanship of the foreign affairs and trade committee in 1984. Although a backbencher, he made significant policy contributions in the areas of reforming corporations law and the regulation of the insurance industry.

In 1987, as knowledge of Jacobi's condition of lymphatic cancer became known, nearly all members of the House of Representatives signed a petition for his appointment of the Order of Australia; it was included in the Queen's Birthday Honours, 1987. After leaving politics, he was chair of the Advisory Council of the National Archives of Australia from 1988 to 1991.

Ralph Jacobi died in 2002, aged 73.

Parliament of Australia
Preceded by Electorate created	Member for Hawker; 1969–1987	Succeeded by Elizabeth Harvey
