= Electoral results for the Division of Port Adelaide =

Australian division election results

This is a list of electoral results for the Division of Port Adelaide in Australian federal elections from the division's creation in 1949 until its abolition in 2019.

== Members ==
| Member | Party | Term |
|---|---|---|
| Albert Thompson | Labor | 1949–1963 |
| Fred Birrell | Labor | 1963–1974 |
| Mick Young | Labor | 1974–1988 |
| Rod Sawford | Labor | 1988–2007 |
| Mark Butler | Labor | 2007–2019 |

== Election results ==
=== Elections in the 2010s ===
==== 2016 ====
2016 Australian federal election: Port Adelaide
| Party | Candidate | Votes | % | ±% |
|---|---|---|---|---|
| Labor | Mark Butler | 46,314 | 48.24 | −2.34 |
| Xenophon | Michael Slattery | 17,970 | 18.72 | +18.72 |
| Liberal | Emma Flowerdew | 17,884 | 18.63 | −7.69 |
| Greens | Matthew Carey | 6,683 | 6.96 | −1.65 |
| Family First | Bruce Hambour | 4,483 | 4.67 | −2.85 |
| Animal Justice | Janine Clipstone | 2,078 | 2.16 | +2.16 |
| Christian Democrats | Jenalie Salt | 597 | 0.62 | +0.62 |
| Total formal votes | | 96,009 | 94.19 | +0.39 |
| Informal votes | | 5,927 | 5.81 | −0.39 |
| Turnout | | 101,936 | 89.93 | −2.24 |
Notional two-party-preferred count
| Labor | Mark Butler | 67,119 | 69.91 | +5.89 |
| Liberal | Emma Flowerdew | 28,890 | 30.09 | −5.89 |
Two-candidate-preferred result
| Labor | Mark Butler | 62,274 | 64.86 | +0.84 |
| Xenophon | Michael Slattery | 33,735 | 35.14 | +35.14 |
| Labor hold | | Swing | N/A | |

==== 2013 ====
2013 Australian federal election: Port Adelaide
| Party | Candidate | Votes | % | ±% |
|---|---|---|---|---|
| Labor | Mark Butler | 46,024 | 50.58 | −3.98 |
| Liberal | Nigel McKenna | 23,955 | 26.32 | +3.32 |
| Greens | Dusan Popovic | 7,834 | 8.61 | −6.51 |
| Family First | Bruce Hambour | 6,843 | 7.52 | +0.29 |
| Palmer United | Ngoc Chau Huynh | 5,227 | 5.74 | +5.74 |
| Australia First | Terry Cooksley | 1,116 | 1.23 | +1.23 |
| Total formal votes | | 90,999 | 93.80 | +1.14 |
| Informal votes | | 6,020 | 6.20 | −1.14 |
| Turnout | | 97,019 | 92.17 | −1.16 |
Two-party-preferred result
| Labor | Mark Butler | 58,261 | 64.02 | −6.89 |
| Liberal | Nigel McKenna | 32,738 | 35.98 | +6.89 |
| Labor hold | | Swing | −6.89 | |

==== 2010 ====
2010 Australian federal election: Port Adelaide
| Party | Candidate | Votes | % | ±% |
|---|---|---|---|---|
| Labor | Mark Butler | 48,638 | 53.82 | −4.42 |
| Liberal | Nigel McKenna | 21,615 | 23.92 | −1.29 |
| Greens | Kalyna Micenko | 13,659 | 15.11 | +6.35 |
| Family First | Bruce Hambour | 6,467 | 7.16 | +1.38 |
| Total formal votes | | 90,379 | 92.82 | −2.22 |
| Informal votes | | 6,991 | 7.18 | +2.22 |
| Turnout | | 97,370 | 93.35 | −1.52 |
Two-party-preferred result
| Labor | Mark Butler | 63,295 | 70.03 | +0.28 |
| Liberal | Nigel McKenna | 27,084 | 29.97 | −0.28 |
| Labor hold | | Swing | +0.28 | |

=== Elections in the 2000s ===
==== 2007 ====
2007 Australian federal election: Port Adelaide
| Party | Candidate | Votes | % | ±% |
|---|---|---|---|---|
| Labor | Mark Butler | 52,732 | 58.24 | +3.73 |
| Liberal | Brenton Chomel | 22,830 | 25.21 | −6.71 |
| Greens | Colin Thomas | 7,935 | 8.76 | +3.34 |
| Family First | Bruce Hambour | 5,230 | 5.78 | +1.01 |
| Democrats | Pam Moore | 1,822 | 2.01 | +0.01 |
| Total formal votes | | 90,549 | 95.04 | +2.12 |
| Informal votes | | 4,724 | 4.96 | −2.12 |
| Turnout | | 95,273 | 95.04 | +0.70 |
Two-party-preferred result
| Labor | Mark Butler | 63,158 | 69.75 | +6.84 |
| Liberal | Brenton Chomel | 27,391 | 30.25 | −6.84 |
| Labor hold | | Swing | +6.84 | |

==== 2004 ====
2004 Australian federal election: Port Adelaide
| Party | Candidate | Votes | % | ±% |
|---|---|---|---|---|
| Labor | Rod Sawford | 46,692 | 54.51 | +2.47 |
| Liberal | Terry Inglis | 27,338 | 31.92 | +5.21 |
| Greens | Anne McMenamin | 4,641 | 5.42 | +1.56 |
| Family First | Richard Bunting | 4,085 | 4.77 | +4.77 |
| Democrats | Trevor Tucker | 1,710 | 2.00 | −7.97 |
| One Nation | Stan Batten | 1,191 | 1.39 | −4.17 |
| Total formal votes | | 85,657 | 92.92 | +0.33 |
| Informal votes | | 6,522 | 7.08 | −0.33 |
| Turnout | | 82,179 | 94.34 | −0.73 |
Two-party-preferred result
| Labor | Rod Sawford | 53,888 | 62.91 | −3.09 |
| Liberal | Terry Inglis | 31,769 | 37.09 | +3.09 |
| Labor hold | | Swing | −3.09 | |

==== 2001 ====
2001 Australian federal election: Port Adelaide
| Party | Candidate | Votes | % | ±% |
|---|---|---|---|---|
| Labor | Rod Sawford | 38,783 | 50.77 | −2.33 |
| Liberal | Josh Krieg | 22,474 | 29.42 | +3.61 |
| Democrats | Matilda Bawden | 7,313 | 9.57 | +0.62 |
| One Nation | Andrew Phillips | 3,932 | 5.15 | −3.83 |
| Greens | Brian Noone | 3,210 | 4.20 | +4.08 |
| Communist | Michael Perth | 672 | 0.88 | −0.16 |
| Total formal votes | | 76,384 | 93.14 | −1.25 |
| Informal votes | | 5,627 | 6.86 | +1.25 |
| Turnout | | 82,011 | 95.48 | |
Two-party-preferred result
| Labor | Rod Sawford | 49,379 | 64.65 | −1.07 |
| Liberal | Josh Krieg | 27,005 | 35.35 | +1.07 |
| Labor hold | | Swing | −1.07 | |

=== Elections in the 1990s ===
==== 1998 ====
1998 Australian federal election: Port Adelaide
| Party | Candidate | Votes | % | ±% |
|---|---|---|---|---|
| Labor | Rod Sawford | 39,449 | 53.10 | +4.68 |
| Liberal | Romeo Cavuoto | 19,083 | 25.69 | −11.12 |
| One Nation | John Powell | 6,731 | 9.06 | +9.06 |
| Democrats | Matilda Bawden | 6,696 | 9.01 | −0.55 |
| Independent | Rick Hill | 1,527 | 2.06 | +2.06 |
| Communist | Michael Perth | 801 | 1.08 | +1.08 |
| Total formal votes | | 74,287 | 94.46 | +0.02 |
| Informal votes | | 4,358 | 5.54 | −0.02 |
| Turnout | | 78,645 | 95.62 | −0.01 |
Two-party-preferred result
| Labor | Rod Sawford | 49,107 | 66.10 | +9.06 |
| Liberal | Romeo Cavuoto | 25,180 | 33.90 | −9.06 |
| Labor hold | | Swing | +9.06 | |

==== 1996 ====
1996 Australian federal election: Port Adelaide
| Party | Candidate | Votes | % | ±% |
|---|---|---|---|---|
| Labor | Rod Sawford | 35,939 | 48.43 | −5.04 |
| Liberal | Rick Hill | 27,315 | 36.81 | +3.81 |
| Democrats | Maddalena Rositano | 7,096 | 9.56 | +2.78 |
| Greens | George Apap | 3,387 | 4.56 | +4.56 |
| Natural Law | Enid Mohylenko | 475 | 0.64 | −0.44 |
| Total formal votes | | 74,212 | 94.44 | −0.30 |
| Informal votes | | 4,372 | 5.56 | +0.30 |
| Turnout | | 78,584 | 95.63 | +1.27 |
Two-party-preferred result
| Labor | Rod Sawford | 42,153 | 57.05 | −5.00 |
| Liberal | Rick Hill | 31,736 | 42.95 | +5.00 |
| Labor hold | | Swing | −5.00 | |

==== 1993 ====
1993 Australian federal election: Port Adelaide
| Party | Candidate | Votes | % | ±% |
|---|---|---|---|---|
| Labor | Rod Sawford | 41,248 | 53.47 | +1.11 |
| Liberal | Alan McCarthy | 25,437 | 33.00 | +0.66 |
| Democrats | Don Knott | 5,235 | 6.79 | −5.29 |
| Independent | Colin Shearing | 2,473 | 3.21 | +3.21 |
| Grey Power | Emily Gilbey-Riley | 1,182 | 1.53 | +1.09 |
| Natural Law | Andrew Hobbs | 830 | 1.08 | +1.08 |
| Independent | Bert Joy | 719 | 0.93 | +0.93 |
| Total formal votes | | 77,144 | 94.73 | −0.55 |
| Informal votes | | 4,288 | 5.27 | +0.55 |
| Turnout | | 81,432 | 94.36 | |
Two-party-preferred result
| Labor | Rod Sawford | 47,811 | 62.05 | −0.35 |
| Liberal | Alan McCarthy | 29,246 | 37.95 | +0.35 |
| Labor hold | | Swing | −0.35 | |

==== 1990 ====
1990 Australian federal election: Port Adelaide
| Party | Candidate | Votes | % | ±% |
|---|---|---|---|---|
| Labor | Rod Sawford | 36,186 | 53.5 | −7.8 |
| Liberal | Howard Trotter | 21,539 | 31.9 | +3.3 |
| Democrats | Damien Aidon | 8,003 | 11.8 | +5.7 |
| Call to Australia | Peter Thompson | 1,013 | 1.5 | +1.5 |
| Democratic Socialist | Paul Petit | 859 | 1.3 | +1.3 |
| Total formal votes | | 67,600 | 95.4 | |
| Informal votes | | 3,275 | 4.6 | |
| Turnout | | 70,875 | 96.0 | |
Two-party-preferred result
| Labor | Rod Sawford | 42,718 | 63.3 | −3.0 |
| Liberal | Howard Trotter | 24,780 | 36.7 | +3.0 |
| Labor hold | | Swing | −3.0 | |

=== Elections in the 1980s ===
1988 Port Adelaide by-election
| Party | Candidate | Votes | % | ±% |
|---|---|---|---|---|
| Labor | Rod Sawford | 29,773 | 47.1 | −14.2 |
| Liberal | Judy Fuller | 23,818 | 37.7 | +9.1 |
| Democrats | Meg Lees | 4,506 | 7.1 | +1.0 |
| Independent | Tony Chaplin | 2,385 | 3.8 | +3.8 |
| Independent | Ruby Hammond | 1,142 | 1.8 | +1.8 |
| Independent | Jocelyn Aver | 743 | 1.2 | +1.2 |
| Independent | Michael Brander | 438 | 0.7 | +0.7 |
| Independent | Bruce Deering | 412 | 0.7 | +0.7 |
| Total formal votes | | 63,217 | 95.7 | |
| Informal votes | | 2,865 | 4.3 | |
| Turnout | | 66,082 | 91.1 | |
Two-party-preferred result
| Labor | Rod Sawford | 34,885 | 55.2 | −11.1 |
| Liberal | Judy Fuller | 28,276 | 44.8 | +11.1 |
| Labor hold | | Swing | −11.1 | |

==== 1987 ====
1987 Australian federal election: Port Adelaide
| Party | Candidate | Votes | % | ±% |
|---|---|---|---|---|
| Labor | Mick Young | 38,196 | 61.3 | −0.9 |
| Liberal | Barry Blundell | 17,780 | 28.6 | +0.0 |
| Democrats | Derek Ball | 3,785 | 6.1 | −1.0 |
| National | Rod Scarborough | 1,283 | 2.1 | +2.1 |
| Independent | John Buik | 509 | 0.8 | +0.8 |
| Unite Australia | Bob Manhire | 418 | 0.7 | +0.7 |
| Independent | Brian Rooney | 294 | 0.5 | +0.5 |
| Total formal votes | | 62,265 | 90.8 | |
| Informal votes | | 6,311 | 9.2 | |
| Turnout | | 68,576 | 93.7 | |
Two-party-preferred result
| Labor | Mick Young | 41,276 | 66.3 | −1.5 |
| Liberal | Barry Blundell | 20,979 | 33.7 | +1.5 |
| Labor hold | | Swing | −1.5 | |

==== 1984 ====
1984 Australian federal election: Port Adelaide
| Party | Candidate | Votes | % | ±% |
|---|---|---|---|---|
| Labor | Mick Young | 37,440 | 62.2 | −2.0 |
| Liberal | Thomas Ireland | 17,208 | 28.6 | +1.9 |
| Democrats | Robert Manhire | 4,295 | 7.1 | +3.6 |
| Socialist Workers | Deborah Gordon | 1,294 | 2.1 | −2.2 |
| Total formal votes | | 60,237 | 89.3 | |
| Informal votes | | 7,201 | 10.7 | |
| Turnout | | 67,438 | 94.8 | |
Two-party-preferred result
| Labor | Mick Young | 40,855 | 67.8 | −2.6 |
| Liberal | Thomas Ireland | 19,375 | 32.2 | +2.6 |
| Labor hold | | Swing | −2.6 | |

==== 1983 ====
1983 Australian federal election: Port Adelaide
| Party | Candidate | Votes | % | ±% |
|---|---|---|---|---|
| Labor | Mick Young | 48,865 | 68.0 | +5.0 |
| Liberal | Robin Rickards | 16,567 | 23.0 | −5.3 |
| Socialist Workers | Robert Fisher | 3,093 | 4.3 | +4.3 |
| Democrats | Benjamin Michael | 2,484 | 3.5 | −3.5 |
| Communist | Donald Sutherland | 888 | 1.2 | −0.6 |
| Total formal votes | | 71,897 | 95.9 | |
| Informal votes | | 3,086 | 4.1 | |
| Turnout | | 74,983 | 94.5 | |
Two-party-preferred result
| Labor | Mick Young | | 74.2 | +5.4 |
| Liberal | Robin Rickards | | 25.8 | −5.4 |
| Labor hold | | Swing | +5.4 | |

==== 1980 ====
1980 Australian federal election: Port Adelaide
| Party | Candidate | Votes | % | ±% |
|---|---|---|---|---|
| Labor | Mick Young | 43,746 | 63.0 | +3.0 |
| Liberal | Shirley de Garis | 19,580 | 28.2 | −2.2 |
| Democrats | Robert Manhire | 4,846 | 7.0 | −0.3 |
| Communist | Elliott Johnston | 1,261 | 1.8 | −0.5 |
| Total formal votes | | 69,433 | 96.1 | |
| Informal votes | | 2,837 | 3.9 | |
| Turnout | | 72,270 | 94.9 | |
Two-party-preferred result
| Labor | Mick Young | | 68.8 | +3.1 |
| Liberal | Shirley de Garis | | 31.2 | −3.1 |
| Labor hold | | Swing | +3.1 | |

=== Elections in the 1970s ===
==== 1977 ====
1977 Australian federal election: Port Adelaide
| Party | Candidate | Votes | % | ±% |
|---|---|---|---|---|
| Labor | Mick Young | 40,497 | 60.0 | −0.1 |
| Liberal | Jean Lawrie | 20,506 | 30.4 | −4.7 |
| Democrats | David Wade | 4,906 | 7.3 | +7.3 |
| Communist | Donald Sutherland | 1,575 | 2.3 | +2.3 |
| Total formal votes | | 67,484 | 94.5 | |
| Informal votes | | 3,914 | 5.5 | |
| Turnout | | 71,398 | 94.7 | |
Two-party-preferred result
| Labor | Mick Young | | 65.7 | +4.4 |
| Liberal | Jean Lawrie | | 34.3 | −4.4 |
| Labor hold | | Swing | +4.4 | |

==== 1975 ====
1975 Australian federal election: Port Adelaide
| Party | Candidate | Votes | % | ±% |
|---|---|---|---|---|
| Labor | Mick Young | 34,701 | 60.1 | −5.2 |
| Liberal | Terence Hanson | 20,285 | 35.1 | +11.1 |
| Liberal Movement | Jean Lawrie | 2,734 | 4.7 | −1.9 |
| Total formal votes | | 57,720 | 96.5 | |
| Informal votes | | 2,092 | 3.5 | |
| Turnout | | 59,812 | 96.5 | |
Two-party-preferred result
| Labor | Mick Young | | 61.3 | −9.6 |
| Liberal | Terence Hanson | | 38.7 | +9.6 |
| Labor hold | | Swing | −9.6 | |

==== 1974 ====
1974 Australian federal election: Port Adelaide
| Party | Candidate | Votes | % | ±% |
|---|---|---|---|---|
| Labor | Mick Young | 36,678 | 65.3 | −4.4 |
| Liberal | Clarence Hinson | 13,464 | 24.0 | −0.3 |
| Liberal Movement | Jean Lawrie | 3,701 | 6.6 | +6.6 |
| Independent | James Mitchell | 1,423 | 2.5 | +0.5 |
| Australia | Alan Jamieson | 904 | 1.6 | +1.6 |
| Total formal votes | | 56,170 | 95.8 | |
| Informal votes | | 2,463 | 4.2 | |
| Turnout | | 58,633 | 96.4 | |
Two-party-preferred result
| Labor | Mick Young | | 70.9 | −0.6 |
| Liberal | Clarence Hinson | | 29.1 | +0.6 |
| Labor hold | | Swing | −0.6 | |

==== 1972 ====
1972 Australian federal election: Port Adelaide
| Party | Candidate | Votes | % | ±% |
|---|---|---|---|---|
| Labor | Fred Birrell | 35,572 | 69.7 | −0.8 |
| Liberal | Ian Fotheringham | 12,398 | 24.3 | +2.0 |
| Democratic Labor | Leon Dalle-Nogare | 2,085 | 4.1 | +4.1 |
| Independent | James Mitchell | 996 | 2.0 | +2.0 |
| Total formal votes | | 51,051 | 96.0 | |
| Informal votes | | 2,105 | 4.0 | |
| Turnout | | 53,156 | 96.1 | |
Two-party-preferred result
| Labor | Fred Birrell | | 71.5 | −2.0 |
| Liberal | Ian Fotheringham | | 28.5 | +2.0 |
| Labor hold | | Swing | −2.0 | |

=== Elections in the 1960s ===
==== 1969 ====
1969 Australian federal election: Port Adelaide
| Party | Candidate | Votes | % | ±% |
|---|---|---|---|---|
| Labor | Fred Birrell | 35,147 | 70.5 | +13.1 |
| Liberal | Reginald Appelkamp | 12,409 | 24.9 | −6.3 |
| Social Credit | Denis McEvoy | 1,399 | 2.8 | −1.6 |
| Communist | Jim Moss | 887 | 1.8 | −0.4 |
| Total formal votes | | 49,842 | 94.8 | |
| Informal votes | | 2,734 | 5.2 | |
| Turnout | | 52,576 | 95.7 | |
Two-party-preferred result
| Labor | Fred Birrell | | 73.5 | +11.0 |
| Liberal | Reginald Appelkamp | | 26.5 | −11.0 |
| Labor hold | | Swing | +11.0 | |

==== 1966 ====
1966 Australian federal election: Port Adelaide
| Party | Candidate | Votes | % | ±% |
|---|---|---|---|---|
| Labor | Fred Birrell | 23,766 | 57.4 | −18.8 |
| Liberal | Peter Balnaves | 12,911 | 31.2 | +31.2 |
| Democratic Labor | Michael Bowler | 1,973 | 4.8 | −15.4 |
| Social Credit | Denis McEvoy | 1,803 | 4.4 | +4.4 |
| Communist | Jim Moss | 918 | 2.2 | −1.4 |
| Total formal votes | | 41,371 | 94.4 | |
| Informal votes | | 2,468 | 5.6 | |
| Turnout | | 43,839 | 96.2 | |
Two-party-preferred result
| Labor | Fred Birrell | | 62.5 | −16.9 |
| Liberal | Peter Balnaves | | 37.5 | +37.5 |
| Labor hold | | Swing | −16.9 | |

==== 1963 ====
1963 Australian federal election: Port Adelaide
| Party | Candidate | Votes | % | ±% |
|---|---|---|---|---|
| Labor | Fred Birrell | 30,994 | 76.2 | +4.4 |
| Democratic Labor | George Basisovs | 8,219 | 20.2 | +12.3 |
| Communist | Jim Moss | 1,463 | 3.6 | +1.4 |
| Total formal votes | | 40,676 | 94.8 | |
| Informal votes | | 2,230 | 5.2 | |
| Turnout | | 42,906 | 96.4 | |
Two-party-preferred result
| Labor | Fred Birrell | | 79.4 | +4.2 |
| Democratic Labor | George Basisovs | | 20.6 | +20.6 |
| Labor hold | | Swing | +4.2 | |

==== 1961 ====
1961 Australian federal election: Port Adelaide
| Party | Candidate | Votes | % | ±% |
|---|---|---|---|---|
| Labor | Albert Thompson | 30,046 | 71.8 | +3.1 |
| Liberal | Kimball Kelly | 7,556 | 18.1 | −5.6 |
| Democratic Labor | George Basisovs | 3,290 | 7.9 | +2.2 |
| Communist | Peter Symon | 938 | 2.2 | +0.3 |
| Total formal votes | | 41,830 | 95.6 | |
| Informal votes | | 1,929 | 4.4 | |
| Turnout | | 43,759 | 96.2 | |
Two-party-preferred result
| Labor | Albert Thompson | | 75.2 | +3.7 |
| Liberal | Kimball Kelly | | 24.8 | −3.7 |
| Labor hold | | Swing | +3.7 | |

=== Elections in the 1950s ===
==== 1958 ====
1958 Australian federal election: Port Adelaide
| Party | Candidate | Votes | % | ±% |
|---|---|---|---|---|
| Labor | Albert Thompson | 28,627 | 68.7 | −16.0 |
| Liberal | David Garvie | 9,875 | 23.7 | +23.7 |
| Democratic Labor | Gerald Shinnick | 2,386 | 5.7 | +5.7 |
| Communist | Peter Symon | 795 | 1.9 | −13.4 |
| Total formal votes | | 41,683 | 96.1 | |
| Informal votes | | 1,683 | 3.9 | |
| Turnout | | 43,366 | 96.7 | |
Two-party-preferred result
| Labor | Albert Thompson | | 71.5 | −13.2 |
| Liberal | David Garvie | | 28.5 | +28.5 |
| Labor hold | | Swing | −13.2 | |

==== 1955 ====
1955 Australian federal election: Port Adelaide
| Party | Candidate | Votes | % | ±% |
|---|---|---|---|---|
| Labor | Albert Thompson | 32,813 | 84.7 | −9.3 |
| Communist | Peter Symon | 5,918 | 15.3 | +9.3 |
| Total formal votes | | 38,731 | 93.0 | |
| Informal votes | | 2,906 | 7.0 | |
| Turnout | | 41,637 | 96.1 | |
| Labor hold | | Swing | −9.3 | |

==== 1954 ====
1954 Australian federal election: Port Adelaide
| Party | Candidate | Votes | % | ±% |
|---|---|---|---|---|
| Labor | Albert Thompson | 47,355 | 94.0 | +22.7 |
| Communist | Alan Finger | 3,045 | 6.0 | +3.3 |
| Total formal votes | | 50,400 | 92.5 | |
| Informal votes | | 4,083 | 7.5 | |
| Turnout | | 54,483 | 96.2 | |
| Labor hold | | Swing | +20.2 | |

==== 1951 ====
1951 Australian federal election: Port Adelaide
| Party | Candidate | Votes | % | ±% |
|---|---|---|---|---|
| Labor | Albert Thompson | 33,979 | 71.3 | −0.2 |
| Liberal | John Caskey | 12,342 | 25.9 | −0.6 |
| Communist | Alan Finger | 1,304 | 2.7 | +0.7 |
| Total formal votes | | 47,625 | 97.7 | |
| Informal votes | | 1,129 | 2.3 | |
| Turnout | | 48,754 | 96.6 | |
Two-party-preferred result
| Labor | Albert Thompson | | 73.8 | +0.5 |
| Liberal | John Caskey | | 26.2 | −0.5 |
| Labor hold | | Swing | +0.5 | |

=== Elections in the 1940s ===
==== 1949 ====
1949 Australian federal election: Port Adelaide
| Party | Candidate | Votes | % | ±% |
|---|---|---|---|---|
| Labor | Albert Thompson | 31,977 | 71.5 | +0.0 |
| Liberal | Frederick Boscombe | 11,879 | 26.5 | +8.1 |
| Communist | Peter Symon | 889 | 2.0 | −8.1 |
| Total formal votes | | 44,745 | 97.9 | |
| Informal votes | | 950 | 2.1 | |
| Turnout | | 45,695 | 96.2 | |
Two-party-preferred result
| Labor | Albert Thompson | | 73.3 | −7.3 |
| Liberal | Frederick Boscombe | | 26.7 | +7.3 |
| Labor notional hold | | Swing | −7.3 | |
