= Combe–Ivanov affair =

1983 political scandal in Australia

The Combe–Ivanov affair was an Australian political scandal of 1983. A Soviet diplomat and KGB spy, Valery Ivanov, was expelled after he was found to have compromised a senior Australian Labor Party (ALP) figure, David Combe. The affair also claimed the political scalp of a minister, Mick Young, and resulted in a Royal Commission being established under Justice Robert Hope to review Australia's security and intelligence agencies.

== The affair ==
In 1983, David Combe, lobbyist and former National Secretary of the Australian Labor Party (ALP), was accused of compromising Australia's national security in dealings with a Soviet diplomat, Valery Ivanov.

The so-called Combe–Ivanov affair developed out of a trip Combe and his wife made to the USSR in 1982, in the course of preparations for which they met and developed a relationship with Valery Ivanov, then the First Secretary at the Soviet Embassy in Canberra. Soon after the formation of the Hawke government in March 1983, the Australian Security Intelligence Organisation (ASIO) raised concerns that Combe, still closely aligned to the ALP, might be being compromised by a Soviet citizen with KGB links. Ivanov was expelled from Australia on 22 April 1983 by Prime Minister Bob Hawke. Ministers were also directed not to use Combe's lobbying services, although the reason for this was not made known to them at the time.

On 17 May, Justice Robert Hope was commissioned to investigate the affair but also to review the general progress of the intelligence agencies he had inquired into in 1974-77 at the behest of Gough Whitlam (his first reports were handed down in 1975, during Malcolm Fraser's premiership).

Mick Young, the Special Minister of State and Vice-President of the Executive Council (and himself a former ALP National Secretary 1969-72), was forced to stand down from the Ministry on 14 July when it was revealed he had breached Cabinet security, having talked to a journalist immediately after the 21 April Cabinet decision to expel Ivanov.

In December 1983, Justice Hope reported that David Combe had indeed been targeted by the Soviets, but there was no proof of intelligence breaches or of any threat to national security; and that with Ivanov’s expulsion there was no longer any reason to limit Combe’s access to ministers. Cabinet decided to set up a register of lobbyists. Registration would be voluntary, but unregistered lobbyists would have no access to ministers or officials.

Mick Young returned to the Cabinet in January 1984. Combe was later appointed Australian Trade Commissioner to Canada and Hong Kong.
