= Pat Clancy (trade unionist) =

Australian trade unionist (1919–1987)

Patrick Martin Clancy
- Born: 21 January 1919; Redfern, Sydney
- Died: 1987 (aged 67–68); Mumbai, India
- Other name: (Pat)
- Organizations: Building Workers' Industrial Union; Labor Council of New South Wales; Australian Council of Trade Unions
- Political party: Communist Party of Australia; Socialist Party of Australia

Patrick Martin Clancy (21 January 1919 – 24 July 1987) was an Australian trade unionist and communist.

Clancy was born at Redfern in Sydney to grocer Denis Edward Clancy and Olive, née Kitchen. He attended St Peter's De La Salle School in Surry Hills, leaving at the age of 14 to work in a boot pattern factory. He was briefly apprenticed in the printing industry before working in a battery factory. He played rugby league with the junior Balmain Tigers in 1936 and was also an amateur boxer. In 1937, he won 22s 6d in a professional fight at Leichhardt, which allowed him to afford a fare to Port Kembla where he was apprenticed as a bricklayer. The 1938–39 dispute over exporting pig-iron to Japan, and the 1940 strike, raised his political awareness. On 10 August 1940, he married machinist Alma May Thomas at St Francis Xavier's Catholic Church in Wollongong.

Clancy joined the United Operative Bricklayers' Trade Union Society in 1941 and was elected to the committee in 1942. He became secretary of the South Coast district council of the Building Workers' Industrial Union (BWIU) in February 1943. After studying Marxism with the intention of converting his socialist wife to Catholicism, he became a Marxist himself and joined the Communist Party of Australia in 1943. He was also elected to the Labor Council of New South Wales, becoming a vice-president.

After his election as a state organiser of the BWIU in 1944, Clancy moved to Revesby, and continued his involvement in the Communist Party. He became assistant secretary of the BWIU in 1947 and secretary in 1953, ultimately rising to become federal secretary in 1973. He was a building group representative on the Australian Council of Trade Unions' executive from 1970 to 1973 and 1975 to 1979. He retired as federal secretary in 1985 and became honorary chair of the union's international department. He had become completely blind in 1980 as a result of diabetes.

Clancy contested numerous elections for the Communist Party, and was on the central committee executive during the 1968 split after the Soviet Union's invasion of Czechoslovakia. He resigned from the party in 1971, and in December of that year became president of the new Socialist Party of Australia. Disagreement among members led to his removal and resignation from the party in 1983. Attempting to reunite the far left, he formed the Association for Communist Unity in 1984.

Clancy's interest in classical music saw him serve from 1973 to 1978 as the trade union representative on the board of the Australian Opera, and he was a passionate supporter of the South Sydney Rabbitohs. He was awarded the Order of People's Friendship by the Soviet Union in 1979 and was included on the New South Wales Labor Council's list of leading unionists in 1980. He died of a heart attack in 1987, at Mumbai in India, while returning from a peace conference in Mongolia.
