= Ruby Hammond =

Aboriginal Australian activist

- Born: 1936; Blackford, South Australia
- Died: 16 April 1993 (aged 56–57); Adelaide, South Australia
- Occupation: Aboriginal rights activist

Ruby Florence Hammond PSM (1936 - 16 April 1993) was an Australian Indigenous rights campaigner and the first Indigenous South Australian to seek election to the Federal Parliament.

Hammond was born in 1936 in Blackford, an independent Aboriginal community on the south-east coast of South Australia, and was a member of the Tanganekald group of the Ngarrindjeri people of the Coorong. Ruby obtained school certificate in 1952 but the tough conditions at work in a shop made her touch racism against her.

At the age of 32 she became a member of the Council of Aboriginal Women of South Australia and was active throughout the 1970s and 1980s in the pursuit of equal rights for Aboriginal people, including professional roles at the Aboriginal Legal Rights Movement, the Department of Personnel and Industrial Relations and the National Women's Consultative Council (successor to the National Women's Advisory Council, later Australian Council for Women). She acted as a consultant to the 1977 Australian Law Reform Commission into Aboriginal Customary Laws which considered whether it was desirable to apply Aboriginal customary law to Aboriginals. The commission's report outlined Aboriginal customary laws were not generally recognised by general Australian law, yet were a significant influence on Aboriginal people. The report recommended that Aboriginal people should have the final say in the recognition of customary law.

Hammond was appointed by the Whitlam Government to the Australian National Advisory Committee on International Women's year (1975). In 1980, Hammond advocated for a treaty which recognised Aboriginal sovereignty. Speaking as representative for the Aboriginal Land Rights Support Group, Hammond argued "we are the national minority; it is a treaty between two nations. The government must agree and recognise that we were here first".

In 1988, she ran in the by-election for the Federal seat of Port Adelaide, becoming the first Indigenous South Australian to do so.

In 1990, Hammond was appointed Head of the Aboriginal Issues Unit for the Royal Commission into Aboriginal Deaths in Custody. Hammond served as Aboriginal Coordinator for the South Australian Department of Arts and Cultural Heritage from 1991 to 1993. In 1991, she joined with singer Archie Roach to publicly demand an inquiry into the Stolen Generations. In January 1993 Hammond was awarded the Australian Public Service Medal, which was presented to her by Her Excellency the Governor of South Australia, Dame Roma Mitchell. She received a posthumous award for equal opportunity achievement in 1993.

== Legacy ==
In 2002 an artwork recognising Hammond's contributions to the advancement of Indigenous Australians was included in Reconciliation Place, Canberra. The artwork was designed by "Munnari" John Hammond, her son.

The electoral district of Hammond in South Australia is named in recognition of her contributions. Her name is also inscribed on the Port Adelaide Workers Memorial.
