= David Combe =

Australian politician (1943–2019)

National Secretary of the Australian Labor Party
- In office 10 July 1973 – 28 July 1981
- Preceded by: Mick Young
- Succeeded by: Bob McMullan

Personal details
- Born: Harvey David Mathew Combe; 26 April 1943 Adelaide, South Australia
- Died: 21 September 2019 (aged 76)
- Spouse(s): Meena Blesing, Maggie Gilchrist
- Education: Prince Alfred College and the University of Adelaide
- Occupation: Political official, lobbyist, Australian Trade Commissioner in Canada and Hong Kong
- Known for: National Secretary, Australian Labor Party and involvement in a Russian spy scandal in 1983

Harvey David Mathew Combe (26 April 1943 – 21 September 2019) was National Secretary of the Australian Labor Party (ALP), a political consultant and lobbyist, an Australian Trade Commissioner, a Senior Vice-President International of Southcorp Wines, and a consultant to the Australian wine industry. He achieved a degree of unwanted prominence through the Combe-Ivanov affair of 1983.

== Early life ==
Harvey David Mathew Combe was born in 1943 in Adelaide, South Australia, and was educated at Prince Alfred College and the University of Adelaide where he earned a BA. He became interested in politics at university and joined the ALP, partly through his friendship with Don Dunstan. (He became Patron of the Don Dunstan Foundation in 2004.)

== Career ==
Combe was National Secretary of the Australian Labor Party (1973–1981), a political consultant and lobbyist (1981–1985), and an Australian senior trade commissioner (1985–1991), and held senior executive and board positions within the Australian wine industry (1991–2008).

=== Politics ===
In 1973 Combe became the youngest-ever National Secretary of the Australian Labor Party after the election of the first Labor government for 23 years. In November 1975, he was allegedly the co-instigator, with Gough Whitlam and Bill Hartley, of an unsuccessful approach to Saddam Hussein's Iraq for a gift of $US 500,000 to help fund Labor's 1975 election campaign. However former Labor Party leader, Bill Hayden, later Governor-General of Australia, in his autobiography published in 1996, reflected the doubts held by some about the blame attached to Combe over the episode when he said that " ... it appeared that the national secretary of the Party, David Combe, was being left isolated as a scapegoat in this fanciful escapade." In the event, Labor lost the 1975 election. In an article published in The Bulletin in January 1982 Combe suggested that Labor's defeat was partly due to the influence of the CIA. According to an article by C. J. Coventry, Combe had been an informer for the U.S. prior to the 1975 election.

Combe remained National Secretary until July 1981, when he resigned to establish a lobbying business, David Combe and Associates Pty Ltd. The firm reportedly "received a great fillip in March 1983, when the Labor Party was re-elected to office. Business perceived Combe as the most influential lobbyist then working in Canberra."

==== Combe-Ivanov affair ====
In 1983 Combe was accused of compromising Australia's national security in dealings with a Soviet diplomat, Valery Ivanov.

The Combe-Ivanov affair developed out of a trip Combe and his wife made to the USSR in 1982, in the course of preparations for which they met and developed a relationship with Valery Ivanov, then the First Secretary at the Soviet Embassy in Canberra. Soon after the formation of the Hawke government ASIO raised concerns that Combe, closely aligned to the ALP, might be being compromised by a Soviet citizen with KGB links. Ivanov was expelled from Australia in 1983 by Prime Minister Bob Hawke.

The highly publicised events were investigated by the Hope Royal Commission on Australia's security and intelligence agencies of 1983–1984. The commission found that Combe had indeed been targeted by the Soviets, but there was no proof of intelligence breaches or of any threat to national security. Speaking after Combe died on 21 September 2019, former Hawke government minister and NSW Labor Party Secretary Graham Richardson said that Combe's death had saddened him and that "David make a big contribution and the whole Ivanov thing ... well, he got short-changed." Richardson said that the handling of the Ivanov affair "... was a massive overreaction ... but we had no experience in dealing with that ... we didn't know what to do."

=== Trade commissioner ===
Combe was later appointed as Australia's senior trade commissioner in Western Canada from 1985 to 1989, and in Hong Kong from 1990 to 1991.

=== Wine industry ===
Combe was Senior Vice-President International and ran the European operations of Penfolds and Southcorp Wines during the rise in popularity of Australian wines in the 1990s. He is credited with developing significant export markets for Southcorp Wines, whose exports increased in value from $A 40 million in August 1991 to $A 300 million in June 2000. In 2000 Combe was named Australia's Top Export Salesman by Overseas Trading magazine and was included in the list of "Twenty Five Most Influential Australians in Asia" published by Business Asia magazine.

From March 2001 to November 2003 Combe was a non-executive director for the Western Australian wine producer Evans and Tate Limited.

In 2004, in a speech at Bordeaux, he lambasted the wine-purchasing policies of UK supermarkets, which, he said, "if committed in Australia, would represent major breaches of the trade practices laws".

In June 2004 he was appointed Chairman of Simon Gilbert Wines, He retired as a director and chairman in February 2007, "to take up another position within the wine industry".

== Portrait ==
In 1983, Keith Looby painted Combe's portrait. The portrait was an unsuccessful entry in the Archibald Prize of 1983, and conspiracy theories on this matter abound. David Combe said in 1998 that there was 'circumstantially a good case to believe that some trustees were heavied by the Party' into rejecting the work. In 1998, Combe donated his portrait to the collection of the National Portrait Gallery in Canberra, "through the Australian Government's Cultural Gifts Program".

== Death ==
Combe died on 21 September 2019, aged 76. The national president of the Labor Party, former deputy prime minister of Australia Wayne Swan, paid tribute to Combe saying that as national secretary of the party, he had "revolutionised the party's conferences, turning them from concealed and private affairs into public events which are now the largest political gatherings in Australia." His friend Richard Whitington, in an affectionate obituary, said that "the twists and turns in David Combe's life and career demanded courage and resilience of him and he displayed those qualities consistently and in abundance." Talking of Combe's work with the Labor Party, Whitington observed that, "He was a product of the Labor movement and a servant to it, motivated by strongly held beliefs in individual rights and Australia's potential as a more caring, compassionate and independent nation."

Party political offices
Preceded by Mick Young	National Secretary of the Australian Labor Party; 1973–1981	Succeeded by Bob McMullan
