= 1998 Australian House of Representatives election =

1998 Australian federal election
- 3 October 1998 (Note: The election in the seat of Newcastle was deferred to 21 November 1998.)

All 148 seats in the House of Representatives 75 seats were needed for a majority in the House 40 (of the 76) seats in the Senate
- Opinion polls
- Registered: 12,154,050 ▲3.52%
- Turnout: 11,545,201 (94.99%) (▼0.78 pp)
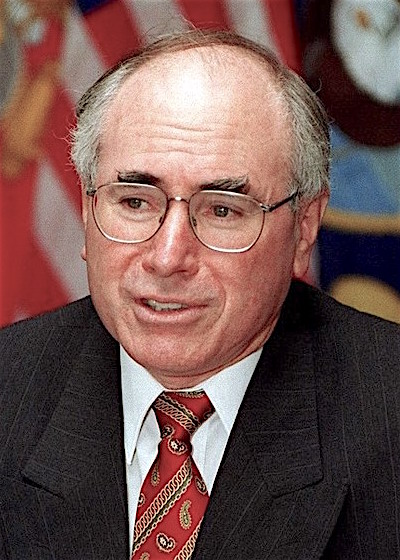

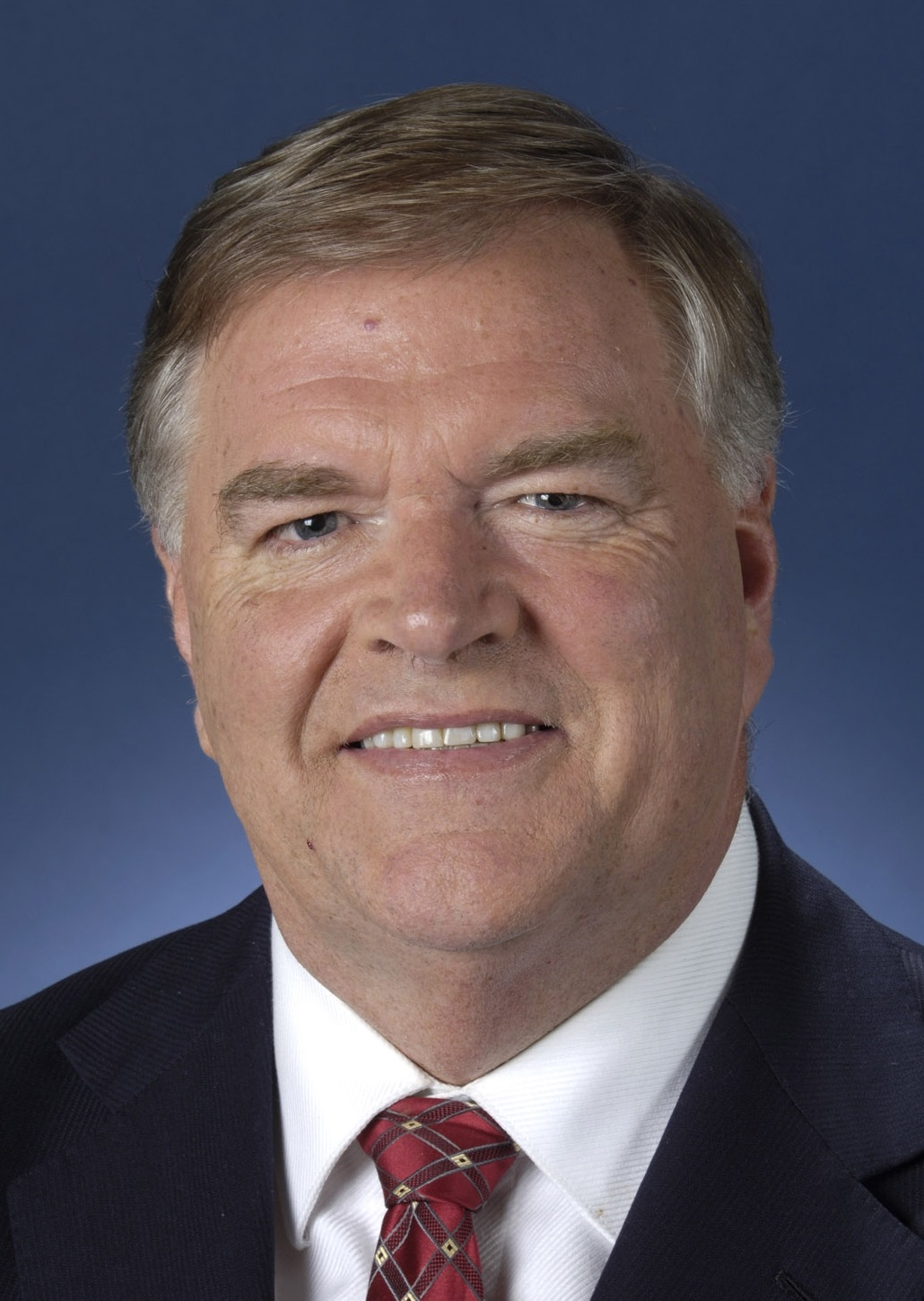
	First party	Second party
Leader	John Howard	Kim Beazley
Party	Liberal–National Coalition	Labor
Leader since	30 January 1995	19 March 1996
Leader's seat	Bennelong (NSW)	Brand (WA)
Last election	94 seats	49 seats
Seats before	94	49
Seats won	80	67
Seat change	▼14	▲18
Primary vote	4,388,809	4,454,306
Percentage	39.51%	40.10%
Swing	▼7.73%	▲1.34%
TPP	49.02%	50.98%
TPP swing	▼4.61	▲4.61
Prime Minister before election
John Howard
Liberal/National coalition
Subsequent Prime Minister
John Howard
Liberal/National coalition

The following tables show results for the Australian House of Representatives at the 1998 federal election held on 3 October 1998.

== Australia ==
House of Reps (IRV) – 1998–2001 – Turnout 94.99% (CV) — Informal 3.78%
Party	Votes	%	Swing	Seats	Change
Labor	4,454,306	40.10	+1.34	67	▲18
Liberal	3,764,707	33.89	−4.80	64	▼11
National	588,088	5.29	−2.91	16	▼2
Country Liberal	36,014	0.32	−0.03	0	▼1
Liberal/National Coalition	4,388,809	39.51	-7.74	80	▼14
One Nation	936,621	8.43	*		
Democrats	569,875	5.13	−1.63		
Greens (Note: Australian Greens includes Greens Western Australia.)	290,709	2.62	−0.30		
Independents (Note: Pauline Hanson has been counted as an independent for the 1996 election. She had been disendorsed as the Liberal candidate and ran as an independent, but she remained a Liberal on the ballot paper.)	195,180	1.76	−0.51	1	▼4
Unity	87,252	0.79	*		
Christian Democrats (Note: Christian Democrats includes CTA Child Protection Party.)	64,916	0.58	+0.18		
Australia First	28,069	0.25	*		
Natural Law	18,425	0.17	-0.21		
Australian Shooters Party	12,675	0.11	*		
Democratic Socialist Electoral League	9,749	0.09	*		
Citizens Electoral Council	8,293	0.07	*		
Progressive Labour	6,122	0.06	*		
No Aircraft Noise	5,298	0.05	−0.12		
Tasmania First	4,551	0.04	*		
Australian Reform Party	4,220	0.04	*		
Abolish Child Support/Family Court Party	2,312	0.02	*		
Women's Party	1,426	0.01	−0.05		
Family Law Reform	1,199	0.01	*		
Communist Party of Australia (current)	801	0.00	+0.00		
Socialist Equality	531	0.00	*		
Independent EFF	513	0.00	*		
Republican	403	0.00	+0.00		
Not Affiliated	14,793	0.13	+0.01		
Total	11,109,063			148	
Two-party-preferred vote
Liberal/National coalition	5,413,431	49.02	−4.61	80	▼14
Labor	5,630,409	50.98	+4.61	67	▲18
Invalid/blank votes	436,138	3.78			
Turnout	11,545,201	95.0			
Registered voters	12,154,050				
Source: Federal Elections 1998

== States ==
=== New South Wales ===
1998 Australian federal election (New South Wales)
- 3 October 1998

All 50 New South Wales seats in the Australian House of Representatives and 6 seats in the Australian Senate
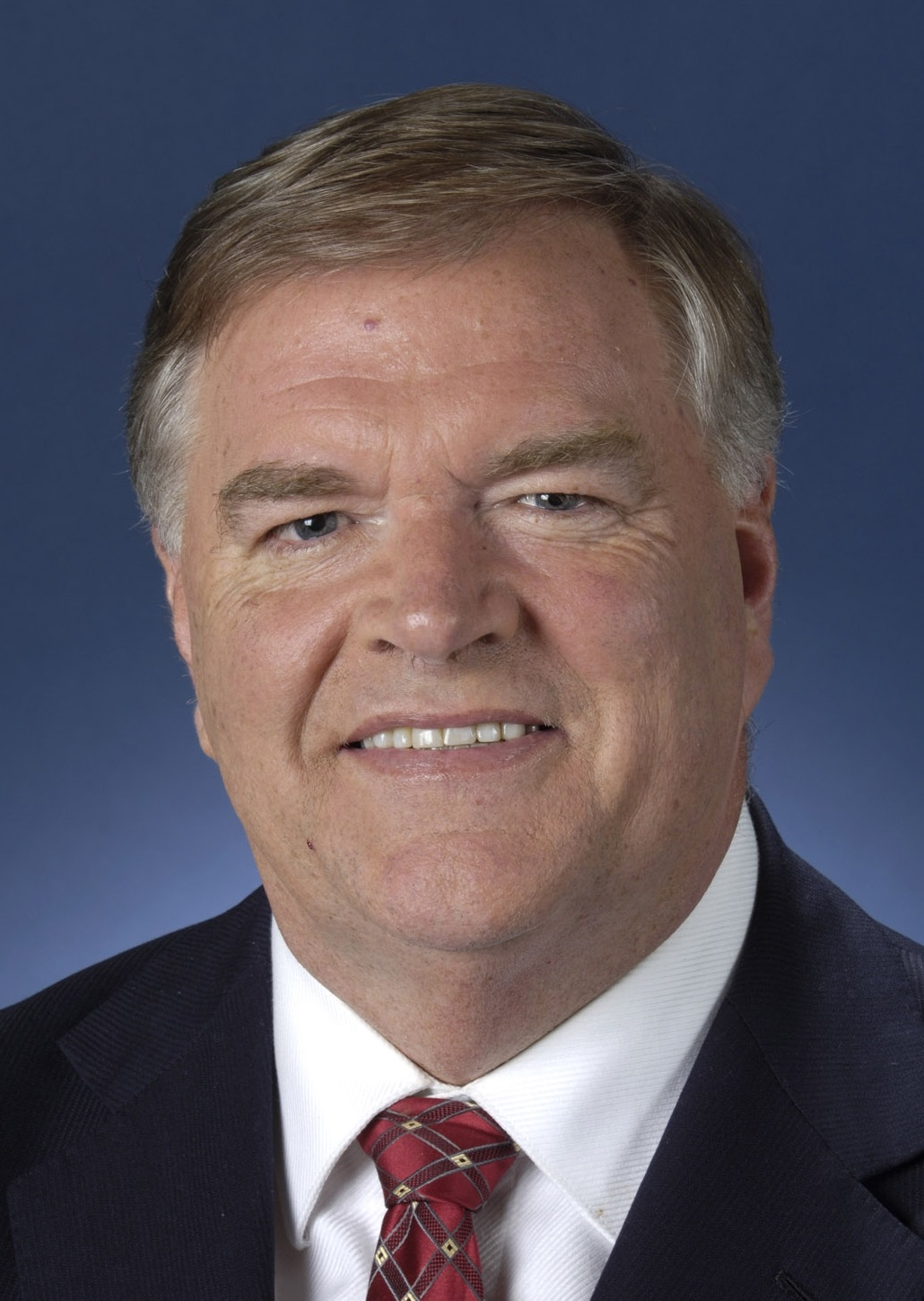

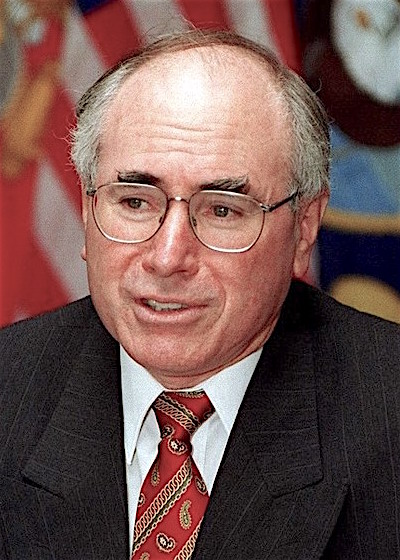
	First party	Second party
Leader	Kim Beazley	John Howard
Party	Labor	Liberal/National coalition
Last election	20 seats	29 seats
Seats won	22 seats	27 seats
Seat change	▲2	▼2
Popular vote	1,489,021	1,424,671
Percentage	40.1%	38.4%
Swing	▲0.5	▼7.5
TPP	51.54%	48.46%
TPP swing	▲4.11	▼4.11

Turnout 96.4% (CV) — Informal 3.6%
Party	Votes	%	Swing	Seats	Change
Liberal	1,131,545	30.49	−2.97	18	▼1
National	293,126	7.90	−4.17	9	▼1
Liberal/National Coalition	1,424,671	38.39	−7.14	27	▼2
Labor	1,489,021	40.12	+0.56	22	▲2
One Nation	332,510	8.96	+8.96		
Democrats	154,496	4.16	−2.38		
Greens	98,647	2.66	+0.14		
Independents	96,719	2.61	+0.20	1	Steady
Unity	57,666	1.55	+1.55		
Christian Democrats	38,023	1.02	+0.10		
No Aircraft Noise	5,298	0.14			
Democratic Socialist	3,296	0.09	1.37		
Natural Law	3,065	0.08	0.31		
Citizens Electoral Council	2,332	0.06			
Progressive Labour	1,131	0.03			
Australia First	1,024	0.03			
Abolish Child Support	544	0.01			
Socialist Equality	531	0.01			
No GST	240	0.01			
Republican	227	0.01			
Total	3,711,144			50	
Two-party-preferred vote
Liberal/National Coalition	1,766,640	48.46	−4.11	27	▼2
Labor	1,879,281	51.54	+4.11	22	▲2
Invalid/blank votes	217,024	5.4			
Turnout	3,866,083	94.8			
Registered voters	4,076,081				
Source: Federal Elections 1998

=== Victoria ===
1998 Australian federal election (Victoria)
- 3 October 1998

All 37 Victorian seats in the Australian House of Representatives and 6 seats in the Australian Senate
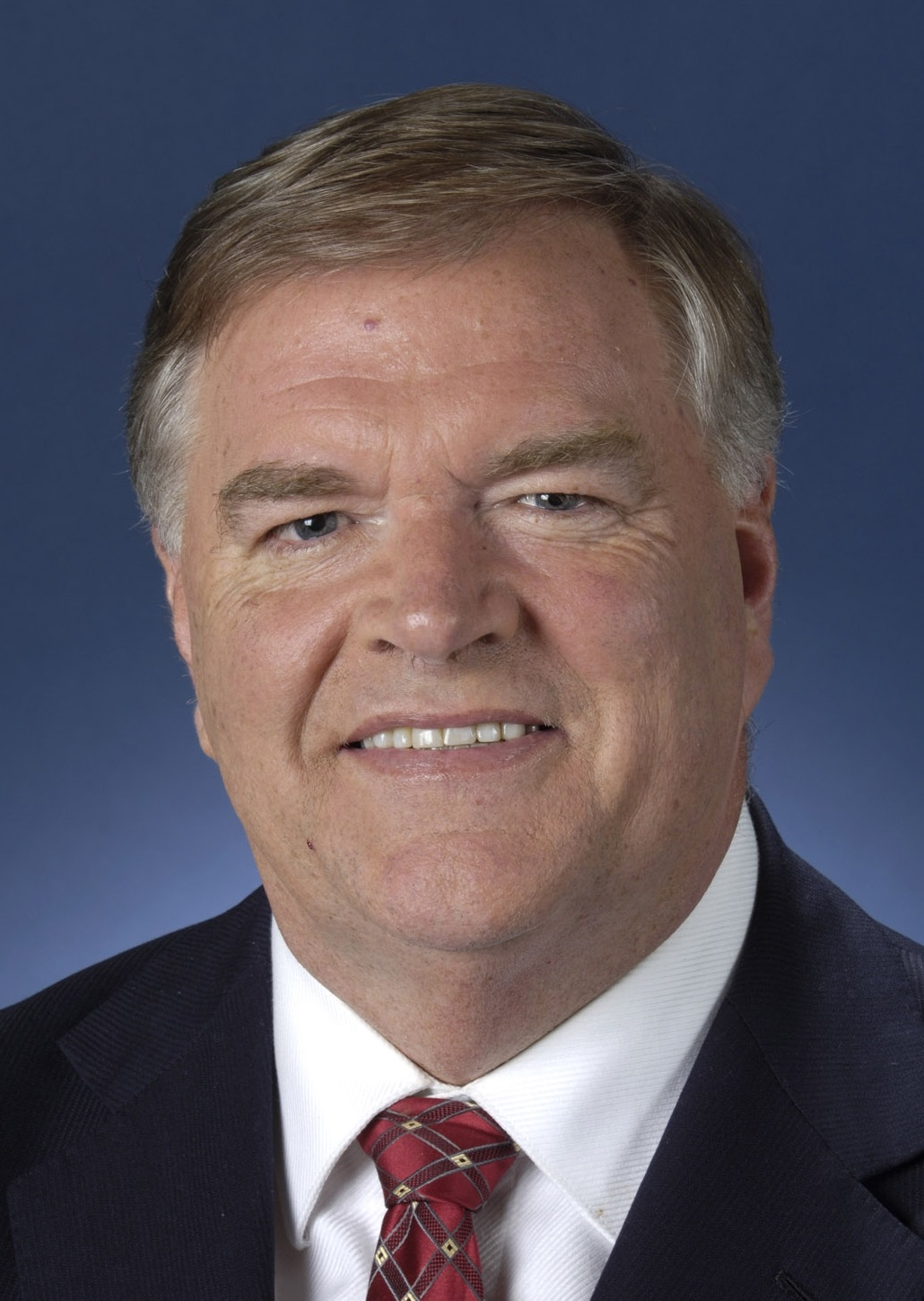

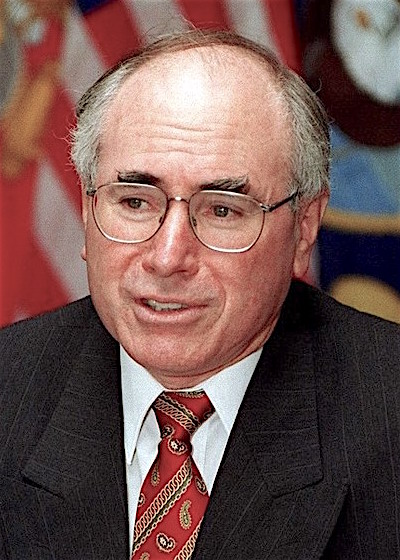
	First party	Second party
Leader	Kim Beazley	John Howard
Party	Labor	Liberal/National coalition
Last election	16 seats	21 seats
Seats won	19 seats	18 seats
Seat change	▲3	▼3
Popular vote	1,261,289	1,131,375
Percentage	44.4%	39.8%
Swing	▲1.5	▼4.8
TPP	53.53%	46.47%
TPP swing	▲3.22	▼3.22
- Results by division for the House of Representatives, shaded by winning party's margin of victory.

Turnout 95.6% (CV) — Informal 3.5%
Party	Votes	%	Swing	Seats	Change
Liberal	1,053,990	37.08	-2.82	16	▼3
National	77,385	2.72	-1.90	2	Steady
Liberal/National Coalition	1,131,375	39.80	-4.72	18	▼3
Labor	1,261,289	44.37	1.45	19	▲3
Democrats	171,091	6.02	-1.33		
One Nation	105,798	3.72	3.72		
Greens	59,383	2.09	0.19		
Independent	38,232	1.34	-0.29		
Unity	29,265	1.03	1.03		
Shooters	12,675	0.45	0.45		
Natural Law	9,654	0.34	0.00		
Australia First	6,455	0.23	0.00		
Progressive Labour	4,991	0.18	0.00		
Reform	4,220	0.15	0.00		
Christian Democrats	3,793	0.13	0.00		
Citizens Electoral Council	2,914	0.10	0.00		
Abolish Child Support	945	0.03	0.00		
Democratic Socialist	425	0.01	0.00		
Republican	176	0.01	0.00		
Total	2,842,681			37	
Two-party-preferred vote
Labor	1,521,560	53.53	3.22	19	▲3
Liberal/National Coalition	1,321,121	46.47	-3.22	18	▼3
Invalid/blank votes	103,524	3.5			
Turnout	2,946,205	95.6			
Registered voters	3,081,632				
Source: Federal Elections 1998

=== Queensland ===
1998 Australian federal election (Queensland)
- 3 October 1998

All 27 Queensland seats in the Australian House of Representatives and 6 seats in the Australian Senate
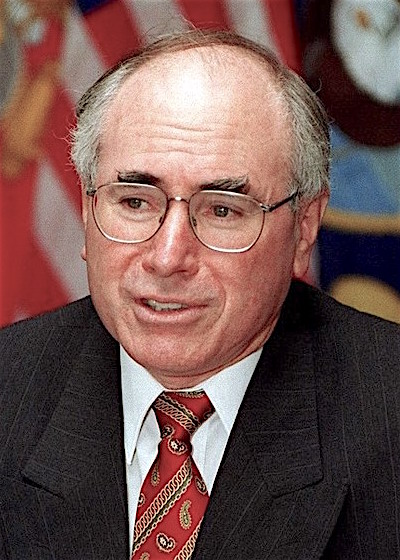

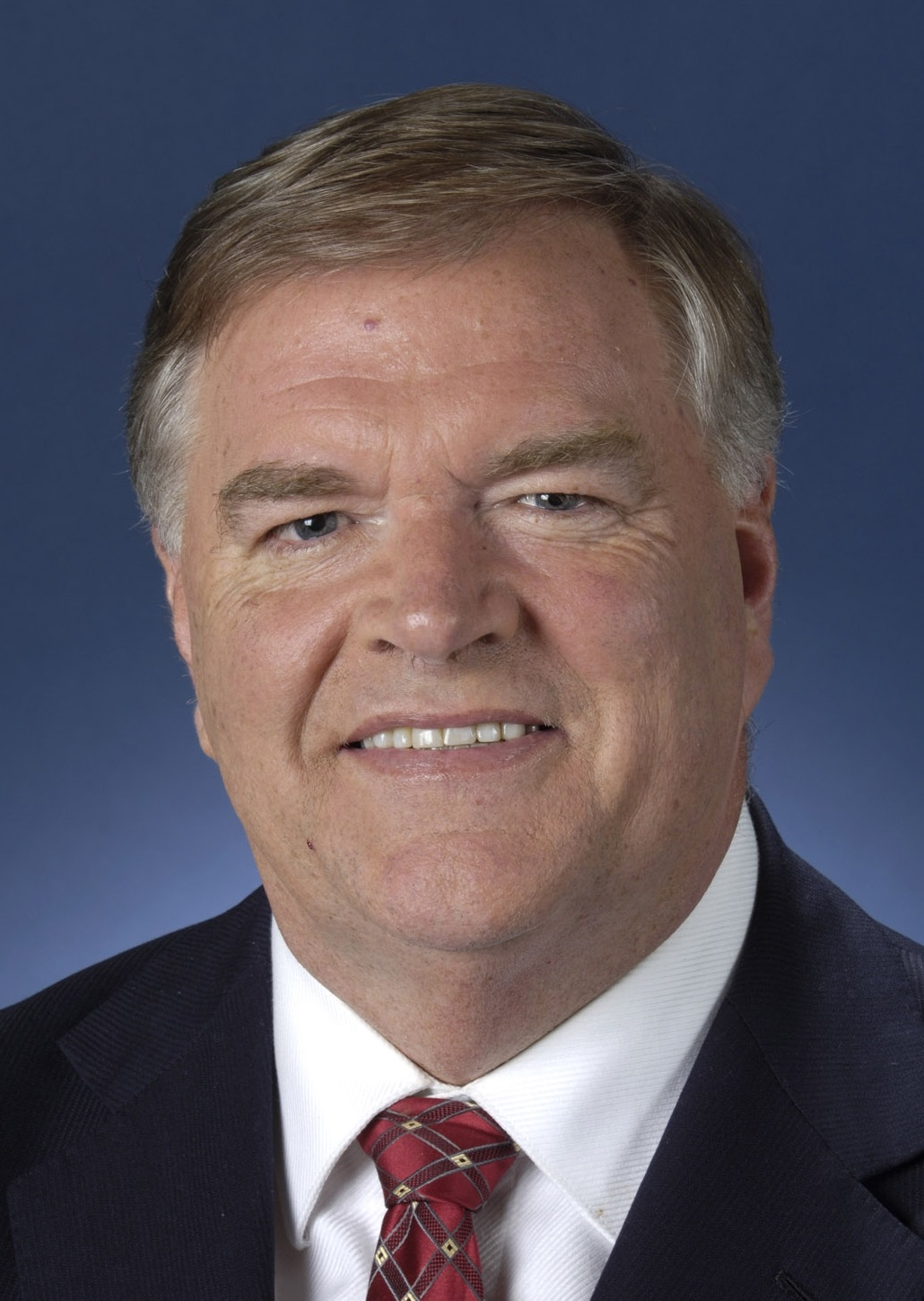

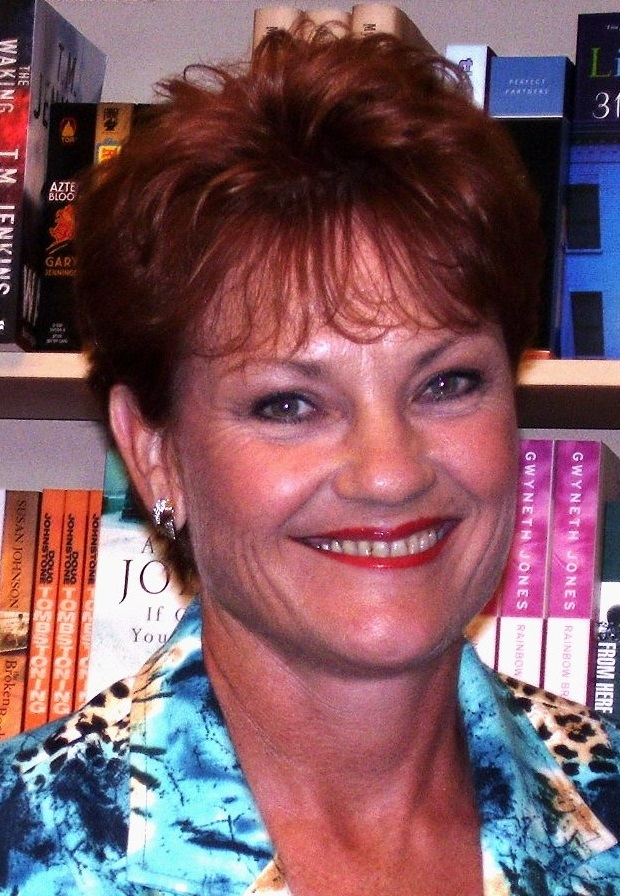
	First party	Second party	Third party
Leader	John Howard	Kim Beazley	Pauline Hanson
Party	Liberal/National coalition	Labor	One Nation
Last election	23 seats	2 seats	—
Seats before	23	2	1
Seats won	19	8	0
Seat change	▼4	▲6	▼1
Primary vote	814,338	719,743	285,983
Percentage	40.85%	36.11%	14.35%
Swing	▼14.35	▲2.91	▲14.35
TPP	53.05%	46.95%
TPP swing	▼7.17	▲7.17

Turnout 94.2% (CV) — Informal 3.2%
Party	Votes	%	Swing	Seats	Change
Liberal	615,153	30.86	-8.44	14	▼3
National	199,185	9.99	-5.91	5	▼1
Liberal/National Coalition	814,338	40.85	-14.35	19	▼4
Labor	719,743	36.11	2.91	8	▲6
One Nation	285,983	14.35	14.35		
Democrats	80,003	4.01	-2.69		
Greens	47,440	2.38	-2.42		
Independents	29,388	1.47	1.47		▼1
Christian Democrats	11,243	0.56	0.56		
Citizens Electoral Council	1,506	0.08	0.08		
Women's Party	1,426	0.07	0.00		
Family Law Reform	1,199	0.06	0.00		
Democratic Socialist	778	0.04	0.00		
Abolish Child Support	170	0.01	0.00		
Australia First	158	0.01	0.00		
Total	1,993,375			27	▲1
Two-party-preferred vote
Labor	935,867	46.95	7.17	8	▲6
Liberal/National Coalition	1,057,508	53.05	-7.17	19	▼4
Invalid/blank votes	68,659	3.2			
Turnout	2,062,034	94.2			
Registered voters	2,188,024				
Source: Federal Elections 1998

=== Western Australia ===
1998 Australian federal election (Western Australia)
- 3 October 1998

All 14 Western Australian seats in the Australian House of Representatives and 6 seats in the Australian Senate
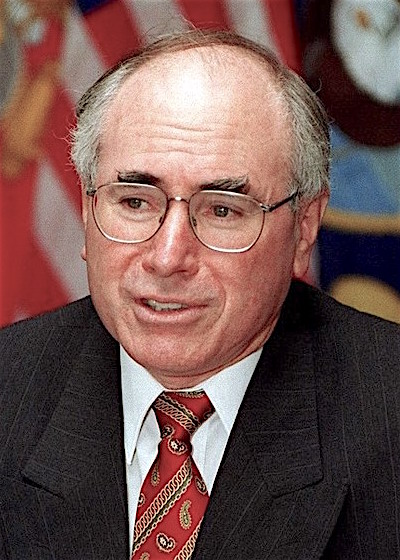

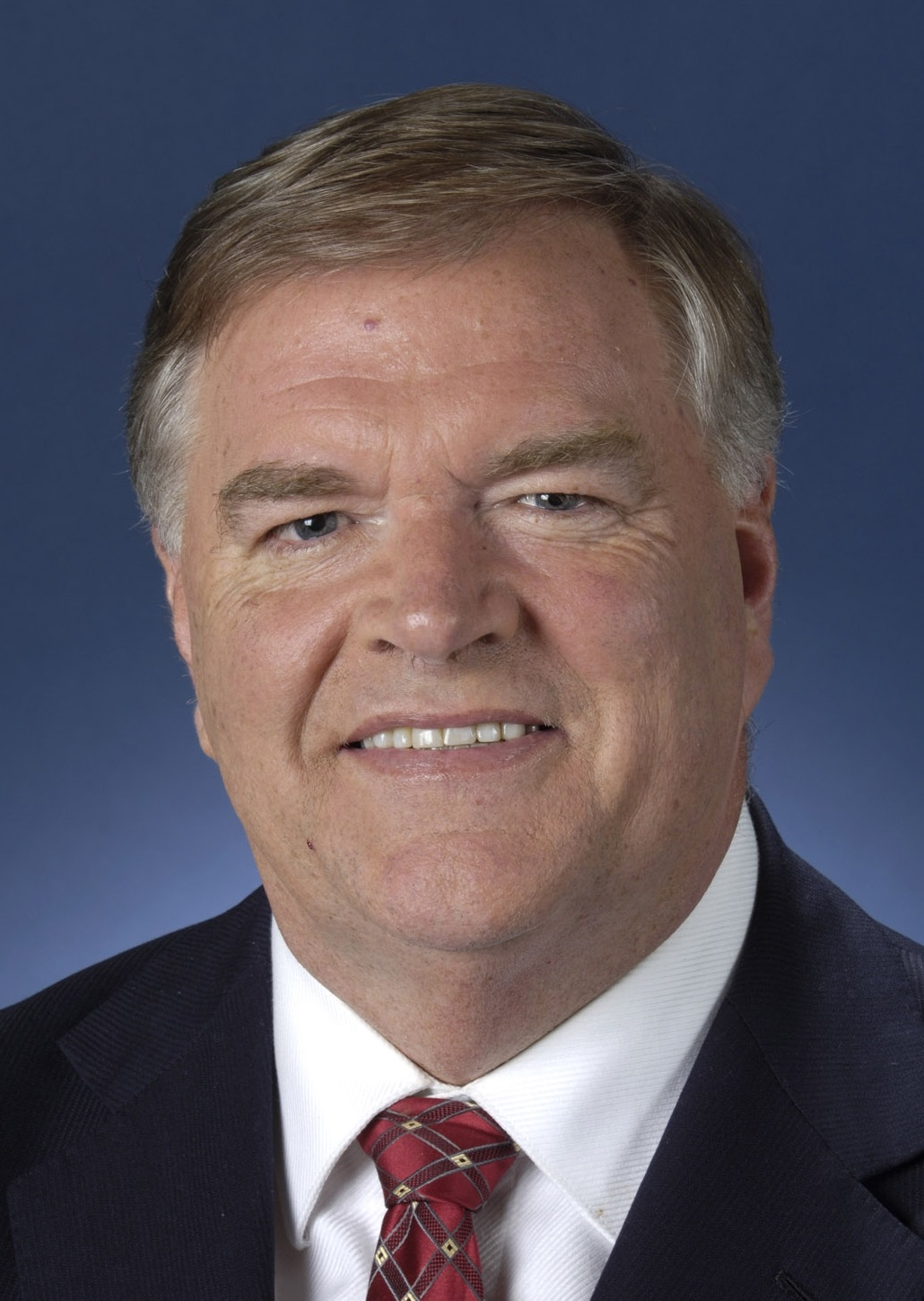
	First party	Second party
Leader	John Howard	Kim Beazley
Party	Liberal/National coalition	Labor
Last election	8 seats	3 seats
Seats won	7	7
Seat change	▼1	▲4
Popular vote	411,432	377,545
Percentage	39.5%	36.2%
Swing	▼5.9	▲1.5
TPP	50.54%	49.46%
TPP swing	▼5.46	▲5.46

Turnout 94.7% (CV) — Informal 4.2%
Party	Votes	%	Swing	Seats	Change
Liberal	397,836	38.15	-5.87	7	▼1
National	13,596	1.30	-0.03		Steady
Liberal/National Coalition	411,432	39.46	-5.90	7	▼1
Labor	377,545	36.21	1.48	7	▲4
One Nation	96,708	9.27	9.27		
Greens	52,674	5.05	-0.26		
Democrats	41,364	3.97	-1.61		
Independents	31,980	3.07	-5.71		▼3
Australia First	18,828	1.81	1.81		
Christian Democrats	8,336	0.80	0.80		
Citizens Electoral Council	1,541	0.15	0.15		
Natural Law	951	0.09	-0.16		
Democratic Socialist	682	0.07	0.07		
Abolish Child Support	413	0.04	0.04		
Unity	321	0.03	0.03		
Total	1,042,775			14	
Two-party-preferred vote
Liberal/National Coalition	527,042	50.54	-5.46	7	▼1
Labor	515,733	49.46	+5.46	7	▲4
Invalid/blank votes	45,509	4.18	+1.02		
Turnout	1,088,284	94.66			
Registered voters	1,149,619				
Source: Federal Elections 1998

=== South Australia ===
1998 Australian federal election (South Australia)
- 3 October 1998

All 12 South Australian seats in the Australian House of Representatives and 6 seats in the Australian Senate
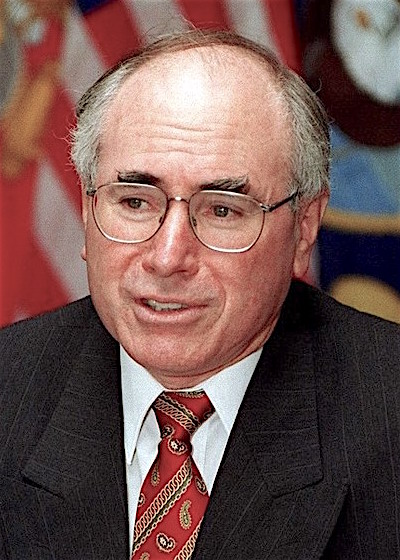

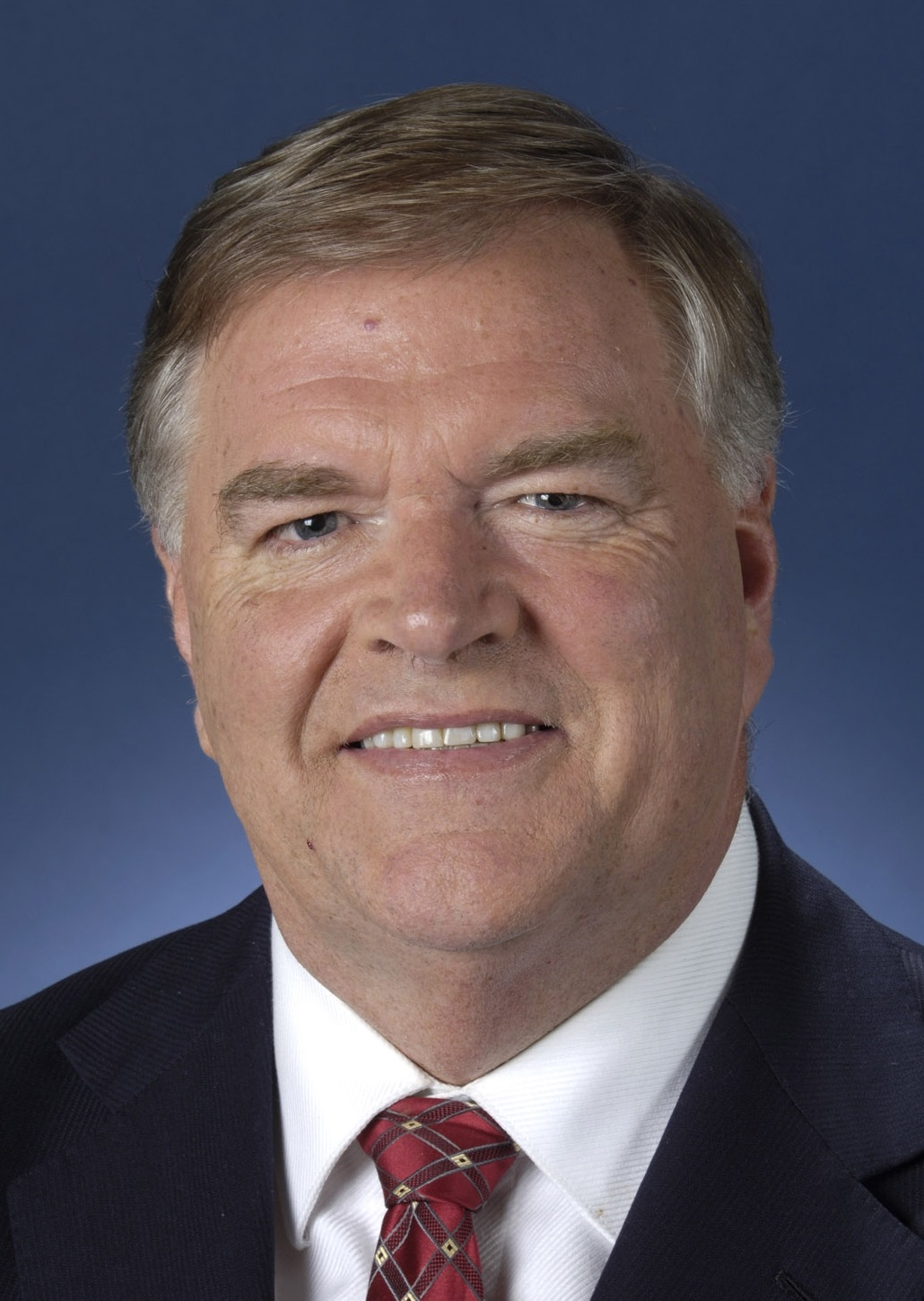
	First party	Second party
Leader	John Howard	Kim Beazley
Party	Liberal/National coalition	Labor
Last election	10 seats	2 seats
Seats won	9 seats	3 seats
Seat change	▼1	▲1
Popular vote	394,178	319,267
Percentage	42.6%	34.5%
Swing	▼7.4	▼0.4
TPP	53.11%	46.89%
TPP swing	▼4.15	▲4.15

Turnout 95.6% (CV) — Informal 3.5%
Party	Votes	%	Swing	Seats	Change
Liberal	389,382	42.05	-7.94	9	▼1
National	4,796	0.52	0.52		Steady
Liberal/National Coalition	394,178	42.57	-7.42	9	▼1
Labor	319,267	34.48	-0.35	3	▲1
Democrats	93,905	10.14	-0.06		
One Nation	90,773	9.80	0.00		
Independent	13,327	1.44	0.39		
Greens	4,576	0.49	-2.46		
Natural Law	3,526	0.38	-0.11		
Christian Democrats	3,521	0.38	0.00		
Australia First	1,604	0.17	0.00		
Communist	801	0.09	0.00		
Independent EFF	513	0.06	0.00		
Total	925,991			12	
Two-party-preferred vote
Liberal/National Coalition	491,802	53.11	-4.15	9	▼1
Labor	434,189	46.89	4.15	3	▲1
Invalid/blank votes	44,074	4.54	0.46		
Turnout	970,065	96.91			
Registered voters	1,001,006				
Source: Federal Elections 1998

=== Tasmania ===
1998 Australian federal election (Tasmania)
- 3 October 1998

All 5 Tasmanian seats in the Australian House of Representatives and 6 seats in the Australian Senate
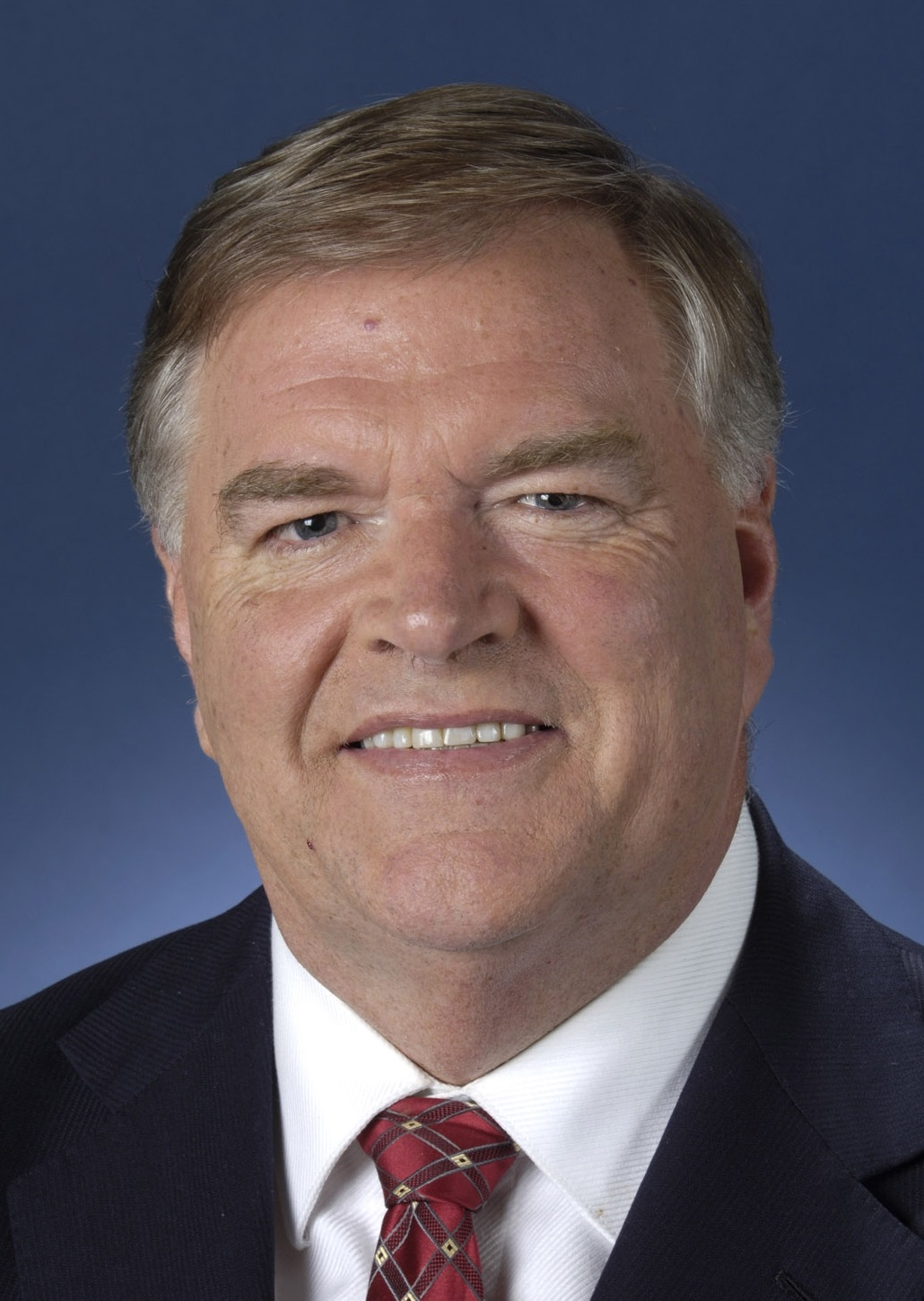

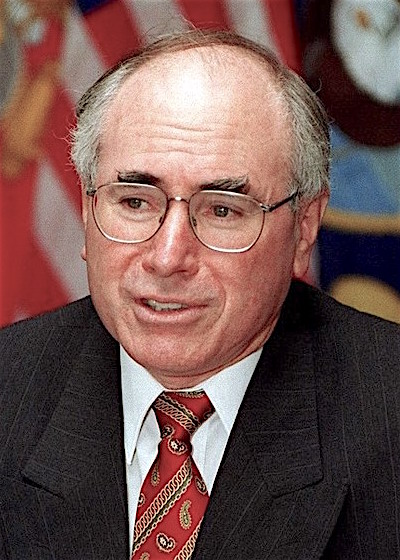
	First party	Second party
Leader	Kim Beazley	John Howard
Party	Labor	Coalition
Last election	3 seats	2 seats
Seats won	5 seats	0 seats
Seat change	▲2	▼2
Popular vote	150,384	117,377
Percentage	48.9%	38.2%
Swing	▲4.6	▼6.3
TPP	57.32%	42.68%
TPP swing	▲5.74	▼5.74

Turnout 95.6% (CV) — Informal 3.5%
Party	Votes	%	Swing	Seats	Change
Labor	150,384	48.91	4.60	5	▲2
Liberal	117,377	38.17	-6.29		▼2
Greens	17,091	5.56	-0.78		
Democrats	10,024	3.26	-0.83		
One Nation	7,553	2.46	0.00		
Tasmania First	4,551	1.48	0.00		
Total	307,477			5	
Two-party-preferred vote
Labor	176,241	57.32	5.74	5	▲2
Liberal	131,236	42.68	-5.74	0	▼2
Invalid/blank votes	9,819	3.09	0.74		
Turnout	317,296	96.12			
Registered voters	330,121				
Source: Federal Elections 1998

== Territories ==
=== Australian Capital Territory ===
1998 Australian federal election (Australian Capital Territory)
- 3 October 1998

Both Australian Capital Territory seats in the Australian House of Representatives and both seats in the Australian Senate
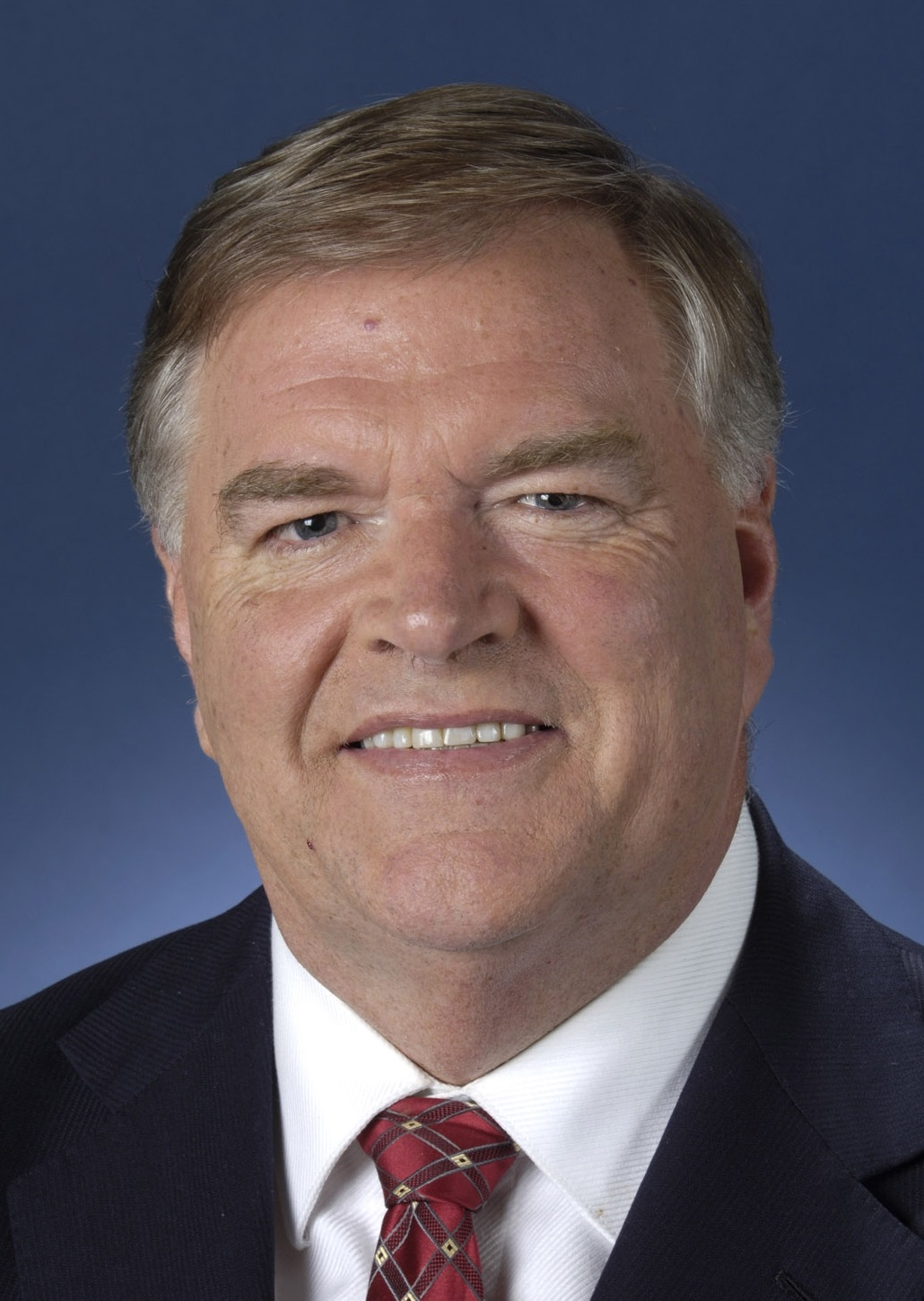

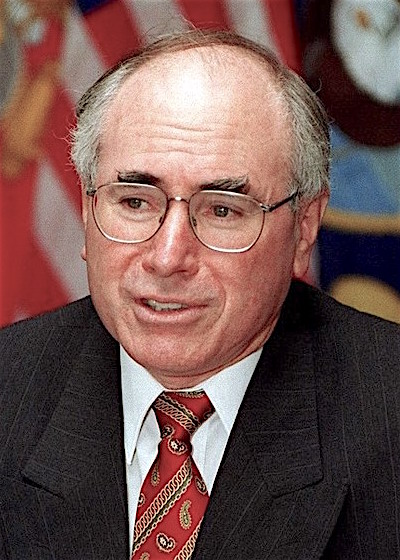
	First party	Second party
Leader	Kim Beazley	John Howard
Party	Labor	Coalition
Last election	3 seats	0 seats
Seats won	2 seats	0 seats
Seat change	▼1	Steady
Popular vote	98,588	59,424
Percentage	50.64%	30.52%
Swing	▲2.73	▼10.40
TPP	62.4%	37.6%
TPP swing	▲7.0	▼7.0

Turnout 95.7% (CV) — Informal 2.9%
Party	Votes	%	Swing	Seats	Change
Labor	98,588	50.64	+2.73	2	▼1
Liberal	59,424	30.52	–10.40		Steady
Democrats	14,394	7.39			
One Nation	9,895	5.08			
Greens	8,145	4.18	–4.52		
Democratic Socialist	2,641	1.36			
Natural Law	539	0.28	–0.13		
Independents	1,057	0.54	–1.52		
Total	194,683			2	▼1
Two-party-preferred vote
Labor	121,552	62.4	+7.0	2	▼1
Liberal	73,131	37.6	–7.0	0	Steady
Invalid/blank votes	5,743	2.87	+0.05		
Turnout	200,426	95.65			
Registered voters	209,536				
Source: Federal Elections 1998

=== Northern Territory ===
1998 Australian federal election (Northern Territory)
- 3 October 1998

The one Northern Territory seat in the Australian House of Representatives and both seats in the Australian Senate
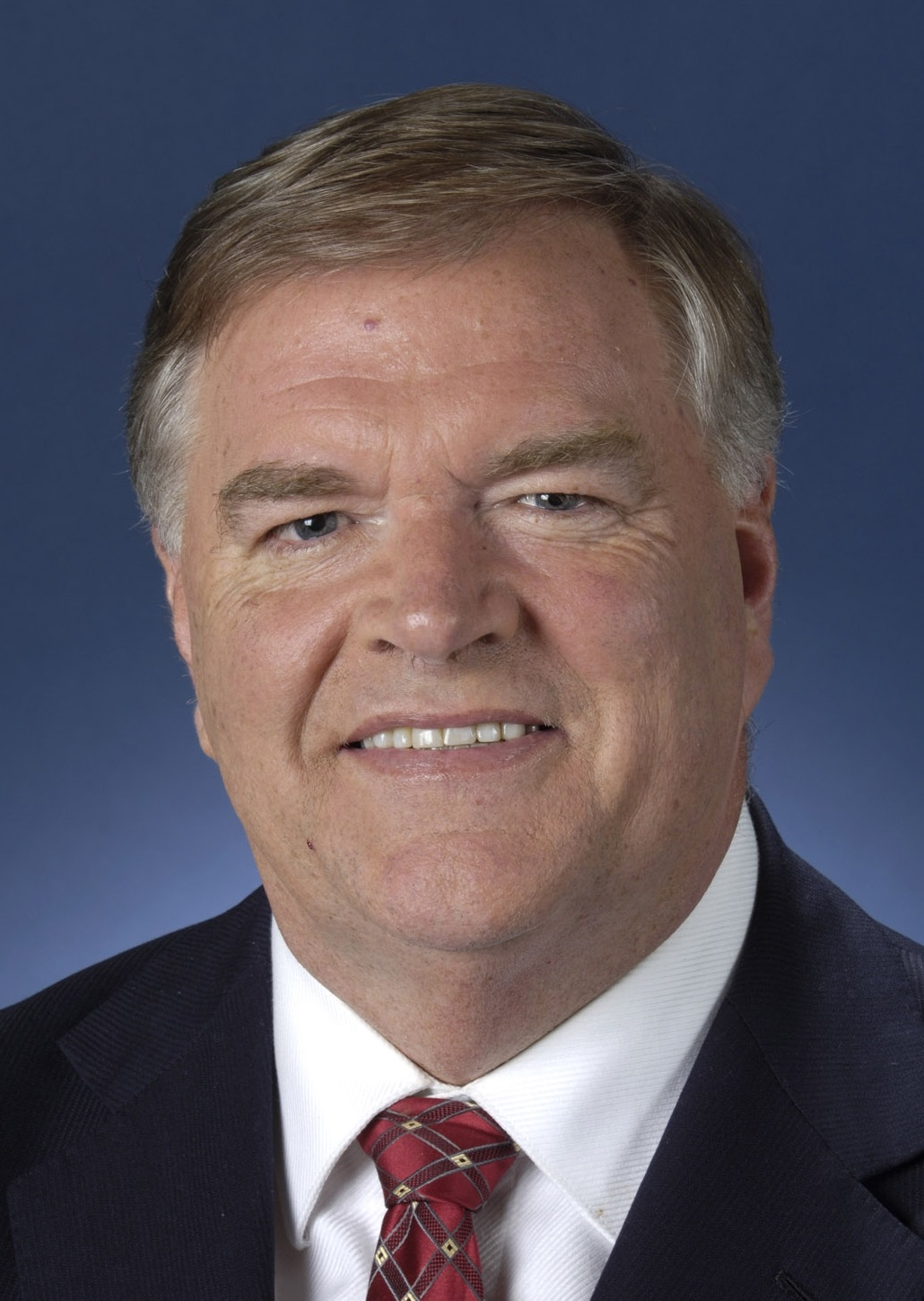

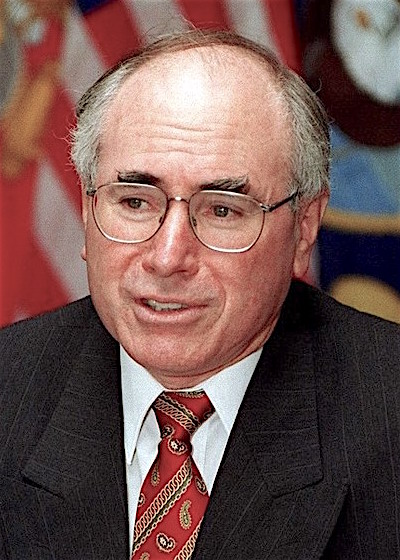
	First party	Second party
Leader	Kim Beazley	John Howard
Party	Labor	Coalition
Last election	0 seats	1 seat
Seats won	1	0
Seat change	▲1	▼1
Popular vote	38,469	36,014
Percentage	42.30%	39.60%
Swing	▼1.20	▼5.44
TPP	50.6%	49.4%
TPP swing	▲0.90	▼0.90

1998 Australian federal election: Northern Territory
Party	Candidate	Votes	%	±%
Labor	Warren Snowdon	38,469	42.30	−1.20
Country Liberal	Nick Dondas	36,014	39.60	−5.44
One Nation	Peter Schirmer	7,401	8.14	+8.14
Democrats	Craig Seiler	4,658	5.12	+5.12
Greens	Ilana Eldridge	2,753	3.03	−3.23
Independent	Barry Nattrass	1,018	1.12	+1.12
Democratic Socialist	Natalie Zirngast	624	0.69	+0.69
Total formal votes		90,937	95.84	−0.77
Informal votes		3,951	4.16	+0.77
Turnout		94,888	90.33	+1.23
Two-party-preferred result
Labor	Warren Snowdon	45,986	50.57	+0.94
Country Liberal	Nick Dondas	44,951	49.43	−0.94
Labor gain from Country Liberal		Swing	+0.94	

== See also ==
- Results of the 1998 Australian federal election (Senate)
- Members of the Australian House of Representatives, 1998–2001
