= Communist Party of Australia (1971) =

Far-left political party in Australia

Communist Party of Australia Socialist Party of Australia (1971–1996)
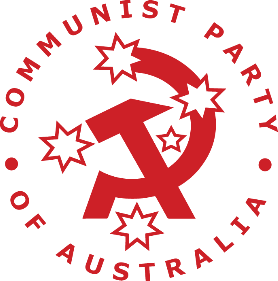
- Abbreviation: CPA
- General Secretary: Andrew Irving
- President: Vinicio Molina
- Founder: Pat Clancy; Peter Symon
- Founded: 5 December 1971; 54 years ago (Note: Originally founded in 1971 as the Socialist Party of Australia, it held its founding congress in September of the following year, and has been known as the Communist Party of Australia since 1996.)
- Split from: Communist Party of Australia (1920–1991)
- Headquarters: Marrickville, New South Wales (Note: The party moved its headquarters in July 2026. "We're moving!". The Guardian. Communist Party of Australia. 13 July 2026.)
- Newspaper: Guardian: The Workers' Weekly
- Ideology: Communism; Marxism–Leninism
- Political position: Far-left
- International affiliation: IMCWP
- Electoral bloc: Communist Alliance (2009–2011)
- Colors: Red
- Anthem: "The Internationale"
- House of Representatives: 0 / 150
- Senate: 0 / 76
- Local government: 0 / 562

Party flag
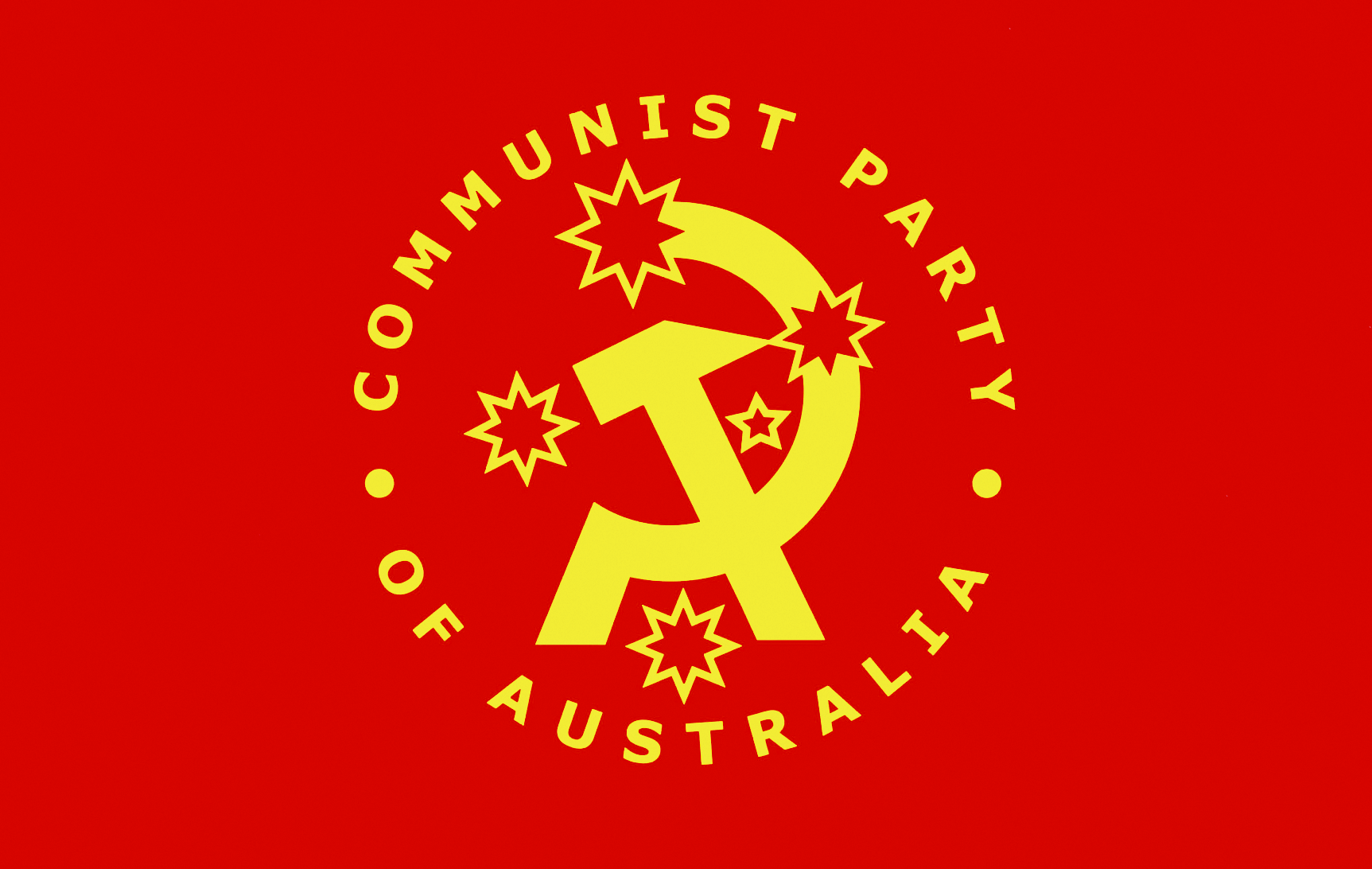

Website
- cpa.org.au

The Communist Party of Australia (CPA) is a Marxist-Leninist party in Australia. It was founded in 1971 as the Socialist Party of Australia (SPA) and adopted its current name in 1996. The party was established by former members of the original Communist Party of Australia opposed to the political direction taken under National Secretary Laurie Aarons. The CPA considers itself to be a continuation of the original party founded in 1920, and identifies itself as Marxist-Leninist.

== History ==
=== Origins and split in the original CPA (1965-1970) ===
Following the retirement of long-time General Secretary Lance Sharkey, Laurie Aarons was elected to lead the CPA. The election of Aarons produced a significant change in policies and practices in the party in the late 1960s and early 1970s. In this period, the party was increasingly divided over its relationship with the Communist Party of the Soviet Union, its industrial strategy and its engagement with the New Left. In 1968, the Party's national executive penned an article in Tribune, the party newspaper, criticising the recent Warsaw Pact invasion of Czechoslovakia.

In 1969, at an international conference of communist parties in Moscow, Laurie Aarons, representing the CPA, criticised the Soviet invasion of Czechoslovakia to crush the Prague Spring, and refused to endorse the final conference resolution. Internal divisions grew, with party members opposed to the new line increasingly refusing to accept decisions of the national executive, organising publications critical of the policies and holding discussions in anticipation of the next party congress. At a 1969 National Committee meeting held to prepare documents for the upcoming 22nd congress, prominent opposition figure Edgar Ross criticised the documents for omitting the word "communist" and for describing the 'left wing' of the Australian Labor Party as being on equal footing as other left-wing groups.

The internal conflict came to a head at the 22nd CPA Party Congress in 1970, where several leading dissidents, including Bill Brown, were not returned to the National Committee, while Pat Clancy lost his position on the National Executive, the smaller executive body operating under the National Committee.

=== Socialist Party (1970–1996) ===
In September 1970, a declaration was signed by over 300 CPA members including this summary of the main issues, as understood by the dissenting group:

We believe one basic reason for the decline and confusion in the Party during the short period since the present leadership has taken office arises fundamentally from its vacillating, opportunist position and is the direct result of its substitution of a mixture of right opportunist and so-called New Left or petty bourgeois radical trends in place of its formerly sound scientific socialist position.

The culmination of these events was the formation of the SPA, a party composed of Marxist-Leninists who had left the CPA in December 1971. The SPA regarded itself as continuing the Marxist-Leninist traditions and policies of the original CPA, in opposition to the direction taken by the Aarons leadership.

The SPA was led by a group of veteran trade union officials such as Pat Clancy and Peter Symon. Clancy resigned from the SPA in 1983, and Symon was the general secretary from its formation until his death in December 2008, a total of 36 years.

=== Communist Party (1996–present) ===
The old CPA was dissolved in 1991. The SPA, believing itself to be the rightful successor to the original CPA formed in 1920, changed its name to Communist Party of Australia at its 8th Party National Congress in October 1996.

After Symon's death, party president Hannah Middleton was elected general secretary by the 11th Party National Congress in October 2009, with Vinicio Molina succeeding Middleton as party president. Bob Briton was elected general secretary at the 12th Party Congress in 2013.

In March 2019, general secretary Bob Briton resigned amid an internal dispute with the other members of the Central Committee. Briton and several other former members subsequently established a separate organisation called the Australian Communist Party.

On 13–14 April 2019, the Central Committee of the Communist Party of Australia elected a new leadership led by General Secretary Andrew Irving, with Vinicio Molina re-elected as president.

From 2019, the party established new branches in Canberra, the Sunshine Coast and Cumberland in western Sydney.

At its 15th National Congress, held in Melbourne from 27 February to 1 March 2026, the party adopted a new Political Resolution, elected a new Central Committee and re-elected Andrew Irving and Vinicio Molina as General Secretary and National President respectively.

== Ideology and policies ==
The CPA describes itself as a "political organisation established for the purpose of changing the order of society in Australia from capitalism to socialism". The party's program describes the CPA as a working class party, whose activities are based on Marxism-Leninism, and regards itself as the continuation of the same party as the original CPA founded in 1920.

The highest body of the party is the Party Congress, which ordinarily meets every four years, and between congresses is led by the Central Committee. The party publishes the weekly Guardian: The Workers' Weekly and the theoretical journal Australian Marxist Review.

The party maintains friendly relations with communist and socialist parties overseas and is a participant in the International Meeting of Communist and Workers' Parties (IMCWP).

The most recent CPA Political Resolution, passed at the party's 15th congress in 2026 supports a planned economy, land rights and self-determination for Aboriginal Australians, state-built public housing, a strong and politically independent labour movement, a just transition away from fossil fuels and an end to 'green imperialism', free, universal and secular education among other policies. The party emphasises grassroots community organising and solidarity with community organisations. It states that parliamentary and electoral activity are important only when combined with mass struggle, and that socialism cannot be achieved through elections and gradual reform alone.

On foreign policy, the resolution describes Australia as a 'middle imperialist power' and opposes military installations from the United States of America on Australian soil and the AUKUS agreement. The party advocates a strong and independent Palestinian state with the right to form a defence force, calls for an end to the Gaza genocide and advocates for equal rights across all of historical Palestine and opposes Israeli apartheid.

== Elections ==
Michael Perth contested the seat of Port Adelaide in the 1998 and in the 2001 federal elections, but polled less than 1% of the vote in both cases. Bob Briton contested the SA state seat of Lee in 2010 and polled 2.9% of the votes.

At the 2010 federal election the party endorsed a candidate for the House of Representatives seat of Sydney as part of the Communist Alliance. The party received 0.83% or 656 of the 79,377 votes cast. It also endorsed two candidates for the Senate in New South Wales, receiving 0.17% or 7,000 of the 4.3 million votes cast. The Australian Electoral Commission deregistered Communist Alliance successor name The Communists on 22 May 2012 due to the party failing to prove it had 500 members.

The Communist Party of Australia received its first electoral win with the election of Tony Oldfield in local government elections on 8 September 2012 to Auburn City Council, New South Wales.

The Communist Party of Australia planned to run candidates in the 2016 federal election, but their registration was rejected by the Australian Electoral Commission. In 2017 the party attempted to register under the name "The Communists", but they were again rejected due to the party failing to prove it had at least 500 members.

=== Federal ===
House of Representatives
Year	Votes	%	±	Seat(s)	±
1998	801	0.00	—	0/148	Steady
2001	672	0.00	—	0/150	Steady
2004	did not contest				Steady
2007	did not contest				Steady
2010	656 (Note: Ran under the Communist Alliance electoral alliance banner.)	0.01	▲0.01%	0/150	Steady
2013	Unregistered				Steady
2016	Unregistered				Steady
2019	Unregistered				Steady
2022	Unregistered				Steady

Senate
Year	Votes	%	±	Seat(s)	±
1998	did not contest				Steady
2001	did not contest				Steady
2004	did not contest				Steady
2007	did not contest				Steady
2010	6,999	0.06	▲0.06%	0/76	Steady
2013	Unregistered				Steady
2016	Unregistered				Steady
2019	Unregistered				Steady
2022	Unregistered				Steady
