= Valery Ivanov =

Soviet diplomat

Valery Nikolayevich Ivanov (Russian: Валерий Николаевич Иванов) (born 1948) was a Soviet diplomat.

As First Secretary of the Soviet Embassy to Australia, he was expelled on 22 April 1983 under suspicion of being a spy after allegedly trying to recruit Australian Labor Party member David Combe, see Combe-Ivanov affair.
