= Rod Sawford =

Australian politician

Member of the Australian Parliament for Port Adelaide
- In office 26 March 1988 – 17 October 2007
- Preceded by: Mick Young
- Succeeded by: Mark Butler

Personal details
- Born: 26 June 1944 (age 81) Adelaide, South Australia
- Party: Australian Labor Party
- Occupation: Teacher

Rodney Weston Sawford (born 26 June 1944), is a former Australian Labor Party politician. He served as the member of the Australian House of Representatives from March 1988 to November 2007, representing the Division of Port Adelaide, South Australia.

== Biography ==
He was born in Adelaide, South Australia, and was educated at Western Teachers College, Adelaide. He was a teacher before entering politics, serving as the principal of the local Taperoo Primary School.

He was elected to parliament at the 1988 Port Adelaide by-election, following the resignation of Mick Young. He prided himself on the fact that he and his forebears have lived in the electorate for many generations.

He was a member of the previously dominant Centre-Left faction, which is now defunct, and is now classified as a member of the "independents" faction.

He spoke out against Kim Beazley when he attempted to regain the leadership from then leader Simon Crean in 2003, again when Beazley contested the leadership with Mark Latham in December 2003, and again in 2005, when Beazley reassumed the leadership following Latham's retirement.

His electorate office was burnt down in an overnight fire in 2004.

Sawford was a Deputy Government Whip 1994–96 and a Deputy Opposition Whip 1996–2001.

He announced his retirement as of the 2007 federal election, citing an interest in running as a state independent as a protest against "gutless wonders" in the Rann state Labor government over long-running housing development plans at Cheltenham.

Parliament of Australia
Preceded by Mick Young	Member for Port Adelaide; 1988–2007	Succeeded by Mark Butler
