= Albert Thompson (Australian politician) =

Australian politician

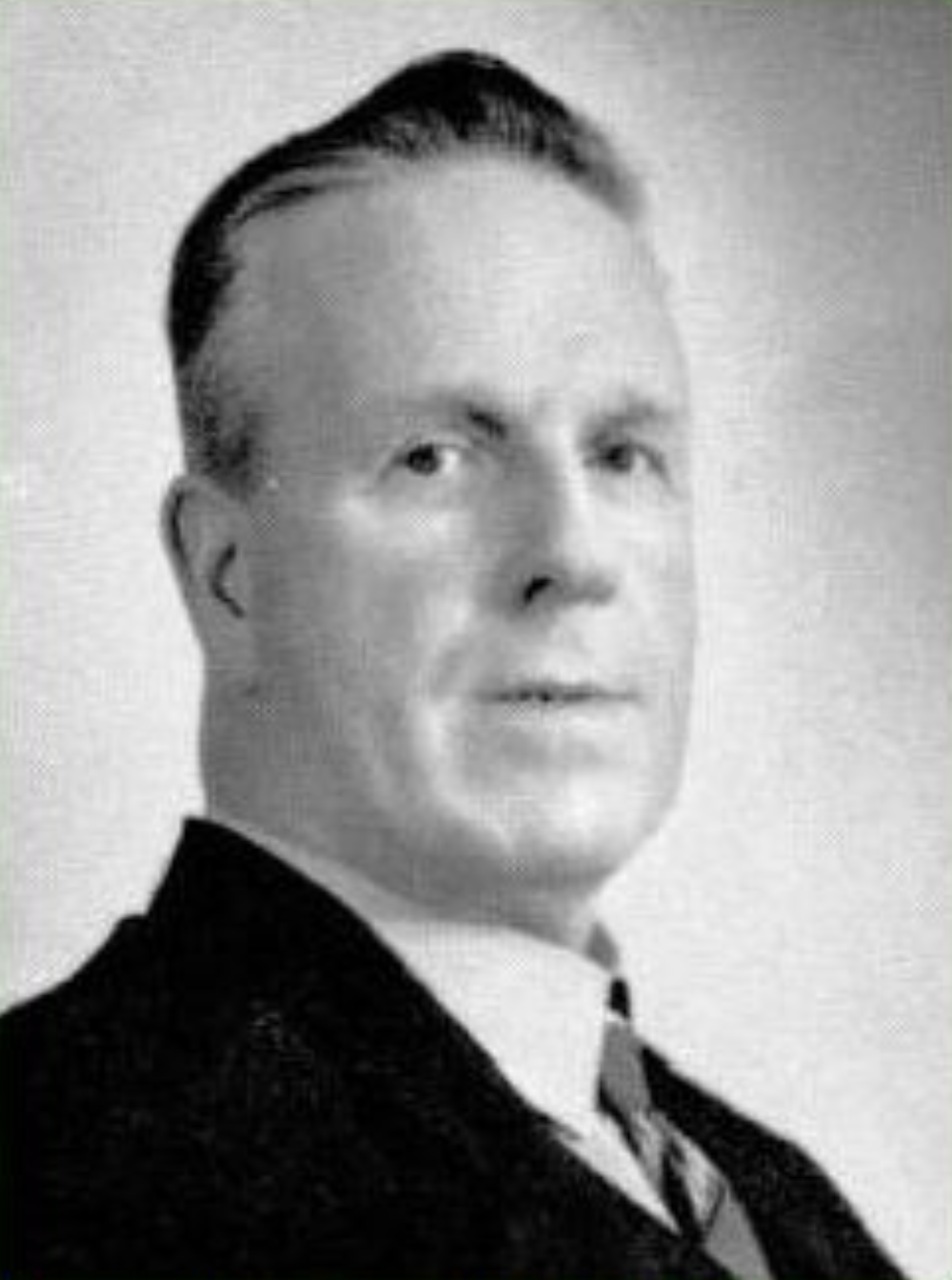

Member of the Australian Parliament for Hindmarsh
- In office 28 September 1946 – 10 December 1949
- Preceded by: Norman Makin
- Succeeded by: Clyde Cameron

Member of the Australian Parliament for Port Adelaide
- In office 10 December 1949 – 1 November 1963
- Preceded by: New seat
- Succeeded by: Fred Birrell

Personal details
- Born: 14 November 1886 Rosewater, South Australia
- Died: 13 January 1966 (aged 79)
- Party: Labor Party
- Spouse: Millicent Maud Garnaut
- Occupation: Farmer

Albert Victor Thompson (14 November 1886 – 13 January 1966) was a member of the Australian House of Representatives and the South Australian House of Assembly.

Born at Yatala (now Rosewater) near Port Adelaide, South Australia, Thompson was the sixth child of Joseph Thompson and Jane Ann Batey, both of Northumberland, England. Thompson married Millicent Maud Garnaut on 19 January 1909 and initially farmed near Keith in southeast South Australia before a drought in 1914 led to their return to Port Adelaide.

In 1930 Thompson was elected President of the Carters and Drivers Union, (later the Transport Workers Union). His influence in the union movement led to his preselection as the Labor Party candidate for the safe Labor seat of Port Adelaide at the 1930 South Australian election. After the institution of single-member electorates in the South Australian House of Assembly in 1938, Thompson successfully transferred to Semaphore, serving there until 1946. He also served as president of the South Australian branch of the ALP from 1938 to 1940.

In 1946 Thompson resigned from state parliament to successfully run as the Labor candidate for the federal seat of Hindmarsh, based on Port Adelaide, in the House of Representatives. After most of the northern portion of Hindmarsh was transferred to the new seat of Port Adelaide ahead of the 1949 election, Thompson transferred there and won easily. Thompson retired from politics at the 1963 election.

Parliament of Australia
Preceded by Norman Makin	Member for Hindmarsh; 1946–1949	Succeeded by Clyde Cameron
New division	Member for Port Adelaide; 1949–1963	Succeeded by Fred Birrell
