= Peter Symon =

Australian politician (1922–2008)

Peter Dudley Symon (13 August 1922 – 18 December 2008) was the General Secretary of the Socialist Party of Australia (since 1996, the Communist Party of Australia) from 1971 to 2008.

Symon was a member of the Central Committee of the original Communist Party of Australia (formed in 1920, disbanded in 1991). He joined at the age of 16, and was one of the hundreds who either resigned or were expelled from the party in 1971. He was a foundation member of the newly created Socialist Party of Australia (SPA) formed in December that year, and was elected General Secretary at its first Congress.

In the Second World War, Symon served in the army, then the air force, and in later life worked as a waterside labourer in Adelaide.

The SPA changed its name to the Communist Party of Australia at its 1996 Congress. Symon's position as General Secretary was reconfirmed after the Party's 10th Congress in 2005.

Party political offices
Preceded by none	General Secretary of the Socialist Party of Australia; 1971–1996	Succeeded by Himself as General Secretary of the Communist Party of Australia
Preceded by Himself as General Secretary of the Socialist Party of Australia	General Secretary of the Communist Party of Australia; 1996–2008	Succeeded by Hannah Middleton
