= Fred Birrell =

Australian politician (1913–1985)

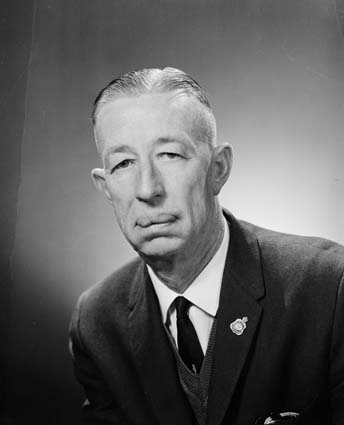

Member of the Australian Parliament for Port Adelaide
- In office 30 November 1963 – 11 April 1974
- Preceded by: Albert Thompson
- Succeeded by: Mick Young

Personal details
- Born: 7 December 1913 Adelaide, South Australia
- Died: 23 July 1985 (aged 71)
- Party: Australian Labor Party
- Occupation: Auto worker, unionist

Frederick Ronald Birrell (7 December 1913 – 23 July 1985) was an Australian politician.

== History ==
Born in Adelaide, South Australia, grandson of Robert Birrell (died 1880) and son of Frederick (c. 1877 – 31 July 1952) and May Birrell (née Moran), he was educated at state schools before becoming an auto worker. He served in the military from 1940 to 1946. From 1959 to 1963 he was the South Australian Secretary of the Vehicle Builders' Union, becoming its federal president 1961–1962. In 1958 he was president of the South Australian Trades and Labor Council. In 1963, he was elected to the Australian House of Representatives as the Labor member for Port Adelaide. He held the seat until his retirement in 1974. Birrell died in 1985.

== Personal ==
Fred Birrell married Patricia Lundie, a daughter of Francis Walter Lundie, long time leader of the Amalgamated Shearers' Union, then the Australian Workers' Union, Councillor for the Corporation of the City of Adelaide and the Port Adelaide Council, board member of the Royal Adelaide Hospital and the Royal Zoological Society of South Australia. He was a member of the 1934 Glenelg Tiger (SANFL) football premiership team.

Family relationship to Frederick William Birrell (1869–1939), South Australian typographer and MLA Son of Andrew Birrell, if any, has not been found.

Parliament of Australia
Preceded by Albert Thompson	Member for Port Adelaide; 1963 – 1974	Succeeded by Mick Young
