= Mick Young =

Australian politician (1936–1996)

The Honourable Mick Young
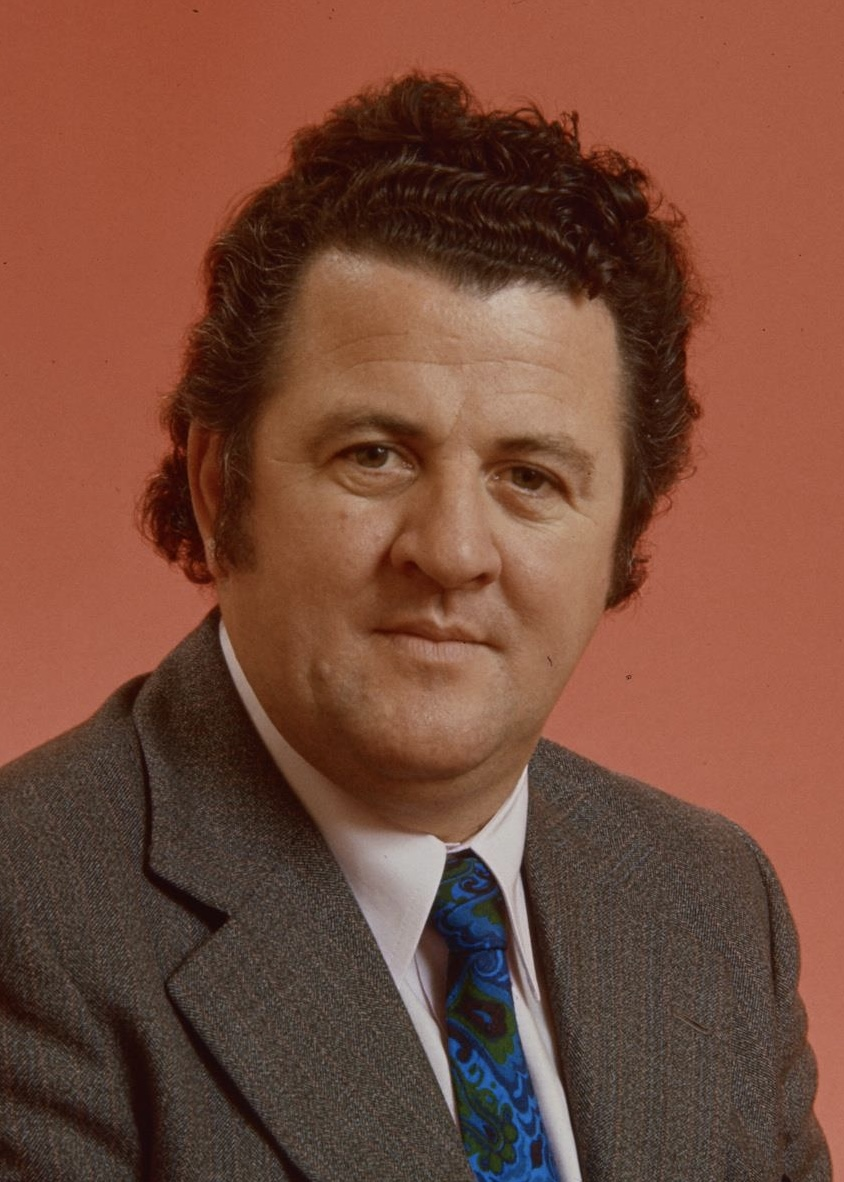
- Young in 1974

National President of the Labor Party
- In office 3 July 1986 – 7 April 1988
- Preceded by: Neville Wran
- Succeeded by: John Bannon

Leader of the House
- In office 21 January 1984 – 12 February 1988
- Prime Minister: Bob Hawke
- Preceded by: Lionel Bowen
- Succeeded by: Kim Beazley
- In office 11 March 1983 – 14 July 1983
- Prime Minister: Bob Hawke
- Preceded by: James Killen
- Succeeded by: Lionel Bowen

Manager of Opposition Business
- In office 29 December 1977 – 11 February 1980
- Leader: Bill Hayden
- Preceded by: Gordon Scholes
- Succeeded by: Chris Hurford

Member of Parliament for Port Adelaide
- In office 18 May 1974 – 12 February 1988
- Preceded by: Fred Birrell
- Succeeded by: Rod Sawford

National Secretary of the Australian Labor Party
- In office 2 April 1969 – 10 July 1973
- Preceded by: Cyril Windham
- Succeeded by: David Combe

Personal details
- Born: Michael Jerome Young; 9 October 1936 Sydney, New South Wales, Australia
- Died: 8 April 1996 (aged 59) Darlinghurst, New South Wales, Australia
- Party: Labor
- Spouse: Mary Young (née Dollard)
- Occupation: Shearer, unionist

Michael Jerome Young (9 October 1936 − 8 April 1996) was an Australian politician. He rose through the Australian Labor Party (ALP) to become its National Secretary, before serving as a Labor member of the House of Representatives from the 1974 election to 1988. He was a senior minister in the Hawke government, and was a prominent political figure during the 1970s and 1980s. Young was also President of the Australian Labor Party from 1986 to 1988.

== Early life ==
Young was born in Sydney on 9 October 1936. He was the sixth of eight children born to Kathleen Bridget (née Shanahan) and Ray Barnard Young. His father was a traveling salesman.

Young was educated at Marist Brothers Mosman. He left school at the age of 15 and began training as a wool classer, moving to western New South Wales. He later became a shearer and became involved with the labour movement in Broken Hill, at a time of frequent industrial conflict within the industry. Young was elected secretary of the Broken Hill Pastoral Workers' Committee at the age of 20. He attended the 6th World Festival of Youth and Students in Moscow in 1957, also visiting China in the same year.

In 1958, Young moved to Adelaide and began working as a paid organizer with the Australian Workers' Union. He soon came under the influence of Clyde Cameron, later working as an organizer in Port Pirie.

== Early political involvement ==
Young was appointed as the party's South Australian state organizer in 1964, and his role in the first Labor electoral win for 30 years at the 1965 state election (the election resulted in Frank Walsh becoming Labor Premier) led first to his election as Secretary of the state branch in 1968 and later secretary of the federal party in 1969. Gough Whitlam, then Opposition Leader, hired Young as an adviser during this period.

He again showed his substantial campaign management skills in the 1972 federal election, playing a significant role in the first ALP federal election win since 1946. He devised Labor's "It's Time" slogan, still considered one of the most effective vote-winning phrases in Australian history.

== Federal politics ==
Touted as a potential successor to Whitlam as Labor leader, Young gained preselection for the safe Labor seat of Port Adelaide and was comfortably elected to parliament at the 1974 election. Labor under Whitlam suffered its worst-ever electoral defeat in late 1975; Young was promoted to the shadow ministry in 1976, and was given the Immigration and Ethnic Affairs portfolios.

Young has been credited with keeping Labor's spirits up during its time in opposition from 1975 to 1983. A future party leader, Kim Beazley Jr., considered Young on a par with Paul Keating as the most effective baiter of Liberal politicians, although Young "was much funnier, but gentler as well". One of Young's attacks on the Liberals targeted Alexander Downer, who was seen as a wealthy snob by the ALP; Young said "His gatehouse is bigger than The Lodge" (the official home of the Australian Prime Minister).

Following the landslide ALP victory at the 1983 federal election, Young was initially appointed Special Minister of State (and Vice-President of the Executive Council until July 1983), but was forced to stand down in 1983 when he breached Cabinet security, as part of the Combe-Ivanov affair. This did not do him lasting political damage, though, and five months later he became Special Minister of State again. He was forced to step down again in 1984 when he neglected to declare at Customs a large stuffed Paddington Bear toy that was in his wife's suitcase. He resumed his place in Cabinet when he was cleared of wrongdoing by a judicial inquiry.

In February 1987 he was appointed Minister for Immigration and Ethnic Affairs. He was also made Leader of the House of Representatives. He became Minister for Immigration, Local Government and Ethnic Affairs in July 1987, when he also took on the position of vice-president of the Executive Council again. While immigration minister, he introduced the custom of conducting formal briefings for the press gallery, based on the idea that it was preferable to freely provide information to the media with your own spin than for the media to gain the information from other sources that put their own spin on it.

As a member of parliament, Young remained actively involved in social justice issues. In 1984, during a contentious national ALP conference where nuclear issues were under debate, he openly spoke out against uranium mining, and invited anti-uranium mining activists to use his office as a base. He also made available copies of the secret Fox Report on Ranger Uranium to anti-nuclear protesters and supported their campaign to have the City of Port Adelaide declared a Nuclear Free Zone. In addition he was active in supporting refugees and multiculturalism, and during his term as minister launched an inquiry on immigration policy aimed at reforming the system.

In 1987, Young faced controversy over his alleged handling of campaign donations during the 1987 election. He subsequently resigned from parliament on 12 February 1988, sparking the 1988 Port Adelaide by-election, though he was later cleared of any wrongdoing.

== Later life ==
Following his resignation from parliament, Young worked as a lobbyist, chaired the Federal Government Multicultural Advisory Council and completed a review for the ALP following the 1995 Queensland state election. He also continued to serve as guide to promising Labor politicians, including Beazley, who considered Young his best friend.

Young's premature death in Sydney, of leukaemia, on 8 April 1996, was felt greatly by the Labor Party and his state funeral was well attended. An annual scholarship was set up in his name to assist disadvantaged children and adults in furthering their education.

Political offices
New title	Special Minister of State; 1983	Succeeded by Kim Beazley
Preceded by James Killen	Vice-President of the Executive Council; 1983	Succeeded by Lionel Bowen
Preceded by Kim Beazley	Special Minister of State; 1984–1987	Succeeded by Michael Tate
Preceded by Chris Hurford	Minister for Immigration, Local; Government and Ethnic Affairs; 1987–1988	Succeeded by Clyde Holding
Preceded by Lionel Bowen	Vice-President of the Executive Council; 1987–1988	Succeeded by Kim Beazley
Parliament of Australia
Preceded by Fred Birrell	Member for Port Adelaide; 1974–1988	Succeeded by Rod Sawford
Party political offices
Preceded by Cyril Wyndham	National Secretary of the Australian Labor Party; 1969–1972	Succeeded by David Combe
