= 1988 Port Adelaide by-election =

- 26 April 1988

Division of Port Adelaide (SA) in the House of Representatives

| | First party | Second party |
|---|---|---|
| Candidate | Rod Sawford | Judy Fuller |
| Party | Labor | Liberal |
| Primary vote | 29,773 | 23,818 |
| Percentage | 47.1% | 37.7% |
| Swing | ▼14.2 | ▲9.1 |
| TPP | 55.2% | 44.8% |
| TPP swing | ▼11.1 | ▲11.1 |
MP before election
Mick Young
Labor
Elected MP
Rod Sawford
Labor

A by-election was held for the Australian House of Representatives seat of Port Adelaide on 26 March 1988. This was triggered by the resignation of Labor Party MP Mick Young over alleged mishandling of campaign donations.

The election was won by Labor candidate Rod Sawford, despite an 11.1% swing to the Liberal Party.

The 1988 Adelaide by-election had occurred seven weeks earlier.

== Candidates ==
- Independent – Tony Chaplin.
- Independent – Michael Brander, representing the unregistered National Action.
- Liberal Party of Australia – Judy Fuller.
- Australian Labor Party – Rod Sawford, a local teacher.
- Independent – Bruce Deering.
- Australian Democrats – Meg Lees, previously Democrats candidate for Barker in 1983 and 1984 and third South Australian Senate candidate in 1987. Lees was appointed to the Senate in 1990 after Janine Haines's resignation, and later became leader of the Democrats before leaving the party in 2003 to form the Australian Progressive Alliance.
- Independent – Ruby Hammond, indigenous rights campaigner. Hammond was the first indigenous person to seek election to the federal parliament in South Australia.
- Independent – Jocelyn Aver.

== Results ==
Port Adelaide by-election, 1988
| Party | Candidate | Votes | % | ±% |
|---|---|---|---|---|
| Labor | Rod Sawford | 29,773 | 47.1 | −14.2 |
| Liberal | Judy Fuller | 23,818 | 37.7 | +9.1 |
| Democrats | Meg Lees | 4,506 | 7.1 | +1.0 |
| Independent | Tony Chaplin | 2,385 | 3.8 | +3.8 |
| Independent | Ruby Hammond | 1,142 | 1.8 | +1.8 |
| Independent | Jocelyn Aver | 743 | 1.2 | +1.2 |
| Independent | Michael Brander | 438 | 0.7 | +0.7 |
| Independent | Bruce Deering | 412 | 0.7 | +0.7 |
| Total formal votes | | 63,217 | 95.7 | |
| Informal votes | | 2,865 | 4.3 | |
| Turnout | | 66,082 | 91.1 | |
Two-party-preferred result
| Labor | Rod Sawford | 34,885 | 55.2 | −11.1 |
| Liberal | Judy Fuller | 28,276 | 44.8 | +11.1 |
| Labor hold | | Swing | −11.1 | |

== See also ==
- List of Australian federal by-elections
