= Division of Port Adelaide =

Former Australian federal electoral division

Coordinates: 34.777°S 138.546°E

Port Adelaide Australian House of Representatives Division
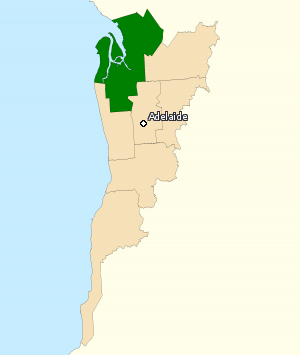
- Division of Port Adelaide in South Australia, as of the 2016 federal election
- Created: 1949
- Abolished: 2019
- Namesake: Port Adelaide
- Demographic: Inner metropolitan

The Division of Port Adelaide was an Australian electoral division in the state of South Australia. The 181 km^{2} seat extended from St Kilda in the north to Grange Road and Findon in the south with part of Salisbury to the east. Suburbs included Alberton, Beverley, Birkenhead, Cheltenham, Findon, Kilkenny, Largs Bay, Mansfield Park, North Haven, Ottoway, Parafield Gardens, Paralowie, Pennington, Port Adelaide, Queenstown, Rosewater, Salisbury Downs, Semaphore, Woodville, West Croydon, and part of Seaton. The seat also included Torrens Island and Garden Island. Port Adelaide was abolished in 2019, after a redistribution triggered by a change in representation entitlement which saw South Australia's seats in the House of Representatives reduced to ten.

== History ==
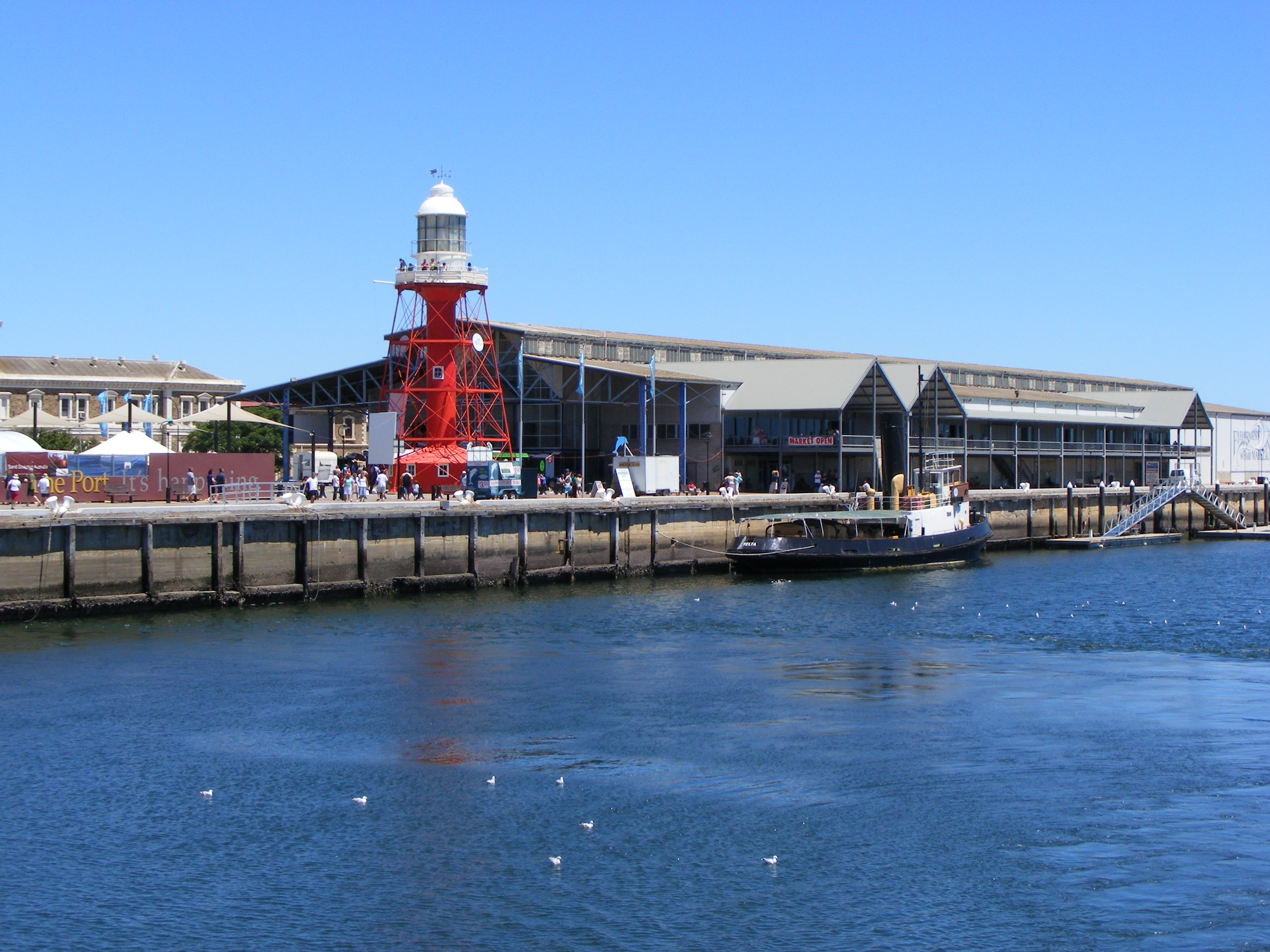
The region of Port Adelaide, the division's namesake

The seat was named after the suburb of Port Adelaide, the working port of Adelaide. Before 1949, most of the seat had been part of Hindmarsh, which moved south as a result of Port Adelaide's creation. The seat was proclaimed at the redistribution of 11 May 1949, and was first contested at the 1949 federal election. The newly created Port Adelaide division included Albert Park, Port Adelaide, Semaphore and Woodville subdivisions, and Kilburn which was part of the Prospect sub-division (west of Lower North road) from the old division of Adelaide.

For most of its history, it has been a comfortably safe Labor seat. The closest Labor has ever come to losing it was at the 1988 by-election, where Labor candidate Rod Sawford won on a 5.2 percent two-party margin. The two-party margin currently stands, after the 2016 vote, at 20.72 percent, making it the safest Labor seat in the state and one of the safest Labor seats in the nation. Port Adelaide remains the only electorate in South Australia to have voted Labor at every federal election in its existence.

The seat was pushed slightly northward in 2004 with the abolition of the other safe Labor seat in northern Adelaide, Bonython. A few southern portions of Bonython transferred to Port Adelaide, however the majority of Bonython was transferred to Wakefield which contributed to Wakefield's change from a rural safe Liberal seat to a hybrid urban-rural notional marginal Labor seat.

A notable curiosity in recent years was that in the 1998 and 2001 federal elections, the seat was the only one in Australia where a Communist Party candidate, Michael Perth, stood for election. This was the only occasion when the Liberal Party did not preference the One Nation Party last. He achieved about one percent of the vote on each occasion.

Sawford retired at the 2007 election, which saw South Australian Labor's historically safe seat easily won by the newly endorsed Labor candidate, unionist and former head of the Left state Labor faction Mark Butler.

At the 2016 election, as a result of the emergence of the Nick Xenophon Team, Butler became the first Labor candidate in 20 years, and only the second ever, to come up short of a majority on the primary vote. He easily won after preferences, with NXT pushing the Liberals into third place. While Port Adelaide remains the safest Labor seat in South Australia on two-party terms, Butler's primary vote was actually one percent lower than that of Amanda Rishworth in Kingston. Despite also falling short of a majority on the primary vote, Rishworth received the highest primary vote of South Australia's 11 seats, but remained the second safest Labor seat in South Australia on two-party terms. The presence of NXT candidates in all eleven state seats resulted in a suppressed major party primary vote.

Due to a change in representation entitlements for South Australia, the Redistribution Committee of the Australian Electoral Commission proposed that Port Adelaide be abolished as part of the 2018 boundary redistribution.

In July 2018, this recommendation was adopted, reducing the number of seats in South Australia to ten for the 2019 election. Most of Port Adelaide's electors will join Hindmarsh, which will change from marginal Labor to fairly safe Labor as a result. Smaller portions will transfer to Spence (formerly Wakefield), Adelaide and Makin. Ironically, most of the Port Adelaide area had been part of Hindmarsh for the first half-century after Federation. Butler transferred to Hindmarsh, while Hindmarsh's incumbent Labor MP, Steve Georganas, transferred to Adelaide.

== Members ==
Image	Member	Party	Term	Notes
	Albert Thompson (1886–1966)	Labor	10 December 1949 – 1 November 1963	Previously held the Division of Hindmarsh. Retired
	Fred Birrell (1913–1985)	Labor	30 November 1963 – 11 April 1974	Retired
	Mick Young (1936–1996)	Labor	18 May 1974 – 12 February 1988	Served as minister under Hawke. Resigned over alleged mishandling of campaign donations
	Rod Sawford (1944–)	Labor	26 March 1988 – 17 October 2007	Retired
	Mark Butler (1970–)	Labor	24 November 2007 – 11 April 2019	Served as minister under Rudd and Gillard. Transferred to the Division of Hindmarsh after Port Adelaide was abolished in 2019

== Election results ==
2016 Australian federal election: Port Adelaide
Party	Candidate	Votes	%	±%
Labor	Mark Butler	46,314	48.24	−2.34
Xenophon	Michael Slattery	17,970	18.72	+18.72
Liberal	Emma Flowerdew	17,884	18.63	−7.69
Greens	Matthew Carey	6,683	6.96	−1.65
Family First	Bruce Hambour	4,483	4.67	−2.85
Animal Justice	Janine Clipstone	2,078	2.16	+2.16
Christian Democrats	Jenalie Salt	597	0.62	+0.62
Total formal votes		96,009	94.19	+0.39
Informal votes		5,927	5.81	−0.39
Turnout		101,936	89.93	−2.24
Notional two-party-preferred count
Labor	Mark Butler	67,119	69.91	+5.89
Liberal	Emma Flowerdew	28,890	30.09	−5.89
Two-candidate-preferred result
Labor	Mark Butler	62,274	64.86	+0.84
Xenophon	Michael Slattery	33,735	35.14	+35.14
Labor hold		Swing	N/A	
