= John Scott =

John Scott may refer to:

== Academics ==
- John Scott (1639–1695), English clergyman and devotional writer
- John Witherspoon Scott (1800–1892), American minister, college president, and father of First Lady Caroline Harrison
- John Work Scott (1807–1879), American president of Washington College
- John Scott (medical school dean) (1851–1914), New Zealand professor, artist, and medical school dean
- John Scott (sociologist) (born 1949), British sociologist
- John R. Scott Sr. (1840/41–1929), president of Edward Waters College, minister of the African Methodist Episcopal Church, Florida legislator, father of John R. Scott Jr.
- John R. Scott Jr., president of Edward Waters College, minister of the African Methodist Episcopal Church, Florida legislator, son of John R. Scott Sr.
- John Paul Scott (geneticist) (1909–2000), American behavior geneticist and comparative psychologist

== Arts and entertainment ==
=== Art ===
- John Scott (1849–1919), English artist
- John Scott (Canadian artist) (1950–2022), Canadian multimedia painter, sculptor, and installation artist
- John Scott (engraver) (1774–1827), English engraver
- John Beldon Scott, American art historian
- John T. Scott (1940–2007), African-American sculptor, painter, printmaker, and collagist

=== Film and television ===
- John Stuart Scott (born 1966), American television director
- John Scott (Fringe), a character played by Mark Valley in the TV series Fringe
- John Scott Martin (1926–2009), English actor

=== Literature and journalism ===
- John Scott (editor) (1784–1821), editor of the London Magazine, killed in a duel in 1821
- John Scott (writer) (1912–1976), American journalist, editor for Time magazine
- John Scott of Amwell (1730–1783), Quaker poet and friend of Samuel Johnson
- John A. Scott (born 1948), Australian poet and novelist, now using the name John Scott
- John Alden Scott (1916–1996), American newspaper publisher, politician
- John Prindle Scott (1877–1932), American author, lecturer, educator and composer of art songs
- John Russell Scott (1879–1949), British publisher and media proprietor who created the Scott Trust to preserve The Guardian's financial and editorial independence

=== Music and dance ===
- John Scott, former name of Josie Scott, founder member of Australian band The Mark of Cain
- John Scott (choreographer), founder of the Irish Modern Dance Theatre, now John Scott Dance
- John Scott (composer) (born 1930), British film composer, conductor, musician, classical, jazz
- John Scott (organist) (1956–2015), English-born organist of St. Thomas's Church, New York City

== Politics and law ==
=== United States ===
- John Scott (sheriff), interim sheriff of Los Angeles County, California, US, from January 2014
- John M. Scott (1824–1898), chief justice of the Supreme Court of Illinois, US
- John Scott (Iowa politician) (1824–1903), lieutenant governor of Iowa
- John Scott (mayor), first mayor of Cumberland, Maryland, US
- John Scott (Missouri politician) (1785–1861), US representative from Missouri and delegate
- John G. Scott (1819–1892), US representative from Missouri
- John E. Scott (born 1939), Missouri state senator and president pro tem
- John P. Scott (1933–2010), New Jersey Senate member
- John Morin Scott (1730–1784), New York Continental congressman, general
- John Morin Scott (mayor) (1789–1858), mayor of Philadelphia, Pennsylvania
- John Scott (Ohio politician), Ohio House of Representatives
- John R. K. Scott (1873–1945), US representative from Pennsylvania
- John Scott (Pennsylvania politician, born 1784) (1784–1850), US representative from Pennsylvania
- John Scott (Pennsylvania politician, born 1824) (1824–1896), US senator from Pennsylvania
- John B. Scott (New York politician) (1789–1854), American lawyer and politician from New York
- John L. Scott Jr. (1953–2023), American politician in the South Carolina Senate
- John B. Scott (Texas politician), Texas secretary of state
- John R. Scott (Iowa politician) (born 1944), Iowa state senator
- John T. Scott (Indiana judge) (1831–1891), justice of the Indiana Supreme Court
- Jock Scott (politician) (1947–2009), American politician

=== Kingdom of England ===
- John Scott (MP for Hastings), 1385–1393, MP for Hastings
- John Scott (died 1485) (c. 1423–1485), English Yorkist during the Wars of the Roses, Warden of the Cinque Ports
- John Scott (died 1533) (1480s–1533), MP for New Romney, England
- John Scott (MP for Ripon) (fl. 1572)
- John Scott (soldier) (c. 1564–1616), English landowner, army officer and politician
- Captain John Scott (c. 1634?–1704), cartographer and Long Island settler
- John Scott (MP for York), (died 1664), MP for York
- John Scott (died 1619), MP for Chippenham

=== Kingdom of Scotland ===
- John Scot, Lord Scotstarvit (1585–1670), Scottish lawyer, politician, and writer
- John Scott (Scottish judge), Senator of the College of Justice

=== Kingdom of Great Britain ===
- John Scott (British Army officer) (1725–1775), Scottish politician, MP Caithness, Tain Burghs, and Fife
- John Scott, 1st Earl of Clonmell (1739–1798), Irish barrister and judge
- John Scott (junior), MP for Boroughbridge 1799–1806
- John Scott-Waring (1747–1819), English political agent and Member of Parliament
- John Scott, 1st Earl of Eldon (1751–1838), Lord High Chancellor of Britain

=== United Kingdom ===
- John Scott, 2nd Earl of Eldon (1805–1854), British peer and Tory politician
- Lord John Scott (1809–1860), landowner and member of parliament for Roxburghshire
- John Scott (governor) (1814–1898), British colonial official and governor
- John Scott (English judge) (1841–1904), English judge
- John Scott (colonial administrator) (1878–1946), British colonial administrator
- John Scott, 9th Duke of Buccleuch (1923–2007), Scottish peer, politician and landowner
- John Scott (MSP) (born 1951), former member of Scottish Parliament

=== Australia and Canada ===
- John Scott (South Australian politician) (born 1934), member of the Australian House of Representatives
- John Scott (Queensland politician) (1821–1898), member of the Queensland Legislative Assembly & Legislative Council, Australia
- John Scott (Canadian politician) (1822–1857), first mayor of Bytown, later Ottawa, Canada

== Science and architecture ==
- John Scott (entomologist) (1823–1888), English entomologist
- John Scott (botanist) (1836–1880), Scottish botanist
- John Scott (shipbuilder) (1830–1903), Scottish engineer and shipbuilder
- John Scott (agricultural engineer) (c. 1846–1909), Scottish pioneer of motorized farming
- John Oldrid Scott (1841–1913), English architect
- John Scott (architect) (1924–1992), New Zealand architect
- John Scott (medical researcher) (1931–2015), New Zealand scientist and medic
- Jack Scott (meteorologist) (1923–2008), British television weatherman
- John Scott (physician, died 1846) (1798–1846), English surgeon
- John Scott (physician, died 1859) (1797–1859), Scottish surgeon and physician in Scotland to Queen Victoria

== Sports ==
=== Association football ===
- John Scott (1890s footballer), Scottish footballer who played for Sunderland as a forward
- John Scott (1920s footballer) (c. 1889–?, Scottish footballer
- John Scott (footballer, born 1872) (1872–?), Scottish footballer
- John Scott (footballer, born 1890) (1890–?), English footballer
- John Scott (footballer, born 1942), English footballer
- Jock Scott (footballer) (1906–1981), Scottish footballer

=== Baseball ===
- John Scott (1970s outfielder) (born 1952), American professional baseball outfielder
- John Scott (1940s outfielder) (1913–1967), American Negro leagues baseball player
- John William Scott (1887–1962), American professional baseball shortstop, also known as Jim Scott

=== Other sports ===
- John Scott Jr. (born 1975), American football coach and former player
- Jock Scott (rugby union) (1887–1967), Scottish rugby union player
- John Scott (rugby union, born 1935) (1935–2020), English international rugby union player
- John Scott (rugby union, born 1954), English international rugby union player
- John A. R. Scott, first basketball head coach of Syracuse University
- John Scott (cricket and rugby league) (1888–1964), Australian cricketer and Test umpire
- John Scott (English cricketer) (1888–1946), English cricketer
- John Scott (horseman) (1794–1871), British thoroughbred racehorse trainer
- John Scott (ice hockey, born 1928), Canadian professional ice hockey winger
- John Scott (ice hockey, born 1982), Canadian professional ice hockey winger/defenseman
- John Scott (sailor) (1934–1993), Australian competitive sailor
- John Scott (badminton) (born 1954), Northern Irish badminton player

== Other ==
- John Scott (adventurer) (c. 1634–1696), Captain John Scott, Long Island founder, explorer, royal advisor
- John Scott (banker) (1757–1832), English evangelical and pacifist
- John Scott (Royal Navy officer) (1764–1805), warrant officer in the Royal Navy, friend and secretary to Lord Nelson
- John Paul Scott (1927–1987), American Alcatraz escapee who reached San Francisco by swimming
- John Walter Scott (1845–1919), English-American stamp dealer
- John Scott, founder of Montgomery, Alabama
- John L. Scott, real estate company in Seattle
- John Maurice Scott (1948–2001), Director General of the Fiji Red Cross, murdered in 2001
- John Corse Scott (1756–1840), surgeon, naturalist, and Scottish landowner
- John Wallace Scott (1832–1903), American soldier who fought in the American Civil War
- John Scott (archdeacon of Dromore) (born 1946), Irish Anglican priest
- John Scott (dean of Lismore) (died 1828), Irish Anglican priest
- John Scott (1777–1834), English priest, biographer on his father Thomas Scott
- Jock Scott (1817–?), creator of the Jock Scott fly

== See also ==
- Jon Scott (born 1958), American television host and presenter on Fox News Channel
- Jonathan Scott (disambiguation)
- Johnny Scott (disambiguation)
- Jack Scott (disambiguation)
- Scott (name)
