= Results of the 1987 Australian federal election in South Australia =

1987 Australian federal election (South Australia)
← 1984	11 July 1987	1990 →

All 13 South Australia seats in the Australian House of Representatives and all 12 seats in the Australian Senate
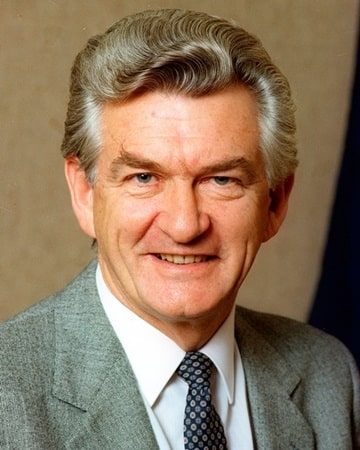

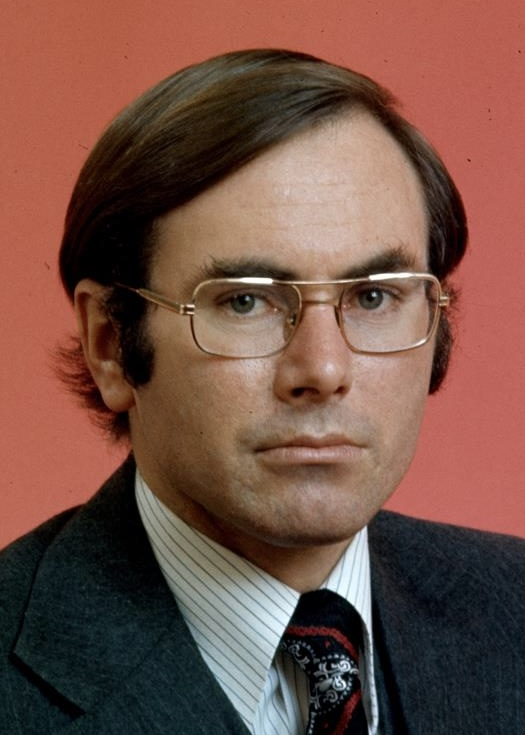
	First party	Second party
Leader	Bob Hawke	John Howard
Party	Labor	Liberal/National coalition
Last election	9 seats	5 seats
Seats won	8 seats	5 seats
Seat change	Steady	Steady
Popular vote	367,045	381,146
Percentage	44.6%	46.3%
Swing	▼3.8	▲4.2
TPP	50.2%	49.8%
TPP swing	▼1.4	▲1.4

This is a list of electoral division results for the Australian 1987 federal election in the state of South Australia.

== Overall results ==
Turnout 93.8% (CV) — Informal 6.8%
Party	Votes	%	Swing	Seats	Change
Liberal	350,218	42.51	0.41	5	Steady
National	30,928	3.75	3.75		Steady
Liberal/National Coalition	381,146	46.26	4.16	5	Steady
Labor	367,045	44.55	-3.83	8	Steady
Democrats	64,163	7.79	0.85		
Unite Australia	7,329	0.89	0.00		
Independents	3,664	0.44	0.02		
Communist	535	0.06	0.00		
Total	823,882			13	
Two-party-preferred vote
Labor	413,827	50.24	-1.43	8	Steady
Liberal/National Coalition	409,828	49.76	1.43	5	Steady
Invalid/blank votes	60,536	6.84	-1.85		
Turnout	884,418	93.80			
Registered voters	942,885				
Source: Psephos Adam Carr's Election Archive 1987

== Results by division ==
=== Adelaide ===
1987 Australian federal election: Adelaide
Party	Candidate	Votes	%	±%
Labor	Chris Hurford	31,572	48.9	−6.4
Liberal	Peter Panagaris	22,943	35.5	−0.3
Democrats	Chris Wurm	5,857	9.1	+2.2
National	Bryan Stokes	3,287	5.1	+4.4
Communist	Graham Smith	535	0.8	+0.8
Unite Australia	Charles Shahin	368	0.6	+0.6
Total formal votes		64,562	92.4	
Informal votes		5,320	7.6	
Turnout		69,882	92.6	
Two-party-preferred result
Labor	Chris Hurford	36,468	56.5	−3.5
Liberal	Peter Panagaris	28,056	43.5	+3.5
Labor hold		Swing	−3.5	

=== Barker ===
1987 Australian federal election: Barker
Party	Candidate	Votes	%	±%
Liberal	James Porter	33,296	52.2	−5.1
Labor	Bill Hender	21,221	33.3	−1.3
National	Max Vawser	3,924	6.2	+3.3
Democrats	Glenn Taylor	3,602	5.6	+0.3
Independent	Harry Pfeuffer	884	1.4	+1.4
Unite Australia	Tom Giannouklas	451	0.7	+0.7
Independent	Allan Bannister	385	0.6	+0.6
Total formal votes		63,763	93.4	
Informal votes		4,481	6.6	
Turnout		68,244	95.0	
Two-party-preferred result
Liberal	James Porter	39,273	61.6	−1.1
Labor	Bill Hender	24,448	38.4	+1.1
Liberal hold		Swing	−1.1	

=== Bonython ===
1987 Australian federal election: Bonython
Party	Candidate	Votes	%	±%
Labor	Neal Blewett	38,150	61.3	−2.7
Liberal	Bernhard Buechner	15,115	24.3	−2.3
Democrats	Colin Maas	5,887	9.5	+0.1
National	Cathryn Linedale	2,233	3.6	+3.6
Unite Australia	John Longhurst	825	1.3	+1.3
Total formal votes		62,210	91.6	
Informal votes		5,700	8.4	
Turnout		67,910	93.9	
Two-party-preferred result
Labor	Neal Blewett	42,338	68.1	−0.8
Liberal	Bernhard Buechner	19,862	31.9	+0.8
Labor hold		Swing	−0.8	

=== Boothby ===
1987 Australian federal election: Boothby
Party	Candidate	Votes	%	±%
Liberal	Steele Hall	35,150	54.1	−0.1
Labor	Jayne Taylor	20,837	32.1	−2.9
Democrats	Margaret-Ann Williams	6,523	10.0	+0.2
National	Clarrie Dietman	1,930	3.0	+2.1
Unite Australia	Kevin Angove	494	0.8	+0.8
Total formal votes		64,934	95.4	
Informal votes		3,135	4.6	
Turnout		68,069	93.0	
Two-party-preferred result
Liberal	Steele Hall	40,004	61.6	+2.4
Labor	Jayne Taylor	24,915	38.4	−2.4
Liberal hold		Swing	+2.4	

=== Grey ===
1987 Australian federal election: Grey
Party	Candidate	Votes	%	±%
Labor	Lloyd O'Neil	32,005	51.9	−0.6
Liberal	Russell Reid	21,759	35.3	−2.3
National	Robin Dixon-Thompson	4,189	6.8	+2.9
Democrats	Chris James	3,286	5.3	−0.7
Unite Australia	Leonce Kealy	480	0.8	+0.8
Total formal votes		61,719	93.9	
Informal votes		3,996	6.1	
Turnout		65,715	93.0	
Two-party-preferred result
Labor	Lloyd O'Neil	34,425	55.8	−1.3
Liberal	Russell Reid	27,271	44.2	+1.3
Labor hold		Swing	−1.3	

=== Hawker ===
1987 Australian federal election: Hawker
Party	Candidate	Votes	%	±%
Labor	Elizabeth Harvey	29,560	46.2	−3.0
Liberal	Kim Jacobs	28,116	43.9	+2.4
Democrats	Graham Pamount	4,439	6.9	−0.8
National	David Dwyer	1,203	1.9	+0.2
Unite Australia	Keith Draper	719	1.1	+1.1
Total formal votes		64,037	94.1	
Informal votes		3,991	5.9	
Turnout		68,028	93.6	
Two-party-preferred result
Labor	Elizabeth Harvey	32,782	51.2	−2.2
Liberal	Kim Jacobs	31,243	48.8	+2.2
Labor hold		Swing	−2.2	

=== Hindmarsh ===
1987 Australian federal election: Hindmarsh
Party	Candidate	Votes	%	±%
Labor	John Scott	30,782	49.0	−2.6
Liberal	Barry Lewis	23,792	37.9	+0.3
Democrats	Jim Mitchell	5,239	8.3	−1.7
National	Glenn Jarvis	2,074	3.3	+3.3
Independent	Sofia Mavrogeorgis	544	0.9	+0.9
Unite Australia	Stewart Clarke	405	0.6	+0.6
Total formal votes		62,836	91.5	
Informal votes		5,865	8.5	
Turnout		68,701	93.2	
Two-party-preferred result
Labor	John Scott	34,615	55.1	−1.3
Liberal	Barry Lewis	28,189	44.9	+1.3
Labor hold		Swing	−1.3	

=== Kingston ===
1987 Australian federal election: Kingston
Party	Candidate	Votes	%	±%
Labor	Gordon Bilney	30,138	48.3	−2.4
Liberal	Richard Noble	23,997	38.5	+2.8
Democrats	Colin Miller	5,819	9.3	+0.7
National	Gerald Larkin	1,874	3.0	+2.0
Unite Australia	Michael Prowse	539	0.9	+0.9
Total formal votes		62,367	93.6	
Informal votes		4,231	6.4	
Turnout		66,598	95.0	
Two-party-preferred result
Labor	Gordon Bilney	34,157	54.8	−2.6
Liberal	Richard Noble	28,203	45.2	+2.6
Labor hold		Swing	−2.6	

=== Makin ===
1987 Australian federal election: Makin
Party	Candidate	Votes	%	±%
Labor	Peter Duncan	29,361	47.3	−0.9
Liberal	Neville Joyce	24,465	39.4	+0.4
Democrats	Sandra Kanck	5,606	9.0	−0.5
National	Natalie Richardson	1,505	2.4	+1.7
Unite Australia	Kenneth Taplin	671	1.1	+1.1
Independent	A. Wunderlich	441	0.7	+0.7
Total formal votes		62,049	93.4	
Informal votes		4,398	6.6	
Turnout		66,447	94.8	
Two-party-preferred result
Labor	Peter Duncan	33,130	53.4	−1.0
Liberal	Neville Joyce	28,904	46.6	+1.0
Labor hold		Swing	−1.0	

=== Mayo ===
1987 Australian federal election: Mayo
Party	Candidate	Votes	%	±%
Liberal	Alexander Downer	35,040	54.0	+1.6
Labor	Delia Skorin	19,685	30.3	−3.7
Democrats	Merilyn Pedrick	6,246	9.6	+0.5
National	Wesley Glanville	2,550	3.9	−0.5
Unite Australia	Dorothy McGregory-Dey	783	1.2	+1.2
Independent	George Gater	607	0.9	+0.9
Total formal votes		64,911	94.1	
Informal votes		4,100	5.9	
Turnout		69,011	93.6	
Two-party-preferred result
Liberal	Alexander Downer	40,656	62.6	+2.2
Labor	Delia Skorin	24,243	37.4	−2.2
Liberal hold		Swing	+2.2	

=== Port Adelaide ===
1987 Australian federal election: Port Adelaide
Party	Candidate	Votes	%	±%
Labor	Mick Young	38,196	61.3	−0.9
Liberal	Barry Blundell	17,780	28.6	+0.0
Democrats	Derek Ball	3,785	6.1	−1.0
National	Rod Scarborough	1,283	2.1	+2.1
Independent	John Buik	509	0.8	+0.8
Unite Australia	Bob Manhire	418	0.7	+0.7
Independent	Brian Rooney	294	0.5	+0.5
Total formal votes		62,265	90.8	
Informal votes		6,311	9.2	
Turnout		68,576	93.7	
Two-party-preferred result
Labor	Mick Young	41,276	66.3	−1.5
Liberal	Barry Blundell	20,979	33.7	+1.5
Labor hold		Swing	−1.5	

=== Sturt ===
1987 Australian federal election: Sturt
Party	Candidate	Votes	%	±%
Liberal	Ian Wilson	32,262	51.3	−1.2
Labor	Phil Robins	23,946	38.1	−2.2
Democrats	Karen Coleman	5,191	8.3	+1.1
National	Loma Silsbury	1,050	1.7	+1.7
Unite Australia	Graeme Matthews	419	0.7	+0.7
Total formal votes		62,868	93.2	
Informal votes		4,569	6.8	
Turnout		67,437	93.6	
Two-party-preferred result
Liberal	Ian Wilson	35,562	56.6	+0.6
Labor	Phil Robins	27,297	43.4	−0.6
Liberal hold		Swing	+0.6	

=== Wakefield ===
1987 Australian federal election: Wakefield
Party	Candidate	Votes	%	±%
Liberal	Neil Andrew	36,503	55.8	−1.5
Labor	Susan Stephens	21,592	33.0	−0.8
National	Bill Adams	3,826	5.9	+3.0
Democrats	Barbara Barlow	2,683	4.1	−1.9
Unite Australia	Anne Hausler	757	1.2	+1.2
Total formal votes		65,361	93.6	
Informal votes		4,439	6.4	
Turnout		69,800	94.5	
Two-party-preferred result
Liberal	Neil Andrew	41,626	63.7	+0.8
Labor	Susan Stephens	23,733	36.3	−0.8
Liberal hold		Swing	+0.8	

== See also ==
- Results of the 1987 Australian federal election (House of Representatives)
- Members of the Australian House of Representatives, 1987–1990
