= Results of the 1984 Australian federal election in South Australia =

1984 Australian federal election (South Australia)
← 1983	1 December 1984	1987 →

All 13 South Australian seats in the Australian House of Representatives and 7 seats in the Australian Senate
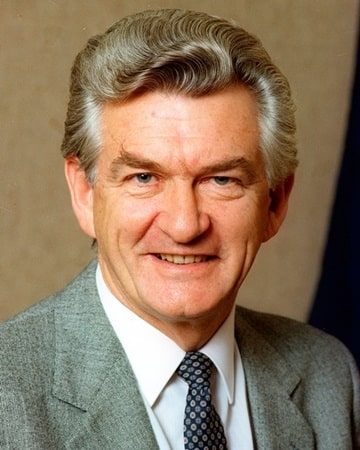

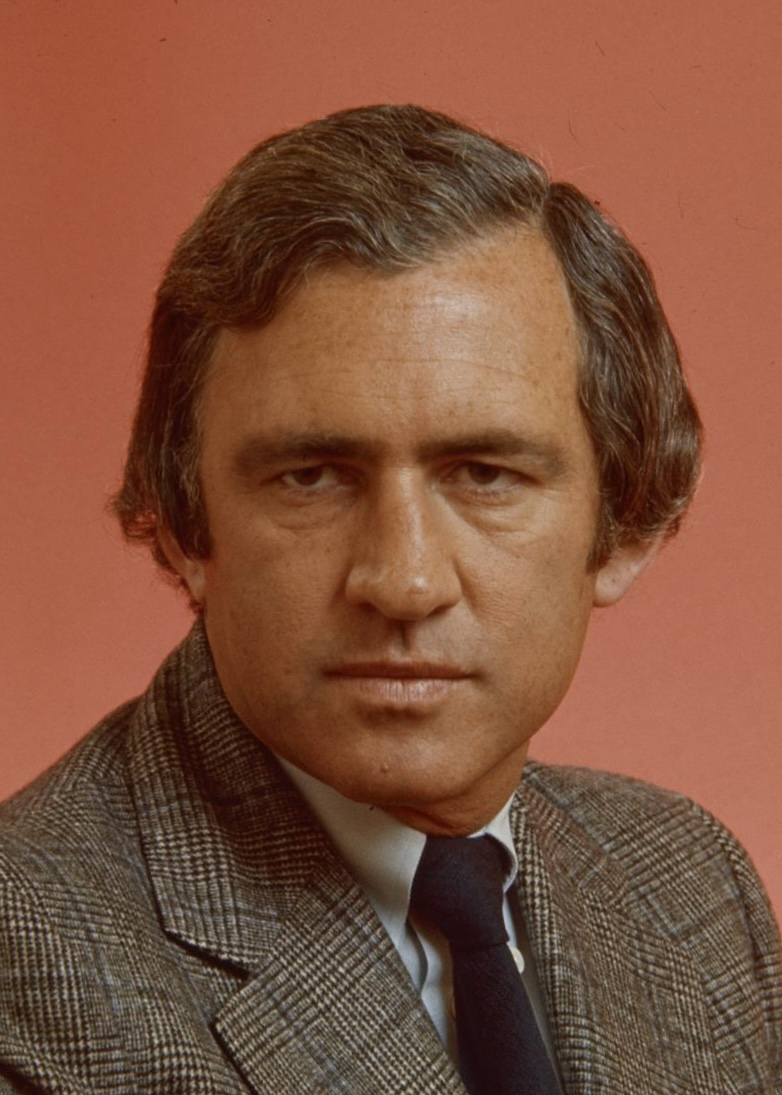
	First party	Second party
Leader	Bob Hawke	Andrew Peacock
Party	Labor	Liberal/National coalition
Last election	7 seats	4 seats
Seats won	8 seats	5 seats
Seat change	▲1	▲1
Popular vote	367,915	348,862
Percentage	6.87%	47.1%
Swing	▼1.5	▲2.35
TPP	51.7%	48.3
TPP swing	▼0.6	▲0.6

This is a list of electoral division results for the Australian 1984 federal election in the state of South Australia.

== Overall results ==
Turnout 94.9% (CV) — Informal 8.7%
Party	Votes	%	Swing	Seats	Change
Liberal	337,253	42.97	0.87	5	▲1
National	11,609	1.48	1.48		Steady
Liberal/National Coalition	348,862	44.45	2.35	5	▲1
Labor	367,915	46.87	-1.51	8	▲1
Democrats	61,822	7.88	0.94		
Nuclear Disarmament	2,270	0.29			
Independent	2,205	0.28	-0.14		
Socialist Workers	1,836	0.23	-0.65		
Total	784,910			13	▲2
Two-party-preferred vote
Labor	405,496	51.67	-0.63	8	▲1
Liberal/National Coalition	379,305	48.33	0.63	5	▲1
Invalid/blank votes	74,719	8.69	6.02		
Turnout	859,629	94.85			
Registered voters	906,278				
Source: Federal Election Results 1949-1993

== Results by division ==
=== Adelaide ===
1984 Australian federal election: Adelaide
Party	Candidate	Votes	%	±%
Labor	Chris Hurford	34,960	55.3	+1.8
Liberal	Jenni London	22,650	35.8	−0.9
Democrats	Andrew Sickerdick	4,383	6.9	+0.3
Independent	Mark Thiel	479	0.8	+0.8
National	Bryan Stokes	434	0.7	+0.7
Independent	John Buik	284	0.5	−2.2
Total formal votes		63,190	90.0	
Informal votes		7,031	10.0	
Turnout		70,221	94.5	
Two-party-preferred result
Labor	Chris Hurford	37,894	60.0	−0.3
Liberal	Jenni London	25,290	40.0	+0.3
Labor hold		Swing	−0.3	

=== Barker ===
1984 Australian federal election: Barker
Party	Candidate	Votes	%	±%
Liberal	James Porter	35,429	57.3	+1.4
Labor	Jeremy Moore	21,412	34.6	+0.8
Democrats	Meg Lees	3,266	5.3	+0.1
National	Richard Jacka	1,775	2.9	−2.0
Total formal votes		61,882	92.8	
Informal votes		4,835	7.2	
Turnout		66,717	95.5	
Two-party-preferred result
Liberal	James Porter	38,763	62.6	+0.3
Labor	Jeremy Moore	23,113	37.4	−0.3
Liberal hold		Swing	+0.3	

=== Bonython ===
1984 Australian federal election: Bonython
Party	Candidate	Votes	%	±%
Labor	Neal Blewett	35,817	64.0	−0.7
Liberal	Graham Sara	14,902	26.6	+0.1
Democrats	John Longhurst	5,279	9.4	+0.6
Total formal votes		55,998	88.1	
Informal votes		7,573	11.9	
Turnout		63,571	94.7	
Two-party-preferred result
Labor	Neal Blewett	38,578	68.9	−1.1
Liberal	Graham Sara	17,418	31.1	+1.1
Labor hold		Swing	−1.1	

=== Boothby ===
1984 Australian federal election: Boothby
Party	Candidate	Votes	%	±%
Liberal	Steele Hall	33,640	54.2	+0.7
Labor	Bruce Whyatt	21,736	35.0	−0.6
Democrats	Margaret-Ann Williams	6,064	9.8	−1.1
National	Douglas Lindley	585	0.9	+0.9
Total formal votes		62,025	94.7	
Informal votes		3,472	5.3	
Turnout		65,497	94.0	
Two-party-preferred result
Liberal	Steele Hall	36,724	59.2	+0.7
Labor	Bruce Whyatt	25,292	40.8	−0.7
Liberal hold		Swing	+0.7	

=== Grey ===
1984 Australian federal election: Grey
Party	Candidate	Votes	%	±%
Labor	Lloyd O'Neil	31,518	52.5	+0.3
Liberal	Russell Reid	22,584	37.6	+4.8
Democrats	Harm Folkers	3,626	6.0	+0.2
National	Robin Dixon-Thompson	2,354	3.9	−1.1
Total formal votes		60,082	90.6	
Informal votes		6,248	9.4	
Turnout		66,330	94.7	
Two-party-preferred result
Labor	Lloyd O'Neil	34,278	57.1	−0.2
Liberal	Russell Reid	25,799	42.9	+0.2
Labor hold		Swing	−0.2	

=== Hawker ===
1984 Australian federal election: Hawker
Party	Candidate	Votes	%	±%
Labor	Ralph Jacobi	30,956	49.2	−0.2
Liberal	Charles Campbell	26,101	41.5	+0.0
Democrats	Graham Pamount	4,852	7.7	+0.9
National	Thomas Correll	1,045	1.7	+1.7
Total formal votes		62,954	92.4	
Informal votes		5,171	7.6	
Turnout		68,125	94.6	
Two-party-preferred result
Labor	Ralph Jacobi	33,594	53.4	−1.2
Liberal	Charles Campbell	29,341	46.6	+1.2
Labor hold		Swing	−1.2	

=== Hindmarsh ===
1984 Australian federal election: Hindmarsh
Party	Candidate	Votes	%	±%
Labor	John Scott	31,595	51.6	−2.3
Liberal	Barry Lewis	23,011	37.6	+2.0
Democrats	Ian Haines	6,124	10.0	+2.4
Socialist Workers	Paul Petit	542	0.9	−2.0
Total formal votes		61,272	90.0	
Informal votes		6,781	10.0	
Turnout		68,053	94.3	
Two-party-preferred result
Labor	John Scott	34,556	56.4	−3.4
Liberal	Barry Lewis	26,707	43.6	+3.4
Labor hold		Swing	−3.4	

=== Kingston ===
1984 Australian federal election: Kingston
Party	Candidate	Votes	%	±%
Labor	Gordon Bilney	29,140	50.7	−1.4
Liberal	Richard Noble	20,546	35.7	−6.0
Democrats	Robert Ralph	4,951	8.6	+2.3
Nuclear Disarmament	Paul Breakwell	2,270	3.9	+3.9
National	Neville Agars	584	1.0	+1.0
Total formal votes		57,491	91.5	
Informal votes		5,308	8.5	
Turnout		62,799	95.3	
Two-party-preferred result
Labor	Gordon Bilney	32,965	57.4	+2.2
Liberal	Richard Noble	24,514	42.6	−2.2
Labor hold		Swing	+2.2	

=== Makin ===
1984 Australian federal election: Makin
Party	Candidate	Votes	%	±%
Labor	Peter Duncan	27,282	48.2	−5.8
Liberal	Neville Joyce	22,073	39.0	+2.7
Democrats	Andrew Coventry	5,401	9.5	+0.4
Independent	Bernhard Buechner	1,442	2.5	+2.5
National	John Henderson	412	0.7	+0.7
Total formal votes		56,610	90.3	
Informal votes		6,088	9.7	
Turnout		62,698	94.9	
Two-party-preferred result
Labor	Peter Duncan	30,792	54.4	−4.8
Liberal	Neville Joyce	25,806	45.6	+4.8
Labor notional hold		Swing	−4.8	

=== Mayo ===
1984 Australian federal election: Mayo
Party	Candidate	Votes	%	±%
Liberal	Alexander Downer	31,131	52.4	−3.5
Labor	John Quirke	20,194	34.0	+1.0
Democrats	Donald Chisholm	5,424	9.1	+0.8
National	Bob Shearer	2,620	4.4	+4.4
Total formal votes		59,369	92.2	
Informal votes		5,030	7.8	
Turnout		64,399	95.1	
Two-party-preferred result
Liberal	Alexander Downer	35,922	60.5	−1.8
Labor	John Quirke	23,436	39.5	+1.8
Liberal notional hold		Swing	−1.8	

=== Port Adelaide ===
1984 Australian federal election: Port Adelaide
Party	Candidate	Votes	%	±%
Labor	Mick Young	37,440	62.2	−2.0
Liberal	Thomas Ireland	17,208	28.6	+1.9
Democrats	Robert Manhire	4,295	7.1	+3.6
Socialist Workers	Deborah Gordon	1,294	2.1	−2.2
Total formal votes		60,237	89.3	
Informal votes		7,201	10.7	
Turnout		67,438	94.8	
Two-party-preferred result
Labor	Mick Young	40,855	67.8	−2.6
Liberal	Thomas Ireland	19,375	32.2	+2.6
Labor hold		Swing	−2.6	

=== Sturt ===
1984 Australian federal election: Sturt
Party	Candidate	Votes	%	±%
Liberal	Ian Wilson	32,404	52.5	+2.1
Labor	Jim Gale	24,901	40.3	−0.4
Democrats	Alison Dolling	4,443	7.2	−1.7
Total formal votes		61,748	92.9	
Informal votes		4,687	7.1	
Turnout		66,435	95.0	
Two-party-preferred result
Liberal	Ian Wilson	34,599	56.0	+2.0
Labor	Jim Gale	27,146	44.0	−2.0
Liberal hold		Swing	+2.0	

=== Wakefield ===
1984 Australian federal election: Wakefield
Party	Candidate	Votes	%	±%
Liberal	Neil Andrew	35,574	57.3	−1.6
Labor	Suzanne Owens	20,964	33.8	+0.3
Democrats	Anne Hausler	3,714	6.0	+0.7
National	Terry Halford	1,800	2.9	+0.6
Total formal votes		62,052	92.1	
Informal votes		5,294	7.9	
Turnout		67,346	95.4	
Two-party-preferred result
Liberal	Neil Andrew	39,047	62.9	−0.2
Labor	Suzanne Owens	22,997	37.1	+0.2
Liberal hold		Swing	−0.2	

== See also ==
- Results of the 1984 Australian federal election (House of Representatives)
- Members of the Australian House of Representatives, 1984–1987
