= Mount Sinai, New York =

- Hamlet and census-designated place
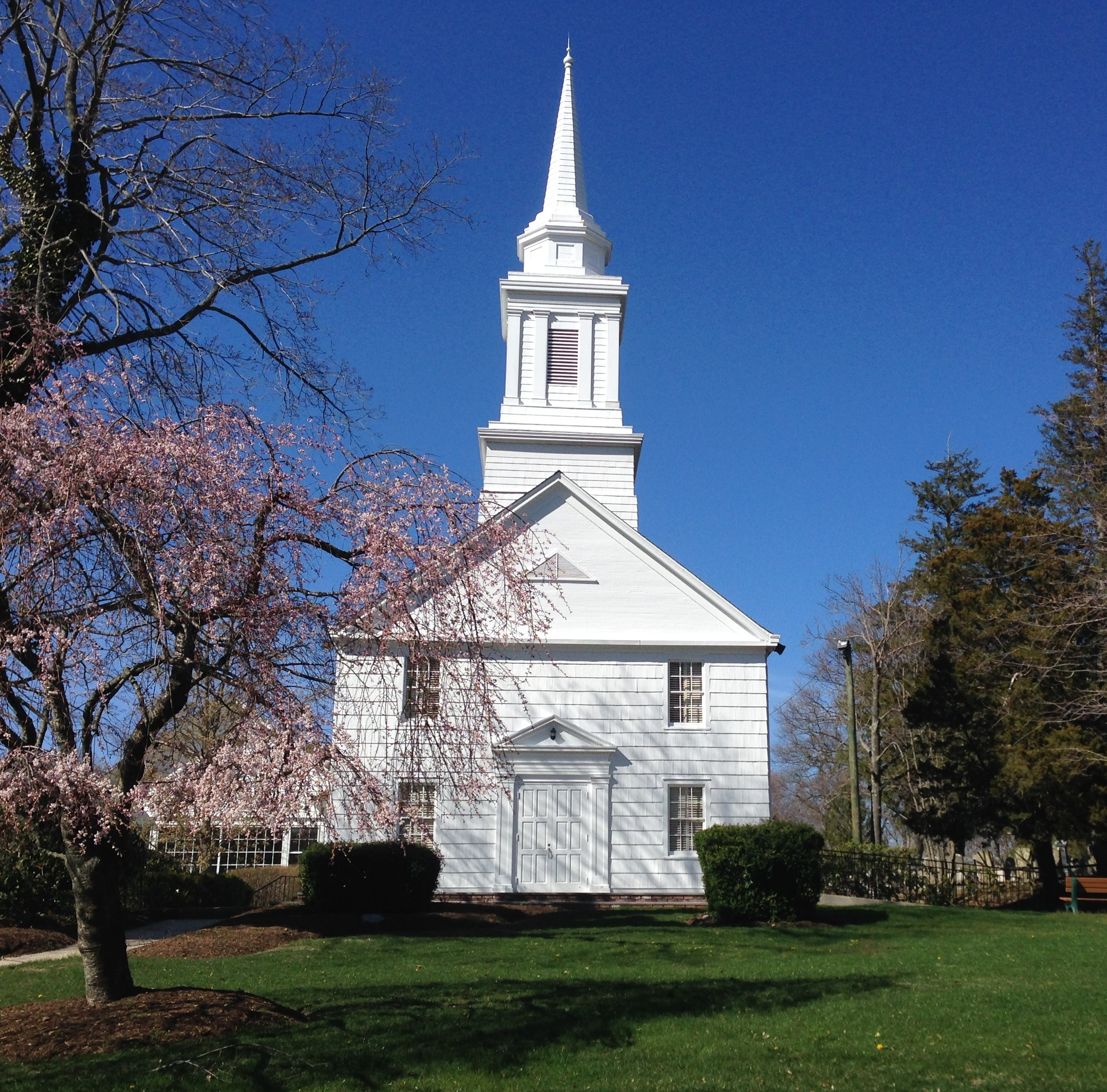
- The c.1807 Mount Sinai Congregational Church

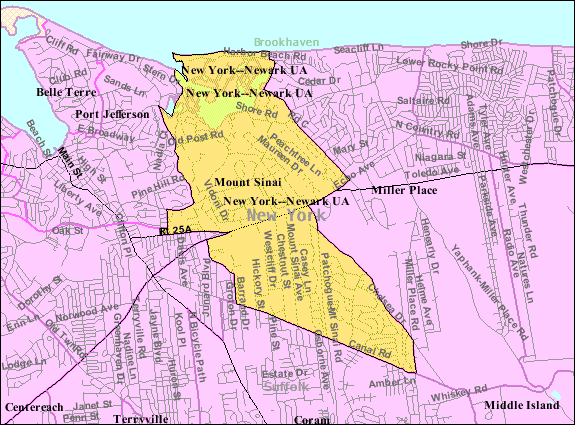
- U.S. Census map

- Location within the state of New York Mount Sinai (New York) Mount Sinai (the United States)
- Coordinates: 40°56′19″N 73°1′7″W
- Country: United States
- State: New York
- County: Suffolk

Area
  - Total: 7.44 sq mi (19.27 km^{2})
  - Land: 6.00 sq mi (15.54 km^{2})
  - Water: 1.44 sq mi (3.73 km^{2})
- Elevation: 33 ft (10 m)

Population (2020)
  - Total: 11,623
  - Density: 1,937.4/sq mi (748.02/km^{2})
- Time zone: UTC−05:00 (Eastern Time Zone)
  - Summer (DST): UTC−04:00
- ZIP Code: 11766
- Area codes: 631, 934
- FIPS code: 36-49066
- GNIS feature ID: 0957909

Mount Sinai is a hamlet and census-designated place (CDP) located within the Town of Brookhaven, in Suffolk County, New York, United States. As of the 2020 census, Mount Sinai had a population of 11,623. The hamlet is located on the North Shore of Long Island.

Mount Sinai was first settled in the 1660s and was known by the name of Old Mans until a name change in the 1840s. Initially an agricultural hamlet, it transitioned into a popular resort town in the late-19th century and developed into a suburb of New York City in the mid-20th century. While primarily a residential community, the hamlet contains Mount Sinai Harbor and its popular public beach, Cedar Beach.

== History ==
Mount Sinai was founded in the 1664 as an early European settlement.

=== Origins ===
The area now known as Mount Sinai was originally called Nonowatuck, or "stream that dries up", by the Seatocot family of Native Americans who lived here. The first European settlers were Colonial settlers living in what is now Setauket, who obtained a deed from these local Native Americans in 1664.

The origin of the town's initial European name, "Old Mans", is not known. The most prominent telling concerns Major John Gotherson, an elderly Englishman who was supposedly swindled into incorrectly believing he'd bought land in the New World by Captain John Scott, an important leader in Long Island's early history. After Gotherson sent representatives who were quickly turned away, local residents started to jokingly refer to the land as "the Old Mans".

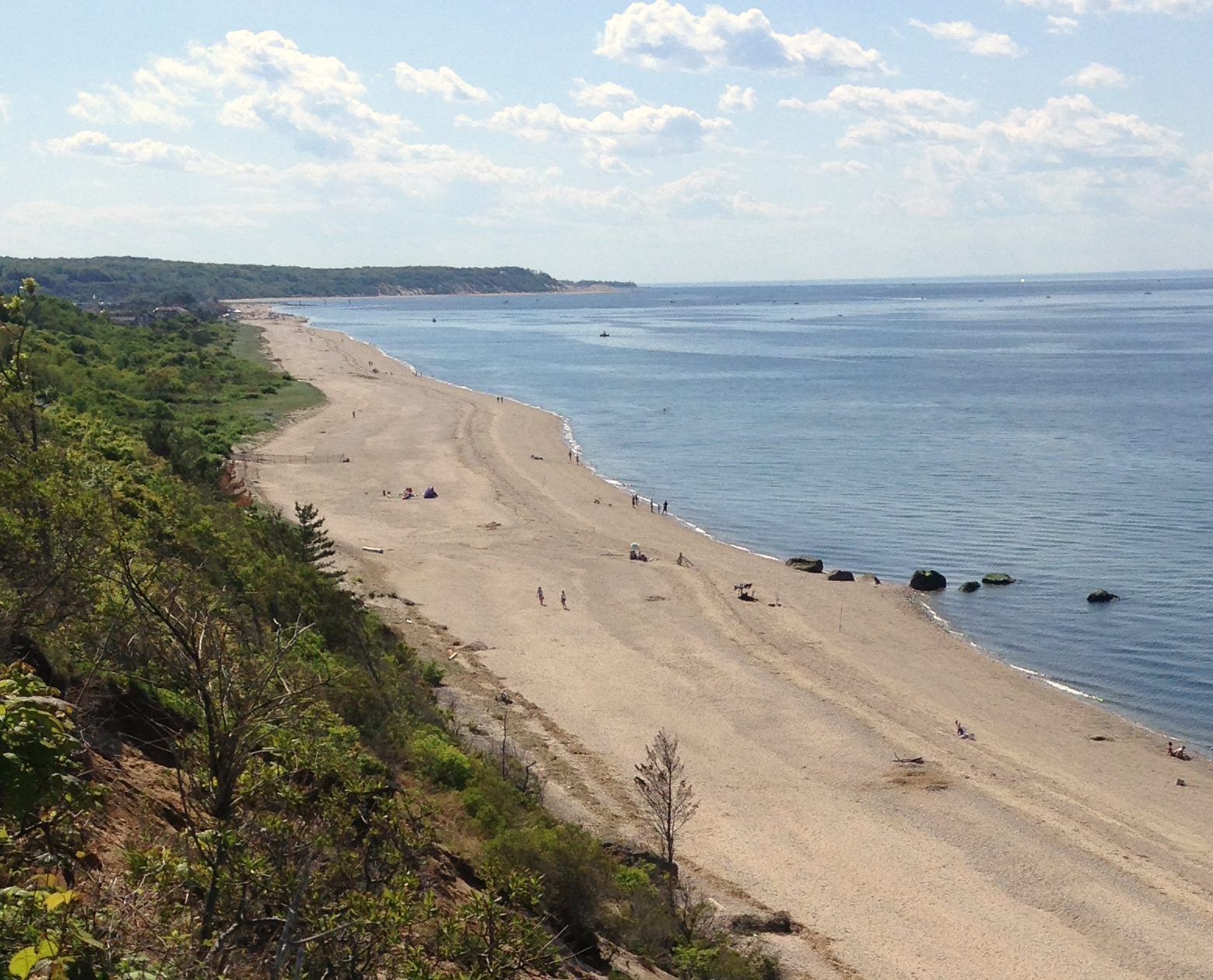
View of Cedar Beach from neighboring Miller Place, New York

During the American Revolution, the area and Old Mans Harbor were under British control. However, because of its remote location the British did not have troops stationed here. Many citizens moved their families to Connecticut during British occupation. During the course of the war, American agents visited local patriots and received information, clothing, supplies and money to support the cause. In 1780, American Major Benjamin Tallmadge and a detachment of Continental Army dragoons landed at Cedar Beach and traveled south to successfully attack the British at Manor St. George. The route he and his men took is now marked as an historic trail, called the Tallmadge Trail that runs from Mt. Sinai, to Mastic Beach, NY.

=== Development as agricultural hamlet ===
Building of houses occurred in spurts. Initially most building occurred within a mile (2 km) of the harbor. Few houses were built south of North Country Road until the late 19th century. Much of the land south of North Country Road was owned and cultivated by farmers.

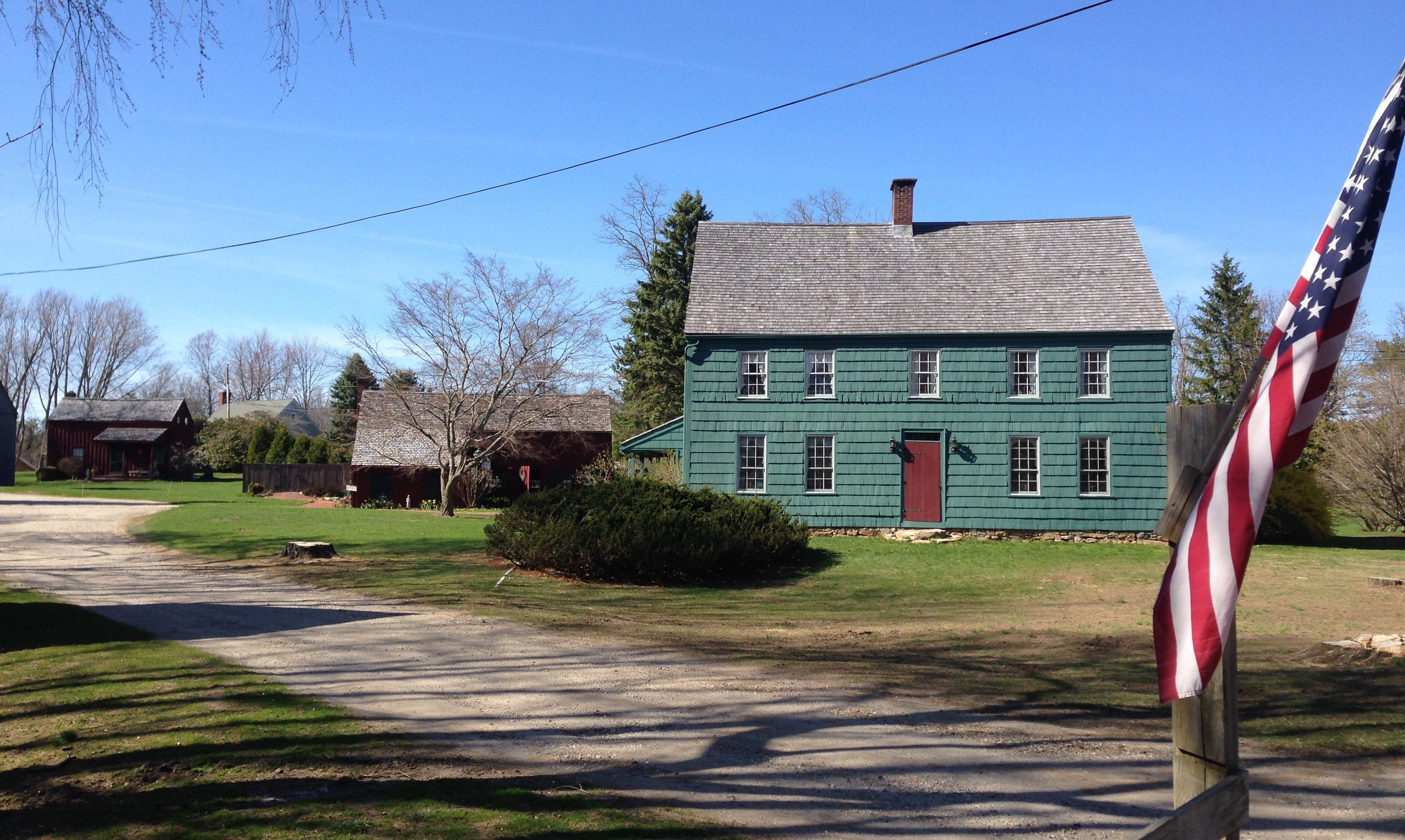
The Davis homestead on North Country Road

There is no known 17th-century structure still standing. The 18th century is represented by six buildings dating from 1705 to 1790. Certain of these homes have structural elements which date from the early period. The 19th century has the largest number of surviving historical structures. These can be divided into two periods, 1800-1840s and 1880-1890s. Again, some of these buildings incorporated structural elements of earlier periods.

In 1840 the people of Old Mans applied for a post office. Evidently Old Mans was not considered a proper name for the area. The name was changed to Mount Vernon. This name was used for only a year as there already was a Mount Vernon in New York. Old Mans was used once again, but for unknown reason another name change occurred. The name Mount Sinai, after the biblical mountain, was chosen by the first postmaster, Charles Phillips. Local legend says that he chose the name arbitrarily by pointing with a knitting needle at random into his Bible. Mount Sinai is the name residents have used since 1841/1842.

In addition to the farmland that populated Old Mans, the town's trees provided much of the wood for the shipbuilding trade centered in neighboring Port Jefferson. A shipyard existed in Old Mans for a time, but this was moved to the naturally deeper harbor of Port Jefferson. Riggers, sail-makers, ship carpenters and others lived in Mount Sinai and commuted to Port Jefferson. Grist mills were located somewhere along Pipe Stave Hollow and Crystal Brook Hollow roads. Records indicate that a number of windmills were located on the hills overlooking the harbor.

As the population expanded, a number of businesses were established along Route 25A. A commercial center did not develop in Mount Sinai and residents depended on businesses in the neighboring village of Port Jefferson.

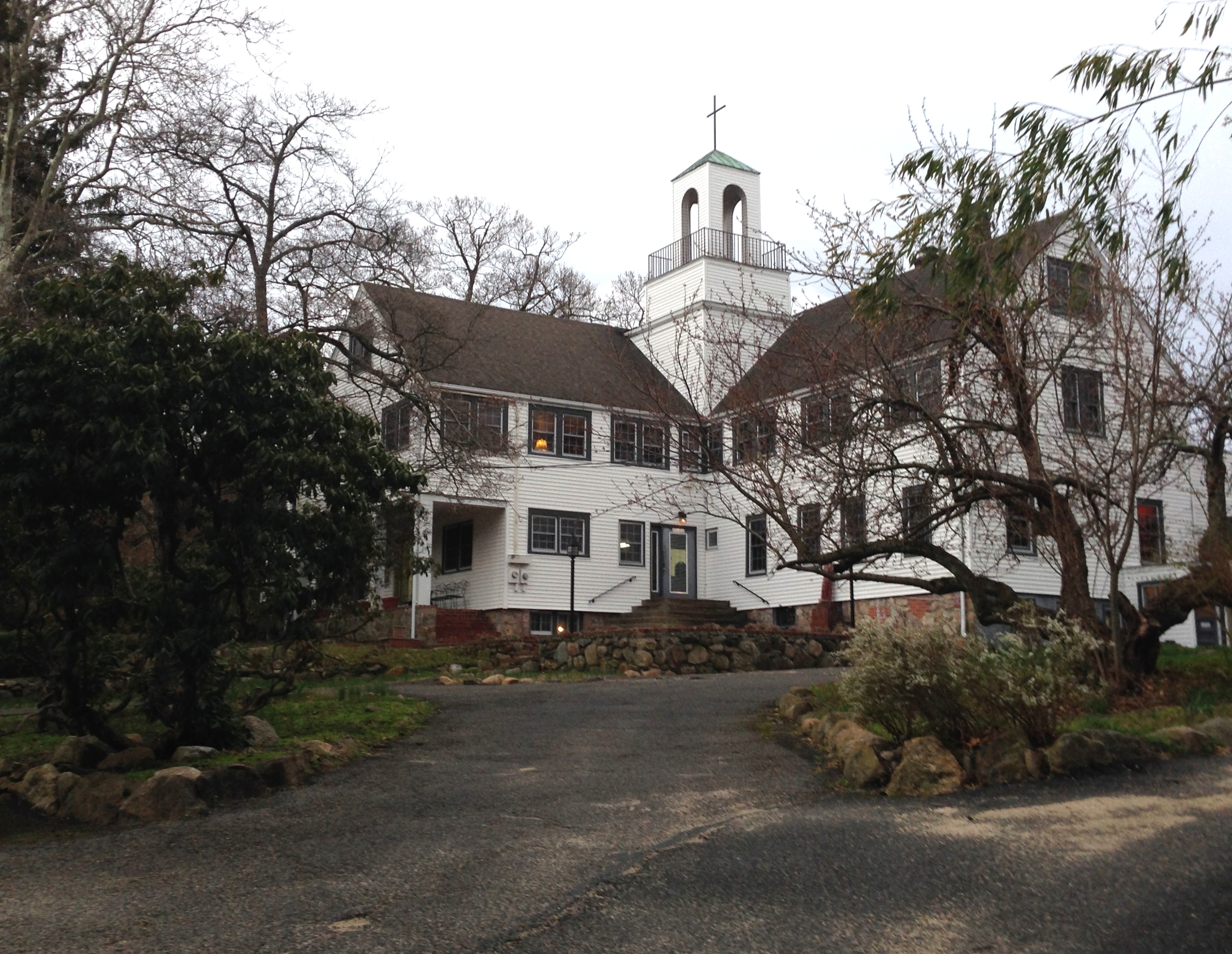
Little Portion Friary, an affiliate of the Society of Saint Francis

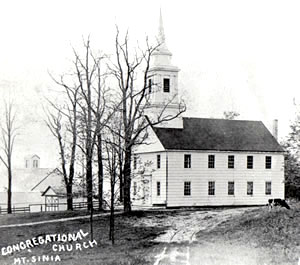
Mount Sinai Congregational Church

=== Houses of worship ===
Prior to 1740, Mount Sinai residents had to travel to Setauket for services. In the 1740s a no-longer-standing Protestant church was built. The local Congregational group was established in 1789 and in 1807 this group erected the still-active Mount Sinai Congregational Church. In the early 19th century, a Methodist church was built on Shore Road, but this was later sold when the congregation joined with that of Port Jefferson.

=== Resort town ===
Once the Long Island Rail Road reached adjacent Port Jefferson in 1879, and temporarily continued east through Mount Sinai to Wading River from 1895 to 1938, new visitors and residents began appearing from New York City and from elsewhere on Long Island in order to enjoy the hamlet's beaches and bucolic setting.

The development of Mount Sinai for its natural and recreational qualities had begun with the 1841 establishment of a special care facility for sick and disabled children on the southwestern side of Mount Sinai Harbor.

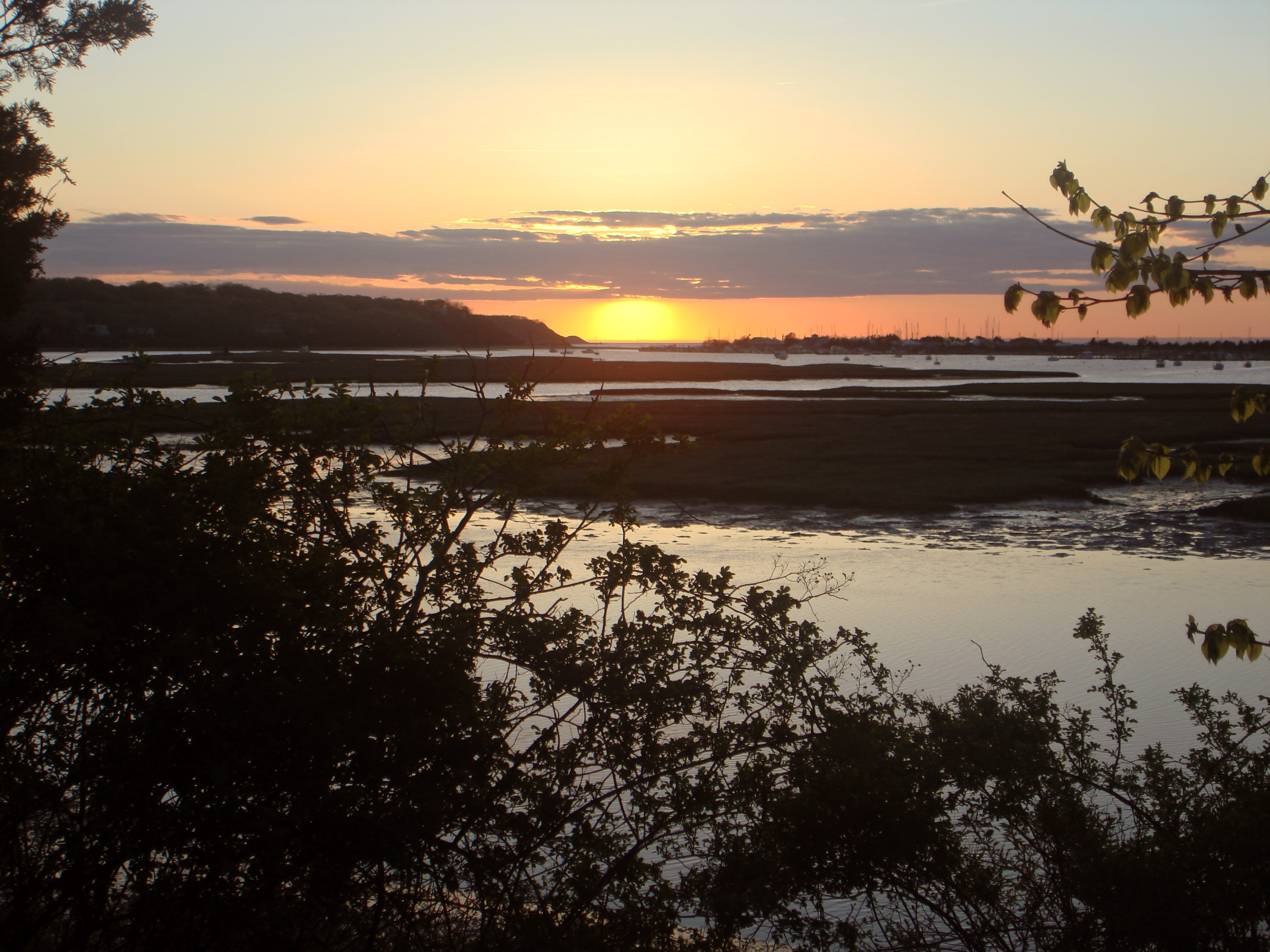
View of Mount Sinai Harbor from the Chandler Estate

This consisted of housing and volunteer workers on a 130-acre (53 ha) plot, with the location being chosen due to its close proximity to St. Charles Hospital in adjacent Port Jefferson.

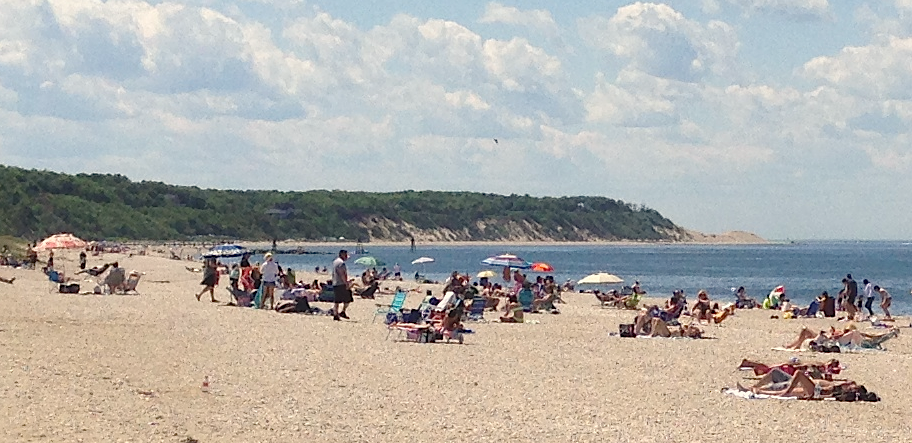
Sunbathers at Cedar Beach

On April 2, 1892, this parcel was sold to Dr. Jerome Walker, who established the Crystal Brook Park Association which is still owned and occupied today by Mount Sinai's oldest private community known as Crystal Brook Park.

Seasonal vacation houses were erected along Mount Sinai Harbor. Cedar Beach, which is located on a peninsula that divides the harbor from the Long Island Sound, became a popular recreational destination. The Chandler Estate, on Mount Sinai Harbor's southern side, was repurposed as vacation cottages and housed Marilyn Monroe and Arthur Miller during their holidays in the 1950s. The property was bought by Suffolk County and preserved as a park in 2001.

=== Suburban growth ===
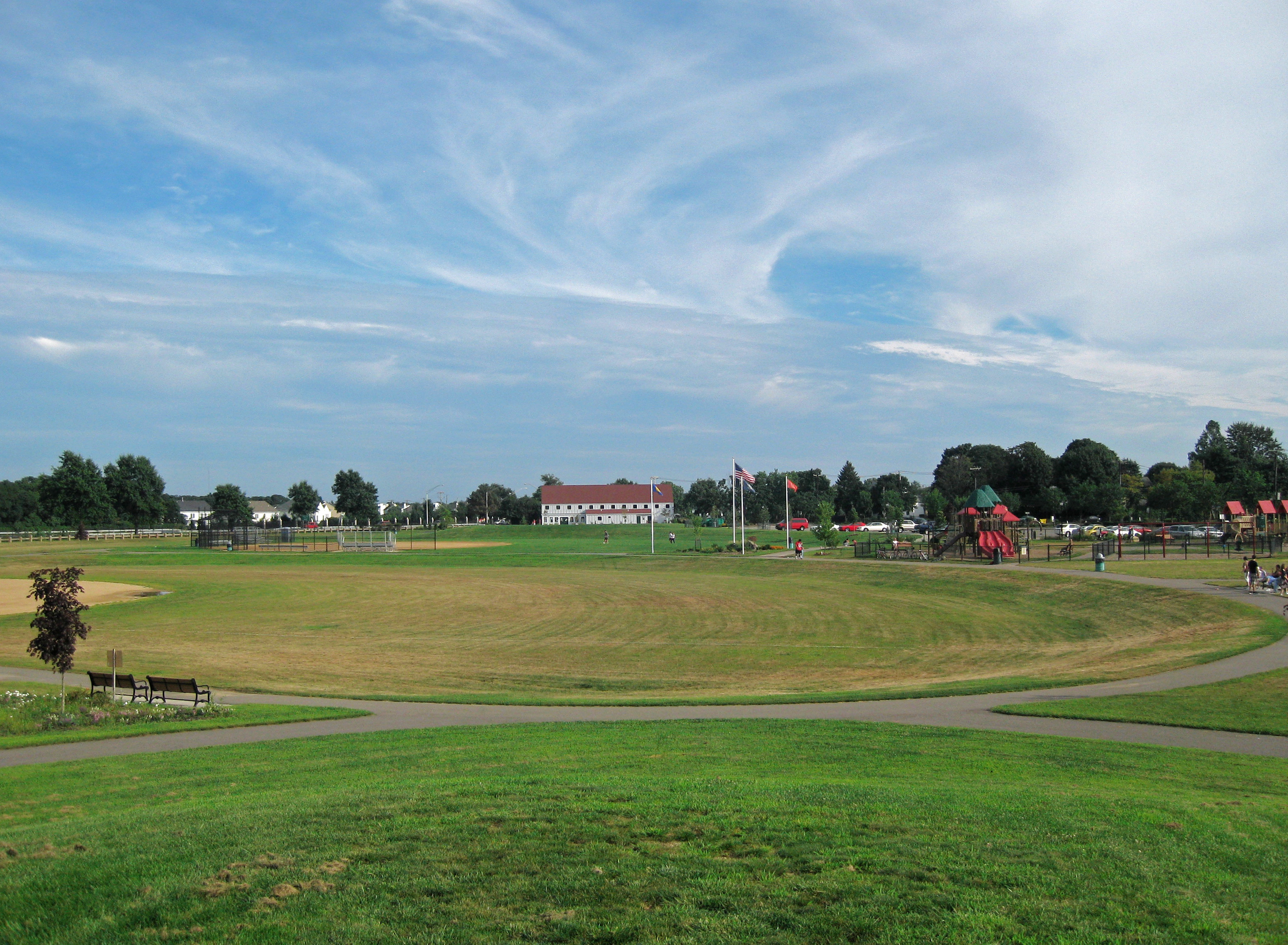
Mount Sinai Heritage Park

In the first half of the 20th century the pace of building slowed. Although large tracts of farmland persisted, there were small pockets of development around the hamlet. Examples of these are the "colony" of homes built off Pipe Stave Hollow Road, both north and south of Route 25A, and the scattered development on Mount Sinai and Chestnut avenues. During this time a community was mapped but never developed just south of Route 25A and east of Crystal Brook Hollow Road.

It was not until the 1960s that housing developments began to occur as suburbanization spread eastward. Lands once farmed were now sold and developed into homes for new residents of Mount Sinai. This included the sale and development of the 404-acre Davis Peach Farm in the first years of the 2000s.

=== Parks ===
There are several community parks in Mt. Sinai including Suffolk County Chandler Estate Park, Little Portion Friary Preserve and the North Shore Heritage Park (aka Mt. Sinai Heritage Park).

== Geography and climate ==
Mount Sinai is located at 40°56′19″N 73°01′07″W (40.938532, -73.018668), bordering Long Island Sound on the North Shore of Long Island. According to the United States Census Bureau, the community has a total area of 6.4 square miles (16.6 km^{2}), of which 6.0 square miles (15.5 km^{2}) is land and 0.42 square miles (1.1 km^{2}), or 6.53%, is water. Mount Sinai is bordered by Port Jefferson to the west, Port Jefferson Station to the southwest, Coram to the south, and Miller Place to the east.

Mount Sinai has a humid subtropical climate (Köppen Cfa). The average temperature throughout the year is 54.7 °F (12.6 °C), with the highest average temperature in July being 75.3 °F (24.1 °C), and January being the coldest month with an average temperature of 33.7 °F (0.9 °C). The annual precipitation is 48.50 inches (1,232 mm).

Climate data for Mount Sinai, NY (1991-2020 normals, extremes 2010−present)
Month	Jan	Feb	Mar	Apr	May	Jun	Jul	Aug	Sep	Oct	Nov	Dec	Year
Record high °F (°C)	71 (22)	68 (20)	79 (26)	90 (32)	93 (34)	93 (34)	97 (36)	96 (36)	94 (34)	91 (33)	82 (28)	71 (22)	97 (36)
Mean daily maximum °F (°C)	41.0 (5.0)	42.9 (6.1)	50.0 (10.0)	63.7 (17.6)	71.7 (22.1)	78.2 (25.7)	83.1 (28.4)	81.8 (27.7)	74.7 (23.7)	64.8 (18.2)	56.0 (13.3)	46.1 (7.8)	62.8 (17.1)
Daily mean °F (°C)	33.7 (0.9)	35.3 (1.8)	41.4 (5.2)	53.2 (11.8)	61.6 (16.4)	69.6 (20.9)	75.3 (24.1)	74.4 (23.6)	68.0 (20.0)	56.8 (13.8)	48.2 (9.0)	39.1 (3.9)	54.7 (12.6)
Mean daily minimum °F (°C)	26.3 (−3.2)	27.8 (−2.3)	32.8 (0.4)	42.8 (6.0)	51.4 (10.8)	61.1 (16.2)	67.5 (19.7)	67.0 (19.4)	61.3 (16.3)	48.8 (9.3)	40.3 (4.6)	32.1 (0.1)	46.6 (8.1)
Record low °F (°C)	−1 (−18)	−3 (−19)	7 (−14)	22 (−6)	35 (2)	38 (3)	52 (11)	46 (8)	41 (5)	30 (−1)	17 (−8)	10 (−12)	−3 (−19)
Average precipitation inches (mm)	3.71 (94)	3.20 (81)	4.65 (118)	4.42 (112)	3.89 (99)	3.93 (100)	3.88 (99)	4.02 (102)	4.30 (109)	4.24 (108)	3.70 (94)	4.56 (116)	48.50 (1,232)
Source: NOAA

=== Mount Sinai Harbor ===
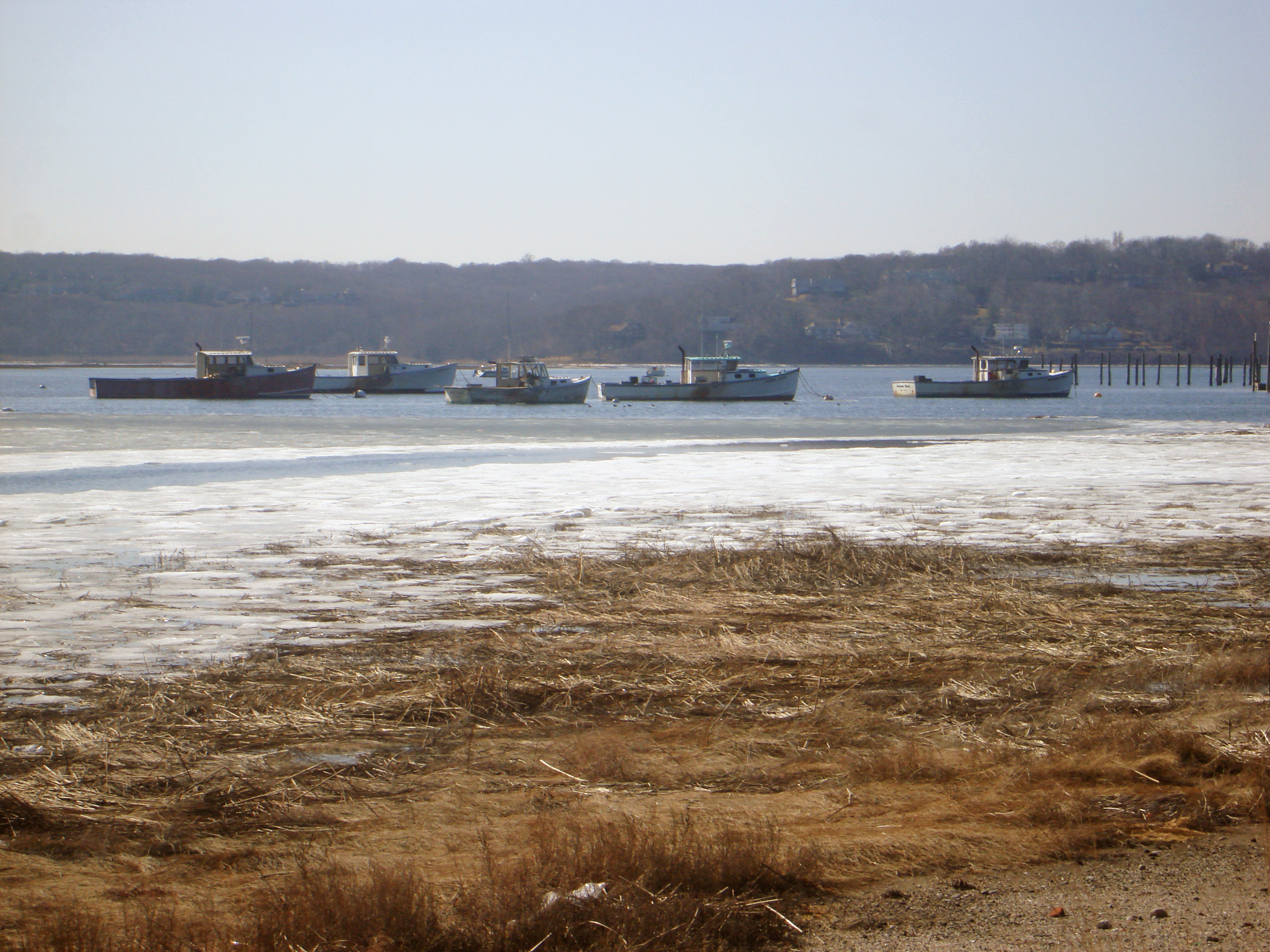
Boats at Mount Sinai Harbor

The northern part of Mount Sinai Harbor borders an active recreation area that is located on a 2-mile long peninsula. This includes Cedar Beach, one of the most popular North Shore beaches during the summer months. A marine sanctuary and nature preserve connects the various sections of Cedar Beach with scenic walking trails and serves to protect the remaining sand dunes. Commonly owned lands set aside in 1664 are being used for public recreation or have been rented for private use by a fishing station, yacht club and boatyard. A number of commercial fishermen work out of the harbor and fish in Long Island Sound. The peninsula, which is most directly accessible from the neighboring community of Miller Place, contains a number of historical vacation houses on both sides of the boundary line. The majority of these houses have since been converted to full-year use.

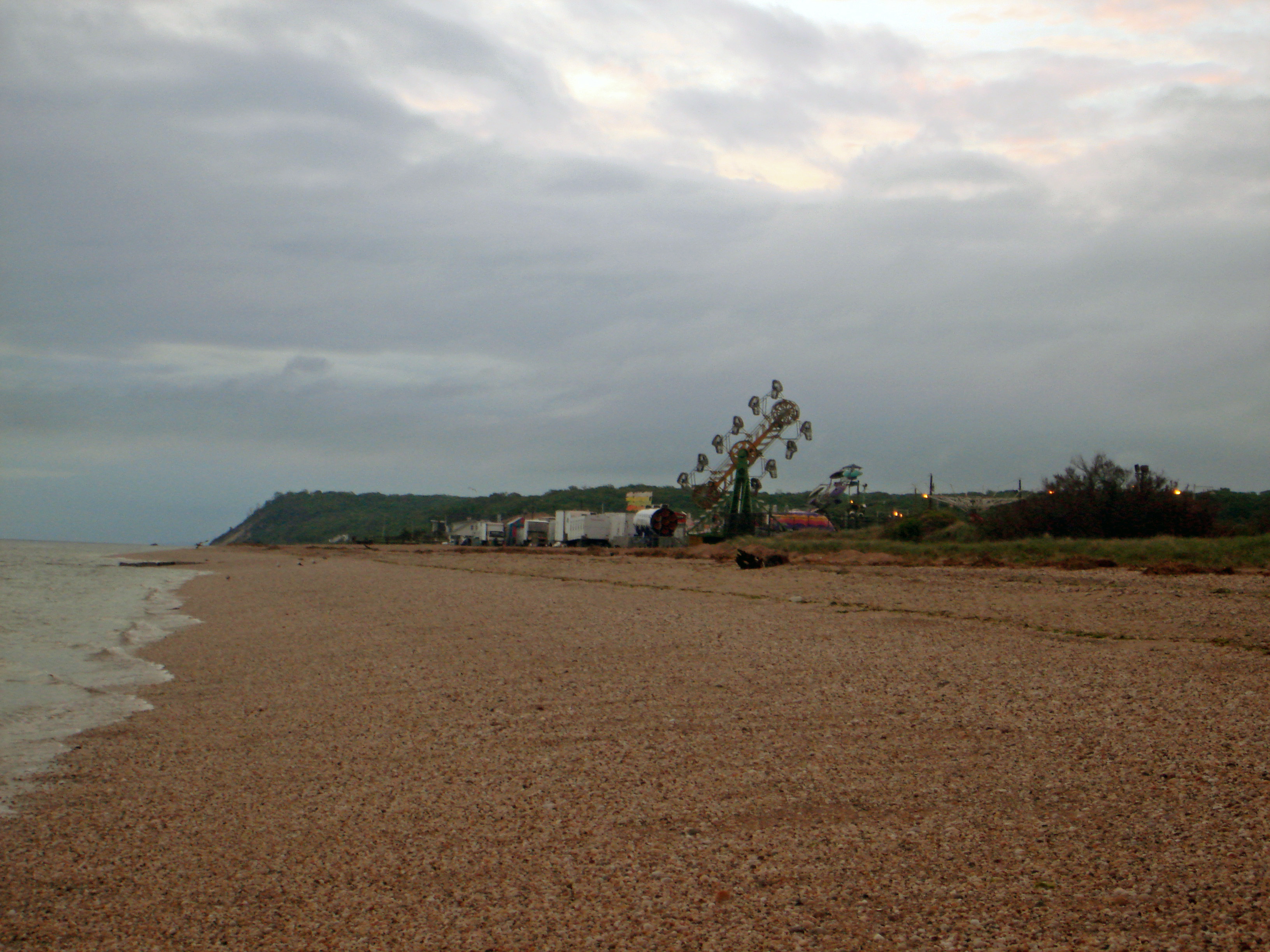
Cedar Beach, at the time of an annual carnival

The southern part of it is a more serene location. Clamming is a popular activity during low tide, as is fishing at high tide. Throughout its history, Mount Sinai Harbor has been utilized for the catching of shellfish, the fishing of snapper and flounder, the hunting of waterfowl, sand milling, and the harvesting of salt hay. Satterly Landing, a small park that once housed a boathouse, provides views across the harbor.

The original mouth of the harbor was on the east side. Winds and tides continually narrowed its opening. Local residents toiled at widening the mouth. In the mid 19th century a new mouth was dredged on the west side of the harbor. Tides continue to dump sand, narrowing the mouth of the harbor. It still must be dredged to keep it open to allow for the boats moored in the harbor to reach the Sound. Three major civic battles were waged in the 20th century when various plans to dredge the harbor were proposed and pursued by the Town of Brookhaven. Two dredging projects were approved, and the present channels and deep basin south of Cedar Beach are the result of that action. A united civic action finally got the dredges out of the harbor in the late 1960s.

Historical population
Census	Pop.	Note	%±
2020	11,623		—
U.S. Decennial Census

== Demographics ==
=== 2020 census ===
As of the 2020 census, Mount Sinai had a population of 11,623. The median age was 46.9 years. 21.0% of residents were under the age of 18 and 23.6% of residents were 65 years of age or older. For every 100 females there were 94.5 males, and for every 100 females age 18 and over there were 92.3 males age 18 and over.

98.0% of residents lived in urban areas, while 2.0% lived in rural areas.

There were 4,131 households in Mount Sinai, of which 31.7% had children under the age of 18 living in them. Of all households, 66.8% were married-couple households, 9.2% were households with a male householder and no spouse or partner present, and 19.8% were households with a female householder and no spouse or partner present. About 18.4% of all households were made up of individuals and 12.0% had someone living alone who was 65 years of age or older.

There were 4,339 housing units, of which 4.8% were vacant. The homeowner vacancy rate was 1.3% and the rental vacancy rate was 2.7%.

Racial composition as of the 2020 census
Race	Number	Percent
White	9,878	85.0%
Black or African American	165	1.4%
American Indian and Alaska Native	27	0.2%
Asian	602	5.2%
Native Hawaiian and Other Pacific Islander	1	0.0%
Some other race	210	1.8%
Two or more races	740	6.4%
Hispanic or Latino (of any race)	984	8.5%

=== 2010 census ===
As of the 2010 census, there were 12,118 residents, 4,080 households, and 3,391 families residing in Mount Sinai. The racial makeup of the CDP was 92.07% White, 1.5% Black or African American, 0.15% American Indian and Alaska Native, 4.0% Asian, 0.07% Native Hawaiian and Other Pacific Islander, and 1.3% from two or more races. Hispanic or Latino of any race were 5.8% of the population. The average household size was 2.96 and the average family size was 3.26. The median age was 41.9.

=== 2000 census ===
There were 2,671 households, out of which 46.4% had children under the age of 18 living with them, 76.7% were married couples living together, 6.6% had a female householder with no husband present, and 14.5% were non-families. 11.8% of all households were made up of individuals, and 7.0% had someone living alone who was 65 years of age or older. The average household size was 3.26 and the average family size was 3.54.

In the CDP, the population was spread out, with 30.0% under the age of 18, 7.2% from 18 to 24, 29.0% from 25 to 44, 24.8% from 45 to 64, and 9.0% who were 65 years of age or older. The median age was 36 years. For every 100 females, there were 95.4 males. For every 100 females age 18 and over, there were 96.0 males.

The median income for a household in the CDP was $85,605, and the median income for a family was $89,636. Males had a median income of $62,093 versus $36,415 for females. The per capita income for the CDP was $31,131. About 1.8% of families and 3.6% of the population were below the poverty threshold, including 3.9% of those under age 18 and 2.1% of those age 65 or over.

== Education ==
For parts of its history, residents lacked sufficient school facilities and sent their children to the neighboring Port Jefferson School District. However, two new school buildings constructed in 1966 and 1978 enabled students through grade 9 to remain in Mount Sinai. Mount Sinai High School opened to students in September 1991. All three schools of the Mount Sinai School District are located on a single shared campus.

== Notable people ==
- Lionel Barrymore, actor of stage, screen and radio, rented a summer home in Mount Sinai
- Ritchie Blackmore, guitarist for Deep Purple and Rainbow lives in Mount Sinai
- Sam Faber, an ice hockey player, was born in Mount Sinai
- Dawn Powell, novelist, playwright, screenwriter, and short story writer, rented a summer home in Mount Sinai
- Norman Rosten, poet, playwright, and novelist, rented a summer home in Mount Sinai
- Trent Beretta, professional wrestler, was born in Mount Sinai
