= Cedar Beach (Brookhaven, New York) =

Geography and History of Cedar Beach, Long Island, New York

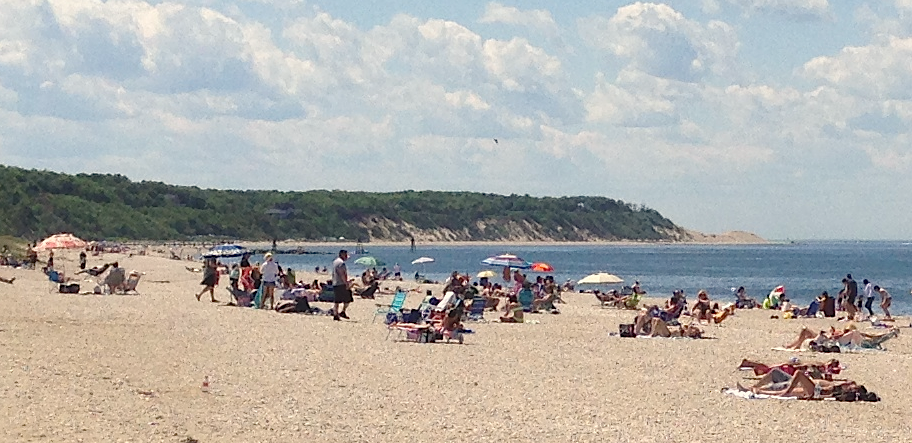
- Sunbathers on the main section of Cedar Beach
- Interactive map of Cedar Beach
- Location: Mount Sinai, New York
- Coordinates: 40°57′53″N 73°01′47″W
- Operator: Brookhaven, New York

Cedar Beach is a public beach on the North Shore of Long Island, located within the Town of Brookhaven in Suffolk County, New York. The beach itself spans 3,450 feet on a peninsula that divides Mount Sinai Harbor from the Long Island Sound. Cedar Beach is located in the hamlet of Mount Sinai, while the peninsula on which it sits is accessed most directly from the adjacent hamlet of Miller Place.

== Geography ==
Cedar Beach is located on a peninsula that stretches for over a mile westward, with the Long Island Sound to its north and Mount Sinai Harbor to its south. The peninsula contains two popular sections of recreational beach, Cedar Beach Main and Cedar Beach West, united along a continuous beachfront and adjacent nature preserve.

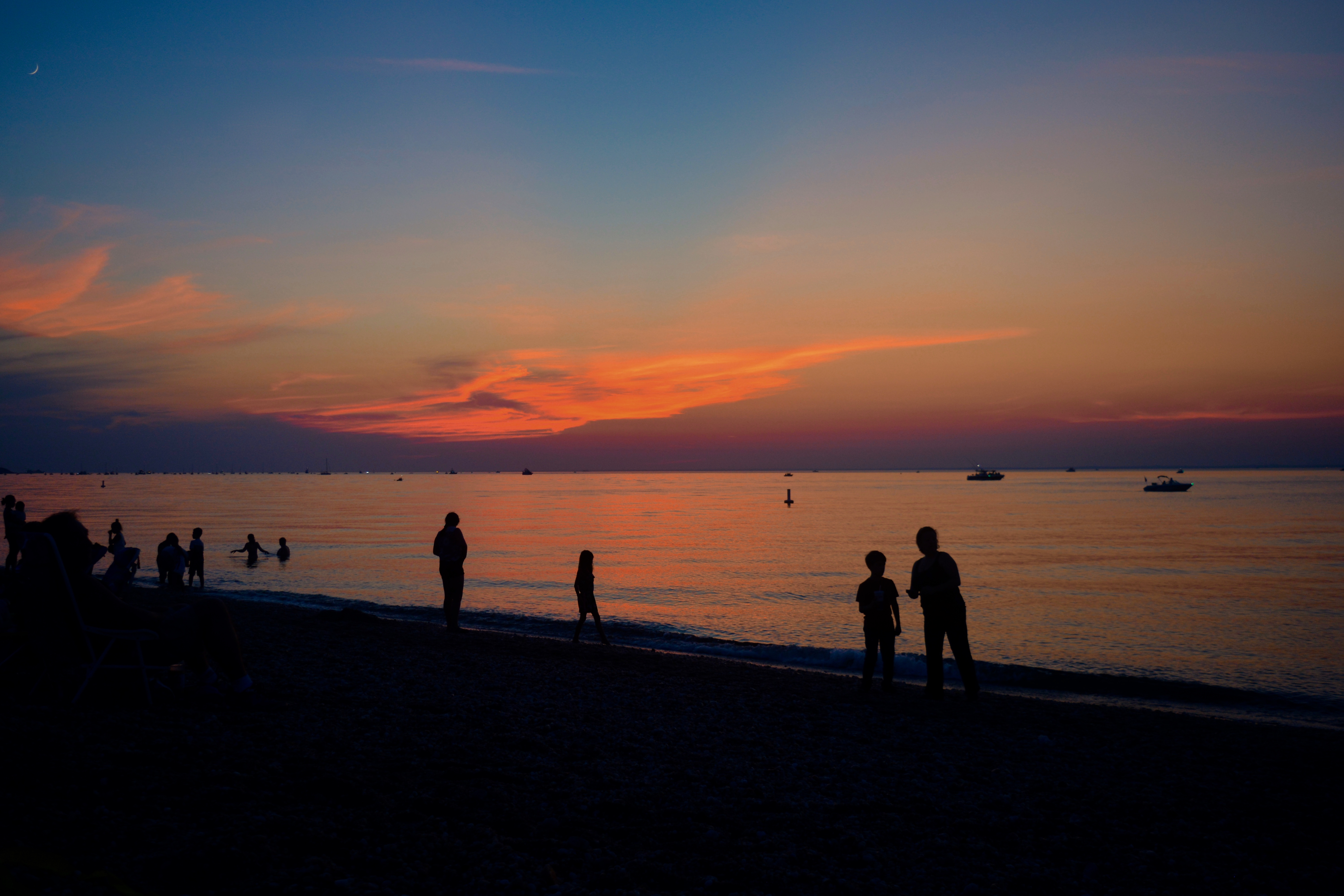
At sunset, by Joe Maddalone

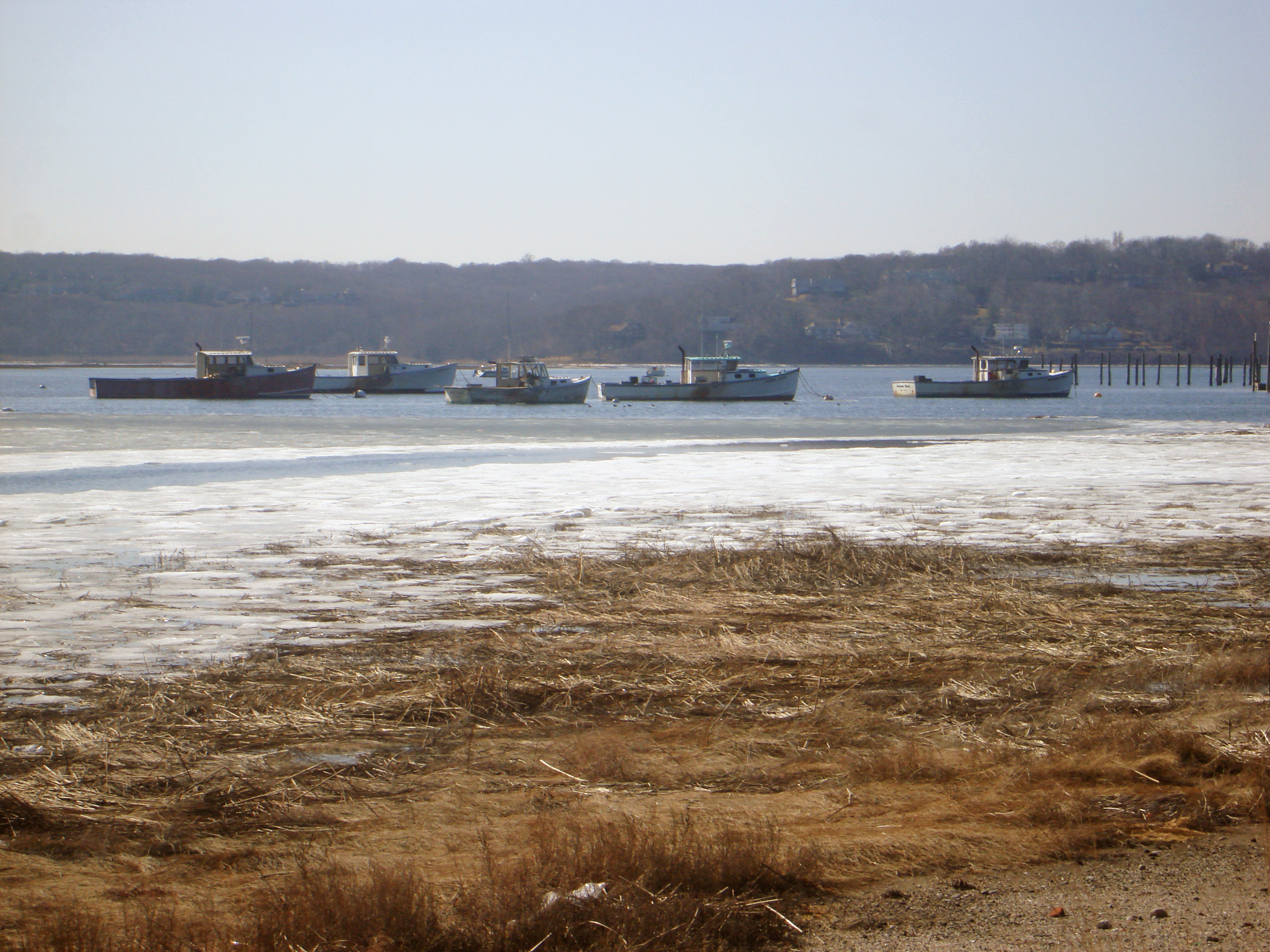
Boats in Mount Sinai Harbor

Cedar Beach Main is typically the most lively section of Cedar Beach and is located near its eastern entrance and the main parking areas. It includes a restaurant, bar, snack stand, restrooms, lifeguard stations, and volleyball courts. Live music performances take place in near the restaurant during the summer months.

Cedar Beach West is located at the peninsula's western end, overlooking the Mount Misery Point section of Port Jefferson. This sections contains a popular fishing pier. Nearer to Cedar Beach's western end is a boat launch ramp and marina, with the Mount Sinai Yacht Club located on the peninsula.

=== Nature preserve ===
Connecting these sections behind the continuous beachfront is a nature preserve, which includes a paved walkway and a wooden pavilion overlooking the beach. Within the preserve is the Cedar Beach Nature Center, an educational center focused on the local marine biome with hands-on exhibits and local wildlife.

== History ==
=== Origins ===
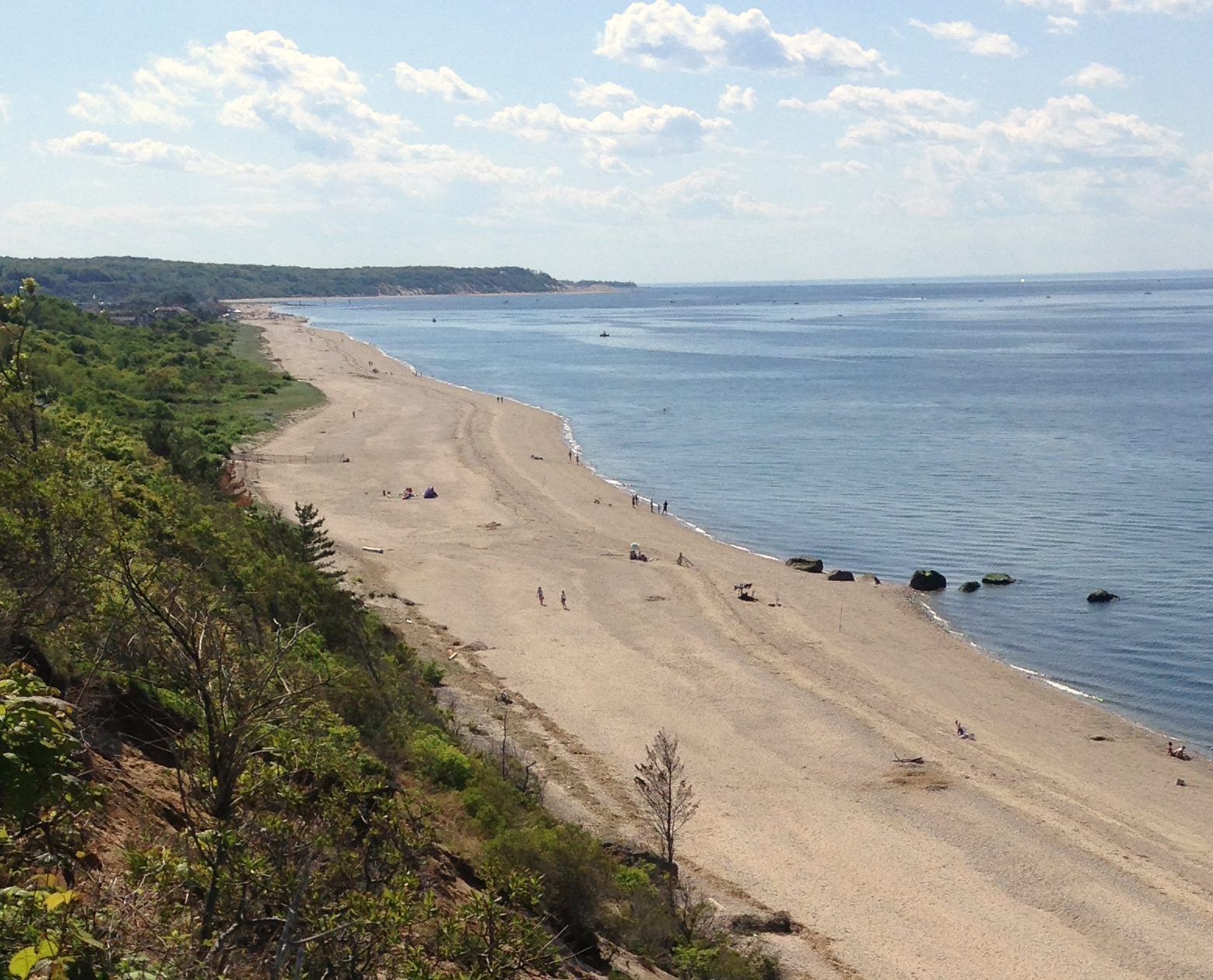
View toward Cedar Beach from the adjacent beaches in Miller Place

Prior in the mid-19th century, the mouth of Mount Sinai Harbor was on at its eastern side, with the peninsula on which Cedar Beach now sits being accessible from Port Jefferson. When tides and winds closed the harbor's opening, a new mouth was opened on its west side, switching the peninsula's connection from Port Jefferson to Miller Place. Dredging projects were active in Mount Sinai Harbor until the 1960s.

During the Revolutionary War, Cedar Beach was the landing site of Major Benjamin Tallmadge and his detachment of Continental Army dragoons during a successful raid on British forces. Tallmadge and his men journeyed southbound from Cedar Beach along Pipestave Hollow and went on to capture and burn Manor St. George, a British stronghold located in what is currently Mastic Beach. The route of Tallmadge's march from Cedar Beach to Manor St. George is commemorated as the Benjamin Tallmadge Historic Trail.

=== Modern recreational use ===
Cedar Beach has been a popular recreational area since the expansion of the Long Island Rail Road to neighboring Port Jefferson in 1873 (and temporarily to Mount Sinai from 1895-1939). Marilyn Monroe and Arthur Miller spent time at Cedar Beach during the 1950s. In the latter half of the 20th century with the rise of suburbia, many of the summer homes near Cedar Beach were converted to full-time use. Occasionally, traveling carnivals use the parking lot. Suffolk County Department of Public Works once planned to build a spur from Patchogue-Mount Sinai Road to the beach.

Cedar Beach also has a marina, and campsites nearby offer seasonal recreational boating and camping. The marina offers boat slips to residents and the nearby campgrounds attract families for summer weekends — in particular for those with houseboats. The camping facility offers picnic grounds, restrooms, and some fishing piers to the Long Island Sound.
