= Jonathan Scott =

Jonathan Scott may refer to:

- Jonathan Scott (orientalist) (1754–1829), English linguist and translator
- Jonathan Scott (zoologist) (born 1949), wildlife photographer, zoologist and host of BBC's Big Cat Diary
- Jonathan Scott (politician) (born 1966), Rhode Island Republican politician, who ran for US Congress in 2006
- Jonathan Scott (television personality) (born 1978), Canadian television personality
- Jonathan Scott (actor), British actor (born 1973)
- Jonathan Scott (American football) (born 1983), American football offensive tackle
- Jon Scott (born 1958), American news anchor

== See also ==
- John Scott (disambiguation)
