= Results of the 1990 Australian federal election in South Australia =

1990 Australian federal election (South Australia)
- 24 March 1990

All 13 South Australian seats in the Australian House of Representatives and 6 seats in the Australian Senate
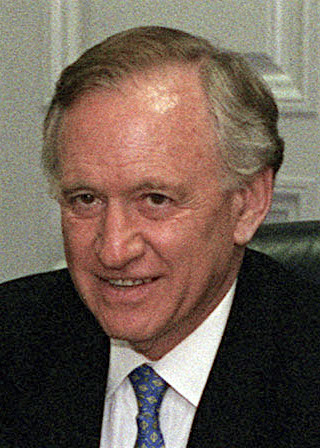

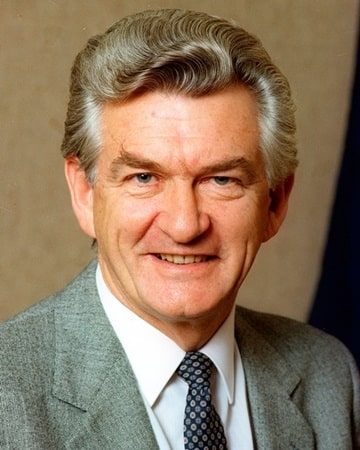
	First party	Second party
Leader	Andrew Peacock	Bob Hawke
Party	Liberal/National coalition	Labor
Last election	5 seats	8 seats
Seats won	6 seats	7 seats
Seat change	▲1	▼1
Popular vote	381,172	339,218
Percentage	42.6%	38.0%
Swing	▲0.1	▼6.6
TPP	50.5%	49.5%
TPP swing	▲0.7	▼0.7

This is a list of electoral division results for the Australian 1990 federal election in the state of South Australia.

== Overall results ==
Turnout 96.0% (CV) — Informal 3.7%
Party	Votes	%	Swing	Seats	Change
Liberal	381,172	42.65	+0.14	6	▲1
Labor	339,218	37.95	-6.60	7	▼1
Democrats	135,546	15.17	+7.38		
Call to Australia	22,297	2.49			
Independents	8,104	0.91	0.02		
Grey Power	3,907	0.44			
Greens	1,878	0.21			
Democratic Socialist	1,632	0.18			
Total	893,754			13	
Two-party-preferred vote
Labor	441,659	49.5	-0.7	7	▼1
Liberal/National Coalition	450.503	50.5	+0.7	6	▲1
Invalid/blank votes	34,143	3.68	-3.16		
Turnout	927,897	96.01			
Registered voters	966,431				
Source: Federal Elections 1990

== Results by division ==
=== Adelaide ===
1990 Australian federal election: Adelaide
Party	Candidate	Votes	%	±%
Labor	Bob Catley	27,422	40.5	−8.4
Liberal	Mike Pratt	26,953	39.8	+4.3
Democrats	Peter Mann	9,197	13.6	+4.5
Greens	Keith Oehme	1,878	2.8	+2.8
Call to Australia	Cathryn Linedale	1,123	1.7	+1.7
Independent	Jean Booth	1,100	1.6	+1.6
Total formal votes		67,673	96.1	
Informal votes		2,771	3.9	
Turnout		70,444	95.7	
Two-party-preferred result
Labor	Bob Catley	36,267	53.7	−2.8
Liberal	Mike Pratt	31,273	46.3	+2.8
Labor gain from Liberal		Swing	−2.8	

=== Barker ===
1990 Australian federal election: Barker
Party	Candidate	Votes	%	±%
Liberal	Ian McLachlan	39,470	57.8	+5.6
Labor	Bill Hender	19,865	29.1	−4.2
Democrats	Mark Lobban	6,730	9.9	+4.3
Independent	Pieter Raams	2,211	3.2	+3.2
Total formal votes		68,276	97.0	
Informal votes		2,087	3.0	
Turnout		70,363	96.5	
Two-party-preferred result
Liberal	Ian McLachlan	43,388	63.6	+2.0
Labor	Bill Hender	24,841	36.4	−2.0
Liberal hold		Swing	+2.0	

=== Bonython ===
1990 Australian federal election: Bonython
Party	Candidate	Votes	%	±%
Labor	Neal Blewett	36,326	52.1	−9.2
Liberal	Natalie Richardson	18,216	26.2	+1.9
Democrats	Colin Maas	12,782	18.3	+8.8
Call to Australia	Bruce Hannaford	2,334	3.4	+3.4
Total formal votes		69,658	95.0	
Informal votes		3,635	5.0	
Turnout		73,293	96.0	
Two-party-preferred result
Labor	Neal Blewett	45,837	65.9	−2.2
Liberal	Natalie Richardson	23,722	34.1	+2.2
Labor hold		Swing	−2.2	

=== Boothby ===
1990 Australian federal election: Boothby
Party	Candidate	Votes	%	±%
Liberal	Steele Hall	36,010	51.4	−2.7
Labor	Michael Keenan	18,404	26.3	−5.8
Democrats	Margaret-Ann Williams	12,796	18.3	+8.3
Call to Australia	Bruce Byrne	1,515	2.2	+2.2
Independent	Colin Banks	1,300	1.9	+1.9
Total formal votes		70,025	97.7	
Informal votes		1,661	2.3	
Turnout		71,686	95.6	
Two-party-preferred result
Liberal	Steele Hall	42,409	60.7	−0.9
Labor	Michael Keenan	27,421	39.3	+0.9
Liberal hold		Swing	−0.9	

=== Grey ===
1990 Australian federal election: Grey
Party	Candidate	Votes	%	±%
Labor	Lloyd O'Neil	30,600	47.7	−4.2
Liberal	Jonathan Man	22,601	35.2	−0.1
Call to Australia	Ern Heyne	5,006	7.8	+7.8
Democrats	Harm Folkers	4,608	7.2	+1.9
Independent	Peter Clark	904	1.4	+1.4
Independent	John Fisher	414	0.6	+0.6
Total formal votes		64,133	96.7	
Informal votes		2,176	3.3	
Turnout		66,309	95.1	
Two-party-preferred result
Labor	Lloyd O'Neil	36,169	56.5	+0.7
Liberal	Jonathan Man	27,852	43.5	−0.7
Labor hold		Swing	+0.7	

=== Hawker ===
1990 Australian federal election: Hawker
Party	Candidate	Votes	%	±%
Liberal	Chris Gallus	28,348	43.1	−0.8
Labor	Elizabeth Harvey	26,641	40.5	−5.7
Democrats	Elizabeth Williams	8,362	12.7	+5.8
Call to Australia	Reg Macey	1,266	1.9	+1.9
Grey Power	Glen Bottam	702	1.1	+1.1
Democratic Socialist	Kathy Ragless	477	0.7	+0.7
Total formal votes		65,796	96.7	
Informal votes		2,270	3.3	
Turnout		68,066	95.8	
Two-party-preferred result
Liberal	Chris Gallus	32,845	50.0	−1.2
Labor	Elizabeth Harvey	32,831	50.0	+1.2
Liberal gain from Labor		Swing	+1.2	

=== Hindmarsh ===
1990 Australian federal election: Hindmarsh
Party	Candidate	Votes	%	±%
Labor	John Scott	29,212	43.8	−5.2
Liberal	Barry Lewis	24,836	37.3	−0.6
Democrats	Stephen Crabbe	9,070	13.6	+5.3
Grey Power	John Maguire	1,848	2.8	+2.8
Call to Australia	Peter Sparrow	1,072	1.6	+1.6
Independent	Alan McCarthy	418	0.6	+0.6
Independent	David Moxham	178	0.3	+0.3
Total formal votes		66,634	94.9	
Informal votes		3,558	5.1	
Turnout		70,192	95.6	
Two-party-preferred result
Labor	John Scott	36,801	55.3	+0.2
Liberal	Barry Lewis	29,717	44.7	−0.2
Labor hold		Swing	+0.2	

=== Kingston ===
1990 Australian federal election: Kingston
Party	Candidate	Votes	%	±%
Labor	Gordon Bilney	26,206	37.1	−11.2
Liberal	Judy Fuller	23,355	33.0	−5.5
Democrats	Janine Haines	18,694	26.4	+17.1
Call to Australia	Cliff Boyd	1,533	2.2	+2.2
Independent	George Gater	327	0.5	+0.5
Independent	Lyall McDonald	304	0.4	+0.4
Democratic Socialist	Tom Flanagan	296	0.4	+0.4
Total formal votes		70,715	96.6	
Informal votes		2,507	3.4	
Turnout		73,222	96.6	
Two-party-preferred result
Labor	Gordon Bilney	38,824	55.0	+0.2
Liberal	Judy Fuller	31,722	45.0	−0.2
Labor hold		Swing	+0.2	

=== Makin ===
1990 Australian federal election: Makin
Party	Candidate	Votes	%	±%
Labor	Peter Duncan	28,529	40.8	−6.5
Liberal	Daryl Hicks	27,462	39.3	−0.1
Democrats	Steve Bartholomew	10,619	15.2	+6.2
Call to Australia	Jeff Penny	2,320	3.3	+3.3
Independent	Geoff Roberts	639	0.9	+0.9
Independent	David Howard	309	0.4	+0.4
Total formal votes		69,878	96.2	
Informal votes		2,775	3.8	
Turnout		72,653	96.8	
Two-party-preferred result
Labor	Peter Duncan	36,573	52.4	−1.0
Liberal	Daryl Hicks	33,197	47.6	+1.0
Labor hold		Swing	−1.0	

=== Mayo ===
1990 Australian federal election: Mayo
Party	Candidate	Votes	%	±%
Liberal	Alexander Downer	39,037	52.5	−1.5
Labor	Delia Skorin	17,584	23.6	−6.7
Democrats	Merilyn Pedrick	15,817	21.3	+11.7
Call to Australia	John Watson	1,937	2.6	+2.6
Total formal votes		74,375	96.9	
Informal votes		2,359	3.1	
Turnout		76,734	96.2	
Two-party-preferred result
Liberal	Alexander Downer	45,737	61.6	−1.1
Labor	Delia Skorin	28,479	38.4	+1.1
Liberal hold		Swing	−1.1	

=== Port Adelaide ===
1990 Australian federal election: Port Adelaide
Party	Candidate	Votes	%	±%
Labor	Rod Sawford	36,186	53.5	−7.8
Liberal	Howard Trotter	21,539	31.9	+3.3
Democrats	Damien Aidon	8,003	11.8	+5.7
Call to Australia	Peter Thompson	1,013	1.5	+1.5
Democratic Socialist	Paul Petit	859	1.3	+1.3
Total formal votes		67,600	95.4	
Informal votes		3,275	4.6	
Turnout		70,875	96.0	
Two-party-preferred result
Labor	Rod Sawford	42,718	63.3	−3.0
Liberal	Howard Trotter	24,780	36.7	+3.0
Labor hold		Swing	−3.0	

=== Sturt ===
1990 Australian federal election: Sturt
Party	Candidate	Votes	%	±%
Liberal	Ian Wilson	33,129	49.6	−1.7
Labor	Mark Hough	21,278	31.9	−6.2
Democrats	Arlyn Tombleson	9,989	15.0	+6.7
Grey Power	Elena Bulis	1,357	2.0	+2.0
Call to Australia	Tom Curnow	1,034	1.5	+1.5
Total formal votes		66,787	96.0	
Informal votes		2,782	4.0	
Turnout		69,569	95.9	
Two-party-preferred result
Liberal	Ian Wilson	38,493	57.7	+1.1
Labor	Mark Hough	28,162	42.3	−1.1
Liberal hold		Swing	+1.1	

=== Wakefield ===
1990 Australian federal election: Wakefield
Party	Candidate	Votes	%	±%
Liberal	Neil Andrew	40,216	55.7	−0.1
Labor	George Karzis	20,965	29.0	−4.0
Democrats	Kaye Matthews	8,879	12.3	+8.2
Call to Australia	Ashley Grace	2,144	3.0	+3.0
Total formal votes		72,204	96.9	
Informal votes		2,287	3.1	
Turnout		74,491	96.4	
Two-party-preferred result
Liberal	Neil Andrew	45,378	62.9	−0.8
Labor	George Karzis	26,736	37.1	+0.8
Liberal hold		Swing	−0.8	

== See also ==
- Results of the 1990 Australian federal election (House of Representatives)
- Members of the Australian House of Representatives, 1990–1993
