= Elizabeth Harvey =

Elizabeth Harvey may refer to:

- Elizabeth Harvey (politician), an Australian politician
- Elizabeth Harvey (historian), a British historian
- Elizabeth Harvey (19th-century painter), an English artist
