= Jack Scott =

Jack Scott may refer to:

== Sports ==
- Jack Scott (American football) (1928–2014), college football and basketball coach in the United States
- Jack Scott (Australian rules footballer) (1915–1997), Australian football player
- Jack Scott (baseball) (1892–1959), American baseball player
- John Scott (cricket and rugby league) (1888–1964), Australian cricketer and rugby league player, often called Jack Scott
- Jack Scott (footballer, born 1875) (1875–1931), English footballer with Blackpool
- Jack Scott (footballer, born 1905) (1905–1976), English footballer with Doncaster Rovers, Norwich City and Southampton
- Jack Scott (speedway rider) (1934–2020), Australian speedway rider

== Politicians ==
- Jack Scott (California politician) (born 1933), California state senator
- Jack Scott (New Zealand politician) (1916–2001), New Zealand politician of the National Party

== Others ==
- Jack Scott (activist) (1910–2000), Irish born union activist in Canada; World War II croix de guerre recipient
- Jack Scott (meteorologist) (1923–2008), former BBC Weather presenter and meteorologist
- Jack Scott (singer) (1936–2019), Canadian singer and songwriter
- Jack Scott (sports activist) (1942–2000), American sportswriter and activist
- Jack Hardiman Scott (1920–1999), British journalist and broadcaster
- Alan Scott (RAF officer) (1883–1922), known as Jack, New Zealand-born First World War squadron commander and flying ace
- Jack Scott, the name of the disc jockey in the stage version of High School Musical

== See also ==
- Jackie Scott (1933–1978), English footballer
- John Scott (disambiguation)
