= Dorothea Gotherson =

English Quaker preacher and writer

- Born: baptised in 1611 baptised in Kent
- Writing career
- Genre: religious

Dorothea Gotherson (born baptised in 1611) was an English Quaker preacher and writer.

== Life ==
Gotherson was baptised in 1611 in Godmersham in Kent. She was the last of the children born to Mary Knatchbull and Thomas Scott. Her father had a daughter from a previous marriage. He was a member of parliament who in 1596 had inherited a large estate in Godmersham in Kent. Her mother died when she was a child and her father died in 1635 and she was his heir. In that year she married parliamentarian and later MP Major John Gotherson.

She and her husband both became Quakers and Dorothea lead "Scott's congregation" named for her family name. Gotherson looked after this group and would preach to them. In 1660 "An alarm to all priests, judges, magistrates, souldiers, and all people; inviting them to repentance and amendment of life..etc" was published by her husband. The publication names him as the author but it is suspected that they wrote it together.

In 1661 she wrote, published and dedicated "To All that are Unregenerated, a Call to Repentence" to Charles II. The work is in strong support of the King and she encourages her readers to support him.

She and her husband met adventurer Captain John Scott. Dorothea came from the Scott family of which John Scott had questionable claims of membership. Prior to his return to America, John Scott persuaded the Gothersons to give him two thousand pounds in return for vast lands in Long Island. In later years it would be found that the sale was a hoax. Dorothea petitioned the King and in time Samuel Pepys would take a deposition from her. No formal charges were made against Scott for this crime.
