= Johnny Scott =

Johnny Scott may refer to:

- Johnny Scott (Canadian football) (born 1969), defensive lineman in the Canadian Football League
- Johnny Scott (jazz musician), jazz vocalist and tenor saxophonist
- John Scott (composer) (born 1940), British composer (of inter alia the theme music to Nationwide) and conductor
- Johnny Scott (musician), guitarist, vocalist and arranger, best known for his work with Van Morrison
- Sir John Scott, 5th Baronet, natural historian, broadcaster, columnist, countryside campaigner and farmer

== See also ==
- John Scott (disambiguation)
