= John Scott (MP for York) =

Member of the England Parliament for York
- Preceded by: Sir Thomas Widdrington; Sir Metcalfe Robinson
- Succeeded by: Sir Thomas Osborne; Sir Metcalfe Robinson

Personal details
- Died: 1664

John Scott was one of two Members of the Parliament of England representing the constituency of York from 1661 to 1664.

== Life and politics ==
The son of John Scott, Dean of York Minster, John was educated at Christ's College, Cambridge. His father is reported to have died a debtors' prison, which led to hardships for his son.

He was a major in the Royalist Army during the English Civil War. He served in the Spanish Army between 1656 and 1658. He became a freeman of the city of York in 1661. He was returned as MP for the city in 1661. This was in place of the expected candidate, Sir Thomas Widdrington.

Scott died in the autumn of 1664.

Political offices
Preceded by Sir Thomas Widdrington; Sir Metcalfe Robinson	Member of Parliament; 1661-1664	Next: Sir Thomas Osborne; Sir Metcalfe Robinson
