= John Scott (1920s footballer) =

Scottish footballer

John Scott MM (born c. 1889) was a Scottish footballer whose regular position was wing half. Born in Wishaw or Motherwell, he played for Hamilton Academical, Bradford Park Avenue, Manchester United and St Mirren. Scott was awarded a Military Medal during the First World War.
