= John Scott (Royal Navy officer) =

Warrant officer in the Royal Navy

- Born: 1764; Floods Farm, near Spey Bay
- Died: 1805 (aged 40–41); Battle of Trafalgar
- Military career
- Allegiance: United Kingdom
- Branch: Royal Navy
- Rank: Purser

John Scott (1764 – 21 October 1805) was a warrant officer in the Royal Navy. He was a friend and confidant to Lord Nelson and served as his secretary in HMS Victory. He was present at the Battle of Trafalgar during which he was killed in the opening exchanges.

Not much is known about Scott but letters kept by Lady Hamilton indicate that they knew each other well. Scott gave Emma news of Nelson and she in turn appears to have taken his wife under her wing. It was through her that he learnt of the birth of his son shortly after leaving England. Scott also spent time with Nelson and Emma at their home, Merton, during a brief spell of shore leave in the summer of 1805.

Scott served as purser of HMS Royal Sovereign before transferring to Victory in May 1803, a transfer that Nelson specifically requested. They served together throughout the long campaign that culminated in the Battle of Trafalgar; a battle that claimed the lives of them both. Assisted by a small team of clerks, John Scott acted as Nelson's principal secretary, dealing with most of the public correspondence. Foreign and confidential mail was handled by Victory's chaplain, the Rev. Alexander Scott.

Just prior to the Battle of Trafalgar, Victory's surgeon William Beatty was one of the many officers concerned by the conspicuous dress of Lord Nelson. It was Scott who advised Beatty to keep his thoughts to himself, remarking, "Take care doctor, what you are about. I would not be the man to mention such a matter to him".

At Trafalgar, Scott was stationed on the quarterdeck of Victory, next to Nelson. It would have been his job to record the battle but one of the first cannonballs to reach Victory cut him in half, killing him immediately. When Captain Adair of the marines and a seaman rushed forward to remove the corpse, Nelson asked, "Is that poor Scott that is gone?" Adair nodded. "Poor Scott", Nelson added.

The body was thrown overboard, as was the custom, but the not inconsiderable amount of blood remained on the deck. When Nelson was shot an hour and half later he fell on the same spot and thus the blood that stained his breeches, now displayed in the National Maritime Museum, was Scott's not Nelson's as so often is supposed.

Nelson clearly valued Scott, writing in a testimonial, "...as a secretary for ability, punctuality and regularity I believe your superior is not to be met with".

He was survived by a son John Francis Scott (16 October 1796 – 16 December 1854).
