= John Scott (footballer, born 1942) =

English footballer

Personal information
- Date of birth: 2 January 1942 (age 84)
- Place of birth: Normanton, England
- Position: Inside forward

Senior career*
Years	Team	Apps	(Gls)
1961–1963	Bradford City	11	(2)
1963–1964	Chesterfield	5	(0)
- Matlock Town
Total		16	(2)
- * Club domestic league appearances and goals

John Scott (born 2 January 1942) is an English former professional footballer who played as an inside forward.

== Career ==
Born in Normanton, Scott played for Bradford City, Chesterfield and Matlock Town.
