= John R. Scott Sr. =

American politician

Reverend John R. Scott, Sr.
- Pastor
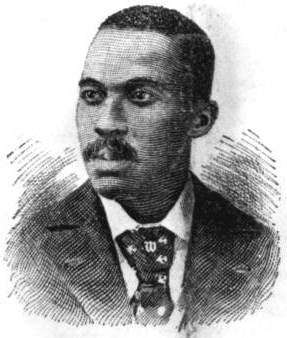
- Church: St. Paul African Methodist Episcopal Church, Jacksonville, Florida
- Other posts: Member, Florida House of Representatives; President, Edward Waters College

Personal details
- Born: 1840-41 (estimated) Virginia (born a slave)
- Died: February 18, 1929 Jacksonville, Florida
- Buried: Memorial Cemetery, Jacksonville, Florida
- Denomination: African Methodist Episcopal
- Residence: Jacksonville, Florida
- Spouse: Emily Jane Scott (married Duval County, FL, September 7, 1868)
- Children: Thomas D., John H, Rachael A V, Mary A C, Patrick G
- Occupation: Minister, politician, college president
- Profession: Minister
- Education: Doctor of Divinity

Reverend John Robert Scott Sr. (1840-41 – February 18, 1929) was a religious and political leader in Florida as well as a college president. He was born into slavery in Virginia. During the Reconstruction era he became a pastor in the African Methodist Episcopal (A.M.E.) Church and a state legislator.

He was chosen in 1870 as the first pastor of St. Paul African Methodist Episcopal Church of Jacksonville, Florida. He also served in the Florida House of Representatives, representing Jacksonville, from 1868 to 1873 and again in 1879. He was a leading politician in Jacksonville during the Reconstruction Era and a member of the City Council; his group "once [1872] had so many representatives in the city government that the entire form of government was changed by an executive act in Tallahassee". He chaired the 1870 state convention of Republicans in Jacksonville.

In 1893, a photograph documents that he was the president of Edward Waters College.

His son John R. Scott Jr., earned a Bachelor of Divinity, was also a minister of the African Methodist Episcopal Church (and secretary of its conference, 1889), a member of the Florida Legislature, and a professor of homiletics (preaching) at Edward Waters College.

== See also ==
- African American officeholders from the end of the Civil War until before 1900
