= John R. Scott Jr. =

Florida politician

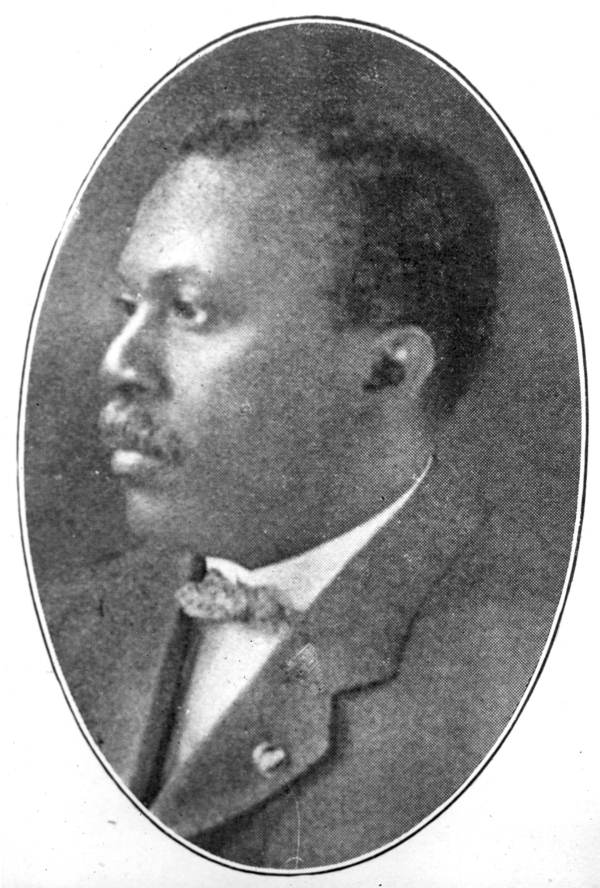
- Scott in 1889

Member of the Florida House of Representatives from the Duval County district
- In office 1889–1891

John R. Scott Jr. was a pastor in the A. M. E. Church, served as president of Edward Waters College, held local political offices in Jacksonville, Florida, and served as a state representatives. His father John R. Scott Sr. was also a leader in the A.M.E. church who served as a state representative in Florida.

He represented Duval County in the Florida House of Representatives from 1889 until 1891. He and A. Lewis were the last African Americans to serve in the Florida legislature after the Reconstruction era for 80 years.

== See also ==
- African American officeholders from the end of the Civil War until before 1900
