= John Scott (physician, died 1846) =

English surgeon

- Born: 1798
- Died: 11 April 1846 (aged 47–48)
- Occupation: Surgeon

John Scott (1798 – 11 April 1846) was an English surgeon.

== Biography ==
Scott was only son of James Scott, a general practitioner of medicine, living at Bromley in Kent. His father acquired a large practice, and was particularly successful in the treatment of chronic ulcers and of diseased joints. John Scott was educated first at a private school in Sevenoaks, and afterwards at the Charterhouse. He was then apprenticed to Sir William Blizard, the senior surgeon to the London Hospital in Whitechapel. He was admitted a licentiate of the Society of Apothecaries on 29 April 1819, and a member of the Royal College of Surgeons of England on 2 June 1820.

He practised with his father at Bromley for a short time, but after marrying he came to London, and was living in New Broad Street in 1824. On 24 November 1826 he was elected surgeon to the Ophthalmic Hospital in Moorfields in succession to [Sir] William Lawrence. Scott was elected assistant surgeon to the London Hospital on 18 July 1827. He was appointed full surgeon on 28 March 1831, resigning on 3 Dec. 1845. He died at Brighton, after a prolonged illness, on 11 April 1846.

Scott revolutionised one department of surgery by introducing the passive treatment of diseased joints. His method, however, was distasteful to his contemporaries owing to the unnecessary complications with which he surrounded it; but stripped of these, his principle remained a potent factor in surgery. He treated chronic ulcers by the method his father had taught him of strapping the leg from the toes upwards, and he was thus opposed to Thomas Baynton's method, which consisted in applying the strapping for only a short distance above the ulcer. Scott's dressing and Scott's ointment became known to every student of surgery, though they are now rarely used. His dressing had, as its base, a camphorated mercurial compound. Constant practice is said to have rendered him the most skilful bandager in London, at a time when bandaging in the London hospitals was almost a fine art.

Scott was distinguished as a surgeon by the rapidity and by the general accuracy of his diagnosis. He displayed great decision and energy in the treatment of his patients. He was a bold, but not particularly brilliant operator, and he is said to have been the first surgeon in England to remove the upper jaw. He was of an uncertain and irritable temper, which disease sometimes rendered overbearing.

His works are:

- ‘Surgical Observations on … Chronic Inflammations … particularly in Diseases of the Joints,’ 8vo, London, 1828; a new edit. by W. H. Smith, London, 8vo, 1857: a most valuable work, for it lays down very clearly the necessity for putting at rest diseased joints.
- ‘Cases of Tic-douloureux and other Forms of Neuralgia,’ 8vo, London, 1834.
- ‘Cataract and its Treatment,’ 8vo, London, 1843: the object of this work was to introduce a sickle-shaped knife, but the instrument never came into general use.
