= Elizabeth Harvey (historian) =

British historian

Elizabeth Harvey is a British historian of 20th-century Germany.

Harvey received her PhD in 1987 from the University of Oxford. Since 1987 she has held positions at the Universities of Salford, Dundee, Liverpool, and, more recently, Nottingham.

Her research and teaching focus on the 20th-century history of Germany and the comparative social and cultural history of 20th-century Europe, particularly gender, nationalism, imperialism, youth and youth movements, war and reconstruction, comparative welfare history, and visual studies.

== Books ==
- Harvey, Elizabeth, and Johannes Hürter., eds. Hitler - New Research. 2018. German yearbook of contemporary history, volume 3. De Gruyter Oldenbourg, [2018] ISBN 9783110553222
- Harvey, Elizabeth. Women and the Nazi East: Agents and Witnesses of Germanization. New Haven, Conn: Yale University Press, 2003.ISBN 9780300100402
- Harvey, Elizabeth. Youth and the Welfare State in the Weimar Republic. Oxford: Clarendon, 1993. ISBN 9780191676123
- Harvey, Elizabeth, Johannes Hürter, Maiken Umbach, and Andreas Wirsching, eds. . Private Life and Privacy in Nazi Germany. Cambridge: Cambridge University Press, 2019.
- Harvey, Elizabeth, and Lynn Abrams. Gender Relations in German History: Power, Agency, and Experience from the Sixteenth to the Twentieth Century. Durham: Duke University Press, 1997.
