= Captain John Scott =

Settler of Long Island

John Scott
- Born: c. 1634
- Died: 1704 (aged ~70); Barbados
- Military career
- Rank: Major
- Conflicts: Anglo-Dutch Wars

John Scott (c. 1634–1704), often called John Scott of Long Island, was a royal adviser, military leader, spy, cartographer, attorney, land speculator, and early settler and leader of Long Island. He lobbied to make Long Island a colony in North America with himself as governor and, when not appointed by the crown, was elected President of Long Island by that region's leaders. He was often in financial and legal trouble through land speculation and other enterprises and has been called a swindler and scoundrel. He was the principal accuser in the plot leading to the imprisonment of Samuel Pepys in 1679.

He travelled extensively in the Caribbean, authoring a History and Description of the River of Amazones and playing a key role in determining the boundary between Venezuela and Guyana.

== Biography ==
=== Early years ===
While a boy in 1641, John Scott was exiled from England on charges of treason. While the exact charge is unknown, it is likely related to the volatile climate of the years leading to the English Civil War. According to the most complete biography of Scott, he was sold to the Southwick family, for whom he toiled until, ruined and defamed for their anti-Puritan beliefs, they further sold him to a purported child trafficker, Emmanuel Downing. Scott was held in indentured servitude until reaching the age of majority. The majority of this time was spent in Salem, Massachusetts, a time that came to a sudden end after some allege without citation, Scott killed a young girl in a shotgun accident. He was sent to work for a captain in Southold, New York. During these years, Scott spent much of his time befriending and trading with the local Native Americans and managed to learn their languages. Shortly before or after the end of his servitude, Scott and his employer were arrested for plundering a Dutch vessel in the port of New Haven, Connecticut, a charge that was later dropped.

In 1657, no longer in servitude, Scott moved to North Sea, New York and then Southampton, New York, where he was elected a freeman, a mark of a reputable property owner. Scott became an attorney throughout The Hamptons. During this time, he married Deborah Raynor and was granted land adjoining his father-in-law's property in Southampton.

=== Trip to England ===
Scott returned to England in late 1660 or early 1661, where he became an advisor to King Charles II regarding the activities of New Netherland, the Dutch colony that occupied the western portions of Long Island. Scott, a crafty landowner who used his familiarity with the natives to his advantage, claimed to own a third of Long Island at this time. He petitioned the king that he deserved to be appointed governor of Long Island but was not successful.

Also at this time, John Scott made the acquaintance of heiress and leading Quaker Dorothea Scott Gotherson and her husband, Major John Gotherson. Dorothea was heir to Scott's Hall in Ashford, Kent, coming from the Scott family of which John Scott had long laid questionable claims of membership. Prior to his return to America, John Scott persuaded the Gothersons to give him two thousand pounds of money in return for vast lands in Long Island. In later years it would be found that the sale was a hoax. Dorothea petitioned the King and in time Samuel Pepys would take a deposition from her.

=== Return to Long Island ===
John Scott returned to Long Island by 1663, brandishing legal documents and letters filled with insignia and parading his wife Deborah in an outfit fit for royalty. Feigning more authority than he had, John Scott persuaded the settlers of Setauket, New York to grant him control of their lands in exchange for deeds of equal size elsewhere. He also claimed to be a representative of the Atherton Trading Company of New England engaging in the interest of Thomas Chiffinch, who entered the partnership. Scott became one of the most important figures in early Brookhaven, New York. This township was first settled at Setauket and reached most of its present size by 1657, with the names Setauket and Brookhaven interchangeably denoting either the smaller village or larger town. John Scott chose this region as the base of his activities and renamed it to Ashford, after his birthplace and questionable ancestral homeland. He constructed three stately houses, all named for homes of the Scott family in the original Ashford. The first was built in the original settlement formerly named Setauket and was given the name Egerton. The other two he built in previously uninhabited territory to the East. One was Scott's Hall on Mount Misery neck, in the current Port Jefferson suburb of Belle Terre. The other was Braebourne, to the East of Old Mans Harbor (Mount Sinai Harbor), in what is now Miller Place, New York.

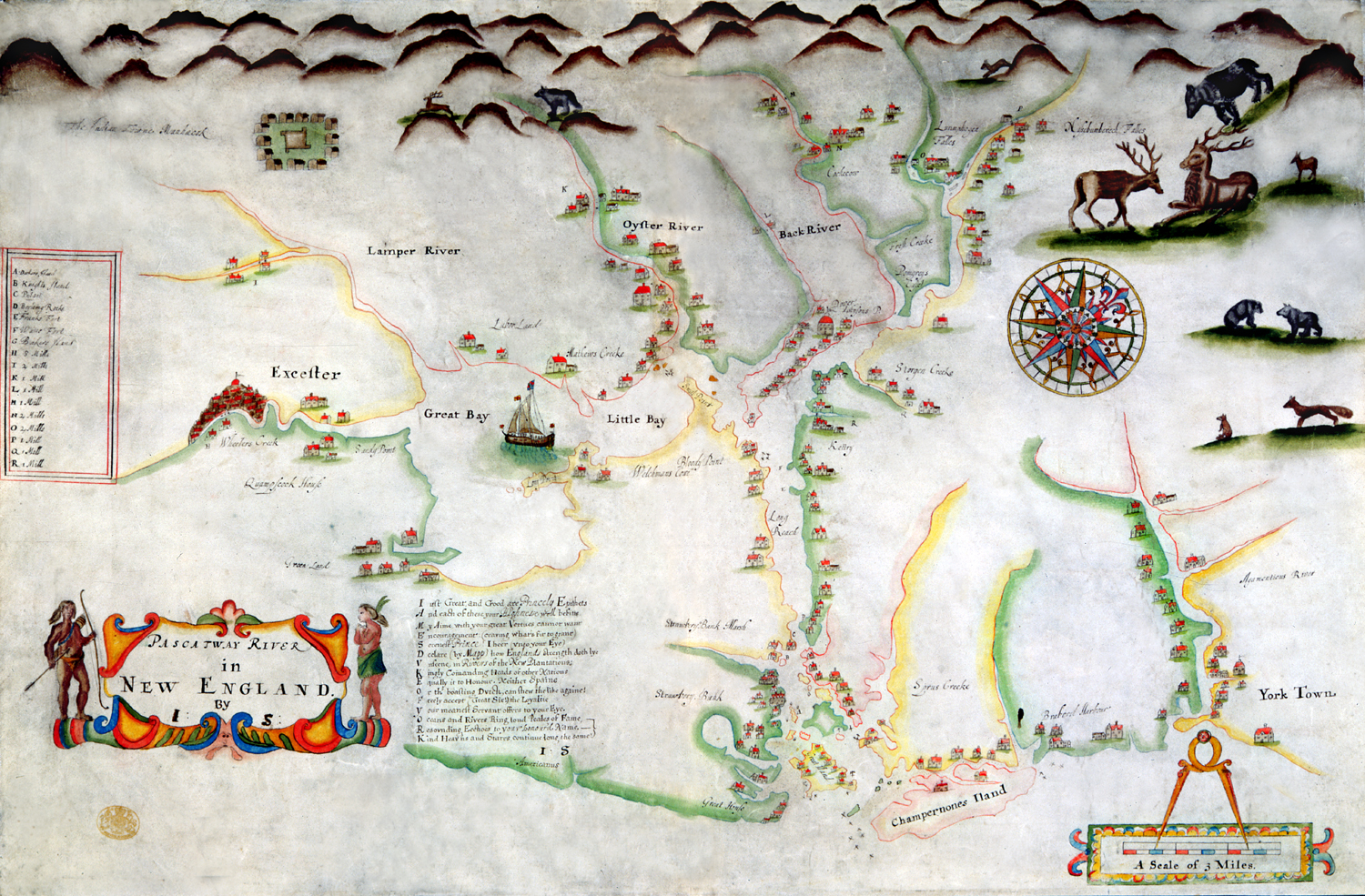
1667 map of modern-day eastern New Hampshire credited to John Scott, signed J.S. Americanus

John Scott supplemented his role as advisor to the king on Long Island affairs by making decorative maps of the New England area. A number of these maps remain in existence and are held by the British Museum. On one of John Scott's maps from the 1660s, he presents the New England coast from Boston to present-day New Jersey. Here he neglected to show all but a handful of settlements on Long Island despite including all three of the houses he constructed by name.

At this time, sections of English Long Island were de facto governed by John Winthrop the Younger and his Puritan colony of Connecticut. Long Islanders felt threatened that their autonomy would soon be at an end. A meeting took place between the leaders of English Long Island, represented by Hempstead, Gravesend, Flushing, Newtown, Oyster Bay, and Jamaica. At the meeting, the Long Islanders debated the looming threat of annexation and concluded by electing John Scott their leader until higher orders came from England. John Scott was thus fashioned the President of Long Island. Brandishing this title, Scott and a formidable force of men marched into Brooklyn and other Dutch villages, declared the inhabitants trespassers, and conducted raids purposed to lessen the population.

=== Arrest and Imprisonment ===
John Winthrop, leader of the Connecticut Colony in Hartford, became riled that John Scott's leadership was warding off his colony's control over Long Island and sent a warrant for John Scott's arrest. Scott was ultimately found and brought to trial in Hartford for "sundry heinous crimes". This was protested by John Scott's Long Island followers and also by John Davenport, a leader of the New Haven Colony, who noted that Winthrop was meddling in towns under New Haven's jurisdiction.

Though sent to prison, John Scott would escape by July 1664, supposedly using rope smuggled into his cell by his visiting wife.

=== The capture of New Netherland ===
In the interim months, the settlers of Setauket and Smithtown set to work nullifying John Scott's land claims in their regions and reclaiming the powers they had before Scott's dominance. Also during Scott's stay in prison, King Charles II officially resolved to conquer New Netherland. In August, the fleet of Richard Nicolls sailed into New York Harbor and successfully demanded surrender of the colony to the English crown. For this task, the English forces used the reports that had been made by John Scott and Samuel Maverick, both of whom had served as royal advisors to the King on Dutch activities in North American.

In March 1665, Nicolls declared that Long Island would henceforth be within the jurisdiction of the newly created Province of New York. Scott was living in Hempstead at this time, still a wanted man but not actively pursued. Nicolls ordered a meeting among John Scott and the Long Island colonists and, after several complaints over previous land claims and exchanges, arbitrated that John Scott was exonerated of all debts.

=== Military leader in Barbados ===
While sentenced to appear at Long Island's Court of Assizes over charges of fraud in September 1665, John Scott escaped his quarters and boarded a ship for Barbados, never to return. At the trial he was absent from, it was ordered that Scott's houses be sold off and the funds be given to his wife, then divorced, and family.

In Barbados, John Scott was commissioned by Sir Tobias Bridge. Assuming the rank of Major, Scott operated a small fleet of ships in the Caribbean, at that time an area of activity in the English wars against the Dutch and French. In this role Scott took possession of Guiana, Cuba, and Tobago in the name of the British crown. John Scott later faced a court-martial after a botched attempt to take St. Kitts.

=== Return to Europe ===
Scott returned once again to England in late 1667 and was given the post of royal cartographer. It was at this time that he wrote his history The Coasts and Islands of America and other writings. Scott's accounts of his personal exploits in the region would be used as evidence in the 1895 boundary dispute between British Guiana and Venezuela.

When Richard Nicolls returned to England and informed the King of John Scott's character, Scott vanished from London and reappeared in Holland.

In Holland, John Scott spied for the English, then as a double agent for Holland. He next worked for the French Prince of Condé as mapmaker. Upon meeting Scott in France, the Duke of Buckingham declared him to be "a very useful rogue".

Around this time, Scott brought charges of high treason against the diarist and Secretary to the Admiralty Samuel Pepys. Pepys dodged execution but was imprisoned for a time in the Tower of London. Scott's charges were likely the result of previous charges that Pepys had made against Scott, which had gone without punishment. It is noteworthy that following Scott's charges, Pepys prepared a wide array of counter-charges and witness statements against Scott. Though never used in court, many of these counter statements were for a time accepted as fact, further cementing Scott's roguish image in history.

John Scott spent much of his remaining years in Norway, supported by individuals who feared his return to England. He returned to England in 1695. Upon his return, John Scott was arrested for travelling from France without authorization and sent to Newgate Prison, but was pardoned in the summer of 1696. He spent his last years in the Caribbean, dying in Barbados in 1704.

== Appearance ==
No portrait or likeness of John Scott is known to exist. While Scott was in disguise as a spy in 1678, a description was made:

A proper well-set man in a great light [colored] periwig, rough-visaged, having large hair on his eyebrows, hollow eyed, a little... cast with his eye, full faced about the cheeks, about 46 years of age with a black hat and a [straight] bodied coat [cloth colored] with silver lace behind.
