= Electoral results for the Division of Adelaide =

Australian division election results

This is a list of electoral results for the Division of Adelaide in Australian federal elections from the division's creation in 1903 until the present.

== Members ==
Member	Party	Term
Charles Kingston	Protectionist	1903–1908
Ernest Roberts	Labor	1908–1913
George Edwin Yates	Labor	1914–1919
Reginald Blundell	Nationalist	1919–1922
George Edwin Yates	Labor	1922–1931
Fred Stacey	United Australia	1931–1943
Cyril Chambers	Labor	1943–1957
Cyril Chambers	Independent	1957–1958
Cyril Chambers	Labor	1958–1958
Joe Sexton	Labor	1958–1966
Andrew Jones	Liberal	1966–1969
Chris Hurford	Labor	1969–1988
Mike Pratt	Liberal	1988–1990
Bob Catley	Labor	1990–1993
Trish Worth	Liberal	1993–2004
Kate Ellis	Labor	2004–2019
Steve Georganas	Labor	2019–present

== Election results ==
=== Elections in the 2020s ===
==== 2025 ====
2025 Australian federal election: Adelaide
Party	Candidate	Votes	%	±%
Labor	Steve Georganas	51,384	46.59	+6.61
Liberal	Amy Grantham	26,708	24.22	−7.78
Greens	Mat Monti	20,773	18.83	−1.27
One Nation	Riley Size	4,435	4.02	+1.03
Trumpet of Patriots	Steve Marks	3,043	2.76	+1.99
Animal Justice	Lionel Pengilley	2,627	2.38	+2.38
Fusion	Matthew McMillan	1,323	1.20	−0.25
Total formal votes		110,293	96.26	+0.05
Informal votes		4,290	3.74	−0.05
Turnout		114,583	87.16	−3.02
Two-party-preferred result
Labor	Steve Georganas	76,194	69.08	+7.17
Liberal	Amy Grantham	34,099	30.92	−7.17
Labor hold		Swing	+7.17	

Results are not final. Last updated on 15 May 2025 at 9:45 PM ACST.

==== 2022 ====
2022 Australian federal election: Adelaide
Party	Candidate	Votes	%	±%
Labor	Steve Georganas	45,086	39.98	−0.29
Liberal	Amy Grantham	36,080	32.00	−4.16
Greens	Rebecca Galdies	22,666	20.10	+4.38
One Nation	Gayle Allwood	3,376	2.99	+2.99
United Australia	Sean Allwood	3,055	2.71	−0.54
Fusion	Matthew McMillan	1,631	1.45	+1.45
Federation	Faith Gerhard	870	0.77	+0.77
Total formal votes		112,764	96.21	−0.09
Informal votes		4,438	3.79	+0.09
Turnout		117,202	90.18	−1.34
Two-party-preferred result
Labor	Steve Georganas	69,816	61.91	+3.73
Liberal	Amy Grantham	42,948	38.09	−3.73
Labor hold		Swing	+3.73	

Alluvial diagram for preference flows in the seat of Adelaide in the 2022 federal election. indicates at what stage the winning candidate had over 50% of the votes and was declared the winner.

=== Elections in the 2010s ===
==== 2019 ====
2019 Australian federal election: Adelaide
Party	Candidate	Votes	%	±%
Labor	Steve Georganas	43,163	40.27	+1.20
Liberal	Shaun Osborn	38,753	36.16	+3.60
Greens	Barbara Pocock	16,853	15.72	+5.75
United Australia	Antonio Rea	3,479	3.25	+3.25
Animal Justice	Deanna Kangas	2,894	2.70	+1.23
Democrats	Chris James	2,039	1.90	+1.90
Total formal votes		107,181	96.30	+0.18
Informal votes		4,118	3.70	−0.18
Turnout		111,299	91.52	+1.73
Two-party-preferred result
Labor	Steve Georganas	62,362	58.18	−0.12
Liberal	Shaun Osborn	44,819	41.82	+0.12
Labor hold		Swing	−0.12	

==== 2016 ====
2016 Australian federal election: Adelaide
Party	Candidate	Votes	%	±%
Liberal	David Colovic	34,809	36.43	−5.63
Labor	Kate Ellis	34,325	35.93	−6.33
Xenophon	Joe Hill	12,283	12.86	+12.86
Greens	Sophie Guy	9,973	10.44	+0.32
Family First	Adrian Rivish	1,832	1.92	−0.45
Animal Justice	Matt Tidswell	1,292	1.35	+1.35
Liberal Democrats	Tyrone Lock	1,030	1.08	+1.08
Total formal votes		95,544	96.84	+0.80
Informal votes		3,118	3.16	−0.80
Turnout		98,662	90.34	−2.13
Two-party-preferred result
Labor	Kate Ellis	52,219	54.65	+0.70
Liberal	David Colovic	43,325	45.35	−0.70
Labor hold		Swing	+0.70	

==== 2013 ====
2013 Australian federal election: Adelaide
Party	Candidate	Votes	%	±%
Labor	Kate Ellis	38,650	42.26	−1.52
Liberal	Carmen Garcia	38,463	42.06	+4.31
Greens	Ruth Beach	9,251	10.12	−3.50
Family First	Peter Lee	2,169	2.37	+0.18
Palmer United	Vincent Scali	1,943	2.12	+2.12
Socialist Alliance	Liah Lazarou	980	1.07	+0.18
Total formal votes		91,456	96.04	+0.86
Informal votes		3,770	3.96	−0.86
Turnout		95,226	92.47	−0.61
Two-party-preferred result
Labor	Kate Ellis	49,338	53.95	−3.57
Liberal	Carmen Garcia	42,118	46.05	+3.57
Labor hold		Swing	−3.57	

==== 2010 ====
2010 Australian federal election: Adelaide
Party	Candidate	Votes	%	±%
Labor	Kate Ellis	38,162	43.89	−4.37
Liberal	Luke Westley	32,673	37.57	−0.86
Greens	Ruth Beach	11,901	13.69	+3.94
Family First	Suzanne Neal	1,900	2.18	+0.15
Democrats	Marie Nicholls	819	0.94	−0.59
Socialist Alliance	Gemma Weedall	786	0.90	+0.90
Liberal Democrats	Christopher Steele	716	0.82	+0.82
Total formal votes		86,957	95.19	−1.70
Informal votes		4,394	4.81	+1.70
Turnout		91,351	92.72	−1.87
Two-party-preferred result
Labor	Kate Ellis	50,164	57.69	−0.84
Liberal	Luke Westley	36,793	42.31	+0.84
Labor hold		Swing	−0.84	

=== Elections in the 2000s ===
==== 2007 ====
2007 Australian federal election: Adelaide
Party	Candidate	Votes	%	±%
Labor	Kate Ellis	42,774	48.26	+6.34
Liberal	Tracy Marsh	34,056	38.43	−6.86
Greens	Peter Solly	8,641	9.75	+1.76
Family First	Dennis Slape	1,801	2.03	−0.03
Democrats	Sandy Biar	1,353	1.53	−0.06
Total formal votes		88,625	96.89	+1.29
Informal votes		2,840	3.11	−1.29
Turnout		91,465	94.56	+0.94
Two-party-preferred result
Labor	Kate Ellis	51,868	58.53	+7.20
Liberal	Tracy Marsh	36,757	41.47	−7.20
Labor hold		Swing	+7.20	

==== 2004 ====
2004 Australian federal election: Adelaide
Party	Candidate	Votes	%	±%
Liberal	Trish Worth	38,530	45.29	+0.82
Labor	Kate Ellis	35,666	41.92	+5.50
Greens	Jake Bugden	6,794	7.99	+2.02
Family First	Peter Robins	1,753	2.06	+2.06
Democrats	Richard Pascoe	1,355	1.59	−9.30
Independent	Amanda Barlow	978	1.15	+1.15
Total formal votes		85,076	95.60	+0.66
Informal votes		3,920	4.40	−0.66
Turnout		88,996	93.62	−1.09
Two-party-preferred result
Labor	Kate Ellis	43,671	51.33	+1.95
Liberal	Trish Worth	41,405	48.67	−1.95
Labor gain from Liberal		Swing	+1.95	

==== 2001 ====
2001 Australian federal election: Adelaide
Party	Candidate	Votes	%	±%
Liberal	Trish Worth	34,258	44.20	+0.80
Labor	Tim Stanley	28,732	37.07	−0.08
Democrats	Sue Mann	8,255	10.65	+0.93
Greens	Lynne Osborn	4,638	5.98	+2.82
One Nation	Lee Peacock	1,630	2.10	−3.34
Total formal votes		77,513	94.91	−0.70
Informal votes		4,156	5.09	+0.70
Turnout		81,669	94.81	
Two-party-preferred result
Liberal	Trish Worth	38,928	50.22	−0.43
Labor	Tim Stanley	38,585	49.78	+0.43
Liberal hold		Swing	−0.43	

=== Elections in the 1990s ===
==== 1998 ====
1998 Australian federal election: Adelaide
Party	Candidate	Votes	%	±%
Liberal	Trish Worth	32,173	43.41	−4.48
Labor	Karen Hannon	27,756	37.45	−0.29
Democrats	Tyron Beard	7,077	9.55	+1.33
One Nation	Suzanne Ramsey	3,837	5.18	+5.18
Greens	Mark Moran	2,518	3.40	+0.64
Independent	Rita Hunt	462	0.62	+0.62
Natural Law	Vladimir Lorenzon	287	0.39	−0.05
Total formal votes		74,110	95.54	+0.23
Informal votes		3,458	4.46	−0.23
Turnout		77,568	94.41	−0.13
Two-party-preferred result
Liberal	Trish Worth	37,731	50.91	−2.58
Labor	Karen Hannon	36,379	49.09	+2.58
Liberal hold		Swing	−2.58	

==== 1996 ====
1996 Australian federal election: Adelaide
Party	Candidate	Votes	%	±%
Liberal	Trish Worth	35,285	47.89	+3.07
Labor	Gail Gago	27,802	37.74	−3.38
Democrats	Mark Andrews	6,052	8.21	−0.22
Greens	Tim Graham	2,028	2.75	+2.75
Independent	Dan Carey	1,142	1.55	+1.55
Grey Power	Barbara Fraser	542	0.74	+0.74
Natural Law	Peter Fenwick	322	0.44	−1.54
Independent	Jane Manifold	305	0.41	+0.41
Independent	David Bidstrup	194	0.26	−0.12
Total formal votes		73,672	95.31	−0.55
Informal votes		3,623	4.69	+0.55
Turnout		77,295	94.55	+1.18
Two-party-preferred result
Liberal	Trish Worth	39,182	53.50	+2.18
Labor	Gail Gago	34,062	46.50	−2.18
Liberal hold		Swing	+2.18	

==== 1993 ====
1993 Australian federal election: Adelaide
Party	Candidate	Votes	%	±%
Liberal	Trish Worth	34,296	44.82	+3.71
Labor	Bob Catley	31,459	41.11	+1.70
Democrats	Matthew Mitchell	6,451	8.43	−5.91
Independent	Jack King	1,624	2.12	+2.12
Natural Law	Peter Fenwick	1,514	1.98	+1.98
	Adam Hanieh	558	0.73	+0.73
Independent	Chris Matuhina	318	0.42	+0.42
Independent	David Bidstrup	295	0.39	+0.39
Total formal votes		76,515	95.86	−0.30
Informal votes		3,304	4.14	+0.30
Turnout		79,819	93.37	
Two-party-preferred result
Liberal	Trish Worth	39,188	51.31	+3.15
Labor	Bob Catley	37,181	48.69	−3.15
Liberal gain from Labor		Swing	+3.15	

==== 1990 ====
1990 Australian federal election: Adelaide
Party	Candidate	Votes	%	±%
Labor	Bob Catley	27,422	40.5	−8.4
Liberal	Mike Pratt	26,953	39.8	+4.3
Democrats	Peter Mann	9,197	13.6	+4.5
Greens	Keith Oehme	1,878	2.8	+2.8
Call to Australia	Cathryn Linedale	1,123	1.7	+1.7
Independent	Jean Booth	1,100	1.6	+1.6
Total formal votes		67,673	96.1	
Informal votes		2,771	3.9	
Turnout		70,444	95.7	
Two-party-preferred result
Labor	Bob Catley	36,267	53.7	−2.8
Liberal	Mike Pratt	31,273	46.3	+2.8
Labor gain from Liberal		Swing	−2.8	

=== Elections in the 1980s ===
==== 1988 ====
Adelaide by-election, 1988
Party	Candidate	Votes	%	±%
Liberal	Mike Pratt	26,777	44.4	+8.9
Labor	Don Farrell	22,897	38.0	−10.9
Democrats	Ian McLeish	7,097	11.8	+2.7
Independent	Bronwyn Mewett	1,408	2.3	+2.3
National	Bryan Stokes	1,000	1.7	−3.4
Independent	Michael Brander	409	0.9	+0.9
Independent	John Litten	367	0.6	+0.6
Unite Australia	Dorothy McGregor-Dey	218	0.4	+0.4
Republican	Peter Consandine	104	0.2	+0.2
Total formal votes		60,277	96.1	
Informal votes		2,432	3.9	
Turnout		62,709	88.0	
Two-party-preferred result
Liberal	Mike Pratt	31,195	51.9	+8.4
Labor	Don Farrell	28,967	48.2	−8.4
Liberal gain from Labor		Swing	+8.4	

==== 1987 ====
1987 Australian federal election: Adelaide
Party	Candidate	Votes	%	±%
Labor	Chris Hurford	31,572	48.9	−6.4
Liberal	Peter Panagaris	22,943	35.5	−0.3
Democrats	Chris Wurm	5,857	9.1	+2.2
National	Bryan Stokes	3,287	5.1	+4.4
Communist	Graham Smith	535	0.8	+0.8
Unite Australia	Charles Shahin	368	0.6	+0.6
Total formal votes		64,562	92.4	
Informal votes		5,320	7.6	
Turnout		69,882	92.6	
Two-party-preferred result
Labor	Chris Hurford	36,468	56.5	−3.5
Liberal	Peter Panagaris	28,056	43.5	+3.5
Labor hold		Swing	−3.5	

==== 1984 ====
1984 Australian federal election: Adelaide
Party	Candidate	Votes	%	±%
Labor	Chris Hurford	34,960	55.3	+1.8
Liberal	Jenni London	22,650	35.8	−0.9
Democrats	Andrew Sickerdick	4,383	6.9	+0.3
Independent	Mark Thiel	479	0.8	+0.8
National	Bryan Stokes	434	0.7	+0.7
Independent	John Buik	284	0.5	−2.2
Total formal votes		63,190	90.0	
Informal votes		7,031	10.0	
Turnout		70,221	94.5	
Two-party-preferred result
Labor	Chris Hurford	37,894	60.0	−0.3
Liberal	Jenni London	25,290	40.0	+0.3
Labor hold		Swing	−0.3	

==== 1983 ====
1983 Australian federal election: Adelaide
Party	Candidate	Votes	%	±%
Labor	Chris Hurford	39,134	55.8	+3.7
Liberal	Barry James	24,156	34.4	−1.8
Democrats	Eileen Farmer	4,604	6.6	−5.1
Independent	John Buik	1,894	2.7	+2.7
Socialist Workers	Paul Petit	385	0.5	+0.5
Total formal votes		70,173	96.8	
Informal votes		2,314	3.2	
Turnout		72,487	93.5	
Two-party-preferred result
Labor	Chris Hurford		62.6	+4.1
Liberal	Barry James		37.4	−4.1
Labor hold		Swing	+4.1	

==== 1980 ====
1980 Australian federal election: Adelaide
Party	Candidate	Votes	%	±%
Labor	Chris Hurford	36,124	52.1	+1.2
Liberal	Peter Camm	25,057	36.2	−2.1
Democrats	Peter Adamson	8,109	11.7	+0.9
Total formal votes		69,290	97.2	
Informal votes		2,008	2.8	
Turnout		71,298	94.1	
Two-party-preferred result
Labor	Chris Hurford		58.5	+2.2
Liberal	Peter Camm		41.5	−2.2
Labor hold		Swing	+2.2	

=== Elections in the 1970s ===
==== 1977 ====
1977 Australian federal election: Adelaide
Party	Candidate	Votes	%	±%
Labor	Chris Hurford	35,786	50.9	+0.9
Liberal	George Basisovs	26,974	38.3	−4.2
Democrats	Geoffrey Stewart	7,610	10.8	+10.8
Total formal votes		70,370	96.3	
Informal votes		2,728	3.7	
Turnout		73,098	93.9	
Two-party-preferred result
Labor	Chris Hurford		56.3	+3.0
Liberal	George Basisovs		43.7	−3.0
Labor hold		Swing	+3.0	

==== 1975 ====
1975 Australian federal election: Adelaide
Party	Candidate	Votes	%	±%
Labor	Chris Hurford	28,621	49.5	−6.3
Liberal	Harold Steele	24,825	43.0	+9.6
Liberal Movement	Robert Hercus	3,817	6.6	−2.3
Australia	David Middleton	525	0.9	−1.0
Total formal votes		57,788	93.3	
Informal votes		1,633	2.7	
Turnout		59,421	95.2	
Two-party-preferred result
Labor	Chris Hurford	30,487	52.8	−6.3
Liberal	Harold Steele	27,301	47.2	+6.3
Labor hold		Swing	−6.3	

==== 1974 ====
1974 Australian federal election: Adelaide
Party	Candidate	Votes	%	±%
Labor	Chris Hurford	31,572	55.8	+0.0
Liberal	Harold Steele	18,911	33.4	−5.8
Liberal Movement	Ray Buttery	5,005	8.9	+8.9
Australia	John Davies	1,061	1.9	+1.9
Total formal votes		56,549	96.8	
Informal votes		1,866	3.2	
Turnout		58,415	95.6	
Two-party-preferred result
Labor	Chris Hurford		59.1	+1.2
Liberal	Harold Steele		40.9	−1.2
Labor hold		Swing	+1.2	

==== 1972 ====
1972 Australian federal election: Adelaide
Party	Candidate	Votes	%	±%
Labor	Chris Hurford	28,816	55.8	−2.5
Liberal	Keith Ashdown	20,272	39.2	+4.3
Democratic Labor	George Basisovs	1,738	3.4	−0.8
Communist	Elliott Johnston	848	1.6	+1.6
Total formal votes		51,674	97.1	
Informal votes		1,553	2.9	
Turnout		53,227	95.6	
Two-party-preferred result
Labor	Chris Hurford		57.9	−3.4
Liberal	Keith Ashdown		42.1	+3.4
Labor hold		Swing	−3.4	

=== Elections in the 1960s ===
==== 1969 ====
1969 Australian federal election: Adelaide
Party	Candidate	Votes	%	±%
Labor	Chris Hurford	29,641	58.3	+12.1
Liberal	Andrew Jones	17,744	34.9	−8.4
Democratic Labor	George Basisovs	2,131	4.2	−0.7
Australia	Anne McMenamin	734	1.4	+1.4
Independent	Anatolij Onishko	582	1.1	+1.1
Total formal votes		50,832	95.3	
Informal votes		2,507	4.7	
Turnout		53,339	95.6	
Two-party-preferred result
Labor	Chris Hurford		61.3	+14.3
Liberal	Andrew Jones		38.7	−14.3
Labor gain from Liberal		Swing	+14.3	

==== 1966 ====
1966 Australian federal election: Adelaide
Party	Candidate	Votes	%	±%
Liberal	Andrew Jones	14,724	48.7	+11.1
Labor	Joe Sexton	14,027	46.4	−9.7
Democratic Labor	George Basisovs	1,466	4.9	−1.4
Total formal votes		30,217	96.6	
Informal votes		1,065	3.4	
Turnout		31,282	95.0	
Two-party-preferred result
Liberal	Andrew Jones	15,961	52.8	+10.0
Labor	Joe Sexton	14,256	47.2	−10.0
Liberal gain from Labor		Swing	+10.0	

==== 1963 ====
1963 Australian federal election: Adelaide
Party	Candidate	Votes	%	±%
Labor	Joe Sexton	18,194	56.1	+0.3
Liberal	Karl-Juergen Liebetrau	12,188	37.6	+3.1
Democratic Labor	Patrick Coffey	2,036	6.3	−3.4
Total formal votes		32,418	97.6	
Informal votes		797	2.4	
Turnout		33,215	95.9	
Two-party-preferred result
Labor	Joe Sexton		57.2	−0.3
Liberal	Karl-Juergen Liebetrau		42.8	+0.3
Labor hold		Swing	−0.3	

==== 1961 ====
1961 Australian federal election: Adelaide
Party	Candidate	Votes	%	±%
Labor	Joe Sexton	18,804	55.8	+5.8
Liberal	John Rundle	11,648	34.5	−5.3
Democratic Labor	Ursula Cook	3,276	9.7	−0.5
Total formal votes		33,728	96.2	
Informal votes		1,317	3.8	
Turnout		35,045	95.0	
Two-party-preferred result
Labor	Joe Sexton		57.5	+4.7
Liberal	John Rundle		42.5	−4.7
Labor hold		Swing	+4.7	

=== Elections in the 1950s ===
==== 1958 ====
1958 Australian federal election: Adelaide
Party	Candidate	Votes	%	±%
Labor	Joe Sexton	17,869	50.0	−0.6
Liberal	Ian Wilson	14,226	39.8	+3.7
Democratic Labor	Baylon Ryan	3,642	10.2	−1.6
Total formal votes		35,737	95.9	
Informal votes		1,530	4.1	
Turnout		37,267	94.2	
Two-party-preferred result
Labor	Joe Sexton		52.8	−2.5
Liberal	Ian Wilson		47.2	+2.5
Labor hold		Swing	−2.5	

==== 1955 ====
1955 Australian federal election: Adelaide
Party	Candidate	Votes	%	±%
Labor	Cyril Chambers	18,801	50.6	−11.4
Liberal	James Maitland	13,430	36.1	−0.3
Labor (A-C)	Olaf Alland	4,395	11.8	+11.8
Communist	Jim Moss	526	1.4	−0.3
Total formal votes		37,152	94.2	
Informal votes		2,302	5.8	
Turnout		39,454	95.4	
Two-party-preferred result
Labor	Cyril Chambers		55.3	−8.0
Liberal	James Maitland		44.7	+8.0
Labor hold		Swing	−8.0	

==== 1954 ====
1954 Australian federal election: Adelaide
Party	Candidate	Votes	%	±%
Labor	Cyril Chambers	18,446	55.3	−6.5
Liberal	Nancy Buttfield	14,266	42.8	+4.5
Communist	Charles McCaffrey	625	1.9	+0.0
Total formal votes		33,337	98.1	
Informal votes		655	1.9	
Turnout		33,992	96.2	
Two-party-preferred result
Labor	Cyril Chambers		57.0	−4.6
Liberal	Nancy Buttfield		43.0	+4.6
Labor hold		Swing	−4.6	

==== 1951 ====
1951 Australian federal election: Adelaide
Party	Candidate	Votes	%	±%
Labor	Cyril Chambers	22,938	59.8	+0.0
Liberal	Thomas Phillips	14,670	38.3	+1.1
Communist	Edward Robertson	732	1.9	+0.0
Total formal votes		38,340	97.3	
Informal votes		1,076	2.7	
Turnout		39,416	97.2	
Two-party-preferred result
Labor	Cyril Chambers		61.6	−0.4
Liberal	Thomas Phillips		38.4	+0.4
Labor hold		Swing	−0.4	

=== Elections in the 1940s ===
==== 1949 ====
1949 Australian federal election: Adelaide
Party	Candidate	Votes	%	±%
Labor	Cyril Chambers	23,823	59.8	−2.1
Liberal	Basil Harford	14,820	37.2	+3.8
Communist	Elsie Watt	683	1.7	−3.0
Independent	Christopher Doherty	504	1.3	+1.3
Total formal votes		39,830	96.9	
Informal votes		1,260	3.1	
Turnout		41,090	96.8	
Two-party-preferred result
Labor	Cyril Chambers		62.1	−4.0
Liberal	Basil Harford		37.9	+4.0
Labor hold		Swing	−4.0	

==== 1946 ====
1946 Australian federal election: Adelaide
Party	Candidate	Votes	%	±%
Labor	Cyril Chambers	40,638	59.9	−0.1
Liberal	Ian Hayward	24,238	35.7	+1.9
Communist	Alf Watt	2,986	4.4	+0.1
Total formal votes		67,862	96.0	
Informal votes		2,805	4.0	
Turnout		70,667	93.3	
Two-party-preferred result
Labor	Cyril Chambers		63.9	−1.7
Liberal	Ian Hayward		36.1	+1.7
Labor hold		Swing	−1.7	

==== 1943 ====
1943 Australian federal election: Adelaide
Party	Candidate	Votes	%	±%
Labor	Cyril Chambers	40,110	60.0	+26.1
United Australia	Fred Stacey	22,636	33.8	−16.2
Communist	Alf Watt	2,854	4.3	+4.3
Independent Labor	George Edwin Yates	1,291	1.9	+1.9
Total formal votes		66,891	96.1	
Informal votes		2,714	3.9	
Turnout		69,605	95.8	
Two-party-preferred result
Labor	Cyril Chambers		65.6	+20.3
United Australia	Fred Stacey		34.4	−20.3
Labor gain from United Australia		Swing	+20.3	

==== 1940 ====
1940 Australian federal election: Adelaide
Party	Candidate	Votes	%	±%
United Australia	Fred Stacey	29,393	50.0	+4.7
Labor	Edgar Dawes	19,950	33.9	−20.8
Aust. dlp	Raymond Davis	4,906	8.3	+8.3
Independent Labor	Bert Edwards	4,587	7.8	+7.8
Total formal votes		58,836	95.0	
Informal votes		3,090	5.0	
Turnout		61,926	95.0	
Two-party-preferred result
United Australia	Fred Stacey		54.7	+0.7
Labor	Edgar Dawes		45.3	−0.7
United Australia hold		Swing	+0.7	

=== Elections in the 1930s ===
==== 1937 ====
1937 Australian federal election: Adelaide
Party	Candidate	Votes	%	±%
United Australia	Fred Stacey	26,575	45.3	+8.5
Labor	Ken Bardolph	16,989	28.9	+17.8
Labor	George Edwin Yates	9,683	16.5	+16.5
Labor	Herbert George	5,451	9.3	+9.3
Total formal votes		58,698	93.3	
Informal votes		4,196	6.7	
Turnout		62,894	96.5	
Two-party-preferred result
United Australia	Fred Stacey	31,721	54.0	+0.8
Labor	Ken Bardolph	26,977	46.0	−0.8
United Australia hold		Swing	+0.8	

==== 1934 ====
1934 Australian federal election: Adelaide
Party	Candidate	Votes	%	±%
Labor	Ken Bardolph	19,985	36.9	+6.9
United Australia	Fred Stacey	19,941	36.8	−10.4
Independent	Alec Bagot	9,055	16.7	+16.7
Social Credit	Ernest Hergstrom	2,403	4.4	+4.4
Independent Labor	Arthur McArthur	1,711	3.2	+3.2
Independent Labor	Frank Blake	1,089	2.0	+2.0
Total formal votes		54,184	91.2	
Informal votes		5,212	8.8	
Turnout		59,396	94.2	
Two-party-preferred result
United Australia	Fred Stacey	28,848	53.2	−8.1
Labor	Ken Bardolph	25,336	46.8	+8.1
United Australia hold		Swing	−8.1	

==== 1931 ====
1931 Australian federal election: Adelaide
Party	Candidate	Votes	%	±%
Emergency Committee	Fred Stacey	15,907	42.1	+3.5
Labor	George Edwin Yates	11,193	29.6	−31.8
Lyons Latham	Crawford Vaughan	4,500	11.9	+11.9
Lang Labor	Tom Howard	3,058	8.1	+8.1
Independent	Agnes Goode	2,449	6.5	+6.5
Communist	John Zwolsman	655	1.7	+1.7
Total formal votes		37,762	90.7	
Informal votes		3,872	9.3	
Turnout		41,634	94.6	
Two-party-preferred result
Emergency Committee	Fred Stacey	22,523	59.6	+21.0
Labor	George Edwin Yates	15,239	40.4	−21.0
Emergency Committee gain from Labor		Swing	+21.0	

=== Elections in the 1920s ===
==== 1929 ====
1929 Australian federal election: Adelaide
Party	Candidate	Votes	%	±%
Labor	George Edwin Yates	24,174	61.4	+5.5
Nationalist	Arthur Wreford	15,171	38.6	−5.5
Total formal votes		39,345	95.6	
Informal votes		1,791	4.4	
Turnout		41,136	94.5	
Labor hold		Swing	+5.5	

==== 1928 ====
1928 Australian federal election: Adelaide
Party	Candidate	Votes	%	±%
Labor	George Edwin Yates	20,410	55.9	+5.0
Nationalist	George McLeay	16,114	44.1	−5.0
Total formal votes		36,524	89.9	
Informal votes		4,099	10.1	
Turnout		40,623	92.1	
Labor hold		Swing	+5.0	

==== 1925 ====
1925 Australian federal election: Adelaide
Party	Candidate	Votes	%	±%
Labor	George Edwin Yates	19,693	50.9	−0.8
Nationalist	George McLeay	19,018	49.1	+29.2
Total formal votes		38,711	95.2	
Informal votes		1,953	4.8	
Turnout		40,664	88.4	
Labor hold		Swing	−2.7	

==== 1922 ====
1922 Australian federal election: Adelaide
Party	Candidate	Votes	%	±%
Labor	George Edwin Yates	10,714	51.7	+6.8
Liberal	George McLeay	5,872	28.4	+28.4
Nationalist	Reginald Blundell	4,123	19.9	−33.8
Total formal votes		20,709	92.7	
Informal votes		1,629	7.3	
Turnout		22,338	63.4	
Two-party-preferred result
Labor	George Edwin Yates		53.6	+8.0
Liberal	George McLeay		46.4	+46.4
Labor gain from Nationalist		Swing	+8.0	

=== Elections in the 1910s ===
==== 1919 ====
1919 Australian federal election: Adelaide
Party	Candidate	Votes	%	±%
Nationalist	Reginald Blundell	10,523	50.8	+50.8
Labor	George Edwin Yates	10,184	49.2	−50.8
Total formal votes		20,707	96.3	
Informal votes		785	3.7	
Turnout		21,492	62.3	
Nationalist gain from Labor		Swing	+50.8	

==== 1917 ====
1917 Australian federal election: Adelaide
Party	Candidate	Votes	%	±%
Labor	George Edwin Yates	unopposed		
Labor hold		Swing		

==== 1914 ====
1914 Australian federal election: Adelaide
Party	Candidate	Votes	%	±%
Labor	George Edwin Yates	16,762	66.4	+0.3
Liberal	Walter Hamilton	8,461	33.5	+4.1
Total formal votes		25,223	97.6	
Informal votes		612	2.4	
Turnout		25,835	73.3	
Labor hold		Swing	−2.0	

==== 1914 ====
1914 Adelaide by-election
Party	Candidate	Votes	%	±%
Labor	George Edwin Yates	10,418	84.33	+18.18
Single Tax League	Edward Craigie	1,936	15.67	+11.21
Total formal votes		12,354	99.26	+5.57
Informal votes		92	0.74	−5.57
Turnout		12,446	36.97	−38.96
Labor hold		Swing	+18.18	

==== 1913 ====
1913 Australian federal election: Adelaide
Party	Candidate	Votes	%	±%
Labor	Ernest Roberts	15,985	66.1	+2.8
Liberal	James Craig	7,104	29.4	−7.3
Independent	Edward Craigie	1,077	4.6	+4.6
Total formal votes		24,166	93.7	
Informal votes		1,626	6.3	
Turnout		25,792	75.9	
Labor hold		Swing	+5.1	

==== 1910 ====
1910 Australian federal election: Adelaide
Party	Candidate	Votes	%	±%
Labour	Ernest Roberts	9,443	63.3	+63.3
Liberal	Alexander McLachlan	5,466	36.7	−63.3
Total formal votes		14,909	97.0	
Informal votes		457	3.0	
Turnout		15,366	53.2	
Labour hold		Swing	+63.3	

=== Elections in the 1900s ===
==== 1908 ====
Adelaide by-election, 1908
Party	Candidate	Votes	%	±%
Labour	Ernest Roberts	5,121	51.17	+51.17
Ind. Anti-Socialist	Alexander McLachlan	4,887	48.83	+48.83
Total formal votes		10,008	99.40	N/A
Informal votes		60	0.60	N/A
Registered electors		29,874		
Turnout		10,068	33.70	N/A
Labour gain from Protectionist				

==== 1906 ====
1906 Australian federal election: Adelaide
Party	Candidate	Votes	%	±%
Protectionist	Charles Kingston	unopposed		
Protectionist hold		Swing		

==== 1903 ====
1903 Australian federal election: Adelaide
Party	Candidate	Votes	%	±%
Protectionist	Charles Kingston	unopposed		
Protectionist win		(new seat)		
