= Results of the 1993 Australian federal election in South Australia =

1993 Australian federal election (South Australia)
- 13 March 1993

All 12 South Australia seats in the Australian House of Representatives and 6 seats in the Australian Senate

	First party	Second party
Leader	John Hewson	Paul Keating
Party	Liberal/National coalition	Labor
Last election	6 seats	7 seats
Seats won	8 seats	4 seats
Seat change	▲2	▼3
Popular vote	424,565	358,707
Percentage	46.0%	38.8%
Swing	▲3.3	▲0.9
TPP	52.67%	47.33%
TPP swing	▲1.27	▼1.27

This is a list of electoral division results for the Australian 1993 federal election in the state of South Australia.

== Overall results ==
Turnout 94.9% (CV) — Informal 4.1%
Party	Votes	%	Swing	Seats	Change
Liberal	421,687	45.65	3.00	8	▲2
National	2,878	0.31	0.31		Steady
Liberal/National Coalition	424,565	45.96	3.31	8	▲2
Labor	358,707	38.84	0.89	4	▼3
Democrats	71,981	7.79	-7.37		
Independents	43,317	4.69	3.39		
Natural Law	13,592	1.47			
Call to Australia	8,134	0.88			
Grey Power	1,759	0.19			
Greens	1,496	0.16	-0.05		
Confederate Action	124	0.01			
Total	923,645			12	
Two-party-preferred vote
Liberal/National Coalition	485,892	52.67	1.27	8	▲2
Labor	436,650	47.33	-1.27	4	▼3
Invalid/blank votes	39,088	4.06	+0.38		
Turnout	962,763	94.91			
Registered voters	1,014,400				
Source: Federal Elections 1993

== Results by division ==
=== Adelaide ===
1993 Australian federal election: Adelaide
Party	Candidate	Votes	%	±%
Liberal	Trish Worth	34,296	44.82	+3.71
Labor	Bob Catley	31,459	41.11	+1.70
Democrats	Matthew Mitchell	6,451	8.43	−5.91
Independent	Jack King	1,624	2.12	+2.12
Natural Law	Peter Fenwick	1,514	1.98	+1.98
	Adam Hanieh	558	0.73	+0.73
Independent	Chris Matuhina	318	0.42	+0.42
Independent	David Bidstrup	295	0.39	+0.39
Total formal votes		76,515	95.86	−0.30
Informal votes		3,304	4.14	+0.30
Turnout		79,819	93.37	
Two-party-preferred result
Liberal	Trish Worth	39,188	51.31	+3.15
Labor	Bob Catley	37,181	48.69	−3.15
Liberal gain from Labor		Swing	+3.15	

=== Barker ===
1993 Australian federal election: Barker
Party	Candidate	Votes	%	±%
Liberal	Ian McLachlan	46,667	60.37	+2.63
Labor	Harry Early	19,939	25.79	−2.22
Democrats	Regine Andersen	4,742	6.13	−5.44
Natural Law	Chris Wells	1,784	2.31	+2.31
Call to Australia	Deidre Kent	1,548	2.00	+1.06
Independent	Francis Boylan	1,399	1.81	+1.81
Independent	Stephen Wikblom	1,221	1.58	+1.58
Total formal votes		77,300	96.44	−0.57
Informal votes		2,857	3.56	+0.57
Turnout		80,157	95.71	
Two-party-preferred result
Liberal	Ian McLachlan	50,928	65.97	+2.27
Labor	Harry Early	26,265	34.03	−2.27
Liberal hold		Swing	+2.27	

=== Bonython ===
1993 Australian federal election: Bonython
Party	Candidate	Votes	%	±%
Labor	Neal Blewett	38,820	55.60	+3.52
Liberal	Ian Brookfield	20,032	28.69	+2.30
Democrats	Colin Maas	6,596	9.45	−8.80
Independent	Tony Rocca	1,994	2.86	+2.86
Call to Australia	Dennis Hood	1,099	1.57	−1.71
Natural Law	Eamon McAleer	667	0.96	+0.96
Independent	Bruce Hannaford	615	0.88	+0.88
Total formal votes		69,823	94.75	−0.21
Informal votes		3,870	5.25	+0.21
Turnout		73,693	94.63	
Two-party-preferred result
Labor	Neal Blewett	45,174	64.75	−0.92
Liberal	Ian Brookfield	24,598	35.25	+0.92
Labor hold		Swing	−0.92	

=== Boothby ===
1993 Australian federal election: Boothby
Party	Candidate	Votes	%	±%
Liberal	Steele Hall	41,708	52.88	+7.89
Labor	Cathy Orr	26,556	33.67	+1.63
Democrats	David Thackrah	7,560	9.59	−9.36
Natural Law	Bevan Morris	1,650	2.09	+2.09
Independent	Reg Macey	1,399	1.77	+1.77
Total formal votes		78,873	97.37	+0.12
Informal votes		2,129	2.63	−0.12
Turnout		81,002	95.27	
Two-party-preferred result
Liberal	Steele Hall	45,557	57.80	+3.29
Labor	Cathy Orr	33,266	42.20	−3.29
Liberal hold		Swing	+3.29	

=== Grey ===
1993 Australian federal election: Grey
Party	Candidate	Votes	%	±%
Liberal	Barry Wakelin	34,703	44.28	+4.25
Labor	Barry Piltz	29,963	38.23	−5.34
Independent	George Crowe	6,248	7.97	+7.97
National	Rod Nettle	2,878	3.67	+3.67
Democrats	Matthew Rogers	2,318	2.96	−4.86
Call to Australia	Anne Wilson	813	1.04	−5.85
Natural Law	Colin Vincent	445	0.57	+0.57
Independent	Jeff Munchenberg	354	0.45	+0.45
Independent	John Fisher	307	0.39	−0.14
Independent	Peter Solomon	220	0.28	+0.28
Confederate Action	Roger Oates	124	0.16	+0.16
Total formal votes		78,373	95.88	−0.96
Informal votes		3,365	4.12	+0.96
Turnout		81,738	94.62	
Two-party-preferred result
Liberal	Barry Wakelin	40,729	52.08	+4.11
Labor	Barry Piltz	37,483	47.92	−4.11
Liberal gain from Labor		Swing	+4.11	

=== Hindmarsh ===
1993 Australian federal election: Hindmarsh
Party	Candidate	Votes	%	±%
Liberal	Chris Gallus	38,117	47.68	+5.58
Labor	John Rau	32,814	41.05	+0.32
Democrats	Mark Lobban	3,855	4.82	−7.93
Natural Law	Athena Yiossis	1,602	2.00	+2.00
Greens	Bob Lamb	1,496	1.87	+1.87
Independent	Cliff Boyd	579	0.72	+0.72
Grey Power	Martin Stretton	577	0.72	−1.21
Independent	Ron Dean	477	0.60	+0.60
Democratic Socialist	Melanie Sjoberg	418	0.52	+0.52
Total formal votes		79,935	95.11	−0.72
Informal votes		4,111	4.89	+0.72
Turnout		84,046	94.65	
Two-party-preferred result
Liberal	Chris Gallus	41,245	51.64	+2.61
Labor	John Rau	38,627	48.36	−2.61
Liberal gain from Labor		Swing	+2.61	

=== Kingston ===
1993 Australian federal election: Kingston
Party	Candidate	Votes	%	±%
Labor	Gordon Bilney	33,906	44.45	+7.45
Liberal	Martin Gordon	32,073	42.04	+7.76
Democrats	Anji Gesserit	5,885	7.71	−17.51
Call to Australia	John Watson	1,917	2.51	+0.13
Natural Law	Robert Brown	976	1.28	+1.28
Independent	Alexa Jamieson	908	1.19	+1.19
Independent	Egils Burtmanis	427	0.56	+0.56
	Robert Graham	194	0.25	+0.25
Total formal votes		76,286	96.45	+0.00
Informal votes		2,806	3.55	+0.00
Turnout		79,092	95.86	
Two-party-preferred result
Labor	Gordon Bilney	39,212	51.45	−2.85
Liberal	Martin Gordon	37,000	48.55	+2.85
Labor hold		Swing	−2.85	

=== Makin ===
1993 Australian federal election: Makin
Party	Candidate	Votes	%	±%
Labor	Peter Duncan	36,748	46.79	+5.49
Liberal	Alan Irving	32,353	41.19	+2.87
Democrats	Angela Smith	5,585	7.11	−8.60
Independent	Eva Dobson	986	1.26	+1.26
Call to Australia	Dorothy Durland	986	1.26	−1.97
Natural Law	Susan Brown	844	1.07	+1.07
Independent	Alf Taylor	745	0.95	+0.95
Independent	Stan Batten	294	0.37	+0.37
Total formal votes		78,541	96.36	+0.14
Informal votes		2,966	3.64	−0.14
Turnout		81,507	95.91	
Two-party-preferred result
Labor	Peter Duncan	42,155	53.70	+0.28
Liberal	Alan Irving	36,339	46.30	−0.28
Labor hold		Swing	+0.28	

=== Mayo ===
1993 Australian federal election: Mayo
Party	Candidate	Votes	%	±%
Liberal	Alexander Downer	42,647	53.98	+3.43
Labor	Patrick Scott	21,601	27.33	+0.42
Democrats	Merilyn Pedrick	10,731	13.58	−5.81
Independent	Elena Lomsargis	1,322	1.67	+1.67
Natural Law	Pamela Chipperfield	1,209	1.53	+1.53
Call to Australia	Philippe Bayet	988	1.25	−1.09
Independent	Michael Camilleri	523	0.66	+0.66
Total formal votes		79,031	96.64	−0.23
Informal votes		2,751	3.36	+0.23
Turnout		81,782	95.18	
Two-party-preferred result
Liberal	Alexander Downer	47,827	60.60	+1.01
Labor	Patrick Scott	31,097	39.40	−1.01
Liberal hold		Swing	+1.01	

=== Port Adelaide ===
1993 Australian federal election: Port Adelaide
Party	Candidate	Votes	%	±%
Labor	Rod Sawford	41,248	53.47	+1.11
Liberal	Alan McCarthy	25,437	33.00	+0.66
Democrats	Don Knott	5,235	6.79	−5.29
Independent	Colin Shearing	2,473	3.21	+3.21
Grey Power	Emily Gilbey-Riley	1,182	1.53	+1.09
Natural Law	Andrew Hobbs	830	1.08	+1.08
Independent	Bert Joy	719	0.93	+0.93
Total formal votes		77,144	94.73	−0.55
Informal votes		4,288	5.27	+0.55
Turnout		81,432	94.36	
Two-party-preferred result
Labor	Rod Sawford	47,811	62.05	−0.35
Liberal	Alan McCarthy	29,246	37.95	+0.35
Labor hold		Swing	−0.35	

=== Sturt ===
1993 Australian federal election: Sturt
Party	Candidate	Votes	%	±%
Liberal	Christopher Pyne	29,121	39.41	−7.58
Labor	Marco de Chellis	25,293	34.23	+0.16
	Mike Pratt	10,756	14.56	+14.56
Democrats	Elizabeth Williams	6,085	8.23	−6.47
Natural Law	Vladimir Lorenzon	1,167	1.58	+1.58
Call to Australia	Tom Curnow	783	1.06	−0.64
Independent	Geoff Freer	689	0.93	+0.93
Total formal votes		73,894	95.55	−0.56
Informal votes		3,439	4.45	+0.56
Turnout		77,333	93.71	
Two-party-preferred result
Liberal	Christopher Pyne	41,123	55.71	+1.04
Labor	Martin de Chellis	32,690	44.29	−1.04
Liberal hold		Swing	+1.04	

=== Wakefield ===
1993 Australian federal election: Wakefield
Party	Candidate	Votes	%	±%
Liberal	Neil Andrew	44,503	57.08	+2.69
Labor	Mike Stevens	20,360	26.12	−2.82
Democrats	Roy Milne	6,938	8.90	−4.28
Independent	Don Allen	3,189	4.09	+4.09
Independent	Shirley Faulkner	2,066	2.65	+2.65
Natural Law	Ingrid Hergstrom	904	1.16	+1.16
Total formal votes		77,960	96.05	−0.72
Informal votes		3,202	3.95	+0.72
Turnout		81,162	95.66	
Two-party-preferred result
Liberal	Neil Andrew	52,112	66.98	+4.91
Labor	Mike Stevens	25,689	33.02	−4.91
Liberal hold		Swing	+4.91	

== See also ==
- Results of the 1993 Australian federal election (House of Representatives)
- Members of the Australian House of Representatives, 1993–1996
