= 1988 Adelaide by-election =

- 6 February 1988

Division of Adelaide (SA) in the House of Representatives

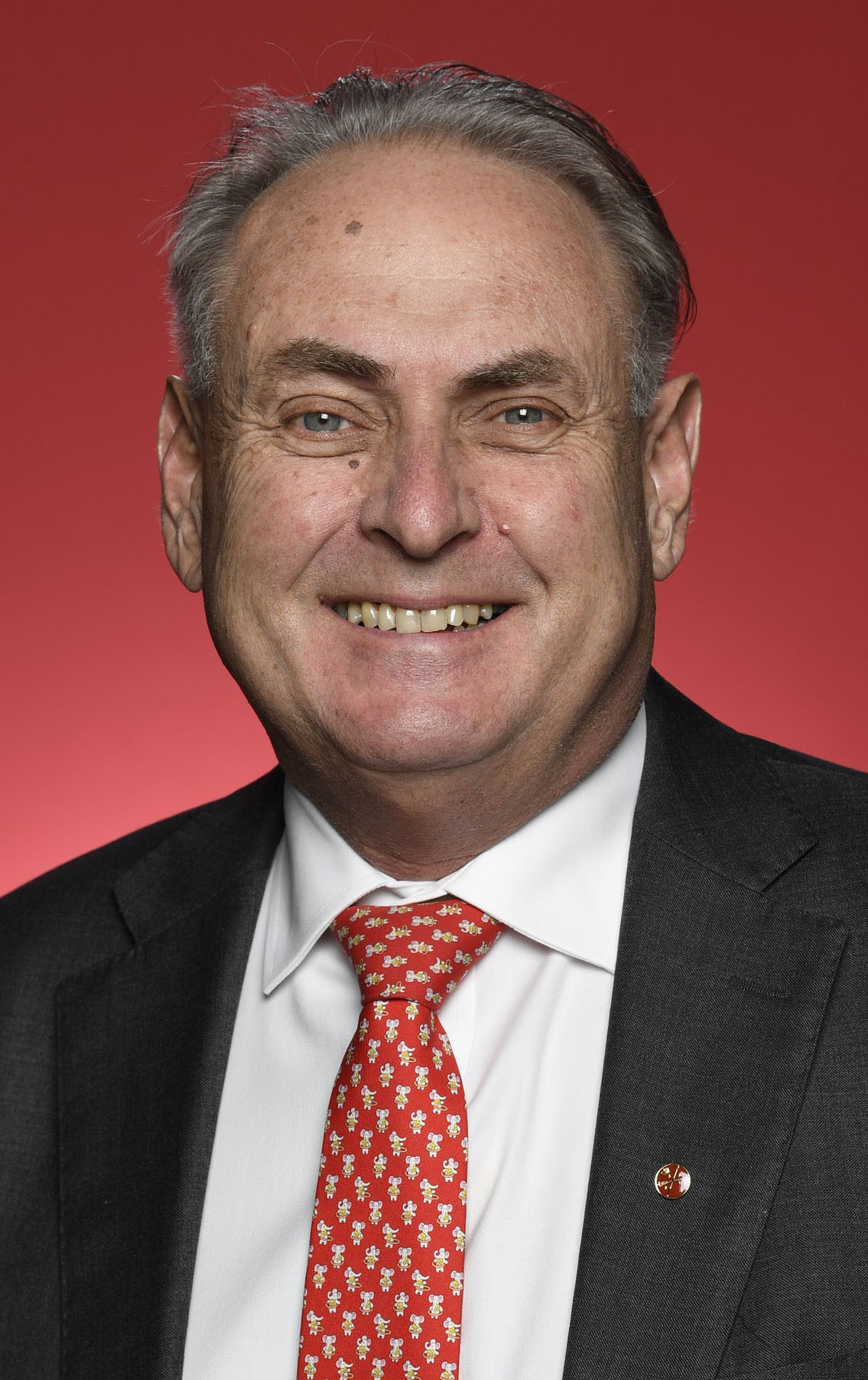
	First party	Second party	Third party
			DEM
Candidate	Mike Pratt	Don Farrell	Ian McLeish
Party	Liberal	Labor	Democrats
Primary vote	26,777	22,897	7,097
Percentage	44.4%	38.0%	11.8%
Swing	▲8.9	▼10.9	▲2.7
TPP	51.9%	48.2%
TPP swing	▲8.4	▼8.4
MP before election
Chris Hurford
Labor
Elected MP
Mike Pratt
Liberal

A by-election was held for the Australian House of Representatives seat of Adelaide on 6 February 1988. This was triggered by the resignation of Labor Party MP Chris Hurford to become Australia's Consul-General in New York City.

The election was won by Liberal candidate Mike Pratt with an 8.4 percent two-party-preferred swing on a 1.9 percent margin, defeating Labor candidate Don Farrell.

The 1988 Port Adelaide by-election occurred seven weeks later.

== Candidates ==
- Independent – Bronwyn Mewett
- Independent – Peter Consandine, republican campaigner who later founded the Republican Party of Australia
- Independent – Michael Brander
- Independent – John Litten
- Australian Democrats – Ian McLeish
- Unite Australia Party – Dorothy McGregor-Dey, who contested Mayo for the party in 1987
- National Party of Australia – Bryan Stokes, the party's 1987 candidate
- Australian Labor Party – Don Farrell, assistant secretary of the Shop, Distributive and Allied Employees Association (SDA). Farrell was later influential in the South Australian Labor Party, and serves in the Senate (2016–present), having served previously from 2008 to 2014
- Liberal Party of Australia – Mike Pratt, a local farmer

== Campaign ==
The proposed introduction of time-based billing for local telephone calls was reportedly a major issue in the campaign. The intended change by government-owned telecommunications monopoly Telecom Australia was announced early in the campaign and was subsequently endorsed by Prime Minister Bob Hawke, who then faced "a backlash from its own left wing, unions and the public". The Liberal Party campaigned heavily on the issue and Liberal candidate Mike Pratt "had a largel model of a telephone receiver placed on the roof of his campaign van to help push home the party message".

== Results ==
Adelaide by-election, 1988
Party	Candidate	Votes	%	±%
Liberal	Mike Pratt	26,777	44.4	+8.9
Labor	Don Farrell	22,897	38.0	−10.9
Democrats	Ian McLeish	7,097	11.8	+2.7
Independent	Bronwyn Mewett	1,408	2.3	+2.3
National	Bryan Stokes	1,000	1.7	−3.4
Independent	Michael Brander	409	0.9	+0.9
Independent	John Litten	367	0.6	+0.6
Unite Australia	Dorothy McGregor-Dey	218	0.4	+0.4
Republican	Peter Consandine	104	0.2	+0.2
Total formal votes		60,277	96.1	
Informal votes		2,432	3.9	
Turnout		62,709	88.0	
Two-party-preferred result
Liberal	Mike Pratt	31,195	51.9	+8.4
Labor	Don Farrell	28,967	48.2	−8.4
Liberal gain from Labor		Swing	+8.4	

== See also ==
- List of Australian federal by-elections
