= Economic Cooperation and Trade Agreement =

India -Australia trade pact

"Economic Cooperation and Trade Agreement" is the first trade agreement between India and Australia. Piyush Goyal Union Minister of Commerce and Industry, Consumer Affairs, Food and Public Distribution and Textiles said while addressing a press conference on the ECTA. Australia has approved the trade pact between these two countries in its Parliament.

== Bilateral relations ==
India signed the "Economic Cooperation and Trade Agreement" with the earlier Australian Prime Minister Scott Morrison. Indian Prime Minister Narendra Modi and Australian Prime Minister Anthony Albanese along with commerce minister, Piyush Goyal and Don Farrell trade, tourism and investment minister of Australia struck the first trade deal in a decade. Piyush Goyal union minister of commerce and industry shared the news after Prime Minister of Australia, Anthony Albanese confirmed the passing of the trade agreement by the Australian Parliament.

== Impact of the trade pact ==
- Australia offered to eliminate duties on 100 percent tariff lines under the agreement.
- The bilateral trade agreement is estimated to increase from the present $31 billion to $45 to 50 billion in another five years.
- The trade pact will provide a fillip to the Gems and Jewellery sector of India, which are export-oriented.
