= Joe Sexton =

Australian politician

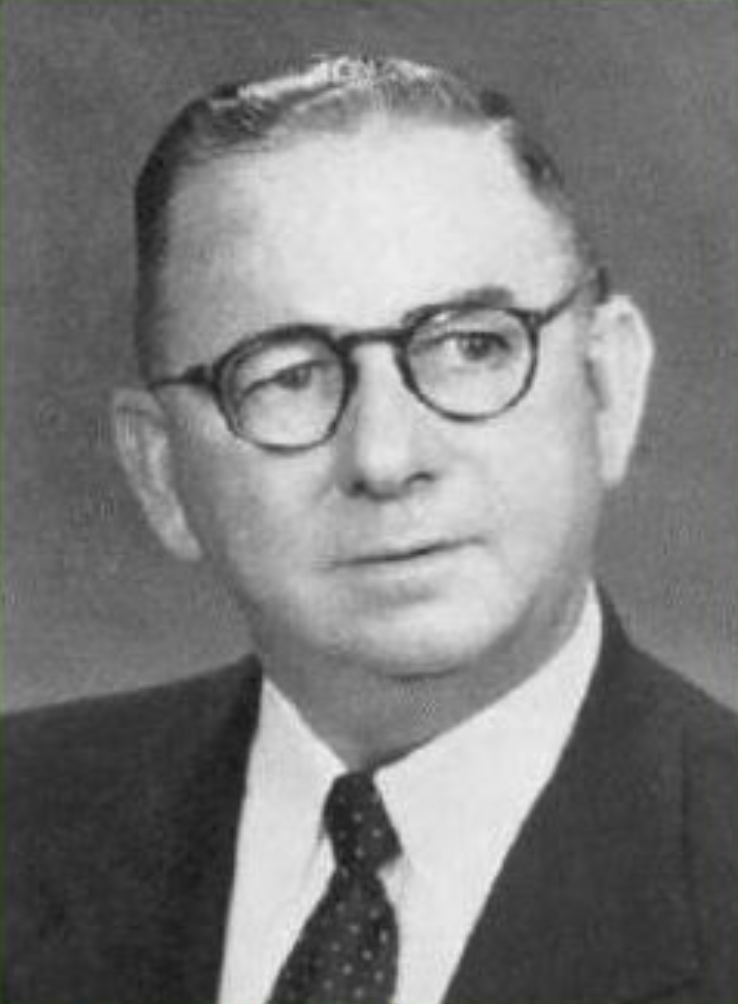

Member of the Australian Parliament for Adelaide
- In office 22 November 1958 – 26 November 1966
- Preceded by: Cyril Chambers
- Succeeded by: Andrew Jones

Personal details
- Born: Joseph Clement Leonard Sexton; 24 November 1905 Strathalbyn, South Australia
- Died: 21 April 1974 (aged 68) New Zealand
- Party: Australian Labor Party
- Spouse: Gertrude Sexton (formerly Williams)
- Children: 5 (Brenda, Brian, John, Margaret & Monica)

Joseph Clement Leonard Sexton (24 November 1905 – 21 April 1974) was a Labor member of the Australian House of Representatives from 1958 to 1966, representing the Division of Adelaide, South Australia.

Sexton gained preselection for Adelaide after sitting MP Cyril Chambers was expelled from the Labor Party for attacking the then leadership of H. V. Evatt in August 1957.

Sexton was defeated by Liberal candidate Andrew Jones at the 1966 federal election. He unsuccessfully sought Labor preselection to re-contest the seat in 1968, but was defeated by Chris Hurford.

Sexton died of a heart attack while on holiday in New Zealand in 1974.

== Notes ==
Parliament of Australia
Preceded by Cyril Chambers	Member for Adelaide; 1958–1966	Succeeded by Andrew Jones
