= 1914 Adelaide by-election =

← 1913	10 January 1914	1914 →

Division of Adelaide (SA) in the House of Representatives
- Registered: 33,662
- Turnout: 36.97% (▼38.96)
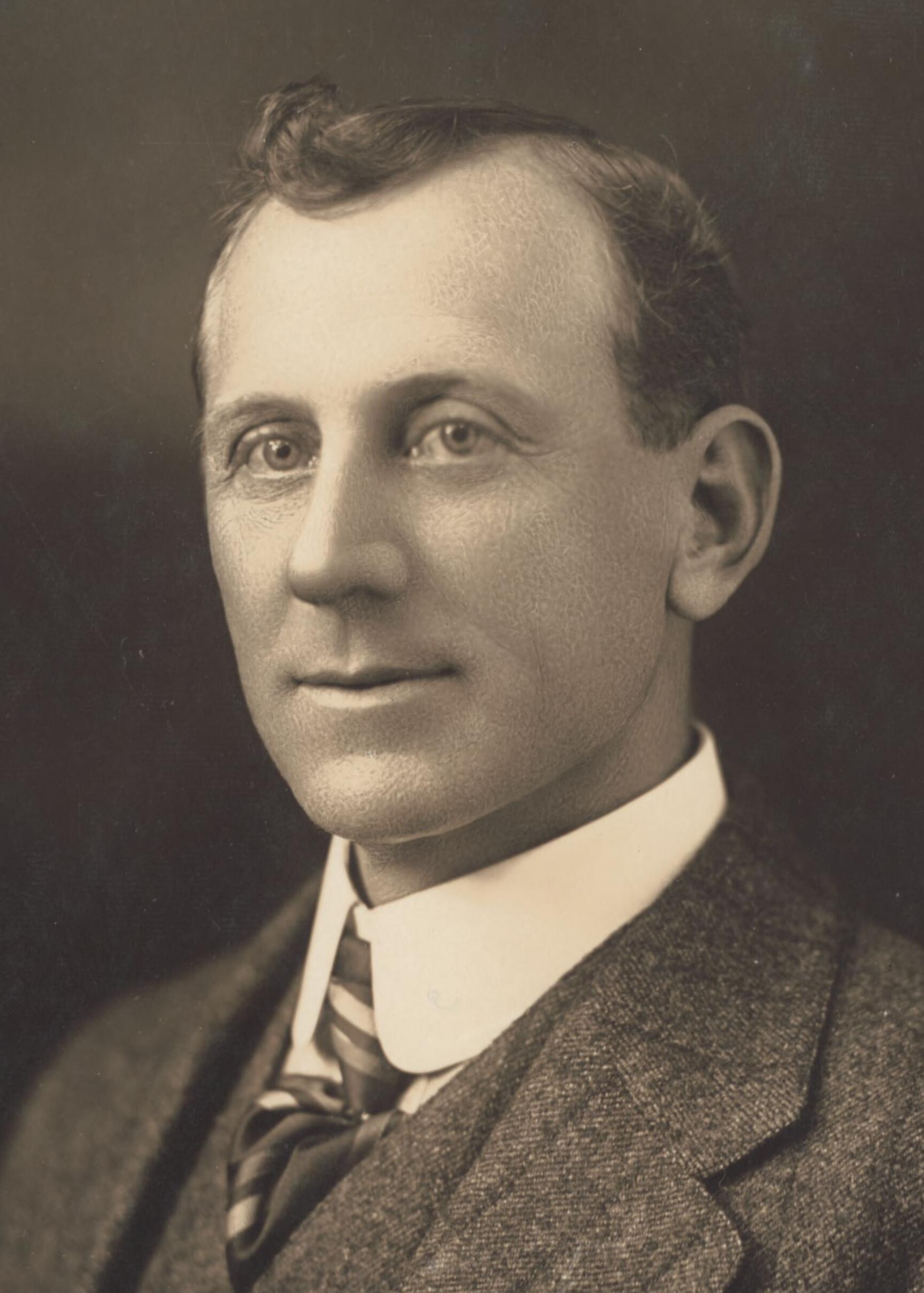

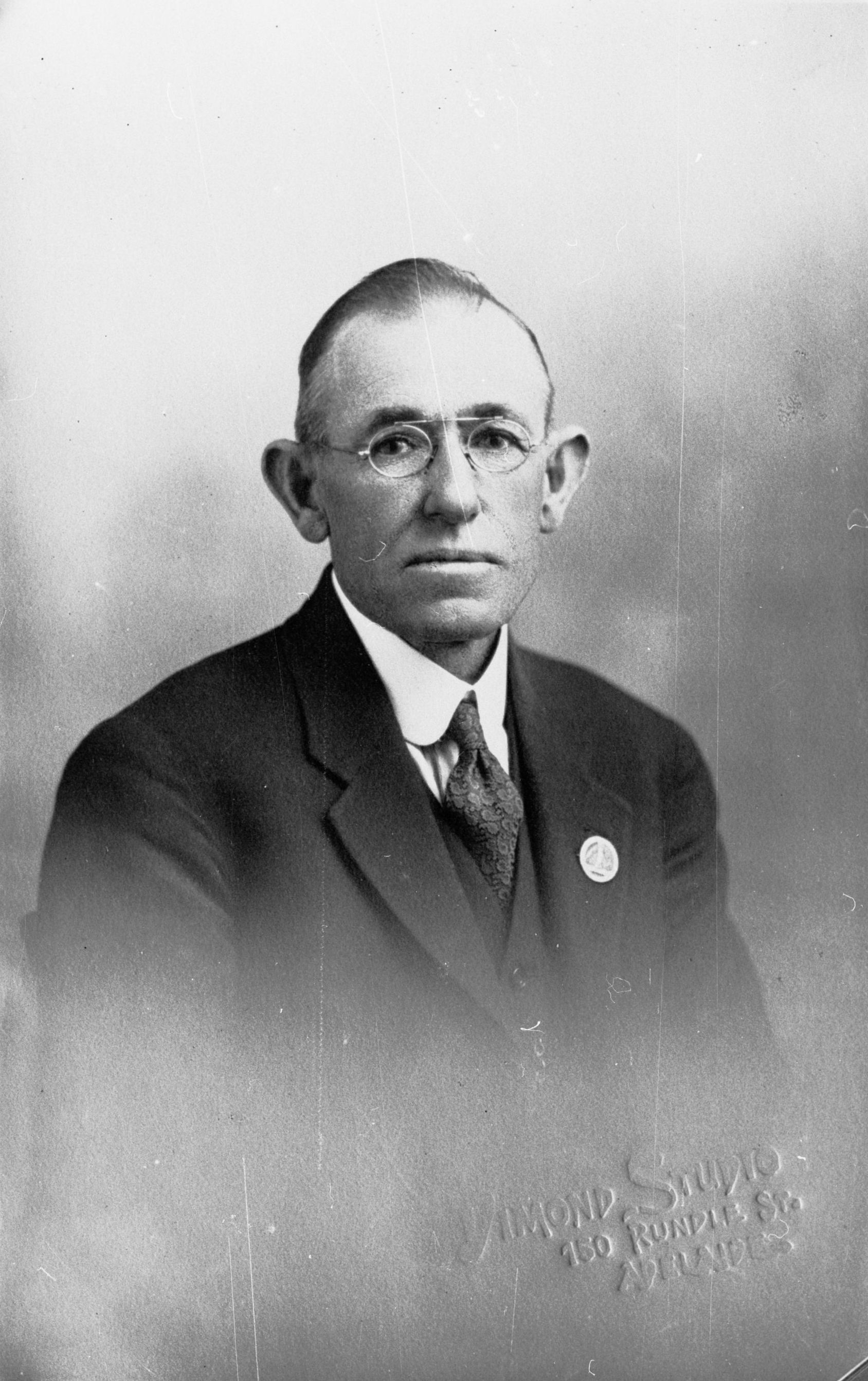
	First party	Second party
Candidate	George Edwin Yates	Edward Craigie
Party	Labor	Single Tax League
Popular vote	10,418	1,936
Percentage	84.33%	15.67%
Swing	▲18.18	▲11.21
MP before election
Ernest Roberts
Labor
Elected MP
George Edwin Yates
Labor

A by-election was held for the Australian House of Representatives seat of Adelaide on 10 January 1914. This was triggered by the death of Labor Party MP Ernest Roberts.

The by-election was won by Labor Party candidate George Edwin Yates. Single Tax League candidate Edward Craigie had previously contested the seat at the 1913 federal election as an independent candidate, achieving 4.6 percent of the vote. Voting was not compulsory in 1914.

== Results ==
1914 Adelaide by-election
Party	Candidate	Votes	%	±%
Labor	George Edwin Yates	10,418	84.33	+18.18
Single Tax League	Edward Craigie	1,936	15.67	+11.21
Total formal votes		12,354	99.26	+5.57
Informal votes		92	0.74	−5.57
Turnout		12,446	36.97	−38.96
Labor hold		Swing	+18.18	

== See also ==
- List of Australian federal by-elections
