= Andrew Jones (Australian politician) =

Australian politician

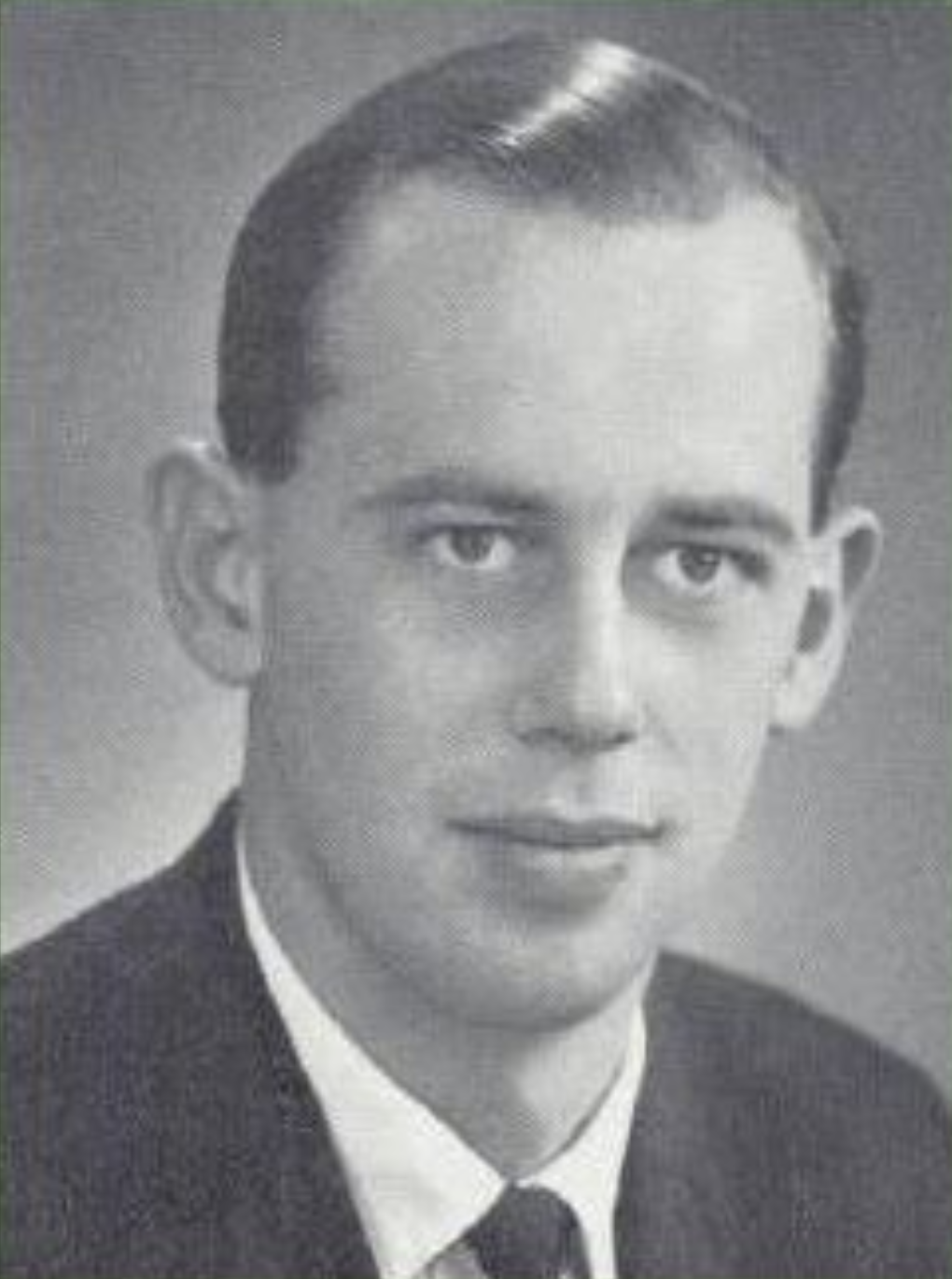

Member of the Australian Parliament for Adelaide
- In office 26 November 1966 – 25 October 1969
- Preceded by: Joe Sexton
- Succeeded by: Chris Hurford

Personal details
- Born: 26 May 1944 Adelaide, South Australia
- Died: 2 December 2015 (aged 71)
- Party: Liberal Party of Australia
- Education: University of Adelaide
- Occupation: Travel officer

Andrew Thomas Jones (26 May 1944 – 2 December 2015) was an Australian politician. He became one of the youngest ever Australian federal Members of Parliament when he was elected to the Division of Adelaide on 26 November 1966, aged just 22 years and 184 days. At that time, only Edwin Corboy had been elected at a younger age, but that record has since been broken by Wyatt Roy.

Born in Adelaide, Jones studied at the University of Adelaide and was working as a travel officer when he gained Liberal and Country League (LCL) preselection for the apparently safe Labor seat of Adelaide for the 1966 federal election. Although the election came at a bad time for Labor at both the federal and state level, few gave Jones any chance of winning. However, much to the surprise of everyone except Jones, he defeated Labor incumbent Joe Sexton. He took a narrow lead on the first count, but received an overwhelming flow of Democratic Labor Party preferences on the second count, enough for a 10 percent two-party preferred swing and 52.8 percent of the vote.

Jones ruffled feathers with his views, which were extremely conservative even by general LCL standards of the time. For instance, he called alcohol "the devil's urine", and claimed that "half the MPs in Parliament are drunk half the time". He was forced to publicly apologise on the floor of the House for the latter remarks. Jones caused further controversy by releasing a book, entitled Andrew Jones M.H.R by Himself, in which he made further comments on the "wickedness" of parliament, as well as a spoken word record.

The spoken-word record, Shadow Valley and Iron Triangles by "The Young Australians", described by Jones as "anti-Communist", by his supporters as "a reaction against the spate of sick immoral and depraved pseudo-folk music which pours from the radio" and by detractors as "awful" or "pure jingoism", was a local Adelaide hit for Jones, who donated the proceeds to charity. It included such lines as "When you hear the anthem lift up your head, remember our past, see our glorious future and let your voice sing out, and friend, thank God you're free." At least one Adelaide radio announcer refused to play the song.

Jones' conservatism didn't play well in what was an ancestrally Labor seat. He was resoundingly defeated by Labor challenger Chris Hurford at the 1969 election, suffering a 14.3 percent two-party swing to finish with 38.7 percent of the two-party vote. Hurford won enough votes on the first count to defeat Jones without the need for preferences. Following the loss, Jones's reasoning to Prime Minister John Gorton for his defeat, "not even Jesus Christ could have held Adelaide", quickly entered Australian political folklore. Jones later unsuccessfully ran as an independent candidate for the Senate at the 1977 federal election before moving to Western Australia and assuming a low profile.

== Publications ==
Jones, Andrew, 1944- (1967), Andrew Jones MHR / by Himself; illustrated by Paul Rigby, Rigby

Parliament of Australia
Preceded by Joe Sexton	Member for Adelaide; 1966–1969	Succeeded by Chris Hurford
