= Cyril Chambers =

Australian politician (1897–1975)

The Honourable Cyril Chambers CBE
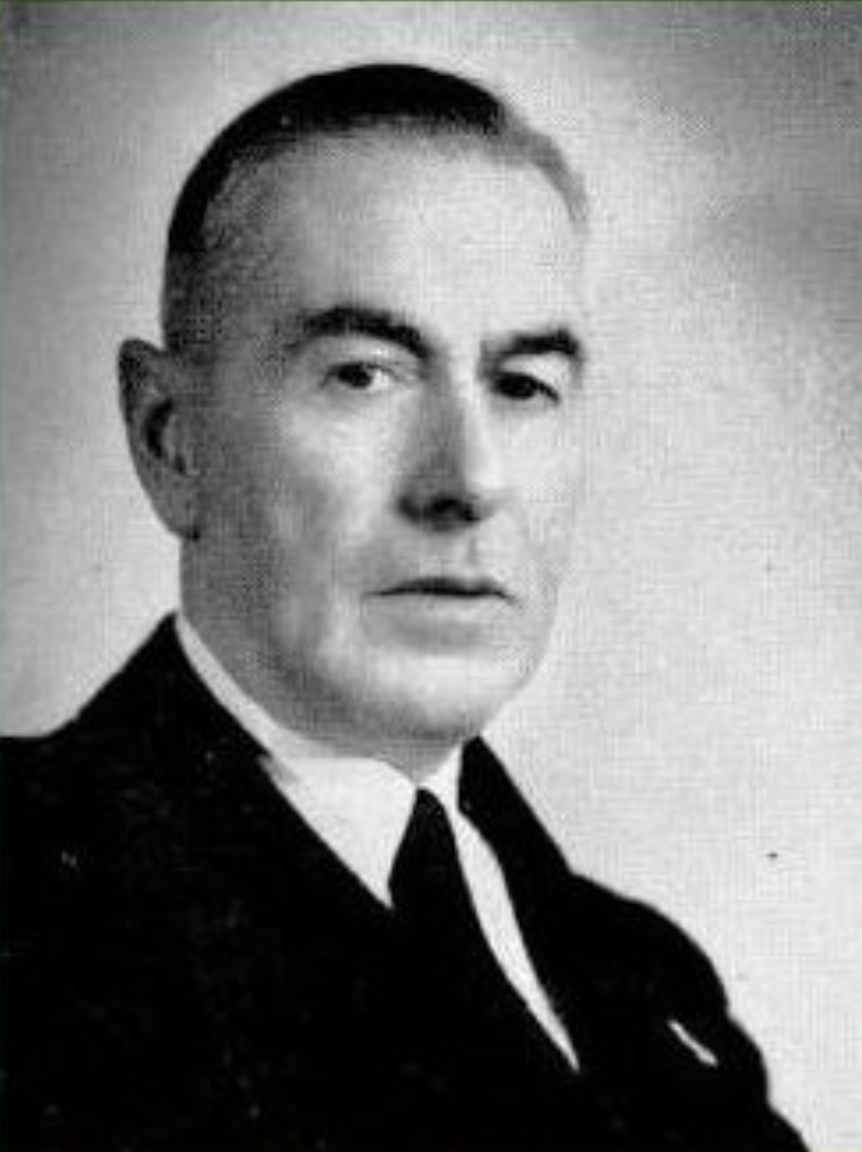

Minister for the Army
- In office 1 November 1946 – 19 December 1949
- Prime Minister: Ben Chifley
- Preceded by: Frank Forde
- Succeeded by: Josiah Francis

Member of the Australian Parliament for Adelaide
- In office 21 August 1943 – 14 October 1958
- Preceded by: Fred Stacey
- Succeeded by: Joe Sexton

Personal details
- Born: 28 February 1897 Thebarton, South Australia
- Died: 3 October 1975 (aged 78) Hawthorn, South Australia
- Party: Labor (to 1957; after 1958); Independent (1957–58)
- Spouses: Hilda Mummery (m. 1938–1943) Salamas Rickman (m. 1949–1954) Janet Pullen (m. 1956)
- Occupation: Dentist

Cyril Chambers CBE (1897–1975) was an Australian politician who served as a member of the House of Representatives from 1943 to 1958, representing the Labor Party. He was Minister for the Army in the Chifley government from 1946 to 1949.

== Early life ==
Chambers was born in the Adelaide suburb of Thebarton on 28 February 1897. He was educated at St John the Baptist's School, Thebarton, and Hayward's Academy, Adelaide. In 1919 he became a dentist. He was mayor of Henley and Grange from 1932 to 1934. In 1938, he married Hilda Dorothy Mummery. During World War II, he served in the 3rd Field Ambulance in New Guinea, but was soon invalided back to Adelaide.

== Political career ==
Chambers was elected as the Labor member of the House of Representatives seat of Adelaide at the 1943 election and was appointed Minister for the Army following the 1946 election in the second Chifley ministry. In July 1949 he ordered troops to mine coal in the New South Wales to break a strike by the then communist-influenced Australian Coal and Shale Employees' Federation. The Labor government lost power at the 1949 election.

Chambers' first wife had died in 1943 and in December 1949, he married a divorcee, Salamas Rickman, despite his generally strict Catholicism. She died in 1954 and in October 1956 he married Janet Sanderson Pullen. In 1951, he refused to take part in Labor's campaign against the 1951 anti-communist referendum and would have been expelled from the party except for the intervention of party leader H.V. Evatt.

On 8 August 1957, Chambers publicly called on Evatt to resign as party leader, accusing him of "fomenting discord wherever he goes" and of contributing to the party's loss at the 1957 Queensland state election. On 27 August he announced his intention to move a motion of no confidence in Evatt's leadership. However, on 19 September he was expelled from the ALP by the state council of the South Australian branch.

Chambers sat as an independent until 16 June 1958, when he was re-admitted to the Labor Party. By that time Joe Sexton had already won preselection for Adelaide at the 1958 federal election. It was too late for Chambers to nominate for another seat, and he was forced to retire.

== Later life ==
Chambers worked as an immigration selection officer in Belfast, Rome and Scotland from 1959 to 1962 and then worked in Adelaide as a welfare consultant. In 1968, he was made a Commander of the Order of the British Empire (CBE). He died in Hawthorn, South Australia, survived by his third wife, but he had no children.

== Notes ==
Political offices
Preceded by Frank Forde	Minister for the Army; 1946–1949	Succeeded by Josiah Francis
Parliament of Australia
Preceded by Fred Stacey	Member for Adelaide; 1943–1958	Succeeded by Joe Sexton
