= Unite Australia Party =

Former political party

- Abbreviation: UAP
- Leader: John Siddons
- Founded: December 1986
- Registered: 21 January 1987
- Dissolved: 25 May 1990
- Split from: Australian Democrats
- Senate: 2 / 76 (1987)

The Unite Australia Party (UAP) was a short-lived Australian political party that existed in the late 1980s.

In December 1986, senator John Siddons, former deputy leader of the Australian Democrats, quit the Democrats to form the UAP, arguing that the party under leader Janine Haines had moved too far to the left on key issues and was no longer representative of small 'l' liberal values. Initially composed of disaffected Democrats, the UAP gained a boost when two other minor parties, the Advance Australia Party and the Australia Party agreed to amalgamate with the UAP, raising its national membership to around 5000. The UAP was registered as a political party on 21 January 1987 with Siddons claiming the party would become the new third force of Australian politics.

Siddons pledged that the UAP would lower taxes, stimulate the economy, protect small shop-owners from unfair competition, abolish compulsory unionism and would be an anti-uranium, pro-environment party. The party received another boost when Senator David Vigor (who had lost a pre-selection battle) also defected from the Democrats to the UAP, giving the UAP two sitting federal parliamentarians.

The party's first electoral test, the by-elections for the New South Wales Legislative Assembly districts of Bankstown and Heathcote in January 1987, provided concern for the party, producing less than 1% of the vote in both cases.

Undaunted, the UAP ran Senate candidates at the 1987 federal election in each of the mainland states as well as several lower house seats. The party performed worse than expected, polling 0.6% in South Australia, 0.5% in Victoria and 0.2% in New South Wales. In the 1988 Adelaide by-election, the UAP candidate polled only 0.4% of the vote.

Party support dwindled after the 1987 election and the UAP was deregistered on 25 May 1990.

Despite the similarity of the names, the Unite Australia Party was not connected to the United Australia Party, which was the forerunner to the Liberal Party of Australia.
