= Fred Stacey =

Australian politician

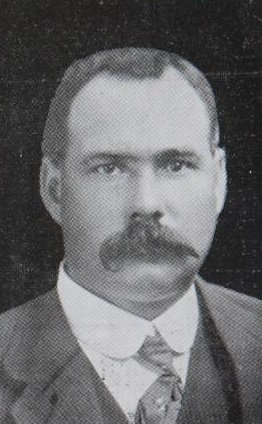

Member of the Australian Parliament for Adelaide
- In office 19 December 1931 – 21 August 1943
- Preceded by: George Edwin Yates
- Succeeded by: Cyril Chambers

Personal details
- Born: 6 August 1879 Carey Gully, South Australia
- Died: 17 September 1964 (aged 85)
- Party: United Australia Party
- Occupation: Various

Fred Hurtle Stacey (6 August 1879 – 17 September 1964) was an Australian politician. He was a United Australia Party member of the Australian House of Representatives from 1931 to 1943, representing the electorate of Adelaide.

He was born at Carey Gully, South Australia, the fourth son of Henry and Anne Stacey. He worked as a miner at Moonta and Wallaroo and in Western Australia, managed his father's orchard for a time, and became involved in the timber industry, owning the Lenswood Case and Timber Mills, which supplied timber to the mines and for fruit cases. He was involved in the local community at Uraidla, serving on the local show and school committees, but later retired from the timber business and moved to suburban Maylands. He was a Corporate Town of St Peters councillor from 1923 to 1925, an alderman from 1925 to 1928, and mayor from 1928 to 1932.

Stacey was elected to the House of Representatives at the 1931 federal election, defeating long-term Labor MP George Edwin Yates. He was re-elected in 1934, 1937 and 1940, the third time with a majority of 2,198. Stacey was defeated in the Labor victory at the 1943 federal election, although he had previously been reported as being "supremely confident" of retaining his seat.

Stacey moved to Klemzig after his parliamentary defeat, where he again ran an orchard. He later twice unsuccessfully contested Liberal and Country League preselection for state seats: in 1944 for Central District No. 2 in the Legislative Council, and in 1947 for the House of Assembly seat of Torrens.

Parliament of Australia
Preceded by George Edwin Yates	Member for Adelaide; 1931–1943	Succeeded by Cyril Chambers
