= George Edwin Yates =

Australian politician

Gunner Yates
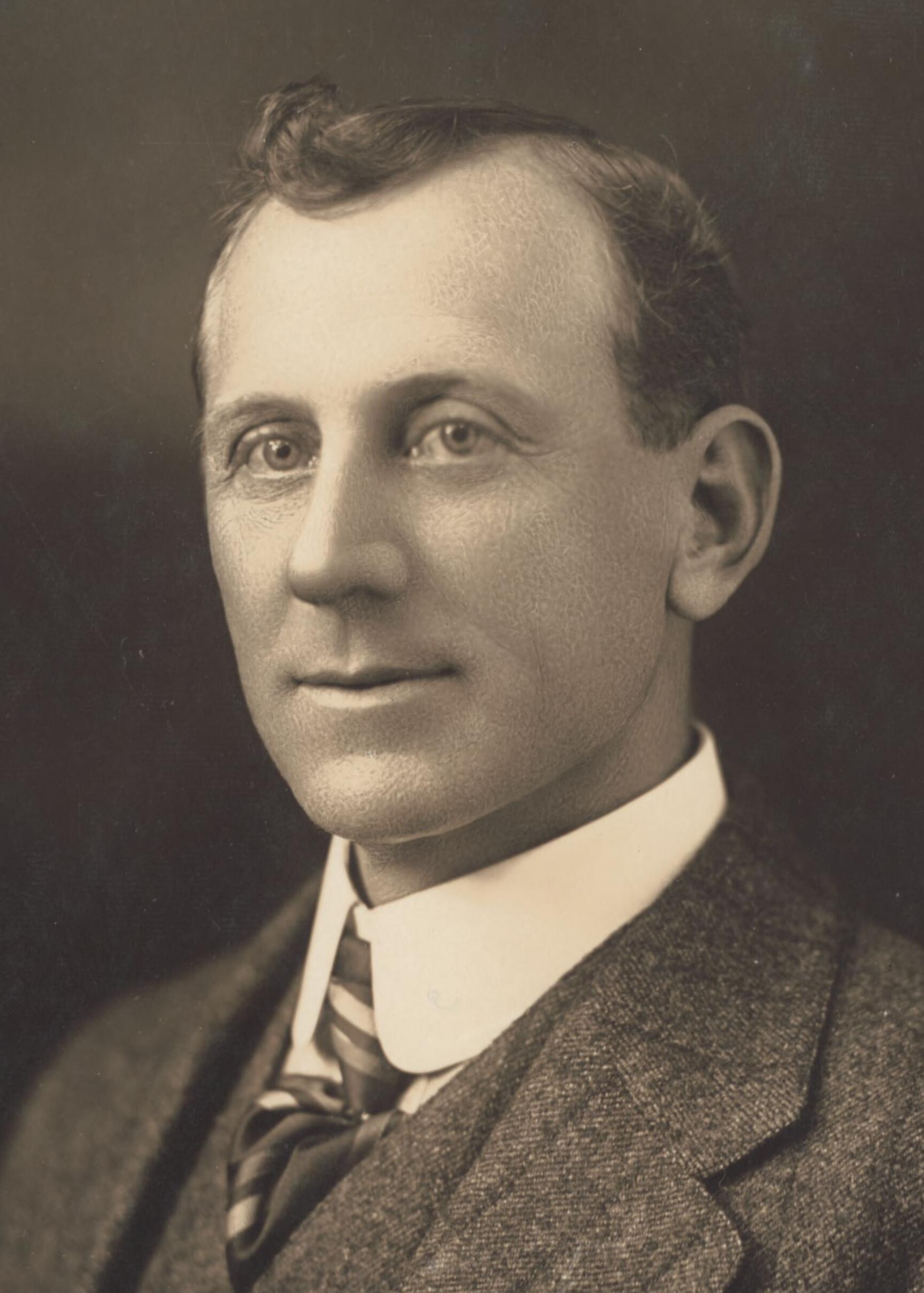

Member of the Australian Parliament for Adelaide
- In office 10 January 1914 – 13 December 1919
- Preceded by: Ernest Roberts
- Succeeded by: Reginald Blundell
- In office 16 December 1922 – 19 December 1931
- Preceded by: Reginald Blundell
- Succeeded by: Fred Stacey

Personal details
- Born: George Edwin Yates; 14 May 1871 Staffordshire, England
- Died: 16 July 1959 (aged 88) Prospect, South Australia
- Party: Australian Labor Party
- Spouse(s): Eveline Beaton; Lillie Padget

Military service
- Allegiance: Australia
- Branch/service: Australian Imperial Force
- Years of service: 1916–1919

George Edwin Yates (14 May 1871 – 16 July 1959), often referred to as Gunner Yates, was an Australian politician. He was an Australian Labor Party member of the House of Representatives from 1914 to 1919 and from 1922 to 1931, representing the electorate of Adelaide.

== Early life ==
Yates was born at Bradley in Staffordshire, England. He came to Australia at the age of seven and was educated at the Flinders Street School in Adelaide. He began working at the age of twelve in Weller's leather grindery in Rundle Street, then six months later began as a japanner at A. M. Simpson & Son, going on to work as a forwarding clerk, commercial traveller and shop assistant for the same firm. In September 1911 he was selected as secretary to the Agricultural Implement Makers' Union and resigned from A. M. Simpson & Son after 27 years. In the same month, he was elected as the first permanent secretary of the United Labor Party, serving until January 1914.

== First stint in parliament and war service ==
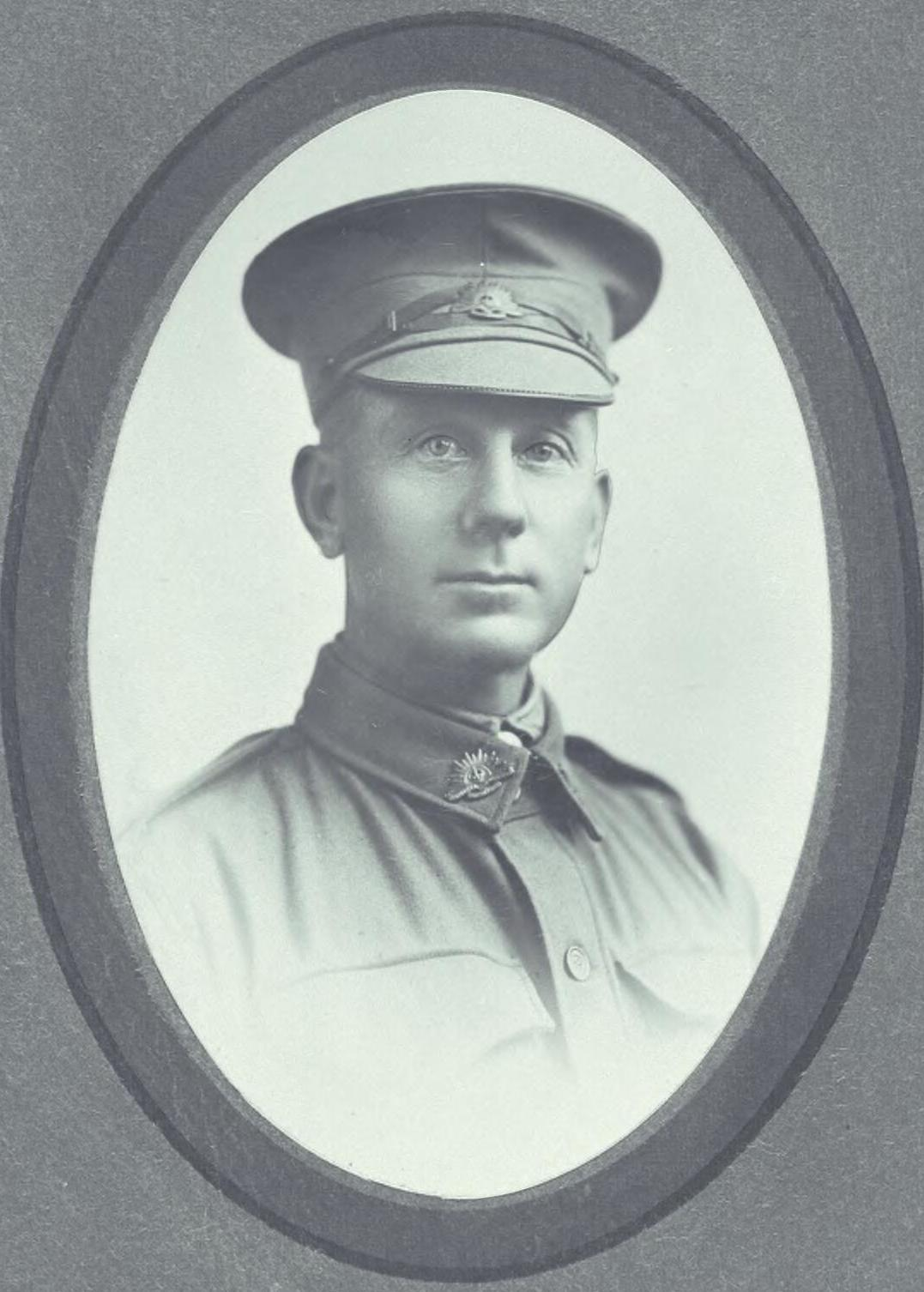
Yates in military uniform, c. 1919

He was elected to the House of Representatives at a 1914 by-election following the death of Labor MP Ernest Roberts. He was an outspoken opponent of conscription during World War I, and in September 1916 voluntarily enlisted in the military while a sitting member of parliament. He was re-elected unopposed at the 1917 election before leaving for war service in November 1918. He served with the 50th Battery of the Australian Field Artillery in France in 1918. He returned from France in February 1919; he would often be referred to as "Gunner Yates" thereafter.

Five days after his return from World War I, he was arrested in Sydney by military police and charged with mutiny over a protest on the troopship Somali while in quarantine off Adelaide on their return. The arrest was the subject of controversy as he had been due to address a large audience at the Adelaide Botanic Gardens upon his return. In March, he would be found guilty of conduct prejudicial to good order and military discipline and having endeavoured to incite members of His Majesty's forces to mutiny and sentenced to 60 days detention. He spent time in Darlinghurst Gaol and Fort Largs, and was made to undertake hard labour at the latter. His father, Edwin, died while he was in custody; he was permitted to attend the funeral. He was released from custody in May. He was narrowly defeated by Nationalist candidate and Labor defector Reginald Blundell at the 1919 federal election.

== Second stint in parliament ==
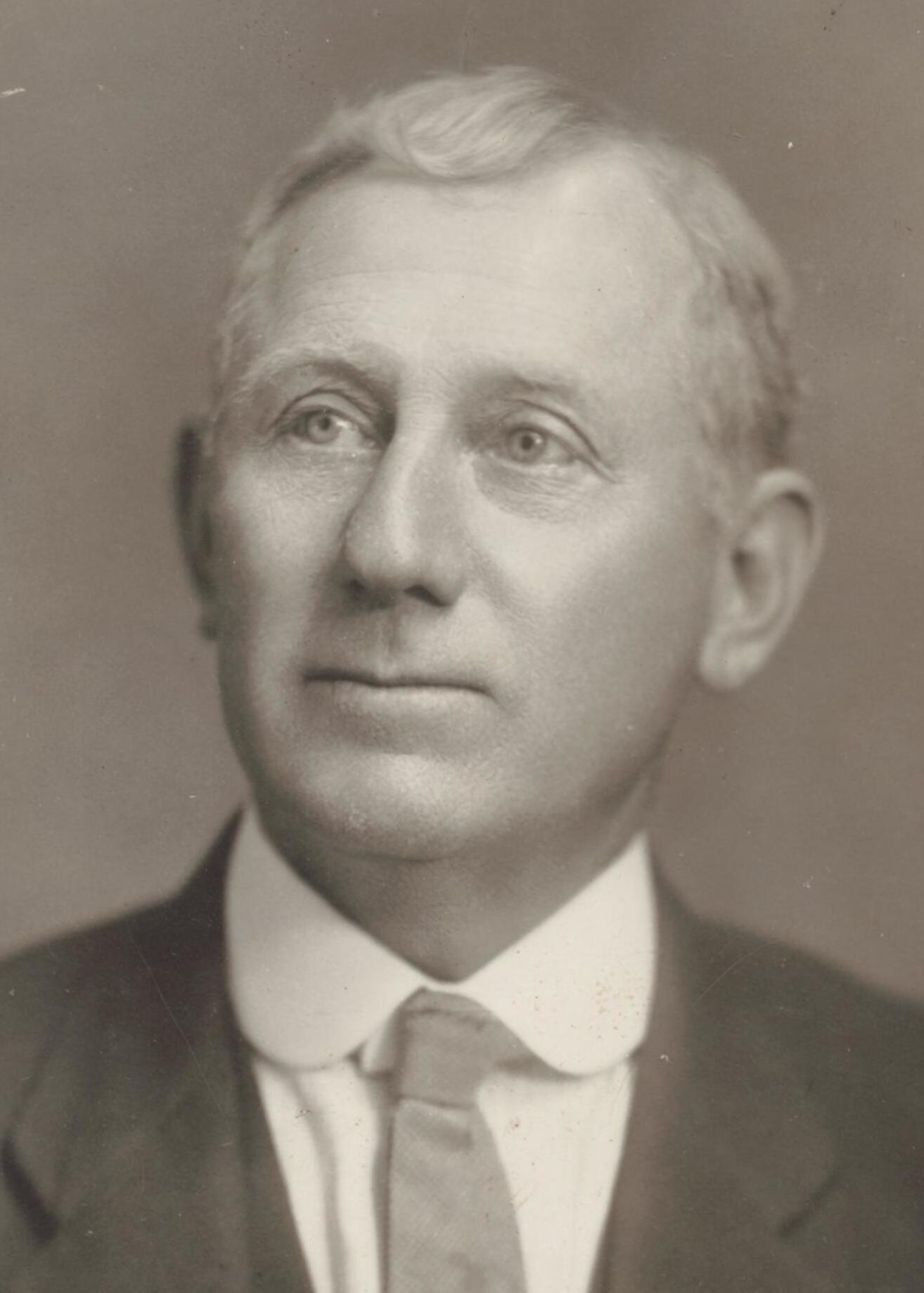
Portrait by Vandyck Studios, Melbourne, c. 1920s

After his 1919 loss, he returned to his former role of state secretary of the Labor Party. He won back his old seat in a three-cornered race against Blundell and a Liberal candidate at the 1922 election. He was re-elected in 1925, 1928 and 1929. Yates advocated the adoption of Song of Australia as the Australian national anthem, and once sang it in parliament in an attempt to prove its appropriateness for the setting. In 1929, he endorsed and campaigned for independent Labor candidate Stanley Whitford for the Legislative Council against endorsed Labor candidate Doug Bardolph after a contentious preselection. He was defeated at the 1931 election by Nationalist candidate Fred Stacey.

== Post-federal politics ==
After his federal defeat, he was selected as one of two official Labor candidates for the South Australian Legislative Council seat of Central No. 1 Province at the 1933 election, held in the fallout of the 1931 Labor split. He was defeated for the second seat by Parliamentary Labor Party incumbent Stanley Whitford amidst some controversy over the system of preferential voting being used at the election. He nominated for preselection in Adelaide at the 1934 federal election, but lost to Ken Bardolph; he initially threatened to contest the seat as an independent in protest at alleged irregularities in the vote, but later withdrew. He unsuccessfully contested Boothby at the 1940 federal election, having stood aside in his old seat of Adelaide for former Labor leader Edgar Dawes.

He resigned from the Labor Party in 1941 in protest at "admitted malpractices", though he stated that his political convictions had not changed. In 1943, he was working as a munitions worker. He was an independent candidate at the 1943 federal election on a platform of alternative funding for the war effort, and for the Central District No. 1 in the Legislative Council at the 1947 state election. In 1949, at the age of 78, he made a final and unsuccessful bid for office as an ungrouped candidate for the Australian Senate at the 1949 federal election, campaigning on a platform focusing on defence issues.

Parliament of Australia
Preceded by Ernest Roberts	Member for Adelaide; 1914–1919	Succeeded by Reginald Blundell
Preceded by Reginald Blundell	Member for Adelaide; 1922–1931	Succeeded by Fred Stacey
