= Mike Pratt (politician) =

Australian politician (born 1948)

Member of the Australian Parliament for Adelaide
- In office 6 February 1988 – 24 March 1990
- Preceded by: Chris Hurford
- Succeeded by: Bob Catley

Personal details
- Born: 10 February 1948 (age 78) Blyth, South Australia
- Party: Liberal
- Occupation: Farmer, marketing executive

Michael Philip Pratt (born 10 February 1948) is an Australian former politician. A member of the Liberal Party, he was elected to the House of Representatives at the 1988 Adelaide by-election. He served until his defeat at the 1990 federal election.

== Early life ==
Pratt was born on 10 February 1948 in Blyth, South Australia. Prior to entering politics he worked as a farmer and from 1984 as a marketing executive with the Norwood Football Club. He joined the Burra branch of the Young Liberals in 1970.

== Parliament ==
Pratt was elected to the House of Representatives at the 1988 Adelaide by-election, which followed the resignation of the incumbent Australian Labor Party (ALP) member Chris Hurford to take up a diplomatic post. In parliament he served on the standing committee on the Parliamentary Library. He was defeated for re-election at the 1990 federal election by the ALP candidate Bob Catley.

== Later activities ==
In 1992, Pratt announced that he would contest the Division of Sturt at the next federal election as an independent. This brought him into conflict with Senator Amanda Vanstone, who alleged that he had never intended to win the seat of Adelaide and was in fact using the by-election as a "dummy run" for the state seat of Norwood.

Pratt later returned to the Liberal Party and supported Vickie Chapman's bid for the state leadership. In 2013, it was reported that he was handing out brochures for independent senator Nick Xenophon. He operated a Liberal Party campaign bus during the 2019 federal election.

His daughter, Penny Pratt was elected as the Liberal member for Frome at the 2022 South Australian state election.

Parliament of Australia
Preceded by Chris Hurford	Member for Adelaide; 1988–1990	Succeeded by Bob Catley
