= Bob Catley (politician) =

Australian politician

Member of the Australian Parliament for Adelaide
- In office 24 March 1990 – 13 March 1993
- Preceded by: Mike Pratt
- Succeeded by: Trish Worth

Personal details
- Born: 1 September 1942 (age 83) Wales
- Party: Australian Labor Party
- Occupation: Lecturer, academic

Robert Catley (born 1 September 1942) is a former Australian Labor politician.

Catley was born in Wales and received a B.Sc.(econ) (Hons) from the London School of Economics and a PhD from the Australian National University. He was subsequently a lecturer and senior lecturer in International Relations at the University of Adelaide, a professor of Political Science at the University of Delaware and the University of Otago and professor of Governance and Head of the School of Business at Charles Darwin University (formerly Northern Territory University). He also worked as a ministerial consultant. He was elected to the House of Representatives seat of Adelaide at the 1990 election, narrowly defeating Liberal incumbent Mike Pratt. A redistribution ahead of the 1993 election pushed his seat to the south, adding Liberal-friendly territory south of the city centre, cutting his margin from an already slender 3.7 percent to an extremely marginal 1.7 percent. It did not help matters that voters were angry at the state Labor government over the collapse of the State Bank of South Australia, These factors led to his defeat by Liberal challenger Trish Worth at the 1993 election.

Professor Catley was Head of the University of Newcastle's Central Coast School of Business at its Ourimbah Campus. He has now retired and spends his days sailing, caravanning, and in the gym.

== Bibliography ==
=== Books ===
- From Tweedledum to Tweedledee: the new Labor government in Australia - a critique of its social model, Australia and New Zealand Book Co., Sydney: 1974.
- Australian Capitalism in Boom and Depression, Alternative Publishing Cooperative, Sydney: 1983.
- Globalising Australian capitalism, Cambridge University Press, Cambridge, UK: 1996.
- The great beast: progress and the modern state, Ashgate, Aldershot, UK: 1997.
- Spratlys: the dispute in the South China Sea, Ashgate, Aldershot, UK: 1997.
- America and Americans in Australia, Praeger, Westport, USA: 1998.
- Australian-Indonesian relations since 1945: the Garuda and the kangaroo, Ashgate, Aldershot, UK: 1998.
- Global America: imposing liberalism on a recalcitrant world, Praeger, Westport, USA: 2000.
- Waltzing with Matilda: should New Zealand join Australia?, Dark Horse Publishing, Wellington, Aotearoa NZ: 2001.
- The strange, recent but understandable triumph of liberalism in Australia, Macleay Press, Sydney: 2005.
- The American challenge: the world resists US liberalism, Ashgate, Aldershot, UK: 2007.

=== Book reviews ===
Year	Review article	Work(s) reviewed
2003	Catley, Bob (July–August 2003). "The battles of economic reform". Quadrant. 47 (7–8 [398]): 116–117.	Pusey, Michael (2003). The experience of middle Australia : the dark side of economic reform. Cambridge UP.

== Notes ==
Parliament of Australia
Preceded by Mike Pratt	Member for Adelaide; 1990–1993	Succeeded by Trish Worth
