= Division of Adelaide =

Australian federal electoral division

Coordinates: 34.907°S 138.602°E

Adelaide Australian House of Representatives Division
- Interactive map of boundaries since the 2019 federal election
- Created: 1903
- MP: Steve Georganas
- Party: Labor
- Namesake: Adelaide
- Electors: 131,466 (2025)
- Area: 86 km^{2} (33.2 sq mi)
- Demographic: Inner metropolitan
Electorates around Adelaide:
Hindmarsh	Makin	Makin
Hindmarsh	Adelaide	Sturt
Boothby	Boothby	Boothby

The Division of Adelaide is an Australian electoral division in South Australia and is named for the city of Adelaide, South Australia's capital.

At the 2016 federal election, the electorate covered 76 km², is centered on the Adelaide city centre and spanning from Grand Junction Road in the north to Cross Road in the south and from Portrush Road in the east to Marion and Holbrooks Road in the west, taking in suburbs including Ashford, Enfield, Goodwood, Kent Town, Keswick, Kilburn, Mansfield Park, Maylands, Northgate, Norwood, Parkside, Prospect, Rose Park, Southwark, St Peters, Toorak Gardens, Torrensville, Thebarton, Unley and Walkerville.

== Geography ==
Since 1984, federal electoral division boundaries in Australia have been determined at redistributions by a redistribution committee appointed by the Australian Electoral Commission. Redistributions occur for the boundaries of divisions in a particular state, and they occur every seven years, or sooner if a state's representation entitlement changes or when divisions of a state are malapportioned.

== History ==
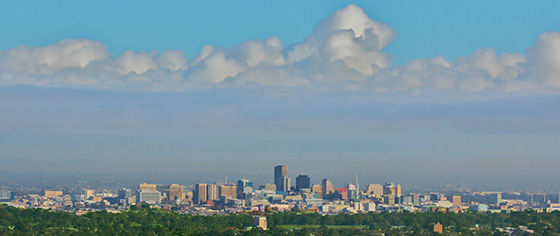
The city of Adelaide, the division's namesake (pictured July 2010)

The division of Adelaide was one of seven single-member seats established when the seven-member statewide Division of South Australia was abolished following the inaugural 1901 election. For the first 40 years after Federation, it was one of the few Federation seats in the state that regularly changed hands between the Australian Labor Party and the conservative parties. Despite the bellwether-like swinging tendency, unusually the only time Adelaide was won by an incoming government was in 1931.

However, Labor held it for all but six years from 1943 to 1993, including a 23-year Labor hold during the Robert Menzies era. For most of the time from 1943 to 1987, it was a fairly safe Labor seat. Labor's hold on the seat loosened slightly in the late 1980s due to pro-Liberal demographic change, and it was briefly lost to the Liberals at a 1988 by-election, but regained in 1990.

As with the modern state electoral district of Adelaide, for most of its first century, the federal Division of Adelaide covered only the Adelaide city centre and a few nearby inner north suburbs up to Regency Road in Prospect.

=== Later years ===
A pre-1993 boundary redistribution pushed the seat to the south, adding Liberal-leaning suburbs to the south of the Adelaide city centre for the first time, while removing Labor suburbs in the north-east. That resulted in Liberal Trish Worth holding the seat for eleven years, albeit on slender margins.

Kate Ellis regained Adelaide for Labor in 2004 on a 1.3 percent margin from a two percent two-party swing. Ellis increased her margin to 8.5 percent in 2007, before falling to 7.7 percent in 2010 and to 4.0 percent in 2013, before increasing to 4.7 percent in 2016.

In 2016, the major party vote was suppressed in all eleven state seats in the presence of Nick Xenophon Team (NXT) candidates in all eleven South Australian seats. Though Labor picked up a two-party swing in all eleven, the NXT presence produced a result where Kingston ended up as the only South Australian seat to record an increase, however small, to the primary vote of a particular major party. Additionally, Adelaide was the only seat of the state's eleven where the Greens vote increased, while also producing both the highest Green vote and the lowest NXT vote in the state. This is in contrast to 2007 where the Xenophon Senate ticket polled higher in Adelaide than in most other seats.

=== 2018 redistribution and next election ===
Labor incumbent Kate Ellis announced in March 2017 that she would step down from the Labor shadow cabinet in the following months and would not re-contest her seat at the end of the parliamentary term. The 2018 South Australian federal redistribution saw the seat of Adelaide lose all of its inner-eastern suburbs and a couple of its southern suburbs, while gaining a long strip of western suburbs spanning the entire north-south length of the seat. These changes saw the Labor margin increase significantly from 4.7 percent to a notional 9.0 percent. In July 2018, Steve Georganas, the Labor member for neighbouring Hindmarsh, sought and won preselection for Adelaide at the 2019 election, yielding his former seat to fellow Labor MP Mark Butler, the member for abolished Port Adelaide.

=== 2025 election landslide ===
At the 2025 election landslide, the Liberals were left seatless in the Adelaide metropolitan area for the first time since the 1946 election. Furthermore, the Liberals won just two of the 400+ metropolitan election-day booths across the seven Adelaide-based seats — Myrtle Bank in the Division of Sturt, and Unley Park in the Division of Adelaide.

== Members ==
Image	Member	Party	Term	Notes
	Charles Kingston (1850–1908)	Protectionist	16 December 1903 – 11 May 1908	Previously held the Division of South Australia. Died in office
	Ernest Roberts (1868–1913)	Labor	13 June 1908 – 2 December 1913	Previously held the South Australian House of Assembly seat of Gladstone. Served as minister under Fisher. Died in office
	George Edwin Yates (1871–1959)	Labor	10 January 1914 – 13 December 1919	Lost seat
	Reginald Blundell (1871–1945)	Nationalist	13 December 1919 – 16 December 1922	Previously held the South Australian House of Assembly seat of Adelaide. Lost seat
	George Edwin Yates (1871–1959)	Labor	16 December 1922 – 19 December 1931	Lost seat
	Fred Stacey (1879–1964)	United Australia	19 December 1931 – 21 August 1943	Lost seat
	Cyril Chambers (1898–1975)	Labor	21 August 1943 – 19 September 1957	Served as minister under Chifley. Retired
	Cyril Chambers (1898–1975)	Independent	19 September 1957 – 16 June 1958	Served as minister under Chifley. Retired
	Cyril Chambers (1898–1975)	Labor	16 June 1958 – 14 October 1958	Served as minister under Chifley. Retired
	Joe Sexton (1905–1974)	Labor	22 November 1958 – 26 November 1966	Lost seat
	Andrew Jones (1944–2015)	Liberal	26 November 1966 – 25 October 1969	Lost seat
	Chris Hurford (1931–2020)	Labor	25 October 1969 – 31 December 1987	Served as minister under Hawke. Resigned to become Australian Consul-General in New York
	Mike Pratt (1948–)	Liberal	6 February 1988 – 24 March 1990	Lost seat
	Bob Catley (1942–)	Labor	24 March 1990 – 13 March 1993	Lost seat
	Trish Worth (1946–)	Liberal	13 March 1993 – 9 October 2004	Lost seat
	Kate Ellis (1977–)	Labor	9 October 2004 – 11 April 2019	Served as minister under Rudd and Gillard. Retired
	Steve Georganas (1959–)	Labor	18 May 2019 – present	Previously held the Division of Hindmarsh. Incumbent

== Election results ==
2025 Australian federal election: Adelaide
Party	Candidate	Votes	%	±%
Labor	Steve Georganas	53,036	46.49	+6.51
Liberal	Amy Grantham	27,571	24.17	−7.83
Greens	Mat Monti	21,642	18.97	−1.13
One Nation	Riley Size	4,584	4.02	+1.03
Trumpet of Patriots	Steve Marks	3,144	2.76	+1.99
Animal Justice	Lionel Pengilley	2,745	2.41	+2.41
Fusion	Matthew McMillan	1,367	1.20	−0.25
Total formal votes		114,089	96.22	+0.01
Informal votes		4,478	3.78	−0.01
Turnout		118,567	90.21	+0.03
Two-party-preferred result
Labor	Steve Georganas	78,796	69.07	+7.16
Liberal	Amy Grantham	35,293	30.93	−7.16
Labor hold		Swing	+7.16	

Alluvial diagram illustrating the full distribution of preferences in the seat of Adelaide for the 2025 Federal Election
