= Trish Worth =

Australian politician

The Honourable Trish Worth AM

Member of the Australian Parliament for Adelaide
- In office 13 March 1993 – 9 October 2004
- Preceded by: Bob Catley
- Succeeded by: Kate Ellis

Personal details
- Born: 21 April 1946 (age 80) Riverton, South Australia
- Party: Liberal Party of Australia
- Spouse: Michael Cobb
- Occupation: Nurse

Patricia Mary Worth AM (born 21 April 1946) is a former Liberal member of the Australian House of Representatives from March 1993 to October 2004, representing the Division of Adelaide, South Australia. She was born in Riverton, South Australia, and was a registered nurse and midwife and a manager in health administration before entering politics.

Worth was Parliamentary Secretary to the Minister for Health and Family Services 1997–98 and Parliamentary Secretary to the Minister for Education, Training and Youth Affairs 1998–2001, and Parliamentary Secretary to the Minister for Health and Aging from November 2001 to October 2004.

Worth was defeated for reelection in 2004 by Labor's Kate Ellis even as the Liberals were easily re-elected to a fourth term in government. After leaving Parliament, Worth became the chairwoman of DrinkWise Australia

In 2016, Worth was awarded as a Member of the Order of Australia (AM).

Parliament of Australia
Preceded by Bob Catley	Member for Adelaide; 1993–2004	Succeeded by Kate Ellis
