= Don Farrell =

Australian politician (born 1954)

Senator the Honourable Don Farrell
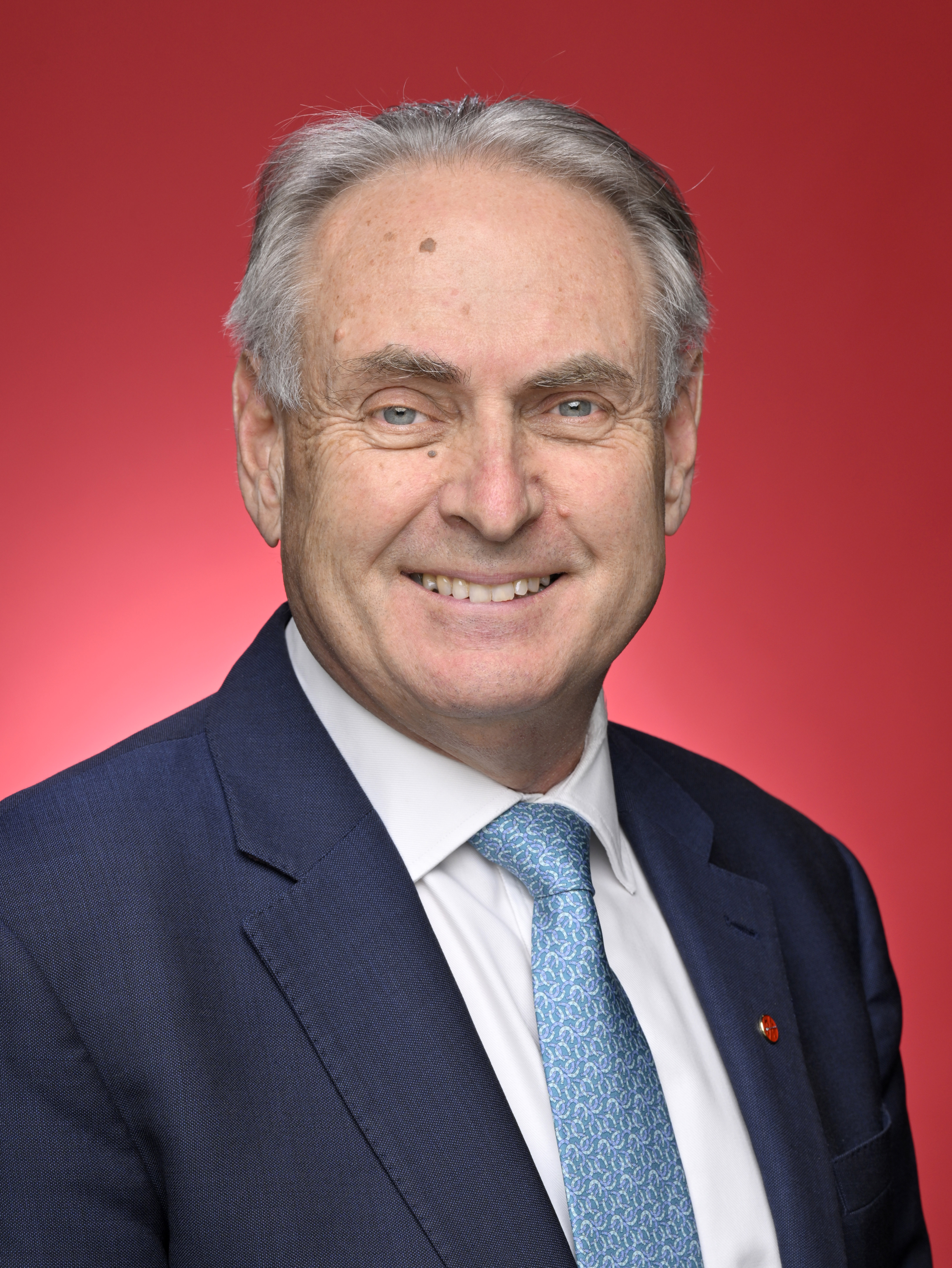
- Official portrait, 2022

Special Minister of State
- Incumbent
- Assumed office 1 June 2022
- Prime Minister: Anthony Albanese
- Preceded by: Ben Morton

Minister for Trade and Tourism
- Incumbent
- Assumed office 1 June 2022
- Prime Minister: Anthony Albanese
- Preceded by: Dan Tehan

Deputy Leader of the Government in the Senate
- Incumbent
- Assumed office 1 June 2022
- Prime Minister: Anthony Albanese
- Leader: Penny Wong
- Preceded by: Michaelia Cash

Deputy Leader of the Opposition in the Senate
- In office 30 September 2016 – 30 May 2019
- Leader: Penny Wong
- Preceded by: Stephen Conroy
- Succeeded by: Kristina Keneally

Minister for Sport
- In office 1 July 2013 – 18 September 2013
- Prime Minister: Kevin Rudd
- Preceded by: Kate Lundy
- Succeeded by: Peter Dutton

Senator for South Australia
- Incumbent
- Assumed office 2 July 2016
- Preceded by: Anne McEwen
- In office 1 July 2008 – 30 June 2014
- Preceded by: Linda Kirk
- Succeeded by: Bob Day

Personal details
- Born: Donald Edward Farrell; 6 June 1954 (age 72) Murray Bridge, South Australia, Australia
- Party: Labor
- Education: University of Adelaide
- Occupation: Union leader
- Website: senatorfarrell.com.au

Donald Edward Farrell (born 6 June 1954) is an Australian politician and former trade unionist. He is a member of the Australian Labor Party (ALP) and has been Minister for Trade and Tourism and Special Minister of State in the Albanese government since 2022. He has served as a Senator for South Australia since 2016, after a previous term from 2008 to 2014.

Farrell holds a law degree from the University of Adelaide. He was state secretary of the Shop, Distributive and Allied Employees Association (SDA) from 1993 to 2008. After an unsuccessful candidacy at the 1988 Adelaide by-election, Farrell was elected to the Senate at the 2007 federal election. He was a parliamentary secretary in the Gillard government from 2010 to 2013, then served briefly as Minister for Science and Research and Minister for Sport prior to the ALP's defeat at the 2013 federal election. He lost his own seat at election, but was returned to the Senate in 2016 following a double dissolution. Farrell was elected as the ALP's deputy Senate leader in 2016 and is a senior figure in the Labor Right faction. He was appointed to cabinet following the party's victory at the 2022 election.

== Early life ==
Farrell was born on 6 June 1954 in Murray Bridge, South Australia. He is the son of Mary Heptinstall and Edward William Farrell. His father was a member of the Democratic Labor Party (DLP) and stood for federal parliament unsuccessfully on six occasions, five times for the seat of Boothby and once for the Senate.

During his childhood, Farrell lived for periods in Crafers, Forestville, Panorama, and Daw Park. He began his schooling at St Therese's School and completed his secondary education at Blackfriars Priory School. He subsequently completed the degree of Bachelor of Laws at the University of Adelaide. He worked for six years in his uncle's kiosk at Cleland Wildlife Park, and also worked as a mail sorter, council worker and waiter for periods.

== Union career ==
Farrell joined the Shop, Distributive and Allied Employees Association (SDA) as an industrial officer in 1976. He was promoted to assistant secretary in 1980 and became state secretary in 1993, serving until his election to the Senate.

== Political career ==
Farrell joined the ALP in 1976 and was elected as a delegate to state conference and state council in the same year. He was a delegate to the Australian Labor Party National Conference from 1984 and was elected state president of the ALP in 1988. He became a senior figure in the Labor Right faction in South Australia.

Farrell first ran for parliament at the 1988 Adelaide by-election but was unsuccessful. In June 2007, Farrell won preselection for the first position on Labor's Senate ticket in the 2007 election and he was subsequently the first elected senator for South Australia at the general election. His term began on 1 July 2008.

=== Gillard and Rudd governments ===
Following the 2010 federal election, he was appointed Parliamentary Secretary for Sustainability and Urban Water. On 25 March 2013, Farrell was promoted into the Outer Ministry as the Minister for Science and Research and the Minister Assisting on Tourism. On 1 July 2013 as part of the Second Rudd Ministry, Farrell was appointed the Minister for Sport as well as remaining Minister Assisting on Tourism.

In 2011 Farrell was listed as number six on the top ten political fixers as identified by The Power Index website. Where the article states that South Australian Labor's former deputy leader, Ralph Clarke commented:

"He controls the pre-selection directly or indirectly of every MP in South Australia. If you want to get on, you get on with Don."

In 2012, he was again selected as the first candidate on Labor's Senate ticket in the 2013 federal election, causing some controversy as he defeated Penny Wong for the leading Senate position. At the time, Wong was a senior minister in the Second Gillard Ministry and a member of the Australian Cabinet. Anthony Albanese accused union powerbrokers of not listening to the electorate and instead focusing on its own ructions. He labelled the move as:

"...gross self-indulgent rubbish.... [taken by] ....those who should care more about the party and less about themselves."

He stated that he would demand that Labor's national executive overturn the decision and promote Senator Wong to the number one spot. On 30 October 2012, Farrell stepped aside to give Wong the number one spot on Labor's senate ticket for the 2013 election. He was quoted as saying:

"I was concerned that the issue was damaging the Labor Party. ..... I was prepared to do a swap with Penny. This is a case whereby modern Labor can't be seen to be concentrating on our internals at the expense of what is going on out there in the electorate and what is expected."

Wong later expressed favourable sentiments about Farrell after his decision to stand aside:

"Throughout his career, Don has always put the Labor Party first and he has demonstrated that principle again today."

=== Time in opposition ===
Farrell was defeated at the 2013 federal election and his term in the Senate ended on 30 June 2014.

In January 2014, it was announced that Michael O'Brien offered Farrell his state seat of Napier, so that Farrell could contest the 2014 South Australian election, representing Labor. Premier Jay Weatherill threatened to resign if Farrell was successfully preselected. A few hours later, Farrell withdrew his nomination.

In 2016 Farrell was endorsed as a Labor candidate for the Senate in South Australia in the 2016 federal election, and was subsequently re-elected. He was elected and returned to the Labor frontbench in October 2016.

Farrell opposed same-sex marriage and supported the view of "traditional marriage as being between a man and a woman". He said he would only vote for marriage equality after the 2019 election. He had publicly stated that he would vote against marriage equality in the parliament regardless of the results of the Australian Marriage Law Postal Survey. When the Marriage Amendment (Definition and Religious Freedoms) Act 2017 bill was voted in the senate, Farrell abstained from voting.

=== Ministry in Albanese Government ===
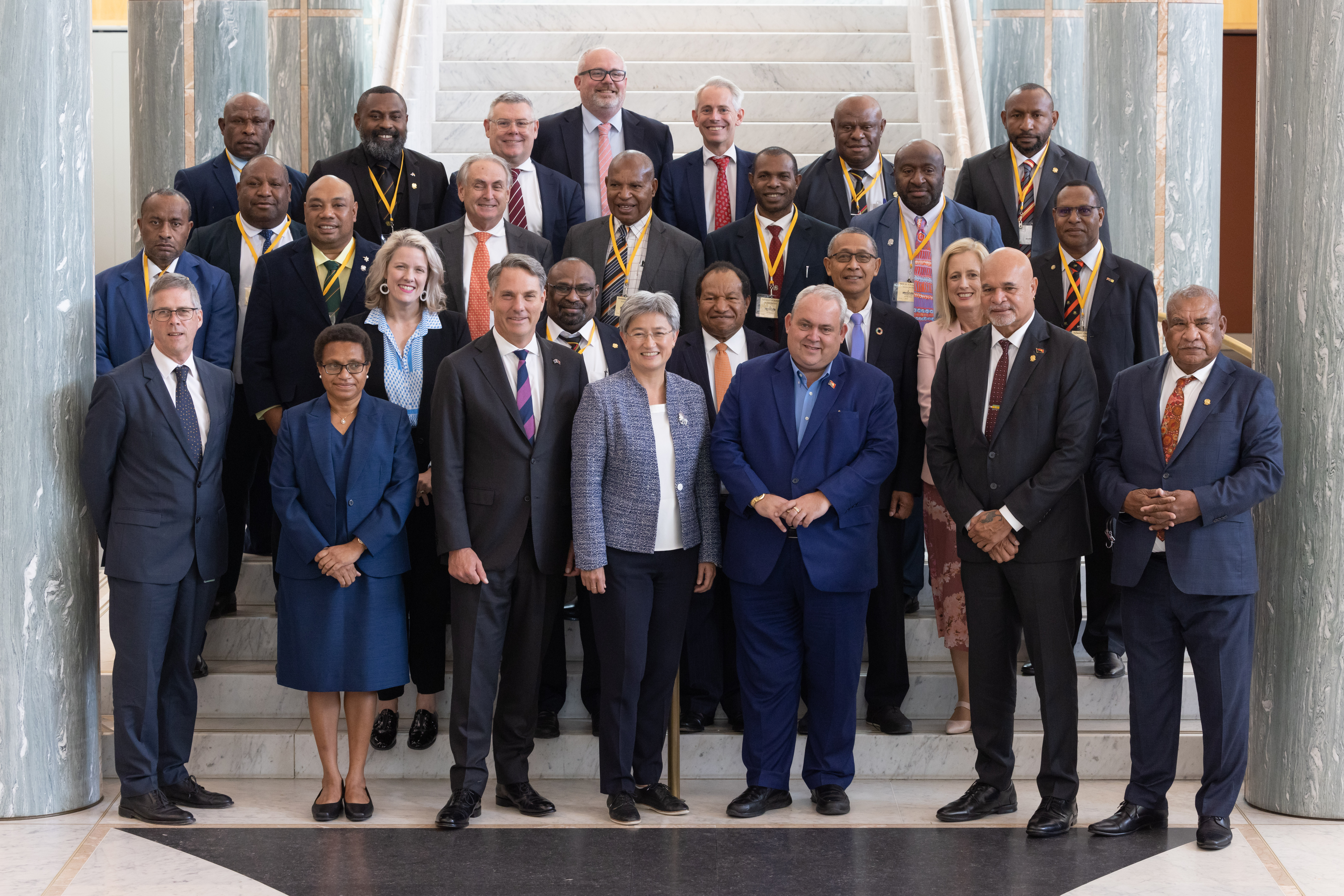
Farrell in Parliament after a meeting of the Australia & Papua New Guinea Ministerial Forum, February 2023

After the ALP's victory at the 2022 federal election, Farrell became the deputy leader of the government in the Senate. He was appointed to cabinet in the Albanese ministry, becoming Special Minister of State and Minister for Trade and Tourism. In the role, Farrell has kept pressure on his China counterparts to lift their trade sanctions against Australian exports, saying, "Things aren’t going to get back to normal until they lift those bans."

These efforts appear to have paid off in April 2024, when China lifted its punitive tariffs on Australian wine. However, Farrell maintained his goal of diversifying trade risk away from China, beginning new free trade agreements with the UK and India. On New Year's Day 2022, Farrell's free trade agreement with India became active, with tariffs being removed on 85% of Australia's exports to India. In March 2026, he completed his goal of securing a free trade agreement with the European Union after almost eight years of negotiations.

== Personal life ==
In 2014, following the end of his first Senate term, Farrell established Farrell Wines, a vineyard in the Clare Valley.

Farrell is married to Nimfa and has 3 grown daughters.

Farrell's daughter, Emily, is married to Lawrence Ben, who was elected to the South Australian House of Assembly for the seat of Enfield in 2026.

Political offices
Preceded by Kate Lundy	Minister for Sport; 2013	Succeeded by Peter Dutton
Preceded by Ben Morton	Special Minister of State; 2022–present	Incumbent
Preceded by Dan Tehan	Minister for Trade and Tourism; 2022–present	Incumbent
Preceded by Michaelia Cash	Deputy Leader of the Government in the Senate; 2022–present	Incumbent
