= Chris Hurford =

Australian politician (1931–2020)

The Honourable Chris Hurford AO
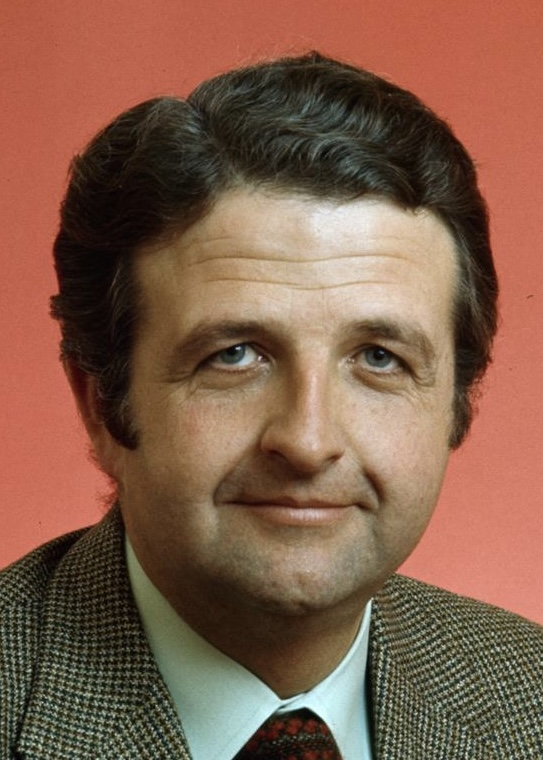

Minister for Community Services
- In office 16 February 1987 – 24 July 1987
- Preceded by: Don Grimes
- Succeeded by: Neal Blewett

Minister for Immigration and Ethnic Affairs
- In office 13 December 1984 – 16 February 1987
- Preceded by: Stewart West
- Succeeded by: Mick Young

Minister for Housing & Construction
- In office 11 March 1983 – 13 December 1984
- Preceded by: Tom McVeigh
- Succeeded by: Stewart West

Manager of Opposition Business
- In office 11 February 1980 – 7 November 1980
- Leader: Bill Hayden
- Preceded by: Mick Young
- Succeeded by: Lionel Bowen

Member of the Australian Parliament for Adelaide
- In office 25 October 1969 – 31 December 1987
- Preceded by: Andrew Jones
- Succeeded by: Mike Pratt

Personal details
- Born: Christopher John Hurford-Jones; 30 July 1931 Mhow, Indore Residency, British India
- Died: 15 November 2020 (aged 89) Adelaide, South Australia
- Party: Labor
- Occupation: Accountant

Christopher John Hurford AO (30 July 1931 – 15 November 2020) was a Labor member of the Australian House of Representatives seat of Adelaide from 1969 to 1987. He played a key role in the development of Australia's skills-oriented immigration policy, and founded the ALP Labor Unity faction in SA.

== Early life ==
Hurford was born in Mhow, India, to an English father and Australian mother. In 1940, his mother took the children to Perth, Western Australia where Hurford attended school, before returning to India, then to England. In 1949, his whole family migrated to Western Australia as 'ten-pound poms', despite their Australian heritage. After studying at the London School of Economics, Hurford worked in accountancy before entering federal parliament in 1969, representing the Division of Adelaide, South Australia. The seat had fallen to Liberal Andrew Jones during the massive Coalition landslide of 1966. However, Jones' strong conservatism did not resonate well in this traditionally Labor seat, and Hurford retook the seat for Labor on a resounding 14.3 percent swing, turning it into a safe Labor seat in one election cycle, securing a majority of the first preferences. He held Adelaide until his resignation in 1987.

== Ministerial record ==
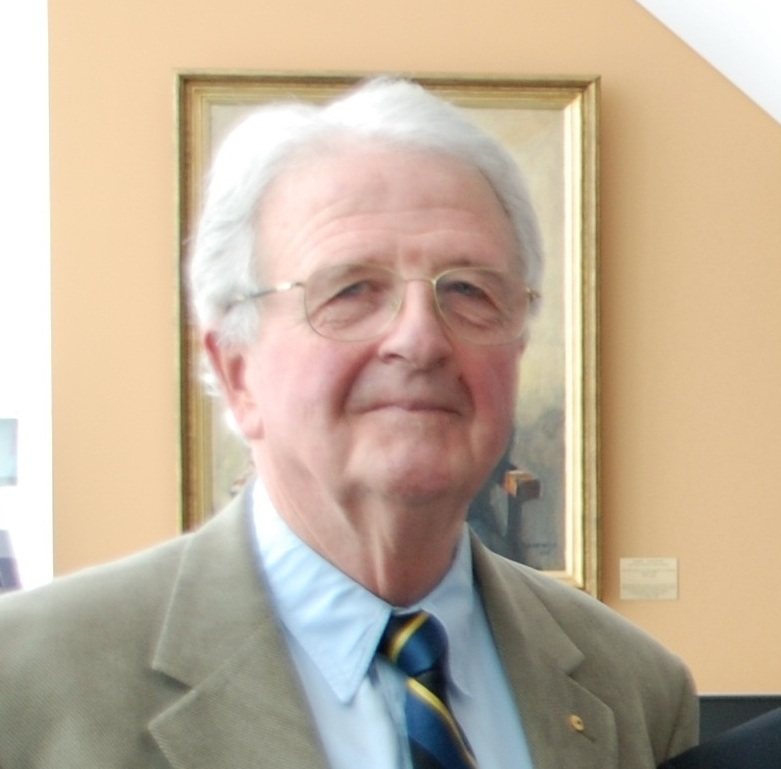
Opening of the Chris Hurford exhibition at the Bob Hawke Prime Ministerial Library in 2011.

Hurford was Minister for Housing and Construction, outside Cabinet in the first Hawke Ministry from March 1983 to December 1984. In the second Hawke Ministry, he was promoted to Cabinet as Minister for Immigration and Ethnic Affairs until February 1987, when he replaced Don Grimes as Minister for Community Services.

As Immigration Minister, Hurford led a change in Australia's immigration policy that has endured into the 2020s. He introduced a system that combined a higher level of immigration with a higher proportion of skilled migrants, as judged by a points-based system that assessed their skills, qualifications and experience. He argued that such a system would benefit Australia economically by improving the country's level of human capital, and reducing the demographic ageing of the population. The system won international approval and is now often referred to as the "Australian points-based system". While introducing a formal category of skilled migration, the system under Hurford retained both a humanitarian and a family reunion intake.

Hurford also made an early, unsuccessful attempt to reduce ministerial discretions in the granting of immigration visas.

Hurford's period as Immigration Minister was also notable for his unsuccessful attempt to have Sheikh Taj El-Din Hilaly deported.

In July 1987, Hurford withdrew from the third Hawke ministry for personal reasons and resigned from Parliament at the end of the year.

The resulting by-election in his seat of Adelaide saw his party lose the seat, with voters expressing anger at the by-election, having believed that Hurford would serve them as their member of parliament for the full term.

== Internal ALP role ==
Within the South Australian ALP, Hurford is arguably an important modernising figure. He led the creation of the Labor Unity faction, a group variously described as "right-wing", moderate or (after the ascension of the UK Blair Government) "Third Way". As a Catholic, Hurford won support from the socially conservative leadership of the Shop Distributive and Allied Trades Union in forming the faction.

In the 1980s, Hurford led the SA Labor Unity group in vigorously defending within the ALP the policy direction of the Hawke Government, a direction with which the larger Centre-Left and Left factions were uncomfortable. By the 1990s, Labor Unity had become a substantial counterweight to the other factions in SA.

== Post political life ==
On resignation from Parliament at the end of 1987, Hurford became Australia's Consul-General in New York for four years. In 1991, he was appointed head of external relations at the University of South Australia.

== Notes ==
Political offices
| Preceded by Ralph Hunt | Minister for Housing and Construction; 1983–1984 | Succeeded by Stewart West |
| Preceded by Stewart West | Minister for Immigration and Ethnic Affairs; 1984–1987 | Succeeded by Mick Young |
| Preceded by Don Grimes | Minister for Community Services; 1987 | Succeeded by Neal Blewett |
Parliament of Australia
| Preceded by Andrew Jones | Member for Adelaide; 1969–1988 | Succeeded by Mike Pratt |
Diplomatic posts
| Preceded by John Taylor | Australian Consul General in New York; 1988–1992 | Succeeded by Peter Curtis |
