= Frontbench of Adam Bandt =

Frontbench of the Australian Greens of Adam Bandt
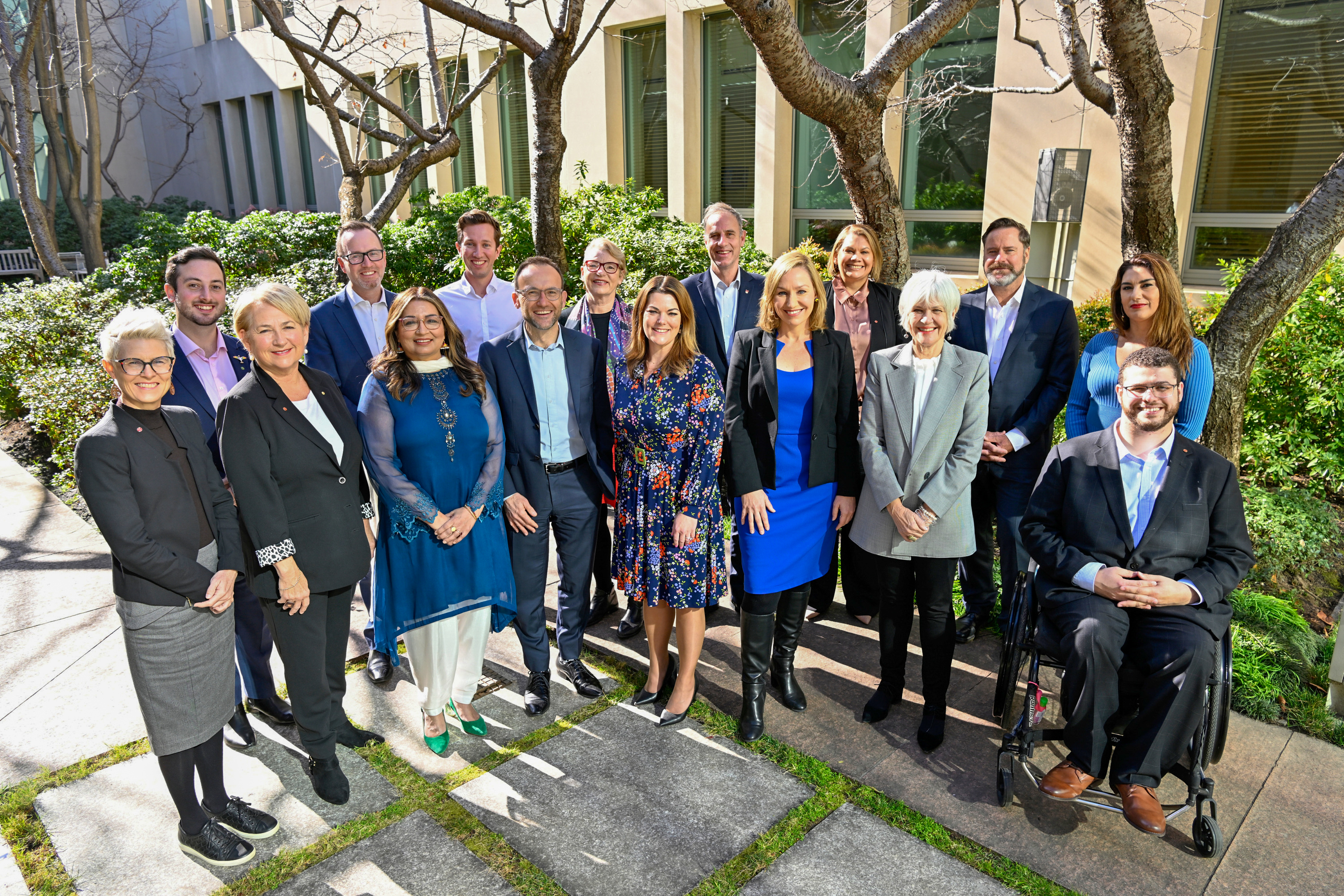
- Senators and MPs following the 2022 federal election
- Date formed: 2 February 2022
- Date dissolved: 8 May 2025

People and organisations
- Leader: Adam Bandt
- Leader's history: Member for Melbourne (2010–25); Deputy leader (2012–15; 2017–20)
- Deputy leader: Larissa Waters (2015–2022); Nick McKim (2020–2022); Mehreen Faruqi (2022–2026)
- No. of ministers: 10 (2020–2022); 16 (2022–2025)
- Member party: Australian Greens
- Status in legislature: Crossbench 10 / 226 (4%) (2020–2022) 16 / 226 (7%) (2022–2025)

History
- Elections: 2020 (leadership); 2022 (parliamentary); 2022 (leadership); 2025 (parliamentary)
- Predecessor: Frontbench of Richard Di Natale
- Successor: Frontbench of Larissa Waters

The Australian Greens frontbench consists of all Greens members of Parliament serving as the party's spokespeople inside Parliament on various issues, each member being assigned shadow portfolios for their speaking duties. This allows the Greens to shadow government policies and actions from the party perspective.

The frontbench led by Adam Bandt follows on from the frontbench of Richard Di Natale, former Greens leader. Some of the major changes in this arrangement included the Foreign Affairs portfolio being reallocated from Di Natale to Bandt, while new portfolios were created for Larissa Waters and Mehreen Faruqi to represent the leader on various issues in the Senate. The NBN was added to the digital rights and IT portfolio held by Nick McKim, and portfolios formerly held by Bandt were assigned to Janet Rice. Tourism and Gambling were reallocated from Waters to Sarah Hanson-Young and Rachel Siewert, respectively. A new portfolio of Dental Health was also added to Hanson-Young's responsibilities, which the Senator welcomed, stating she could not "wait to sink her teeth into it".

After the resignation of Rachel Siewert, and preparing for the 2022 federal election, a reshuffle of portfolios was announced. Some changes in this arrangement included Nick McKim becoming the Party Whip, the Health portfolio being combined with the Dental Health and Mental Health portfolios and allocated to Jordon Steele-John, and the Family, Ageing and Community Services and Gambling portfolios previously held by Siewert being allocated to Janet Rice and Sarah Hanson-Young, respectively. The Public Sector portfolio was reallocated from Adam Bandt to Larissa Waters, with the Mining and Resources portfolio reassigned from Waters to Dorinda Cox. Also allocated to Cox was the Trade portfolio from Steele-John, and the Science, Research and Innovation portfolio from Rice. Bandt stated that this reshuffle "will give the Greens the best chance of kicking the government out".

== Composition ==
=== Fifth arrangement ===
A new arrangement was put in place following the resignation of Janet Rice and the appointment of Steph Hodgins-May.

Role	Spokesperson
Leader of the Greens; Workplace Relations; Climate Change and Energy	Adam Bandt MP
Deputy Leader of the Greens; Education - Tertiary; Anti-Racism; Animal Welfare; International Aid and Global Justice; Republic; Climate Adaptation & Resilience	Senator Mehreen Faruqi
Leader of the Greens in the Senate; Women; Democracy	Senator Larissa Waters
Manager of Business in the Senate; Environment and Water; Arts and Communications	Senator Sarah Hanson-Young
Senate Whip; Economic Justice and Treasury; Emergency Management; Forests	Senator Nick McKim
Education - Primary and Secondary; Transition and Regional Development; Social Services; Government Services; Older People; Sport	Senator Penny Allman-Payne
Healthy Oceans; Waste and Recycling; Agriculture	Senator Peter Whish-Wilson
Health; Disability Rights and Services; Foreign Affairs; Peace and Nuclear Disarmament	Senator Jordon Steele-John
First Nations; Trade and Tourism; Resources; Northern Australia	Senator Dorinda Cox
Digital Rights and IT; Justice; Attorney-General's Department; Drug law reform; Defence and Veterans' Affairs; Home Affairs, Immigration, Citizenship and Multicultural Affairs	Senator David Shoebridge
Transport; Sustainable Cities; Infrastructure	Elizabeth Watson-Brown MP
Employment; Public Sector; Finance	Senator Barbara Pocock
Housing; Homelessness	Max Chandler-Mather MP
LGBTIQA+; Youth	Stephen Bates MP
Early Childhood; Science, Industry and Innovation	Senator Steph Hodgins-May

=== Fourth arrangement ===
A new arrangement was announced following the 2022 election.

Role	Spokesperson
Leader of the Greens; Climate Change and Energy; Workplace Relations	Adam Bandt MP
Deputy Leader of the Greens; Education; Early Childhood; Vocational and Higher Education; Anti-Racism; International Aid and Global Justice; Animal Welfare	Senator Mehreen Faruqi
Leader of the Greens in the Senate; Women; Democracy; Electoral reform; Parliamentary standards	Senator Larissa Waters
Manager of Business in the Senate; Environment and Water; Arts and Communications	Senator Sarah Hanson-Young
Senate Whip; Economic Justice and Treasury; Home Affairs, Immigration, Citizenship and Multicultural Affairs	Senator Nick McKim
Party Room Chair; Social Services; Aged Care; Government Services; Forests	Senator Janet Rice
Agriculture; Healthy Oceans; Waste	Senator Peter Whish-Wilson
Health; Foreign Affairs, Peace and Nuclear Disarmament; Disability Rights and Services	Senator Jordon Steele-John
Resources; Science; Trade and Tourism; First Nations (from February 2023)	Senator Dorinda Cox
Justice; Attorney-General's Department; Drug law reform; Defence and Veterans' Affairs; Digital Rights	Senator David Shoebridge
Infrastructure; Transport; Sustainable Cities	Elizabeth Watson-Brown MP
Finance; Employment; Public Sector	Senator Barbara Pocock
Housing; Homelessness	Max Chandler-Mather MP
Industry, Transition and Regional Development; Northern Australia; Schools	Senator Penny Allman-Payne
LGBTIQA+; Youth	Stephen Bates MP
Former spokespeople
Deputy Leader in the Senate (June to October 2022); First Nations (June 2022 to February 2023); The Republic (June 2022 to February 2023); Sport (June 2022 to February 2023)	Senator Lidia Thorpe

=== Third arrangement ===
Senators and MPs prior to the 2022 Australian federal election.

The frontbench was rearranged following the resignation of Rachel Siewert and the appointment of Dorinda Cox.

Role	Spokesperson
Leader of the Australian Greens; Spokesperson for the Climate Emergency; Spokesperson for Energy; Spokesperson for Employment and Workplace Relations	Adam Bandt MP
Leader in the Senate; Co-Deputy Leader of the Australian Greens; Spokesperson for Women; Spokesperson for Democracy (covers Local Government); Spokesperson for the Public Sector	Senator Larissa Waters
Party Whip; Co-Deputy Leader of the Australian Greens; Spokesperson for Digital Rights, I.T. and NBN; Spokesperson for Economic Justice; Spokesperson for Immigration and Citizenship; Spokesperson for Treasury & Finance	Senator Nick McKim
Spokesperson for Mining and Resources; Spokesperson for Trade; Spokesperson for Science, Research and Innovation	Senator Dorinda Cox
Party Room Chair; Spokesperson for LGBTIQ+ Rights; Spokesperson for Multiculturalism; Spokesperson for Forests; Spokesperson for Foreign Affairs; Spokesperson for Family, Ageing and Community Services	Senator Janet Rice
Spokesperson for Sport; Spokesperson for Justice; Spokesperson for First Nations Peoples	Senator Lidia Thorpe
Spokesperson for Housing; Spokesperson for Education; Spokesperson for Animal Welfare; Spokesperson for Industry; Spokesperson for International Aid and Development; Spokesperson for Anti-Racism	Senator Mehreen Faruqi
Spokesperson for Disability Rights and Services; Spokesperson for Youth; Spokesperson for Nuclear; Spokesperson for Peace and Disarmament (covers Defence); Spokesperson for Veterans' Affairs; Spokesperson for Health (including Dental and Mental Health)	Senator Jordon Steele-John
Spokesperson for Arts, Media and Communications; Spokesperson for Environment and Water; Spokesperson for Tourism; Spokesperson for Gambling; Spokesperson for Transport and Infrastructure	Senator Sarah Hanson-Young
Spokesperson for Agriculture and Rural Affairs; Spokesperson for Healthy Oceans; Spokesperson for Waste and Recycling; Spokesperson for Consumer Affairs; Spokesperson for Small Business	Senator Peter Whish-Wilson

=== Second arrangement ===
The frontbench was rearranged following the resignation of Richard Di Natale and the appointment of Lidia Thorpe.

Role	Spokesperson
Leader of the Australian Greens; Spokesperson for the Climate Emergency; Spokesperson for Energy; Spokesperson for Employment and Workplace Relations; Spokesperson for the Public Sector	Adam Bandt MP
Leader in the Senate; Co-Deputy Leader of the Australian Greens; Spokesperson for Women; Spokesperson for Mining and Resources; Spokesperson for Democracy; Spokesperson for Local Government	Senator Larissa Waters
Co-Deputy Leader of the Australian Greens; Spokesperson for Digital Rights, I.T. and NBN; Spokesperson for Economic Justice; Spokesperson for Immigration and Citizenship; Spokesperson for Treasury & Finance	Senator Nick McKim
Party Whip; Spokesperson for Health; Spokesperson for Family, Ageing and Community Services; Spokesperson for Mental Health; Spokesperson for Gambling	Senator Rachel Siewert
Party Room Chair; Spokesperson for LGBTIQ+ Rights; Spokesperson for Multiculturalism; Spokesperson for Science, Research and Innovation; Spokesperson for Transport and Infrastructure; Spokesperson for Forests; Spokesperson for Foreign Affairs	Senator Janet Rice
Spokesperson for Sport; Spokesperson for Justice; Spokesperson for First Nations Peoples	Senator Lidia Thorpe
Spokesperson for Housing; Spokesperson for Education; Spokesperson for Animal Welfare; Spokesperson for Industry; Spokesperson for International Aid and Development; Spokesperson for Animal Welfare; Spokesperson for Anti-Racism	Senator Mehreen Faruqi
Spokesperson for Disability Rights and Services; Spokesperson for Youth; Spokesperson for Trade; Spokesperson for Nuclear; Spokesperson for Peace and Disarmament (covers Defence); Spokesperson for Veterans' Affairs	Senator Jordon Steele-John
Spokesperson for Dental Health; Spokesperson for Arts, Media and Communications; Spokesperson for Environment and Water; Spokesperson for Tourism	Senator Sarah Hanson-Young
Spokesperson for Agriculture and Rural Affairs; Spokesperson for Healthy Oceans; Spokesperson for Waste and Recycling; Spokesperson for Consumer Affairs; Spokesperson for Small Business	Senator Peter Whish-Wilson

=== First arrangement ===
The frontbench was rearranged following the election of Adam Bandt as party leader.

Spokesperson	Portfolio
Adam Bandt (Leader)	Climate Emergency; Energy; Employment and Workplace Relations; Public Sector; Foreign Affairs
Larissa Waters (Leader in the Senate and Co-Deputy Leader)	Women; Mining and Resources; Democracy; Representing Leader on Climate Change and Energy in Senate; Representing Leader on Foreign Affairs in Senate
Nick McKim (Co-Deputy Leader)	Digital Rights, I.T. and NBN; Justice; Immigration and Citizenship
Rachel Siewert (Party Whip)	First Nations Peoples' Issues; Family, Ageing and Community Services; Mental Health; Gambling
Janet Rice (Party Room Chair)	LGBTIQ Issues; Sport; Agriculture and Rural Affairs; Forests; Sustainable Cities; Transport and Infrastructure; Science, Research and Innovation
Richard Di Natale	Health; Multiculturalism
Mehreen Faruqi	Housing; Education; Animal Welfare; Industry; International Aid and Development; Local Government; Representing Leader on Employment, Workplace Relations and Public Sector in the Senate
Jordon Steele-John	Disability Rights and Services; Youth; Trade; Peace and Nuclear Disarmament (covers Defence); Veterans' Affairs
Sarah Hanson-Young	Dental Health; Arts, Media and Communications; Environment and Water; Tourism
Peter Whish-Wilson	Treasury and Finance; Healthy Oceans; Waste and Recycling; Consumer Affairs; Small Business
