= Frontbench of the Australian Greens =

Frontbench of the Australian Greens of David Shoebridge
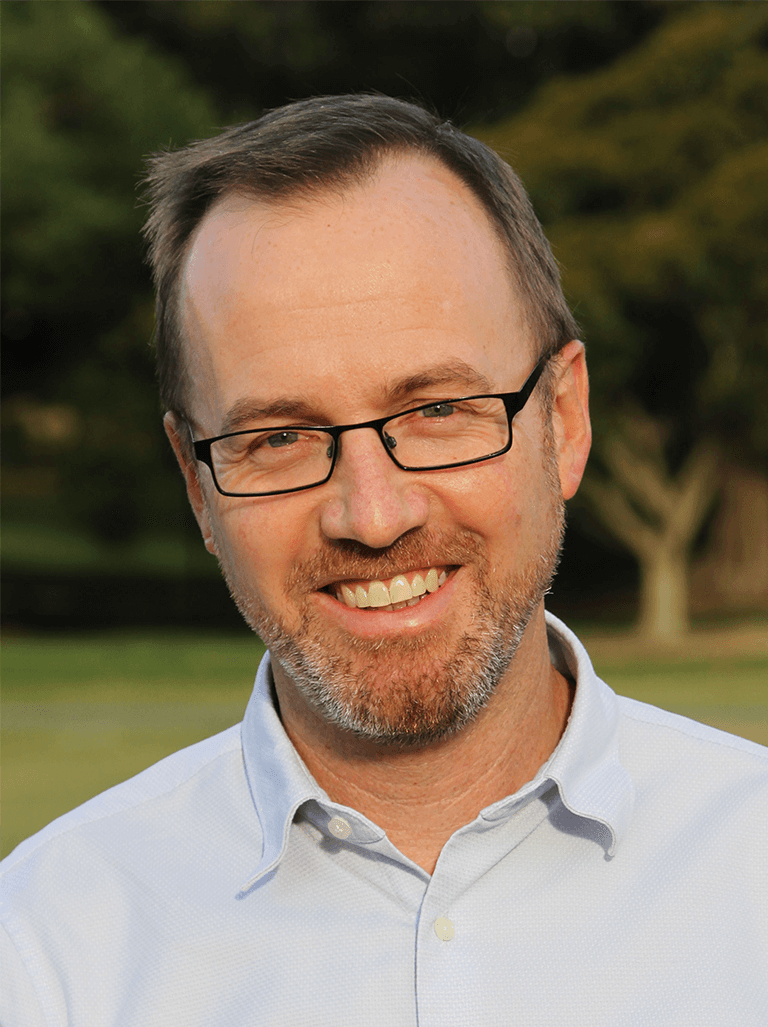
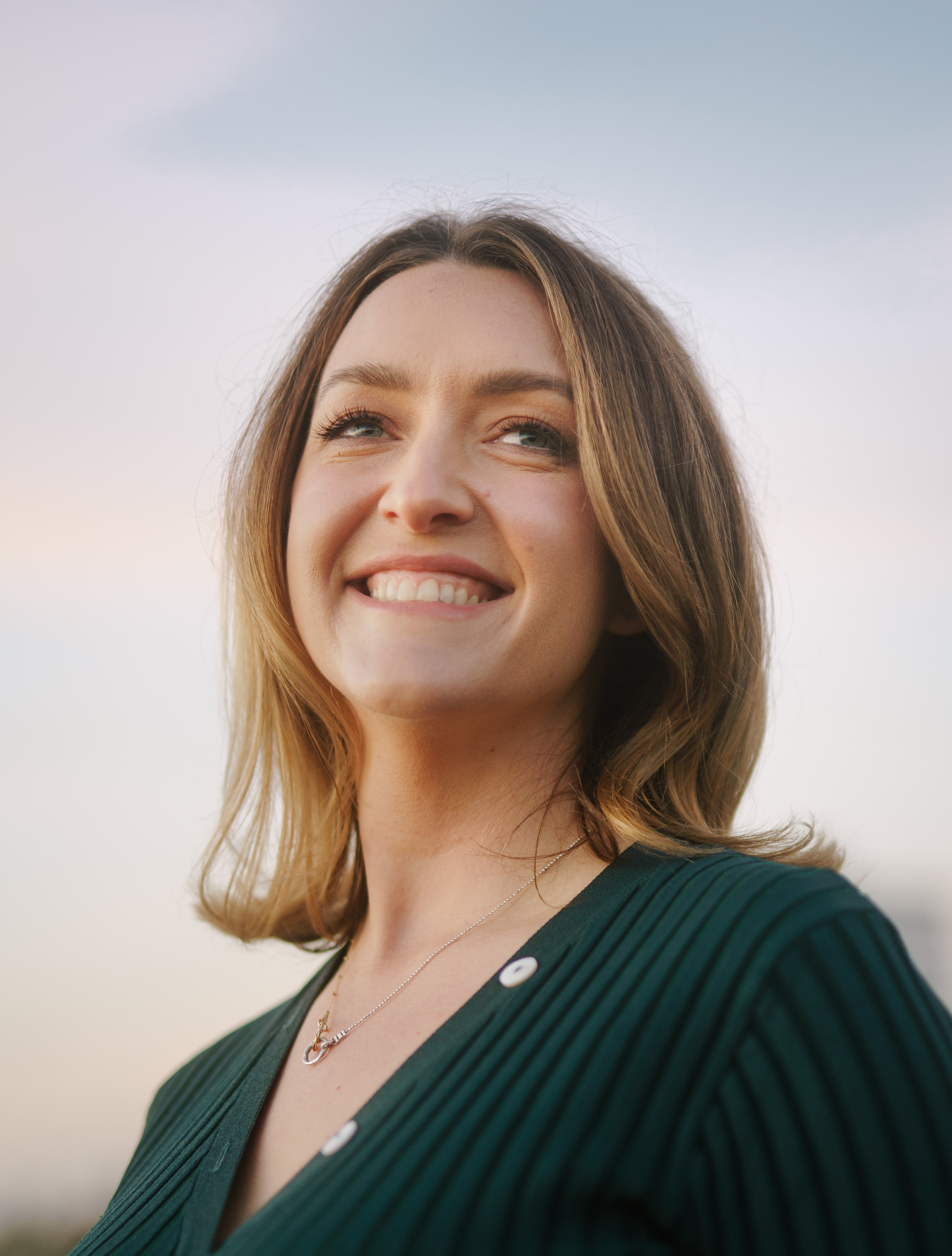
- David Shoebridge (Leader) Steph Hodgins-May (Deputy Leader)
- Date formed: 30 September 2026

People and organisations
- Leader: David Shoebridge
- Leader's history: Senator for New South Wales
- Deputy Leader: Steph Hodgins-May
- No. of ministers: 11
- Member party: Australian Greens
- Status in legislature: Crossbench 11 / 226 (5%)

History
- Election: 2025

The Australian Greens frontbench consists of all Greens members of Parliament serving as the party's spokespeople inside Parliament on various issues, each member being assigned shadow portfolios for their speaking duties. This allows the Greens to shadow government policies and actions from the party perspective.

== Previous arrangement by Larissa Waters (2025–2026) ==
A new Greens frontbench was formed following the departure of Adam Bandt and the 2025 Australian Greens leadership election that elected Larissa Waters as Leader and the rest of the leadership team. Other portfolios and the spokespeople responsible for them were announced later.

Spokesperson	Role
Senator Larissa Waters	Leader of The Greens; Climate Change & Energy; Women; First Nations
Senator Mehreen Faruqi	Deputy Leader of The Greens; Education - Tertiary; Anti-racism; Climate Adaptation, Resilience & Emergency Management; International Aid & Global Justice; Animal Welfare; Republic
Senator Sarah Hanson-Young	Manager of Business in the Senate; Environment & Water; Arts & Communications
Senator Nick McKim	Party Whip; Economic Justice & Treasury; Forests; LGBTQIA+
Senator Penny Allman-Payne	Party Room Chair; Deputy Whip; Social Services; Education - Primary & Secondary; Older People; Transition, Regional Development & Northern Australia; Sport
Senator Vanessa Bleyer	Agriculture; Science, Industry & Innovation; Trade & Tourism; Healthy Oceans; Waste & Recycling
Senator Jordon Steele-John	Health & Mental Health; Disability Inclusion and the National Disabiliity Insurance Scheme; Youth
Elizabeth Watson-Brown MP	Transport, Infrastructure & Sustainable Cities; Assistant for Veterans Affairs
Senator Barbara Pocock	Housing and Homelessness; Finance; Workplace Relations, Jobs & Employment; Public Sector
Senator David Shoebridge	Foreign Affairs, Peace & Nuclear Disarmament; Defence & Veterans Affairs; Justice; Home Affairs, Immigration, Citizenship & Multicultural Affairs; Digital Rights & IT
Senator Steph Hodgins-May	Early Childhood Education; Democracy; Resources; Assistant for Climate Change & Energy; Transport, Infrastructure & Sustainable Cities in the Senate

== Previous arrangements led by other leaders ==
- Frontbench of Bob Brown
- Frontbench of Christine Milne
- Frontbench of Richard Di Natale
- Frontbench of Adam Bandt

== See also ==
- Frontbench of the Greens New South Wales
- Frontbench of the ACT Greens
