= History of the Australian Greens =

History of political parties

The history of the Australian Greens has its origins in the green parties founded in the 1980s in each of the states of Australia.

== Formation ==
The formation of the Australian Greens in 1992 brought together over a dozen green groups, from state and local organisations, some of which had existed for 20 years.

The precursor to the Tasmanian Greens (the earliest existent member of the federation of parties that is the Australian Greens), the United Tasmania Group, was founded in 1972 to oppose the construction of new dams to flood Lake Pedder. The campaign failed to prevent the flooding of Lake Pedder and the party failed to gain political representation. One of the party's candidates was Bob Brown, then a doctor in Launceston.

In the late 1970s and 1980s, a public campaign to prevent the construction of the Franklin Dam in Tasmania saw environmentalist and activist Norm Sanders elected to the Tasmanian House of Assembly as an Australian Democrat. Brown, then director of the Wilderness Society, contested the election as an independent, but failed to win a seat.

In 1982 Norm Sanders resigned from the THA, and Brown was elected to replace him in a countback, which involves re-counting the ballots from the election that elected the incumbent to elect one of the candidates who stood but failed to be elected in the same election.

During her 1984 visit to Australia, West German Greens parliamentarian Petra Kelly urged that the various Greens groups in Australia develop a national identity. Partly as a result of this, 50 Greens activists gathered in Tasmania in December to organise a national conference.

The title "The Greens" had been first registered in Sydney in the 1980s by what The Monthly Magazine described as "a band of inner-city radicals committed to resident action, nuclear disarmament and urban environmental causes, such as stopping expressways and preserving parklands". The group formed as the Sydney Greens and evolved into the Green Alliance, with the stated aim of not forming a "traditional hierarchy party". According to party co-ordinator Hall Greenland, when amalgamation with Bob Brown's Tasmanian movement was first mooted, Brown was hesitant owing to what he perceived as the "anarchic leftism" of the Sydney movement. The Greens NSW and The Greens (WA) were also wary of amalgamation owing to local autonomy concerns and a 1986 attempt by Brown to form a national party failed. However, Drew Hutton, a founder of the Queensland Greens in 1990, was a driving force for the national party's formation and the movement continued. In an effort to reduce the influence of the Democratic Socialist Party (formerly Socialist Workers Party, now Socialist Alliance) in The Greens NSW, Brown successfully moved for a ban on dual party membership by Greens in 1991. Following formation of the national party in 1992, regional emphasis variations remained within the Greens, with members of the "industrial left" remaining a presence in the New South Wales branch.

The Green movement gained its first federal parliamentary representative when Senator Jo Vallentine of Western Australia, who had been elected in 1984 for the Nuclear Disarmament Party and later sat as an independent, was part of the formation of and joined The Greens (WA), a party formed in Western Australia, and not affiliated to the Australian Greens at that time.

In 1992, representatives from around the nation gathered in North Sydney and agreed to form the Australian Greens, although the state Greens parties, particularly in Western Australia, retained their separate identities for a period. Brown resigned from the Tasmanian Parliament in 1993, and in 1996 he was elected as a senator for Tasmania, the first elected as an Australian Greens candidate.

Initially the most successful Greens group during this period was The Greens (WA), at that time still a separate organisation from the Australian Greens. Vallentine was succeeded by Christabel Chamarette in 1992, and she was joined by Dee Margetts in 1993. But Chamarette was defeated in the 1996 federal election. Margetts opposed the industrial relations reform agenda of the Howard government. Following the 'Cavalcade to Canberra' protest of 19 August 1996, in which 2000 breakaway civilians rioted in and around Parliament House, Margetts told the Senate that "The Greens (WA) do not associate ourselves with the violent action" and that while "there are obviously some in the Greens movement who have differing opinions about that" she personally did not think there was "any justification for the use of violence to the extent that we saw". Margetts lost her seat in the 1998 federal election, leaving Brown as the sole Australian Greens senator.

== Leadership of Bob Brown ==
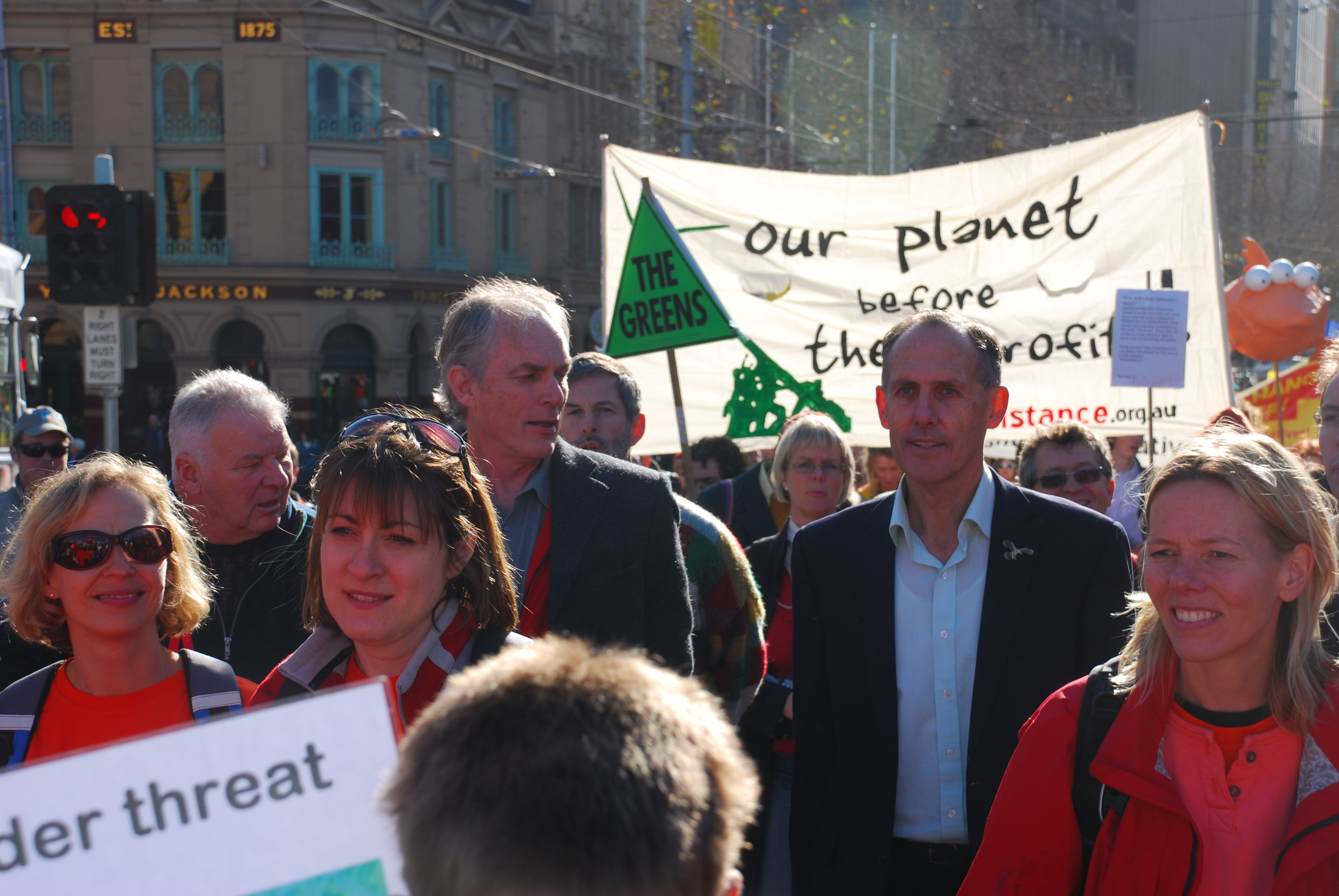
Bob Brown at a climate change rally in Melbourne on 5 July 2008

The national party initially resisted appointing a party leader, however Bob Brown was later selected. The New South Wales Greens remained ideologically opposed to appointing a leader and continue not to appoint such a position. The WA Greens had lost office in the Senate by 1998, leaving Bob Brown as the sole representative of the party. Thereafter, the national vote was set to increase consecutively at elections up until 2010.

=== 2001 federal election onward ===
In the 2001 federal election, Brown was re-elected as a senator for Tasmania, and a second Greens senator, Kerry Nettle, was elected in New South Wales. The Greens opposed the Howard government's Pacific Solution of offshore processing for asylum seekers, and opposed the bipartisan offers of support to the US alliance and Afghanistan War by the government and Beazley Opposition in the aftermath of the 11 September terrorist attacks in 2001, describing the Afghanistan commitment as "warmongering". This contributed to increased support for the Greens by disaffected Labor Party voters and helped identify the Greens as more than just a single-issue environmental party. On 19 October 2002 the Greens won a House of Representatives seat for the first time when Michael Organ won the Cunningham by-election.

In the lead-up to the Iraq War, in September 2002, Bob Brown said that the Greens would oppose military action in Iraq regardless of the position of the United Nations Security Council and said that any conflict would be "a vengeance for the S11 attack that's involved here as well as the American corporations wanting to get their hands on the Iraqi oil" and that if Saddam Hussein "does have weapons of mass destruction, the attack might be the thing that gets him to use them", so it would be better to "resolv[e] the Palestinian crisis, which could lead—open up a real avenue to peace in the Middle East, and neutralise Saddam Hussein by doing it".

=== 2004 federal election onward ===
In the 2004 federal election, the Greens' primary vote rose by 2.3% to 7.2%. This won them two additional Senate seats, taken by Christine Milne in Tasmania and Rachel Siewert in Western Australia, bringing the total to four. However, the success of the Howard government in winning a majority in the Senate meant that the Greens' influence on legislation decreased. Michael Organ was defeated by the Labor Party candidate in Cunningham.

Additionally, in the 2004 election there was an intense media campaign from the socially conservative Family First Party, including a television advertisement labelling the Greens the "Extreme Greens". Competitive preferencing strategies prompted by the nature of Senate balloting (see Australian electoral system) lead to the Australian Labor Party and the Democrats ranking Family First higher than the Greens on their Senate tickets, and the Greens losing preferences they would normally have received from the two parties. Consequently, although outpolling Family First by a ratio of more than four to one first-preference votes, Victorian Family First candidate Steve Fielding was elected on preferences over the Australian Greens' David Risstrom, an unintended consequence of these strategies. In Tasmania, Christine Milne only narrowly gained her Senate seat before a Family First candidate, despite obtaining almost the full required quota of primary votes. It was only the high incidence of "below-the-line" voting in Tasmania that negated the effect of the preference-swap deal between Labor and Family First.

The Australian Greens fielded candidates in every House of Representatives seat in Australia, and for all state and territory Senate positions. The Greens (WA) were able to win Legislative Council seats in rural and remote-area seats (Mining and Pastoral, Agricultural and South West provinces).

In 2005, the Greens' Lee Rhiannon lobbied the Vatican to reject Australian Cardinal George Pell as a candidate for the Papacy on the basis of his support for conservative Catholic moral doctrine. In 2007, Rhiannon referred remarks made by Pell opposing embryonic stem cell research to the New South Wales parliamentary privileges committee for allegedly being in "contempt of parliament". Pell was cleared of the charge and described the move as a "clumsy attempt to curb religious freedom and freedom of speech".

The Australian Greens' primary vote increased by 4.1% in the 2006 South Australia election, 1.% in the 2006 Queensland election, and 0.7% in the 2007 election in New South Wales.

The results for the 2006 Victoria election were mixed, with an improved vote for the Greens in the lower house, but a fall in their upper-house vote.

Against this upward trend was a swing of 1.5% away from the Greens in the 2006 Tasmania state election.

On 31 August 2004, the Melbourne newspaper the Herald Sun published a page-three-story by journalist Gerard McManus entitled "Greens back illegal drugs" in the lead-up to the 2004 federal election. In response to the article, Brown lodged a complaint with the Australian Press Council. After the election, the Press Council upheld Brown's complaint. An appeal by the Herald Sun was dismissed and it was ordered to publish the Press Council's adjudication.

At the 2004 election, the Australian Greens would replace the Australian Democrats as the largest third party in elections. As of 2025 the Greens would be the largest third party.

=== 2007 federal election onward ===
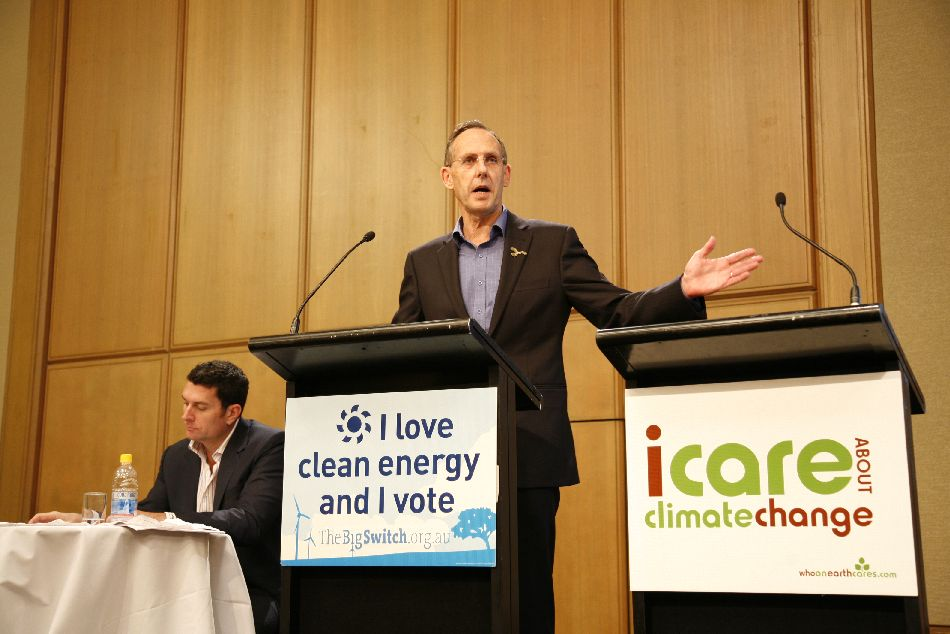
Bob Brown lays out the Greens' climate change policies in the lead-up to the 2007 federal election

As in previous years, the Greens' vote was strongest in inner-city seats, including Melbourne (22.7% of primary votes), Sydney (20.7%), Grayndler (18.7%), Denison (18.6%) and Batman (17.2%). Strong votes were also recorded in Liberal-held city based seats such as Higgins (10.8%), Kooyong (11.8%) Curtin (13.4%) and Wentworth (15.0%). The primary vote for the Greens in suburban and regional areas was generally smaller.

The Greens directly contributed to Howard's defeat in his own electorate, the Sydney-area seat of Bennelong. Greens candidate Lindsay Peters received 5.5% of the primary vote. He was eliminated after the 14th count, and more than three-fourths of his preferences went to Labor challenger Maxine McKew. This margin was enough to make McKew only the second person to unseat a sitting prime minister.

The Greens increased their national vote by 1.38 points to 9.04% at the 2007 federal election, with a net increase of one senator to a total of five. Senators Bob Brown (Tas) and Kerry Nettle (NSW) were up for re-election, Brown was re-elected, but Nettle was unsuccessful, becoming the only Australian Greens senator to lose their seat. Elected at the 2001 federal election on a primary vote of 4.36% in New South Wales with One Nation and micro-party preference flows, she failed to gain re-election in 2007 due to preferences, despite an increase in the New South Wales Green primary vote to 8.43%.

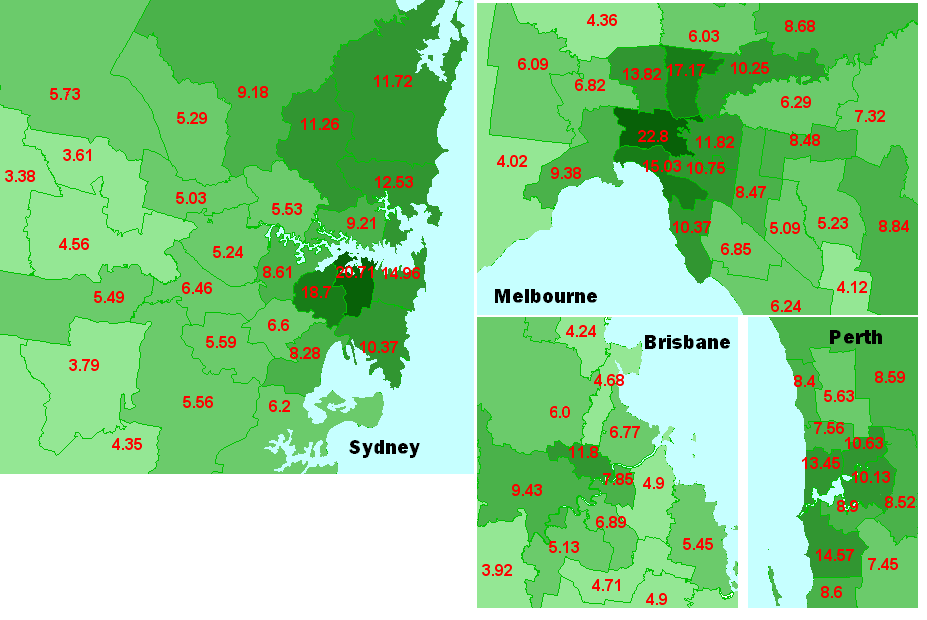
Percentage of lower house first preference Green votes at the 2007 federal election in selected Australian cities

Other Greens Senate candidates were Larissa Waters (Qld), Richard Di Natale (Vic), Scott Ludlam (WA), Sarah Hanson-Young (SA) and Kerrie Tucker (ACT). Ludlam and Hanson-Young were elected and took up office on 26 August 2008 when all senators elected on 24 November 2007 were sworn in.

This was also the first general election for the Greens in which a lower house seat went "maverick". In the Division of Melbourne, the Greens polled 22.80% of the primary vote, overtaking the Liberals on preferences, finishing on a two-party-preferred figure of 45.29% against Labor.

An extensive campaign was undertaken in the ACT, in an attempt to end coalition control of the Senate immediately after the election, as territory senators take their place at this time as opposed to their state counterparts on the next 1 July. The ACT elects two seats with terms (in parallel with those of the House of Representatives), so a larger quota than normal is required for election. Despite a swing of 5.1 points to the Greens, on 21.5%, their best result in any state or territory, the party fell significantly short of the required quota.

At the 2008 Northern Territory election, the Greens ran in six of the 25 seats in the unicameral parliament, averaging 16% of the vote but won no seats. At the 2008 Western Australian election, the Greens won 11–12 percent of the statewide vote in both the lower and upper houses, with four of 36 seats in the latter, an increase of two.

In the 2008 Australian Capital Territory election, conducted under the Hare-Clark system of proportional representation, the Greens doubled their vote to around 15%, going from one to four seats in the 17-member unicameral parliament, giving them the balance of power. After almost two weeks of deliberations, the Greens chose to allow Labor to form a minority government. The Greens held the post of Speaker in the ACT Legislative Assembly, the first for a Green party in Australia.

In November 2008, Senator Christine Milne was elected deputy leader in a ballot contested against Senator Rachel Siewert.

In May 2009, the Greens won their second-ever single-member electorate, with Adele Carles winning the Fremantle by-election for the Western Australian Legislative Assembly. The seat had been held by the Labor Party since 1924. It was the first time the Greens had outpolled the Labor Party on the primary vote in any Labor-held seat.

In December 2009, the Greens received over 30 percent of the primary vote in the federal Higgins by-election in Victoria, in the absence of a Labor candidate. It is the highest primary vote recorded by the Greens in a Liberal-held lower-house seat.

At the 2010 Tasmanian election, the Greens won 21.6 percent of the primary vote amongst the five multi-member electorates, resulting in the Greens winning five of twenty-five seats in the lower house and holding the balance of power. With Labor and the Liberals winning ten seats each, the Greens backed a Labor minority government. Tasmanian Greens Leader Nick McKim was appointed to the new Labor-Green cabinet, making him the first Green Minister in Australia. With a 21.6 percent of the primary vote, it is the Greens highest ever vote in a state election as of 2024.

In the lead-up to the 2010 Australian federal election, the Australian Christian Lobby and the Catholic Archbishop of Sydney criticised Greens policies as "anti-Christian". In an 8 August opinion article for Sydney's Sunday Telegraph newspaper, Cardinal Archbishop George Pell wrote that the Greens were hostile to the family, opposed to religious schools, had pressured against Catholic management of Calvary Hospital in Canberra and said the party contained Stalinists and a wing who were "watermelons" -"green on the outside, red on the inside" whose policies were "impractical and expensive, which will not help the poor". In response to the article, Senator Bob Brown said Pell was "bearing false witness" and that the Greens were in fact, "much closer to mainstream Christian thinking than Cardinal Pell". Jesuit human rights lawyer Fr. Frank Brennan responded in an essay by saying that while some Greens might be anti-Christian, others like Lin Hatfield Dodds "have given distinguished public service in their churches for decades." On some policy issues, wrote Brennan, "the Greens have a more Christian message than the major parties", while on issues such as abortion, stem-cell research, same-sex marriage and funding for church schools, the party would never be able to "carry the day given that policy changes in these areas will occur only if they are supported by a majority from both major political parties".

In the lead up to the 2010 election, Bob Brown opposed the senate pre-selection of high-profile New South Wales Green Lee Rhiannon in favour of environmentalist Cate Faehrmann, saying that the Greens needed "new blood". Rhiannon, a socialist who had also campaigned on gun control, foreign aid, political donations and urban renewal said that there were differing visions for the future of the Greens – one of increased centralisation of party decision making versus a vision she supported of empowering membership. Rhiannon was confirmed as the candidate.

=== 2010 federal election onward ===
Federal Senate election results
(Greens – percent of overall vote)

- 1996: 2.4%
- 1998: 2.7%
- 2001: 4.9%
- 2004: 7.7%
- 2007: 9.0%
- 2010: 13.1%
- 2013: 8.7%
- 2016: 8.7%
- 2019: 10.2%

At the 2010 federal election the Greens received a four percent swing to finish with 13 percent of the vote (more than 1.6 million votes) in the Senate, a first for any Australian minor party. The Senate vote throughout the states was between 10 and 20 percent. The Greens won a seat in each of the six states at the election, again a first for any Australian minor party, bringing the party to a total of nine senators from July 2011, holding the balance of power in the Senate. The new senators were Lee Rhiannon in New South Wales, Richard Di Natale in Victoria, Larissa Waters in Queensland, Rachel Siewert in Western Australia, Penny Wright in South Australia and Christine Milne in Tasmania. Incumbents Scott Ludlam in Western Australia, Sarah Hanson-Young in South Australia and Bob Brown in Tasmania were not due for re-election. The Greens also won their first House of Representatives seat at a general election, the seat of Melbourne with candidate Adam Bandt, who was a crossbencher in the first hung parliament since the 1940 federal election. Almost two weeks after the election, Bandt and the Greens agreed to support a Gillard Labor minority government on confidence and supply votes. Labor was returned to government with the additional support of three independent crossbenchers.

The election resulted in a hung parliament. Six crossbench MPs shared the balance of power. The Greens signed a formal agreement with the Australian Labor Party involving consultation in relation to policy and support in the House of Representatives in relation to confidence and supply and three of the independents declared their support for Labor on confidence and supply, allowing Gillard and Labor to remain in power with a 76–74 minority government.

In the 2010 Victorian election, the Liberal party directed voters to preference the ALP ahead of the Greens. The Greens' primary vote increased slightly overall from 10.04% to 10.6% of the overall vote, but the party did not win any lower-house seats. Federal Greens leader Bob Brown said of the result that it was positive but that: "The Liberals' preferencing to Labor means that instead of there being three Greens in the new parliament there won't be".

On 24 February 2011, in a joint press conference of the "Climate Change Committee" – comprising the Government, Greens and two independent MPs – Prime Minister Gillard announced a plan to legislate for the introduction of a fixed price to be imposed on "carbon pollution" from 1 July 2012 The carbon price would be placed for three to five years before a full emissions trading scheme is implemented, under a blueprint agreed by a multi-party parliamentary committee. Key issues remained to be negotiated between the Government and the cross-benches, including compensation arrangements for households and businesses, the carbon price level, the emissions reduction target and whether or not to include fuel in the price.

The Greens support protecting the welfare of the people of Libya and so supported the United States-led military intervention in Libya. The view of Deputy leader Christine Milne, that the Greens "want to make sure that [they] protect civilians wherever [they] can... to ensur[e] that we will save lives...", is commensurate with this position.

At the Greens NSW State Conference, which was held prior to the New South Wales state election in 2011, a resolution was adopted in support for the Boycott, Divestment and Sanctions campaign against Israel. The move, proposed by Sylvia Hale and backed by Lee Rhiannon, had already been rejected by Leader Bob Brown. Soon after, however, their motion was backed by the Marrickville Council – resulting in a "boycott [against] all goods made in Israel and any sporting, academic, government or cultural exchanges". Local Labor MP Anthony Albanese called the move "misguided", sparking media interest and inciting anger among many Jewish Australians. The move also caused a rift within the Greens. Following the 2010 election, Bob Brown said that he had conveyed his disapproval of this policy to Rhiannon. Brown said that the policy was "a mistake" made by the NSW branch whereas Rhiannon said it had not been prosecuted hard enough.

Amidst ongoing debate over taxation, industry policy and climate change, Leader Bob Brown began to refer to sections within the Australian media that expressed criticism of Greens' policies or candidates as the "hate media", singling out the Murdoch Press in particular.

Outlining his industry and climate policies on ABC's 7:30 Program in May 2011, Bob Brown voiced support for a reduction in subsidies to fossil fuel industries, the implementation of a price on carbon; a higher level of profit tax on the mining industry and a phasing out of Australia's coal export industry, saying: "The world is going to do that because it is causing massive economic damage down the line through the impact of climate change."

In 2011, the Greens called for the permanent closure of Australia's live export meat industry, following revelations of mistreatment of Australian cattle in some Indonesian abattoirs.

On 24 March 2012 Queensland election the total primary vote for The Queensland Greens fell by 0.84% to 7.53%.

== Leadership of Christine Milne ==
On 13 April 2012, Bob Brown announced that he was resigning as federal parliamentary leader of the Australian Greens and that he would leave the Senate in June. Christine Milne was elected unanimously as the new leader by the party. MP Adam Bandt was elected deputy leader.

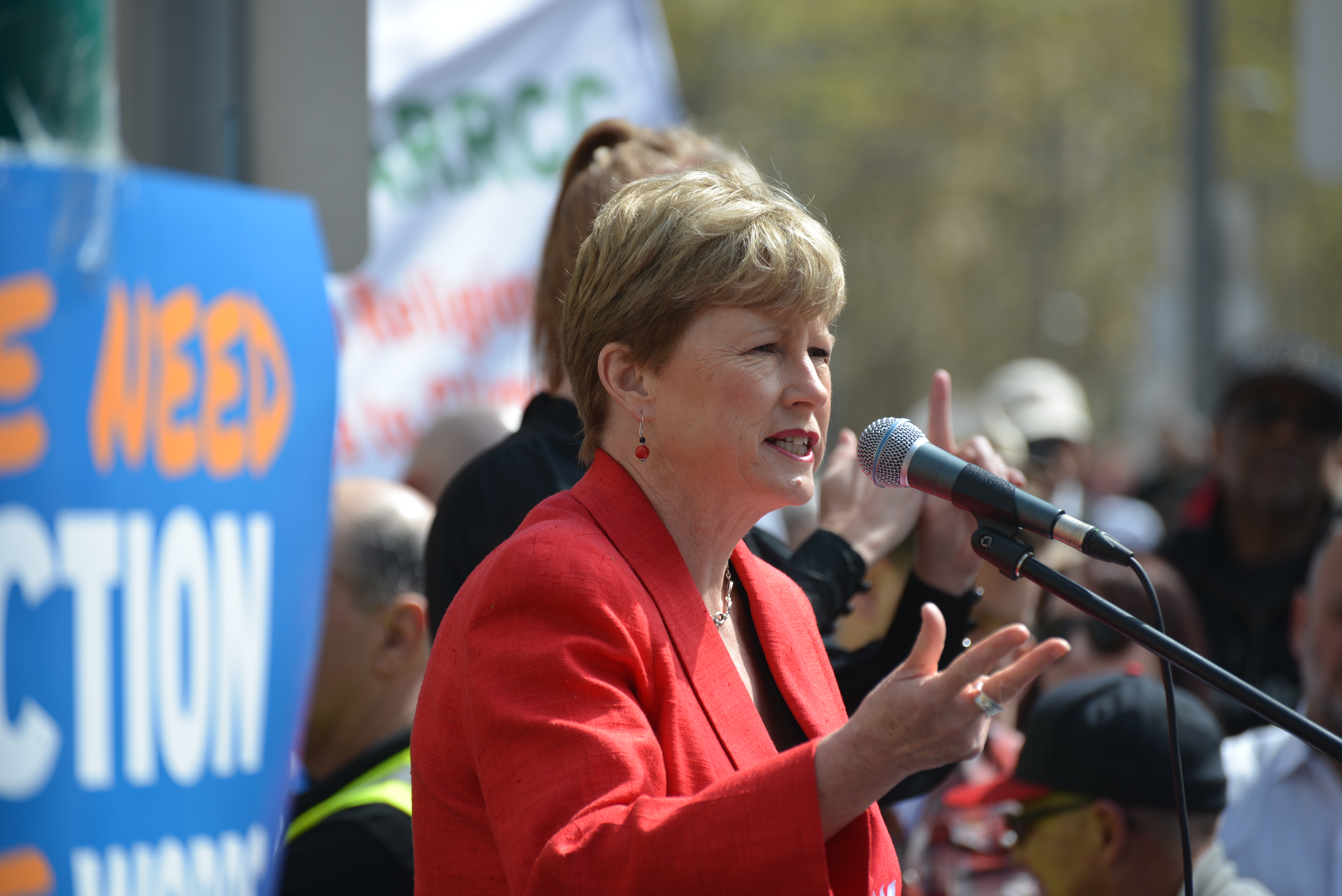
Christine Milne speaking at the Peoples Climate March in Melbourne in September 2014

The "ease of the Greens leadership transition" was widely praised, with one commentator noting "She has survived the transition in leadership with grace and steadfastness of vision" , and Milne set about expanding the party's reach, looking first to regional Australia.

Milne took the leadership at a time when the Greens nationally had passed a peak. In the 18 months between the high water mark of the 2010 federal election and Brown's retirement, polls nationally were trending downwards. This was reflected in a number of setbacks for state and local Greens parties, which some commentators blamed on Brown's absence. The outcome of 20 October 2012 election in the ACT resulted in a reduction of Greens Legislative Assembly members, from four to one. The Western Australian election was held in March 2013. For the Legislative Assembly, the total primary vote for the Greens fell by 3.52% to 8.40%. In the Legislative Council the Greens' representation was reduced from four to two members.

Even some impressive results which failed to deliver wins, such as the 2012 Melbourne state by-election, where the Greens received the highest number of first preference votes but did not win the seat as some had expected, were used to attack Milne.

In a 19 February address to the National Press Club in Canberra, Christine Milne announced that the Federal Greens alliance with the Labor Party was "effectively over". In particular, Milne cited a failure by the Gillard government to redraft the mining tax it had concluded prior to the 2010 Election as evidence that the government had "walked away" from its agreement with the Greens. Nevertheless, Milne promised to continue to guarantee confidence and supply to the Labor government on the floor of Parliament, so as not to "advance the interests" of Opposition Leader Tony Abbott.

Milne was aware that the period in balance of power would be electorally costly for the party, telling members that "You earn political capital in opposition and you spend it in power." With that in mind, and following the disappointing state results, Milne and the Australian Greens set as their goal for the 2013 election a clear target of retaining their existing seats and perhaps win one more Senate seat in Victoria, rather than to increase the vote nationally. Despite a reduction in the vote, maintaining and slightly increasing parliamentary representation is exactly what Milne achieved.

Christine Milne resigned as leader of the Australian Greens on 6 May 2015. Milne was replaced by Victorian senator Richard Di Natale, with Adam Bandt being replaced as deputy leader by Larissa Waters and Scott Ludlam at the same time.

== Leadership of Richard Di Natale ==
Richard Di Natale became leader of the Australian Greens following Christine Milne's resignation, on 6 May 2015.

Under the frontbench of Richard Di Natale, the party has taken a much more pragmatic approach to policy and dealing with government legislation than under previous leaders.

The party voted in support for legislation that saw assets testing for age pensions reduced from $1M down to $800,000. The Greens also negotiated with the government and secured a tax disclosure threshold for big businesses earning more than $200M a year.

In November 2016 the Greens voted with the Turnbull government to levy a 15% tax on foreign backpackers on working holiday visas.

=== 2013 federal election onward ===
Top 10 primary votes in 2013

- Melbourne (Vic): 42.6%
- Batman (Vic): 26.4%
- Grayndler (NSW): 23.0%
- Wills (Vic): 22.2%
- Melbourne Ports (Vic): 20.2%
- Richmond (NSW): 17.7%
- Sydney (NSW): 17.3%
- Higgins (Vic): 16.8%
- Gellibrand (Vic): 16.7%
- Kooyong (Vic): 16.6%

At the 2013 federal election the House of Representatives (lower house) primary vote was 8.7 percent (−3.1) with the Senate (upper house) primary vote at 8.7 percent (−4.5). Despite that, as targeted, the Greens representation in the parliament increased. Adam Bandt retained his Melbourne seat with a primary vote of 42.6 percent (+7.0) and a two-candidate preferred vote of 55.3 percent (−0.6). The Greens won four Senate positions, increasing their Senate representation from nine to ten Senators to take effect from 1 July 2014, to a total of eleven Green members in the Parliament of Australia.

Writing in the Australian Financial Review, Vincent Mahon, a former campaign manager for the Greens, said that while the Greens were able to present positive achievements to the electors relating to education, health, the environment and the promotion of clean energy, the party was unable to attract disenchanted Labor voters. He noted that Green policies relating to carbon pricing and refugees were unpopular with many voters. Christine Milne said that the Greens support of the Labor minority government was a factor in the Greens' lower vote.

Following the federal election, South Australian Greens Senator, Sarah Hanson-Young, who had lost a ballot against Senator Milne for Deputy Leadership and lost again to Adam Bandt, publicly criticised Senator Milne.

In September 2013, it was reported that six senior Greens' staffers had resigned including Chief of Staff, Ben Oquist, who claimed there were, "fundamental differences of opinion on strategy". There have been suggestions that Oquist was behind the unsuccessful attempt to create leadership tensions because he feared moves to "freeze him out".

At the 2014 Western Australian Senate election the Greens won in excess of a quota with the primary vote increasing from 9.5 to 15.6 percent, re-electing Scott Ludlam. Ludlam threw his weight behind Milne's leadership, telling ABC radio on being asked if he had leadership ambitions that "That's very flattering, but Christine Milne is doing a great job".

On 17 July 2015, Wright announced that she would be resigning from the Senate due to illness in her family.

=== 2016 federal election onward ===
Top 10 primary votes in 2016

- Melbourne (Vic): 43.75%
- Batman (Vic): 36.23%
- Wills (Vic): 30.83%
- Higgins (Vic): 25.33%
- Melbourne Ports (Vic): 23.79%
- Grayndler (NSW): 22.24%
- Gellibrand (Vic): 21.48%
- Richmond (NSW): 20.44%
- Brisbane (Qld): 19.4%
- Kooyong (Vic): 18.92%

At the 2016 federal election the House of Representatives (lower house) primary vote increased to 10.23 percent (+1.58) but decreased in the Senate (upper house), with primary vote at 8.65 percent (−0.58). Adam Bandt was elected to a third term in his Melbourne seat with a primary vote of 43.75 percent (+1.13) and a two-candidate preferred vote of 68.48 percent (+13.21). Despite a campaign focus on winning additional seats in the lower house, The Greens failed to win any lower house contests. Their closest seats were Batman, where the Greens won the most first preference votes and turned the once safe Labor seat into a marginal Labor vs Green seat, and Melbourne Ports, where the Greens were fewer than 1,000 votes off overtaking Labor, which would have likely (but not certainly) resulted in a Greens victory. Wills, Higgins, Grayndler and Division of Warringah saw Greens make the two-candidate-preferred result. Deposits were retained in 141 of the 150 seats.

The Greens also lost one Senate position in South Australia, decreasing their Senate representation from ten to nine Senators, to a total of ten Green members in the Parliament of Australia. The result was seen as disappointing, and caused internal divisions to flare up, with former Federal Leader Bob Brown calling upon Senator Lee Rhiannon to resign, citing the "need for renewal".

Tensions within the party reached a flashpoint in late 2016 when a group of Greens members announced their intention to form a faction within the party called "Left Renewal". Their stated aim is to "end capitalism" and stop "global imperialism". The faction's existence is supported by Senator Lee Rhiannon and State MP David Shoebridge, however party leader Richard Di Natale has publicly criticised the grouping saying its manifesto was "ridiculous" and its members should consider leaving the Greens. Former leader Bob Brown also attacked the group calling it "a joke".

In June 2017 Lee Rhiannon was suspended from the Federal Greens party room following an internal dispute over her opposition to the Federal Greens' support for the Turnbull government education funding changes. The Greens New South Wales subsequently issued a statement reiterating its support for Senator Rhiannon and support for public education.

On 14 July 2017, Ludlam resigned from the Senate after he found that he had dual Australian-New Zealand citizenship. The next week on 18 July 2017, his former co-deputy, and Queensland Senator, Larissa Waters resigned, after discovering that she held dual citizenship with Canada, and that had she been born a week later that would not have been the case. Both were ineligible to be elected to Parliament under section 44 of the Australian Constitution. Subsequently, Adam Bandt and Rachel Siewert were named as temporary co-deputy leaders until the arrival of Ludlam and Waters' replacements in Canberra.

In the lead up to the preselection for the Greens NSW Senate position in 2017, it was reported that Senator Rhiannon had breached party rules by allowing supporters to visit her in her Sydney electorate office. Rhiannon lost her first position on the NSW Senate ticket, with this position instead going to NSW Greens MLC Mehreen Faruqi. Rhiannon announced on 25 May 2019 that she would be resigning from the party in mid-August, to allow Faruqi to fill her vacancy. Faruqi had a 25-year career working as a professional engineer and academic, and had previously served in the New South Wales Legislative Council from 2013 to 2018, before assuming her new position in the Federal Parliament. Faruqi became the first female Muslim Senator in Australian history.

=== 2019 federal election onward ===
Leading up to the 2019 election, Di Natale stated that, "Climate change matters more than anything else at this election because it is, quite literally, an existential threat to humanity. This has got to be a climate change election because we're running out of time."

Key pledges and policy proposals of the party for the 2019 election included:

- "Renewable economy and climate change": transitioning to 100% renewable energy by 2030; creating 180,000 jobs in renewable energy; creating a publicly owned renewable energy provider and reducing power bills; providing support for coal workers; supporting the "electric vehicle revolution"; public transport investment; and ending political donations from mining companies
- "Clean up politics": political donation reform; banning MPs from entering lobbying jobs after leaving Parliament; establishing a federal anti-corruption commission; protecting the rights of citizens; restoring funding to the ABC and SBS
- "World-class health, education and social services": introducing dental and mental health into Medicare; reducing costs of essential services such as disability services, childcare, mental health and aged care services; increasing Newstart and Youth Allowance; providing free university and TAFE for the first three years; expanding the aged care workforce; drug law reform
- "Public ownership, not privatisation": creating a not-for-profit energy retailer; capping power prices and buying back essential energy infrastructure; creating a not-for-proft bank; breaking up the big banks and capping executive pay; opposing the selling off of the NBN
- "Protect our environment": reforming environmental laws; addressing the waste crisis and expanding recycling facilities; ending deforestation; stopping oil and gas exploration in the Great Australian Bight; saving the Great Barrier Reef; banning new coal seam gas and fracking projects; addressing animal cruelty
- "A home for all": building 500,000 public and community homes; giving renters legal rights; providing $30 million for tenancy advocacy services; supporting first-home buyers; funding for temporary accommodation services to address homelessness
- "Jobs and training for the future": increasing wages; rewriting workplace laws; implementing a Future of Work Commission; science, research and innovation investment; closing the gender wage gap; growing the "creative economy"; extensive plans to support small businesses
- "A fairer, more equal community": establishing a path for First Nations sovereignty and treaties and "closing the gap"; closing offshore detention; supporting diversity and women in the workplace; addressing systemic racism and hate speech; funding the NDIS; ending sexual orientation and gender identity change efforts ('conversion therapy'); creating a charter of rights; and supporting demilitarisation
- "Paying for our plans": introducing a super profits tax on oil, gas and mining giants; ending billions of dollars of government handouts to large corporations; making big corporations pay for pollution; closing tax avoidance of multinationals; reversing tax cuts to shareholders and the "super wealthy"

Top 10 primary votes in 2019

- Melbourne (Vic): 49.3%
- Wills (Vic): 26.6%
- Macnamara (Vic): 24.2%
- Griffith (Qld): 23.7%
- Canberra (ACT): 23.3%
- Grayndler (NSW): 22.6%
- Higgins (Vic): 22.5%
- Brisbane (Qld): 22.4%
- Kooyong (Vic): 21.2%
- Cooper (Vic): 21.1%

At the 2019 federal election, the Australian Greens received a primary vote of 10.7% in the House of Representatives, with a federal swing of +0.2%. The party's highest vote was captured in the Australian Capital Territory (17.1%), followed by Victoria (12.1%), Western Australia (11.9%), Queensland (10.5%), Northern Territory (10.5%), Tasmania (10.3%), South Australia (9.8%) and New South Wales (9.0%).

On a state-by-state basis in the House of Representatives, the party received favourable swings in South Australia (+3.4%), the Australian Capital Territory (+1.8%), Queensland (+1.5%) and the Northern Territory (+1.1%) but suffered swings in Victoria (−1.2%), Western Australia (−0.4%), New South Wales (−0.2%) and Tasmania (−0.1%).

The party retained the federal electorate of Melbourne with Adam Bandt sitting at a 71.8% two-party preferred vote. The Greens also entered the two-party preferred vote in the electorates of Kooyong (44.3% vs. LIB), Wills (41.8% vs. LAB), Cooper (35.4% vs. LAB) and Grayndler (33.7% vs. LAB).

In the Senate, the Greens received favourable swings in South Australia (+5.03%), Queensland (+3.12%), the Australian Capital Territory (+1.61%), Western Australia (+1.48%), Tasmania (+1.41%) and New South Wales (+1.32%). Small swings against the Greens in the Senate were observed in only Victoria (-0.25%) and the Northern Territory (−0.54%). All 6 Greens Senators up for re-election retained their seats, including Senators Mehreen Faruqi, Janet Rice, Larissa Waters, Sarah Hanson-Young, Jordon Steele-John and Nick McKim.

Three key seats were targeted by the Greens in Victoria, including Kooyong, Higgins and Macnamara. Prominent barrister Julian Burnside, who stood for Kooyong, came close to unseating treasurer and deputy Liberal leader Josh Frydenberg, falling short by 5.7% in the two-party preferred vote. Greens candidate Jason Ball, for the electorate of Higgins, failed to enter the two-party preferred vote, despite optimism within the Greens and a diminishing Liberal vote. In Macnamara (formerly Melbourne Ports), a three-way contest emerged between the Liberals, Labor and Greens. Greens candidate Steph Hodgins-May had come within a few hundred votes in 2016 of taking the seat, however, redistributions in the electorate for the 2019 election were unfavourable for the Greens' vote, and the party's final vote sat at 24.2%.

Post-election, Richard Di Natale was re-endorsed as the Party's leader, and Adam Bandt and Larissa Waters resumed their positions as the party's deputy positions. Rachel Siewert took on the role of party whip and Janet Rice became the party room chair.

The Greens saw an increase in party membership by approximately 10% following the 2019 election, adding more than 1700 new members. Di Natale attributed this rise in membership as "clearly a response to the election", continuing that, "For a lot of people the way to respond to what was for many of them a devastating result, was to actually take some action. ... This election was described as a 'climate election'. Every election from this point on will be a climate election. We're breaking record, on record, with extreme weather, drought. And I think the community's only going to become increasingly concerned about the lack of [climate] action." Following the dramatic increase in votes for the German Greens Party—where their vote increased from 9% in the 2017 German election to 20.5% in the 2019 European elections—Di Natale has argued that, "there's a real possibility of the [Australian] Greens seeing that big increase—a similar increase to the increase we saw in Germany."

The Greens were the target of deceitful attacks during the ongoing 2019–2020 bushfire crisis. Several Liberal-National MPs and media outlets pushed a conspiracy started by Barnaby Joyce blaming the party for contributing to the fires, falsely claiming that the Greens' policies had prevented hazard reduction and back-burning. However the party has always supported fire prevention techniques including both hazard reduction and back-burning, and the party has never had its fire management policies implemented at a state or federal level. Furthermore, Deputy Prime Minister Michael McCormack described those concerned about the link between climate change and bushfires "raving inner-city lunatics". According to Greg Mullins, former Fire and Rescue Commissioner, "Blaming 'greenies' for stopping these important measures is a familiar, populist, but basically untrue claim." The fires have been linked by scientists to drier and hotter conditions caused by climate change and a lack of resources.

The party is calling for an Australian version of the Green New Deal, an economic program developed by US Democrats, Alexandria Ocasio-Cortez and Ed Markey, that advocates for renewable energy investment, the creation of new jobs, decarbonising the economy and dealing with economic inequality.

On 3 February 2020, Di Natale announced his resignation as leader of the Greens and federal parliament, and his retirement from federal politics, citing a desire to spend time with his family and children.

== Leadership of Adam Bandt (2020–2025) ==
Adam Bandt was elected leader of the party on 4 February 2020 following the resignation of Richard Di Natale the previous day. At the same time, Larissa Waters and Nick McKim were elected as co-deputy leaders; Waters was elected uncontested, while McKim defeated Sarah Hanson-Young and Mehreen Faruqi for the second deputy position.

In May 2020, 62% of rank-and-file Greens party members voted for democratically Leadership election to pick a leader, However it failed to meet the two-thirds majority of 66.67% which is required to force a change.

On 6 February 2023, Victorian Green senator Lidia Thorpe announced that she would resign from the Greens to become an independent senator, sitting on the crossbench, over disagreements concerning the proposed Indigenous Voice to Parliament.

The Greens lost Green leader Adam Bandt seat of Melbourne to Labor, Stephen Bates in the seat of Brisbane and Max Chandler-Mather in the seat of Griffith in the 2025 federal election.

== Leadership of Larissa Waters (2025–2026) ==
Larissa Waters was elected leader of the party on 15 May 2025 following the resignation of Adam Bandt after losing his seat of Melbourne in the 2025 Australian federal election. Mehreen Faruqi became her deputy leader at the same time.

Waters' leadership of the Greens focused on building a progressive parliament by working constructively with Labor. This was a response to the loss of 3 seats in the 2025 election which was blamed on the Greens' view as obstructionist by much of the mainstream Australian left. Under Waters' focus on cooperation the party extracted concessions from Labor including the removal of fossil fuel project fast-tracking, the addition of native forest protections, and the retention of federal oversight on water assessment in the Environment Protection Reform Act 2025.

Whilst the Greens won concessions from Labor in 2025, during 2026 the new policy of cooperation began to fail as Labor increasingly moved to the right to appeal to Liberal and National voters following the rise of One Nation in polls. This resulted in significant cooperation between Labor and the Liberal-National Coalition despite the Greens shedding their obstructionism to prevent this. For example, the Greens failed to extract a ban on gambling advertising and national online gambling regulatory body in the Interactive Gambling Amendment Bill 2026 with Labor instead agreeing to implement reforms proposed by the Coalition.

Waters resigned from her position as party leader on 28 September 2026 to recover from the symptoms of a preexisting kidney disease.

== Leadership of David Shoebridge (2026–) ==
David Shoebridge was elected leader of the party on 30 September 2026 following a three-way party vote between him and Steph Hodgins-May, Mehreen Faruqi and Nick Mckim, and Sarah Hanson-Young. The result of the second ballot runoff was a 7–4 victory for Shoebridge and Hodgins-May against Faruqi and Mckim.

Between the announcement of Waters' resignation and the vote taking place, calls for a full party membership vote to be implemented gained considerable traction after an open letter published by former Greens MP Max Chandler-Mather called for it. Faruqi and Mckim's campaign adopted support for a membership vote, as did newly elected deputy leader Steph Hodgins-May.

Shoebridge broke decisively with Waters' policy of cooperation with Labor, stating the party was here to replace rather than reform them, noting the lack of a meaningful Greens rise in polling despite the traditional two party system in the country coming under threat with the rise of One Nation. Immediately following his election as party leader, membership of the Greens rose by almost 900 new members.

== See also ==
- Australian Greens
