= Frontbench of Christine Milne =

Christine Milne led the Australian Greens from 2012 until 2015. During this period, members of parliament served as official spokespersons for the party both inside and outside of Parliament on various issues, each member being assigned portfolios for their speaking duties. This allows the Greens to shadow government policies and actions from the party perspective.

== First arrangement ==
Spokesperson	Portfolio
Christine Milne	Leader; Arts; Climate change; Assisting on Climate and Energy; Defence & National Security; Assisting on Defence; Assisting on National Security; Finance & Administration; Food Security; Foreign Affairs; Forests (TAS); Prime Minister & Cabinet; Regional Australia; Resources & Energy; Treasury; Whaling & Antarctica
Adam Bandt	Deputy leader; Assisting on Climate and Energy; Banking; Emergency Services; Employment & Workplace Relations; High Speed Rail; House of Representatives Reform; Innovation & Industry; Science & Research
Sarah Hanson-Young	Consumer Affairs; Human Rights; Immigration & Citizenship; LGBTI; Murray Darling Basin; Tibet; Water; Youth, Early Childhood Education & Child Care
Rachel Siewert	Aboriginal & Torres Strait Islander Issues; Ageing; Agriculture; Family, Community & Disability Services; Fisheries & Marine; Native Title; Natural Resource Management; The Kimberley & Northern Australia
Scott Ludlam	Assisting on Defence; Assisting on National Security; Broadband, Communications & the Digital Economy; Burma; Heritage; Housing; Infrastructure; Mining (WA); Nuclear; Sustainable Cities
Richard Di Natale	Dental Health; East Timor; Gambling; Health, including preventive; Multiculturalism; Sport; West Papua
Penny Wright	Attorney General; Mental Health; Schools & Education; Veterans Affairs
Larissa Waters	Cape York; Environment, Biodiversity & Natural Heritage; Great Barrier Reef & Coral Sea; Mining; Population; World Heritage
Lee Rhiannon	Animal Welfare; Democracy; Forests; Forests (TAS); Higher Education; International Aid & Development; Local Government; Transport; Women
Peter Whish-Wilson	Competition Policy & Small Business; Tourism; Trade; Waste

== Final arrangement ==
Spokesperson	Portfolio
Christine Milne	Leader; Arts; Climate change; Foreign Affairs; Prime Minister & Cabinet; Treasury
Adam Bandt	Deputy leader; Employment & Workplace Relations; Finance; Innovation, Industry & Science
Rachel Siewert	Aboriginal & Torres Strait Islander Issues; Agriculture & Rural Affairs; Family, Ageing, Community & Disability Services; Marine
Richard Di Natale	Health; Multiculturalism; Sport
Scott Ludlam	Broadband, Communications & the Digital Economy; Defence; Housing & Sustainable Cities; Nuclear
Sarah Hanson-Young	Early Childhood Education & Care; Immigration & Citizenship; LGBTI & Marriage Equality
Penny Wright	Attorney General; Mental Health; Schools
Larissa Waters	Environment & Biodiversity; Resources, Mining and CSG; Women
Lee Rhiannon	Animal Welfare; Democracy & Local Government; Higher Education; International Aid & Development; Water & Murray Darling Basin
Peter Whish-Wilson	Competition Policy, Small Business & Consumer Affairs; Fisheries, Marine (Tasmania) & Whaling; Trade; Veterans Affairs
Janet Rice	Forests; Tourism; Transport & Infrastructure
