= Frontbench of Bob Brown =

Bob Brown led the Australian Greens from 2005 until 2012. During this period, a select number of members of the parliamentary party served as official spokespersons for the party both inside and outside of Parliament on various issues, each member being assigned portfolios for their speaking duties. This allows the Greens to shadow government policies and actions from the party perspective.

== Final arrangement ==
Spokesperson	Portfolio
Bob Brown	Leader; Defence & National Security; Foreign Affairs; Forests (Tas); Prime Minister & Cabinet; Schools & Education; Treasury; Whaling & Antarctica
Christine Milne	Deputy leader; Arts; Climate change; Competition Policy & Small Business; Finance & Administration; Food Security; Regional Australia; Resources & Energy; Trade
Rachel Siewert	Aboriginal & Torres Strait Islander Issues; Ageing; Agriculture; Family, Community & Disability Services; Fisheries & Marine; Natural Resource Management; The Kimberley & Northern Australia
Sarah Hanson-Young	Consumer Affairs; Human Rights; Immigration & Citizenship; LGBTI; Murray Darling Basin; Tibet; Water; Youth, Early Childhood Education & Child Care
Scott Ludlam	Assisting on Defence; Broadband, Communications & the Digital Economy; Burma; Housing; Infrastructure; Mining (WA); Nuclear; Sustainable Cities; Transport; Waste
Richard Di Natale	Dental Health; East Timor; Gambling; Health, including preventive; Multiculturalism; Sport; West Papua
Penny Wright	Attorney General (excluding National Security); Heritage; Mental Health; Native Title; Social Inclusion; Veterans Affairs
Larissa Waters	Cape York; Environment, Biodiversity & Natural Heritage; Great Barrier Reef & Coral Sea; Mining; Population; Tourism; World Heritage
Lee Rhiannon	Animal Welfare; Assisting on National Security; Democracy; Forests; Higher Education; International Aid & Development; Local Government; Women
Adam Bandt	Assisting on Climate and Energy; Banking; Emergency Services; Employment & Workplace Relations; High Speed Rail; House of Representatives Reform; Innovation & Industry; Science & Research
