= Frontbench of The Greens NSW =

Frontbench of the Greens NSW in the 58th Parliament
- New South Wales
- The Greens NSW Partyroom
- Date formed: 2023

People and organisations
- Leader: No leader
- Total no. of members: 7 (3 MLAs, 4 MLCs)
- Member party: Greens NSW
- Status in legislature: Crossbench 7 / 135 (5%)

History
- Election: 2023
- Legislature term: 58th Parliament
- Predecessor: Arrangement in the 57th Parliament

The Greens NSW's frontbench consists of all Greens members of the Parliament of New South Wales, Australia, serving as the party's spokespeople inside Parliament on various issues, each member being assigned shadow portfolios for their speaking duties. This allows the Greens to shadow government policies and actions from the party perspective. Unlike its federal counterpart and the major state parties, the Greens New South Wales do not elect a parliamentary leader. A spokesperson for Premier and Cabinet is appointed to speak on matters of leadership.

== Arrangement (58th Parliament) ==
The following arrangement was in place following the 2023 New South Wales state election.

Role	Spokesperson
Human Rights and Anti-Discrimination; Industrial Relations; Anti-racism & Multiculturalism; Housing and Homelessness; Women	Jenny Leong MP
Active Transport; Anti-corruption & ICAC; Democracy; Plastics	Kobi Shetty MP
Education; Early Learning; Skills & TAFE; Premier & Cabinet; Older People; Tourism	Tamara Smith MP
Climate Change; Environment; Planning; Justice & Attorney General; First Nations’ Justice & Heritage; Agriculture; Regional Communities; North Coast; Mid North Coast; New England North West	Sue Higginson MLC
Health (including Mental Health); LGBTQIA+; Youth; Local Government; Emergency Services; Air Quality; Waste; Sport & Recreation; Central West; Western NSW; Riverina Murray	Dr Amanda Cohn MLC
Water; Mining, Coal & Gas; Transport, Infrastructure & Cities; Drug Law Reform & Harm Reduction; Gambling Harm Reduction; Healthy Oceans; Music & Night-time Economy; Innovation, Science & Technology; Illawarra & South Coast; Western Sydney	Cate Faehrmann MLC
Treasury, Finance & Economy; Industry, Jobs & Trade; Work Health & Safety; Energy & Just Transitions; Gendered Violence & Abuse; Animal Welfare; Disability Rights & Inclusion; Arts & Creative Industries; Hunter, Central Coast & Newcastle	Abigail Boyd MLC

== Arrangement (57th Parliament) ==
The following arrangement was in place prior to the 2023 New South Wales state election.

Role	Spokesperson
Climate Change; Local Government; Built Heritage; Anti-corruption; Premier & Cabinet; Sports & Recreation	Jamie Parker MP
Climate Change; Housing and Homelessness (including Renters); Women's Rights; Human Rights; Industrial Relations; Sex, Sexuality and Gender Identity / LGBTIQ+; Anti-racism & Multiculturalism	Jenny Leong MP
Climate Change; Planning; Water; Health, Mental Health & Wellbeing; Koalas; Oceans & Marine Life; Drug Law Reform & Harm Reduction; Music & Night-time Economy; Hospitality, Liquor & Gambling; Arts & Creative Industries; Waste & the Circular Economy; Active Transport; Region: Central West, Southern NSW & Illawarra; Region: Western Sydney	Cate Faehrmann MLC
Climate Change; Treasury, Finance & Economy; Domestic Violence & Abuse; Transport & Infrastructure; Disability; Animal Welfare; Children & Young People; Attorney General; Energy & Just Transitions; Women's Equity & Economic Justice; Sex Work; Older People; Region: Central Coast, Hunter and Newcastle	Abigail Boyd MLC
Climate Change; Regional Communities (including Regional Development); Tourism; Education; Region: North Coast	Tamara Smith MP
Climate Change; Environment; Mining, Coal and Gas, Justice; Emergency Services; First Nations Heritage; Agriculture; Renewable Energy; First Nations Justice; Employment; Region: Mid North Coast; Region: Riverina; Region: Western NSW	Sue Higginson MLC

== Arrangement (56th Parliament) ==
The following arrangement was in place prior to the 2019 New South Wales state election.

Role	Spokesperson
Corruption; Premier and Cabinet; Uranium; Urban Growth and Renewal	Jamie Parker MP
Attorney General and Justice and Aboriginal Justice; Child Protection; Corrective Services; Crown Lands; Industrial Relations and Insurance; Local Government; Newcastle, Hunter and Central Coast; Planning and Heritage; Police and Emergency Services (including gun control)	David Shoebridge MLC
Human Rights; Sexuality and Gender Identity; Tenancy, Rental Housing and Strata; WestConnex	Jenny Leong MP
Education; Renewable Energy; Regional Development	Tamara Smith MP
Environment; Transport, Roads and Ports; Status of Women; Animal Welfare; Arts and Creative Industries; Drugs and Harm Minimisation; Voluntary Euthanasia; Young People; Western Sydney	Cate Faehrmann MLC
Health; TAFE; Aboriginal Affairs; Ageing; Community Development and Resilience; Disability; Forestry; North Coast; Population Movements; Regional Arts; Regional Wellbeing and Equity; Koala Protection; Tourism	Dawn Walker MLC
Fair trading; Finance and Services; Illawarra/South Coast; Major events, hospitality and racing; Marine Parks and Fisheries; Small Business; Sport; Trade; Treasury; Urban water	Justin Field MLC

== Arrangement (55th Parliament) ==
As of 11 March 2015, the parliamentary portfolios of the Greens NSW were arranged as such:

Spokesperson	Portfolio
John Kaye	Education; Energy; Urban water; Health; Medical research; Mental health; Treasury; Gaming and Racing; Hospitality; Major events; Consumer Affairs and Fair Trading; Democracy; Premier and Cabinet; Special Minister of state
Jan Barham	Family & Community Services; Housing; Aging; Disability Services; Aboriginal Affairs; Arts & Tourism; Community development and resilience; Population movements; North Coast
Jeremy Buckingham	Mining; Primary Industries, Trade & Investment; Regional Infrastructure & Services; Sport & Recreation; Murray Darling Basin; Western NSW
Mehreen Faruqi	Environment; Marine Environment & Fisheries; Transport; Roads & Ports; Healthy Lifestyles; Dental Health; Drugs and Harm Minimisation; Status of Women; Sexuality & Gender Identity; Multiculturalism; Animal Welfare; Young People; Western Sydney
David Shoebridge	Forestry; Justice; Attorney General; Police; Emergency Services; Corrective Services; Planning & Heritage; Local Government; Firearms; Game Council; Industrial Relations; Insurance; Compensation; OH&S; Illawarra and South East
Jamie Parker	Matters concerning the electorate of Balmain

== Arrangement (54th Parliament) ==
As of 17 March 2011, the parliamentary portfolios of the Greens NSW were arranged as such:

Role	Spokesperson
Environment; Community Services; Primary Industries; Water; Disability Services; Aboriginal Affairs; Ageing; Emergency Services; Sport and Recreation; Tourism; Volunteering; Northern NSW	Ian Cohen MLC
Transport; Roads; Ports & Waterways; Mineral Resources; Healthy Communities; Animal welfare; Sexuality and gender identity; Multiculturalism/Ethnic Affairs; Arts; Small Business & Regulatory Reform; Industrial Relations; Rural Affairs; Women; Young people; South-East NSW; Western Sydney; Hunter	Cate Faehrmann MLC
Premier & Cabinet; Treasury; Finance; Education and Training; Energy; Health Services; Science & Medical Research; Water Utilities; Fair Trading; Electoral issues; Parliamentary processes; Gaming and Racing; Infrastructure; Public Sector Management; Commerce; Central Coast	John Kaye MLC
Attorney General; Planning; Police; Firearms; Corrective Services; Juvenile Justice; Lands; Local Government; Housing; Redfern Waterloo; Regional Development; State Development; Illawarra; Western NSW	David Shoebridge MLC

== Arrangement (53rd Parliament) ==
As of 1 December 2006, the parliamentary portfolios of the Greens NSW were arranged as such:

Role	Spokesperson
Treasury; Education; Industrial Relations; Justice; Public Works & Services; Mineral Resources; Gay and Lesbian Rights; Transport, Roads & Ports; Gaming & Racing; Women, Youth & Ageing; Electoral Issues; Information Technology; Parliamentary process	Lee Rhiannon MLC
Drug Law Reform; Energy; Tourism; Environment; Aboriginal Affairs; Natural Resources; Regional Development; Rural Affairs & Agriculture; Forestry; Emergency Services; Sport and Recreation; Fisheries; Arts	Ian Cohen MLC
Health; Local Government; Infrastructure & Planning; Western Sydney; Housing; Community & Disability Services; Arts; Small Business; Insurance; Training; Fair Trading; Multiculturalism & Ethnic Affairs	Sylvia Hale MLC
