= Frontbench of Richard Di Natale =

The Australian Greens frontbench consists of all Greens members of Parliament serving as the party's spokespeople inside Parliament on various issues, each member being assigned portfolios for their speaking duties. This allows the Greens to shadow government policies and actions from the party perspective.

== List ==
Spokesperson	Portfolio
Richard Di Natale (Leader)	Health; Multiculturalism; Sport; Foreign Affairs; International Aid and Development
Rachel Siewert (Party Whip)	Aboriginal & Torres Strait Islander Issues; Family, Ageing & Community Services; Mental Health
Adam Bandt (Co-Deputy Leader)	Climate Change; Employment & Workplace Relations; Energy; Science, Research & Innovation
Larissa Waters (Co-Deputy Leader)	Gambling; Women; Democracy; Mining and Resources; Tourism
Sarah Hanson-Young	Arts; Finance & Trade; Communications; Water & Murray Darling Basin; Environment and Biodiversity; Nuclear
Mehreen Faruqi	Animal Welfare; Education; Gun Control; Housing; Industry; Local Government
Peter Whish-Wilson	Consumer Affairs; Healthy Oceans; Treasury; Waste & Recycling; Defence and Veterans Affairs
Janet Rice	Agriculture & Rural Affairs; Forests; LGBTIQ; Transport & Infrastructure
Nick McKim	Attorney General; Immigration & Citizenship; Small Business
Jordon Steele-John	Disability Services; Digital Rights and I.T.; Youth; Sustainable Cities
