= Christine Milne =

Australian politician (born 1953)

Christine Milne AO

Leader of the Australian Greens
- In office 13 April 2012 – 6 May 2015
- Deputy: Adam Bandt
- Preceded by: Bob Brown
- Succeeded by: Richard Di Natale

Deputy Leader of the Australian Greens
- In office 10 November 2008 – 13 April 2012
- Leader: Bob Brown
- Preceded by: Position established
- Succeeded by: Adam Bandt

Leader of the Australian Greens in Tasmania
- In office 13 March 1993 – 29 August 1998
- Deputy: Peg Putt
- Preceded by: Bob Brown
- Succeeded by: Peg Putt

Deputy Leader of the Australian Greens in Tasmania
- In office 13 May 1992 – 13 March 1993
- Leader: Bob Brown
- Preceded by: Party established
- Succeeded by: Peg Putt

Senator for Tasmania
- In office 1 July 2005 – 10 August 2015
- Succeeded by: Nick McKim

Member of the Tasmanian Parliament for Lyons
- In office 13 May 1989 – 29 August 1998
- Preceded by: Chris Batt
- Succeeded by: Seat abolished

Personal details
- Born: Christine Anne Morris; 14 May 1953 (age 73) Latrobe, Tasmania, Australia
- Party: Greens (since 1989)
- Other political affiliations: Independent (until 1989)
- Spouse: Neville Milne (m. 1975; div. 1999)
- Children: 2
- Education: St Mary's College; Devonport High School
- Alma mater: University of Tasmania
- Occupation: School teacher (Department for Education, Children and Young People)
- Profession: Academic politician
- Website: christine-milne.greensmps.org.au

Christine Anne Milne AO (née Morris; born 14 May 1953) is an Australian politician who served as a Senator for Tasmania. She was the leader of the parliamentary caucus of the Australian Greens from 2012 to 2015. Milne stepped down as leader on 6 May 2015, replaced by Richard Di Natale.

== Early life and education ==
Milne was born in Latrobe, Tasmania, the second daughter of Wesley Vale dairy farmers Tom and June Morris. She attended Wesley Vale Area School from 1959 to 1963, St Mary's College, Hobart as a boarder from 1964 to 1969, and completed her final year of schooling at Devonport High School in 1970.

She studied history and political science at the University of Tasmania from 1971 to 1974, where she resided at Ena Waite University College and was elected its President. She graduated with a Bachelor of Arts degree with Honours in Australian History, and a Certificate of Education in March 1975.

From 1975 to 1984, Milne worked as a secondary school teacher, teaching English, History and Social Science at Parklands High School, Devonport High School and Don College. She first came to public attention for her role in opposing the building of the Wesley Vale pulp mill near Bass Strait in North Western Tasmania on the basis of its environmental impact. She also participated in the ultimately successful campaign opposing the Franklin Dam and was arrested and jailed in 1983. She worked as a research officer with the Australian Bicentennial Historical Records Search from 1987 to 1988.

== Political career ==
Milne was first elected to the Tasmanian House of Assembly in 1989 as a member of the Tasmanian Greens in the electorate of Lyons, one of five Green politicians elected at that election. She was part of the Labor–Green Accord, a political agreement between the Australian Labor Party (ALP) and the Tasmanian Greens to form government after the 1989 general election had resulted in a hung parliament. When Bob Brown stood down in 1993 to contest the federal election, she became leader of the Greens in the Tasmanian Parliament and the first female leader of a political party in Tasmania.

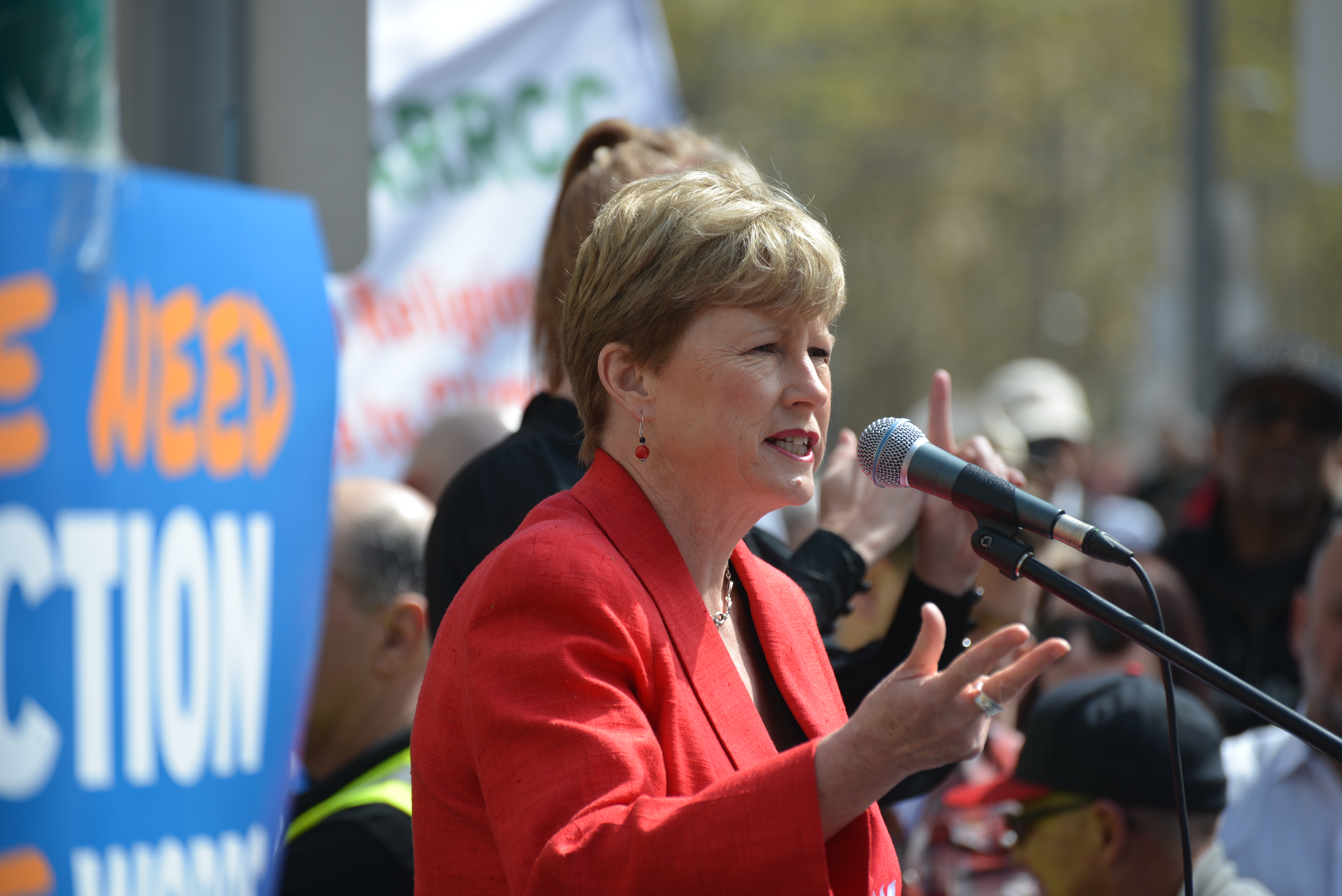
Christine Milne speaking at the Peoples Climate March in Melbourne in September 2014

She oversaw a loose alliance between the Greens and the Liberals after the 1996 general election. During the Rundle minority government, Tasmania saw significant economic and social reform. Measures included gun law reform, liberalisation of gay laws, an apology to the Indigenous stolen generations and support for an Australian republic.

In 1998, the major parties voted to restructure the House of Assembly from 35 to 25 seats, increasing the quota of votes required to be elected to the Tasmanian House of Assembly. Liberal Premier Tony Rundle immediately called an election, which his party subsequently lost. Due to the changes, Milne lost her seat, leaving the Greens with one remaining seat.

After her career in state politics, Milne was an adviser to Senator Brown from 2000 until she was elected to represent Tasmania in the Federal Senate at the 2004 federal election. Preferences to Family First from the Australian Labor Party almost prevented her from being elected; however, she managed to reach a quota mostly as a result of the high level of below-the-line voting in Tasmania. The other Green elected at that election was Rachel Siewert from Western Australia. Milne was part of Bob Brown's frontbench covering the portfolios of Arts, Climate change, Competition Policy & Small Business, Finance & Administration, Food Security, Regional Australia, Resources & Energy, and Trade.

Milne was Vice-President of the International Union for Conservation of Nature (IUCN, also known as the World Conservation Union) from 2005 to 2008. She became Deputy Leader of the Australian Greens on 10 November 2008.

In 2009, Milne debated the shortcomings of Australian Climate Change Regulatory Authority Bill 2009 in the federal parliament.

On 13 April 2012, Milne became the leader of the Australian Greens after the resignation of Brown. She reorganised the Greens front bench.

On 6 May 2015, Milne announced her immediate resignation from the leadership of the Australian Greens, and foreshadowed her departure from the Senate. Milne resigned from the Senate on 10 August 2015.

== Honours and recognition ==
Milne was appointed an Officer of the Order of Australia in the 2018 Queen's Birthday Honours. She was inducted onto the Tasmanian Honour Roll of Women in 2025.

Parliament of Australia
Elected at 2004 election	Senator for Tasmania; 2005–2015	Succeeded by Nick McKim
Party political offices
Preceded by Bob Brown	Federal Parliamentary Leader of the Australian Greens; 2012–2015	Succeeded by Richard Di Natale
New office	Deputy Federal Parliamentary Leader of the Australian Greens; 2008–2012	Succeeded by Adam Bandt
Parliament of Tasmania
Preceded by Chris Batt	Member for Lyons; 1989–1998	Lost seat at 1998 state election
Party political offices
Preceded by Bob Brown	Leader of the Tasmanian Greens; 1993–1998	Succeeded by Peg Putt
