= Dorinda Cox =

Australian politician (born 1976)

Senator Dorinda Cox
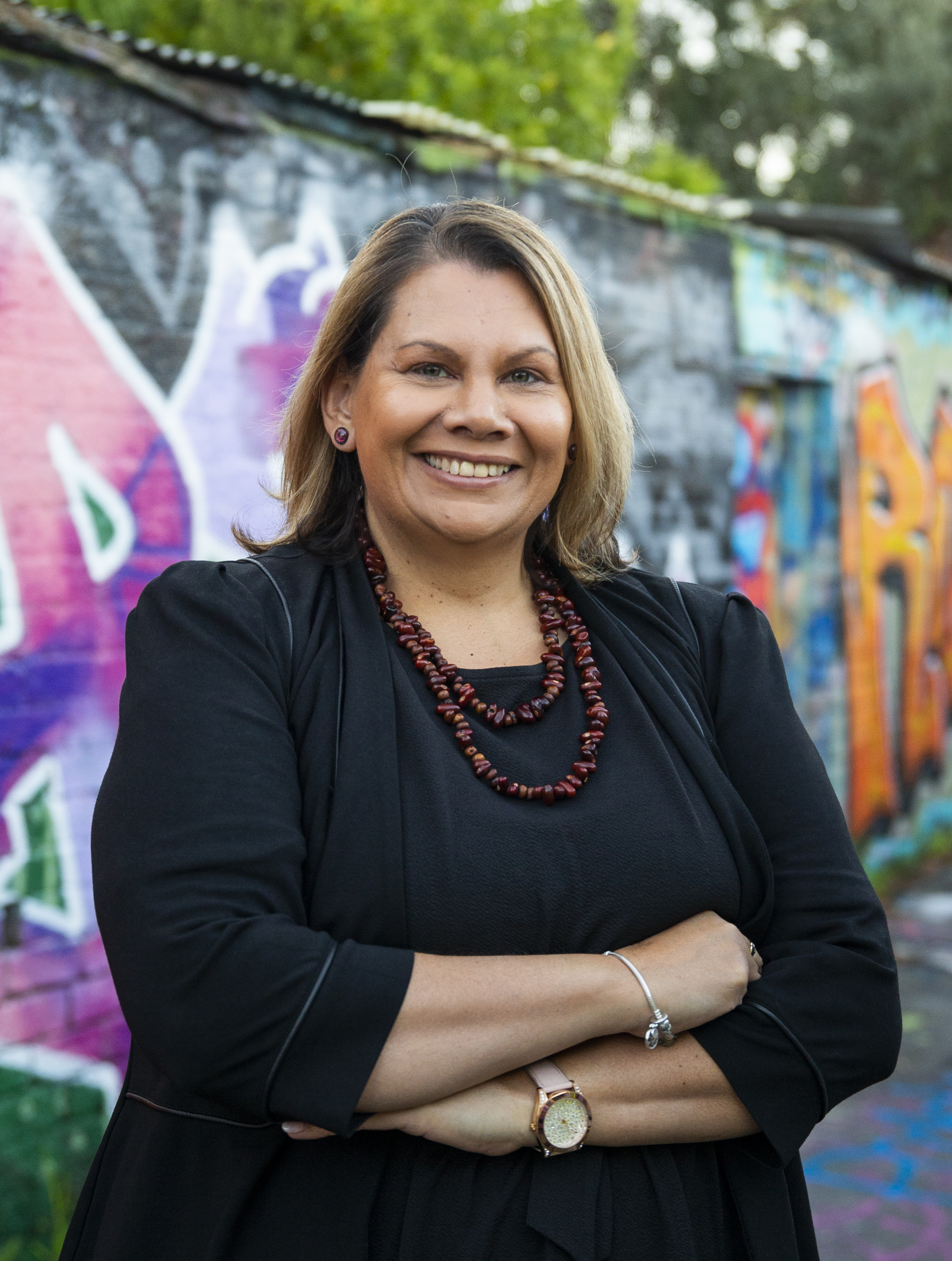
- Cox in 2022

Senator for Western Australia
- Incumbent
- Assumed office 14 September 2021
- Preceded by: Rachel Siewert

Personal details
- Born: 25 May 1976 (age 50) Kojonup, Western Australia, Australia
- Party: Labor (before 2017; since 2025); Greens (2017–2025)
- Children: 2
- Occupation: Police officer; Public servant; Activist

Dorinda Rose Cox (born 25 May 1976) is an Australian politician who has been a Senator for Western Australia since 2021. A Yamatji and Noongar woman, she is the first Indigenous woman to represent Western Australia in the Senate. She was originally appointed by the Australian Greens to fill the casual vacancy caused by the resignation of Senator Rachel Siewert in 2021, and was then elected as the Greens' lead Senate candidate in Western Australia at the 2022 federal election. She defected from the Greens to join the Labor Party in June 2025.

== Early life ==
Cox was born on 25 May 1976 in Kojonup, Western Australia. She is a member of the Yamatji and Noongar (Kaniyang and Yued) peoples. Her family has experienced "five generations of child removal in her matriarchal line". Her grandfather was taken from his family and country in the Gascoyne as an infant to be raised at the New Norcia mission, where his name was changed.

Cox grew up in Perth, leaving school in 1994 at the age of 17 to become a cadet with the Western Australia Police. Cox was a police cadet from 1994 to 1996 and an Aboriginal Police Liaison Officer from 1996 to 2002, where she conducted specialised training in child abuse, sexual assault interviewing and frontline policing, including the family violence unit. She left the force at the age of 27 to work for Centrelink. In 2008, Cox was appointed to the Kevin Rudd Government National Council to Reduce Violence Against Women. She has also served on the board of anti-violence organisation Our Watch, on the WA Ombudsman's Advisory Committee on Child Death Reviews and Family Violence Homicides, and on the Indigenous working group for the Every Woman Treaty campaign. Cox has produced extensive research outlining strategies for working closely with First Nations survivors of sexual assault. As of 2019, Cox was the acting executive officer of the Noongar Family Safety and Wellbeing Council. She is a former non-executive director of the Kooraminning Aboriginal Corporation based in Narrogin.

== Politics ==
=== Greens (2017–2025) ===
Cox stood for the Greens at the 2017 Western Australian state election in the seat of Jandakot. She was also the party's candidate at the 2018 Fremantle federal by-election.

In October 2020, Cox won preselection as the lead candidate on the Greens' Senate ticket in Western Australia at the 2022 federal election, following the decision of incumbent senator Rachel Siewert not to re-contest. Siewert chose to resign from the Senate prior to the end of her term, creating a casual vacancy to be filled by Cox in September 2021. She would be the first Indigenous woman to represent Western Australia in the Senate and the fifth in federal Parliament.

Cox was sworn in to the Senate on 18 October 2021. She took her maiden speech as an opportunity to shine a light on First Nations issues, including cultural heritage, rates of homelessness, deaths in custody, Treaty and family violence. In her first speech to the Senate, Cox also called for a national inquiry into missing and murdered First Nations women. In November 2021, Cox secured the support of the Senate to establish a parliamentary inquiry which will examine the policing processes used in First Nations murder and missing persons investigations. This committee became the Missing and Murdered First Nations Women and Children Committee as a part of the Legal and Constitutional Affairs References Committee.

Cox has served as the Greens' spokesperson across a number of portfolios. She replaced Lidia Thorpe as the party's spokesperson on First Nations in February 2023, following Thorpe's resignation from the Greens.

In October 2024, it was reported that Cox's office had a high staff turnover, with 20 staffers resigning over a three-year period, and that several staff members had lodged formal complaints with the Parliamentary Workplace Support Service and the office of then-Greens leader Adam Bandt. The complaints including accusations that Cox had engaged in bullying and created a hostile work environment. In response, a spokesman for Cox stated that "the number of staff that had left the senator’s office was not unusually high and said part of the reason for the turnover was her shift into the First Nations portfolio during the Voice to parliament referendum campaign". In response to the allegations, Cox was given a "provisional censure" by an executive committee of the WA Greens, which was subject to ratification by the party's state council and could lead to Cox's expulsion from the party. The national council of the Australian Greens subsequently passed a motion requesting the party's national secretaries to work with the WA Greens to establish "a fair, safe and legally robust process to resolve complaints". Cox's parliamentary colleagues reportedly opposed any moves by the organisational wing to expel Cox. In 2025, following Cox's departure from the Greens, Victorian senator Lidia Thorpe publicly announced that she had made a complaint against Cox in 2022 in which she alleged that she had been bullied by Cox, with the complaint unresolved after three years.

Cox unsuccessfully contested the deputy leadership of the Greens following the 2025 federal election, losing to Mehreen Faruqi. Cox also contested the position of party deputy whip, being defeated by Penny Allman-Payne.

=== Labor (2025–present) ===
On 2 June 2025, Cox left the Greens and joined the Labor Party. It was reported that Cox had made the decision due to worsening relations with the WA Greens branch, including the risk of losing her pre-selection for the next senate election. After joining Labor, Cox continued to deny historical bullying allegations relating to her time with the Greens. Cox also asserted that she had experienced racism and was bullied whilst a member of the Greens.

Soon after the decision to switch parties was made, The Sydney Morning Herald revealed that Cox was previously a member of the Labor party before she applied for Greens preselection to become a senator.

== Political positions ==
In 2020, Cox stated that her priorities if elected to the Senate would be to work for treaties with Indigenous Australians and to establish a national family violence strategy. Cox has also advocated for the use of Indigenous Australian customary law as a complement to the Australian legal system, as a way of improving criminal justice outcomes for Indigenous people. Following the 2021 Australian Parliament House sexual misconduct allegations, she stated that the women's rights movement in Australia suffered from a lack of diversity.

Cox pursued the Morrison government on its approval of the Scarborough gas project, a project that is expected to cause significant environmental harm, and generate 1.6 billion tonnes of emissions. In November 2021, Cox spoke out against the Morrison Government providing grants to frack the Beetaloo Basin. In 2022, Cox joined her Australian Greens colleagues in calling for a moratorium on all new coal and gas projects. Cox moved amendments on behalf of the Australian Greens to prohibit Export Finance Australia from investing in fossil fuel projects.

== Personal life ==
Cox has two daughters with her ex-husband.

Cox experiences some hearing difficulties and uses a cochlear implant. In 2022, she was named World Hearing Day Ambassador by the Ear Science Institute Australia.
