= Barbara Pocock =

Australian economist and politician

Senator Barbara Pocock AM
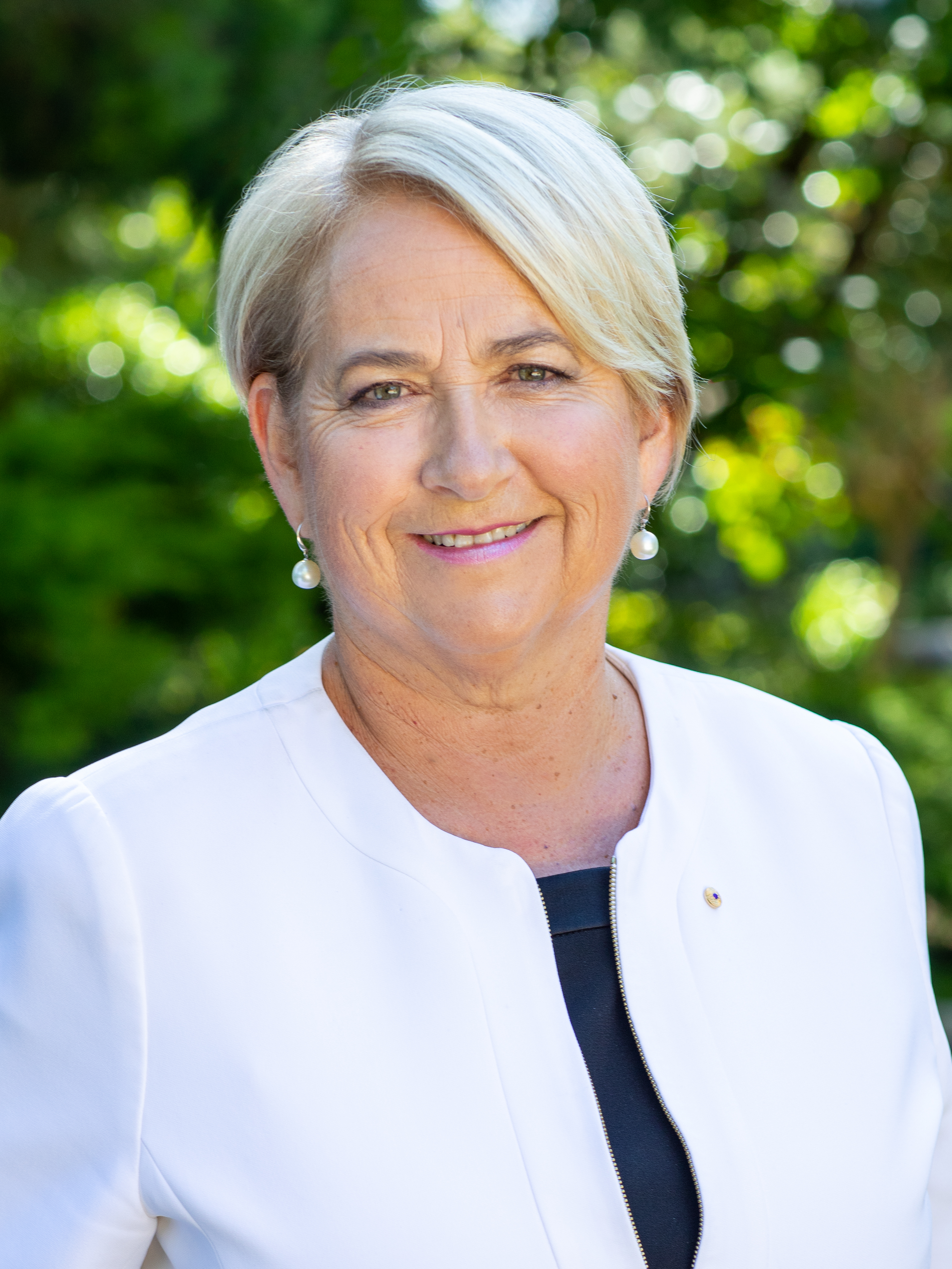
- Pocock in 2021

Senator for South Australia
- Incumbent
- Assumed office 1 July 2022

Personal details
- Born: Barbara Ann Pocock; 22 March 1955 (age 71) Berri, South Australia
- Party: Greens
- Domestic partner: Ian Campbell
- Children: 2
- Education: Wilderness School; Norwood High School
- Alma mater: University of Adelaide (BEcon Honours); University of Adelaide (PhD)
- Occupation: Politician
- Profession: Economist; Academic
- Website: greens.org.au/sa/person/barbara-pocock
- Barbara Pocock's voice Pocock speaking about her party's policies Recorded 29 April 2025

Barbara Ann Pocock AM (born 22 March 1955) is an Australian politician and economist. She is a member of the Australian Greens and has been a Senator for South Australia since 2022. She is an emeritus professor of the University of South Australia and was previously deputy chair of The Australia Institute from 2004 to 2022.

== Early life and education ==
Pocock was born on 22 March 1955 in Berri, South Australia. She grew up with her family on a mallee, sheep and wheat farm near Lameroo, 200 kilometres from the South Australian state capital of Adelaide.

Pocock moved to Adelaide in 1969 to attended Wilderness School as a boarding student before moving to Norwood International High School in 1972 to complete year 12. After finishing school, Pocock worked in shearing sheds and on farms in New Zealand for a year, and worked on farms in Australia.

She began studying economics in 1975 and graduated from the University of Adelaide in 1978 with a Bachelor of Economics (First Class Honours). She completed her PhD at the University of Adelaide in 1997 with a thesis titled "Analysis of male power in Australian unions, its effects and how to combat it."

== Professional career ==
Pocock was employed by the Reserve Bank of Australia from 1979 as a research officer in the International Department in which she would write briefing notes for the Governor. Her portfolio encompassed regions including Asia, Africa, and the Pacific. It was during this time at the Reserve Bank that Pocock first became more aware of poor working conditions and the need for unionism. She states that she realised the importance of the feminist movement in the workplace after seeing numerous women, including many migrants, working in the low paid part of the Reserve Bank counting money.

After her stint at the Reserve Bank, Pocock began work in 1981 at the Department of Industrial Relations in Newcastle and the Hunter Valley Region as an Equal Employment Opportunity Officer.

Pocock joined academia in 1989 when she was employed by the South Australian College of Advanced Education as a Lecturer. She was then promoted to a senior lecturer at the University of Adelaide in 1997, before being promoted once again to associate professor in 2002. After her time at the University of Adelaide she began work at the University of South Australia as a professor in 2006, before becoming an emeritus professor at the same institution in 2015. She established and led the Centre for Work and Life at UniSA from 2006 to 2014.

In 2010 Pocock was awarded a Member of the Order of Australia (AM) for services to industrial relations and social justice.

Pocock was a Director and Deputy Chair of the Australia Institute between 2004 and 2022.

== Politics ==
Pocock was a founding member of the New Left Party. She was a signatory of the Time to Act statement in March 1989 which led to the party's formation and subsequently served on its women's commission.

In December 2018, Pocock won Greens preselection to contest the federal seat of Adelaide. She increased the swing towards the party by six percentage points at the 2019 federal election, recording a primary vote of 16 percent.

=== Senate ===
Pocock was chosen as the Greens' lead Senate candidate in South Australia in September 2020. At the 2022 federal election she was elected to a six-year term beginning on 1 July 2022.

Following her election, Pocock became the Greens' spokesperson for finance, employment and the public sector. She was chair of the Senate select committee into work and care from 2022 to 2023. She played a leading role in the parliamentary hearings and public scrutiny following the PwC tax scandal in 2023.

=== Views and positions ===
Barbara Pocock speaking at a protest outside the Australian Taxation Office in Adelaide, June 2026

Pocock has long been a strong supporter of the feminist movement and the labour movement. As a researcher and academic she has written numerous books and academic journal articles on the labour market, work-life conflict, unionism, low pay, inequality and vocational education. She has focused her research on industrial relations, work and family, pay equity, and inequality in the workplace. Pocock is a strong believer in the importance of trade unions and advocated for equality through fair labour law. She has called for increased access to sick leave and holiday leave for casual workers and argued that the casual loading does not compensate for the loss of such conditions. She has also advocated against long working hours and fairer conditions for working carers, including parental leave and early childhood education and care. Pocock is a critic of the legislative restrictions on strikes and the outlawing of secondary boycotts.

Pocock has called for JobSeeker unemployment payments and all forms of income support to be increased to $88 a day, and an improvement in rental rights and the availability of public housing. When asked, as a professor of economics, if such Greens policies would crash the Australian economy she replied "No". She has pointed to the historically high levels of the profit share in Australia and the consequences for inequality of stalled wages and falling real incomes for workers.

Pocock is also a campaigner for urgent climate change action, LGBTQ+ rights, refugee rights, and anti-nuclear policies. Since 2015 she has been a member of 'Mothers for a Sustainable South Australia' (MOSSA), a campaign group of South Australian mothers who have opposed proposals for a high level nuclear waste dump in South Australia, and more recently the disposal of medium and low level waste in the state.

Pocock argues for free University, TAFE, and for the forgiveness of student debt due to the large economic burden placed upon university students. She points to the fact that she has had the advantages of living on a safe planet, enjoying free higher education, access to secure employment and the chance to buy a home through an affordable mortgage - all things unavailable to so many young Australians now." When launching the Greens' student debt policy with New South Wales Senator Mehreen Faruqi, Pocock further stressed the importance of free higher education arguing that "high levels of student debt stand in the way of secure housing for many young people."

=== Notification of intention to retire ===
On 25 August 2026, Pocock released a statement announcing her intention to not stand for preselection within the Greens political party for a second term. Pocock cited personal reasons for the decision while committing to "see out the remaining term". On 21 November 2026, the Greens announced that they had selected Isaac Astill to be their next Senate candidate.

== Published works ==
- Pocock, Barbara (1988). Demanding skill: women and technical education in Australia. Sydney, NSW: Allen & Unwin. ISBN 0043321372.
- Pocock, Barbara (1997). Strife: Sex and Politics in Labour Unions. Sydney, NSW: Allen & Unwin. ISBN 1864483121.
- Pocock, Barbara (2003). The Work/Life Collision; What Work is Doing to Australians and What to Do About it. Sydney, NSW: Federation Press. ISBN 9781862874756.
- Pocock, Barbara (2006). The Labour Market Ate My Babies: Work, Children and a Sustainable Future. Sydney, NSW: Federation Press. ISBN 1862876045.
- Hill, Elizabeth; Pocock, Barbara; Elliot, Alison (2007). Kids Count Better Early Childhood Education and Care in Australia. Sydney, NSW: Sydney University Press. ISBN 9781920898700.
- Masterman-Smith, Helen; Pocock, Barbara (2008). Living Low Paid: The dark side of prosperous Australia. Sydney, NSW: Allen & Unwin. ISBN 978-1741753967.
- Pocock, Barbara; Skinner, Natalie; Williams, Pip (2012). Work, rest and play in Australia today. Sydney, NSW: University of New South Wales Press. ISBN 978-1742232959.
