= Cate Faehrmann =

Australian politician

Cate Faehrmann MLC
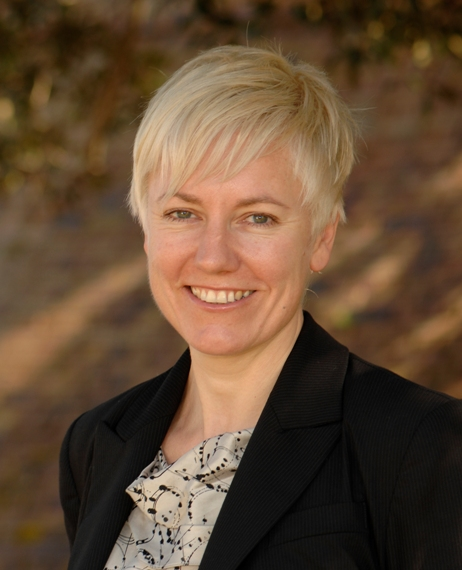

Member of the New South Wales Legislative Council
- Incumbent
- Assumed office 15 August 2018
- Preceded by: Mehreen Faruqi
- In office 7 September 2010 – 18 June 2013
- Preceded by: Lee Rhiannon
- Succeeded by: Mehreen Faruqi

Personal details
- Born: 17 March 1970 (age 56) Sydney, New South Wales, Australia
- Party: Greens
- Website: Official website

Cate Faehrmann (born 17 March 1970) is an Australian politician and environmental activist. Faehrmann was a Greens member of the New South Wales Legislative Council from 2011 to 2013. She resigned from the Legislative Council in June 2013 to stand for the Senate at the federal election of the same year, and was unsuccessful in obtaining a seat. She worked in the office of the Leader of the Australian Greens, Richard Di Natale, as his chief of staff from May 2015 to March 2018. In August 2018, she was re-elected to the Legislative Council to fill the casual vacancy caused by the resignation of Mehreen Faruqi, who had replaced Lee Rhiannon in the Australian Senate.

== Early life ==
Faehrmann was born in Darlinghurst, New South Wales, and spent her childhood in a small country town west of Brisbane. Her adoptive parents ran the local chemist, and she attended a Toowoomba boarding high school.

She attended Griffith University in Queensland, where she worked to establish a Women's Collective on campus, and was active in pro-choice campaigns at the time. She graduated with a Bachelor of Arts from La Trobe University.

In 2005, she was appointed executive director of the Nature Conservation Council of NSW. While heading up the Council, Faehrmann launched the Walk Against Warming initiative, an annual community call to action on tackling climate change, which drew crowds of tens of thousands in Sydney in other cities across Australia and the world.

In 2019, Faehrmann admitted to occasionally taking MDMA in her 20s at festivals and parties.

== Political career ==
Between 2001 and 2005, Faehrmann worked as a media advisor and campaign coordinator for the Greens party in South Australia, New South Wales and New Zealand.

She was preselected to fill the casual vacancy left by the resignation of Lee Rhiannon and took her place in the NSW Legislative Council in September 2010.

Following the 2011 state election, Faehrmann published a controversial opinion piece in the Sydney Morning Herald in which she was critical of the Greens' campaign strategy. She encouraged a period of internal reflection, writing: "The necessary soul searching is not just about the party's future fortunes. Climate change, the loss of native plants and animals, the need to foster healthy communities, the reduction of air and water pollution, and the creation of a sustainable economy, are urgent challenges. We must be a party of government within one generation. If we are to reach our potential within the next couple of elections, we need to be honest about our mistakes and learn from them. The party's handling of the boycott, divestment and sanctions policy against Israel was an unnecessary distraction from issues relevant to a state election."

As a member of the Legislative Council, Faehrmann's portfolio responsibilities within the Greens included: Environment, Transport, Healthy Lifestyles (incl. Dental Health, Drugs and Harm Minimisation), Roads and Ports, Status of Women, Sexuality and Gender Identity, Multiculturalism and Animal Welfare. As of May 2011 all NSW Greens MPs share portfolio responsibility for climate change.

Faehrmann was preselected in a statewide postal ballot of members to be the Greens lead Senate candidate for NSW in the 2013 federal election. For this reason, she resigned her seat from the NSW Parliament in June 2013, to prepare for the coming election. Faehrmann's vacated seat was filled by fellow Greens member, Mehreen Faruqi. Faehrmann failed to win a Senate seat.

In 2014, Faehrmann replaced Bob Brown as chairperson of Sea Shepherd Australia.

On 25 May 2015, she was announced as the Chief of Staff to newly-appointed Greens leader, Richard Di Natale, but left that post in March 2018, reportedly aiming to take the soon-to-be-vacant seat of Mehreen Faruqi in the NSW Legislative Council. She returned to the Council in August 2018.

In June 2020, Faehrmann pushed for the Principal Bicycle Network to be released publicly. She was commended by John Graham.

Cate Faehrmann is an advocate for the decriminalisation of drugs. In August, 2023, she called to legalise cocaine in Australia in response to Sydney's gang warfare and the murder of drug lord Alen Moradian. In 2024, she called the war on drugs an "epic failure", advocating for the decriminalisation of all drugs, citing the cost on taxpayers, continued drug use among people 16 and older, and reduction in harm related to decriminalisation.

Non-profit organization positions
Preceded by Bob Brown	Chairperson of Sea Shepherd Australia; 2014–2015	Succeeded by Peter Hammarstedt
