= Rachel Siewert =

Australian politician

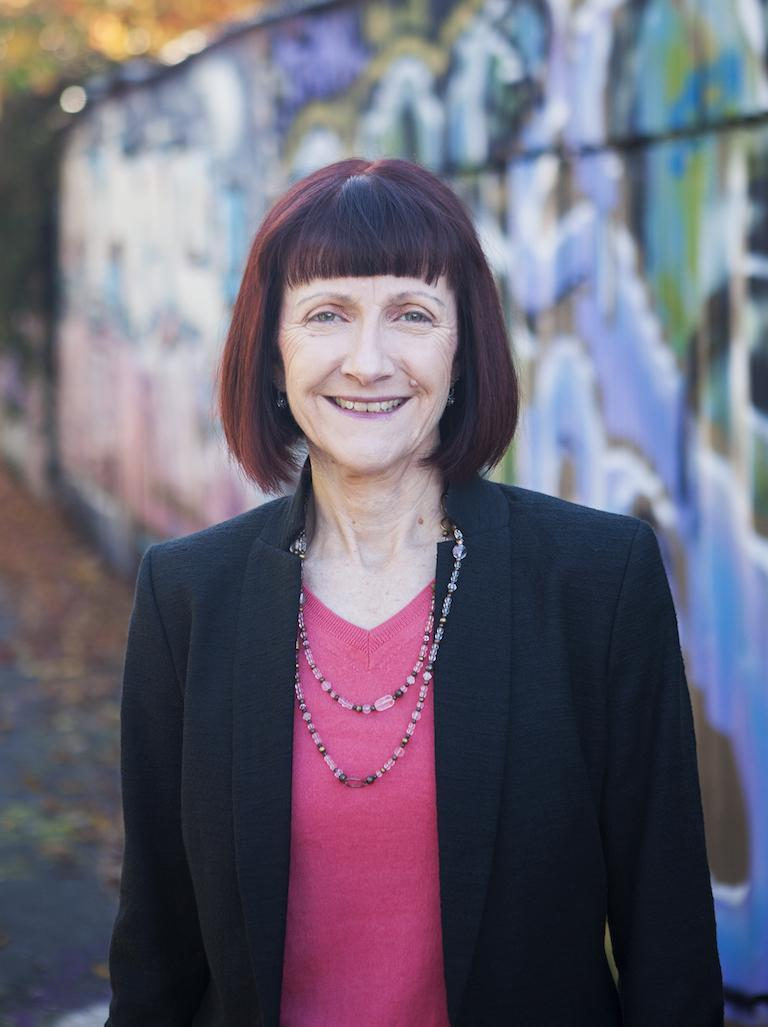

Co-Deputy Leader of the Australian Greens
- In office 21 July 2017 – 4 December 2018 Serving with Adam Bandt (Acting)
- Leader: Richard Di Natale
- Preceded by: Scott Ludlam and Larissa Waters
- Succeeded by: Larissa Waters

Senator for Western Australia
- In office 1 July 2005 – 6 September 2021
- Preceded by: Brian Greig
- Succeeded by: Dorinda Cox

Personal details
- Born: 4 November 1961 (age 64) Sydney, New South Wales, Australia
- Party: Australian Greens
- Occupation: Conservationist
- Website: Official website

Rachel Mary Siewert (born 4 November 1961) is an Australian politician. She was a senator for Western Australia from 2005 to 2021, representing the Australian Greens, and served as the party's co-deputy leader from 2017 to 2018. She previously worked as coordinator of the Conservation Council of Western Australia.

== Early life ==
Siewert was born in Sydney on 4 November 1961. Her family moved to Perth when she was 13. She completed a Bachelor of Science in agriculture at the University of Western Australia. At university she became involved in the anti-nuclear movement. She subsequently worked as a research officer with the state Department of Agriculture from 1984 to 1987, studying salinity and soil conservation in Jerramungup.

Siewert was the coordinator of the Conservation Council of Western Australia from 1987 to 2004, initially as the organisation's only paid staff member. In 2003 she was awarded the Bessie Rischbieth Conservation Award.

Siewert was co-convener of The Greens (WA) from 2002 to 2004.

== Political career ==
Siewert was first elected to the Senate at the 2004 federal election, to a term beginning on 1 July 2005. She was re-elected to a second term at the 2010 election. She was placed second on her party's Senate ticket in Western Australia at the 2016 election, which followed a double dissolution, and was originally elected to a three-year term. However, following Scott Ludlam's disqualification during the parliamentary eligibility crisis she was declared elected to his six-year term expiring in 2022.

Siewert was the Australian Greens Whip, chairs the Senate Community Affairs References Committee and was a member of the Expert Panel on Constitutional Recognition of Indigenous Australians. She served as co-deputy leader of the parliamentary Greens from November 2017 to December 2018, alongside Adam Bandt.

From 2020, Siewert acted as the Greens' spokeswoman for the portfolios of health; mental health; family, ageing and community services; and gambling.

Siewert has served on the "Inquiry into the destruction of 46,000 year old caves at the Juukan Gorge in the Pilbara region of Western Australia", which delivered its interim report in December 2020.

In July 2020, Siewert announced that she would not recontest her seat at the 2022 federal election. In August 2021, she announced she would resign from the Senate in September 2021, creating a casual vacancy. In September 2021, Siewert formally resigned from the Senate. A joint sitting of the Parliament of Western Australia appointed Dorinda Cox to fill the vacancy on 14 September 2021.

== Personal life ==
Siewert is divorced and has one son, and resides in Perth, Western Australia.

Party political offices
New title	Federal parliamentary whip of the Australian Greens; 2008–2021	Succeeded by Nick McKim
