= Mehreen Faruqi =

Australian politician (born 1963)

Senator Mehreen Faruqi
- Faruqi in 2025

Deputy Leader of the Australian Greens
- In office 10 June 2022 – 30 September 2026
- Leader: Adam Bandt; Larissa Waters
- Preceded by: Nick McKim and Larissa Waters
- Succeeded by: Steph Hodgins-May

Senator for New South Wales
- Incumbent
- Assumed office 15 August 2018
- Preceded by: Lee Rhiannon

Personal details
- Born: Mehreen Saeed Faruqi; 8 July 1963 (age 63) Lahore, Pakistan
- Citizenship: Australia (since 1994); Pakistan (until 2017)
- Party: Greens
- Education: University of Engineering and Technology, Lahore (BEng); University of New South Wales (MEngSc, PhD)
- Website: greens.org.au/nsw/person/mehreen-faruqi

Mehreen Saeed Faruqi (Urdu: مہرین سعید فاروقی; born 8 July 1963) is a Pakistani-born Australian politician and former engineer who has served as a federal Senator for New South Wales since 15 August 2018, representing the Greens. She was chosen to fill a casual vacancy caused by the resignation of Lee Rhiannon, before being elected in her own right in 2019. She had previously served in the New South Wales Legislative Council between June 2013 and August 2018. Faruqi served as Deputy Leader of the Australian Greens from June 2022 to September 2026.

== Early life and education ==
Mehreen Saeed Faruqi was born on 8 July 1963 in Lahore, Pakistan. Her father, a civil engineer, was a professor at the University of Engineering and Technology (UET) in Lahore and she grew up on the UET campus. In 1988, she gained a BEng (civil) from UET. She became a structural engineer. Her older brothers, younger sister, husband, and father-in-law are also civil engineers. Faruqi had an arranged marriage with husband Omar whom she first met at work.

She moved to Sydney, Australia, in 1992 as a skilled economic migrant, where she began attending the University of New South Wales (UNSW); her father had previously studied there under the Colombo Plan in the 1950s. She completed a Master of Engineering Science degree in 1994 She earned a doctorate in environmental engineering in 2000, with her doctoral thesis titled "Intensification of anaerobic lagoons for abattoir wastewater treatment and biogas recovery".

== Career ==
=== Engineering career ===
Before her appointment to the Legislative Council, Faruqi had a 25-year career as a professional engineer and academic. She worked in positions in local government, consulting firms and higher education institutions in Australia and internationally. These included roles such as Manager of Environment and Services at Mosman Council, Manager of Natural Resources and Catchments for Port Macquarie-Hastings Council, and as the Director of the Institute of Environmental Studies at UNSW.

At the time she was appointed to the New South Wales parliament, she was Academic Director of the Master of Business and Technology Program and an associate professor at the Australian Graduate School of Management for UNSW.

=== State politics ===
Faruqi joined the Greens in 2004 in Port Macquarie and ran as a candidate for the Legislative Assembly seat of Heffron in 2011 and at the 2012 by-election. She was chosen to replace Cate Faehrmann in the Legislative Council in 2013, becoming the first Muslim woman to be a member of an Australian parliament. Her term in the council began on 19 June 2013.

In parliament, Faruqi held several portfolios for The Greens NSW: Animal Welfare, Drugs and Harm Minimisation, Environment, Lower Mid North Coast, Multiculturalism, Roads & Ports, Status of Women, Transport, Western Sydney, and Young People.

Faruqi is a vocal pro-choice advocate, introducing the first parliamentary bill to decriminalise abortion in New South Wales in June 2014. Faruqi is also an advocate for public transport and environmental sustainability. In March 2014, she successfully moved a motion in parliament ordering the release of all government documents relating to the creation of the business case for the WestConnex motorway. This uncovered evidence of the NSW government's plan for mass outsourcing of public service work and uncertainty among WestConnex staff and advisers on the viability of the project.

In February 2018, Faruqi attempted to block the Christian Friends of Israeli Communities from hosting an event at the Parliament of New South Wales, as they fund illegal Israel settlements in the West Bank.

Faruqi resigned her position in the parliament after giving her farewell speech on 14 August 2018.

=== Federal politics ===
On 25 November 2017, Faruqi defeated incumbent New South Wales Greens Senator Lee Rhiannon in a pre-selection contest for the first spot on the NSW Greens Senate ballot at the 2019 federal election. Rhiannon resigned her Senate position on 15 August 2018 and on the same day Faruqi was appointed to fill the vacant seat by a joint sitting of the New South Wales Parliament. She was sworn in on 20 August 2018, becoming the first female Muslim senator in Australian history.

Faruqi was re-elected in the 2019 federal election, securing 8.7% of the state's vote, with a swing of 1.32 points in her favour.

Faruqi has been a prominent critic of section 44(i) of the Australian Constitution, which requires federal parliamentary candidates to renounce any foreign citizenship. She has spoken about the emotional difficulty of giving up her Pakistani citizenship to stand for Parliament, describing it as "severing off connections from my history," and has argued that such requirements restrict diversity in Australian politics.

In Parliament, Faruqi has been a noted critic of horse racing and greyhound racing in Australia. In 2021, Faruqi released a Horse Racing Transition Plan on Twitter, and in 2023 proposed repurposing 'racetracks for green spaces and community facilities'. Faruqi has been widely criticised by figures within the racing industry for her opposition to horse and greyhound racing.

Following the 2022 federal election, Faruqi was elected as the Deputy Leader of the Australian Greens.

Avatar of Pauline Hanson

Pauline Hanson
Twitter
@PaulineHansonOz

Your attitude appalls and disgusts me. When you immigrated to Australia you took every advantage of this country. You took citizenship, bought multiple homes, and a job in a parliament. It's clear you're not happy, so pack your bags and piss off back to Pakistan. -PH

9 September 2022

Avatar of Mehreen Faruqi

Mehreen Faruqi
Twitter
@MehreenFaruqi

Condolences to those who knew the Queen.

I cannot mourn the leader of a racist empire built on stolen lives, land and wealth of colonised peoples.

We are reminded of the urgency of Treaty with First Nations, justice & reparations for British colonies & becoming a republic.

9 September 2022

Following the death of Elizabeth II, Faruqi stated "I cannot mourn the leader of a racist empire built on stolen lives, land and wealth of colonised peoples" as she called for a republic. Faruqi was subject to racial abuse over the comments. On 9 September 2022, Pauline Hanson tweeted that Faruqi should "piss off back to Pakistan". Subsequently, Faruqi decided to launch court proceedings against Hanson for "breaching section 18C of the Racial Discrimination Act 1975". On 1 November 2024 it was reported that Federal Court of Australia judge Angus Stewart had ruled that Hanson's tweet was an "angry personal attack", unconnected with the issues Faruqi raised, and was therefore "anti-Muslim or Islamophobic". Hanson was ordered to delete the tweet and pay costs for the entire proceedings. Hanson said that she would appeal the decision. On 27 July 2026, Hanson's appeal was rejected by the Federal Court.

On 9 October 2023, Faruqi criticised the decision to illuminate Parliament House in the colours of the Israeli flag (blue and white) to show solidarity with the people of Israel in the wake of the 2023 Hamas-led attack on Israel. Faruqi wrote on Twitter 'One colonial government supporting another. What a disgrace. #FreePalestine'. In response, Prime Minister Anthony Albanese accused Faruqi of 'trying to play politics with this issue'. The Australian Jewish News also expressed their disappointment with Faruqi's comments, which were made two days after the initial 7 October attack. Faruqi, referring to the Israeli blockade of Gaza, said "Throwing bombs of white phosphorus is not defending yourself, denying 2.3 million people of food, water, electricity, fuel is not defending yourself." Senator Jordon Steele-John echoed her statements, saying that "It is a complete siege, a textbook definition of collective punishment" and criticised the government failure to condemn Israeli "crime against humanity."

Subsequently, on Monday 6 November 2023, Faruqi led her Greens colleagues in a Senate walkout, protesting the Albanese government's refusal to call for a ceasefire to the Gaza war. Faruqi described the Albanese government as "gutless, heartless, cowards." She stated that "You are watching the massacre of thousands of Palestinians by Israel, and you are not condemning Israel, you refuse to call for an immediate ceasefire," to which Labor Senator Don Farrell responded that Faruqi and her colleagues were 'making hay' out of the tragic situation. Faruqi later stated it was "disgraceful" and "despicable" of Farrell to frame the Greens' calls for a ceasefire as a "political play".

Faruqi was re-elected as Deputy Greens Leader following the 2025 Australian federal election, under new party leader Larissa Waters. In July 2025, Faruqi held a sign which called for sanctions on Israel and referred to the humanitarian situation in Gaza at the opening of parliament, while she asked Prime minister Albanese to sanction Israel. The Senate later sanctioned her protest and banned Faruqi from partaking in any parliamentary overseas delegations during the 48th parliament. In August 2025, Faruqi attended and spoke at the March for Humanity in Sydney, a large protest highlighting the plight of Palestinians in the Gaza conflict.

During her speech at the 2025 Australian Greens National Conference, she claimed that Greens should embrace and proudly present itself as a eco-socialist party.

Following the December 2025 terror attack at Bondi Beach, Greens senator Mehreen Faruqi attended a public vigil at Bondi Pavilion to lay flowers and pay respects to the victims. Several media outlets reported that her attendance prompted confrontations from some members of the public, with television footage showing heckling and questioning directed at her regarding previous political statements. Coverage noted that the incidents occurred amid heightened emotions at the vigil, where grief and anger were also directed at other political figures in attendance. The Australian Greens said their representatives attended the vigil to mourn the victims and condemn the attack, while broader reporting characterised the event overall as one of communal mourning and calls for unity against violence.

Faruqi contested the Greens leadership election on 30 September 2026, running a joint ticket with Nick McKim. She ran against fellow candidates David Shoebridge and Sarah Hanson-Young. Faruqi lost the vote 7—4 to Shoebridge, and was replaced as Deputy Leader of the Greens by Steph Hodgins-May. Following the leadership election, Faruqi called for Shoebridge to allow party members to vote in future leadership elections.

== Personal life ==
Faruqi moved to Port Macquarie in 2001, but moved back to Sydney in 2006. She and her husband have two children together, including Osman Faruqi, a political journalist.

As of 2026, Faruqi owned two properties, her primary residence, and an investment property, both in NSW.

Faruqi was one of three MPs in the 46th Parliament of Australia who graduated from high school outside Australia, and one of eleven MPs who possessed a PhD.

== Key published works ==
- Harding, R, Hendriks, CM, and Faruqi, M. (2009). Environmental Decision-Making - Exploring complexity and context, Federation Press, Sydney. ISBN 9781862877481
- Faruqi, M. (2012). 'Embracing Complexity To Enable Change', in: D. Rigling Gallagher; N. Christiansen and P. Andrews; eds, Environmental Leadership: A Reference Handbook, Vol. 2, pp. 772–781, Sage, Thousand Oaks, California. ISBN 9781412981514
- Faruqi, Mehreen (2021). Too Migrant, Too Muslim, Too Loud. Crows Nest, NSW: Allen & Unwin. ISBN 978-1-76087-818-4.

== Awards ==
- Judy Raper Award for Leadership in Engineering, UNSW School of Chemical Engineering (2013).
- Edna Ryan Grand Stirrer Award (2017) for her tireless work on the Abortion Law Reform campaign, for "inciting others to challenge the status quo"
- Tamgha-e-Quaid-e-Azam awarded by the President of Pakistan in 2023.
