= Richard Di Natale =

Australian former politician (born 1970)

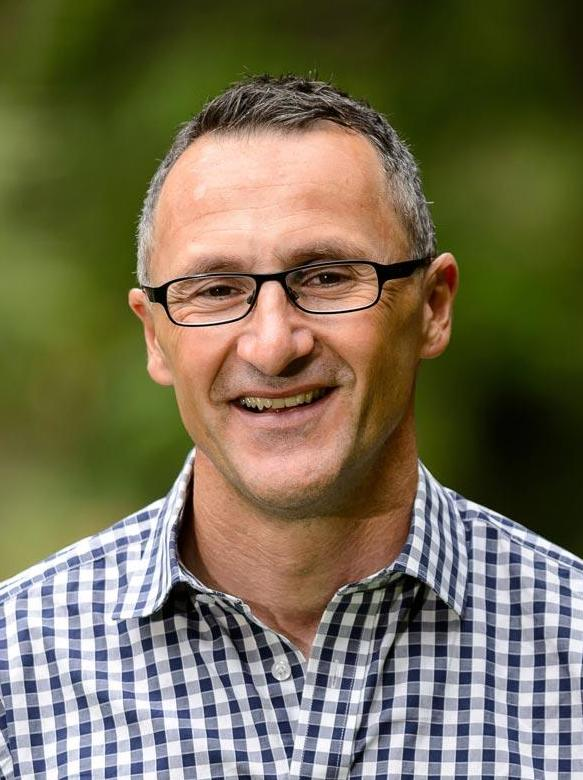
- Di Natale in 2019

Leader of the Australian Greens
- In office 6 May 2015 – 3 February 2020
- Deputy: Scott Ludlam; Larissa Waters; Adam Bandt
- Preceded by: Christine Milne
- Succeeded by: Adam Bandt

Senator for Victoria
- In office 1 July 2011 – 26 August 2020
- Succeeded by: Lidia Thorpe

Personal details
- Born: Richard Luigi Di Natale; 6 June 1970 (age 56) Melbourne, Victoria, Australia
- Party: Greens (since 2000)
- Spouse: Lucy Quarterman (m. 2007)
- Education: Parade College; Monash University; La Trobe University
- Profession: Politician, public health physician
- Website: richard-di-natale.greensmps.org.au

Richard Luigi Di Natale (Italian pronunciation: [di naˈta.le]; born 6 June 1970) is an Australian former politician who was a Senator for Victoria. He was also the leader of the Australian Greens from 2015 to 2020. Di Natale was elected to the Senate in the 2010 federal election. A former general practitioner, Di Natale became federal parliamentary leader of the Australian Greens on 6 May 2015 following the resignation of Christine Milne. He was the leader of the Greens during the 2016 and 2019 federal elections.

== Early life ==
Di Natale was born in Melbourne to Italian immigrants. His mother was born in San Marco in Lamis, Apulia, while his father was born in Syracuse, Sicily. Di Natale attended Parade College, graduating in 1987, and Monash University, where he graduated with a Bachelor of Medicine, Bachelor of Surgery degree in 1993. He later obtained Master of Public Health and Master of Health Science degrees from La Trobe University.

Prior to entering parliament, Di Natale was a general practitioner and public health specialist. He worked in Aboriginal health in the Northern Territory, on HIV prevention in India and in the drug and alcohol sector.

== Political career ==
Di Natale joined the Victorian Greens in 2000. He was as a Greens Senate candidate in 2004.

Di Natale also ran for the position of Lord Mayor of Melbourne in 2004, coming second to the elected John So.

In both 2002 and 2006, Di Natale was narrowly defeated in the seat of Melbourne in the Victorian Legislative Assembly, almost unseating ALP health minister Bronwyn Pike. He received 48% of the two-party preferred vote in both elections. Di Natale acted as health spokesperson for the Greens in Victoria and in 2002 spoke about the Greens' support for harm reduction policies to manage illicit drug use.

In April 2007, Di Natale spoke out about the health implications of climate change, and later that year voiced concerns about terror laws in relation to the then suspect Muhamed Haneef.

Di Natale was nominated as the Australian Greens' lead senate candidate for Victoria for the 2010 federal election. Greens leader Senator Bob Brown labelled Di Natale as the Greens' "next strongest hope" at this election.

At the 2010 election, Di Natale won a Senate seat representing Victoria. His term began on 1 July 2011. Upon taking up his seat in the Senate, Di Natale became the Greens' federal spokesperson for health. His other portfolios include sport and multiculturalism.

Di Natale was elected unopposed as parliamentary leader of the Greens party room on 6 May 2015 following the resignation of Christine Milne from the position.

The Greens achieved mixed results at the 2016 federal election. The Party targeted several House of Representatives seats, but did not win any additional seats despite achieving large swings. The party also lost a senator. Di Natale argued that the Greens' election strategy had been successful, with voters now seeing them as a major party.

Di Natale has written in favour of legalising cannabis and against the war on drugs, as well as his support for a universal basic income.

== Parliamentary career ==
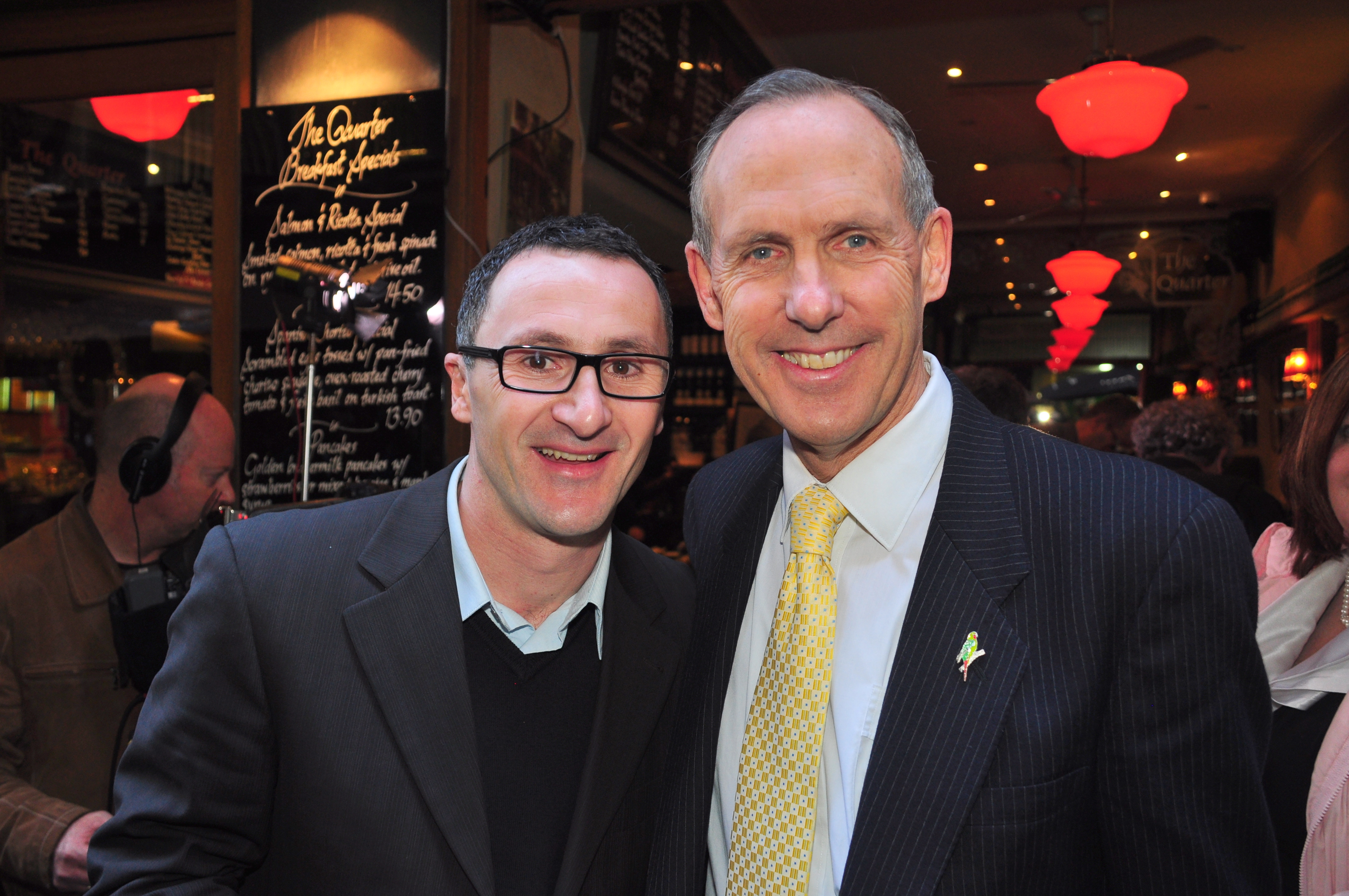
Di Natale with Senator Bob Brown in Melbourne during the 2010 federal election campaign

At the 2010 federal election, the Australian Greens achieved a shared balance of power in the House of Representatives and the sole balance of power in the Senate. In the Senate, they were in a shared balance of power position after the 2007 federal election and the 2013 federal election.

Di Natale secured almost $5 billion towards Medicare-funded dentistry, which he described as "laying the foundations for Denticare" – the Greens' policy of universally available Medicare-funded dentistry.

Di Natale campaigned against the Future Fund's holdings in tobacco funds, a campaign that was ultimately successful with the Fund divesting the entirety of its tobacco holdings (approximately AUD $250 million) in 2012.

Di Natale also helped establish Senate inquiries into a number of issues of public significance including budget cuts, medicinal cannabis, the emergence of "superbugs", hospital funding, air pollution, pharmaceutical transparency, sports science and gambling reform. Di Natale conducts ongoing campaigns for improved human rights in Indonesia's West Papua, timely access to cost-effective drugs through Australia's Pharmaceutical Benefits Scheme, and science-based public health policies in areas such as wind farms and vaccination policy.

Di Natale was the Chair of the Senate Select Committee into the Abbott government 2014 federal budget budget cuts and Deputy Chair of the Senate Select Committee into health. He is the co-convener of the Parliamentary Friends for Drug Policy and Law Reform, the Parliamentary Friends of West Papua and the Parliamentary Friends of Medicine.

On 3 February 2020, Di Natale resigned as leader of the Greens and announced his intention to resign from the Senate, citing family responsibilities. Adam Bandt was elected unopposed to replace Di Natale for the leadership role. Lidia Thorpe was selected by Greens members to fill the Senate vacancy caused by Di Natale's resignation. Di Natale resigned from the Senate on 26 August 2020.

== Political views ==
Di Natale supports legalising recreational cannabis usage, and has admitted to having smoked marijuana before. Di Natale also supports a universal basic income.

== Personal life ==
Di Natale, his wife and two sons live on a hobby farm in the foothills of Victoria's Otway Ranges. His sister, Deborah, is married to former Victorian Greens leader Greg Barber and was a City of Yarra councillor from 2002 until 2004.

Growing up in Melbourne, Di Natale played Australian rules football for the Coburg and Oakleigh Football Clubs in the Victorian Football Association and is a long time Richmond Tigers fan.

Party political offices
Preceded by Christine Milne	Federal Parliamentary Leader of the Australian Greens; 2015–2020	Succeeded by Adam Bandt
