= Australian Greens leadership elections =

Political party organisation information

The Australian Greens held a number of leadership elections and deputy leadership elections. The most recent was held in 2025.

The Greens leadership is elected by a Caucus vote for all members of the party sitting in Parliament, All Green leaders have been elected unopposed.

In May 2020, 62% of rank-and-file Greens party members voted for democratically Leadership election, However it failed to meet the two-thirds majority of 66.67% which is required to force a change.

== 2005 election ==
2005 Australian Greens leadership election
- 29 November 2005
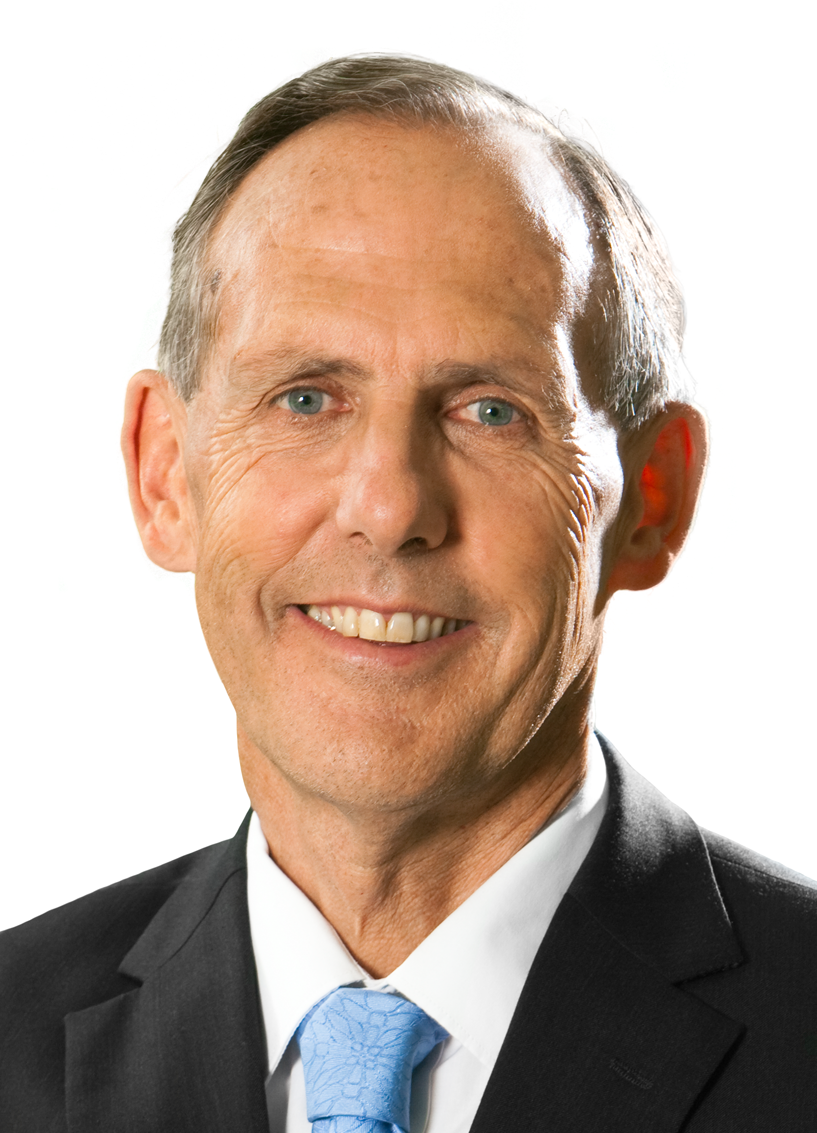
Candidate	Bob Brown
Caucus vote	Unopposed
Seat	Senator for TAS
Leader before election
No leader
Elected Leader
Bob Brown

The Greens had their first leadership election on 29 November 2005; prior to this they did not have a party leader, preferring a consultative model of government.

At a party conference in Hobart, the Greens announced their intention to formalise their party's structure in anticipation of a growing presence in Federal Parliament.

Tasmanian Senator Bob Brown was elected leader unopposed, with Western Australian Senator Rachel Siewert appointed the party's first Whip.

== 2008 deputy election ==
2008 Australian Greens deputy leadership election
- 29 November 2005
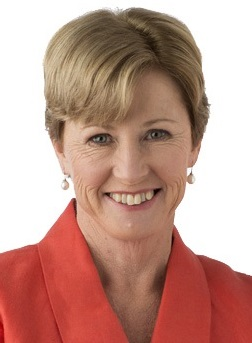
Candidate	Christine Milne
Caucus vote	Won
Seat	Senator for TAS
Deputy leader before election
No leader
Elected Deputy leader
Christine Milne

The 2008 Australian Greens deputy leadership election was held on 10 November 2008.

Tasmanian senator Christine Milne was elected to the position, becoming the first federal Greens deputy leader.

== 2010 deputy spill ==
2010 Australian Greens deputy leadership spill
- September 2010
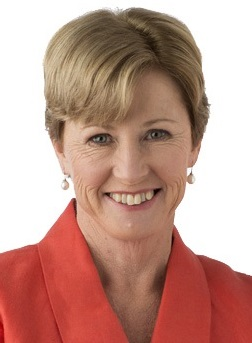

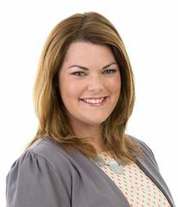
Candidate	Christine Milne	Sarah Hanson-Young
Caucus vote	Won	Defeated
Seat	Senator for TAS	Senator for SA
Deputy Leader before election
Christine Milne
Elected Deputy Leader
Christine Milne

The Greens had a deputy leadership spill in 2010 following the 2010 Australian federal election.

The role was contested by Senator for Tasmania Christine Milne and Senator for South Australia Sarah Hanson-Young. Hanson-Young was critical of the Greens supporting the minority Labor Gillard government, and wanted the party to negotiate with the Liberal Party, while Milne wished to critically maintain the agreement.

The election was won by Christine Milne.

== 2012 election ==
2012 Australian Greens leadership election
- 13 April 2012
- Leadership election
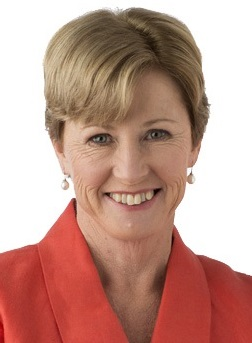
Candidate	Christine Milne
Caucus vote	Unopposed
Seat	Senator for TAS
Leader before election
Bob Brown
Elected Leader
Christine Milne
- Deputy leadership election
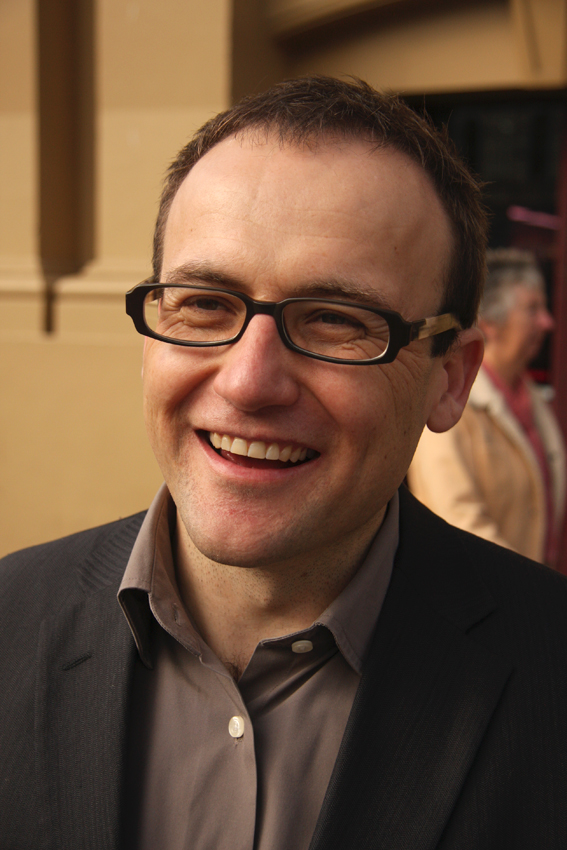

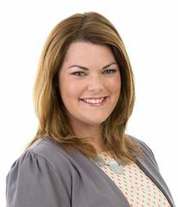
Candidate	Adam Bandt	Sarah Hanson-Young
Caucus vote	Won	Defeated
Seat	Melbourne (Vic.)	Senator for SA
Deputy Leader before election
Christine Milne
Elected Deputy Leader
Adam Bandt

Brown served as party leader until 13 April 2012, when he announced his retirement from politics.

The Greens parliamentary party room was immediately convened to appoint a new leader and deputy leader. Christine Milne, Senator from Tasmania, was elected unopposed to the leadership.

The deputy leader seat was contested between Adam Bandt, the member for Melbourne in the House of Representatives, and Sarah Hanson-Young. Bandt became the second Greens MP to be elected to the position of deputy leader of the party, Milne having previously filled the role after its establishment in 2008.

The leadership election had no effect on the deal that existed between the governing Gillard Labor Government and the Greens, to which Milne remained a signatory.

== 2015 election ==
2015 Australian Greens leadership election
- 6 May 2015
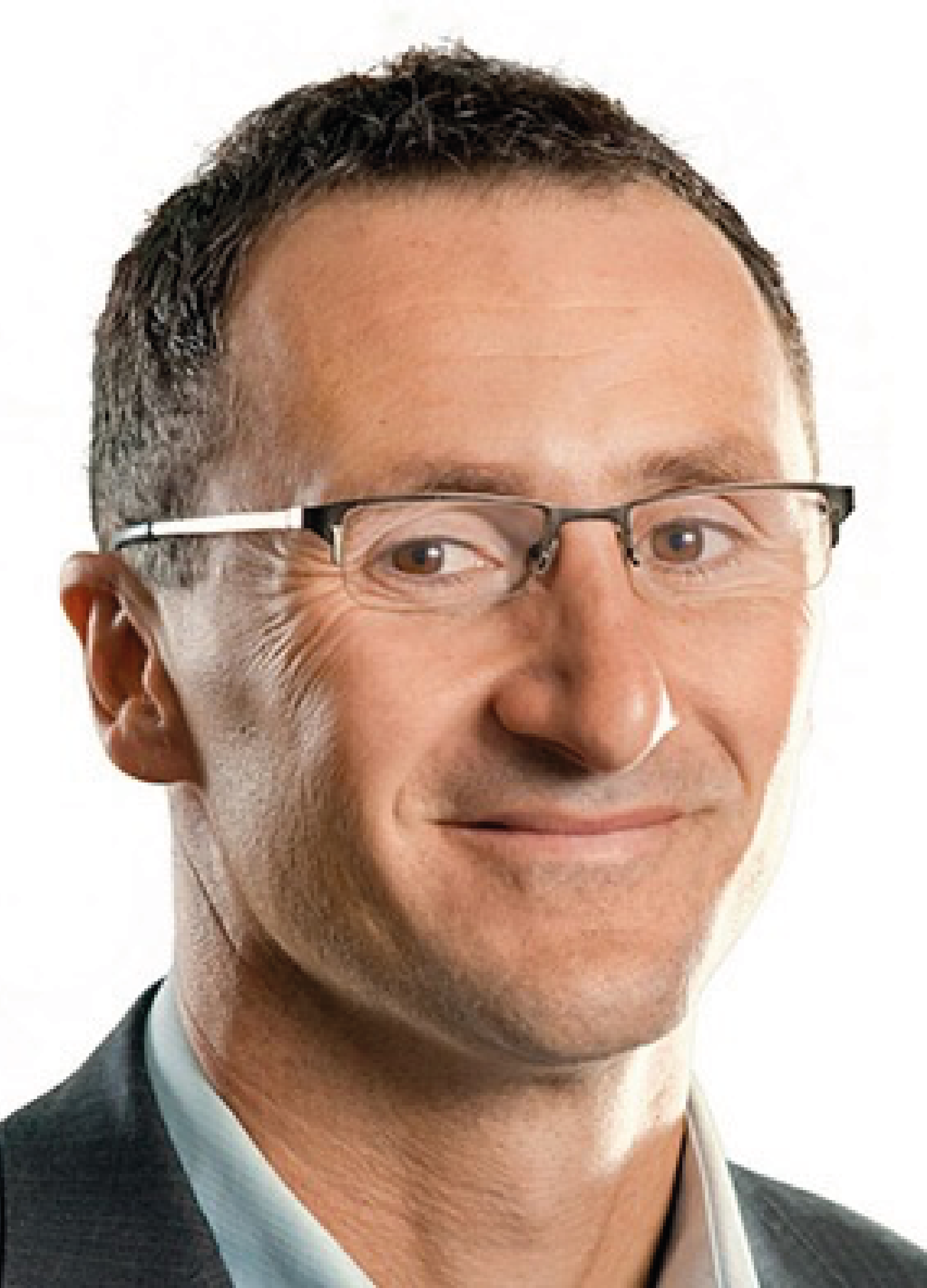
Candidate	Richard Di Natale
Caucus vote	Unopposed
Seat	Senator for VIC
Leader before election
Christine Milne
Elected Leader
Richard Di Natale

On the morning of 6 May 2015, Christine Milne announced on Twitter her resignation from the position of leader of the Greens, prompting a meeting of the Greens' parliamentary party room to fill her replacement.

Shortly after her announcement, Victorian senator Richard Di Natale revealed he would stand as a candidate for the leadership, whilst the media speculated incumbent deputy leader Adam Bandt would seek re-election to the position.

At the party room meeting however, Bandt did not seek re-election to the deputy leadership, later saying he was "happy" to hand over the role and instead focus on the birth of his partner's baby. Consequently, the party decided to elect two senators as co-deputy leaders; Scott Ludlam and Larissa Waters.

Di Natale was elected to the leadership unopposed and he became the first leader of the Australian Greens to represent a state other than Tasmania.

== 2020 election ==
2020 Australian Greens leadership election
- 4 February 2020
- Leadership election
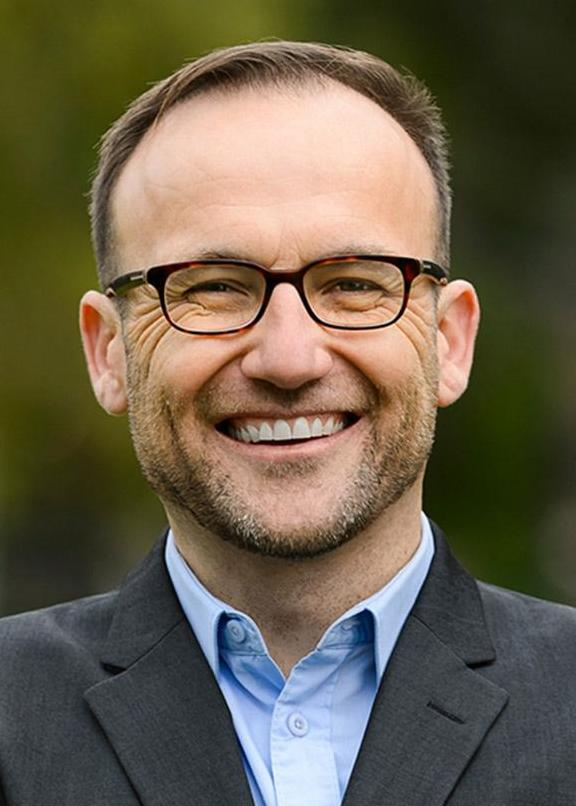
Candidate	Adam Bandt
Caucus vote	Unopposed
Seat	Melbourne (Vic)
Leader before election
Richard Di Natale
Elected Leader
Adam Bandt
- Senate and first co-deputy leadership election
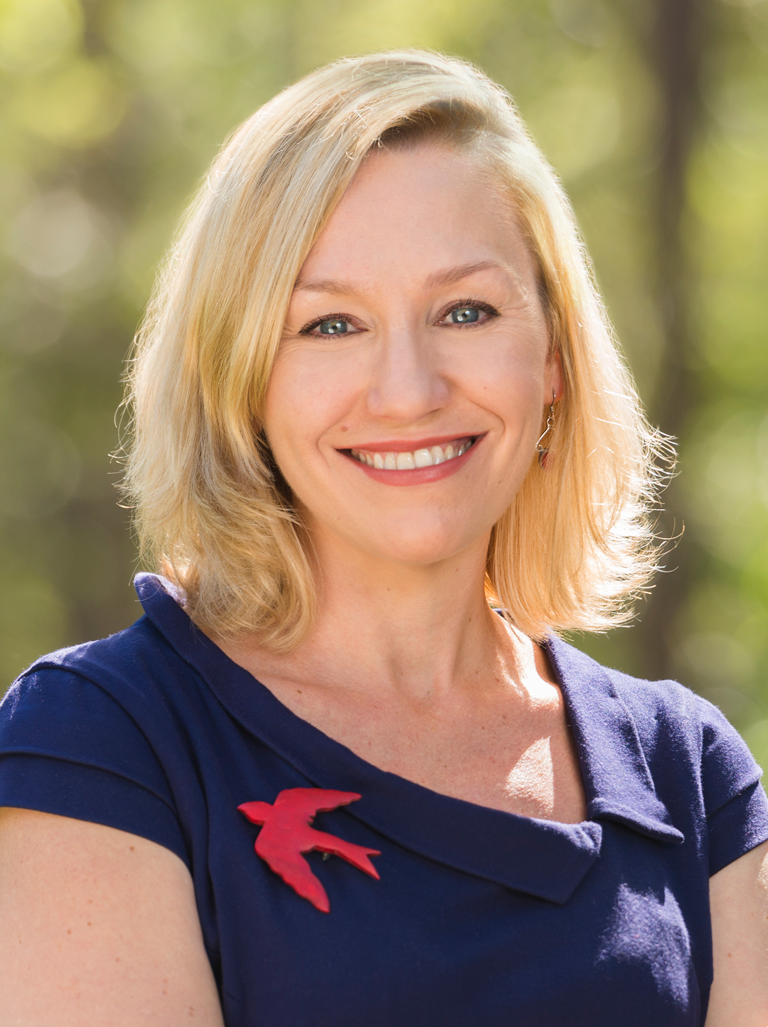
Candidate	Larissa Waters
Caucus vote	Unopposed
Seat	Senator for Qld
- Second co-deputy leadership election
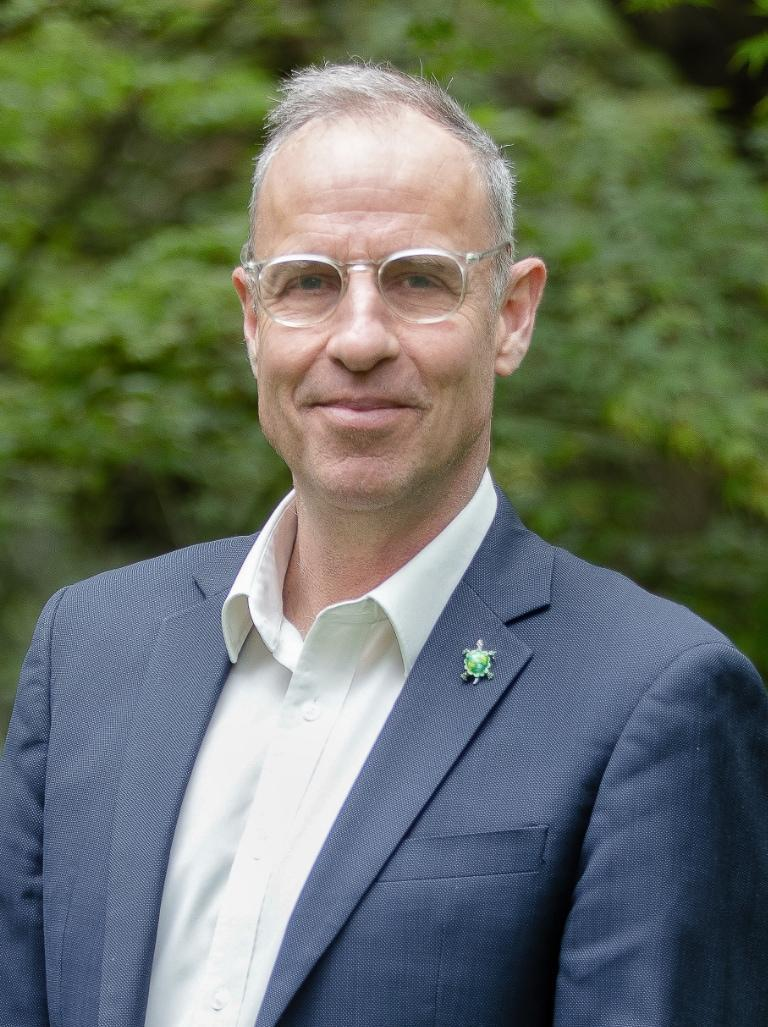

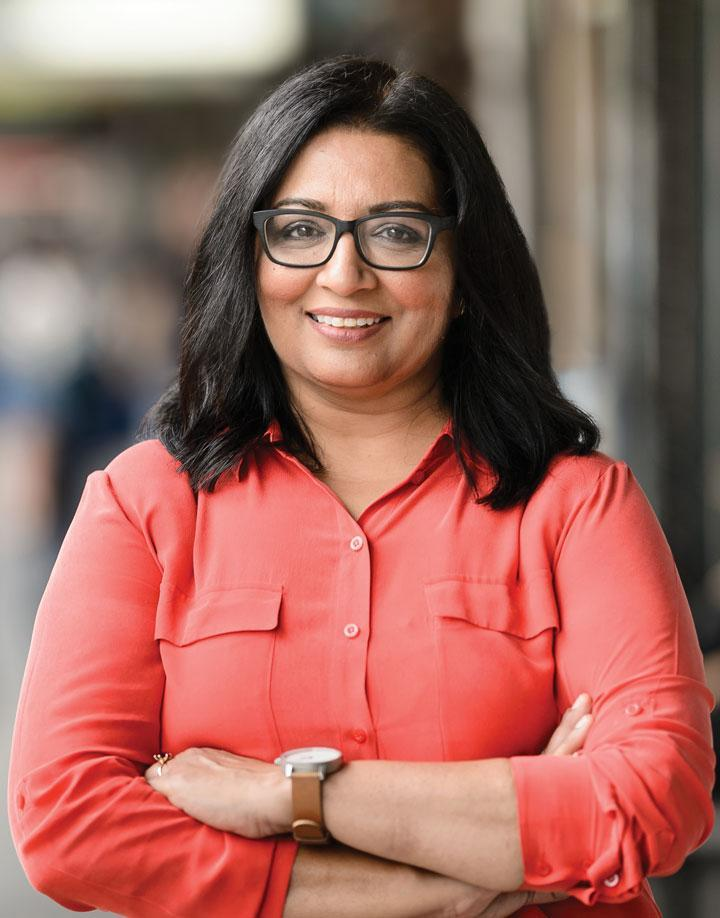

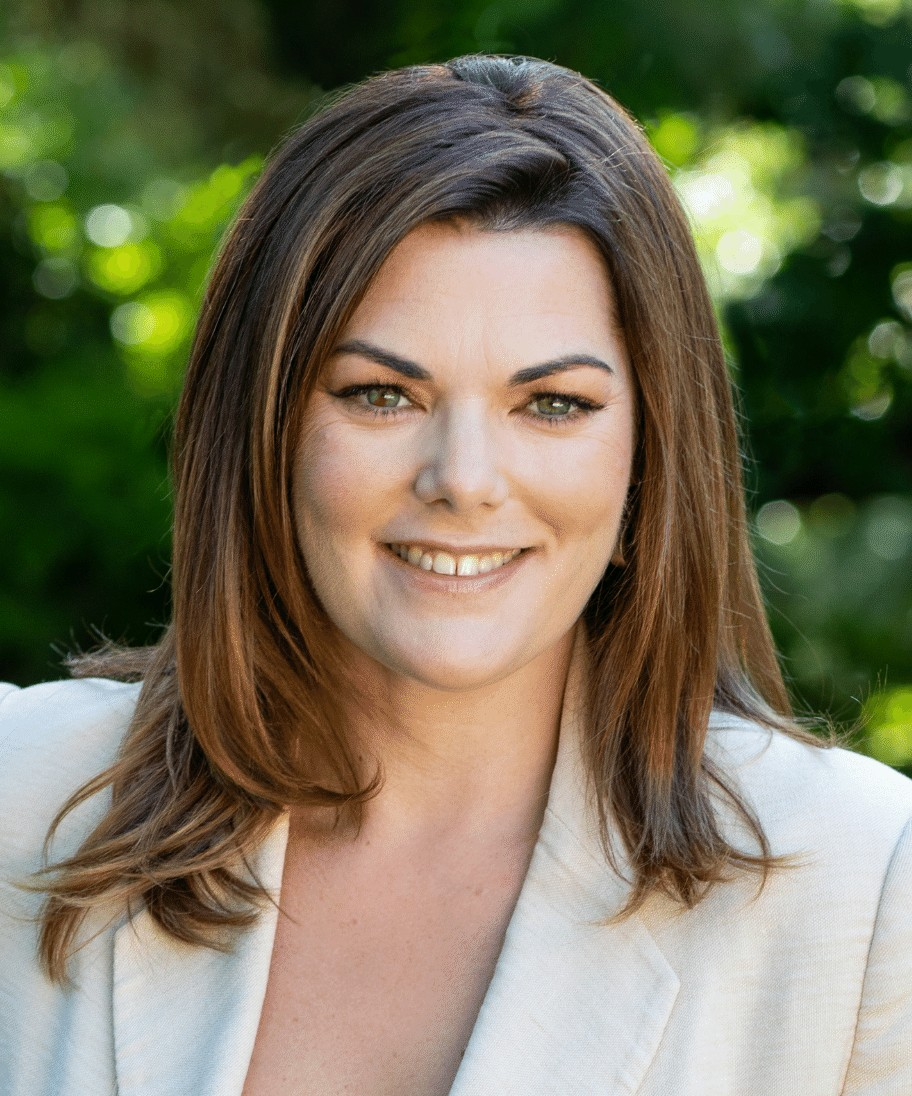
Candidate	Nick McKim	Mehreen Faruqi	Sarah Hanson-Young
Caucus vote	Won	Lost	Lost
Seat	Senator for Tas	Senator for NSW	Senator for SA
Deputy Leaders before election
Adam Bandt and Larissa Waters
Elected Deputy Leaders
Nick McKim and Larissa Waters

== 2022 election ==
2022 Australian Greens leadership election
- 10 June 2022
- Leadership election
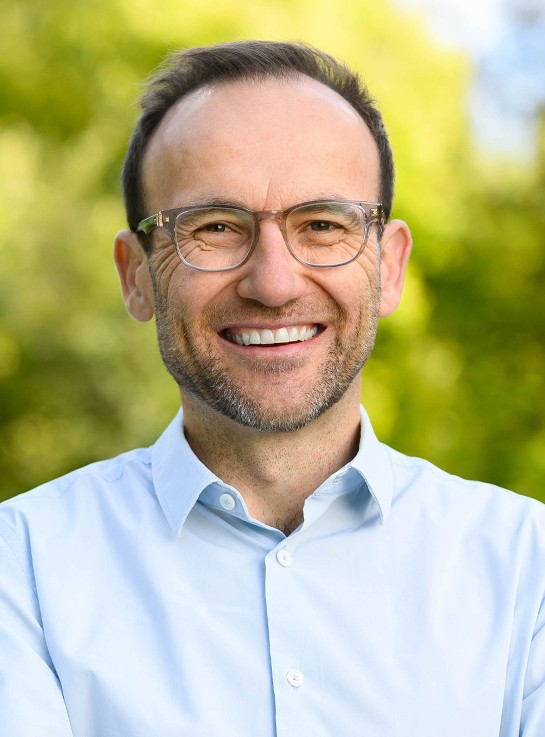
Candidate	Adam Bandt
Caucus vote	Unopposed
Seat	Melbourne (Vic.)
Leader before election
Adam Bandt
Elected Leader
Adam Bandt
- Deputy leadership election
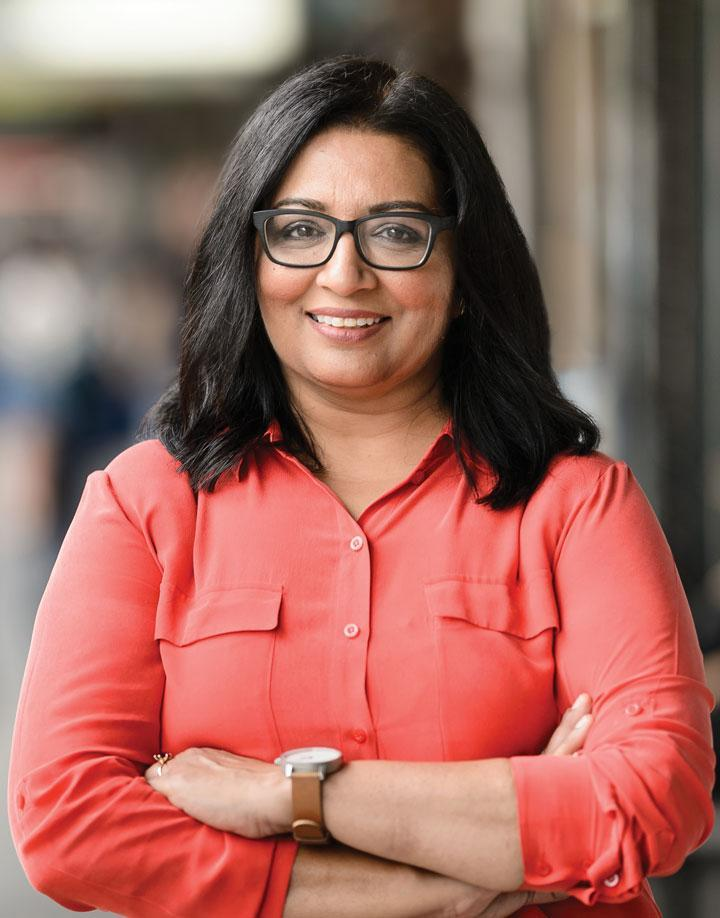
Candidate	Mehreen Faruqi
Caucus vote	Won
Seat	Senator for NSW
Deputy Leader before election
Larissa Waters
Elected Deputy Leader
Mehreen Faruqi

On the 10 June 2022, almost three weeks after the 2022 Australian federal election, the Australian Greens members of parliament met and re-elected Adam Bandt as federal leader of the Greens, "by consensus".

Bandt was sick with COVID-19 and was unable to attend the meeting. The party elected Mehreen Faruqi as deputy leader, replacing Larissa Waters, as well as Larissa Waters as the party's Leader in the Senate, Lidia Thorpe as the Deputy Leader in the Senate, Sarah Hanson-Young as Manager of Greens Business in the Senate, Janet Rice as Party Room Chair, and Nick McKim as Senate Whip.

== 2025 election ==
2025 Australian Greens leadership election
- 15 May 2025
- Leadership election
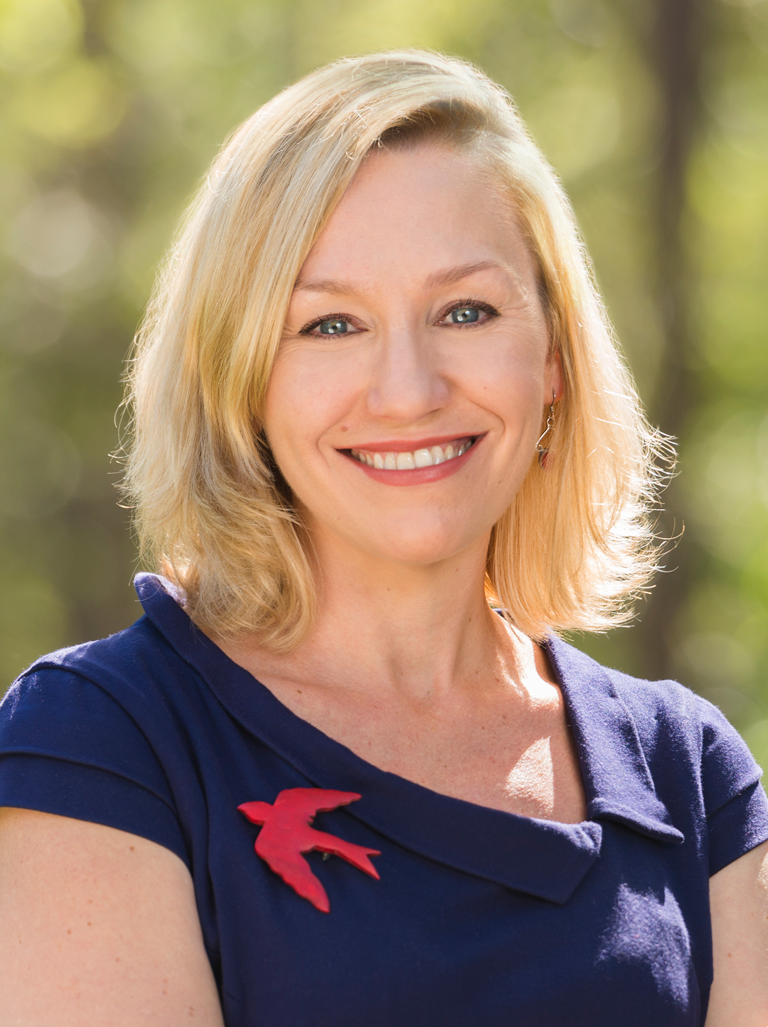
Candidate	Larissa Waters
Caucus vote	Unopposed
Seat	Senator for Qld
Leader before election
Adam Bandt
Elected Leader
Larissa Waters
- Deputy leadership election
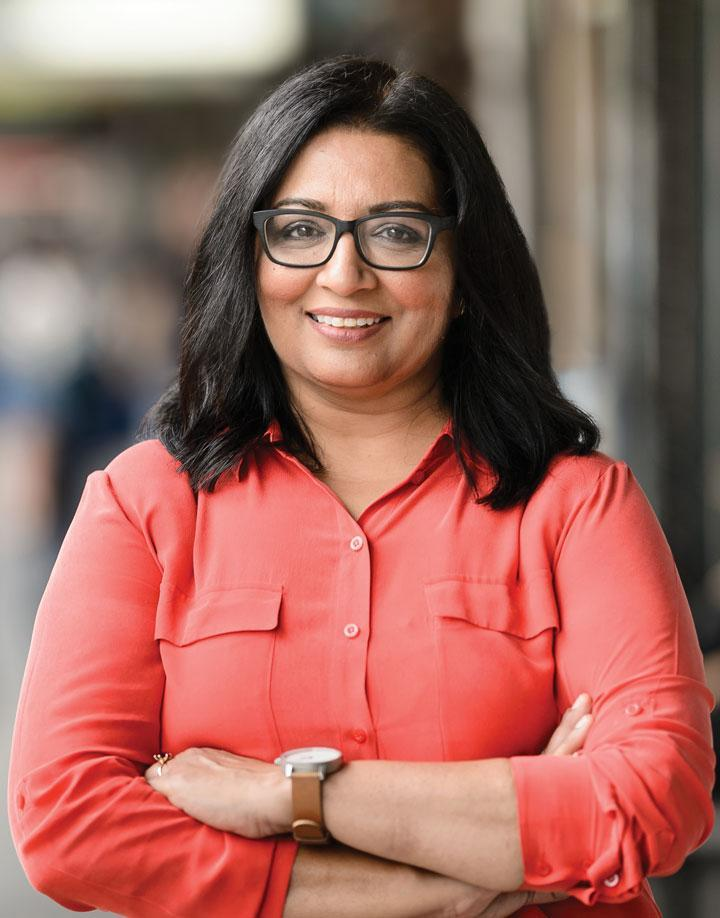

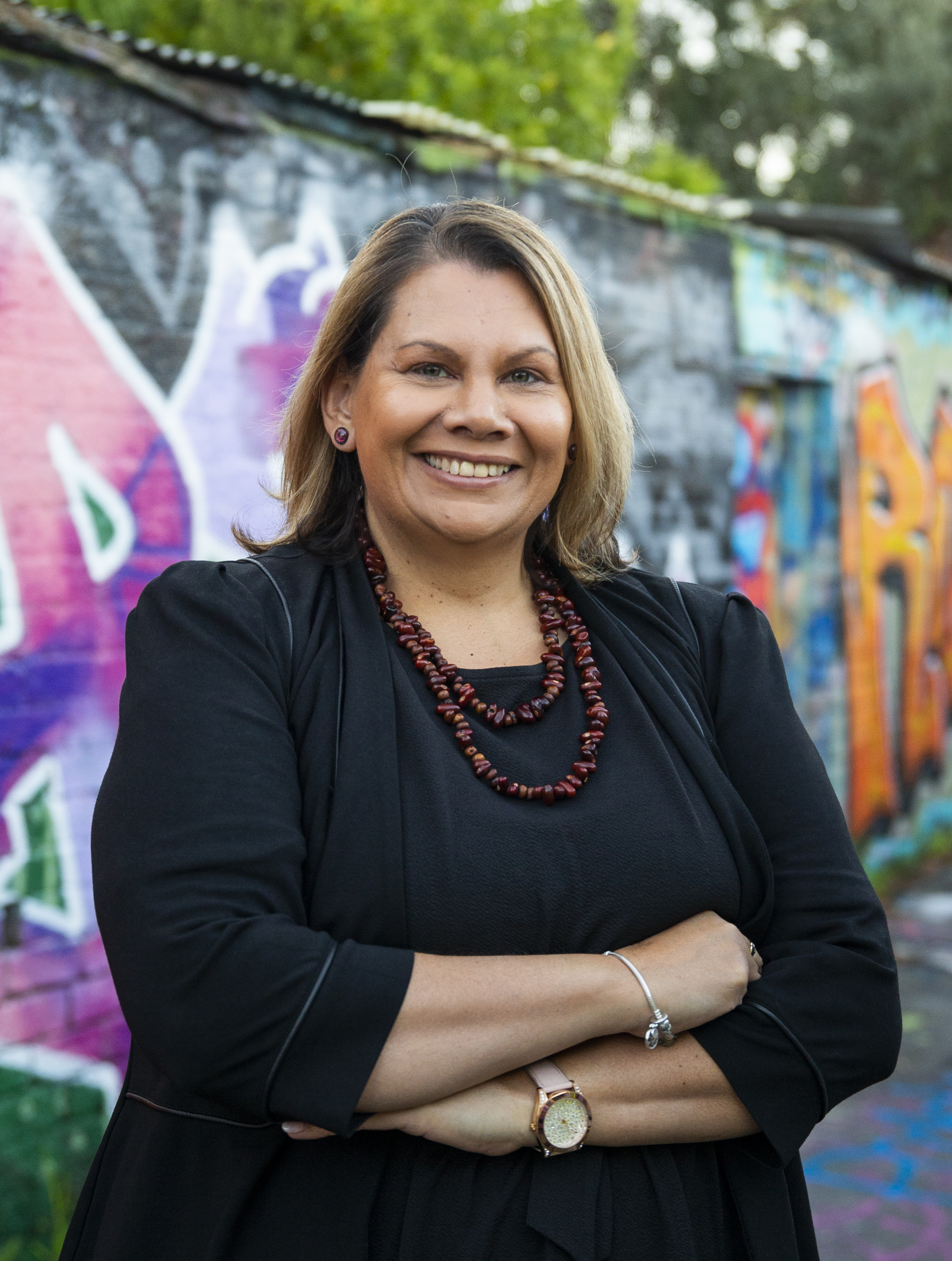
Candidate	Mehreen Faruqi	Dorinda Cox
Caucus vote	9	3
Percentage	75%	25%
Seat	Senator for NSW	Senator for WA
Deputy Leader before election
Mehreen Faruqi
Elected Deputy Leader
Mehreen Faruqi

== 2026 election ==
2026 Australian Greens leadership election
- 30 September 2026
- Leadership election
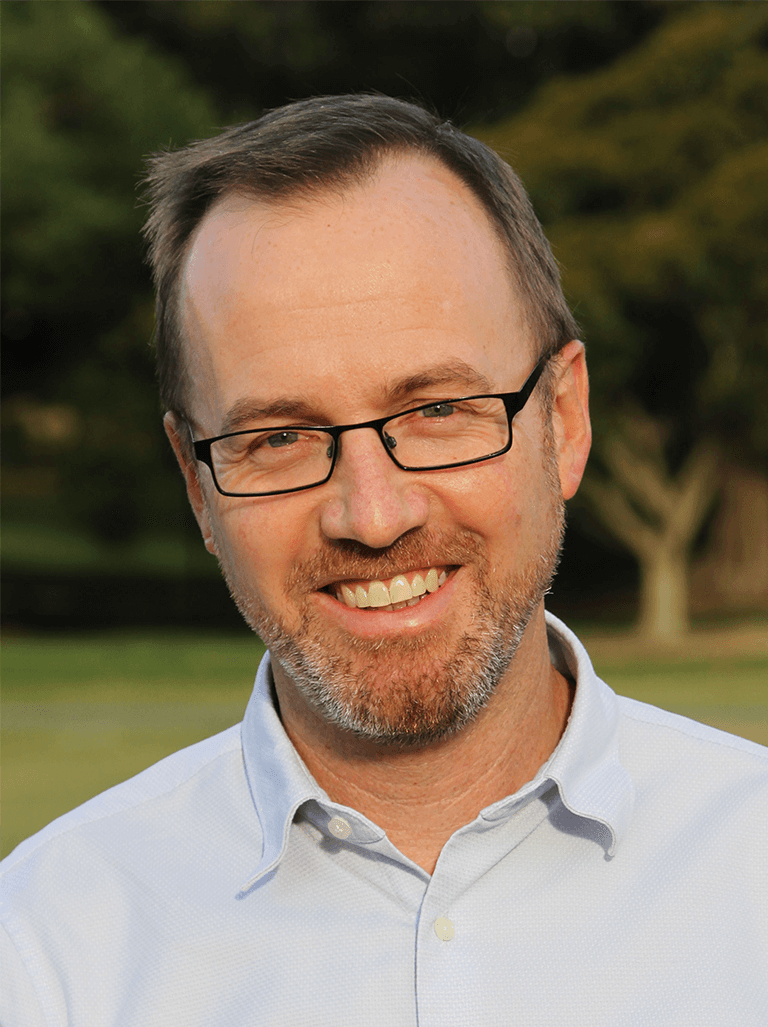

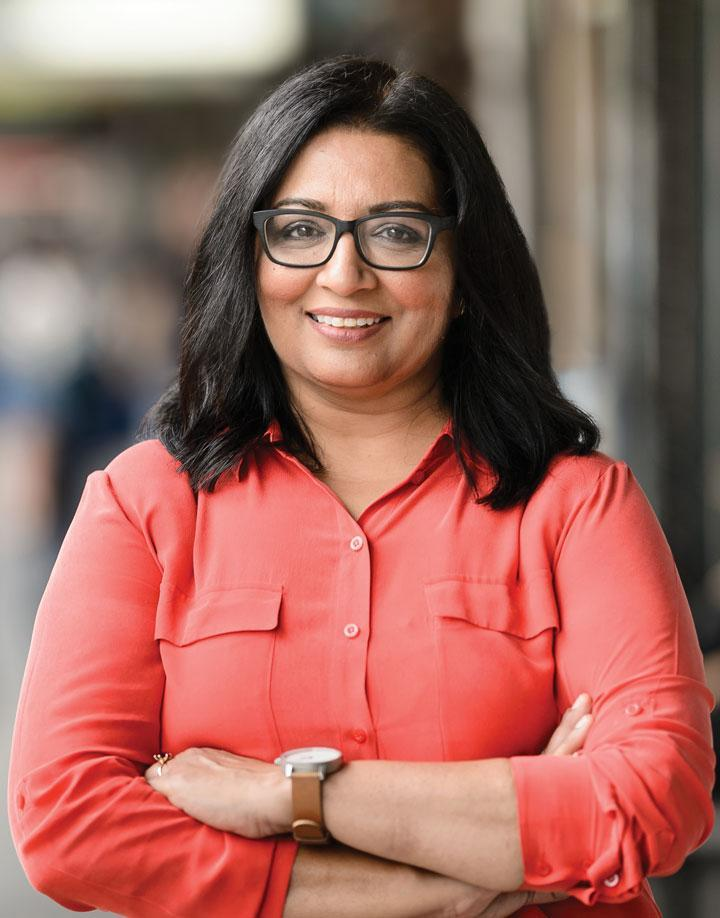

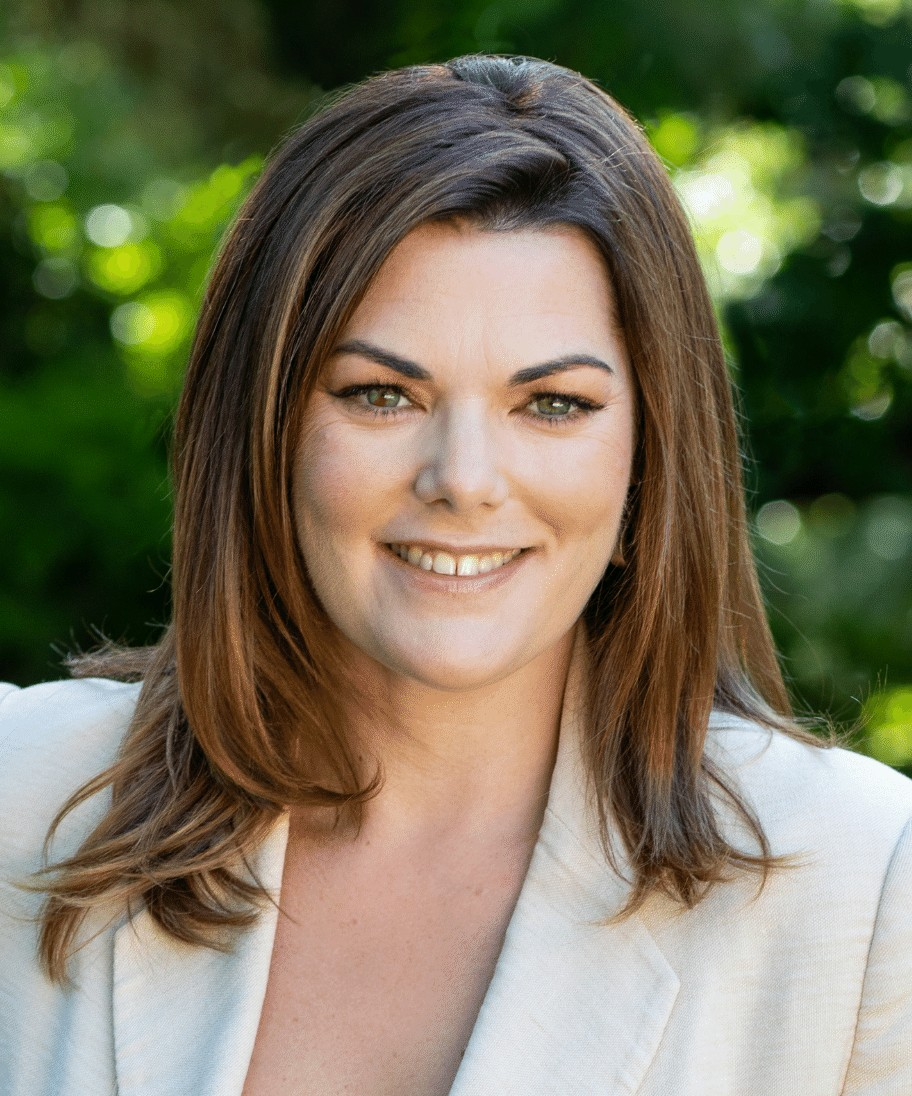
Candidate	David Shoebridge	Mehreen Faruqi	Sarah Hanson-Young
Seat	Senator for NSW	Senator for NSW	Senator for SA
First ballot	6	3	2
Second ballot	7	4	Eliminated
Leader before election
Larissa Waters
Elected Leader
David Shoebridge
- Deputy leadership election
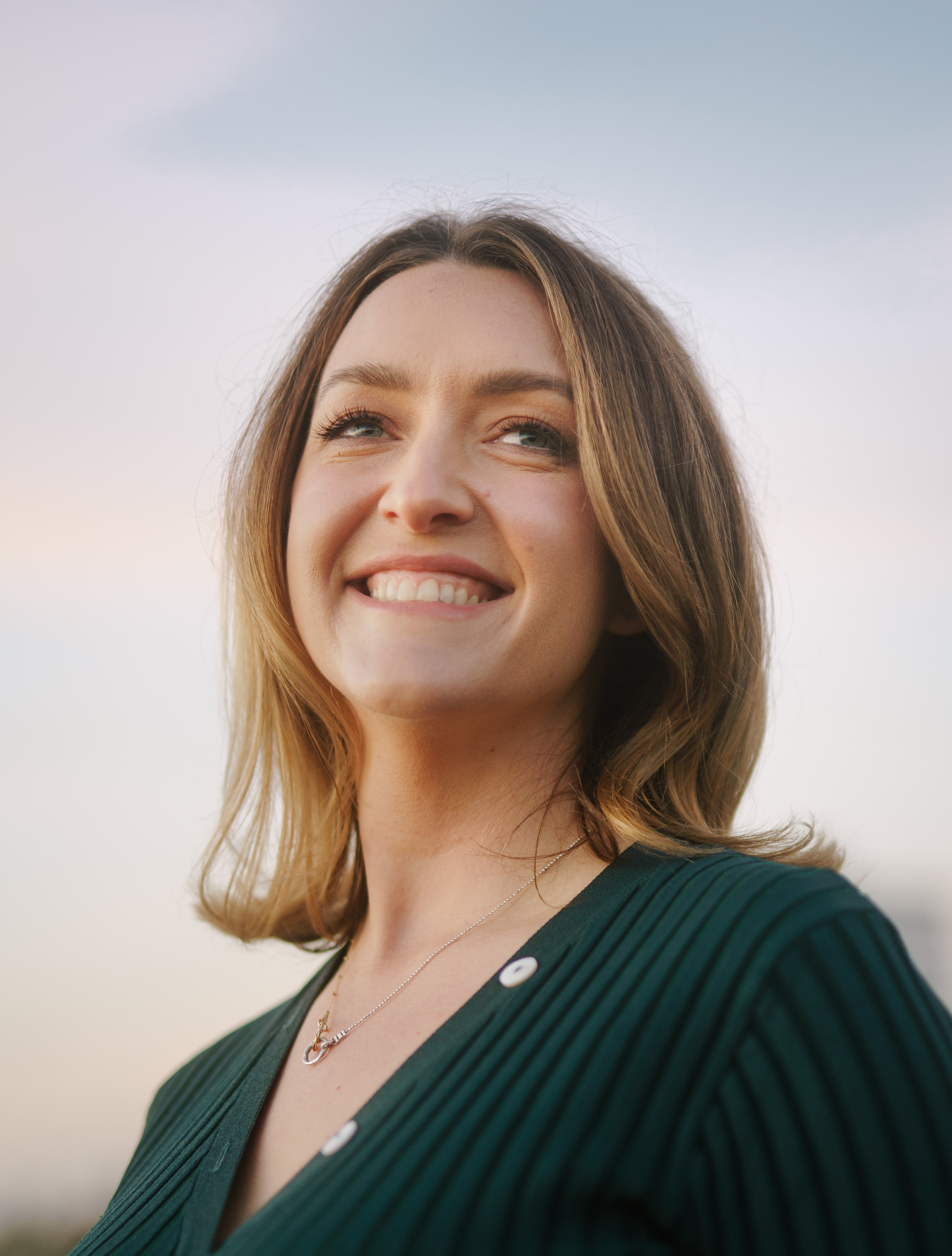

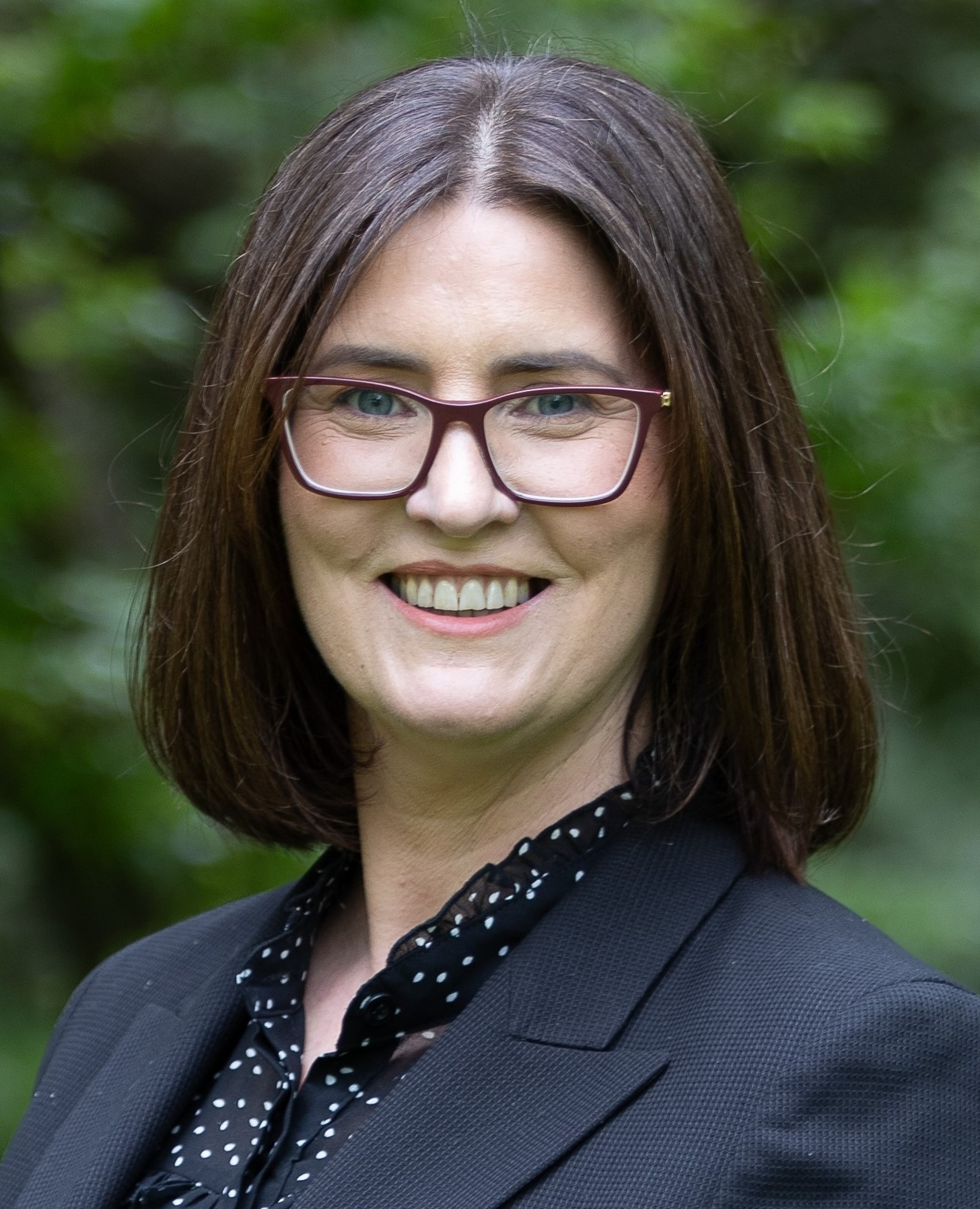

Candidate	Steph Hodgins-May	Vanessa Bleyer	Jordon Steele-John
Seat	Senator for Victoria	Senator for Tasmania	Senator for WA
First ballot	6	3	2
Second ballot	6	5	Eliminated
Deputy Leader before election
Mehreen Faruqi
Elected Deputy Leader
Steph Hodgins-May
