= 2026 Australian Greens leadership election =

- 30 September 2026
- Leadership election

11 caucus members of the Greens 6 votes needed to win

Candidate	David Shoebridge	Mehreen Faruqi	Sarah Hanson-Young
Running mate	Steph Hodgins-May	Nick McKim (Note: McKim did not stand for the deputy leadership position after Faruqi's loss)	N/A
Seat	New South Wales (Senate)	New South Wales (Senate)	South Australia (Senate)
First ballot	6	3	2
Second ballot	7	4	Eliminated
Leader before election
Larissa Waters
Elected Leader
David Shoebridge
- Deputy leadership election
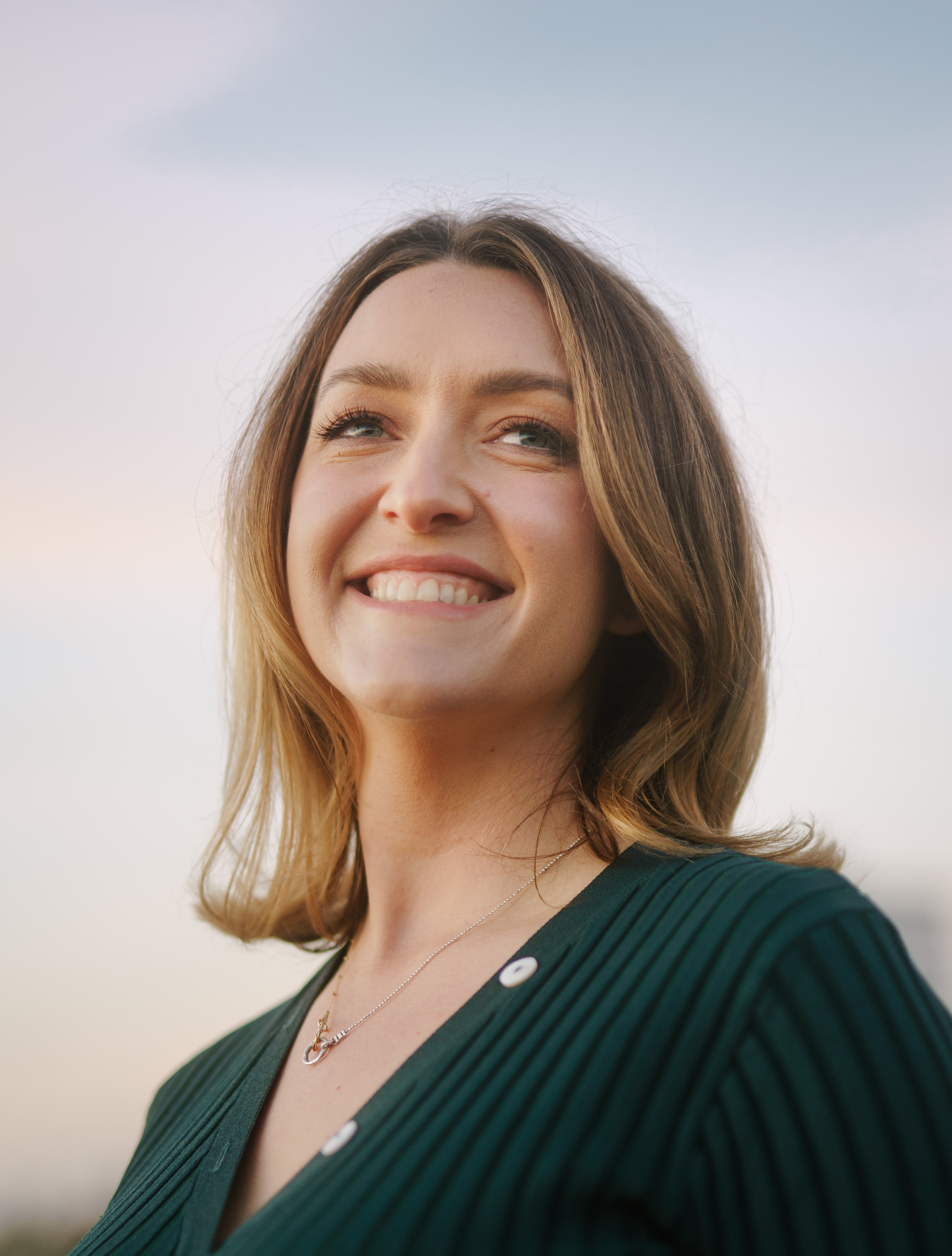

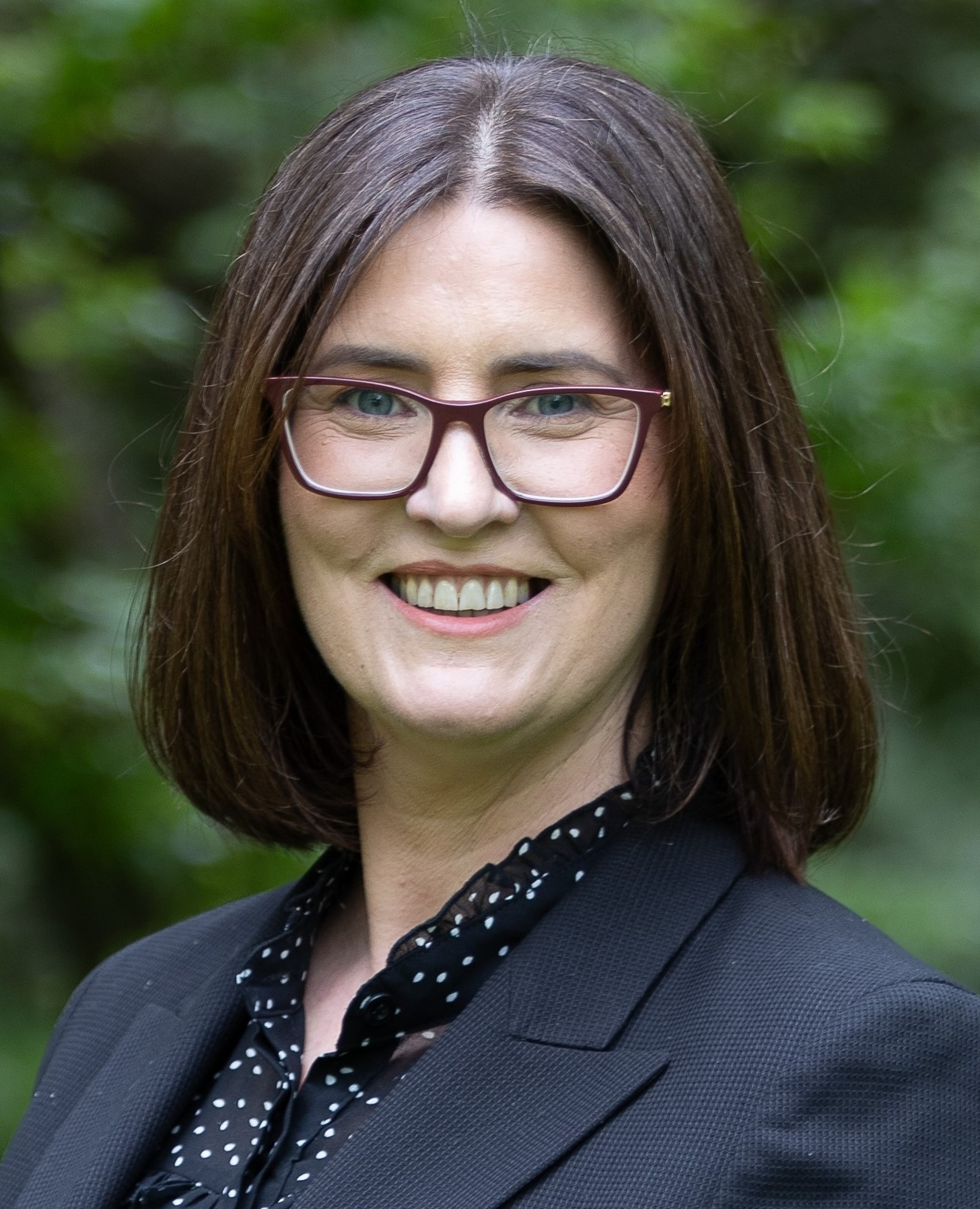

Candidate	Steph Hodgins-May	Vanessa Bleyer	Jordon Steele-John
Running mate	David Shoebridge	N/A	N/A
Seat	Victoria (Senate)	Tasmania (Senate)	Western Australia (Senate)
First ballot	6	3	2
Second ballot	6	5	Eliminated
Deputy Leader before election
Mehreen Faruqi
Elected Deputy Leader
Steph Hodgins-May

A leadership election was held on 30 September 2026 to elect the leader of the Australian Greens after the resignation of Larissa Waters. New South Wales Senator David Shoebridge was elected, defeating Senators Mehreen Faruqi and Sarah Hanson-Young.

A deputy leadership election was held immediately following, with Victorian Senator Steph Hodgins-May being elected over Senators Vanessa Bleyer and Jordon Steele-John.

The election was the first Greens leadership election that was not decided by consensus within party room as all previous leaders have been elected unopposed.

== Background ==
Then-leader Larissa Waters announced her resignation as leader on 28 September due to health issues. Waters was elected leader in 2025 after the federal election, succeeding Adam Bandt.

== Candidates ==
On the morning of 30 September 2026, ABC News reported that Shoebridge, Faruqi, and Hanson-Young would all three be contesting the leadership election.

=== Leader ===
==== Declared ====
Candidate	Electorate	Portfolio(s)
David Shoebridge	Senator for New South Wales	
Mehreen Faruqi	Senator for New South Wales	Deputy Leader of the Greens (2022–2026); Spokesperson for: Education – Tertiary; Anti-Racism; Animal Welfare; International Aid and Global Justice; Republic; Climate Adaptation & Resilience
Sarah Hanson-Young	Senator for South Australia	Manager of Business in the Senate (2022–present); Spokesperson for: Environment and Water; Arts and Communications

=== Deputy leader ===
==== Declared ====
Candidate	Electorate	Portfolio(s)
Steph Hodgins-May	Senator for Victoria	Spokesperson for: Resources; Early Childhood Education; Waste and Recycling; Assistant Spokesperson for: Climate Change and Energy
Vanessa Bleyer	Senator for Tasmania	
Jordon Steele-John	Senator for Western Australia	Spokesperson for: Disability Inclusion and the National Disability Insurance Scheme; Health and Mental Health; Youth

==== Withdrew ====
Candidate	Electorate	Portfolio(s)
Nick McKim	Senator for Tasmania	Acting Leader of the Greens (2025); Senate Whip (2021–present); Co-Deputy Leader of the Greens (2020–2022); Leader of the Tasmanian Greens (2008–2014)

== See also ==
- 2026 ACT Greens leadership ballot
- 2026 Liberal Party of Australia leadership spill
