= 2025 Australian Greens leadership election =

Australian political party election

- 15 May 2025
- Leadership election
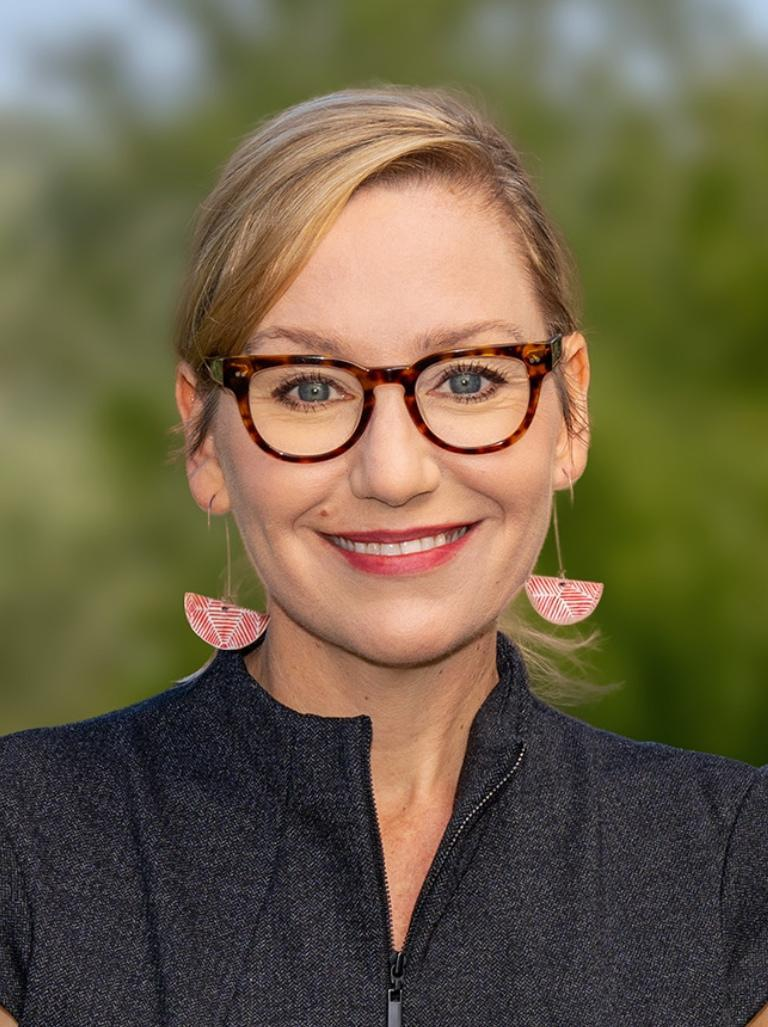
Candidate	Larissa Waters
Caucus vote	Unopposed
Seat	Senator for Qld
Leader before election
Adam Bandt
Elected Leader
Larissa Waters
- Deputy leadership election

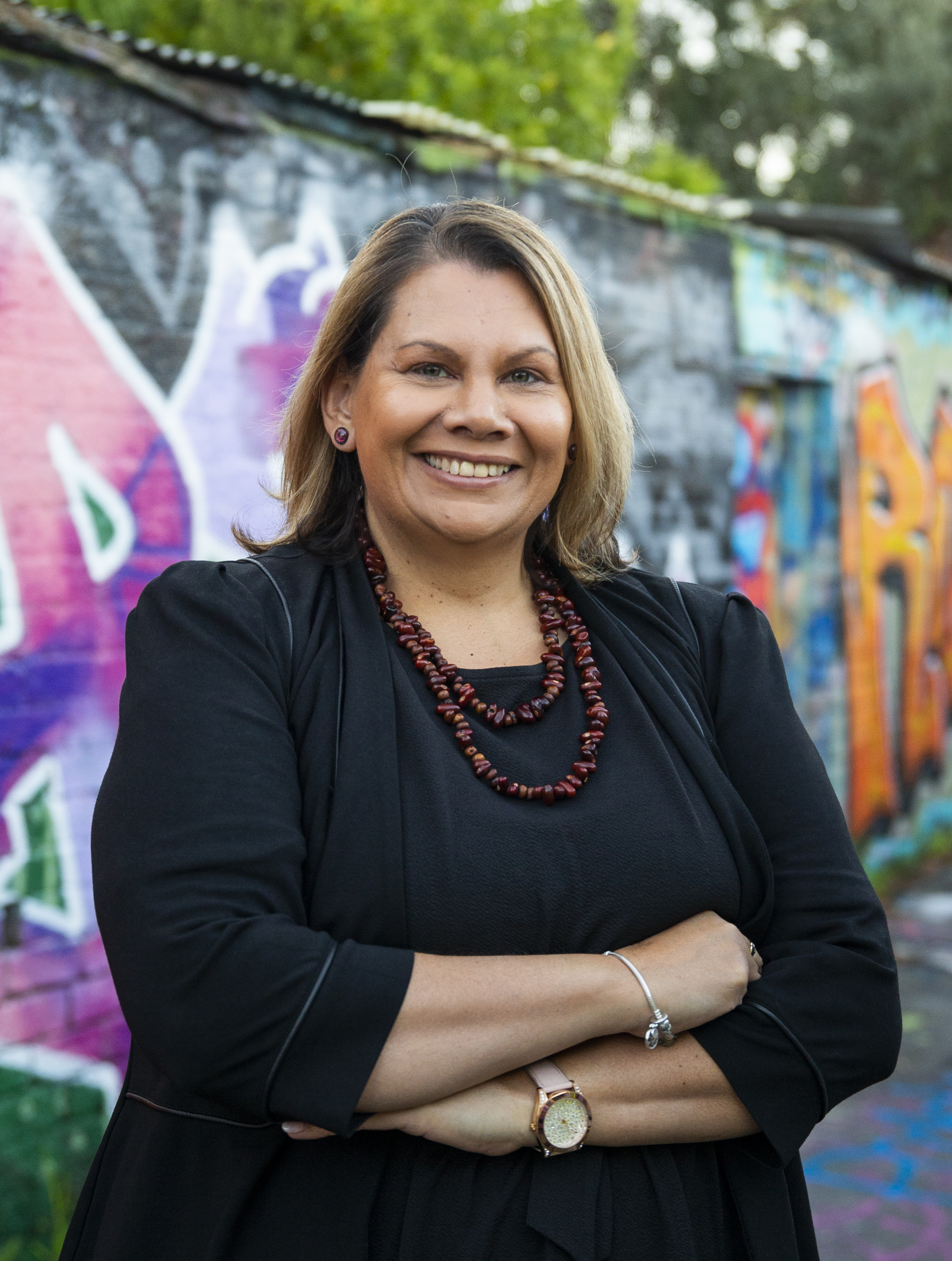
Candidate	Mehreen Faruqi	Dorinda Cox
Caucus vote	9	3
Percentage	75%	25%
Seat	Senator for NSW	Senator for WA
Deputy Leader before election
Mehreen Faruqi
Elected Deputy Leader
Mehreen Faruqi

The 2025 Australian Greens leadership election was held on 15 May 2025 to elect the leader of the Australian Greens.

Larissa Waters was elected unopposed to replace Adam Bandt, who resigned the leadership after losing his seat of Melbourne at the 2025 federal election. Mehreen Faruqi was re-elected deputy leader after defeating Dorinda Cox nine votes to three.

The Greens hold an automatic leadership election following every federal election. The leadership is decided by consensus within the party room (or a party room vote if consensus cannot be reached), and all previous Greens leaders have been elected unopposed.

== Background ==
Following the federal election held on 3 May 2025, the Greens conceded defeat in Brisbane and Griffith, but were expected to retain Melbourne on the night of 3 May. Bandt also said he intended to remain Greens leader, "but obviously that's up to my colleagues".

On 7 May 2025, major media outlets projected that Bandt would lose Melbourne to Labor candidate Sarah Witty. He conceded defeat the following day. Tasmanian senator Nick McKim was appointed acting leader and stated that he would not contest the leadership election.

== Candidates ==
On 14 May 2025 (one day before the leadership vote), news.com.au reported that Faruqi, Hanson-Young and Waters could all three be declared as co-leaders.

=== Leader ===
==== Declared ====
Candidate	Electorate	Portfolio(s)
Larissa Waters	Senator for Queensland	Leader of the Greens in the Senate (2020–present); Co-Deputy Leader of the Greens (2015–2017; 2018–2022)

==== Declined ====
Candidate	Electorate	Declined	Portfolio(s)
Nick McKim	Senator for Tasmania	9 May 2025	Acting Leader of the Greens (2025); Senate Whip (2021–present); Co-Deputy Leader of the Greens (2020–2022)
David Shoebridge	Senator for New South Wales	11 May 2025	

==== Speculated ====
Candidate	Electorate	Portfolio(s)
Mehreen Faruqi	Senator for New South Wales	Deputy Leader of the Greens (2022–present); Spokesperson for: Education – Tertiary; Anti-Racism; Animal Welfare; International Aid and Global Justice; Republic; Climate Adaptation & Resilience
Sarah Hanson-Young	Senator for South Australia	Manager of Business in the Senate (2022–present); Spokesperson for: Environment and Water; Arts and Communications
Jordon Steele-John	Senator for Western Australia	Spokesperson for: Health; Disability Rights and Services; Foreign Affairs; Peace and Nuclear Disarmament

=== Deputy leader ===
==== Declared ====
Candidate	Electorate	Portfolio(s)
Mehreen Faruqi	Senator for New South Wales	Deputy Leader of the Greens (2022–present)
Dorinda Cox	Senator for Western Australia	

==== Speculated ====
Candidate	Electorate	Portfolio(s)
David Shoebridge	Senator for New South Wales	Spokesperson for: Digital Rights and IT; Justice; Attorney-General's Department; Drug law reform; Defence and Veterans' Affairs; Home Affairs, Immigration, Citizenship and Multicultural Affairs

== Endorsements ==
Bandt stated prior to the vote that he would not endorse any candidate. The Australian Young Greens formally opposed Hanson-Young becoming leader, but did not make an endorsement.

=== Mehreen Faruqi ===
List of Mehreen Faruqi endorsements

Internal Greens groups

- Australian Greens First Nations Network
- New South Wales Young Greens

=== Sarah Hanson-Young ===
List of Sarah Hanson-Young endorsements

Media personalities

- Hannah Ferguson – CEO of Cheek Media

== See also ==
- 2025 Liberal Party of Australia leadership election
- 2025 National Party of Australia leadership spill
