= 2020 Australian Greens leadership election =

Australian political party election

- 4 February 2020
- Leadership election
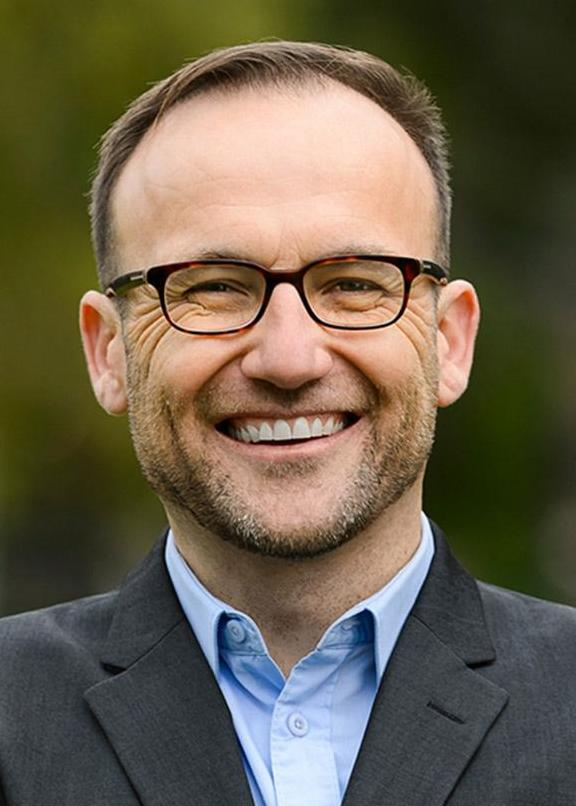
Candidate	Adam Bandt
Caucus vote	Unopposed
Seat	Melbourne (Vic)
Leader before election
Richard Di Natale
Elected Leader
Adam Bandt
- Senate and first co-deputy leadership election
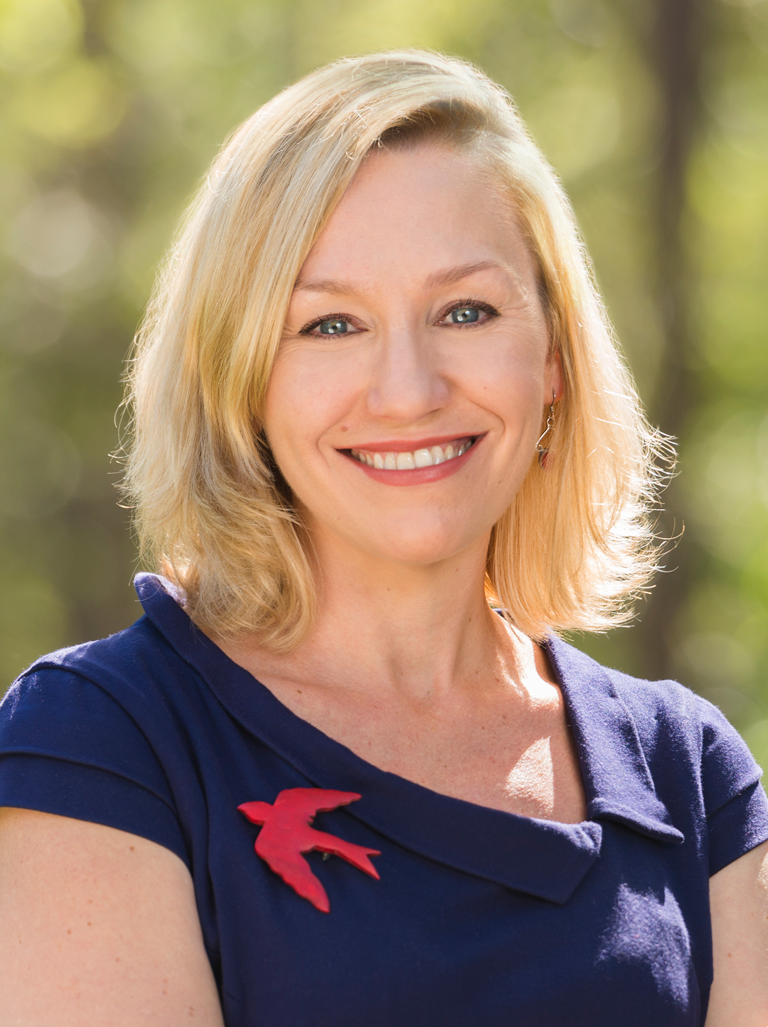
Candidate	Larissa Waters
Caucus vote	Unopposed
Seat	Senator for Qld
- Second co-deputy leadership election
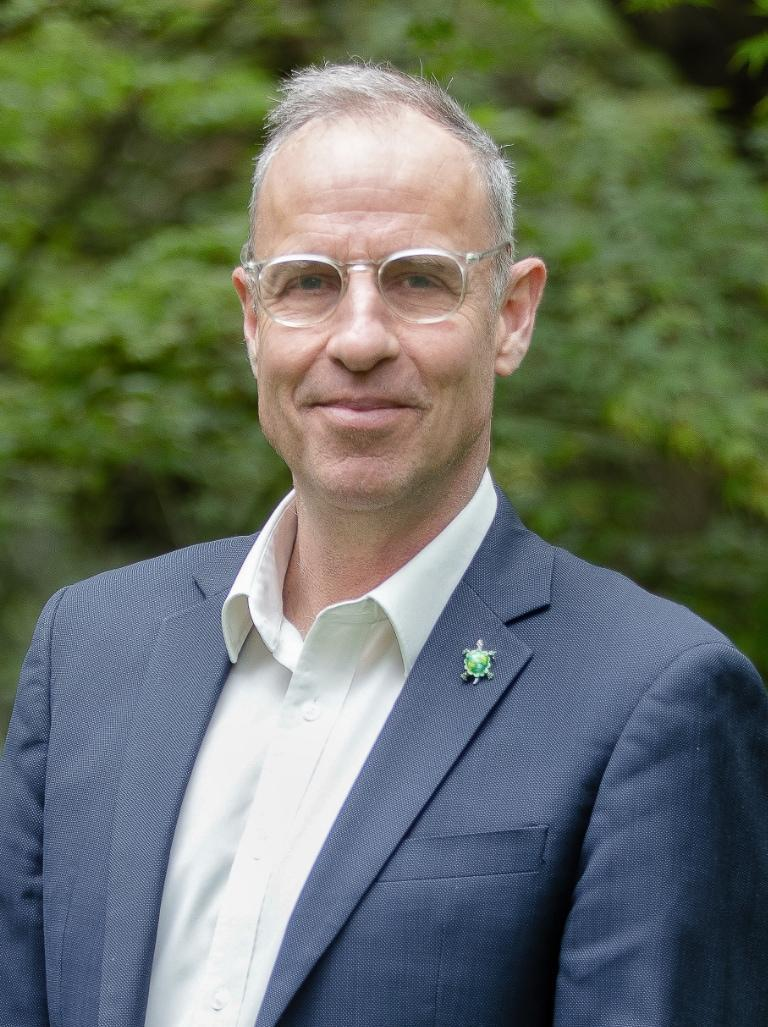

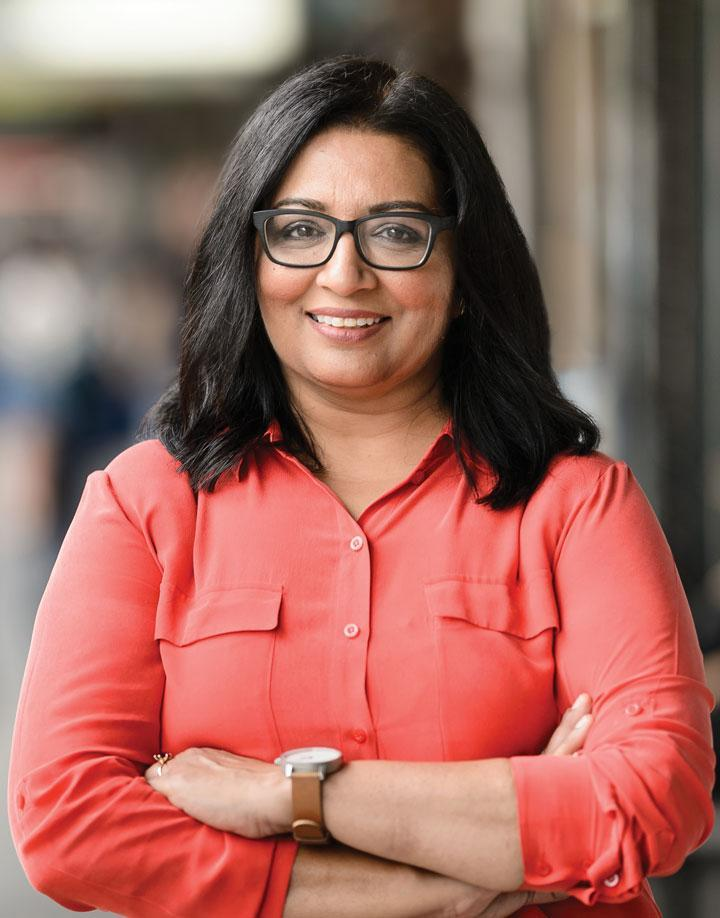

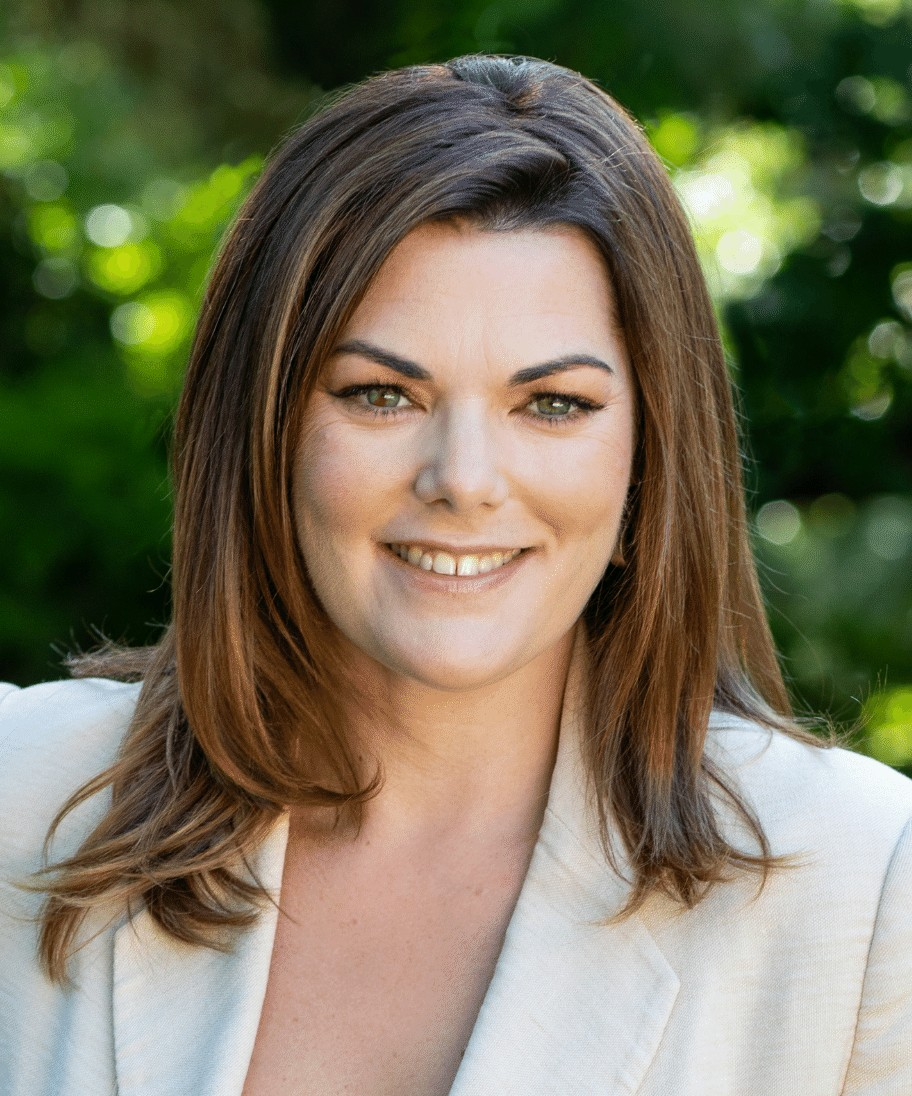
Candidate	Nick McKim	Mehreen Faruqi	Sarah Hanson-Young
Caucus vote	Won	Lost	Lost
Seat	Senator for Tas	Senator for NSW	Senator for SA
Deputy Leaders before election
Adam Bandt and Larissa Waters
Elected Deputy Leaders
Nick McKim and Larissa Waters

The 2020 Australian Greens leadership election was held on 4 February 2020 to elect the leader of the Australian Greens. The election took place after Richard Di Natale announced his resignation as leader and his intention to resign from parliament.

Adam Bandt, the member for Melbourne, was elected to the leadership unopposed, becoming the first Greens leader to sit in the House of Representatives and not the Senate.

In the deputy leadership contest, Larissa Waters was returned unopposed as the party's leader in the Senate. The second deputy leadership position was contested by Mehreen Faruqi, Sarah Hanson-Young and Nick McKim, with McKim emerging successful.

The leadership of the Greens is decided by consensus within the party room (or a party room vote if consensus cannot be reached).

== Candidates ==
=== Leader ===
==== Declared ====
Candidate	Electorate	Announced	Portfolio(s)
Adam Bandt	Melbourne (Vic)	3 February 2020	Co-Deputy Leader of the Greens

=== Deputy leader ===
==== Declared ====
Candidate	Electorate	Announced	Portfolio(s)
Mehreen Faruqi	Senator for New South Wales	4 February 2020	
Sarah Hanson-Young	Senator for South Australia	4 February 2020	
Nick McKim	Senator for Tasmania	4 February 2020	
Larissa Waters	Senator for Queensland	3 February 2020	Co-Deputy Leader of the Greens

== Leadership plebiscite ==
2020 Australian Greens leadership plebiscite
- 13 April–11 May 2020

Following the leadership vote, the rank-and-file membership of the Greens voted in a plebiscite about the party's leadership election process. Voting began on 13 April 2020 and concluded on 11 May 2020.

The formal campaign in favour of a "one member, one vote" model began in April 2018 with the formation of the "Greens for Democratic Leadership" group, led by Brisbane councillor Jonathan Sri.

=== Options ===
Greens members were presented with three options for conducting leadership elections:

- One Member, One Vote (OMOV): "Australian Greens members vote with all votes counting equally in an optional preferential ballot. Candidates for leader must have their nomination supported by a threshold of 20% of Party Room or two MPs including themselves (whichever is the greater)"
- 50/50 Model: "Australian Greens members vote as a group and Federal MPs vote as a group, with each group of votes given a weighting of 50% when combined towards the overall result"
- Federal MPs Selection Model: "Federal MPs continue to vote to decide who will be the leader either by consensus decision-making or a vote"

=== Results ===
Although both OMOV and the 50/50 Model received more votes than the present "federal MPs selection model" system, a two-thirds majority was required to force a change.

For a Greens plebiscite to be valid, a turnout of 20% is required. The leadership plebiscite had 6,065 voters out of 13,143 eligible members – a turnout of 46.15%.

Question	Options	OMOV		50/50		Fed. MPs		Abstained	
Question	Options	Votes	%	Votes	%	Votes	%	Votes	%
Question 1	One Member, One Vote or Federal MPs Selection Model	3,721	62.00	—N/a		2,281	38.00	63	1.03
Question 2	50/50 Model or Federal MPs Selection Model	—N/a		3,510	62.56	2,101	37.44	454	7.48
Question 3	One Member, One Vote or 50/50 Model	2,902	49.05	3,014	50.95	—N/a		149	2.45

=== Endorsements ===
==== One Member, One Vote ====
List of One Member, One Vote endorsements

Internal Greens groups

- Greens for Democratic Leadership

Members of the Australian Parliament

- Mehreen Faruqi – Senator for New South Wales

Members of state/territory parliaments

- Michael Berkman – MP for Maiwar in the Queensland Legislative Assembly
- Abigail Boyd – Member of the New South Wales Legislative Council
- Tammy Franks – Member of the South Australian Legislative Council
- Jenny Leong – MP for Newtown in the New South Wales Legislative Assembly
- Jamie Parker – MP for Balmain in the New South Wales Legislative Assembly
- David Shoebridge – Member of the New South Wales Legislative Council

Local government councillors

- Tim Baxter – Councillor of the City of Port Phillip for Canal Ward
- Amanda Cohn – Deputy Mayor of the City of Albury
- Linda Eisler – Councillor of the City of Canterbury Bankstown for Canterbury Ward
- Tom Kiat – Councillor of Inner West Council for Ashfield Ward
- Rohan Leppert – Councillor of the City of Melbourne
- Jonathan Sri – Councillor of the City of Brisbane for The Gabba Ward
- Danielle Wheeler – Councillor of the City of Hawkesbury

Former members of the Australian Parliament

- Andrew Bartlett – Senator for Queensland (2017–2018)
- Scott Ludlam – Senator for Western Australia (2008–2017)
- Lee Rhiannon – Senator for New South Wales (2011–2018)

Former members of state/territory parliaments

- Sylvia Hale – Member of the New South Wales Legislative Council (2003–2010)

Former local government councillors

- Therese Doyle – Councillor of the Municipality of Concord (1995–2000) and the City of Newcastle (2012–2017)
- Cathy Peters – Councillor of Marrickville Council
- Leigh Williams – Councillor of the City of Hawkesbury (1999–2016)

Other figures

- Penny Allman-Payne – Queensland Greens convenor
- Alex Bhathal – Candidate for Batman (2001, 2004, 2010, 2013, 2016, 2018)
- Max Chandler-Mather – Candidate for Griffith (2019)
- Emma Davidson – Candidate for Murrumbidgee (2016, 2020)
- Tim Hollo – Executive Director of the Green Institute
- Amy MacMahon – Candidate for South Brisbane (2017)
- Emerald Moon – Candidate for Bowman (2019)
- Polly Morgan – Candidate for Malvern (2018)
- Apsara Sabaratnam – Secretary of Multicultural Greens Victoria

==== 50/50 Model ====
List of 50/50 Model endorsements

Former leaders of the Australian Greens

- Bob Brown (2005–2012)
- Christine Milne (2012–2015)
- Richard Di Natale (2015–2020)

Members of the Australian Parliament

- Nick McKim – Senator for Tasmania
- Peter Whish-Wilson – Senator for Tasmania
