= Leaders of the Australian Greens =

There are leaders of the Australian Greens at the federal level, as well as in the several member parties which make up the confederation of the Australian Greens.

== Background ==
On Saturday 12 November 2005 at the national conference in Hobart the Australian Greens abandoned their long-standing tradition of having no official leader and approved a process whereby a parliamentary leader could be elected by the Greens Parliamentary Party Room. On Monday 28 November 2005, Bob Brown – who had long been regarded as de facto leader by many inside the party, and most people outside the party – was elected unopposed as the Parliamentary Party Leader.

Most of the state and territory parties do not have a formal leader, and instead they have a shared leadership structure. However, Tasmania, Victoria, and the ACT, have adopted singular leadership structures into their party.

== Federal leaders ==
The federal leaders of the Australian Greens have been as follows:

#	Leader (birth–death)	Electorate	Term start	Term end	Time in office	Elections contested	Prime Minister (term)
1	Bob Brown (1944–)	Senator for Tasmania	28 November 2005	13 April 2012	6 years, 137 days	2007, 2010	Howard 1996–2007
1	Bob Brown (1944–)	Senator for Tasmania	28 November 2005	13 April 2012	6 years, 137 days	2007, 2010	Rudd 2007–2010
1	Bob Brown (1944–)	Senator for Tasmania	28 November 2005	13 April 2012	6 years, 137 days	2007, 2010	Gillard 2010–2013
2	Christine Milne (1953–)	Senator for Tasmania	13 April 2012	6 May 2015	3 years, 23 days	2013	Gillard 2010–2013
2	Christine Milne (1953–)	Senator for Tasmania	13 April 2012	6 May 2015	3 years, 23 days	2013	Rudd 2013
2	Christine Milne (1953–)	Senator for Tasmania	13 April 2012	6 May 2015	3 years, 23 days	2013	Abbott 2013–2015
3	Richard Di Natale (1970–)	Senator for Victoria	6 May 2015	3 February 2020	4 years, 273 days	2016, 2019	Abbott 2013–2015
3	Richard Di Natale (1970–)	Senator for Victoria	6 May 2015	3 February 2020	4 years, 273 days	2016, 2019	Turnbull 2015–2018
3	Richard Di Natale (1970–)	Senator for Victoria	6 May 2015	3 February 2020	4 years, 273 days	2016, 2019	Morrison 2018–2022
4	Adam Bandt (1972–)	Melbourne (Vic.)	4 February 2020 (Election)	8 May 2025	5 years, 93 days	2022, 2025	Morrison 2018–2022
4	Adam Bandt (1972–)	Melbourne (Vic.)	4 February 2020 (Election)	8 May 2025	5 years, 93 days	2022, 2025	Albanese 2022–present
-	Nick McKim served as Acting Leader during this interim, following the resignation of Adam Bandt.						Albanese 2022–present
5	Larissa Waters (1977–)	Senator for Queensland	15 May 2025 (Election)	30 September 2026	1 year, 138 days	None	Albanese 2022–present
6	David Shoebridge (1971–)	Senator for New South Wales	30 September 2026 (Election)	Incumbent	18 days	–	Albanese 2022–present

== Federal deputy leaders ==
Shown in chronological order of leadership

#	Deputy Leader/Co-Leader		Term start	Term end	Time in office	Leader
1	Christine Milne		10 November 2008	13 April 2012	3 years, 155 days	Bob Brown
2	Adam Bandt		13 April 2012	6 May 2015	3 years, 23 days	Christine Milne
3	Scott Ludlam	Larissa Waters	6 May 2015	18 July 2017	2 years, 73 days	Richard Di Natale
4	Adam Bandt	Larissa Waters	21 July 2017	4 February 2020	2 years, 198 days	Richard Di Natale
5	Nick McKim	Larissa Waters	4 February 2020	10 June 2022	2 years, 126 days	Adam Bandt
6	Mehreen Faruqi		10 June 2022	30 September 2026	4 years, 112 days	Adam Bandt
6	Mehreen Faruqi		10 June 2022	30 September 2026	4 years, 112 days	Larissa Waters
7	Steph Hodgins-May		30 September 2026	Incumbent	18 days	David Shoebridge

== Senate Leaders ==
=== Leaders in the Senate ===
#	Leader	Term start	Term end	Time in office	Leader
1	Larissa Waters	4 February 2020	15 May 2025	5 years, 100 days	Adam Bandt

=== Deputy Leaders in the Senate ===
#	Deputy Leader	Term start	Term end	Time in office	Party Leader	Senate Leader
1	Lidia Thorpe	10 June 2022	20 October 2022	130 days	Adam Bandt	Larissa Waters

== Member party leaders ==
=== Australian Capital Territory ===
No.	Leader (birth–death)	Portrait	Electorate	Took office	Left office	Term	Chief Minister (term)
1	Kerrie Tucker (b. 1948)		Molonglo	21 February 1998	16 October 2004	6 years, 238 days	Carnell (1995–2000)
1	Kerrie Tucker (b. 1948)		Molonglo	21 February 1998	16 October 2004	6 years, 238 days	Humphries (2000–2001)
1	Kerrie Tucker (b. 1948)		Molonglo	21 February 1998	16 October 2004	6 years, 238 days	Stanhope (2001–2011)
2	Deb Foskey (1949–2020)		Molonglo	16 October 2004	18 October 2008	4 years, 2 days	Stanhope (2001–2011)
3	Meredith Hunter (b. 1962)		Ginninderra	18 October 2008	20 October 2012	4 years, 2 days	Stanhope (2001–2011)
3	Meredith Hunter (b. 1962)		Ginninderra	18 October 2008	20 October 2012	4 years, 2 days	Gallagher (2011–2014)
4	Shane Rattenbury (b. 1971)		Molonglo (2008–2016)	20 October 2012	15 May 2026	13 years, 207 days	Gallagher (2011–2014)
4	Shane Rattenbury (b. 1971)		Molonglo (2008–2016)	20 October 2012	15 May 2026	13 years, 207 days	Barr (2014–)
4	Shane Rattenbury (b. 1971)		Kurrajong (2016–2026)	20 October 2012	15 May 2026	13 years, 207 days	Barr (2014–)
5	Jo Clay (b. 1977)		Ginninderra	15 May 2026	Incumbent	156 days	Barr (2014–)

=== New South Wales ===
The New South Wales greens have never had a parliamentary leader

=== Northern Territory ===
The Northern Territory greens have never had a parliamentary leader

=== Queensland ===
The Queensland greens have never had a parliamentary leader

=== South Australia ===
The South Australian greens have never had a parliamentary leader

=== Tasmania ===
#	Leader	Electorate	Term start	Term end	Time in office	Elections contested	Premier (term)
1	Bob Brown	Denison	13 May 1992	13 March 1993	304 days	None	Groom 1992–1996
2	Christine Milne	Lyons	13 March 1993	29 August 1998	5 years, 169 days	1996, 1998	Groom 1992–1996
2	Christine Milne	Lyons	13 March 1993	29 August 1998	5 years, 169 days	1996, 1998	Rundle 1996–1998
3	Peg Putt	Denison	29 August 1998	7 July 2008	9 years, 313 days	2002, 2006	Rundle 1996–1998
3	Peg Putt	Denison	29 August 1998	7 July 2008	9 years, 313 days	2002, 2006	Bacon 1998–2004
3	Peg Putt	Denison	29 August 1998	7 July 2008	9 years, 313 days	2002, 2006	Lennon 2004–2008
3	Peg Putt	Denison	29 August 1998	7 July 2008	9 years, 313 days	2002, 2006	Bartlett 2008–2011
4	Nick McKim	Franklin	7 July 2008	7 April 2014	5 years, 274 days	2010, 2014	Bartlett 2008–2011
4	Nick McKim	Franklin	7 July 2008	7 April 2014	5 years, 274 days	2010, 2014	Giddings 2011–2014
4	Nick McKim	Franklin	7 July 2008	7 April 2014	5 years, 274 days	2010, 2014	Hodgman 2014–2020
5	Kim Booth	Bass	7 April 2014	20 May 2015	1 year, 30 days	None	Hodgman 2014–2020
6	Cassy O'Connor	Clark	12 June 2015	13 July 2023	8 years, 31 days	2018, 2021	Hodgman 2014–2020
6	Cassy O'Connor	Clark	12 June 2015	13 July 2023	8 years, 31 days	2018, 2021	Gutwein 2020–2022
6	Cassy O'Connor	Clark	12 June 2015	13 July 2023	8 years, 31 days	2018, 2021	Rockliff 2022-
7	Rosalie Woodruff	Franklin	13 July 2023	Incumbent	3 years, 97 days	2024, 2025	Rockliff 2022-

=== Victoria ===
#	Leader	Seat	Term start	Term end	Time in office	Elections contested	Premier (term)
1	Greg Barber	MLC for Northern Metropolitan	23 December 2010	28 September 2017	6 years, 279 days	2014	Ballieu 2010-2013
1	Greg Barber	MLC for Northern Metropolitan	23 December 2010	28 September 2017	6 years, 279 days	2014	Napthine 2013-2014
1	Greg Barber	MLC for Northern Metropolitan	23 December 2010	28 September 2017	6 years, 279 days	2014	Andrews 2014-2023
2	Samantha Ratnam	MLC for Northern Metropolitan	12 October 2017	23 April 2024	6 years, 194 days	2018, 2022	Andrews 2014-2023
2	Samantha Ratnam	MLC for Northern Metropolitan	12 October 2017	23 April 2024	6 years, 194 days	2018, 2022	Allan 2023-2026
3	Ellen Sandell	MLA for Melbourne	23 April 2024	Incumbent	2 years, 178 days	–	Allan 2023-2026
3	Ellen Sandell	MLA for Melbourne	23 April 2024	Incumbent	2 years, 178 days	–	Carroll 2026-

=== Western Australia ===
#	Leader	Electorate	Term start	Term end	Time in office	Elections contested	Premier (term)
1	Brad Pettitt	Western Australian Legislative Council	March 2025 (Note: Pettitt was elected as party leader sometime after the 2025 state election, the exact date is not public)	Incumbent	1 year, 224 days	–	Cook 2023–present

== See also ==
- Leaders of the Australian Labor Party
- Leader of the Liberal Party of Australia
