= Steph Hodgins-May =

Australian politician and climate activist (born 1985)

Senator Steph Hodgins-May
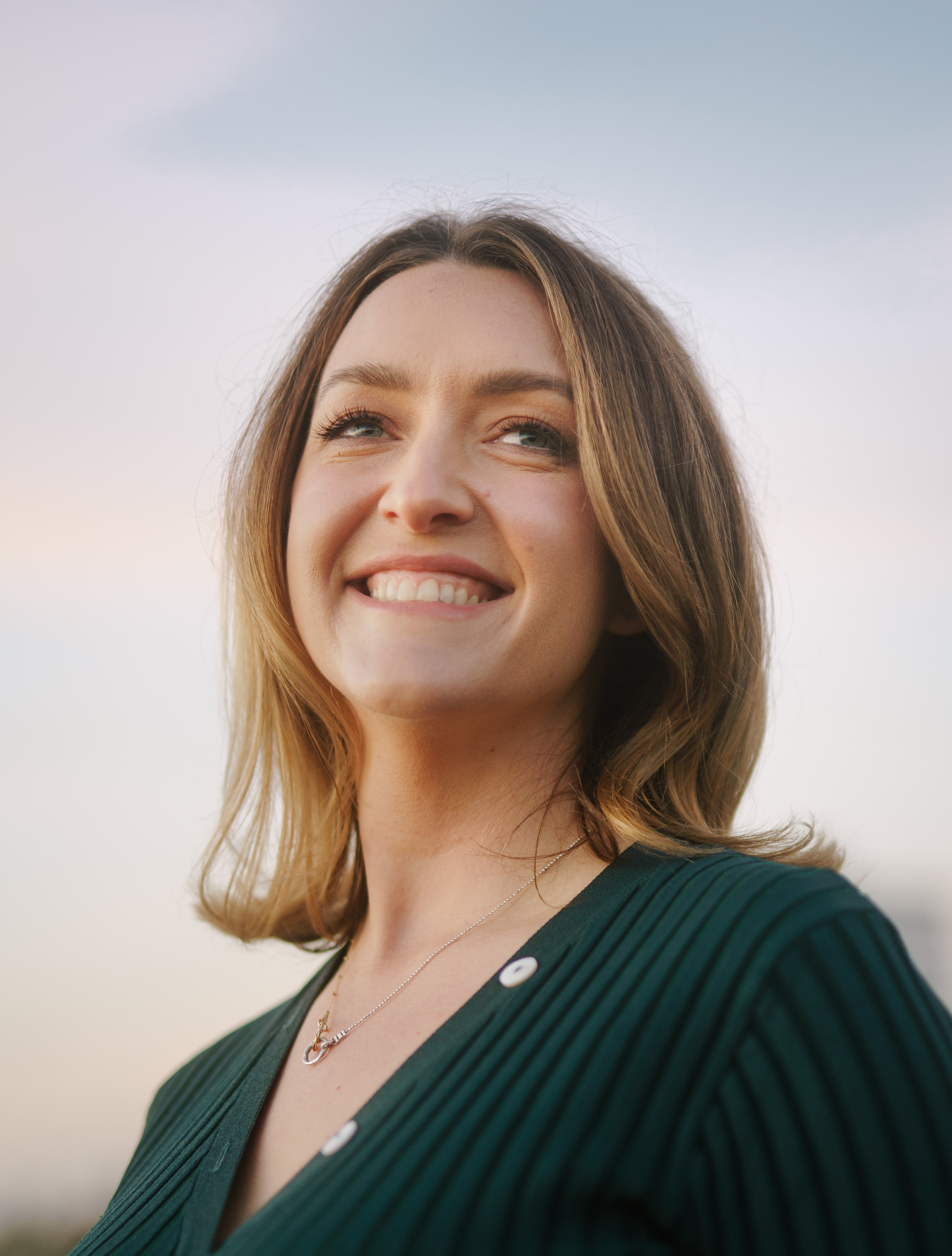
- Hodgins-May in 2023

Deputy Leader of the Australian Greens
- Incumbent
- Assumed office 30 September 2026
- Leader: David Shoebridge
- Preceded by: Mehreen Faruqi

Senator for Victoria
- Incumbent
- Assumed office 2 May 2024
- Preceded by: Janet Rice

Personal details
- Born: 23 August 1985 (age 41) Ballarat, Victoria, Australia
- Relations: William Hill (great-great-grandfather)
- Occupation: Political activist Lawyer
- Website: greens.org.au/vic/person/steph-hodgins-may

Steph Hodgins-May (born 23 August 1985) is an Australian politician and environmental lawyer. She was elected deputy leader of the Australian Greens since 30 September 2026. She has been a Senator for Victoria since 2024, representing the Greens. She was previously a Greens candidate for the House of Representatives on four occasions. Prior to entering parliament, she held roles with the United Nations and Greenpeace.

== Early life and education ==
Steph Hodgins-May was born on 23 August 1985 in Ballarat, Victoria. She was raised on a farm in Blampied in rural Victoria. Her father, Rod May, was a mayor of Hepburn Shire. Her mother was a media studies and drama teacher in Ballarat.

Hodgins-May is the great-great-granddaughter of William Hill, who was a founding member of the Country Party and a minister during the Bruce-Page government.

She has a Bachelor of Law, Bachelor of Arts, and Master in International Relations from Deakin University.

== Career ==
=== Early career ===
Hodgins-May worked in property law before working in the Australian mission to the United Nations. She was also her father's business partner in their family's farm.

Following the 2019 election, Hodgins-May took up a position as Greenpeace's Head of Pacific. In this position she pushed for Australia to do more to prevent climate change and to help the Pacific Islands with the challenges that climate change causes.

=== Political candidate ===
==== 2013 election ====
Hodgins-May first ran for elected office at the 2013 election for the division of Ballarat, a safe Labor seat. She won 9.5% of the vote.

==== 2016 election ====
At the 2016 election, Hodgins-May contested the inner Melbourne seat of Melbourne Ports, a seat held by Labor since 1906. In a three cornered contest between the Greens, Labor and Liberal, Hodgins-May secured 23.79% of the primary vote. The results of the election remained uncertain, with Hodgins-May closing in on the incumbent, Michael Danby with a strong preference flow. However, Danby received strong support in the postal votes, and was ahead by fewer than 1000 votes on the seventh count of preferences. Hodgins-May was eliminated at that point, and her preferences allowed Danby to prevail in the final count over the Liberal candidate, Owen Guest.

During the 2016 election campaign, Hodgins-May was invited with the other two major party candidates, Michael Danby and Owen Guest, to participate in a candidates' forum for the Jewish community, which makes up 9.9% of the division of Melbourne Ports. The event was co-sponsored by Zionism Victoria (ZV) and The Australian Jewish News (AJN). After initially accepting the invitation, Hodgins-May declined due to event co-sponsor Zionism Victoria calling the United Nations a “nuisance and sham organisation”.

Hodgins-May subsequently accepted a number of invitations to speak at a number of other Jewish organisations such as Mount Scopus, Habonim Dror, Jews for Refugees, and Limmud Oz.

==== 2019 election ====
Hodgins-May was the Greens candidate for the division of Macnamara, the renamed former Division of Melbourne Ports, for the 2019 federal election.

While campaigning for the election, Hodgins-May secured the endorsement of Gillian Triggs, who was the Australian human rights commissioner until 2017. The endorsement was a personal one and not an endorsement of the party as a whole. Triggs came under fire from both the Liberal and Labor parties for giving the endorsement.

While Hodgins-May increased her vote marginally, the new Labor candidate, Josh Burns increased his primary vote significantly, while the Liberal Party vote fell, meaning Burns won the seat comfortably.

==== 2022 election ====
Hodgins-May was again preselected for the Greens in the Melbourne seat of Macnamara for the 2022 election. It was one of the key seats that the Greens were targeting in their hopes of increasing their representation in parliament. Hodgins-May increased her primary vote and finished second in primary votes behind Labor.

=== Senator ===
In 2023, Hodgins-May was pre-selected by The Greens to replace Janet Rice upon Rice's retirement in the first half of 2024. She was appointed to the Senate in a joint sitting of the Parliament of Victoria on 1 May 2024.

In May 2026, Hodgins-May chaired a Senate Select Committee on the Taxation of Gas Resources having spearheaded much of the public campaign for a 25 per cent tax on gas exports alongside other prominent crossbenchers such as Senator David Pocock.

On 30 September 2026, in the Greens leadership election, following the resignation of leader Larissa Waters and deputy leader Mehreen Faruqi, Hodgins-May ran for deputy leader of the Australian Greens. She was elected 6–5 in a two-candidate vote against Tasmanian Senator Vanessa Bleyer. David Shoebridge was elected leader.

== Political positions ==
Hodgins-May has taken a strong stance on climate policy, and has called on successive governments to do more. She has argued that government inaction has caused Australia to become a global pariah when it came to issues around the environment.

She is also an advocate for Australia increasing its foreign aid budget and to focus more on international development.

== Personal life ==
As of 2021 Hodgins-May was living in the Melbourne suburb of Elwood with her partner Ogy Simic. She has a son. Simic, a lawyer, was elected to Port Phillip City Council in 2016 and stood for the Greens at the 2018 Victorian state election.

Hodgins-May's mother died in the 2009 Samoan tsunami while holidaying at a local resort. In 2017 her father, Rod May, was killed in a traffic collision. He was on a motorbike, while the driver of the car had methamphetamines in his system and was disqualified from driving at the time.
