= Larissa Waters =

Australian politician (born 1977)

Senator Larissa Waters
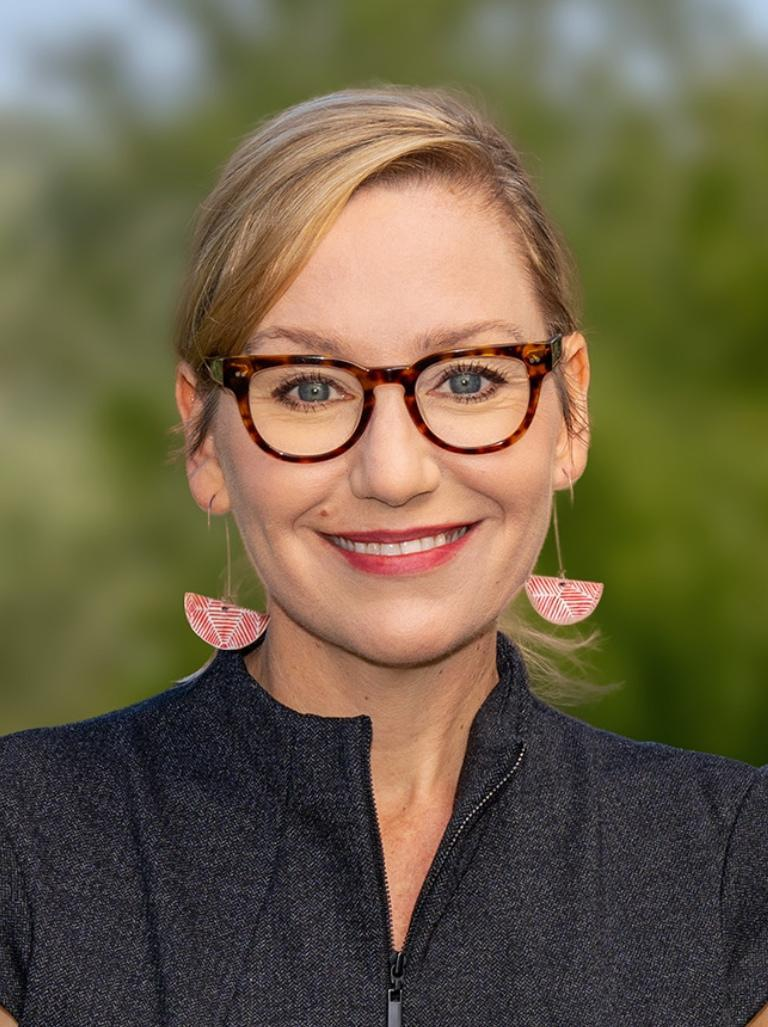
- Campaign portrait, 2025

Leader of the Australian Greens
- In office 15 May 2025 – 30 September 2026
- Deputy: Mehreen Faruqi
- Preceded by: Adam Bandt
- Succeeded by: David Shoebridge

Senator for Queensland
- Incumbent
- Assumed office 6 September 2018
- Preceded by: Andrew Bartlett
- In office 1 July 2011 – 18 July 2017
- Succeeded by: Andrew Bartlett
Party positions
Leader of the Greens in the Senate
In office 4 February 2020 – 15 May 2025
| Leader | Adam Bandt |
Co-Deputy Leader of the Australian Greens
In office 4 December 2018 – 10 June 2022 Serving with Nick McKim (2020–22); Adam Bandt (2018–20)
| Preceded by | Rachel Siewert |
| Succeeded by | Mehreen Faruqi |
In office 6 May 2015 – 18 July 2017 Serving with Scott Ludlam (until 14 July 2017)
| Leader | Richard Di Natale; Adam Bandt |
| Preceded by | Adam Bandt |
| Succeeded by | Adam Bandt and Rachel Siewert (acting) |

Personal details
- Born: Larissa Joy Waters; 8 February 1977 (age 49) Winnipeg, Manitoba, Canada
- Citizenship: Australia; Canada (until 2017)
- Party: Greens
- Education: Griffith University
- Occupation: Lawyer
- Website: greens.org.au/mps/larissa-waters
- Larissa Waters' voice Waters speaking about her reaction to the 2026 Australian federal budget

Larissa Joy Waters (born 8 February 1977) is an Australian politician and lawyer who served as leader of the Australian Greens from May 2025 to September 2026. She has served as a senator for Queensland since 2018 and from 2011 to 2017.

Waters was first elected as a Senator for Queensland in 2010 and took up her seat in 2011, she was forced to vacate the Senate in July 2017 in the parliamentary eligibility crisis, due to her holding Canadian citizenship in violation of Section 44 of the Constitution of Australia. Having renounced her Canadian citizenship, Waters was re-appointed to the Senate in 2018 by the Queensland Government to fill the casual vacancy created by the resignation of Senator Andrew Bartlett. She served as Greens co-deputy leader from May 2015 to July 2017 and again from December 2018 to June 2022, and as her party's Senate leader from February 2020. In May 2025, Waters was elected leader of the Australian Greens, following loss of the seat of Melbourne by then-leader Adam Bandt in the 2025 Australian federal election. On 28 September 2026 she resigned as leader due to health issues, at the same time announcing her intention to take medical leave from the Senate.

== Early life and education ==
Larissa Waters was born on 8 February 1977 in Winnipeg, Manitoba, Canada. Her Australian parents were in Canada working and studying, but the family left when Waters was an 11-month-old baby, and she grew up in Brisbane.

Waters attended a primary school in Rainworth and completed her secondary schooling at Kelvin Grove State High School.

She has a Bachelor of Science and a Bachelor of Laws from Griffith University and a Graduate Diploma in Legal Practice from the New South Wales College of Law. From 2000 to 2001, she was a legal researcher at the Queensland Land and Resources Tribunal (predecessor of the Land Court of Queensland), from 2001 to 2002 a lawyer at Freehills, and from 2002 to 2011 was a lawyer with the Environmental Defenders Office.

== Political career ==
Waters was the Greens' candidate in Brisbane Central at the 2006 Queensland state election, running unsuccessfully against incumbent premier Peter Beattie. She was the lead Senate candidate for the Greens in Queensland at the 2007 federal election. The party received 7.3 percent of the statewide vote (an increase of 1.9 points), but this was not enough to secure her election. Waters again stood for office at the 2009 Queensland state election, running for the seat of Mount Coot-tha. The seat was held by the sitting Treasurer of Queensland, Andrew Fraser of the Labor Party. She polled 23.1 percent on first preferences, with Ronan Lee (25.9 percent in Indooroopilly) the only Greens candidate with a higher percentage.

Waters was again placed first on the Greens' senate ticket at the 2010 federal election. She was elected with 12.8 per cent of the vote, an increase of 5.4 percentage points. In May 2015, Waters was elected to the Greens' "leadership triumvirate". She was made a "co-deputy leader" alongside Scott Ludlam, with Richard Di Natale replacing Christine Milne as the party leader. Waters was re-elected to the senate at the 2016 double-dissolution election, winning a three-year term with 6.9 percent of the vote.

=== Resignation ===
Waters was forced to resign from the Senate on 18 July 2017, after it was uncovered that she was a dual Canadian-Australian citizen, thereby making her ineligible to be elected under section 44 of the Australian Constitution. Her resignation came four days after her fellow Greens co-deputy leader Scott Ludlam had resigned from the Senate over dual citizenship, which prompted several other MPs and Senators to clarify their citizenship status. Waters stated that she had previously believed she was solely an Australian citizen, and if she had wished to gain Canadian citizenship she would have needed to take active steps before age 21, but had recently discovered she had in fact held dual citizenship since birth. Her seat was filled by a recount, which saw former Australian Democrats leader Andrew Bartlett, who held the second position after Waters on the Greens' 2016 Senate ticket in Queensland, return to the Senate.

On 8 August 2017, Waters announced that she had renounced her Canadian citizenship and declared her intent to stand for Greens preselection and return to parliament at the 2019 federal election. The High Court handed down its decision on 27 October 2017 and ruled that Waters was invalidly elected.

=== Return ===
On 3 April 2018, Waters was announced as the Queensland Greens lead Senate candidate for the 2019 federal election, with Andrew Bartlett instead opting to contest the lower house seat of Brisbane. On 16 June 2018, Bartlett announced that he would resign from the senate at the end of August, and Waters was preselected to fill the resulting casual vacancy ahead of the election. On 6 September 2018, the Parliament of Queensland re-appointed Waters to the Senate following her implication in the 2017 Parliamentary eligibility crisis. The Greens party room returned Waters to the co-deputy leadership on 4 December 2018.

Waters was re-elected as a Senator for Queensland at the 2019 federal election, where she received 9.9% of the state's vote, as well as a 3.12-point swing in her favour.

In February 2020, Greens leader Richard Di Natale resigned and was succeeded by Adam Bandt. Unlike his predecessors as Greens leader, including Di Natale, Bandt was a member of the House of Representatives and this resulted in Waters, as one of the co-deputy leaders, becoming the leader of the Greens in the Senate. This made her the second woman to lead the Greens in the Senate after Christine Milne.

In March 2021, Waters issued an apology to federal minister Peter Dutton for comments made on Twitter accusing him of being an "inhuman, sexist rape apologist". In her apology, Waters said that there was no basis for those allegations.

=== Leader of the Australian Greens ===
Waters became the leader of the Australian Greens following Adam Bandt's loss of the seat of Melbourne during the 2025 Australian federal election. Waters was selected from 11 other senators, including Mehreen Faruqi and Sarah Hanson-Young, who also ran for candidacy, and one lower-house MP.

As of May 2025, Waters is second-longest serving Greens senator in parliament, after Sarah Hanson-Young.

In October 2025, Waters said in an interview on the Insiders programme that she had condemned the Manchester synagogue attack, but stated that Australia's failure to sanction Israel was a cause for the massacre. She said that Australia should stop selling weapons components to Israel and impose sanctions because of its actions in Gaza. Shadow finance minister James Paterson said Waters comments were insensitive and offensive. Jewish Labor MP Josh Burns commented by saying that Waters' comments suggested "Jews across the world are legitimate targets because of the actions of the Israeli government".

On 28 September 2026 Waters announced her resignation from the party's leadership to recover from the symptoms of a preexisting kidney disease. She will also take medical leave from the Senate.

=== Political concerns ===
Waters' political concerns include environmental protection, gender equity, ending gender-based violence, and addressing the influence of large donations by corporations.

== Personal life ==
Waters has one child with journalist Brendan O'Malley, born in 2009. Waters and O'Malley separated in 2013. Waters has another child born in 2016, who was the first baby to be breastfed in the Senate chamber in 2017.

Party political offices
| Preceded by Adam Bandt | Leader of the Australian Greens; 2025–present | Incumbent |
