= David Shoebridge =

Australian politician (born 1971)

Senator David Shoebridge
- Campaign portrait, 2022

Leader of the Australian Greens
- Incumbent
- Assumed office 30 September 2026
- Deputy: Steph Hodgins-May
- Preceded by: Larissa Waters

Senator for New South Wales
- Incumbent
- Assumed office 1 July 2022
- Preceded by: Kristina Keneally

Member of the New South Wales Legislative Council
- In office 7 September 2010 – 11 April 2022
- Preceded by: Sylvia Hale
- Succeeded by: Sue Higginson

Deputy Mayor of Woollahra
- In office 13 September 2004 – 7 September 2005
- Mayor: Geoffrey Rundle
- Preceded by: Keri Huxley
- Succeeded by: Marcus Ehrlich

Councillor of Woollahra Municipal Council for Cooper Ward
- In office 27 March 2004 – 8 September 2012

Personal details
- Born: 17 September 1971 (age 55) Sydney, New South Wales, Australia
- Party: Greens
- Other political affiliations: Labor (briefly; mid 1990s)
- Education: University of Sydney
- Occupation: Barrister
- Website: greens.org.au/nsw/person/david-shoebridge

David Martin Shoebridge (born 17 September 1971) is an Australian politician and former barrister who is the leader of the Australian Greens. He has been a senator for New South Wales since 2022, and served in the New South Wales Legislative Council from 2010 to 2022 and on the Woollahra Municipal Council from 2004 to 2012.

== Early life and education ==
Shoebridge was born in Sydney on 17 September 1971, one of four children born to Ken and Janet Shoebridge. Shoebridge grew up in Wahroonga in Sydney's Upper North Shore, with his father working as a sales executive and later as a primary school teacher. His parents separated when he was 13; his father was physically and verbally abusive.

Shoebridge completed his secondary education at James Ruse Agricultural High School. He went on to the University of Sydney, completing a Bachelor of Arts in 1993 and a Bachelor of Laws with honours in 1995.

== Law career ==
Shoebridge was admitted as a lawyer in 1998, and was admitted to the New South Wales Bar in 2003. He started his professional career as an associate to Justice Eric Baker of the Family Court of Australia, from March 1996 to March 1998. He worked as a lawyer for 13 years, the majority of this time as a barrister with a focus on employment, discrimination, and tort law.

== Political career ==
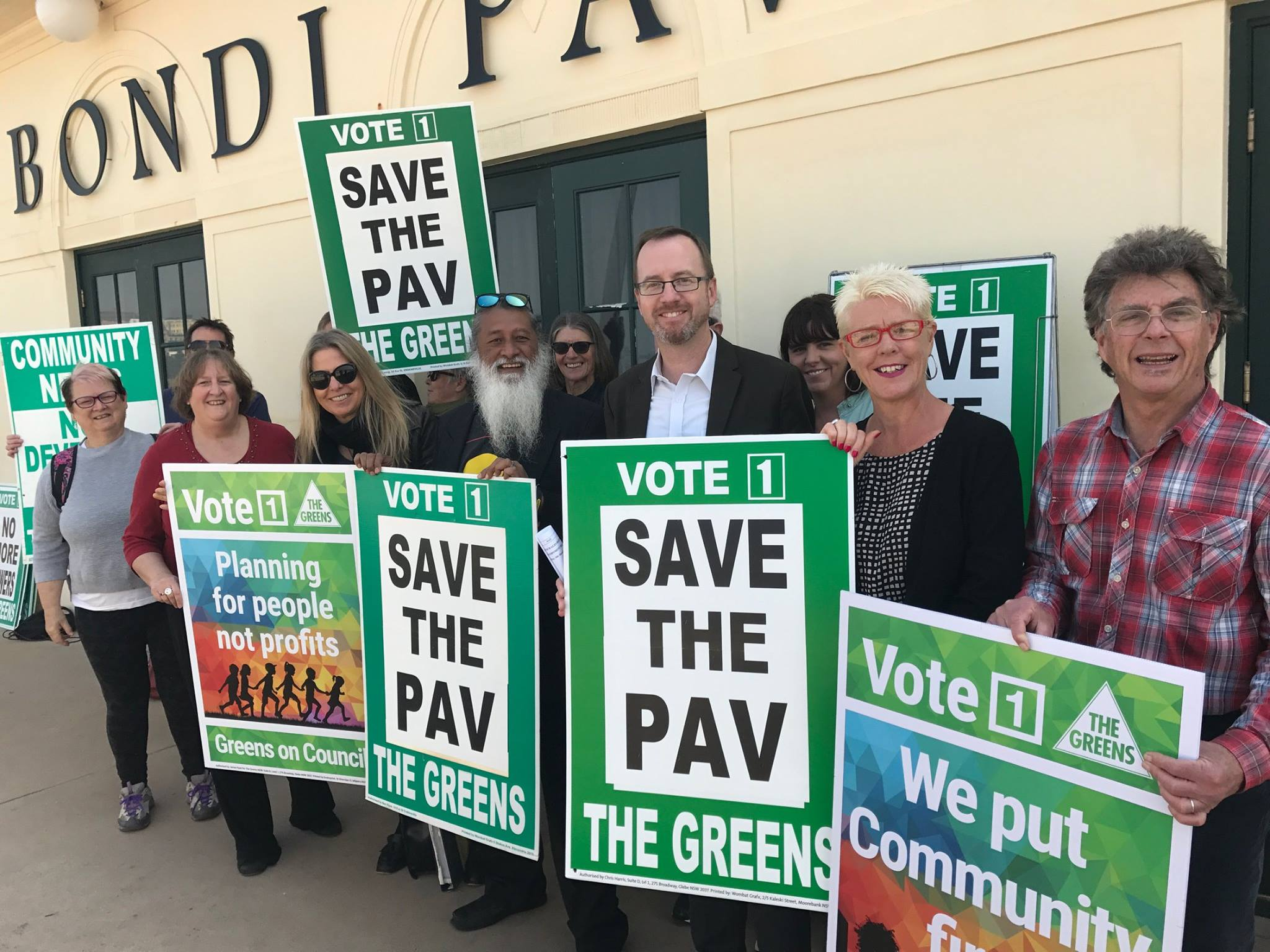
Shoebridge with Waverley Greens campaigning to save the Bondi Pavilion

Shoebridge was briefly a member of the Australian Labor Party in the mid-1990s. During that period, he was active in the Stanmore branch but was dissatisfied with the larger party's ignorance of the branch's progressive resolutions. During the early 2000s, he was sent by union clients to the Legislative Council to thwart Labor changes to workers' compensation laws. It was here that he met Lee Rhiannon, a representative of the New South Wales Greens.

=== Council politics ===
Shoebridge was elected to Woollahra Municipal Council in 2004 and reelected in 2008. After unsuccessfully running for the position of Deputy Mayor in April 2004 after his election, he served one term as Deputy Mayor of Woollahra from September 2004 to September 2005 under independent mayor, Geoffrey Rundle. He was an executive of the Local Government Association from 2008 to 2010 and an executive of the Holdsworth Community Centre in Woollahra from 2004 to 2008.

He was Convenor of the Greens NSW from August 2008 to August 2010. He was the Greens candidate for the state seat of Vaucluse in the 2007 state election.

=== State politics (2010–2022) ===
He became a member of the Legislative Council in September 2010 after Sylvia Hale resigned from the Legislative Council. He was elected as a member of the Legislative Council at the 2011 state election after being preselected to the first position on the Greens' ticket.

Shoebridge was the Chair of NSW Parliament's Public Accountability Committee, the Deputy Chair of the Portfolio Committee No. 5 – Legal Affairs, the Deputy Chair of the Select Committee on the High Level of First Nations People in Custody and Oversight and Review of Deaths in Custody, the Deputy Chair of the Select Committee on the Government's management of the Powerhouse Museum and other museums and cultural projects in New South Wales, a member of the Committee on Children and Young People, a member of the Portfolio Committee No. 3 – Education, a member of the Standing Committee on Law and Justice, a member of the Selection of Bills Committee and a member of the Select Committee on the impact of technological and other change on the future of work and workers in New South Wales.

Shoebridge has worked with victims of child sexual abuse. In September 2012 at a public meeting in Newcastle, Shoebridge joined journalist Joanne McCarthy and police whistleblower Peter Fox to call for a Royal Commission into sexual abuse by the Catholic Church and other institutions. A Royal Commission into Institutional Responses to Child Sexual Abuse was established in January 2013. Shoebridge has also introduced legislation in Parliament to overturn the Ellis defence, remove the statute of limitations and reform sentencing procedures related to child sex abuse.

On 2 June 2011, Shoebridge took the record for the longest speech in the NSW Legislative Council – while talking continuously for over five hours and 58 minutes against NSW government legislation that affected public sector wages and conditions. In 2012, Shoebridge advocated against proposed changes to workers' rights – as the NSW government made changes to the workers compensation system. Accompanied by the first general strike by fire-fighters since 1956, Shoebridge helped secure amendments to the legislation meaning that fire-fighters and paramedics retained the same cover as police officers.

Shoebridge campaigned successfully in July 2013 for the abolition of the Game Council NSW by the NSW government. This followed the findings and recommendations of the Dunn Report into the Game Council's governance, called after senior Game Council figures were suspended after allegations of illegal hunting.

In November 2013, Shoebridge moved the motion that established a Parliamentary Inquiry into the Bowraville murders. In November 2014 a unanimous report was handed down which made 15 recommendations including that the NSW Police Force reviews its processes, procedures and training programs that relate to Aboriginal people and that the NSW government reviews a relevant section of the Crimes (Appeal and Review) Act 2001. In May 2016, the then NSW Attorney-General sent an application for a retrial to the Court of Criminal Appeal. In November 2017 the Court of Criminal Appeal held four hearings into the case, and decided in 2018 against a retrial.

Shoebridge worked closely with community groups such as the Better Planning Network to force the then O'Farrell government to withdraw its planning reforms in November 2013.

In 2015, the Chinese consulate of Sydney warned members of parliament to not attend Shoebridge's briefing on human rights abuses in China's organ trade. In 2016, Shoebridge introduced a bill outlawing organ trade in New South Wales.

Starting in 2015 Shoebridge campaigned with community groups, residents and councillors across NSW against forced council amalgamations by the NSW Coalition government. Woollahra Council was a leader in the litigation against the NSW government – with the High Court granting it leave to appeal. In February 2017 the campaign had a major success with the Berejiklian government abandoning all pending forced amalgamations in the regions. In July 2017 the government backed down again abandoning all remaining council amalgamations in Sydney.

Shoebridge has campaigned on police accountability. In 2014, as part of a broader campaign to curb the use of police drug dogs, Shoebridge launched Facebook page Sniff Off with individuals reporting drug dog locations at train stations, festivals and other public places in NSW. Through freedom of information and questions in Parliament Shoebridge obtained data that indicates drug dogs get it wrong up to 80% of the time.

In 2017, Shoebridge and Lee Rhiannon, wrote an article for The Guardian in which they supported the establishment of the anti-capitalist Left Renewal faction in the NSW Greens. Former Left Renewal activists allege the organisation sought to support the offices of Shoebridge and Rhiannon, although they were both not members of the organisation. Tom Raue, one of Shoebridge's staffers, urged Greens' members to join Left Renewal, saying "our founding document explicitly mentions the anarchists and socialists that make up the party".

On 12 April 2018, Shoebridge successfully moved the motion in the NSW parliament to force the government to release its business case for the relocation of the Powerhouse Museum from Ultimo. In so doing, Shoebridge secured the support of MPs from Labor and other parties, as well as one Liberal MP.

On 15 May 2018, Shoebridge spoke at a pro-Palestinian rally, following the deaths of up to 60 Palestinians during the 2018 Gaza border protests.

In June 2020 a part-time member of Shoebridge's staff was charged with spray-painting "sovereignty never ceded" and "no pride in genocide" on a statue of James Cook in Hyde Park, Sydney outside of work hours. Shoebridge said he would not sack the staffer due to the actions being taken outside of work hours, and he was censured by the NSW Upper House for failing to condemn the act. Shoebridge condemned the public criticism on his staffer.

In 2020/2021, Shoebridge chaired a parliamentary inquiry to scrutinise the NSW government's grants under the Stronger Communities Grants Fund (in relation to which a senior member of Berejiklian's staff revealed to the inquiry that she most likely shredded and deleted documents relating to the Premier's approval of grants) as well as grants under the Bushfire Relief Fund (under the first round of which Blue Mountains received zero dollars).

=== Federal politics (2022–present) ===
In March 2021, Shoebridge won preselection as the lead candidate on the Greens' Senate ticket in New South Wales at the 2022 federal election. He resigned from the Legislative Council on 11 April 2022 prior to the close of nominations for the federal election. He was subsequently elected to a six-year Senate term beginning on 1 July 2022. At a Greens party room meeting on 16 June 2022, leader Adam Bandt announced the portfolio allocations, where Shoebridge was given three portfolios: Justice, Defence and Veteran's Affairs, and Digital Rights.

In September 2023, Shoebridge joined a cross-party delegation of Australian MPs to Washington, D.C., to lobby the U.S. Department of Justice to abandon its attempts to extradite Australian publisher Julian Assange from the United Kingdom. The other members were Alex Antic, Barnaby Joyce, Monique Ryan, Peter Whish-Wilson and Tony Zappia.

In July 2024, The Sydney Morning Herald wrote that current and former staff members of Shoebridge participated in the organisation of pro-Palestinian protests outside the offices of Federal MPs.

In August 2025, the Greens urged the Albanese government to impose direct sanctions on high-ranking members of Netanyahu's government and to stop supplying parts for the F-35 fighter aircraft to the global supply chain that can be accessed by Israel. Shoebridge said: "If the Albanese government stopped the export of F-35 fighter jet parts to Israel, then their F-35 fleet would be grounded."

In September 2025, Shoebridge said that Australia should apply the same sanctions against Israel as it did against Russia, criticising the Albanese government for "gaslighting the Australian public about its role in the genocide and its legal responsibilities to prevent it."

==== Greens leader ====
On 30 September 2026 Shoebridge was elected leader of the Australian Greens after Larissa Waters resigned as party leader over health concerns. This was after a three-way party vote, the other candidates being Mehreen Faruqi and Sarah Hanson-Young. He ran a joint ticket with Steph Hodgins-May, who replaced Faruqi as deputy leader of the Greens.

On 27 October 2026, Shoebridge announced a $21-a-week taxcut as well as a welfare boost during a speech at the National Press Club. This follows his vow to replace Labor as the major left-wing party.

In October 2026, Shoebridge announced Senator Jordon Steele-John was taking leave after Steele-John was accused of sexual harassment. The Greens established an internal investigation into the allegations.

== Political positions ==
Shoebridge is a supporter of the legalisation of cannabis nationally in Australia.

Shoebridge opposes military aid to Ukraine during the Russia-Ukraine war, unless approved by the United Nations Security Council (of which Russia has veto power). His stance has been criticised by Ukrainian-Australian groups, Ukrainian ambassador to Australia Vasyl Myroschnychenko, and by the Green Party of Ukraine. Shoebridge responded in his speech at the National Press Club that the Greens are committed to "peace and non-violence" but still support the people of Ukraine.

== Personal life ==
Shoebridge lives in the Sydney suburb of Woollahra. He has two daughters with his partner Patricia. He founded the Greens Bushwalking Club (with the assistance of the National Parks Association).

Civic offices
Preceded by Keri Huxley	Deputy Mayor of Woollahra; 2004–2005	Succeeded by Marcus Ehrlich
New South Wales Legislative Council
Preceded by Sylvia Hale	Member of the New South Wales Legislative Council; 2010–2022	Succeeded by Sue Higginson
Parliament of Australia
Preceded by Kristina Keneally	Senator for New South Wales; 2022–present	Incumbent
