= Sarah Hanson-Young =

Australian politician (born 1981)

Senator Sarah Hanson-Young
- Hanson-Young in 2025

Senator for South Australia
- Incumbent
- Assumed office 1 July 2008
- Preceded by: Natasha Stott Despoja

Personal details
- Born: Sarah Coral Hanson; 23 December 1981 (age 44) Melbourne, Victoria, Australia
- Party: Greens
- Spouse: Zane Young (m. 2002; div. 2011) Ben Oquist (m. 2022)
- Children: 1
- Education: University of Adelaide (BSS)
- Website: sarahhansonyoung.com

Sarah Coral Hanson-Young (née Hanson; born 23 December 1981) is an Australian politician who has been a Senator for South Australia since July 2008, representing the Australian Greens.

Upon her election, Hanson-Young was the youngest woman to be elected to federal parliament, winning election at the age of 25 and taking office at the age of 26. Charlotte Walker broke this record when she was elected in 2025, aged 21.

== Early life and education ==
Hanson-Young was born in Melbourne, and grew up near Orbost in East Gippsland. In 1999 she was awarded the Australia Day Young Citizen of the Year award for Gippsland, Victoria.

She graduated from the University of Adelaide with a Bachelor of Social Sciences in 2002. While studying, she was Environment Officer from 2001 to 2002, and then President from 2002 to 2003, of the Students' Association of the University of Adelaide.

== Career ==
In 2004, Hanson-Young worked as a bank teller. From 2004, until she took parliamentary office in 2008, she worked for Amnesty International as Campaign Manager for South Australia and the Northern Territory.

In 2006, she was studying for a postgraduate law degree.

Prior to her entry into politics, she also worked as media advisor to Mark Parnell (SA Greens) in the 2006 South Australian election and was a campaigner with Justice for Refugees (SA).

=== Political career ===
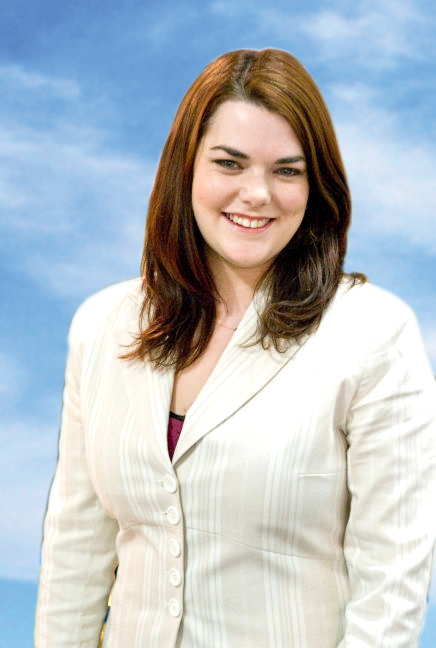
Hanson-Young in 2009

Hanson-Young was a candidate for the South Australian Legislative Council in the 2006 state election, ranked fourth on the Greens' ticket.

Hanson-Young was elected senator for South Australia at the 2007 federal election. She was the first Greens senator to be elected in that state and, at 25, the youngest person popularly elected to the Australian Senate, as well as the youngest woman elected to the Australian parliament. Natasha Stott Despoja was younger at her first sitting, but older at the time of her election. Although the South Australian Green primary vote remained relatively unchanged, preferences from the Australian Labor Party provided the required quota to elect a Greens senator.

Hanson-Young became the focus of attention on 18 June 2009, when the Senate President ordered the removal of her two-year-old daughter from the Senate chamber during a division. The rules of parliament at the time did not allow for senators or members to bring their children into the chamber. Public reaction to the situation was divided, and it ignited a debate on accommodating children and their carers in the workplace. Despite a delay of seven years, the incident led directly to a change in the rules of both the House of Representatives and Senate, to allow MPs and senators to care for their children in the chamber for short periods.

Hanson-Young challenged Christine Milne for the Green deputy leadership in October 2010 but was unsuccessful. Hanson-Young was critical of the Greens supporting the minority Labor Gillard government, and wanted the party to negotiate with the Liberal Party. However, plans for negotiations were stopped by Milne.

Following the resignation of Australian Greens leader Bob Brown in 2012, she was again nominated for the deputy leadership but lost to Adam Bandt by an undisclosed margin. Hanson-Young was re-elected to the Senate at the 2013 federal election and again at the 2016 double dissolution election.

In December 2013, Hanson-Young, along with Senators Louise Pratt (ALP) and Sue Boyce (LNP) established a cross-party working group on marriage equality.

In August 2016, Hanson-Young was replaced as the Greens' Immigration spokesperson by Nick McKim. She retained the senior portfolio areas of education and finance.

Hanson-Young won a further six-year senate term in the 2019 federal election, with her party receiving 10.9% of first preference votes, as well as a 5.03-point swing in her favour.

Hanson-Young is the Greens spokesperson for arts & communications, and the environment & water.

In 2020, Hanson-Young nominated for the second deputy leadership but lost to Nick McKim.

Hanson-Young was elected as Manager of Greens Business following the 2025 Australian Federal Election.

As of 2026, Hanson-Young is the party’s longest-serving federal MP.

=== Defamation case ===
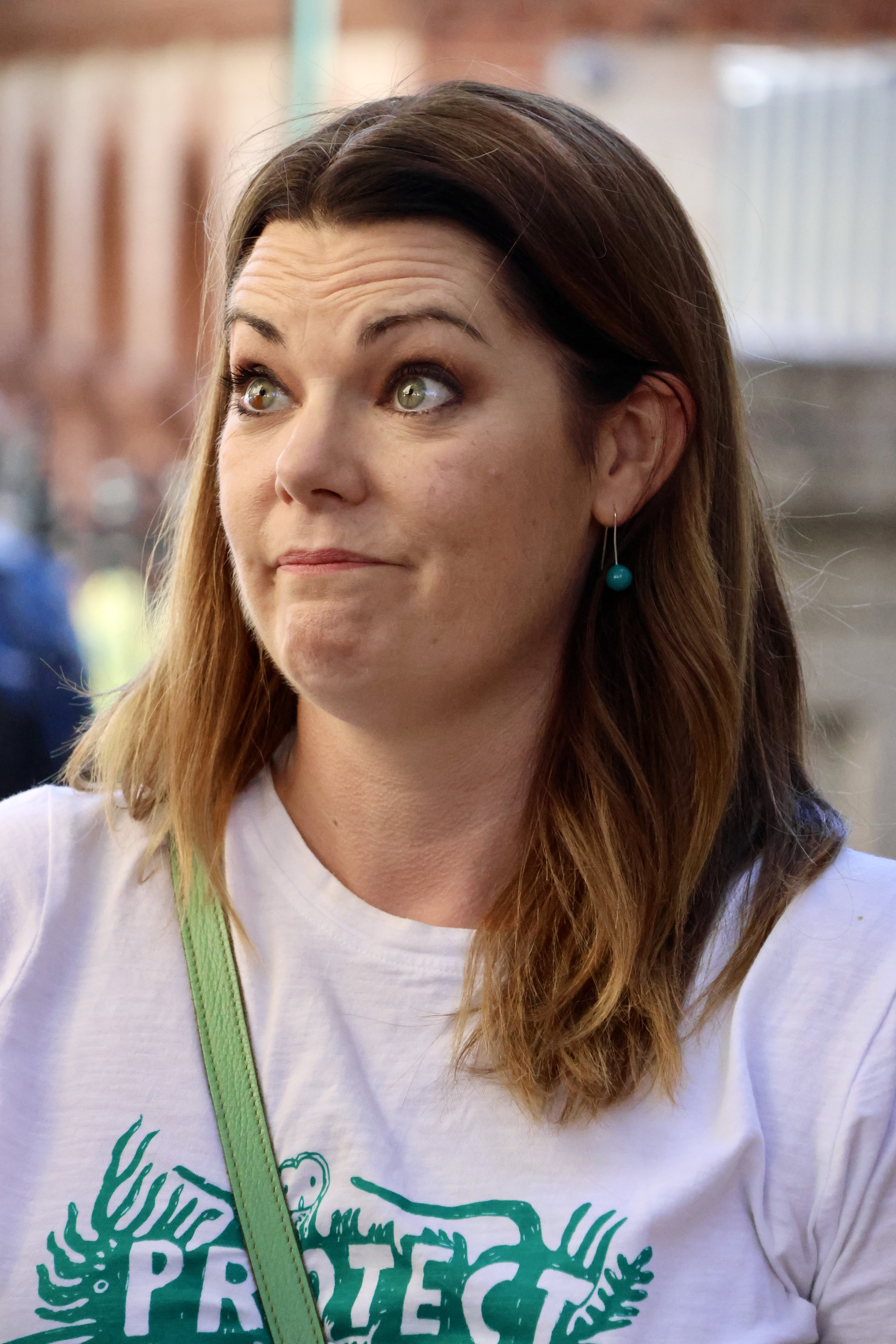
Hanson-Young in 2025

In July 2018, Liberal Democrats senator David Leyonhjelm suggested Hanson-Young should "stop shagging men", during a parliamentary debate on women's safety, in response to a parliamentary interjection by Hanson-Young which Leyonhjelm interpreted as her labelling "all men being rapists". Hanson-Young had described the idea of all men being rapists as "absurd". In response to Leyonhjelm's interjection, Hanson-Young called Leyonhjelm a "creep" before he told her to "fuck off". Hanson-Young called for Leyonhjelm to resign after Leyonhjelm refused to apologise and commenced crowd fundraising to pay for legal proceedings to sue him for defamation, claiming that any damages awarded would be donated to charity.

On 14 August 2018, the Greens moved a motion in the Senate to censure Leyonhjelm for his remarks against Hanson-Young which passed 30–28. In the defamation court case, Derryn Hinch gave evidence that Hanson-Young had said "women would not need protection" (in the forms proposed by the bill) "if men stopped raping women", and that this did not mean all men raped women. In 2019, Court Justice Richard White ruled in favour of Hanson-Young, awarding her $120,000 in damages.

=== Travel entitlement controversies ===
In December 2025, Hanson-Young was the subject of media attention over her use of parliamentary travel entitlements. Initial scrutiny focused on her billing taxpayers almost $3000 for return flights from Adelaide to the Gold Coast for herself and a family member, as well as two nights’ accommodation in Byron Bay, to attend the Bluesfest music festival in April 2025.

It was revealed that Hanson-Young had charged taxpayers almost $50,000 for 78 flights for her husband Ben Oquist to travel to and from Canberra where he works as a political lobbyist for DPG Advisory Solutions representing some of Australia's largest corporations. During the controversy, Hanson-Young cancelled her regular scheduled appearance on Sky TV. Amid the spate of travel entitlements media stories in December 2025 involving multiple MPs from a range of parties, Labor and Coalition MPs said Hanson-Young's use of family reunion entitlements appeared to be the worst example. Hanson-Young charged the taxpayer for more than 100 family flights since 2022.

== Published works ==
- Hanson-Young, Sarah (2018). En Garde. Melbourne, Vic: Melbourne University Press. ISBN 978-0-5228750-2-7.

== Personal life ==
Hanson-Young was married to former local government councillor Zane Young. The couple had one child and divorced in 2011.

In April 2022, she married Ben Oquist who works as a political lobbyist for DPG Advisory Solutions. DPG Advisory clients include Rio Tinto, the Port of Newcastle, Uber, supermarkets conglomerate Wesfarmers, Spotify, other large corporations, and some smaller NGOs. Ben Oquist is the former director of progressive think-tank The Australia Institute. She was criticised for using parliamentary travel privileges to fund her husband’s work-related travel.
