= Socialism in Australia =

Socialism in Australia dates back at least as far as the late-19th century. Notions of socialism in Australia have taken many different forms including utopian nationalism in the style of Edward Bellamy, the democratic socialist and social democratic electoral project of the Australian Labor Party (ALP), and the revolutionary Marxism of parties such as the Communist Party of Australia.

== History ==
=== Pre-Federation ===
Pre-federation Australian socialism was highly influenced by philosophical ideologies arising from the United States and the United Kingdom. Social scientists who had visited Australia at the time noted the lack of influence from continental socialist ideologies such as Marxism, labelling Australia as having "socialism with no doctrine". In particular, the works of the American author Edward Bellamy were highly influential, which advocated for the democratic nationalisation of all industry. The prominent Australian Socialist League was by the 1890s "modelled on, of all things, Daniel De Leon's Socialist Labor party". Due to the significant influence of American socialist writers, the political sociologist Robin Archer considered that pre-federation "Australian leftism was more American than American leftism itself".

==== Socialist colonies ====
In the late 1890s, the colonies of Cosme and New Australia were founded in South America by groups of Australian socialists.

The settlement of New Australia was founded in 1893 by the supporters of the utopian socialist William Lane. Lane's socialism was inspired by Edward Bellamy as well as his unorthodox belief that race played a role in preventing a socialist society from forming. Due to these beliefs, New Australia was built around the values of creating "a brotherhood of English-speaking Whites" which preserved the "colour-Line" which was seen as necessary in order to achieve communism. After conflict over Lane's supposed incompetent management, 58 colonists left New Australia in 1894 to found the colony of Cosme several kilometres south, and the original colony was soon after dissolved.

Founding of the Australian Labor Party

The predecessors to the then-democratic socialist Australian Labor Party were founded throughout the 1890s, with Labor formed through the merger of various unions and socialist parties. The ALP briefly took power at the state level in Queensland in 1899 - the first socialist government in the world at any level.

=== Post-Federation ===
==== Unions ====
The Waterside Workers' Federation of Australia was led by several Communist Party members during its history, such as Jim Healy. Under Healy, the Workers Federation went on strike in 1938 to prevent pig iron being shipped to Japan, to protest the invasion of China. In 1945, the union declared a ban on working Dutch ships, labelled the "Black Armada", during the Indonesian National Revolution.

Socialism was a major ideology behind the Builders Labourers Federation and the green bans in the 1970s. The Victorian branch of the union was primarily led by members of the Maoist CPA (M-L) such as Norm Gallagher, while the New South Wales branch was led by members of the Communist Party of Australia (CPA) such as Jack Mundey. In 1974, Gallagher and several affiliated Maoist workers occupied the New South Wales branch office and expelled CPA-affiliated unionists. After union officials, including CPA members, agreed upon the Prices and Incomes Accord in 1983 which traded lower rates of industrial action for parliamentary reforms, it signalled "the end of the renegade, guerrilla actions of the BLF to stop work and take radical protest activities". The union was de-registered shortly afterwards, during the Hawke Labor government, and members were blacklisted from working on construction sites.

==== Australian Labor Party ====
A number of socialists have been influential figures in ALP history. Notable among them was John Curtin (Prime Minister of Australia), Jim Cairns (the Deputy Prime Minister of Australia under Gough Whitlam), Jack Lang (the radical Premier of New South Wales), Tom Uren, Eddie Ward, and many early figures in Labor history, including James Scullin and Ted Theodore, who introduced Labor's socialist objective. Labor has undertaken some democratic socialist measures during its times in government, as well as many more decidedly free market measures since the Hawke government. Ben Chifley famously attempted to nationalise Australian banks in the 1940s, a policy of the party only dropped in the 1970s.

Under Jack Lang during the Great Depression, the New South Wales branch of the Labor Party came to be dominated by the left wing. Socialisation units were established in party branches, advocating for the Labor government to begin to nationalise industry and abolish private property. Revolutionary elements were prominent; a sub-committee was established to produce strategies of socialism, producing the Payne Report. "The Payne Report was a bombshell within the units and within the party. It called for "social revolution, which means... complete destruction of the capitalist state apparatus... a dictatorship of the working class" following a "revolutionary conflict between the classes". If it remained vague on key points, it was nonetheless the clearest statement ever produced by the socialisation units of a revolutionary strategy for socialism..."

Some recent, dissident figures in the party have attempted to pursue a more interventionist, democratic socialist agenda; Keating government minister Peter Baldwin ran on a Bennite programme, in which, "He promised to revive the “dead letter” of the ALP’s commitment to socializing the means of production by advocating for the nationalization of industry as part of the next Labor government’s program. He argued that industrial democracy would be crucial to this goal."

Some parts of the Labor Left continue to advocate for socialism. For example, the NSW Young Labor Left state on their website: "We believe in participatory and representative democracy; trade unionism and workers’ control of industry; the abolition of exploitation for private profit; the implementation of the ALP’s socialist objective; environmentalism and sustainability; as well as feminism, queer rights, and First Nations justice." Their policy proposals include support for an Australian Green New Deal, prison abolition, public ownership of industry, industrial democracy, and Labor Party democracy.

==== Social cohesion ====
In 1973, when the Black Community School was set up in Townsville, North Queensland by Eddie Mabo for the education of local aboriginal and Torres Strait islander children, Tom Aikens of the North Queensland Labor Party questioned if those responsible for the school were the group known as the "Red Element" (i.e. Communists) at James Cook University, and if they were "diverting Commonwealth funds to maintain it."

=== Contemporary era ===
Following the collapse of the communism in Europe from 1989 to 1991, belief in socialism collapsed, resulting in the fall of the Communist Party of Australia and the shift of Labor Left towards non-socialist ideologies. The Communist Party of Australia was dissolved and the assets of the Communist Party were thereafter directed into the SEARCH Foundation, a not-for-profit company set up in 1990 "to preserve and draw on the resources of the Communist Party of Australia and its archives."

During the fall of the Communist Party, several organisations and individuals moved toward the Greens movement. Several ex-Communist Party and Labor Left members joined the Greens NSW, inspired by the green ban movement. In Western Australia, members of the Alternative Coalition (consisting of members from the Communist Party of Australia, the Socialist Party of Australia, and the Democratic Socialist Party) merged with the Nuclear Disarmament Party to form Greens Western Australia. An Alternative Coalition member, Christabel Chamarette, later became senator in 1992. The Democratic Socialist Party established "Greens Alliance" parties in South Australia, Victoria, and the Australian Capital Territory. However, in 1992 following the formation of the Australian Greens federation, the DSP was proscribed and members were banned from entering the Green parties. The new Green parties were broad-left coalition, with the founding documents of the Sydney Greens stating:

The Greens in Sydney come from many backgrounds. Environmental and resident activists. Nuclear disarmers. Dissidents from the Labor Party who have witnessed betrayals by both wings of that party. Feminists. Anarchists. Those inspired by the German Greens. Socialists of various kinds. What is distinctive and unifying about this new force in Sydney is the emphasis on encouraging people’s self-confidence in their right to have their say, their right to democratically determine matters – whether they are large or small – which affect their lives.

In 1996 the Socialist Party of Australia, a splinter party from the CPA, changed its name to the Communist Party of Australia claiming the party was the rightful successor to the original party formed in 1920.

In 2001, several socialist organisations formed Socialist Alliance in an attempt for left unity. The organisations at foundation included the Democratic Socialist Perspective, International Socialist Organisation, Freedom Socialist Party, Socialist Alternative, Socialist Democracy, Worker-communist Party of Iraq, Workers League, Worker's Liberty, and Worker's Power. However, after several years, most affiliate organisations abandoned the Alliance. In January 2010, the last major organisation in the Alliance, the Democratic Socialist Perspective, voted to merge into the Socialist Alliance, in effect ceasing to exist as an affiliate organisation.

== Socialist organisations in Australia ==
Political historian Geoff Robinson describes the contemporary left as a "movement of parties and electoral campaigning". There are currently two federally registered socialist parties which run in elections: the Socialist Alliance and the Victorian Socialists. Although Socialist Action and the Communist Party of Australia are not registered for federal elections, they have successfully contested local government elections in the City of Yarra and the City of Auburn. There are several organisations and parties which do not run in elections, either for ideological reasons or due to practical reasons, including the Communist Party of Australia (Marxist–Leninist), Socialist Alternative, and Solidarity.

=== Eco-socialism ===
==== Australian Greens ====
While not strictly having a socialist platform the Greens have elected socialists, including Lee Rhiannon and Max Chandler-Mather.

Left Renewal was established as a eco-socialist political faction of the NSW Greens in 2016.

==== SEARCH Foundation ====
Formed in 1990 as the successor organisation of the Communist Party of Australia.

=== Marxism–Leninism ===
==== Communist Party of Australia (Marxist–Leninist) ====
In 1961, the pro-China faction leader Ted Hill was expelled from the Communist Party of Australia during the events of the split between the USSR and China. Hill in the following years led a split from the party which cumulated in the formation of the Maoist Communist Party of Australia (Marxist–Leninist).

==== Communist Party of Australia (1971–present) ====
In 1971, a group split from the Communist Party of Australia due to the party criticising actions of the Soviet Union, and formed the Socialist Party of Australia. In 1996, following the dissolution of the original Communist Party of Australia in 1991, the Socialist Party of Australia re-named itself to the Communist Party of Australia.

==== Australian Communist Party ====
In 2019, the Australian Communist Party split from the Communist Party of Australia due to disagreements surrounding united front tactics and relations with the Australian Labor Party. It operated the Community Union Defence League, a mutual aid organisation founded in 2016. The Community Union Defence League announced in 2026 that it would shut down operations in every state but Queensland. Later in 2026, the Australian Communist Party rebranded to the Republican Workers Party.

==== Red Anti-Imperialist Collective (Red Ant) ====
Red Anti-Imperialist Collective (formally "Red Ant Collective") is a Marxist–Leninist organization focused around anti-imperialism. Red Ant Collective was initially founded in 2022, by former members of Socialist Alternative, who later formed a breakaway group in 2025 called Red Spark.

==== Association for a Revolutionary Australia ====
The Association for a Revolutionary Australia (ARA) is a Marxist–Leninist, New Democratic and Left-wing nationalist organisation founded by former members of the Australian Communist Party. In June 2025, the Communist Party of Australia (Marxist–Leninist) expressed solidarity with ARA, which was called the Eureka Initiative at the time. ARA is a member organisation of the New Democratic Front of Australia and has participated in running CUDL-affliated street kitchens.

=== Trotskyism ===
==== Socialist Alternative ====
Formed in 1995 by expelled members of the International Socialist Organisation. In 2018, Alternative formed an electoral alliance with Socialist Alliance, forming the Victorian Socialists.

==== Socialist Equality Party ====
Initially formed in 1972 as the Socialist Labour League. In 2010, the SLL was refounded as the Socialist Equality Party.

==== Solidarity ====
Initially formed in 1971 as the Marxist Workers' Group, then later the International Socialist Organisation. In 1995 several members were expelled and formed Socialist Alternative. In 2008, the ISO merged with several other parties to form Solidarity.

=== Other ===
==== Communist Party of Australia (1920–1991) ====
The Australian Communist Party was initially established in 1920. Within the decade the party became aligned with the Soviet Communist International and renamed itself to the Communist Party of Australia. Following the 1930s, the party followed Marxist-Leninism, until the party became increasingly critical of the USSR in the 1960s. In 1967 the party ceased receiving funding from the USSR and from the 1970s onwards the party adopted eurocommunist theories. The Communist Party of Australia dissolved in 1991. The SEARCH Foundation was established as a successor organisation.

==== Socialist Alliance ====
Initially formed in 2001 by several socialist organisations in an attempt for left unity. However, by 2010, most constituent parties had left and the last major organisation in the Alliance, the ex-Trotskyist Democratic Socialist Perspective voted to merge into the Socialist Alliance.

==== Socialist Labor Party ====
Initially formed in 1887 as the Australian Socialist League. In 1901, the ASL formed the Socialist Labor Party to contest the 1901 Australian federal election. Between the late 1890s and 1905, the party shifted towards De Leonism. The party declined after the 1920s, however, the party maintained its newspaper The People until the early 1970s where it then ceased its activities.

==== Australian Socialist Party ====
The Socialist Party is a democratic socialist party established in 2018 as 'Victorian Socialists'. Beginning in 2025, branches were established in every state and major territory. The party is an electoral alliance of various socialist parties, organisations, community groups and trade unionists.

==== Communist Unity ====
Communist Unity (previously called the Revolutionary Communist Organisation) is a multi-tendency pre-party formation based around programmatic unity. The group was founded in January 2023. In January 2026, the RCO merged with the Spartacist League of Australia and adopted its current name. Communist Unity participates in the Australian Socialist Party as part of the Communist Caucus.

== See also ==
- Anarchism in Australia
- Australian Labor Party
- Communist Party of Australia
- Conservatism in Australia
- Economic history of Australia
- Feminism in Australia
- Liberalism in Australia
- List of political parties in Australia
- Politics of Australia
- Socialism in New Zealand
