= Electoral results for the district of Ballina =

Election results for Ballina, New South Wales, Australia

Ballina, an electoral district of the Legislative Assembly in the Australian state of New South Wales, was established in 1894. In 1904 it was abolished and replaced by Byron. It was re-established in 1988, largely replacing Lismore.

Election	Member	Party
1894	John Perry	Protectionist
1895	John Perry	Protectionist
1898	John Perry	Protectionist
1901	John Perry	Progressive
Election	Member	Party
1988	Don Page	National
1991	Don Page	National
1995	Don Page	National
1999	Don Page	National
2003	Don Page	National
2007	Don Page	National
2011	Don Page	National
2015	Tamara Smith	Greens
2019	Tamara Smith	Greens
2023	Tamara Smith	Greens

== Election results ==
=== 2023 ===
2023 New South Wales state election: Ballina
Party	Candidate	Votes	%	±%
Greens	Tamara Smith	16,792	35.2	+4.0
National	Josh Booyens	14,535	30.4	−7.0
Labor	Andrew Broadley	10,880	22.8	−2.2
Independent	Kevin Loughrey	3,710	7.8	+7.8
Sustainable Australia	Peter Jenkins	1,822	3.8	+1.6
Total formal votes		47,739	97.0	−0.3
Informal votes		1,455	3.0	+0.3
Turnout		49,194	83.4	−3.7
Notional two-party-preferred count
Labor	Andrew Broadley	22,445	56.2	+2.3
National	Josh Booyens	17,492	43.8	−2.3
Two-candidate-preferred result
Greens	Tamara Smith	23,897	57.7	+2.9
National	Josh Booyens	17,506	42.3	−2.9
Greens hold		Swing	+2.9	

=== Elections in the 2010s ===
==== 2019 ====
2019 New South Wales state election: Ballina
Party	Candidate	Votes	%	±%
National	Ben Franklin	18,550	37.01	+0.36
Greens	Tamara Smith	15,895	31.71	+4.69
Labor	Asren Pugh	12,457	24.85	+0.12
Animal Justice	Cathy Blasonato	1,256	2.51	+2.51
Sustainable Australia	Lisa McDermott	1,119	2.23	+2.23
Keep Sydney Open	James Wright	850	1.70	+1.70
Total formal votes		50,127	97.36	−0.29
Informal votes		1,359	2.64	+0.29
Turnout		51,486	86.78	−1.65
Two-party-preferred result
Labor	Asren Pugh	23,657	54.31	+1.28
National	Ben Franklin	19,904	45.69	−1.28
Two-candidate-preferred result
Greens	Tamara Smith	24,645	55.42	+2.26
National	Ben Franklin	19,824	44.58	−2.26
Greens hold		Swing	+2.26	

==== 2015 ====
2015 New South Wales state election: Ballina
Party	Candidate	Votes	%	±%
National	Kris Beavis	17,392	36.6	−19.6
Greens	Tamara Smith	12,824	27.0	+4.5
Labor	Paul Spooner	11,738	24.7	+12.8
Independent	Jeff Johnson	3,708	7.8	+7.8
Independent	Matthew Hartley	826	1.7	+1.7
Christian Democrats	Vyvyan Stott	679	1.4	−0.5
No Land Tax	Greg Zylber	291	0.6	+0.6
Total formal votes		47,458	97.7	+0.0
Informal votes		1,141	2.3	−0.0
Turnout		48,599	88.4	+2.0
Notional two-party-preferred count
Labor	Paul Spooner	21,484	53.0	+27.7
National	Kris Beavis	19,031	47.0	−27.7
Two-candidate-preferred result
Greens	Tamara Smith	21,528	53.1	+20.1
National	Kris Beavis	18,996	46.9	−20.1
Greens gain from National		Swing	+20.1	

==== 2011 ====
2011 New South Wales state election: Ballina
Party	Candidate	Votes	%	±%
National	Don Page	24,054	57.0	+2.6
Greens	Simon Richardson	9,159	21.7	+2.3
Labor	Toby Warnes	5,033	11.9	−11.2
Independent	Karin Kolbe	2,296	5.4	+5.4
Christian Democrats	Bruce Kemp	847	2.0	+2.0
Family First	Nathan Willis	835	2.0	+2.0
Total formal votes		42,224	97.9	−0.6
Informal votes		886	2.1	+0.6
Turnout		43,110	89.0	−0.9
Notional two-party-preferred count
National	Don Page	26,672	75.2	+10.7
Labor	Toby Warnes	8,814	24.8	−10.7
Two-candidate-preferred result
National	Don Page	25,816	67.8	+3.3
Greens	Simon Richardson	12,268	32.2	+32.2
National hold		Swing	+3.3	

=== Elections in the 2000s ===
==== 2007 ====
2007 New South Wales state election: Ballina
Party	Candidate	Votes	%	±%
National	Don Page	21,983	54.4	+2.5
Labor	Melanie Doriean	9,330	23.1	−2.6
Greens	John Bailey	7,861	19.4	−0.2
Democrats	Ben Smith	714	1.8	+1.8
AAFI	Flora Boyd	551	1.4	+1.4
Total formal votes		41,439	98.5	+0.1
Informal votes		612	1.5	−0.1
Turnout		41,051	89.9	
Two-party-preferred result
National	Don Page	23,201	64.5	+5.1
Labor	Melanie Doriean	12,778	35.5	−5.1
National hold		Swing	+5.1	

==== 2003 ====
2003 New South Wales state election: Ballina
Party	Candidate	Votes	%	±%
National	Don Page	21,127	51.5	−0.9
Labor	Sue Dakin	10,668	26.0	−2.4
Greens	Jan Barham	8,053	19.6	+11.0
Independent	Nic Faulkner	664	1.6	+1.6
One Nation	Darren May	495	1.2	+1.2
Total formal votes		41,007	98.4	+0.4
Informal votes		657	1.6	−0.4
Turnout		41,664	91.0	
Two-party-preferred result
National	Don Page	22,158	59.0	−3.0
Labor	Sue Dakin	15,366	41.0	+3.0
National hold		Swing	−3.0	

=== Elections in the 1990s ===
==== 1999 ====
1999 New South Wales state election: Ballina
Party	Candidate	Votes	%	±%
National	Don Page	20,391	52.4	−7.7
Labor	Sue Dakin	11,071	28.4	+5.1
Greens	Chris Flower	3,333	8.6	−0.8
Democrats	Lorraine Robertson	1,675	4.3	−0.1
Christian Democrats	Phillip Gosper	1,025	2.6	+2.6
Independent	John MacGregor	524	1.3	+1.3
Earthsave	Elise Ward	523	1.3	+1.3
Timbarra Clean Water	Sue Arnold	390	1.0	+1.0
Total formal votes		38,932	98.0	+0.8
Informal votes		805	32.0	−0.8
Turnout		39,737	91.8	
Two-party-preferred result
National	Don Page	21,790	62.0	−4.5
Labor	Sue Dakin	13,347	38.0	+4.5
National hold		Swing	−4.5	

==== 1995 ====
1995 New South Wales state election: Ballina
Party	Candidate	Votes	%	±%
National	Don Page	23,214	61.1	+4.9
Labor	Veronica Black	8,622	22.7	−2.7
Greens	Richard Staples	3,627	9.6	+9.6
Democrats	Nic Faulkner	1,736	4.6	−0.2
Environment Inds	Lorraine Mafi-Williams	767	2.0	+2.0
Total formal votes		37,966	97.2	+1.4
Informal votes		1,084	2.8	−1.4
Turnout		39,050	93.0	
Two-party-preferred result
National	Don Page	24,533	67.4	+4.1
Labor	Veronica Black	11,869	32.6	−4.1
National hold		Swing	+4.1	

==== 1991 ====
1991 New South Wales state election: Ballina
Party	Candidate	Votes	%	±%
National	Don Page	18,378	56.2	−4.5
Labor	Maureen Lane	8,321	25.4	−3.1
Independent	Fast Bucks	3,521	10.8	+10.8
Democrats	Andrew Mignot	1,573	4.8	+0.3
Call to Australia	Alan Sims	907	2.8	+2.8
Total formal votes		32,700	95.8	−2.3
Informal votes		1,430	4.2	+2.3
Turnout		34,130	93.0	
Two-party-preferred result
National	Don Page	19,580	63.3	−3.9
Labor	Maureen Lane	11,372	36.7	+3.9
National hold		Swing	−3.9	

=== Elections in the 1980s ===
==== 1988 ====
1988 New South Wales state election: Ballina
Party	Candidate	Votes	%	±%
National	Don Page	18,022	61.5	+42.2
Labor	Thomas Mooney	8,240	28.1	−2.2
Independent	Di Edwards	1,780	6.1	+6.1
Democrats	Ivor Brown	1,262	4.3	+1.7
Total formal votes		29,304	98.1	−0.5
Informal votes		560	1.9	+0.5
Turnout		29,864	93.4	
Two-party-preferred result
National	Don Page	19,465	68.0	+2.4
Labor	Thomas Mooney	9,159	32.0	−2.4
National notional gain from Independent		Swing	N/A	

- The new district of Ballina took in areas from the Lismore, which was held by retiring Independent MP Bruce Duncan.

==== 1904 - 1988 ====
District abolished

=== Elections in the 1900s ===
==== 1901 ====
1901 New South Wales state election: Ballina
Party	Candidate	Votes	%	±%
Progressive	John Perry	805	58.6	+0.9
Liberal Reform	Thomas Temperley	305	22.2	−20.1
Independent	Thomas Russell	233	17.0	
Independent	Samuel Dutton	30	2.2	
Total formal votes		1,373	99.4	−0.3
Informal votes		8	0.6	+0.3
Turnout		1,381	66.0	+6.1
Progressive hold				

=== Elections in the 1890s ===
==== 1898 ====
1898 New South Wales colonial election: Ballina
Party	Candidate	Votes	%	±%
National Federal	John Perry	610	57.7	
Independent Federalist	Thomas Temperley	447	42.3	
Total formal votes		1,057	99.1	
Informal votes		10	0.9	
Turnout		1,067	59.9	
National Federal hold				

==== 1895 ====
1895 New South Wales colonial election: Ballina
Party	Candidate	Votes	%	±%
Protectionist	John Perry	489	53.7	
Ind. Protectionist	Thomas Temperley	422	46.3	
Total formal votes		911	99.0	
Informal votes		9	1.0	
Turnout		920	61.8	
Protectionist hold				

==== 1894 ====
1894 New South Wales colonial election: Ballina
Party	Candidate	Votes	%	±%
Protectionist	John Perry	674	56.4	
Labour	Alexander Hill	221	18.5	
Ind. Protectionist	George Martin	201	16.8	
Ind. Protectionist	Siegfried Sohn	81	6.8	
Ind. Protectionist	Samuel Dutton	18	1.5	
Total formal votes		1,195	99.1	
Informal votes		11	0.9	
Turnout		1,206	78.2	
Protectionist win		(new seat)		
