= SEARCH Foundation =

Australian not-for-profit organisation

- Predecessor: Communist Party of Australia
- Formation: 1990; 36 years ago
- Headquarters: Sydney Trades Hall, Sydney, New South Wales
- Location: Australia
- Website: www.search.org.au

The SEARCH Foundation is a left-wing, membership-based Australian not-for-profit organisation, with a number of high-profile members linked to the left of the Australian labour movement. SEARCH is an acronym for "Social Education, Action and Research Concerning Humanity".

The SEARCH Foundation advocates for a democratic socialist and ecologically socialist Australia, while working towards achieving greater democracy, economic and social equality, environmental sustainability, human rights, and international peace and cooperation.

== History ==
SEARCH was established in 1990 as a successor organisation of the Communist Party of Australia, with the object of promoting “greater understanding in the community of the main factors affecting social life, influencing social development and advancing social wellbeing.”

SEARCH also owns and controls access to the Communist Party archives, which are held in trust by the State Library of NSW.

== Activities ==
SEARCH regularly holds national speaking tours and runs a socialist education program. The Foundation publishes SEARCH News, featuring articles on US politics, Australian politics, and other international political matters. SEARCH also partners with policy analysis magazine Australian Options.

Between 2007 and 2010, SEARCH held a series of roundtables in major Australian capital cities on progressive political issues, culminating in the Australian Left Renewal Conference at the University of Technology Sydney in May 2010. SEARCH has supported International Women's Day marches and events in Sydney and Brisbane.

In 2020, SEARCH released a book entitled Comrades! Lives of Australian Communists, to mark the one hundred year anniversary of the founding of the Communist Party of Australia.

== Speaking tours ==
On 9 November 2017, SEARCH co-hosted an event in Melbourne, as part of a national tour for socialist and feminist author Beatrix Campbell.

In March 2018, SEARCH hosted Jacobin editor Bhaskar Sunkara at Sydney Trades Hall.

In 2018, with Amnesty International and United Voice, SEARCH hosted Singapore human rights and labour activist Jolovan Wham, who met with Commonwealth and New South Wales politicians to talk about human rights abuses in Singapore, which was subsequently the topic of an adjournment speech to the Australian Senate by Opposition Whip Anne Urquhart.

On 18 December 2018, SEARCH hosted an Australian Labor Party National Conference Fringe Event with UK Labour MP and Shadow Minister Clive Lewis.

== Notable members ==
- Sally McManus – Australian Council of Trade Unions Secretary
- Jack Mundey – Trade unionist and environmental activist
- Lee Rhiannon – Former NSW Greens Senator
- Eric Aarons – Author, sculptor and former leader of the Communist Party of Australia.
