= Blockade IMARC =

2019 protest in Melbourne, Australia

Blockade IMARC Alliance
- Founded at: Melbourne, Victoria, Australia
- Type: Advocacy group, protest movement
- Region served: Australia
- Fields: Environmental movement
- Website: blockadeimarc.com

Blockade IMARC refers to a protest against meetings of the International Mining and Resources Conference (IMARC) on the 29, 30 and 31 of October 2019 in Melbourne, Australia. The Blockade IMARC Alliance also refers to a protest movement which has the same goals of opposing IMARC.

== Events of 2019 ==
Blockade IMARC 2019
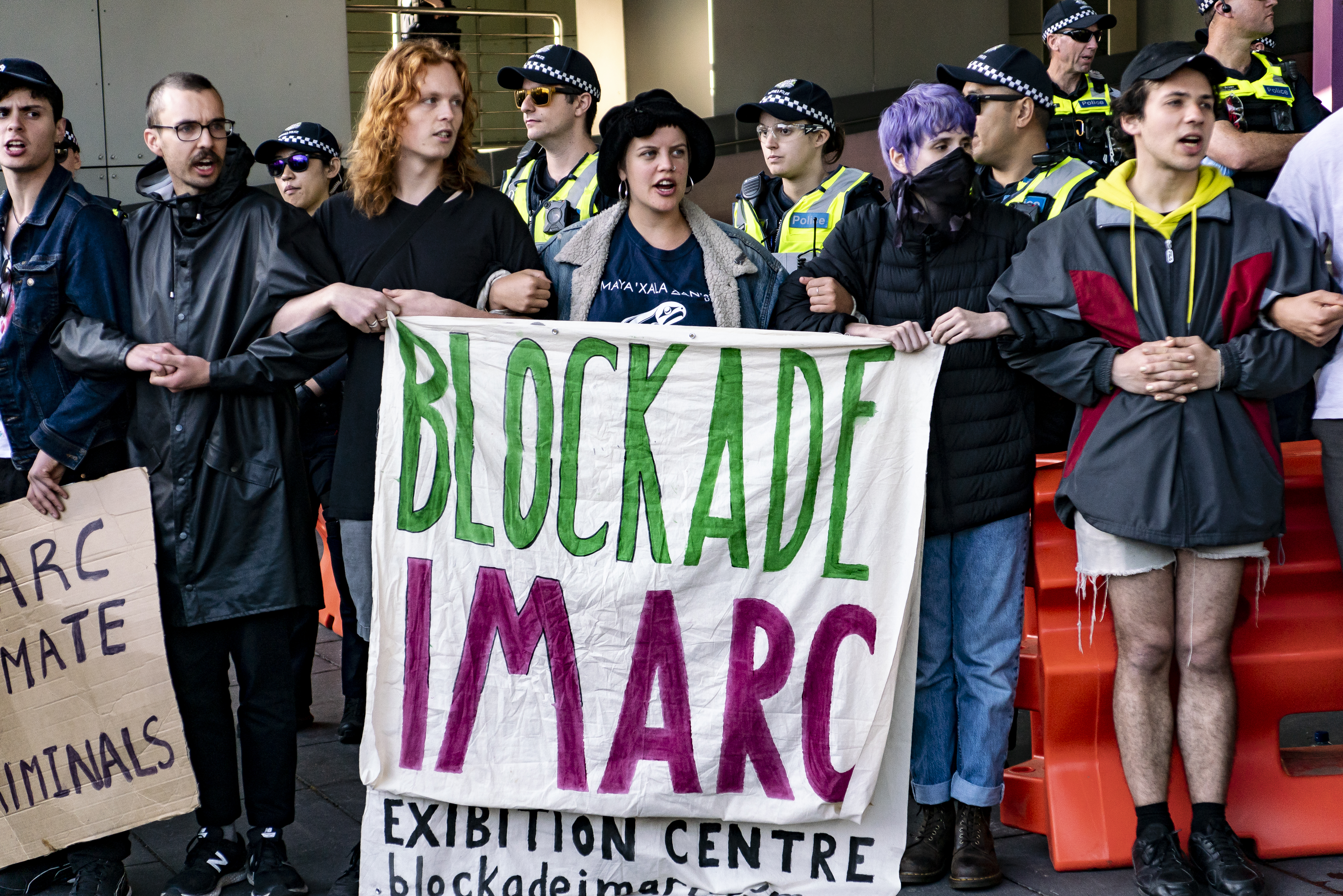
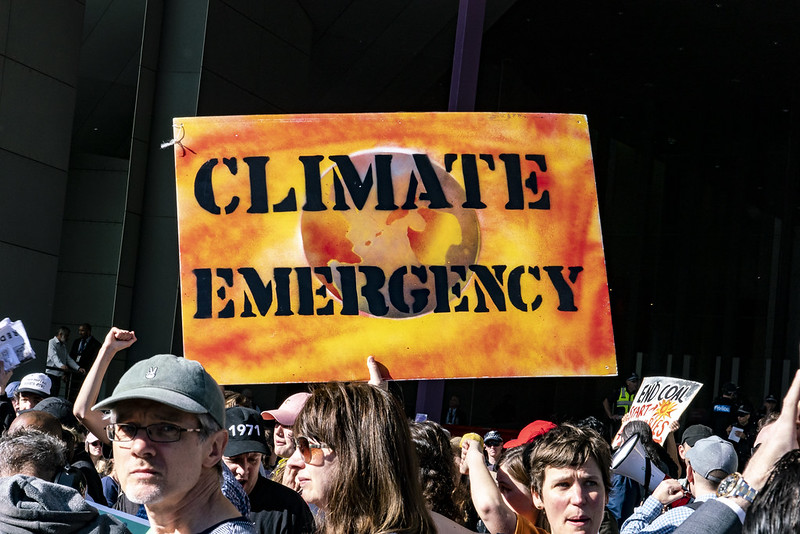
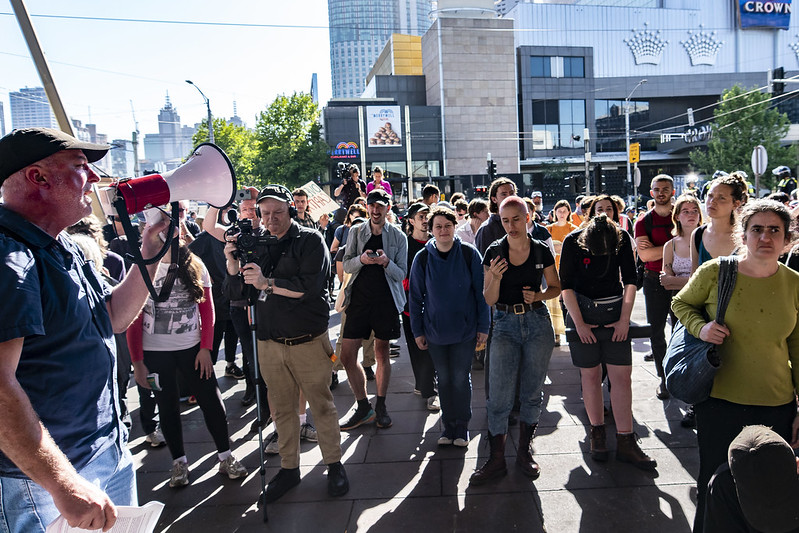
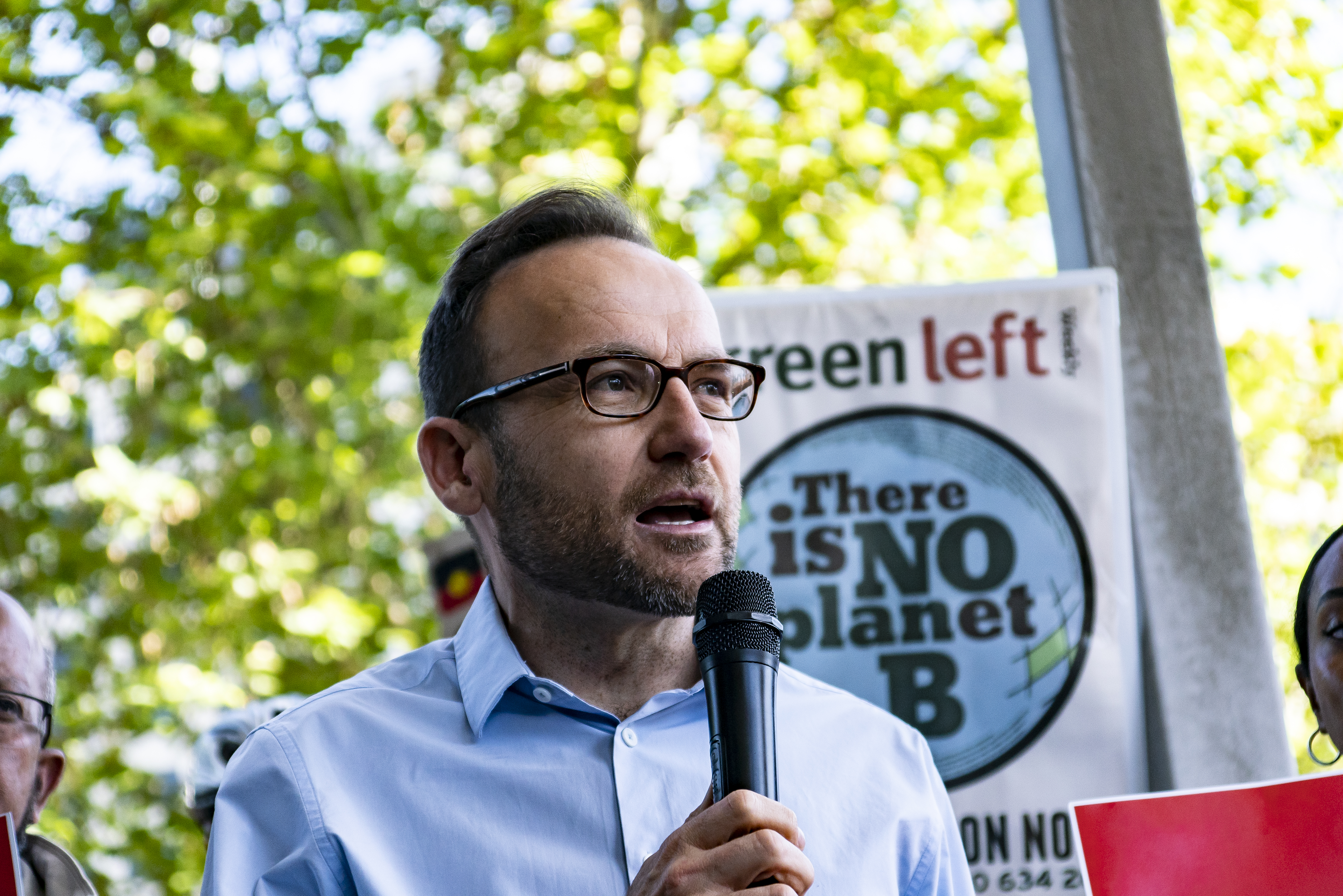
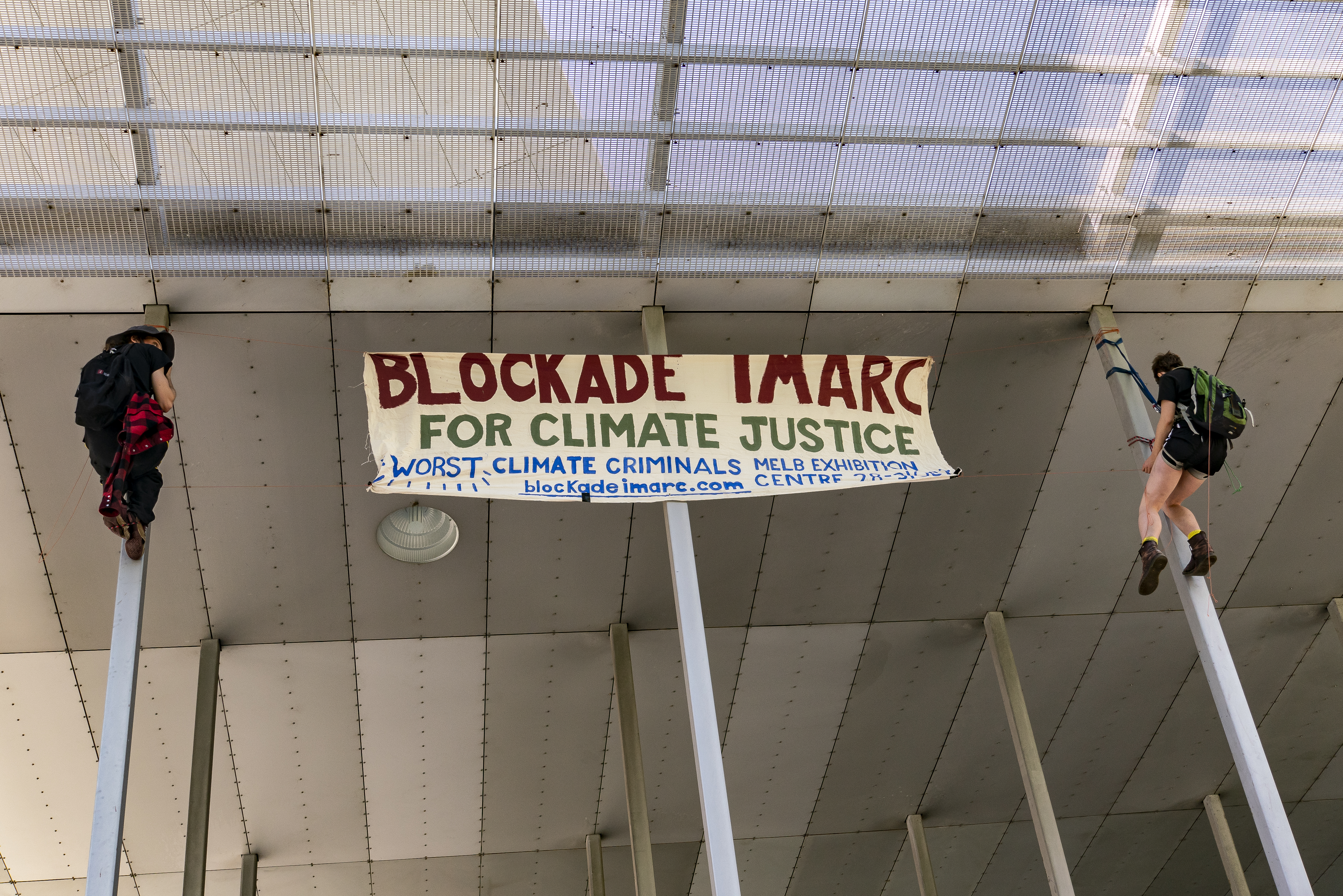
- A montage of images from day 2 of the 2019 IMARC blockade. Photos: Matt Hrkac
- Date: 29 October 2019 – 31 October 2019
- Location: Melbourne Convention and Exhibition Centre; Melbourne, Australia
- Goals: Non-violent blockade of IMARC
- Methods: Protests, non-violent direct action

Parties
Shut Down IMARC Alliance Supported by: Yarra City Council; Darebin City Council; Moreland City Council; Australian Greens Victoria; Victorian Socialists; Victorian Trades Hall Council	Victoria Police; Public Order Response Team

Lead figures
Collective leadership: Jacob Andrewartha; Emma Black; Marian Hart; Natalie Lowrey; Apsara Sabaratnam; Marisol Salinas; Jerome Small; Maria Soupos; Supported by: Adam Bandt; Sue Bolton; Luke Hilakari; Stephen Jolly; Lee Rhiannon; Lidia Thorpe	Lisa Neville: Sgt. Wayne Gatt; Cmd. Tim Tully

Casualties
- Injuries: 4
- Arrested: 107

Protests had taken place for several years prior to 2019 in opposition to IMARC - however these protests had been small for the most part. The 2019 blockade of IMARC was the first such protest that drew mass participation, mass media attention as well as a heavy handed crackdown by the Victorian Government.

On the 13th of August 2019, the Yarra City Council passed a resolution unanimously supporting the IMARC protest. In addition, the Moreland and Darebin City Councils also passed motions endorsing the protest. In addition, the Victorian Greens State Executive also endorsed the protest.

On Tuesday the 29th of October 2019, the protests commenced. According to The Age, "Police pushed protesters down the stairs, used their batons on those who refused to follow orders and repelled the crowd with capsicum spray, while activists harassed mining delegates, spat on them and dragged them to the ground". A protester named Camila was severely injured after being pushed by police onto the floor, where she was trampled by police horses. By the end of the first day, 47 protesters were arrested by police.

The protest continued onto the following Wednesday. The police reportedly "used capsicum spray at least four times" and 17 protesters were arrested, one for climbing up the building to put up a banner "charged with conduct endangering life".

On the 31st, the protesters moved to protest outside Rio Tinto and PwC's Melbourne offices. By the end of the final day, a total of 107 protesters had been arrested.

According to a Blockade IMARC organiser, the aim of the blockade was to protest the mining companies "exploiting workers, dispossessing indigenous people and violating human rights". Prior to the blockade, the event was planned to be the "S11 but for climate". The blockade was attended by "more than 20 splinter groups".

The police were criticised for their use of pepper spray against protesters, and former Greens senator Lee Rhiannon reported that she "witnessed a number of examples of police violence".

=== Aftermath ===
A day after the blockade completed, the Australian Prime Minister Scott Morrison stated that the government would implement laws against "environmental groups targeting businesses or firms involved in the mining sector".

On the 2nd of November 2019, ABC News reported that a Victorian Police officer was under investigation for having "EAD hippy" written on their body camera. The following day, a police officer was criticised for having "alt-right material" on their personal social media page after performing an OK gesture at the blockade, "a symbol frequently used by members of the far right".

On December 6, 2019, Melbourne Activist Legal Support compiled and published a 45-page report on its observations of the protest, saying "legal observers witnessed, recorded and documented multiple incidents of excessive, unnecessary and potentially unlawful uses of force, either as a coordinated crowd control tactic or by individual police members using excessive force within a police maneuver or tactic. This policing had a series of obviously harmful physical, emotional and psychological effects on the individuals affected."

== See also ==
- S11 (protest)
