= Dawn Walker =

Australian politician

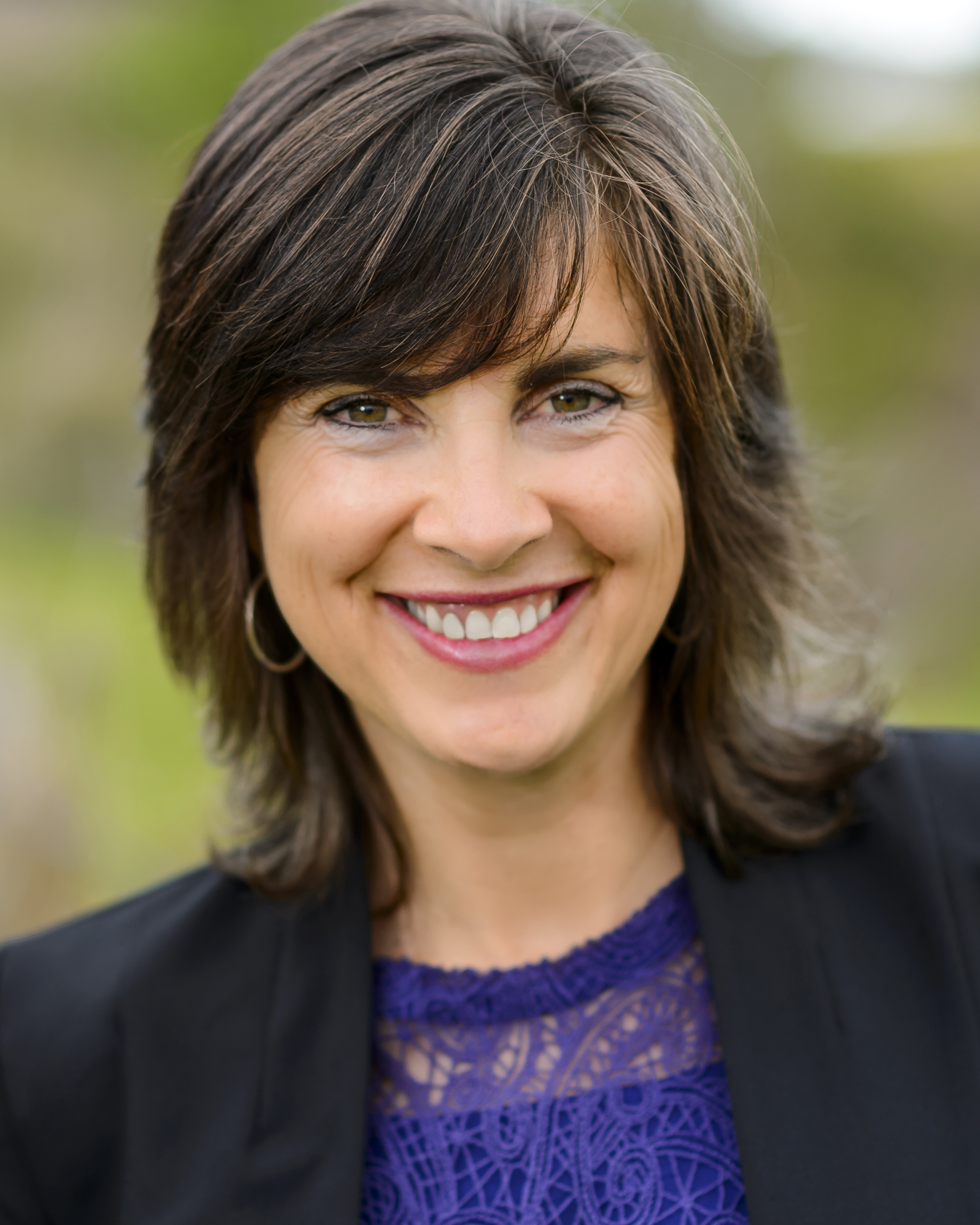

Member of the New South Wales Legislative Council
- In office 22 February 2017 – 23 March 2019
- Preceded by: Jan Barham

Personal details
- Born: Melbourne, Victoria, Australia
- Party: Greens (until 2019)
- Children: 3
- Education: Monash University; University of MelbourneLLB Griffith University
- Occupation: Community development consultant, policy adviser
- Website: Dawn Walker MLC

Dawn Elizabeth Walker is an Australian former politician. She was appointed as a Greens member of the New South Wales Legislative Council on 22 February 2017 to fill a casual vacancy resulting from the resignation of Jan Barham, and served until her defeat at the 2019 state election.

== Early life ==
Walker was born and schooled in Melbourne, graduating from Monash University with a Bachelor of Arts (Honours) and a Bachelor of Laws (Honours) from Griffith University.

She worked for 15 years as a policy adviser for Small Business Victoria, a state government agency. Beginning her career at the Commonwealth Employment Service, Dawn was responsible for developing and funding programs to make technical and further education more accessible to women.

In 2005, she moved with her partner and three children to Tweed Heads on the Far North Coast of New South Wales. Walker completed an Advanced Diploma of Fine Arts at Murwillumbah TAFE in 2011.

== Political career ==
Walker ran as the Greens candidate for the Division of Richmond at the 2013 and 2016 federal elections, increasing the Greens vote each time.

On 22 February 2017, Walker was elected by a joint sitting of the New South Wales Parliament to fill a casual vacancy resulting from the resignation of Jan Barham. Walker used her maiden speech to call for a re-examination of whether there should be dedicated seats in the NSW Parliament for Aboriginal people, elected by Aboriginal people, as occurs for Māori in the New Zealand Parliament.

On 6 December 2017, Walker was arrested along with 16 other people including fellow NSW Greens MLC Jeremy Buckingham after taking part in a blockade of Adani’s Carmichael coal mine rail construction site at Belyando, in Queensland. They were arrested and charged with trespass and failing to comply with police direction. In a statement following the arrest, Walker said "It was a very important day for me, stopping work on the Adani mine and being arrested with climate activists who understand the importance of preventing this destructive project from going ahead. I was proud to stand with traditional owners who have said 'no means no' to Adani, and made it clear they will not be surrendering their land and water to this coal corporation."

After being elected, Walker campaigned for the creation of a new 315,000 hectare Great Koala National Park in the Coffs Harbour hinterland and for an end to native forest logging in New South Wales.

Her preselection was controversial, with the returning officer of the ballot identifying "areas of concern" about the integrity of the process, and claims that Walker had broken party rules by using its email lists for campaigning purposes. These complaints were not upheld by the party's preselection disputes committee and a subsequent meeting of the Greens' State Delegates Council ratified the preselection.

Walker was defeated at the 2019 state election after being ranked third on the Greens ticket for the Legislative Council. She subsequently resigned her membership of the party.

== Post-political career ==
After serving her parliamentary term, Walker returned to artistic practice, painting vintage souvenirs and porcelain figurines, using these objects to reflect on tourism, regional identity and the ways people remember places.

Walker was selected as a finalist in Tweed Regional Gallery’s Wollumbin Art Award 2022 and 2024, the BAM Art Prize 2022, and the Heysen Prize for Landscape, Hahndorf Academy, 2022.

Walker's exhibition 'Porcelain Places' was featured in Tweed Regional Galley & Margaret Olley Art Centre and the London Royal Academy of Arts. Walker has also exhibited in various group shows including Small Works Gallery (Murwillumbah), Piece Gallery (Mullumbimby), Small Works Prize (Brunswick Street Gallery, Melbourne), and Yella Tail Studio, (MArts, Murwillumbah).
