= Tamara Smith =

Australian politician

Tamara Smith MP
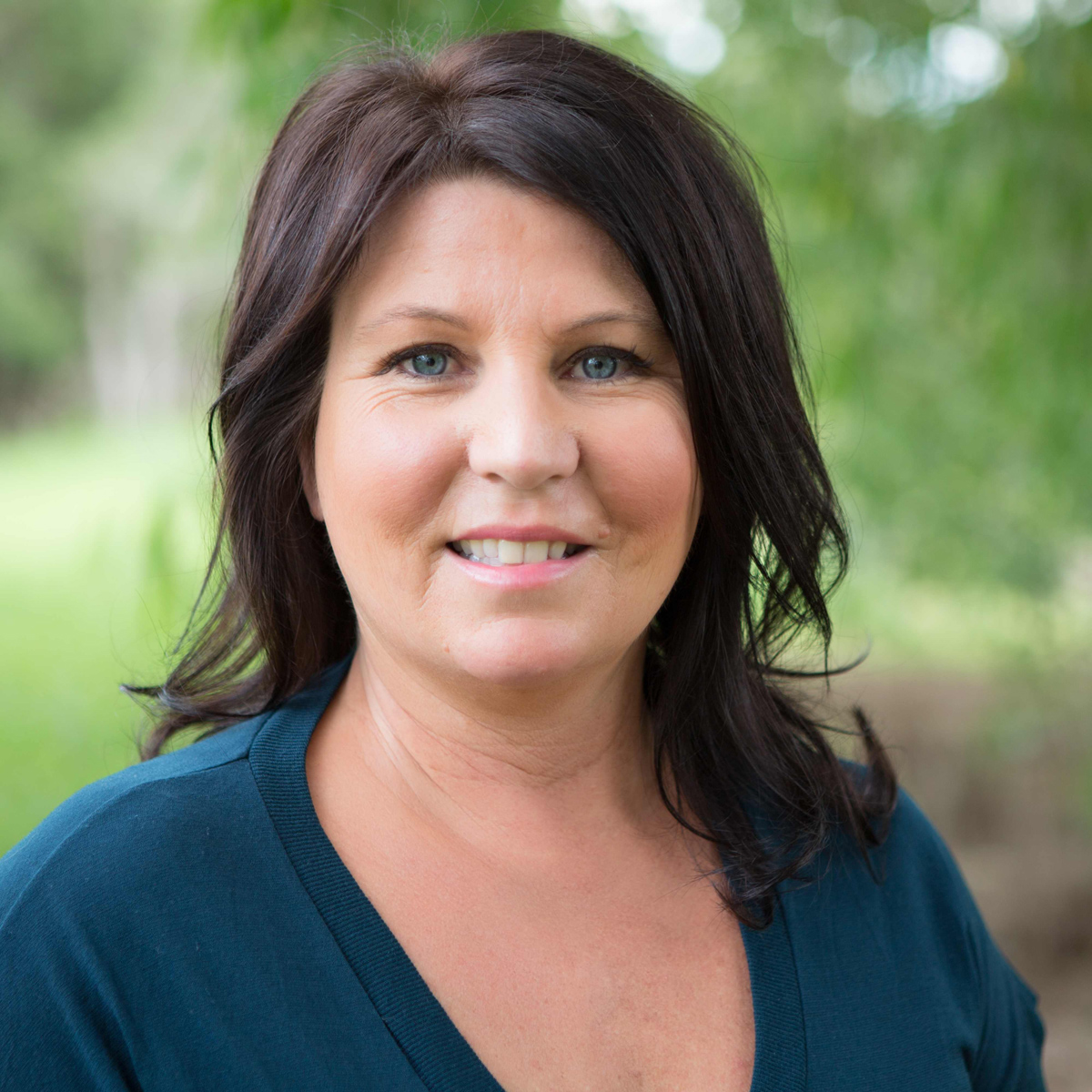

Member of the New South Wales Legislative Assembly for Ballina
- Incumbent
- Assumed office 28 March 2015
- Preceded by: Don Page

Personal details
- Born: 19 October
- Party: Greens New South Wales
- Education: University of New South Wales; University of Sydney; Southern Cross University
- Occupation: Secondary school teacher
- Profession: Solicitor
- Website: www.tamarasmith.com.au

Tamara Francine Smith is an Australian politician, representing Ballina in the New South Wales Legislative Assembly for the Greens since 2015.

Smith is the first non-conservative to represent the Ballina area in 88 years, first woman to hold the seat of Ballina, and the first regional Greens MP to represent a regional lower house seat in Australia.

== Early life and education ==
=== Childhood ===
Smith's father was an American corporate manager and their Australian mother worked as a secretary, and is one of four children, sisters Natasha and Nicole and brother Dominic who is a novellist The year following her parents' separation, the family home burned down and Smith's mother suffered a stroke and became disabled; the family struggled to make ends meet.

Smith's ancestors have lived in the Northern Rivers area of New South Wales for four generations.

Smith grew up in Hazelbrook in the Blue Mountains, and in Manly in Sydney, before moving to Byron Bay when she was 15.

Smith has one child, a daughter.

=== Education ===
Smith undertook at Bachelor of Arts at the University of NSW, before obtaining a Graduate Diploma in Education from the University of Sydney.

Smith has also completed a Bachelor of Laws (Hons) at Southern Cross University.

== Pre-parliamentary career ==
Smith was a secondary school teacher for many years in Ballina at Southern Cross High School, the Western suburbs of Brisbane and remote New South Wales, such as Broken Hill. Smith has been a member of the NSW Teachers Federation since 2002 and became the first female President of the Barrier Teachers Association in 60 years in 2002. Smith has also been admitted as a solicitor in NSW in 2010, and worked in Redfern and the Northern Territory.

Smith has also worked in the areas of social justice, Aboriginal affairs and public education advocacy and has a keen research interest in women’s rights and global warming.

== Political career ==
=== First term (2015–2019) ===
The 2015 state Election was a referendum on coal-seam gas, with the Bentley Blockade that saw tens of thousands of people participate in a series of blockades in the Northern Rivers against exploratory drilling by the resources company Metgasco.

Smith was preselected to stand as the Greens candidate for the state division of Ballina at the 2015 election against Nationals candidate Kris Beavis, after the retirement of Nationals incumbent Don Page.

Smith won Ballina at the 2015 state election with 27 percent of the primary vote, an increase of 4.5 percent, and 53.1 percent of the two-candidate preferred vote after out-polling Labor party's Paul Spooner following the allocation of preferences. Smith is the first woman to hold the seat of Ballina, and the first regional Greens MP to represent a regional lower house seat in Australia, and was joined two other Greens, Jamie Parker and Jenny Leong in the lower house of the New South Wales Parliament.

=== Second term (2019–2023) ===
Smith retained the seat of Ballina, with an increase of 4.7 percent of the primary vote and a 2.3 percent two-party swing in her favour, in the 2019 election. Smith was the only candidate calling for a halt to major developments, including the bypass and bus interchange, and a total opposition to the West Byron urban development.

Smith's portfolios included Climate Change, Regional Communities (including Regional Development), Tourism, Education, and Region: North Coast.

=== Third term (2023–present) ===
Smith was re-elected as the Member for Ballina for a third time at the 2023 election, pushing the Nationals into second place, and with the overwhelming preference for her over the Nationals and Labor with a further increase of 4.0 percent of the primary vote.

Smith is the portfolio holder for Education, Early Learning, Skills & TAFE, Premier & Cabinet, Older People, Veterans, Tourism and Disaster Relief, and is the Chair of the Joint Standing Committee on the Office of the Valuer General.

On 1 May 2026, Smith announced her retirement ahead of the 2027 state election.

== Outside of politics ==
Smith has also been an Adjunct Professor in the School of Law and Justice at Southern Cross University since 2023.

New South Wales Legislative Assembly
Preceded by Don Page	Member for Ballina; 2015–present	Incumbent
