= Don Page (politician) =

Australian politician

The Honourable Don Page OAM

Member of the New South Wales Parliament for Ballina
- In office 19 March 1988 – 6 March 2015
- Preceded by: New district
- Succeeded by: Tamara Smith

Minister for Local Government
- In office 4 April 2011 – 23 April 2014
- Premier: Barry O'Farrell
- Preceded by: Barbara Perry
- Succeeded by: Paul Toole

Minister for the North Coast
- In office 4 April 2011 – 23 April 2014
- Premier: Barry O'Farrell
- Preceded by: New position
- Succeeded by: Andrew Stoner

Personal details
- Born: 25 May 1951 (age 75) New South Wales, Australia
- Party: National Party
- Relations: Sir Earle Page (Grandfather)

Donald Loftus Page (born 25 May 1951) is a former Australian politician and member of the New South Wales Legislative Assembly representing Ballina for the National Party from 1988 to 2015. Page was deputy leader of the National Party in New South Wales from 2003 to 2007.

== Early years and background ==
Page is the grandson of former Australian Prime Minister Sir Earle Page. He was educated at the University of New England where he completed the degrees of Bachelor of Economics, Diploma in Rural Accounting, and Master of Economics. He played rugby union for New South Wales at under-23 level. Prior to becoming the member for Ballina, he was a financial analyst, economist, administrative manager, part-time lecturer, and beef producer. He has four children.

== Political career ==
His parliamentary career has included a stint as deputy leader of the NSW Nationals from 2003 to 2007. Page was appointed as Minister for Local Government and as Minister for the North Coast in the O'Farrell government and served in these roles between 2011 and 2014. On 22 April 2014, Page announced his intention to retire from politics at the next state election.

Page was awarded the Medal of the Order of Australia in the 2025 King's Birthday Honours.

== See also ==
- Political families of Australia

New South Wales Legislative Assembly
| New district | Member for Ballina; 1988–2015 | Succeeded by Tamara Smith |
Party political offices
| Preceded by John Turner | Deputy Leader of the New South Wales National Party; 2003–2007 | Succeeded by Andrew Fraser |
Political offices
| Preceded by Barbara Perry | Minister for Local Government; 2011–2014 | Succeeded by Paul Toole |
| New title | Minister for the North Coast; 2011–2014 | Succeeded by Andrew Stoner |
