= Jan Barham =

Member of the New South Wales Legislative Council

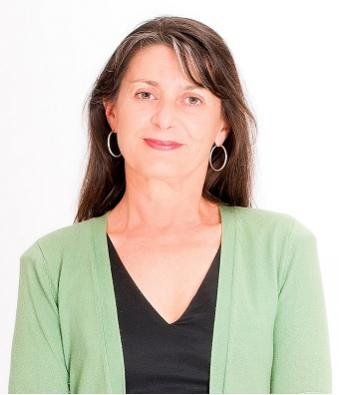

Member of the New South Wales Legislative Council
- In office 26 March 2011 – 13 February 2017
- Succeeded by: Dawn Walker

Mayor of Byron Shire
- In office 27 March 2004 – 2012
- Succeeded by: Simon Richardson

Personal details
- Born: 8 October 1958 (age 68)
- Party: Greens New South Wales

Janette Louise Barham (born 8 October 1958) is an Australian politician who was a member of the New South Wales Legislative Council between 2011 and 2017.

== Early life ==
Barham grew up in Wollongong in the southern suburb of Unanderra and was educated at Figtree High School. She later attended university in Newcastle, but did not graduate. She later went on to study at Wollongong TAFE and then won a statewide scholarship to attend East Sydney Tech, where she earned two trade certificates. Upon completion, she undertook work experience with a fashion company and then was then offered a full‐time job in the fashion industry in Sydney, where she lived for eight years prior to moving to the North Coast in 1989, where she currently resides.

Barham quickly became involved in local environmental groups and campaigning in the area. When the then state government granted support and the local council approved the development of a local resort by multinational tourism organisation Club Med, Barham founded and acted as secretary of Byron Shire Businesses for the Future to oppose the resort. The organisation legally challenged the approval by the council, and were ultimately successful in the Land and Environment Court.

== Political career ==
Barham was secretary of the Tweed Byron Greens in 1993-4 and in 1995 was assistant secretary of the Greens NSW. She worked as a staffer for Green MP Ian Cohen in state parliament from 1995 until 1999.

In 1999, Barham was elected to Byron Shire Council. In 2002, after the Greens gained minority control of the council, she became deputy mayor and, in 2004, she was the first Green mayor to be popularly elected in NSW and served a second term as Mayor of Byron Shire, having been reelected in 2008.

Barham was elected vice president of the NSW Local Government Association and has been a member of state boards and committees including the Ministerial Advisory Council on Women, the Natural Resources Advisory Sub Committee on Coasts and Natural Environment and the Northern Rivers Tourism Board. She has been a member of Cape Byron Headland Trust Committee from 1997 and on the management committee of the Arakwal National Park from 2001.

She ran as a member of the Greens for the federal seat of Richmond in 2001 and for the state seat of Ballina in 2003.

She was elected to the New South Wales Legislative Council at the 2011 state election.

In 2011, Barham's portfolio responsibilities within the Greens included: Family and Community Services, Ageing, Disability Services, Aboriginal Affairs, Arts, and Tourism.

In 2012 Barham had to resign as Mayor of Byron Shire, as a result of new state laws (labelled in the media as the "Get Clover" laws) preventing dual membership of state parliament and local councils.

In 2016, Barham took a leave of absence from parliament, suffering from exhaustion and depression. On her return in October, she announced that she had decided to resign from the parliament for health reasons. On 22 February, Dawn Walker was elected by a joint sitting of the parliament to fill the casual vacancy.
