= Left Renewal =

- Founded: December 2016; 9 years ago
- Ideology: Green politics Anti-capitalism; Socialism; Libertarian socialism
- Political position: Left-wing to far-left
- Regional affiliation: The Greens NSW

Left Renewal was a political faction that existed within The Greens NSW, which was established publicly in late 2016. Described by elements of the media as hard left, it regularly promoted ideologies and beliefs such as anti-capitalism, anti-imperialism, feminism, and anti-racist arguments through its online spaces and community events.

== Ideology ==
Left Renewal launched their official Statement of Principles in late December 2016. It mirrors the Four Pillars that are the foundation policies of The Australian Greens and state Greens branches, with added emphasis on the intersection between these pillars and a critique of capitalism.

The group has also made comment, through Facebook posts, printed flyers, and other media, on issues such as left populism, the rise of Jeremy Corbyn, rape culture, carceral feminism, Indigenous sovereignty, Palestinian self-determination and the state of Israel, the rise of modern fascism, the Australian housing crisis of the 2010s, public school funding, the RAAF's participation in the Syrian conflict, the refugee crisis and Australia's refugee detention centres, penalty rates, and many other progressive issues.

=== Social justice ===
The Left Renewal platform argues that society's struggle for social justice brings people into irreconcilable conflict with the capitalist mode of production and all other forms of class society, requiring them to take a strong stance on the struggle of the working class. This understanding of the working class extends "past the factory" to include home workers, sex workers, and others. It promotes workplace organising and support union activity as a vital political activity, whether in syndicates or traditional union structures. As part of this, the group commits to never undermining the industrial action of workers, a reference to the practice of 'scabbing' on striking workers by crossing a picket-line. Furthermore, the group pledges to join a union of some form in whatever place they may work.

As part of the social justice principle, the group recognises the need to create alternatives to and challenge all authoritarian and exploitative economic models, which it argues must ultimately require socialising the means of production. It rejects the idea that society can truly be changed through ‘good people’ gaining control of authoritarian and exploitative power structures, and that individual changes to personal consumption can create change. Finally, it outlines the necessity to take strategic concerns seriously. This includes unity and solidarity on the principle that work should serve to accomplish political goals, strengthen grassroots movements, build political consciousness, and lead the world on a path to social transformation.

=== Grassroots democracy ===
As part of the group's interpretation of the 'grassroots democracy' pillar of the party, the statement strongly argues for a participatory, democratic society that they say will be embodied in the organisation, through value the organisation places on participatory self-management, through members having agency over decisions which affect them, and through access to resources on which they are dependent in proportion to the degree to which they are affected. Left Renewal argues that democracy "must come from the people, not from the bureaucracy"; a reference to the structure and function of the faction, of the party-at-large, and of society-at-large.

Furthering this critique of bureaucracy, it argues that this can function as a mediator to suppress radical change. As such, and because of this, the group supports rank-and-file control of unions and of the Greens. Reiterating the grassroots underpinning of the pillar, it outlines that change can only come from below, not from bureaucratic declaration and mediation. In terms of its internal organising practices, Left Renewal states that a "degree of tactical unity" is necessary in order to have real collective influence. Once decision-making has taken place, in a participatory and democratic fashion, it is required by members that they respect, implement and where necessary, bind on the organisation's democratic decisions. The group states, quite simply, that, "In unity there is strength."

Left Renewal has argued, and actively organised, for the direct and democratic election of the party's parliamentary leader. The group is generally in favour of a leader-less national structure, with greater agency invested in the states to allocate policy portfolios and other powers.

Left Renewal has been critical of the Greens' practice of announcing 'Election Initiatives' - policy ideas that are released in official election periods, and mandated to align loosely with Greens' policy. These are approved by a Senator's office, rather than by state branches or the National Council. This has most controversially been the case with Richard Di Natale's Sugar Tax.

=== Peace and non-violence ===
Left Renewal statement then goes on to outline the violent and antagonistic relationship that they see between capitalism and workers. It is argued that as workers, waged or unwaged, all people experience perpetual violence and that this violence must be brought to an end. Due to this, the group forthrightly claims, "We therefore fight to bring about the end of capitalism." It outlines that it believes that capitalism relies on violent and authoritarian divisions within the working class, such as elitism, sexism, racism, homophobia, transphobia, religious sectarianism, and ableism (among others); and that it is only with the abolition of these authoritarian relations that people will be able to create a thriving movement capable of transforming society. Due to this, the group feels there is an imperative to challenge these wherever they encounter it.

Left Renewal puts forward that the prosecution of peace requires an explicit rejection of imperialism, and the genocide upon which it depends. It contends that Australia is based upon an act of genocide which exists within a broader framework of global imperialism. As part of this, it rejects the artificial creation of borders, and supports the liberation struggles of oppressed peoples for their sovereignty and land rights. The group also promotes a rejection of class antagonism, and that a rejection of capitalism also depends on a rejection of the state’s legitimacy and the right of it, and its apparatuses, to impose oppression upon the working class and oppressed people. This, it argues, is in order to liberate the working class and all oppressed people. This includes state-mediated oppression in all of its forms, and recognises that violent apparatuses like the police force, "do not share an interest with the working class".

Left Renewal has advocated for aggressive tactics in the pursuit of anti-fascist action, against police brutality, and in serving the interests of Indigenous Australians, arguing these are all forms of self-defense and therefore equate to legitimate forms of violence. This has led to some condemnation from the more conservative elements of the party, primarily through Richard Di Natale and the party Co-convenors.

=== Environmental sustainability ===
Finally, Left Renewal outlines their approach to environmental sustainability as a movement to achieve climate justice, primarily through forms of eco-socialism. It is heavily argued that the intersection between society and environment cannot be separated, and that an internationalist perspective of climate justice is needed that recognises that all people are part of a global ecosystem irrespective of ethnicity, gender, or sexuality. As a logical conclusion to this, the group argues that people can only resolve climate change by achieving climate justice; again, providing a simple summation of, "None of us are free, until we are all free". This follows on to the argument that the interests of the environment, and the working class, should never be pitted against one another, and that working toward a just transition in collaboration with and alongside the working class, is needed in order to "uncover a renewable world". The statement concludes by outlining that solutions to climate change cannot come from green-capital partnerships, and top-down market solutions, but must come from people organising in their workplaces and their communities. As such, the group opposes consumer taxes, such as ‘cap and trade’ mechanisms, and cross-class compromises with big business and capital.

== Controversy ==
It has been alleged that the group is aligned with former Senator Lee Rhiannon and Senator David Shoebridge, though the group denies any involvement from current or former MPs. According to the group's own description, it is composed of rank and file Greens NSW members and as such MPs, MLCs, and senators are not eligible for membership.

In early 2017, a 'Grassroots Greens' faction of the Victorian Greens branch was made public. While this group purports to be aligned with Left Renewal, both groups have maintained that they are two separate entities.

In June 2017 Rhiannon was suspended from the Federal Greens party room following an internal dispute over her opposition to the Federal Greens' support for the Turnbull government education funding changes. The Greens New South Wales subsequently issued a statement reiterating its support for Senator Rhiannon and support for public education.

== Criticism ==
The group has drawn criticism from former Federal Greens Leader Richard Di Natale, completely dismissing the group as incompatible with the Greens principles and values, saying, "If the authors of this ill-thought through manifesto are so unhappy with Greens policies, perhaps they should consider finding a new political home." Former Greens leader Bob Brown described the group as a "hoax".
