= Community Union Defence League =

Australian community group

- Founded: 2016
- Location: Australia
- Website: www.cudl.org.au

The Community Union Defence League (CUDL) is an Australian mutual aid group that is led by the Australian Communist Party.

== History ==
In November 2020, a street kitchen was started by CUDL in Coffs Harbour in response to significant homelessness in the area.

In August 2021, CUDL Adelaide members manning a street kitchen in Whitmore Square were approached by South Australia's Department of Human Services and told they would need to relocate to a different part of the city. The Australian Communist Party and the state Labor opposition questioned whether the visit from the DHS representative constituted a conflict of interest after it was found the chief executive of the DHS also had business ties to a pub nearby.

In March 2025, CUDL Brisbane held a protest at Musgrave Park against the decision of Lord-Mayor Adrian Schrinner to evict homeless campers from council parks, with the lead organizer of the protest calling the move "shameful" and "evil".

In 2026, CUDL announced that it would shut down operations in every state but Queensland.
