= New South Wales Greens =

New South Wales Greens The Greens NSW
- State Manager: Jamie Parker
- Secretary: Gregory Henderson
- Founded: 1991; 35 years ago
- Headquarters: 19a/1 Hordern Place, Camperdown NSW 2050
- Membership (2019): ▲3,695
- Ideology: Green politics Progressivism; Factions: Eco-socialism; Green liberalism
- Political position: Centre-left to left-wing
- National affiliation: Australian Greens
- Colours: Green
- Legislative Assembly: 3 / 93
- Legislative Council: 4 / 42
- Senate: 2 / 12 (NSW seats)
- Local government councillors: 73 / 1,480
- Local government mayors: 1 / 128

Website
- greens.org.au/nsw

The New South Wales Greens, officially known as The Greens NSW, is a green political party in New South Wales and a member of the Australian Greens. First formed in 1991, the NSW Greens began as a state-level party before joining with other green parties in Australia to create the current confederated structure.

The NSW Greens continue to be separate to the other state and territory Greens parties in several regards. The NSW Greens tend to be more left-wing in their political positions in comparison to the other state parties, and continues to maintain the original Greens policy of not having a single parliamentary leader, instead being based on principles of collective leadership.

The party currently sits on the crossbench in the New South Wales Parliament, and has representation federally in the Senate.

== History ==
The first Greens party was registered in 1984, but the Greens NSW did not take its current form until 1991, when six local groups in New South Wales federated as a state political party. Greens candidates have run in every federal election since 1984, when a single candidate ran in the federal Division of Sydney.

The founding document of the Greens NSW described the organisation as the following:

The Greens in Sydney come from many backgrounds. Environmental and resident activists. Nuclear disarmers. Dissidents from the Labor Party who have witnessed betrayals by both wings of that party. Feminists. Anarchists. Those inspired by the German Greens. Socialists of various kinds. What is distinctive and unifying about this new force in Sydney is the emphasis on encouraging people's self-confidence in their right to have their say, their right to democratically determine matters – whether they are large or small – which affect their lives.

=== Local government ===
The party endorses candidates to stand for election in many of the 128 local government areas across NSW, including in rural and regional areas where the major parties usually do not run candidates on party tickets. The Greens NSW currently have 58 councillors on 32 local councils around NSW.

In NSW, local government elections were held in September 2016 and September 2017.

In 2016 The Greens elected three mayors and 24 councillors in the 29 areas where candidates stood. Greens councillors were elected for the first time in: Albury, Broken Hill, Clarence Valley, Glen Innes Severn, Goulburn Mulwaree, Kyogle and Yass Valley. The Greens also grew their vote in Bellingen, Byron, Shoalhaven, Campbelltown, Kiama, Hawkesbury, Wingecarribee, Lismore, Hawkesbury and the Blue Mountains.

In 2017 The Greens elected a further 31 Councillors in Armidale, Bathurst, Canterbury Bankstown, Canada Bay, Hornsby, Inner West, Newcastle, Northern Beaches, Orange, Parramatta, Queanbeyan Palerang, Randwick, Ryde. Snowy Mountains. Waverley, Willoughby, Woollahra, Wollongong.

=== New South Wales state elections ===
NSW election results
Primary vote (LA)

- 1995: 2.6%
- 1999: 3.9%
- 2003: 8.4%
- 2007: 9.0%
- 2011: 10.3%
- 2015: 10.3%
- 2019: 9.6%
- 2023: 9.7%

The party first came close to electing a candidate in 1991, when Ian Cohen was the last Upper House candidate to be excluded in a contest against Christian Democratic Party leader Fred Nile for the final statewide seat. In the subsequent 1995 election, Cohen was elected to the NSW Legislative Council and became the first Greens parliamentary representative in NSW. In 1999 he was joined by Lee Rhiannon and in 2003 he was re-elected and joined by Sylvia Hale.

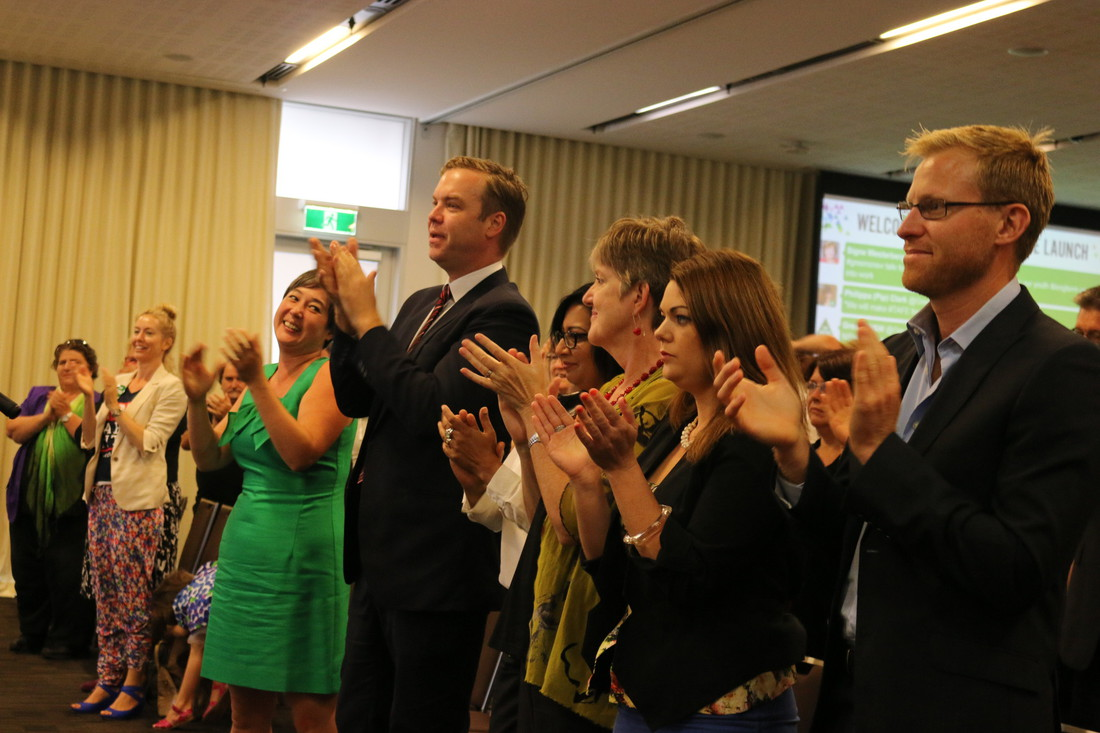
Greens members celebrating during the 2015 NSW election

In 2007 Lee Rhiannon was re-elected to the Legislative Council and joined by John Kaye, bringing the number of Members of the Legislative Council to four. In 2010 Lee Rhiannon resigned from the Legislative Council to contest and win a Senate seat, and Sylvia Hale also resigned her seat. The resulting casual vacancies were filled by Cate Faehrmann and David Shoebridge respectively.

At the 2011 NSW state election the Greens further increased their vote, resulting in the election of Jamie Parker as the first Greens member of the Legislative Assembly, representing Balmain. David Shoebridge was re-elected and joined by Jan Barham and Jeremy Buckingham in the Legislative Council.

In 2013 Cate Faehrmann resigned from the Legislative Council to contest a Senate seat. The resulting casual vacancy was filled by Mehreen Faruqi of the South Sydney Greens.

At the 2015 state election current sitting members Jamie Parker, John Kaye and Mehreen Faruqi were re-elected. Two new members were elected to the Legislative Assembly: Jenny Leong in the new seat of Newtown and Tamara Smith in the previously safe National seat of Ballina. The Greens primary vote in Newtown of 45.6% is the party's highest ever primary vote in a lower house electorate. This resulted in five Legislative Council seats and three Legislative Assembly seats.

In October 2016, Jan Barham resigned and the casual vacancy was filled a few months later by former federal candidate for Richmond, Dawn Walker.

In December 2018, Jeremy Buckingham resigned from the Greens NSW. Buckingham described the party as more focused on "bringing down capitalism" and "divisive identity politics" than acting on climate change.

At the 2019 state election there were two upper house Greens seats up for contest as was Buckingham's. David Shoebridge was re-elected, Abigail Boyd (former federal candidate for Dobell) won one but Dawn Walker lost hers. Each of the three lower house seats were returned with a favourable swing.

=== Constitutional Convention ===
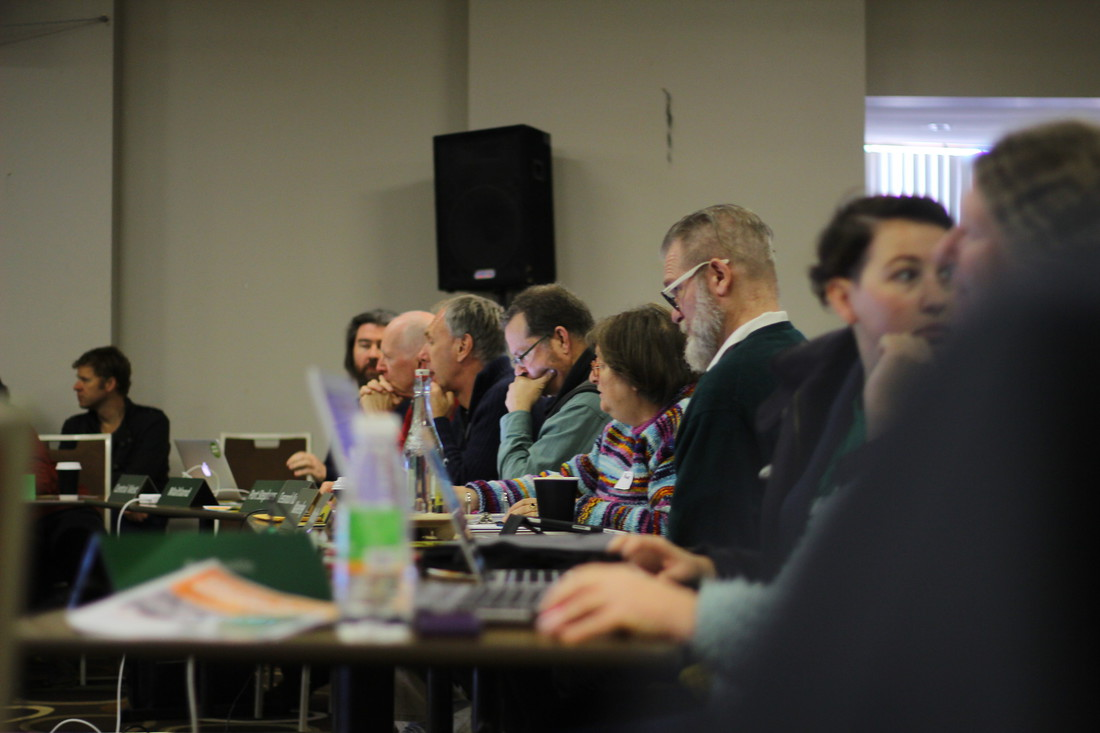
Greens NSW members representing their local groups at an SDC meeting in 2015

In 1997 The Greens NSW formed part of a joint ticket called Greens, Bill of Rights, Indigenous Peoples for the 1998 Constitutional Convention held in Canberra in February 1998. Catherine Moore led the ticket and was elected for NSW. She joined Christine Milne from Tasmania to focus on ensuring that the overall process was more inclusive.

== Structure ==
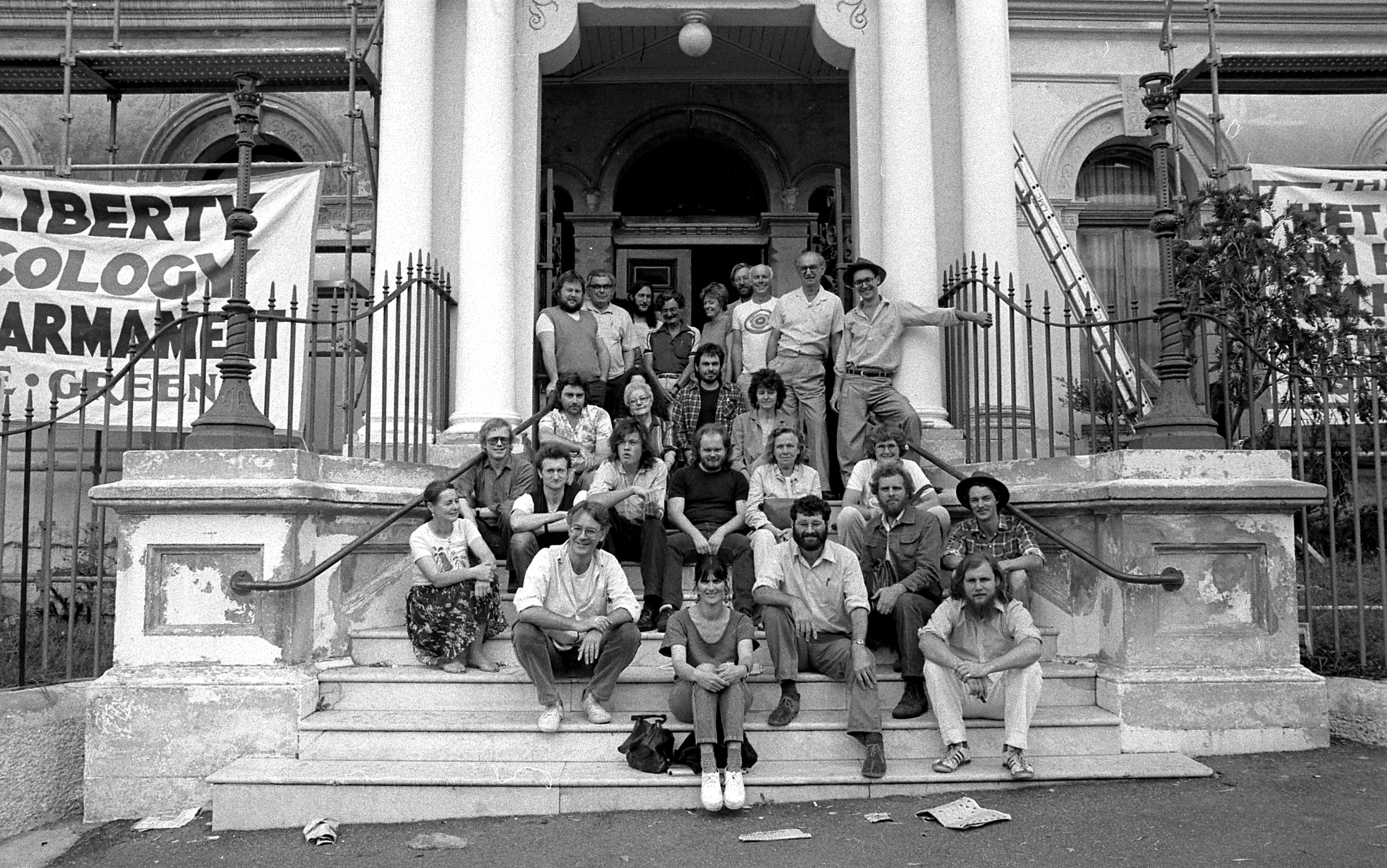
The Greens NSW was founded when local Greens groups federated into a statewide party.

The Greens NSW retain the same basic structure which was created in 1991, with the formation of the statewide party.

=== State Delegates Council ===
The Greens NSW make decisions affecting the state party through the State Delegates Council (SDC), a meeting that consists of a delegate from each local group. The SDC is the highest decision-making body, and controls election campaigns for statewide candidatures (such as the Senate and Legislative Council). It also decides on admitting new local groups as members of the Greens NSW.

=== Local groups ===
The party is made up of 'local groups', who cover a specific geographical area. Local groups have complete responsibility for elections held in their area, particularly elections for the House of Representatives, the New South Wales Legislative Assembly or Local Government. There are currently 56 affiliated local groups in NSW.

=== Working groups ===
A variety of working groups have been established by the SDC, which are directly accessible to all Greens members. Working groups perform an advisory function by developing policy, conducting issues-based campaigns, or performing other tasks assigned by the SDC. These include:

- Young Greens
- Sex, Sexuality and Gender Identity Working Group
- Women's Working Group
- Refugee Working Group
- Economics Working Group

== Ideology and policies ==
The party has described itself as being based on the principles of: ecological sustainability, grassroots democracy, social justice, peace and non-violence.

The NSW Greens want to ban new coal and gas projects, as well as ban logging in public native forests, and aim for net-zero carbon emissions in NSW by 2035. They want to transition towards a circular economy that eliminates waste and expand the protected areas network in NSW to at least 30% of the total landmass.

On economic issues, the NSW Greens want to tax big business and redirect the money towards public services. The NSW Greens want to make public education free, including early childhood education, as well as make healthcare free and move towards more public ownership over hospitals and health clinics. The party supports nationalisation of public transport and making it free to use in New South Wales. The party wants to strengthen renters rights and impose rent controls, as well as invest in public housing. The NSW Greens want to expand worker's rights.

The party supports a legal and regulated market for the sale of cannabis.

The party also supports a legal and regulated market for vaping. In this regard it supports elements such as: limits on nicotine levels in vapes, prohibiting the use of harmful chemicals in vapes, the requirement of health warnings on all vaping products, regulate vaping products so that nicotine vapes are only available to those aged over 18-years-old, to fund education programs targeted at teenagers to warn them of the dangers of vaping, and reduce the waste caused by vaping by placing requirements on producers to minimise waste and recycle used nicotine vapourisers.

== Political factions ==
There was only one publicly acknowledged faction within Greens New South Wales which is the Left Renewal faction. It was formed in late 2016 and presented itself as the far-left, anti-capitalist wing of state's party. As of 2021, Left Renewal is not active within the party.

== Electoral results ==
=== New South Wales ===
Election	Legislative Assembly				Legislative Council				
Election	Votes	% of votes	Seats won	+/–	Votes	% of votes	Seats won	Overall seats	+/–
1991	16,556	0.54	0 / 99		106,325	3.32	0 / 15	0 / 42	
1995	87,862	2.57	0 / 99	0	126,591	3.75	1 / 21	1 / 42	▲1
1999	145,019	3.88	0 / 93	0	103,463	2.91	1 / 21	2 / 42	▲1
2003	315,370	8.25	0 / 93	0	320,010	8.60	2 / 21	3 / 42	▲1
2007	352,805	8.95	0 / 93	0	347,548	9.12	2 / 21	4 / 42	▲1
2011	427,144	10.28	1 / 93	▲1	453,125	11.12	3 / 21	5 / 42	▲1
2015	453,031	10.29	3 / 93	▲2	412,660	9.92	2 / 21	5 / 42	0
2019	435,401	9.57	3 / 93	0	432,999	9.73	2 / 21	4 / 42	▼1
2023	455,960	9.70	3 / 93	0	419,346	9.08	2 / 21	4 / 42	0

=== Federal ===
Election	New South Wales House seats				New South Wales Senate seats				
Election	Votes	% of votes	Seats won	+/–	Votes	% of votes	Seats won	Overall seats	+/–
1990	45,819	1.37	0 / 51		64,583	2.0	0 / 6	0 / 12	
1993	50,052	1.41	0 / 50	0	74,620	2.1	0 / 6	0 / 12	0
1996	92,549	2.52	0 / 50	0	85,004	2.3	0 / 6	0 / 12	0
1998	98,647	2.66	0 / 50	0	81,612	2.2	0 / 6	0 / 12	0
2001	180,079	4.75	0 / 50	0	169,139	4.36	1 / 6	1 / 12	▲1
2004	311,369	8.09	0 / 50	0	291,845	7.34	0 / 6	1 / 12	0
2007	320,031	7.88	0 / 49	0	353,286	8.43	0 / 6	0 / 12	▼1
2010	410,405	10.24	0 / 48	0	443,913	10.69	1 / 6	1 / 12	▲1
2013	330,050	7.95	0 / 48	0	340,941	7.79	0 / 6	1 / 12	0
2016	390,737	8.95	0 / 47	0	332,860	7.41	1 / 12	1 / 12	0
2019	395,238	8.71	0 / 47	0	409,790	8.73	1 / 6	1 / 12	0
2022	466,069	10.02	0 / 47	0	550,069	11.56	1 / 6	2 / 12	▲1
2025	530,316	11.06	0 / 46	0	557,610	11.18	1 / 6	2 / 12	0

== Members of Parliament ==
=== Federal Parliament ===
Senator Mehreen Faruqi (2018–present)

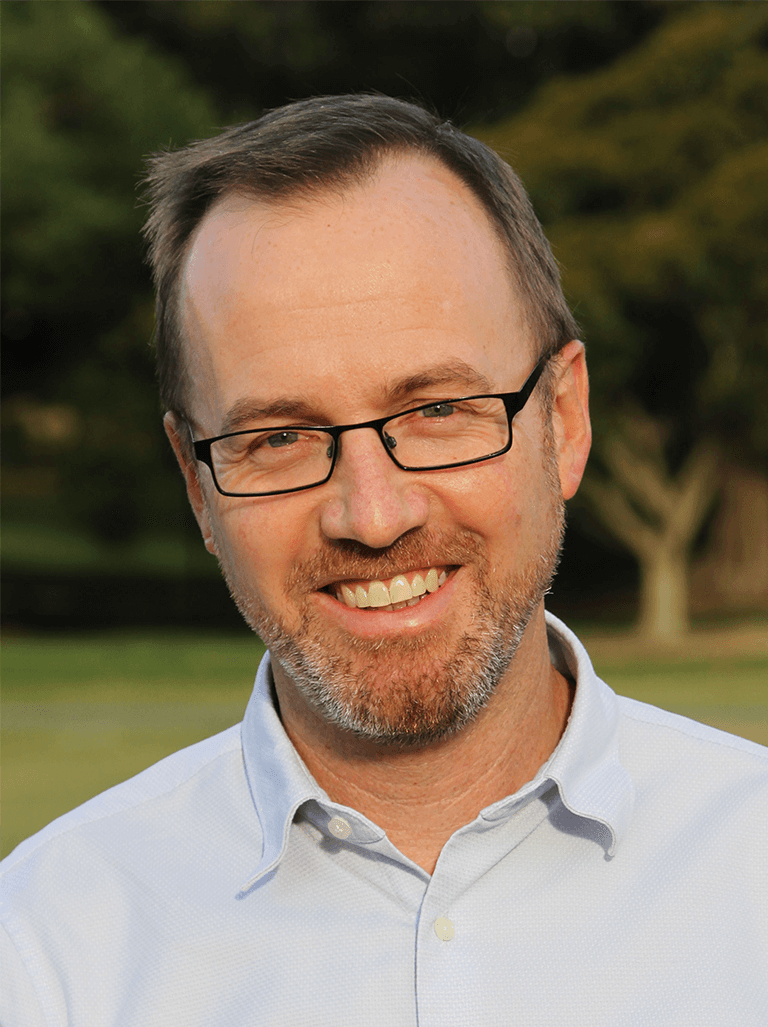
Senator David Shoebridge (2022–present)

==== Former ====
- Michael Organ, MP for Cunningham (2002–2004)
- Senator Kerry Nettle (2002–2008)
- Senator Lee Rhiannon (2011–2018)

=== State Parliament ===
==== Legislative Assembly ====
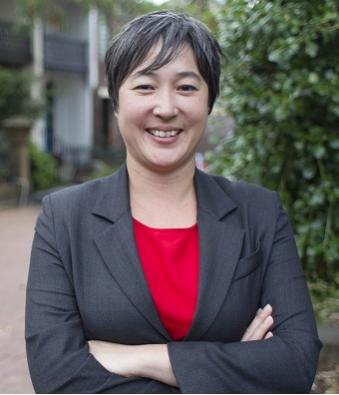
Jenny Leong, MLA for Newtown (2015–present)

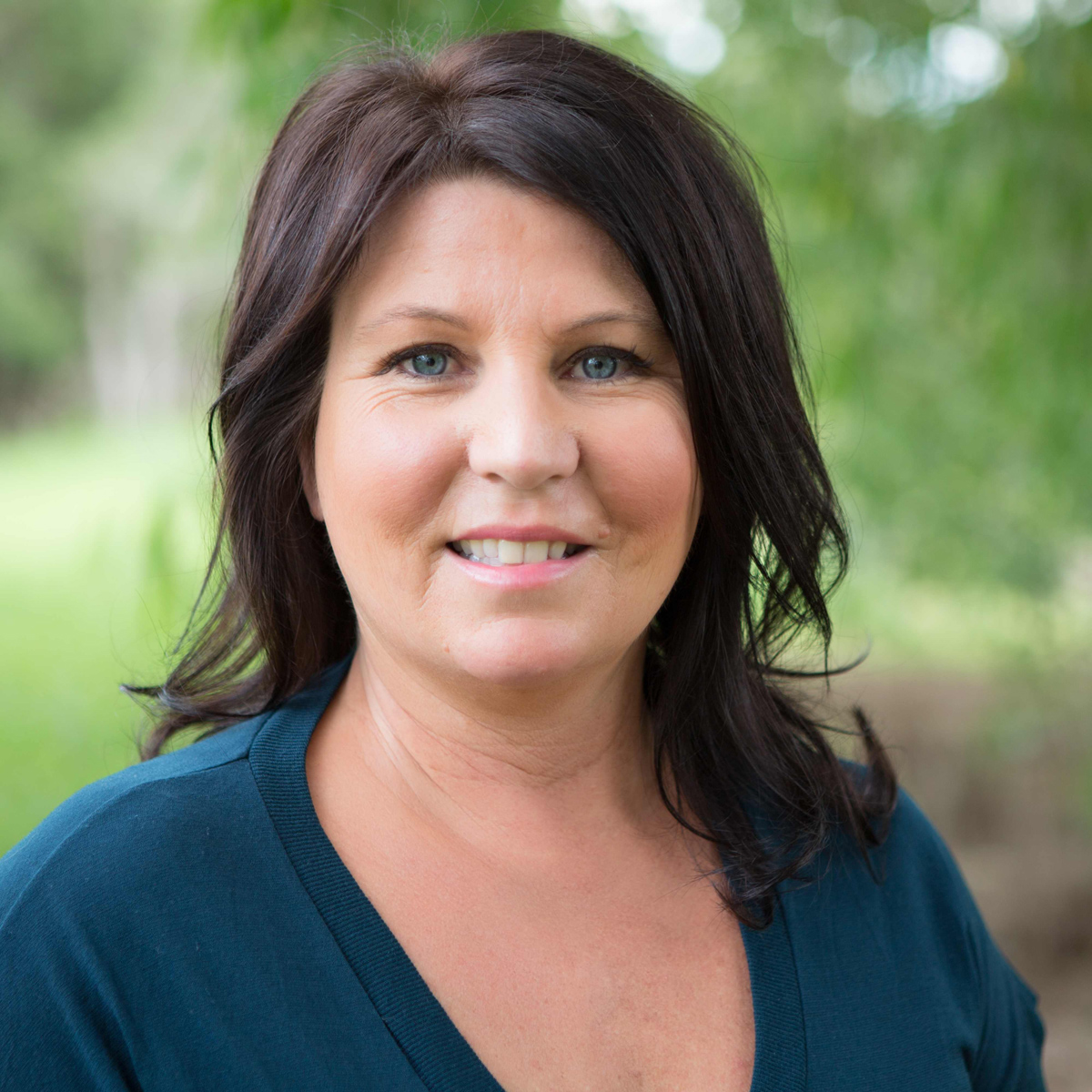
Tamara Smith, MLA for Ballina (2015–present)

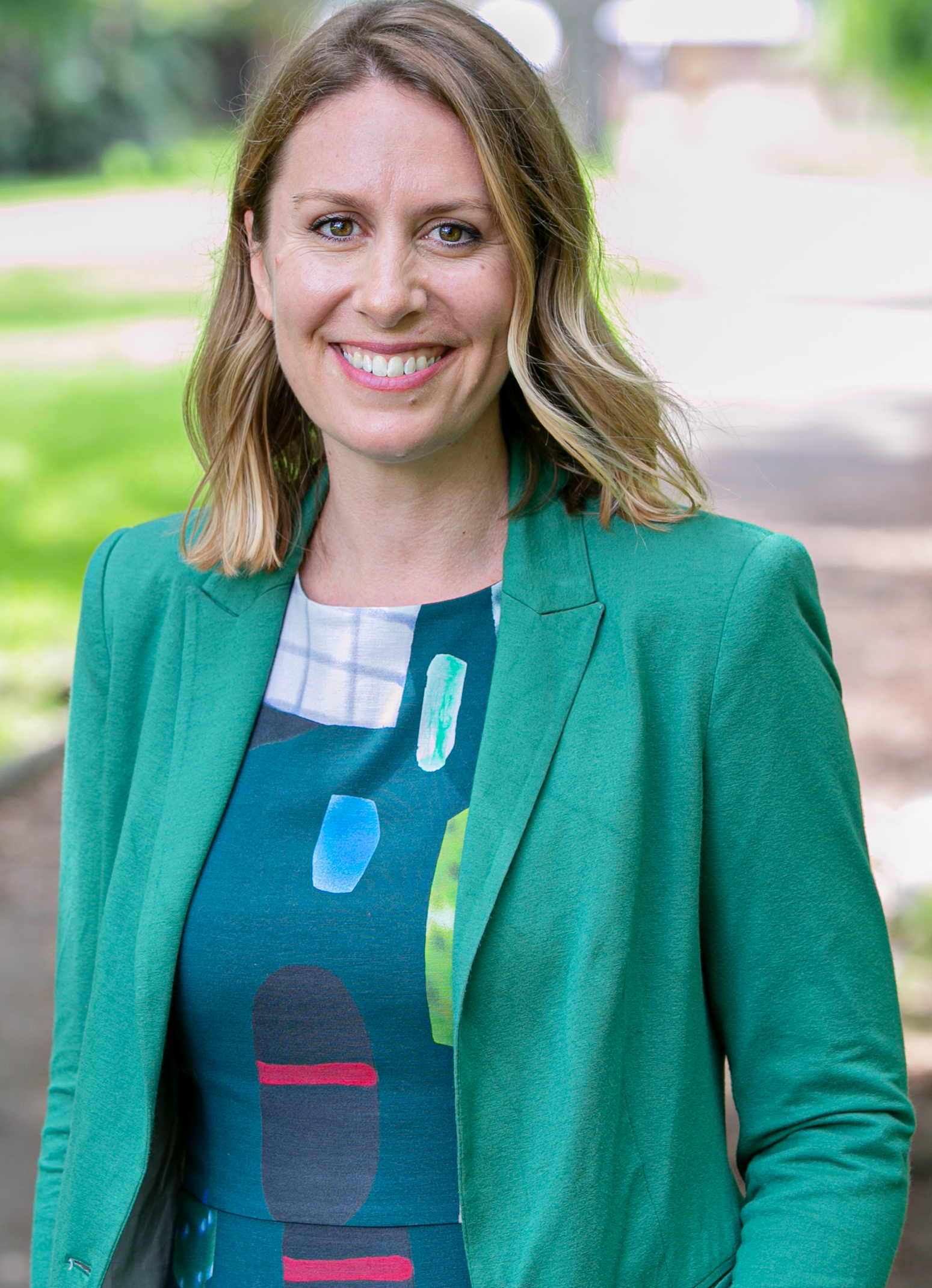
Kobi Shetty, MLA for Balmain (2023–present)

==== Legislative Council ====
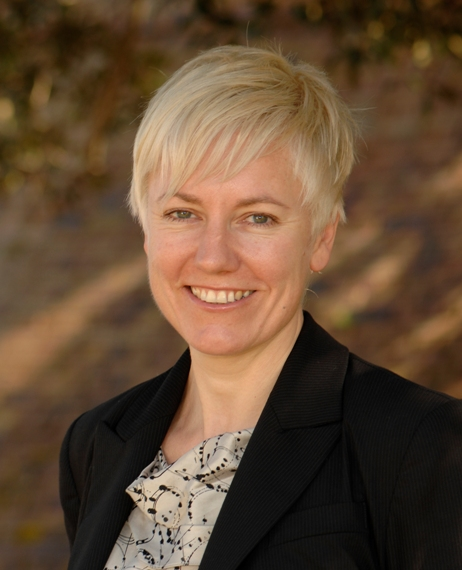
Cate Faehrmann MLC (2010–2013; 2018–present)

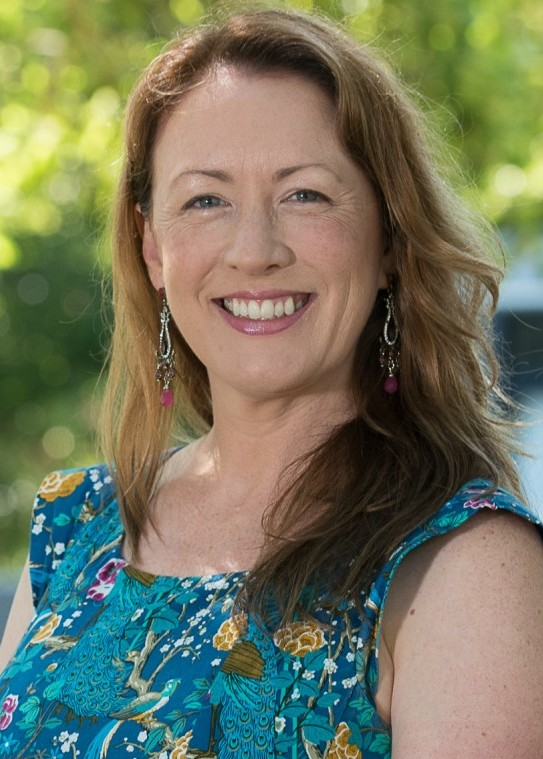
Abigail Boyd MLC (2019–present)

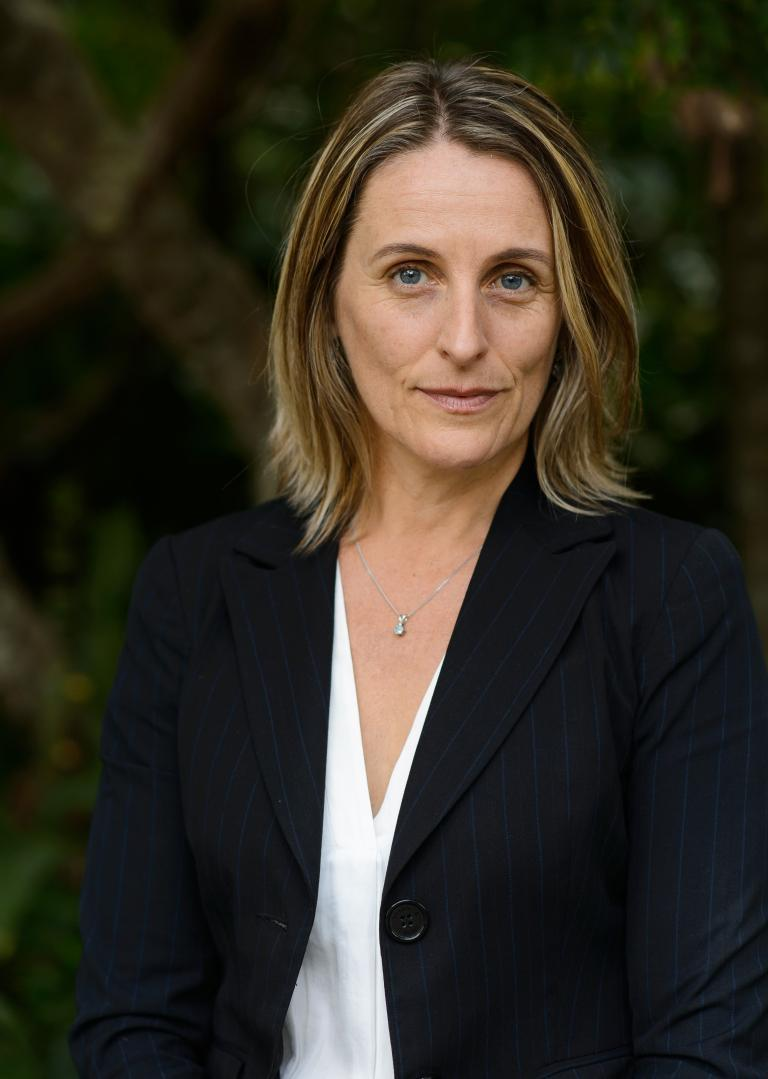
Sue Higginson MLC (2022–present)

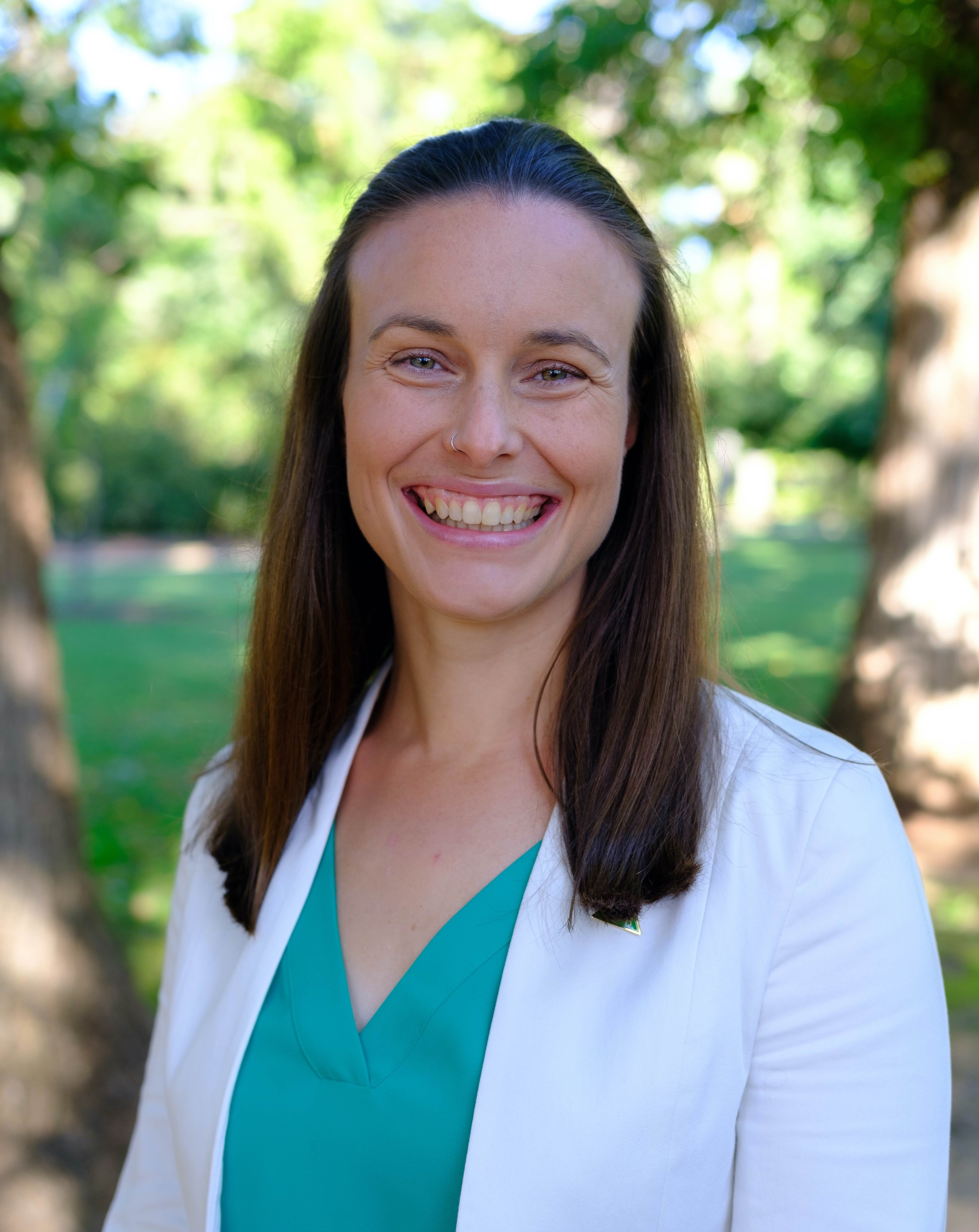
Amanda Cohn MLC (2023–present)

==== Former ====
- Ian Cohen MLC (1995–2011)
- Lee Rhiannon MLC (1999–2010)
- Sylvia Hale MLC (2003–2010)
- John Kaye MLC (2007–2016)
- David Shoebridge MLC (2010–2022)
- Jan Barham MLC (2011–2017)
- Jamie Parker, MLA for Balmain (2011–2023)
- Jeremy Buckingham MLC (2011–2018)
- Mehreen Faruqi MLC (2013–2018)
- Justin Field MLC (2016–2019) (Note: Field left the party mid term. He continued to sit in the Chamber.)
- Dawn Walker MLC (2017–2019)

== See also ==
- Left Renewal
