= Bob Brown =

Australian politician (born 1944)

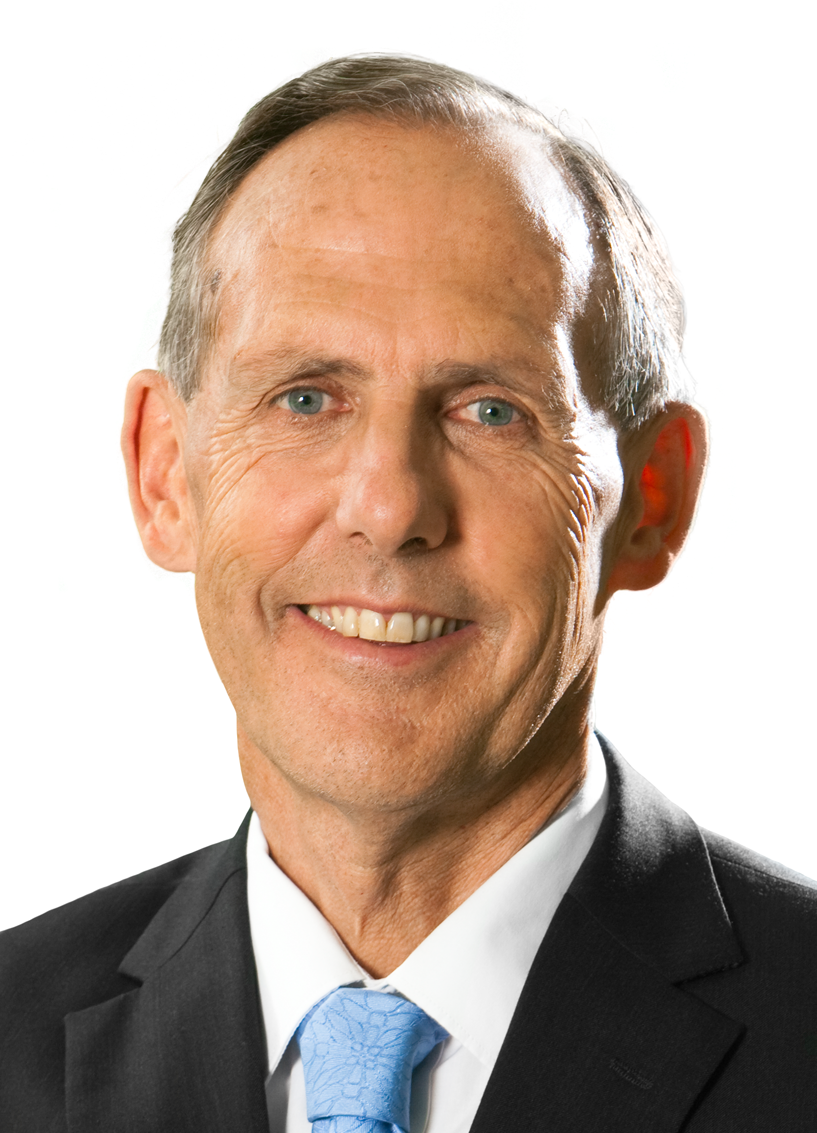
- Brown in 2010

Leader of the Australian Greens
- In office 28 November 2005 – 13 April 2012
- Deputy: Christine Milne
- Preceded by: No immediate predecessor
- Succeeded by: Christine Milne

Leader of the Australian Greens in Tasmania
- In office 13 May 1992 – 13 March 1993
- Deputy: Christine Milne
- Preceded by: Party established
- Succeeded by: Christine Milne

Senator for Tasmania
- In office 1 July 1996 – 15 June 2012
- Succeeded by: Peter Whish-Wilson

Member of the Tasmanian Parliament for Denison
- In office 4 January 1983 – 12 February 1993
- Preceded by: Norm Sanders
- Succeeded by: Peg Putt

Personal details
- Born: Robert James Brown; 27 December 1944 (age 81) Oberon, New South Wales, Australia
- Party: Greens (since 1992)
- Other political affiliations: Green Independents (1982–1992) (Note: Known until 1991 as 'The Independents'); United Tasmania Group (1970s)
- Domestic partner: Paul Thomas
- Education: Coffs Harbour High School; Blacktown Boys High School
- Alma mater: University of Sydney
- Occupation: General practitioner (Self-employed)
- Profession: Physician; Politician
- Website: bobbrown.org.au

Robert James Brown (born 27 December 1944) is an Australian former politician, medical doctor and environmentalist. He was a senator and the parliamentary leader of the Australian Greens. Brown was elected to the Australian Senate on the Tasmanian Greens ticket, joining with sitting Greens Western Australia senator Dee Margetts to form the first group of Australian Greens senators following the 1996 federal election. He was re-elected in 2001 and in 2007. He was the first openly gay member of the Parliament of Australia and the first openly gay leader of an Australian political party.

While serving in the Tasmanian parliament, Brown successfully campaigned for a large increase in the protected wilderness areas. Brown led the Australian Greens from the party's foundation in 1992 until April 2012, a period in which polls grew to around 10% at state and federal levels (13.1% of the primary vote in 2010). From 2002 to 2004, when minor parties held the balance of power in the Senate, Brown became a well-recognised politician. In October 2003 Brown was the subject of international media interest when he was suspended from the parliament for interjecting during an address by United States president George W. Bush.

On 13 April 2012, Brown resigned as leader of the Greens and indicated his intention to resign from the Senate in June. This occurred on 15 June 2012.

== Early life and education ==
Brown was born in Oberon, New South Wales, one of twins, and attended Trunkey Public School, Coffs Harbour High School (1957–60) and Blacktown Boys High School. In his senior year, he was elected school captain.

After finishing high school, Brown enrolled in medicine at University of Sydney, where he obtained a Bachelor of Medicine and Surgery degree.

In his early 20s, Brown was inspired by the then-Prime Minister Robert Menzies, and nearly joined the Liberal Party of Australia.

== Pre-parliamentary career ==
Brown practised medicine for a time at the Royal Canberra Hospital. During his tenure at the hospital, he and other senior medical staff took a pacifist stance by refusing to certify young men who did not wish to fight in the Vietnam War as fit to be conscripted. He then worked as a resident at Darwin and Alice Springs hospitals. At the latter post, he met John Hawkins, a surgeon who had kayaked rivers in Tasmania.

Brown travelled to London in 1970 and worked at Hounslow Cottage Hospital and St Mary Abbots Hospital in South Kensington. He was the resident doctor on duty at St Mary Abbots Hospital when Jimi Hendrix was brought in.

At the time of his retirement, many media outlets erroneously reported that he had pronounced Hendrix dead. Brown later clarified that, while he had been on duty when Hendrix was brought in, "he had been dead for some hours", and Hendrix was officially pronounced dead by a different doctor—who was, coincidentally, also an Australian.

Brown moved to Tasmania in 1972 and worked as a general practitioner in Launceston. He soon became involved in the state's environmental movement, in particular the campaign to save Lake Pedder. By 1972, he was a member of the newly formed United Tasmania Group, Australia's first "green" party. For a period of two years during the 1970s, Brown served time as a member of a Thylacine search team.

In 1976, he fasted for a week on top of Mt Wellington in protest against the arrival at Hobart of the nuclear-powered warship USS Enterprise.

== State politics ==
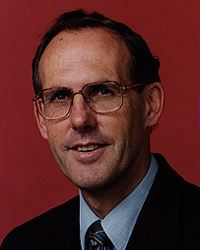
Brown after being elected to the Senate in the 1990s

In 1978 Brown was appointed director of the Tasmanian Wilderness Society. In the late 1970s he emerged as a leader of the campaign to prevent construction of the Franklin Dam, which would have flooded the Franklin River valley as part of a hydroelectricity project. Brown was among the 1500 people arrested while protesting during the campaign. He subsequently spent 19 days in Hobart's Risdon Prison. On the day of his release in 1983, he became a member of Tasmania's parliament for the House of Assembly seat of Denison after the Democrats MP Norm Sanders resigned to successfully stand for the Australian Senate; Brown was elected to replace him on a countback. The Franklin campaign was a success after Federal government intervention protected the Franklin River in 1983.

During his first term of office, Brown introduced a wide range of private member's initiatives, which include freedom of information, death with dignity, lowering parliamentary salaries, gay law reform, banning the battery-hen industry and advocation for nuclear free Tasmania. His 1987 bill to ban semi-automatic guns was voted down by both Liberal and Labor members of Tasmania's House of Assembly, nine years before the Port Arthur massacre resulted in a successful federal Liberal bid to achieve the same results.

In 1989 Tasmania's system of proportional representation allowed the Greens to win five out of 35 seats in the Tasmanian House of Assembly and Brown became their leader. (Note: In 1989, the Greens did not have formal leadership positions, but Brown's official senate biography lists his leadership of the state party from 1989–1993 as his first parliamentary party position.) He agreed to support a minority Labor Party government, on the basis of a negotiated Accord (signed by Michael Field and Bob Brown) in which the Green independents agreed to support the budget but not motions of no confidence, and the ALP agreed to develop a more open parliamentary process, to consult on departmental appointments, provide a legislative research service, parity in parliamentary staffing and a reform agenda which included equal opportunities, freedom of information, national parks protection and public disclosure of bulk power contracts and royalties from mining companies. This agreement, however, broke down over forestry issues in 1992. In 1993 Brown resigned from the House of Assembly and stood unsuccessfully for the federal House of Representatives.

During 1990–1991 Brown advocated for a merger of the Green Independents with the Australian Democrats to form the "Green Democrats", as opposed to confederating with other Green Parties and forming the Australian Greens. However, following a change in leadership in the Democrats, this plan could not continue and the Independents aligned themselves towards a unified Green Party.

== Federal politics ==
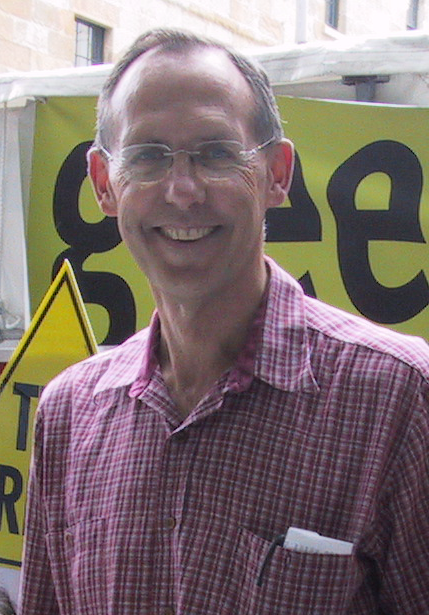
Brown at Salamanca Market in Tasmania in December 2004

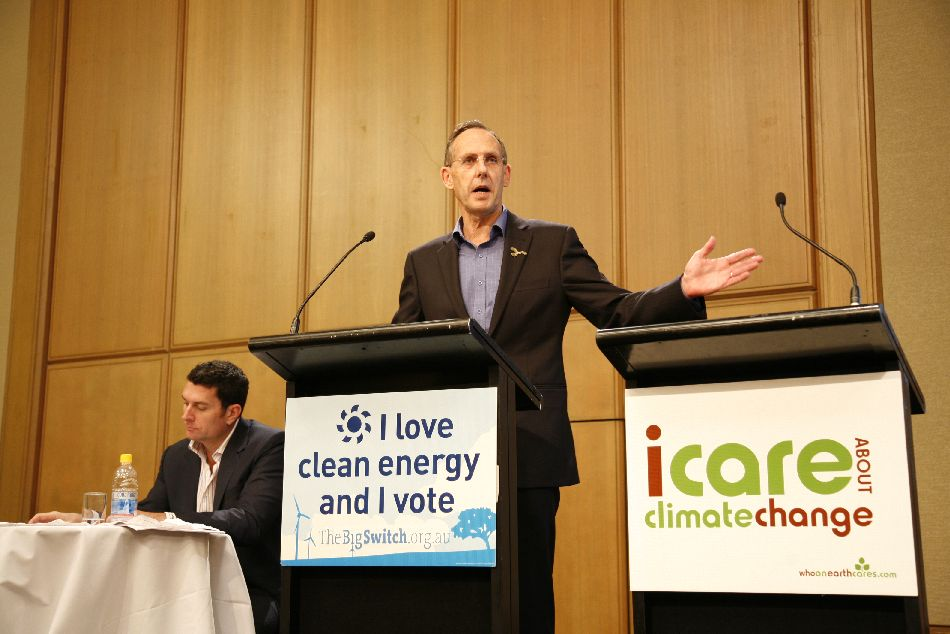
Brown lays out the Greens' climate change policies in the lead-up to the 2007 federal election

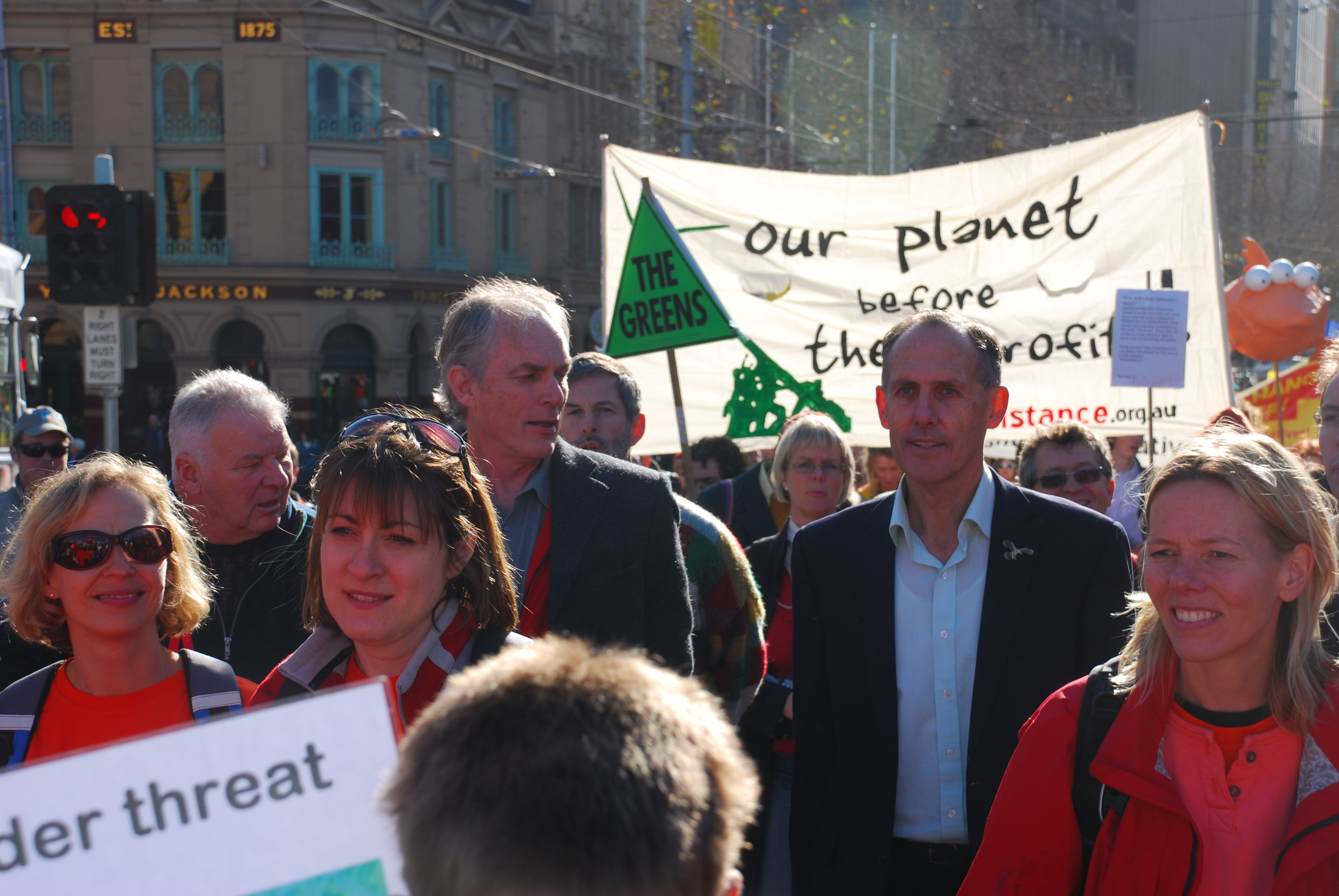
Brown at a climate change rally in Melbourne on 5 July 2008

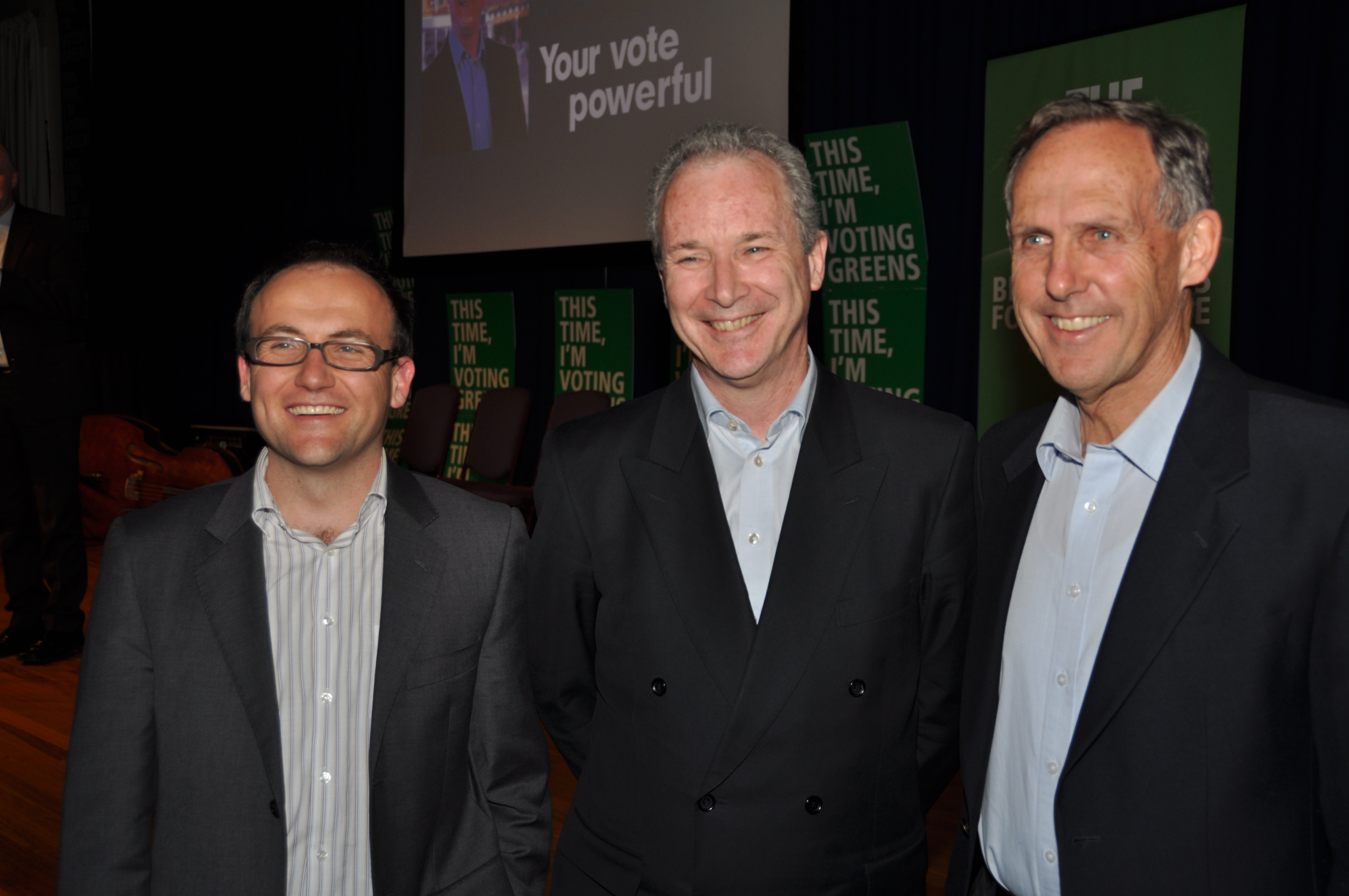
Adam Bandt, Brian Walters and Brown during the campaign for the 2010 Victorian state election

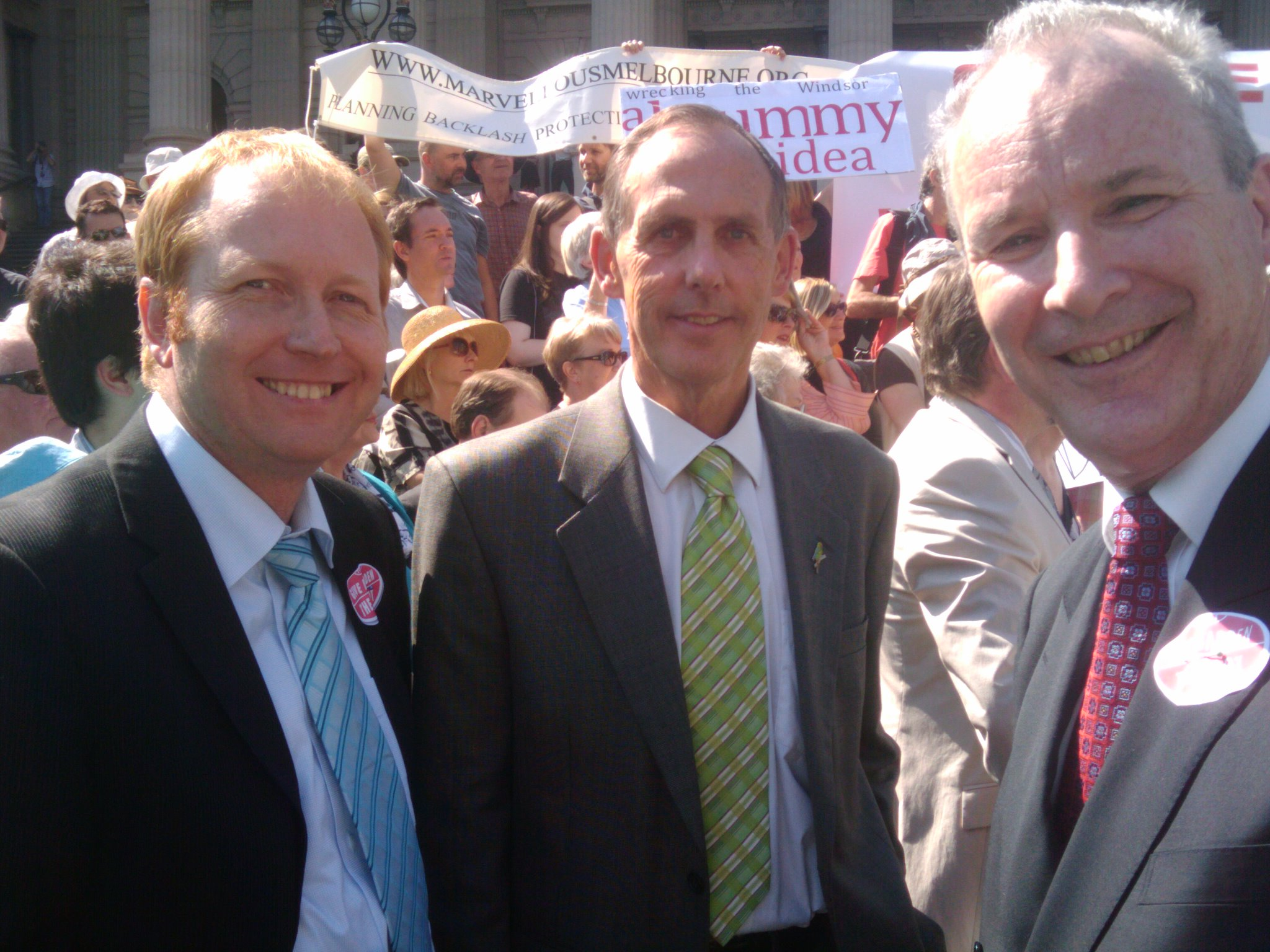
Greg Barber, Brown and Brian Walters attending a protest rally in Melbourne in 2010

Brown was elected to the Australian Senate for Tasmania in 1996, and was an outspoken voice in opposition to the conservative government of John Howard, and in support of green and human rights issues, including international issues such as Tibet, East Timor and West Papua. He also introduced bills for constitutional reform, forest protection, to block radioactive waste dumping, to ban mandatory sentencing of Aboriginal children, to prohibit the use of cluster munitions and for greenhouse abatement.

At the 2001 federal election Brown was re-elected to the Senate with a greatly increased vote, and was outspoken on Prime Minister John Howard's refusal to allow 438 asylum seekers (mostly from Afghanistan) to land on Christmas Island after they had been rescued from their sinking boat in the Indian Ocean by the MV Tampa, a Norwegian freighter. Brown was equally critical of Opposition Leader Kim Beazley's acquiescence to John Howard's stance on the Tampa incident.

Brown was particularly vocal in his opposition to Australian participation in the 2003 invasion of Iraq and became recognised as a leading voice for the anti-war movement. When United States President George W. Bush visited Canberra on 23 October 2003, Brown and fellow senator Kerry Nettle interjected during his address to a joint sitting of the two houses of parliament. During Bush's speech Brown and Nettle wore signs referring to David Hicks and Mamdouh Habib, two Australian citizens held at Guantánamo Bay, Cuba, at that time (Habib was later released without charge and Hicks served a prison term for providing material support for terrorism), following their apprehension by United States forces in Afghanistan and Pakistan respectively. Bush accepted the interjections with good humour but the Speaker of the House, Neil Andrew formally "named" Brown and Nettle. This meant that they were both suspended from the Parliament for 24 hours which prevented them from being present during a similar address from Chinese President Hu Jintao the next day. After the speech, however, Brown shook Bush's hand.

Brown opposed the Howard Government's amendments to the Marriage Act in 2004, stating that "Mr Howard should relax and accept gay marriages as part of the future's social fabric".

In December 2004, forestry and export woodchip company Gunns Limited attempted to sue Brown and others for $6.3 million, in an action which media reports say related to "ongoing damaging campaigns and activities" against the company. The original Statement of Claim issued by Gunns was struck out by the Supreme Court and costs were awarded against Gunns for the initial proceedings. Gunns ultimately failed with the company finally dropping all claims against Brown on 13 December 2006 while continuing its case against others including The Wilderness Society.

Brown was formally elected as the first Federal Parliamentary Leader of the Greens on 28 November 2005, following almost a decade of service as de facto leader since his election to the Senate in 1996.

In February 2007, the Tasmanian State Government and the Australian Federal Government responded by changing the text of the State's Regional Forest Agreement. New clauses make it clear that the word 'protection' relates only to whether the two respective governments deem a species to be protected rather than the meaning of the word being based on actual evidence of such.

In early 2007, Brown attracted scorn from sections of the media and the major political parties for his proposal to commit to a plan within three years, that would eventually see the banning of coal exports. Brown described coal exports as the "energy industry's heroin habit" and stated that the export of alternative technologies should be the priority.

Brown was re-elected in the 2007 federal election. He announced his intention to stand again at the Greens National Conference in November 2005.

Following his re-election and that of the new Labor Government, Brown called on the new Prime Minister, Kevin Rudd, to set fixed carbon targets immediately, and to announce their levels at the upcoming United Nations Bali Climate Change Conference in December 2007, continuing his climate campaigning, and saying that it was "obvious" what the outcome would be if Australia was to not set carbon emissions goals.

In 2005, Brown brought a legal case against Forestry Tasmania in the Federal Court, in an attempt to protect Tasmania's Wielangta forest from clearfell logging. The 1997 Tasmanian Regional Forest Agreement (RFA) exempted logging operations from endangered species laws but required the protection of endangered species. Bob Brown brought a case against Forestry Tasmania citing threats to endangered species like the swift parrot and Wielangta stag beetle. In December 2006, Judge Shane Marshall awarded the case in Brown's favour. On appeal to the full bench of the Federal Court level, the case was lost, without rejecting the earlier judgement that logging would further endanger these species. In May 2008 the High Court denied leave to appeal that decision after the wording of the RFA was changed.

Brown was ordered to pay $240,000 to Forestry Tasmania, which he said he could not afford to pay. Failure to pay would have resulted in bankruptcy proceedings which would have cost Brown his Senate seat. Brown had earlier rejected a settlement offer from Forestry Tasmania that would have required him to have only paid $200,000 of the costs he had incurred. On 9 June 2009, Australian entrepreneur Dick Smith promised to help bail him out if necessary, an offer that was not needed after pledges of support from over 1,000 donors covered Brown's legal bill within a few days of his announcement.

In 2011, after the 2010–11 Queensland floods Brown drew criticism for suggesting that half the Mineral Resource Rent Tax be allocated to future natural catastrophes. He made comments to the effect that climate change, specifically the impact on climate from the mining sector should be held at least partially responsible for the flooding.

In 2011, Brown supported the 2011 military intervention in Libya.

On 24 March 2012, at the 40th anniversary of the establishment of the Tasmanian Greens, Brown warned about degradation of the Earth and the impact that could have on future generations. He postulated that other civilisations in the universe are:

not communicating with Earth. They have extincted themselves. They have come and gone. And now it's our turn.

As a possible approach to pre-empting this he proposed a Global Parliament. He was met with a standing ovation. The then deputy leader Christine Milne said it was "a very inspiring speech". There was criticism of his approach. At the Global Greens Conference in Dakar, Senegal Africa, 1 April 2012, Bob Brown advocated that there be established a "global parliament" where "every citizen should have an equal say". The final resolution supported by the Australian Greens and others, was passed.

=== Resignation from Greens leadership ===
On 13 April 2012, Brown resigned as leader of the Greens and announced that he would be resigning from the Senate in June when his replacement was available. His deputy, Christine Milne, became Greens leader, and federal Melbourne MP Adam Bandt became Greens deputy leader. Peter Whish-Wilson, who had formerly stood for the Greens, was selected as Brown's replacement in the Senate.

Brown's resignation took place on 15 June 2012 at 3:30 pm, when he handed his resignation to the senate president, John Hogg. Peter Whish-Wilson was sworn into the Senate on 21 June.

== Bush Heritage Australia ==
Brown was the founder, in 1990, of the Australian Bush Heritage Fund, now Bush Heritage Australia, a non-profit environmental organisation dedicated to purchasing and preserving Australian bushland. He was president of the organisation until 1996. On 20 March 2011 Brown donated a 14-hectare (35-acre) property and house he had owned for 38 years to Bush Heritage Australia. The property is located 47 kilometres (29 miles) south-west of Launceston, Tasmania, in the Liffey Valley. According to Australian Geographic, it is a site of historic and symbolic significance.

== Bob Brown Foundation ==
Brown set up the Bob Brown Foundation with his longtime partner Paul Thomas to promote environmental awareness. The foundation established a set of awards in 2012, with South Australian climate activist Daniel Spencer the recipient of the inaugural Young Environmentalist of the Year award, and Tasmanian forest activist Jenny Weber was inaugural Environmentalist of the Year, which came with a prize of A$4,000. It has also given awards to other Australian environmentalists, including Miranda Gibson and Drew Hutton.

== Other activities ==
Brown is a supporter of the Campaign for the Establishment of a United Nations Parliamentary Assembly, an organisation which advocates for democratic reformation of the United Nations.

Brown was a speaker at the Save the Kimberley concert, held on 5 October 2012. Held at Federation Square in Melbourne, the concert was part of a long-running campaign to protest against a proposal to industrialise the James Price Point area in Broome, Western Australia. Brown had also addressed a rally on 2 September 2012 in Sydney, Australia. Brown appeared at another concert in support of the Kimberley cause on 24 February 2013, with musicians Missy Higgins and John Butler also appearing, with the event held at The Esplanade in Fremantle, Western Australia. Jarrah Records, the record label that Butler co-founded with musical trio The Waifs and band manager Phil Stevens, worked in partnership with The Wilderness Society to stage the free event that also featured the band Ball Park Music. A march to protest the proposed gas refinery construction at James Price Point accompanied the free concert and campaign supporters were photographed with banners and placards.

On 8 January 2013, it was announced that Brown would be taking over as director of the Australian chapter of Sea Shepherd Conservation Society, a non-profit, marine conservation organisation. He stepped down in April 2014.

In January 2016, Brown was arrested after refusing to leave the Lapoinya Forest in Tasmania, where preparations for logging were under way. Along with another protester, who had been arrested a few days earlier, he was charged with an offence under Tasmania's Workplaces (Protection from Protesters) Act 2014. Although the charges were dropped, the two went to the High Court to argue that the provisions under which they had been charged were unconstitutional. In October 2017 the High Court agreed, by a majority although for differing reasons, that the provisions were invalid in that they breached the constitutional freedom of political communication.

In August 2016, Brown joined the crew of Sea Shepherd on board their ship Steve Irwin, as it joined the campaign against proposed drilling in the Great Australian Bight.

In April 2019 Brown led a convoy of vehicles to protest against the proposed Carmichael coal mine.

In July 2019 Brown opposed a large wind farm to be set up in Northern Tasmania, raising concern for bird species.

== Recognition and awards ==
In 1983, Brown was the subject of an Archibald Prize-finalist painting in psychedelic style by Harold "the Kangaroo" Thornton, titled Dr Brown and Green Old Time Waltz. It documented the Gordon below Franklin Scheme, and is a rare example of an historically-themed artwork in Australia. Thornton had travelled to Tasmania to assist the Greens.

In July 2012, Brown was inducted into the Hall of Fame at Coffs Harbour High School, where he had spent a significant part of his secondary school years.

Brown has received the following awards:

- The Australian newspaper's "Australian of the Year" (1983)
- IUCN Packard Award (1984)
- UNEP Global 500 Roll of Honour (1987)
- Goldman Environmental Prize (1990)
- MAPW Distinguished Physician Award (1990)
- BBC Wildlife magazine's "World's Most Inspiring Politician"(1996)
- Australian Living Treasure, by of the National Trust (1998)
- Rainforest Action Network Environmental Hero (2006)
- Australian Peace Prize (2009)
- Australian Humanist of the Year (2010)
- Bettison & James Award, at the Adelaide Film Festival, which is awarded to recognised "the lifetime work of an exemplary Australian", and was awarded for Brown's "longstanding and critical work across many areas of benefit to the community, especially in regard to the environment and action on climate change"

=== Documentary film ===
The 2023 documentary film The Giants is described as a "poetic portrait" of Brown's 50-year activism, and integrates his experiences with the life cycle of the forests. It screened at many film festivals, won awards, and was the inspiration for a fresh set of environmental activist rallies. The film, which was written, directed, and produced by Rachael Antony and Laurence Billiet, was screened at the 2022 Adelaide Film Festival Sherwin Akbarzadeh won the AACTA Award for Best Cinematography in a Documentary in 2024 for the film,

The film was screened by Museums Victoria in May 2026, followed by a Q&A with Brown and the filmmakers. It is as of September 2026 available for viewing via SBS on Demand in Australia.

== Personal life ==
In a newspaper interview in 1976, Brown announced that he had a same-sex partner to highlight discrimination and encourage law reform because homosexual activity in Tasmania remained a crime until 1997.

As of 2018, Brown lived in Eggs and Bacon Bay, Tasmania, with his long-time partner, Paul Thomas, a farmer and activist whom he met in 1996.

Brown describes himself as a "lapsed Presbyterian".

In an interview with Richard Fidler on ABC radio, Nigel Brennan, an Australian photojournalist who was kidnapped in Somalia and held hostage for 462 days, revealed Brown had contributed $100,000 of his own money to help pay the ransom for his release. It was also revealed that Brown contacted Australian businessman Dick Smith asking that he also contribute funds towards the release of Brennan. Brennan, who was released in November 2009, also stated in this interview that Brown had to borrow this money, an assertion also made in various media outlets at the time of Brennan's release.

== Publications ==
Brown has published several books including Wild Rivers (1983), Lake Pedder (1986), Tarkine Trails (1994), The Greens (1996) (with Peter Singer), Memo for a Saner World (2004), Valley of the Giants (2004), Tasmania's Recherche Bay (2005), Earth (2009), In Balfour Street (2010), Optimism: Reflections on a Life of Action (2014),Thera (2023) and Defiance: Stories from Nature and Its Defenders (2025).

He has collaborated with, or supported work of Geoff Law.

In 2004 James Norman published the first authorised biography of Brown, entitled Bob Brown: A Gentle Revolutionary.

== Notes ==
Party political offices
New office	Federal Parliamentary Leader of the Australian Greens; 2005 (de facto since 1996)–2012	Succeeded by Christine Milne
New office	Leader of the Tasmanian Greens; 1989 (de facto)–1993	Succeeded by Christine Milne
