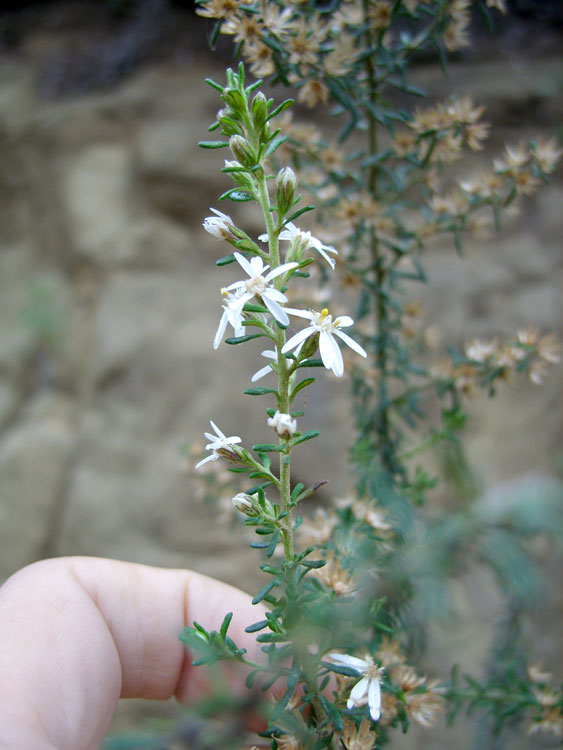
- In the Wielangta Forest Reserve

Scientific classification
- Kingdom: Plantae
- Clade: Tracheophytes
- Clade: Angiosperms
- Clade: Eudicots
- Clade: Asterids
- Order: Asterales
- Family: Asteraceae
- Genus: Olearia
- Species: O. ericoides

Binomial name
- Olearia ericoides (Steetz) N.A.Wakef.

Synonyms
- Aster hookeri F.Muell.; Eurybia cricoides Steetz orth. var.; Eurybia ericoides Steetz; Shawia ericoides (Steetz) Sch.Bip.

= Olearia ericoides =

Species of shrub

Olearia ericoides is a species of flowering plant in the family Asteraceae and is endemic to Tasmania. It is a slender shrub with oblong leaves and white and yellow, daisy-like inflorescences.

== Description ==
Olearia ericoides is a slender, small to medium-sized, glabrous shrub. The stems and leaves are shining and sticky, the leaves oblong to narrowly linear, mostly 3–5 mm (0.12–0.20 in) long and sessile with the edges rolled under. The heads or daisy-like "flowers" are arranged singly on the ends of long and short branchlets and are sessile. The fruit is a reddish achene with rigid bristles.

== Taxonomy ==
This species was first formally described in 1856 by Joachim Steetz who gave it the name Eurybia ericoides in Johann Georg Christian Lehmann's Plantae Preissianae from specimens collected by Theodor Siemssen near Hobart in 1837.

In 1956, Norman Wakefield changed the name to Olearia ericoides in The Victorian Naturalist.

The specific epithet (ericoides) means "Erica-like".

== Distribution and habitat ==
Olearia ericoides grows on dry hillsides in the south and south-east of Tasmania.
