= Coffs Harbour Senior College =

Location
- Hogbin Drive, Coffs Harbour, Mid North Coast, New South Wales; Australia; 30°19′34″S 153°06′04″E

Information
- Type: Government-funded co-educational comprehensive senior secondary day school
- Established: 1995; 31 years ago
- School district: Coffs Harbour; Regional North
- Educational authority: NSW Department of Education
- Director: Sam Hutton
- Teaching staff: 39.8 FTE (2018)
- Years: 11–12
- Enrolment: 467 (2018)
- Campus: Coffs Harbour Education Campus
- Campus type: Regional
- Colours: Purple and jade
- Slogan: A Unique Learning Environment for your HSC
- Affiliations: TAFE NSW; Southern Cross University
- Website: coffsharbs-h.schools.nsw.gov.au

Coffs Harbour Senior College is a government-funded co-educational comprehensive senior secondary day school, located within the Coffs Harbour Education Campus, on Hogbin Drive, Coffs Harbour, on the Mid North Coast region of New South Wales, Australia. The aboriginal country the school is built on is Gumbaynggirr Country.

Established in 1995, the college enrolled approximately 470 students in 2018, in Year 11 and Year 12, including three percent of students who identified as Indigenous Australians and six percent who were from a language background other than English. The school is operated by the NSW Department of Education; the principal is Sam Hutton PSM.

== Overview ==
The college is affiliated with TAFE NSW and Southern Cross University on one site known as Coffs Harbour Education Campus (CHEC). The college provides opportunities for students in Years 11 and 12 to study in an adult learning environment and to gain the NSW Higher School Certificate.

=== Campus ===
The Coffs Harbour Education Campus is a partnership between the Southern Cross University, TAFE NSW and the NSW Department of Education. The comprehensive joint facility offers enrolment in articulated education and training programmes of each of the partners, ranging from Year 11 to postgraduate level. There are no sectoral boundaries between facilities on the campus; all are jointly owned and utilised as appropriate by the three partners. Students from Southern Cross, TAFE and the Senior College share the facilities. Classes from all sectors operate on an integrated timetable and the staff from all three sectors have offices in a shared environment.

== See also ==
- List of government schools in New South Wales: A–F
- List of schools in the Northern Rivers and Mid North Coast
- Education in Australia
- Coffs Harbour High School
