= Geoff Law =

Australian author

- Occupations: Conservationist, environmentalist
- Organisation: The Wilderness Society

Geoff Law is a Tasmanian author, conservationist and environmental activist. He is author of works about conservation and environment in Tasmania.

Law has campaigned for wilderness and conservation causes in the West and South West Tasmania for over thirty years.

In 2002, Law was awarded the Wild magazine Environmentalist of the Year award. Law become a Member of the Order of Australia for his work to protect Tasmania's outstanding natural environment in 2013.

Law has collaborated with Bob Brown. Also each has paid the other compliments publicly.

Law has also been acclaimed for his activism.

Law has also written of the threats to wilderness in western and south western Tasmania.
