= Wielangta forest =

Forest in Tasmania, Australia

Coordinates: 42°40′S 147°50′E

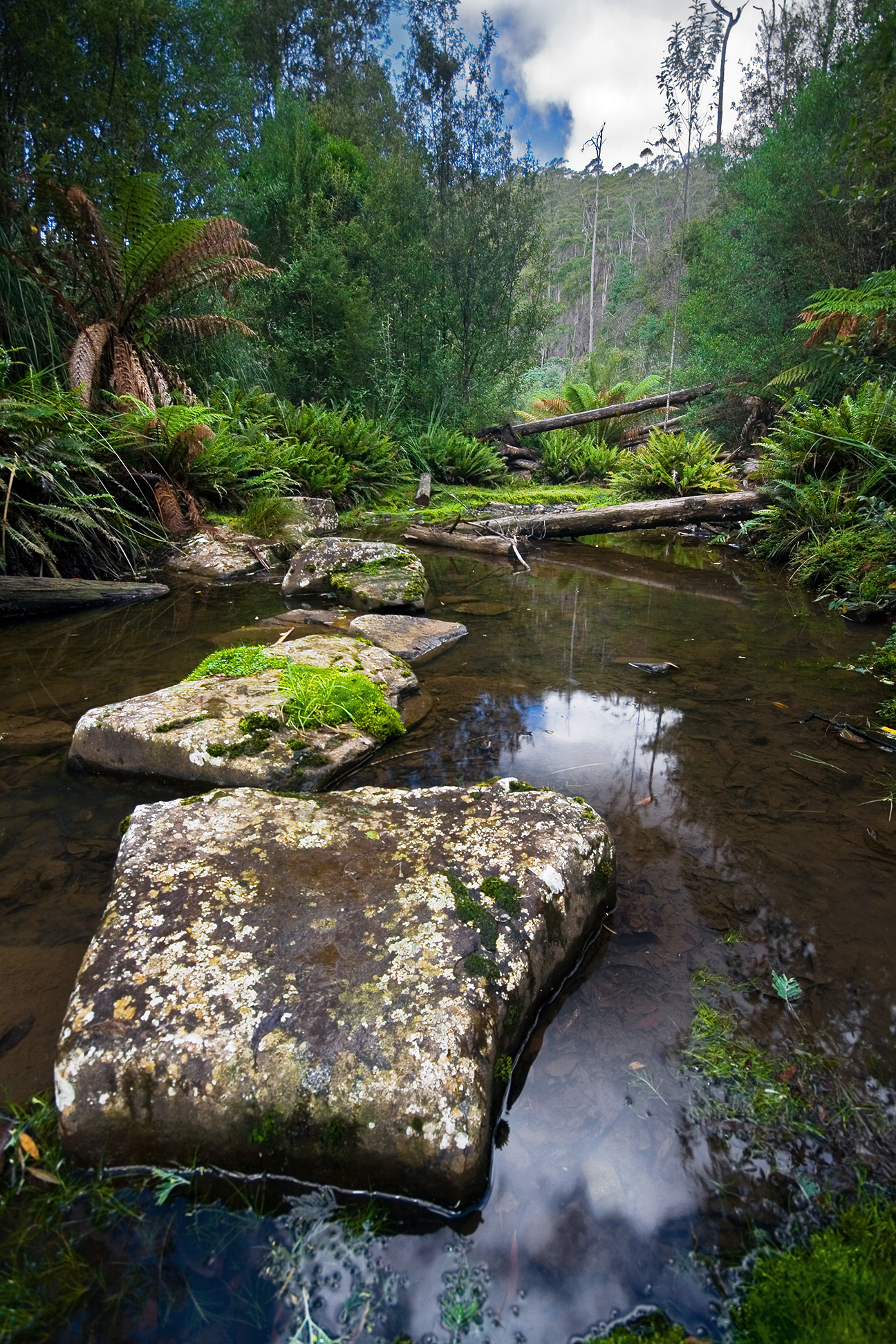
The Sandspit River in a cool temperate rainforest area

The Wielangta forest is in south-east Tasmania, Australia. It is notable for its role in a 2006 court case that called into question the effectiveness of Australia's cooperative Commonwealth-State forest management regime known as Regional Forest Agreements.

== Name ==
Wielangta is an Aboriginal name of high trees.

== Environment ==
The Wielangta forest is part of remnant glacial refugia forest and contains blue gum eucalypt forest and pockets of cool temperate rainforest. The forest is a key habitat of rare and threatened species, including the Tasmanian wedge-tailed eagle, swift parrot, Wielangta stag beetle, spotted-tail quoll and eastern barred bandicoot. A rare orchid (Genoplesium nudum) has also been discovered in the forest. The forest forms part of the South-east Tasmania Important Bird Area, identified as such by BirdLife International because of its importance in the conservation of a range of woodland birds.

== Logging controversy ==
The forest is under the control of Forestry Tasmania, with logging being allowed. The logging of the forest has been contentious due to the impact on rare and threatened species. Environmentalists called for the Wielangta forest area to be incorporated into a broader reserve offering full protection to environmental and biodiversity values. Some parts of Wielangta were granted formal protection in the recent Supplementary Regional Forest Agreement (Tasmania).

In 2006 Australian Greens Senator, Bob Brown, took the issue of Forestry Tasmania's failure to protect endangered species in Wielangta to the Federal Court, particularly the Tasmanian wedge-tailed eagle, broad-toothed stag beetle and swift parrot. His case was initially successful, establishing that forestry activities were impacting on those species, but an appeal by Forestry Tasmania on the interpretation of a part of the agreement was successful. In February 2007, the Tasmanian State Government and the Australian Federal Government responded by changing the text of the State's Regional Forest Agreement and making further legal appeals pointless. The new clauses make it clear that the word 'protection' relates only to whether the two respective governments deem a species to be protected rather than the meaning of the word being based on actual evidence of such (see 2006-2007 Legal Proceedings).

In June 2009 Brown received a bill from Forestry Tasmania for the costs of the case and of the appeals. After a public appeal for assistance he declared he would be able to make the payment by the deadline and not risk losing his seat in the Australian Senate.

== 2006-2007 Legal Proceedings ==
In Brown v Forestry Tasmania (No 4) [2006] FCA 1729, the applicant (Senator Bob Brown) sought a prohibitive injunction under s 475 Environment Protection and Biodiversity Conservation Act 1999 (Cth) (EPBC) to restrain the respondent (Forestry Tasmania) from undertaking forestry operations in the Wielangta Forest. The applicant also sought the following declarations:

- (1) that the Tasmanian Regional Forest Agreement 1997 (RFA) is not a regional forest agreement within the meaning of the EPBC Act and the Regional Forest Agreements Act 2002 (Cth) (‘RFA Act’);
- (2) that Forestry Tasmania's forestry operations in the Wielangta Forest are likely to have a significant impact [for the purpose of s 12(1) EPBC] on:
  - the broad-toothed stag beetle;
  - the wedge-tailed eagle; and
  - the swift parrot;
- (3) that Forestry Tasmania's forestry operations in the Wielangta Forest have not been undertaken in accordance with the RFA; and
- (4) that Forestry Tasmania's forestry operations in the Wielangta Forest will not, under the present forest practices system in Tasmania, be undertaken in accordance with the RFA.

At [91] – in relation to significant impact under the EPBC – Marshall J endorses Black CJ, Ryan J, Finn J’s interpretation of impact in Minister for the Environment and Heritage v Queensland Conservation Council Inc [2004] FCAFC 190 (‘Nathan Dam’), which embraces both direct and indirect consequences of an action. Consequently, the indirect or cumulative effects of forestry were found to have a significant impact on the beetle, eagle, and parrot due to, inter alia, loss of habitat.

Regarding the first declaration sought by Brown, s 38(1) EPBC states:

Part 3 [requirements for environmental approvals] does not apply to an RFA forestry operation that is undertaken in accordance with an RFA.

Consequently, the declaration would require Forestry Tasmania to seek environmental approval under the EPBC for forestry operations in the area.

Marshall J observed that the Forestry Tasmania was an RFA for the purpose of the EPBC – and that the operations under the RFA were exempt by operation of s 38(1) if they are undertaken in accordance with the RFA.

Clause 68 of the RFA required Forestry Tasmania to protect the beetle, eagle and parrot through a CAR Reserve System (CAR), which was described in the RFA as:

[areas] where the CAR values are protected under secure management arrangement by agreement with private landholders. This reserve system is based on the principles of comprehensiveness, adequacy and representativeness, as described in the JANIS Report.

At [240]-[241] – Marshall J considers the meaning of protection for the purpose of the RFA:

An agreement to ‘protect’ means exactly what it says. It is not an agreement to attempt to protect, or to consider the possibility of protecting, a threatened species. … The method for achieving that protection is through the CAR Reserve System or by applying relevant management prescriptions. Does that mean the State's obligations are satisfied if, in fact, the CAR Reserve System or relevant management prescriptions do not protect the relevant species? I do not think so. If the CAR Reserve System does not deliver protection to the species, the agreement to protect is empty (in the absence of relevant management prescriptions performing that role). If relevant management prescriptions do not perform that role, the State should ensure that it does, otherwise it is not complying with its obligation to protect the species. To construe cl 68 otherwise would be to turn it into an empty promise.

Marshall J, upon examination of expert evidence, found that – as a matter of fact – the CAR did not protect the three species.

Marshall J granted declarations (2)-(4) and the injunction restraining Forestry Tasmania’s forestry operations in the area. However, the decision was reversed by Sundberg J, Finkelstein J, and Dowsett J in Forestry Tasmania v Brown [2007] FCAFC 186.

At [62]-[63], their honours consider the Revised Explanatory Memorandum of the RFA Act and conclude that:

satisfactory performance of the State's obligations can only be measured by the parties, the sanction for inadequate performance by the State (in the Commonwealth's opinion) being termination of the agreement under cl 102 [of the RFA].

Consequently, their honours conclude that the EPBC is not applicable to areas subject to an RFA – which is intended to represent an agreed framework of ecologically sustainable development. Therefore, parties to the RFA have agreed that the duty of protecting the beetle, eagle and parrot under the RFA can be discharged by adhering to the CAR – regardless of whether, as a matter of fact, adherence to the CAR does not adequately protect these species. In substance, their honours have contradicted Marshall J’s statement in Brown v Forestry Tasmania (No 4) at [241]:

If relevant management prescriptions do not perform that role, the State should ensure that it does, otherwise it is not complying with its obligation to protect the species.

Clause 68 of the RAF was amended on 23 February 2007 to:

The parties agree that the CAR Reserve System, established in accordance with this Agreement, and the application of management strategies and management prescriptions developed under Tasmania's Forest Management Systems, protect rare and threatened fauna and flora species and Forest Communities.

Consequently, their honours were satisfied that adherence to the CAR amounts to protection of the beetle, eagle, and parrot for the purpose of the RAF – thereby allowing Forestry Tasmania to continue logging operations where – as a matter of fact – those operations have a significant impact on protected species under the EPBC.

== Wielangta tram ==
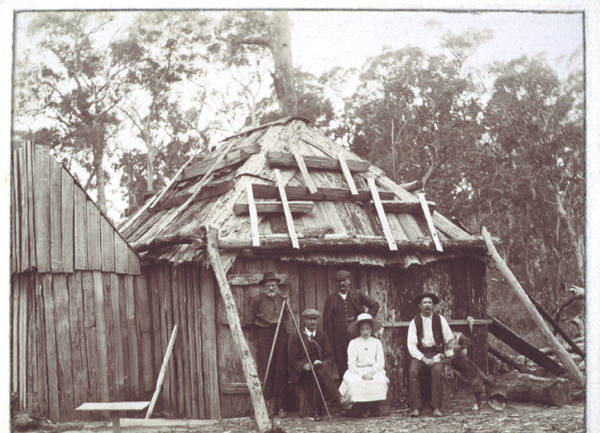
Pioneers at a hut in Wielangta Forest, around 1910

The Wielangta tram was a more than 6.5 kilometres (4 mi) long forest railway, which ran on steel and wooden rails along the Sandspit River from the Wielangta forest to the sawmills in the Wielangta settlement and from there to the east coast opposite of Maria Island, where the sawn timber was loded onto ships via a pier on Rheban beach south of Orford. Its steam locomotive had been built by Russell Allport & Co in Hobart.

In its heyday Wielangta had several sawmills, a general store, a bakery, a blacksmith and a school. The sawmill settlement was inhabited by about a hundred pioneers. They worked there from 1911 to 1924, before the sawmill was closed due to the lack of wood in the area and the workers moved on. The settlement was devastated by bushfires in the 1920s and abandoned in 1928.

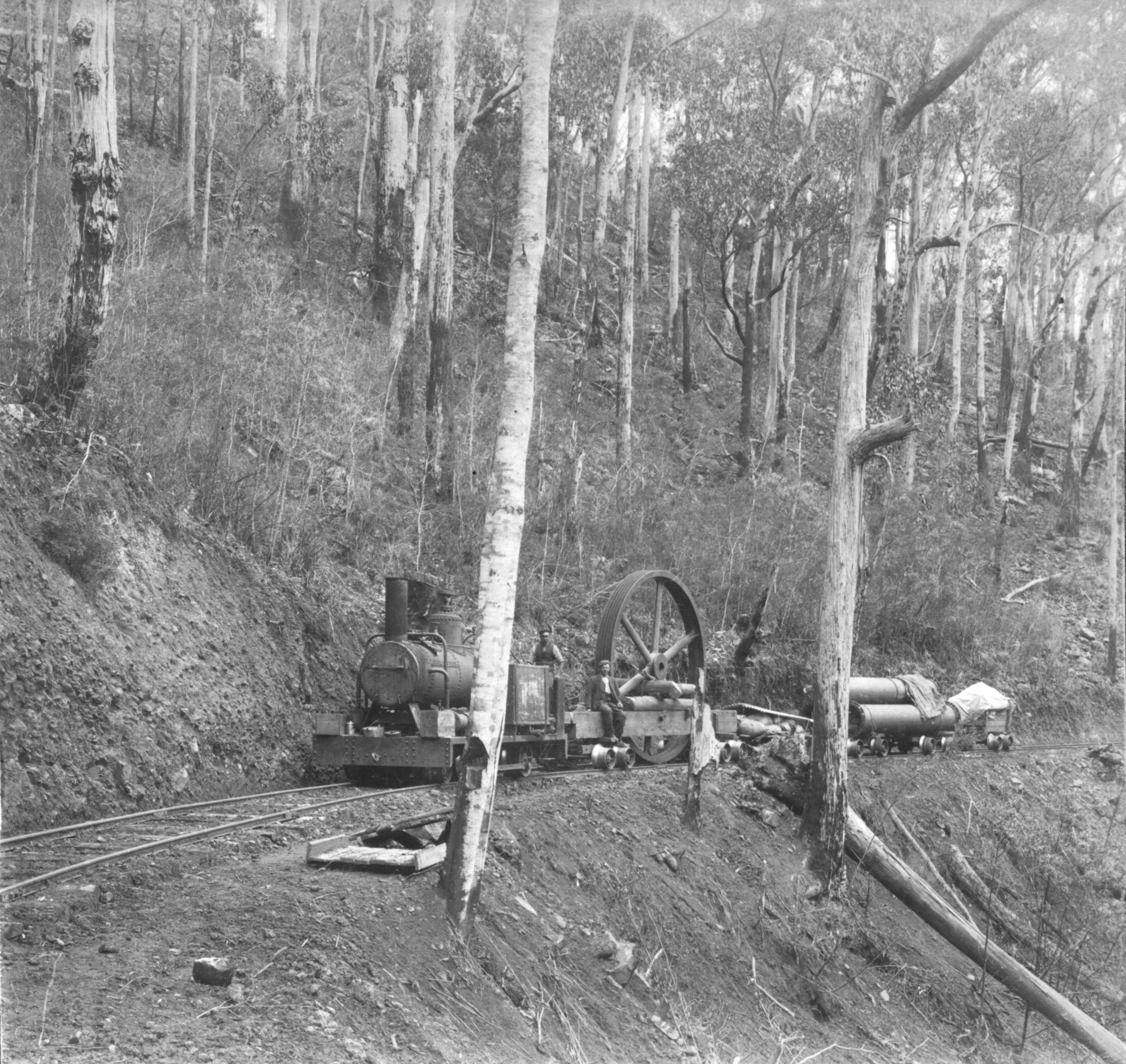
Transport of fly wheel, 1911

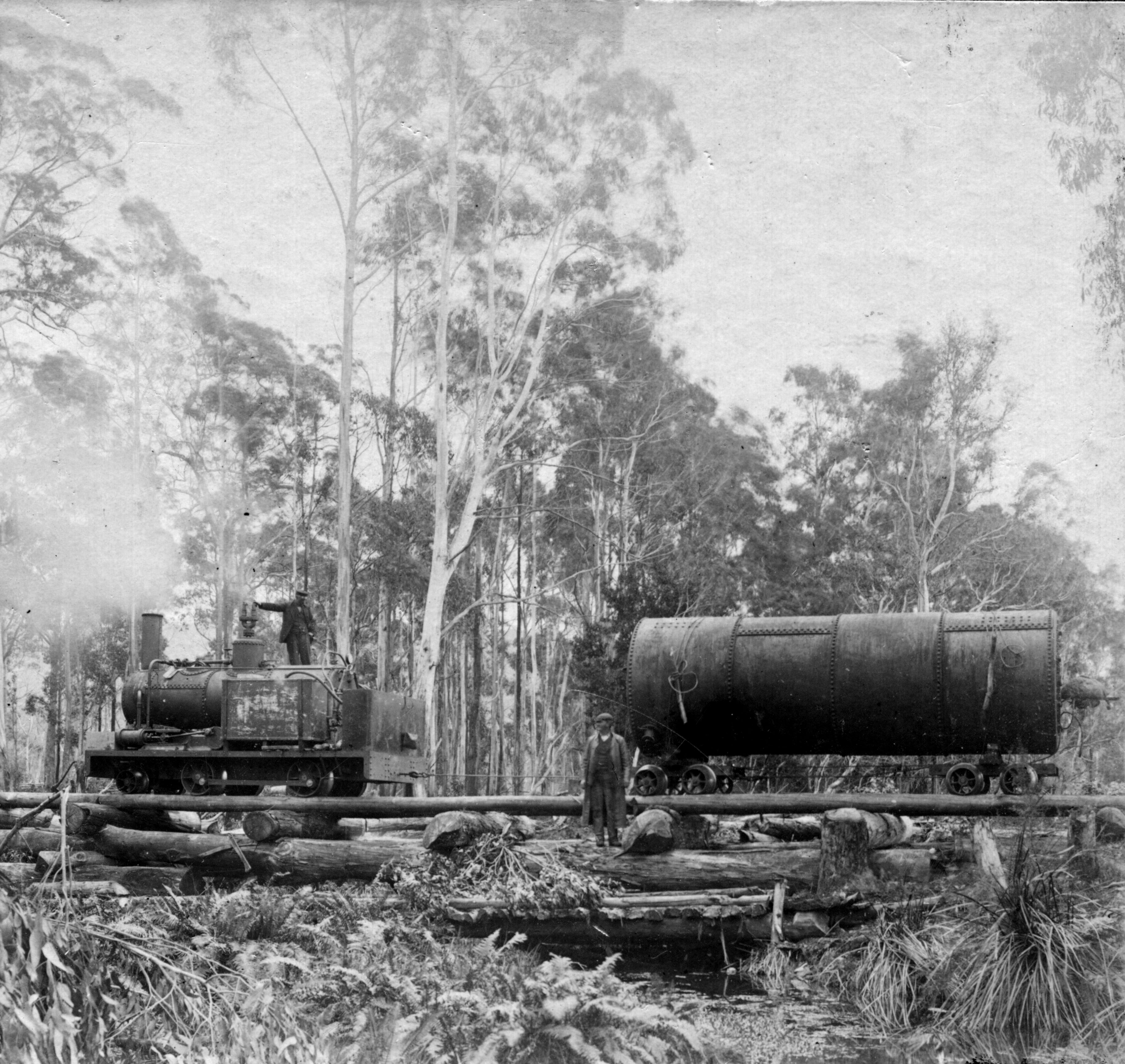
Transport of mill boiler

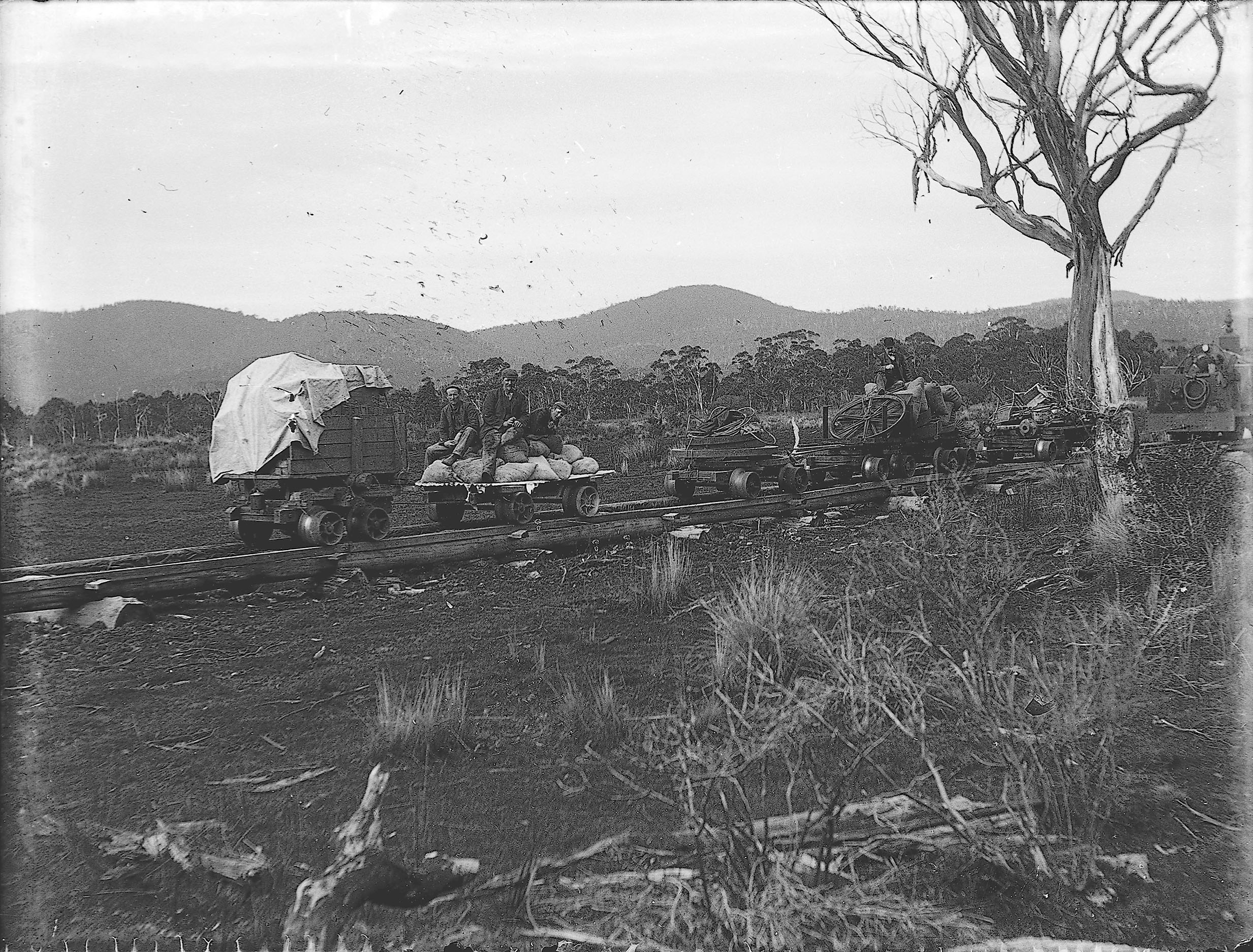
Transport of mill equipment

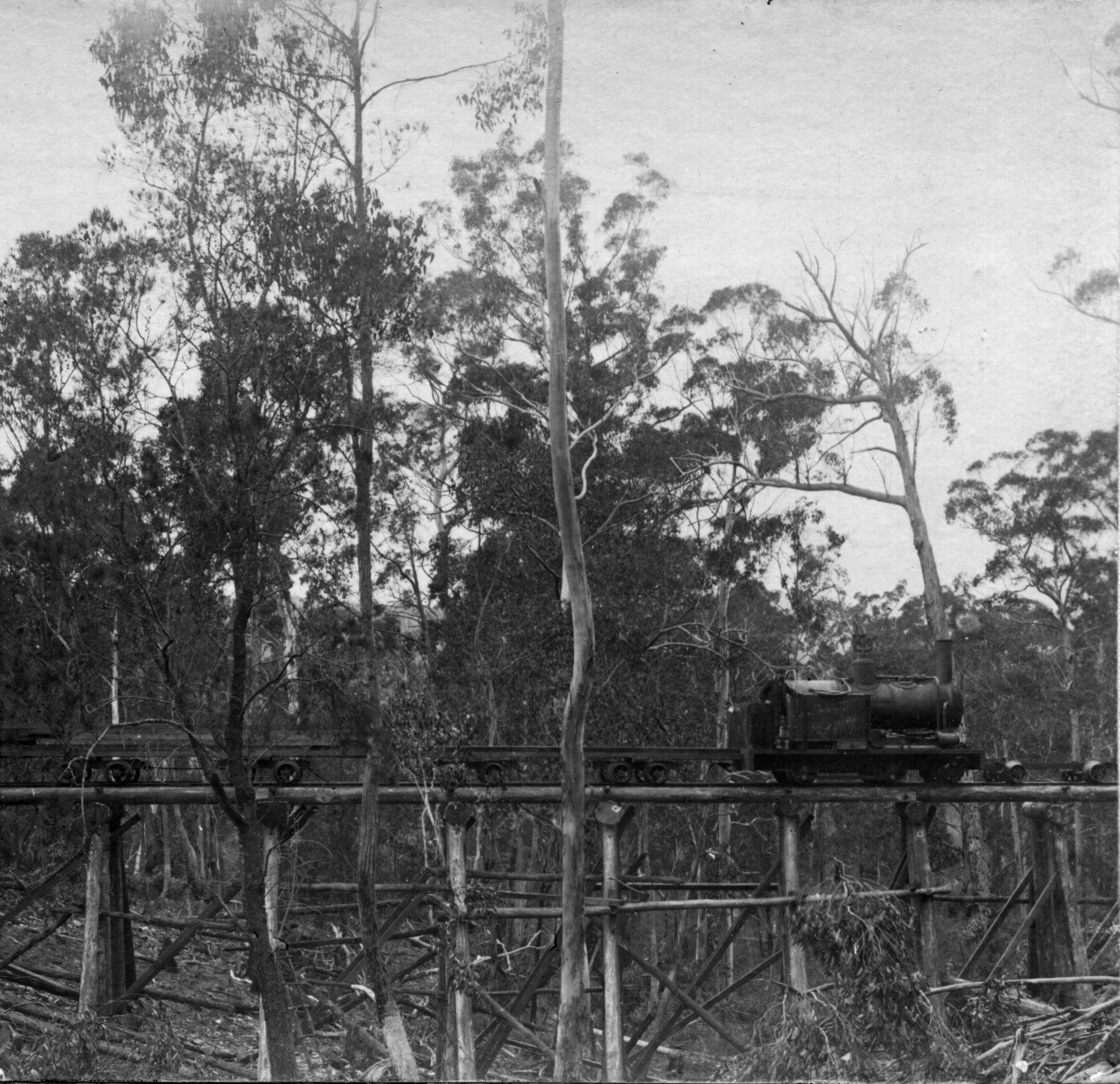
Bridge

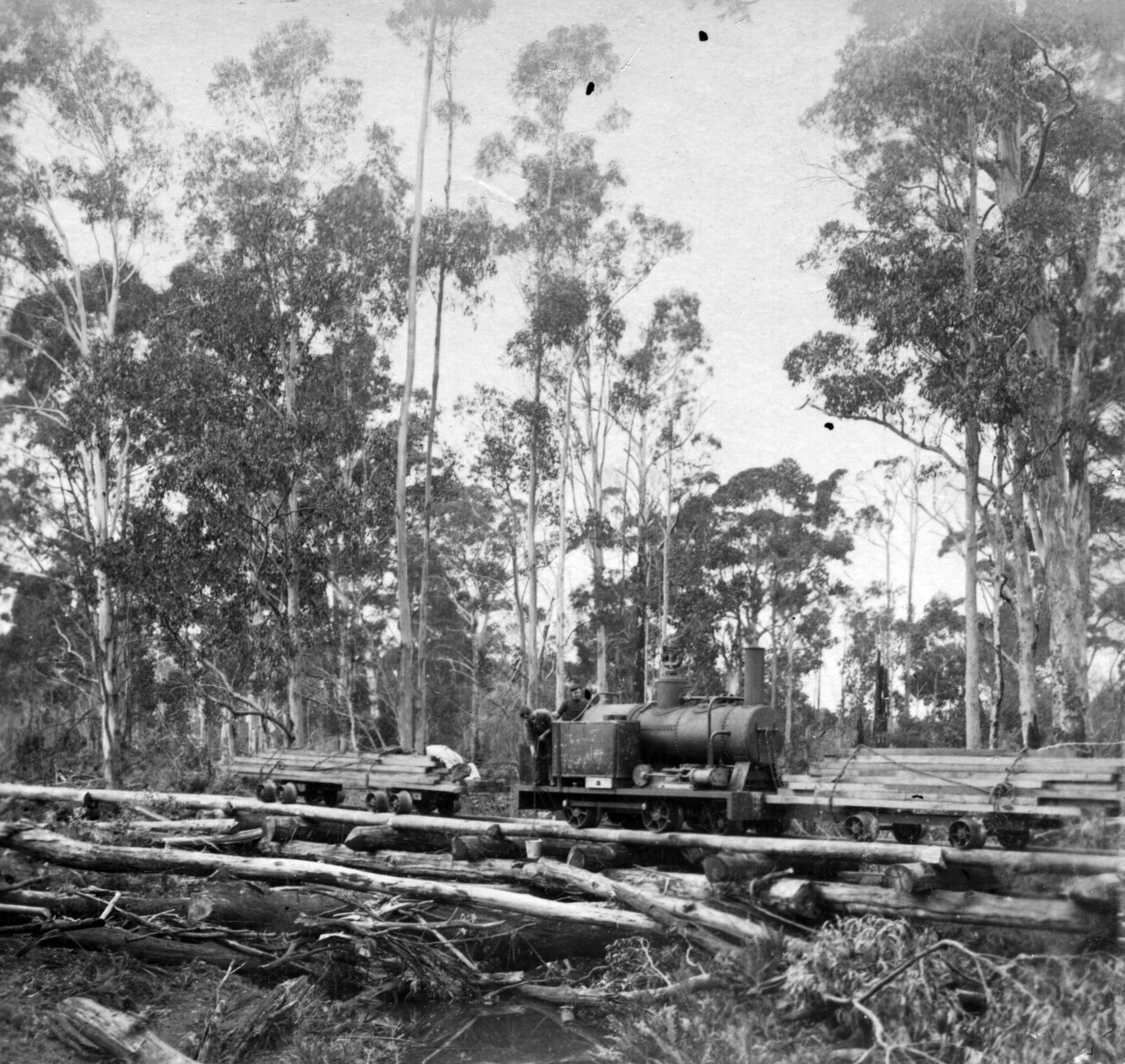
Logging

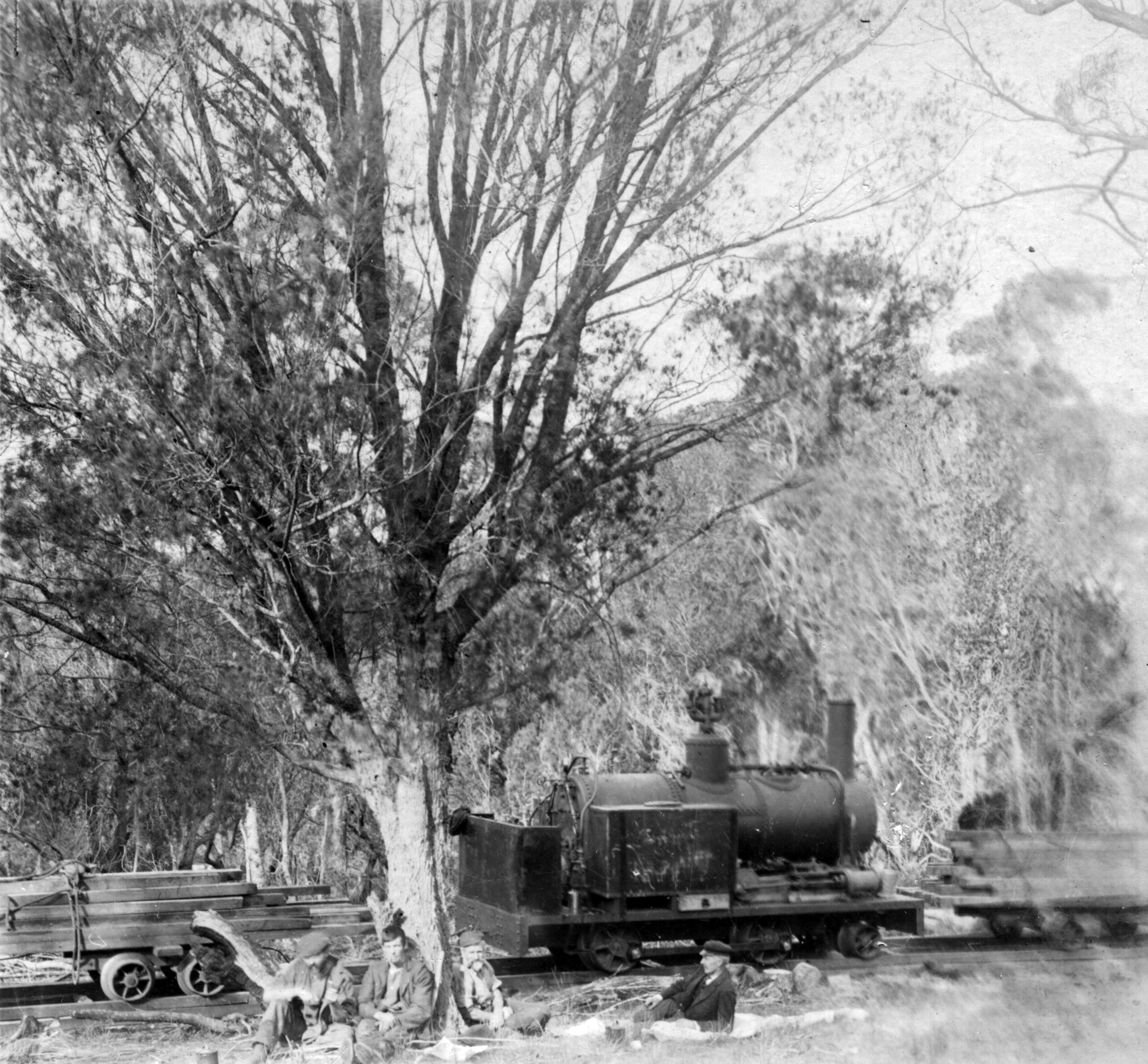
Break time
