= Coffs Harbour High School =

Location
- Coffs Harbour, Mid North Coast region of New South Wales; Australia
- Coordinates: 30°18′20″S 153°08′09″E

Information
- Type: Government-funded co-educational comprehensive secondary day school
- Motto: Latin: Lumen ex tenebris (Light out of darkness)
- Established: 1938; 88 years ago
- School district: Coffs Harbour; Regional North
- Educational authority: NSW Department of Education
- Principal: Peter South
- Teaching staff: 71 FTE (2018)
- Years: 7–12
- Enrolment: 1,004 (2018)
- Campus type: Regional
- Colours: Navy, white, and yellow
- Website: coffsharb-h.schools.nsw.gov.au

Coffs Harbour High School is a government-funded co-educational comprehensive secondary day school, located in Coffs Harbour, in the Mid North Coast region of New South Wales, Australia. The aboriginal country the school is built on is Gumbaynggirr Country.

Established in 1938, the school enrolled approximately 1,000 students in 2018, from Year 7 to Year 12, including nine percent of students who identified as Indigenous Australians and fifteen percent who were from a language background other than English. The school is operated by the NSW Department of Education; the principal is Peter South.

== Notable alumni ==
- Bob Brown – a former Australian politician, medical doctor, and environmentalist
- Mark McGowan – 30th Premier of Western Australia

== See also ==
- List of government schools in New South Wales: A–F
- List of schools in the Northern Rivers and Mid North Coast
- Education in Australia
- Coffs Harbour Senior College
