= Russell Allport =

Australian electrical engineer

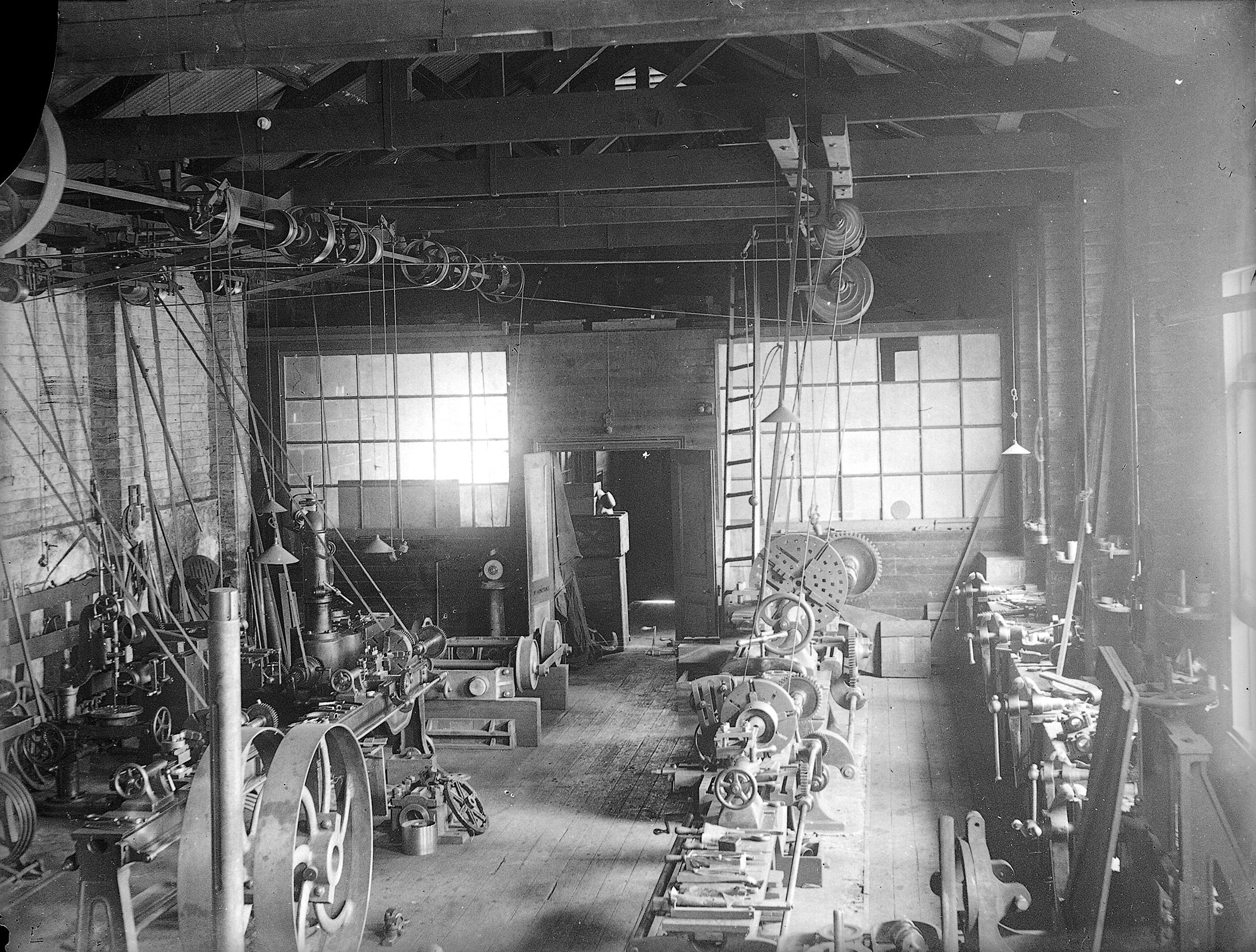
Russell Allport & Co machine shop, Hobart with the frame for a small electric loco in the far left corner

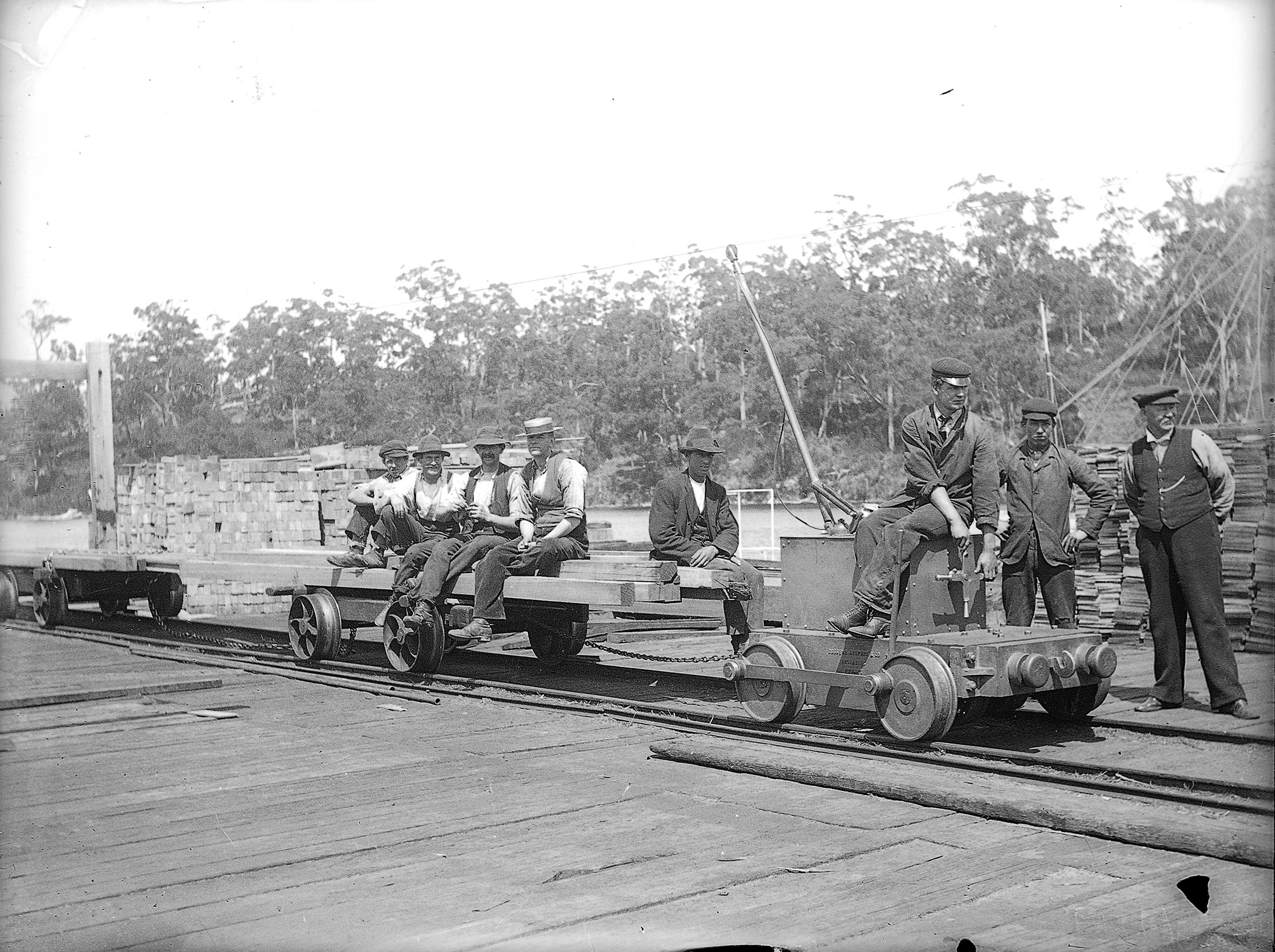
Small electric locomotive built by Russell Allport & Co, Hobart probably for Hopetoun

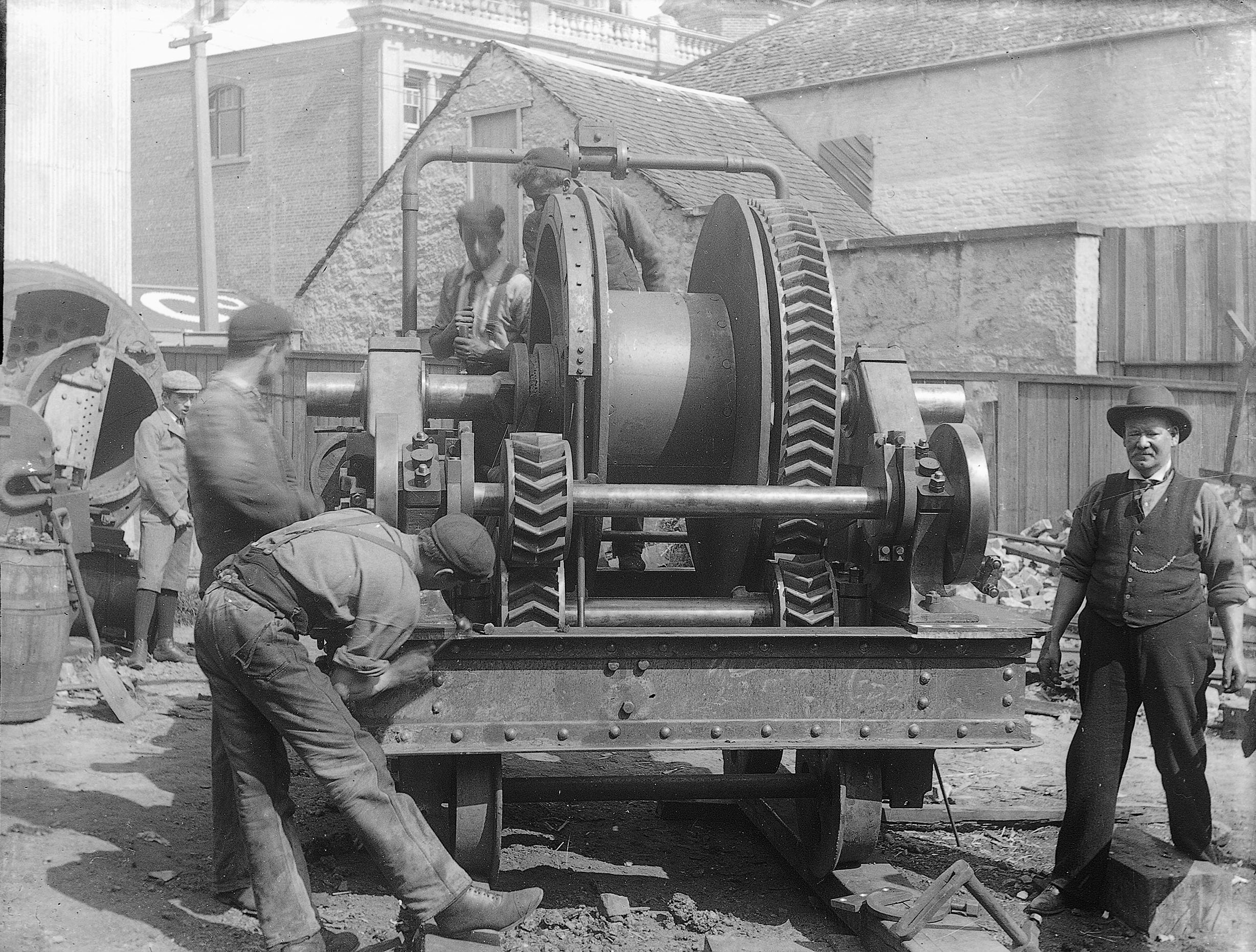
A log hauler at Russell Allport & Co, Hobart

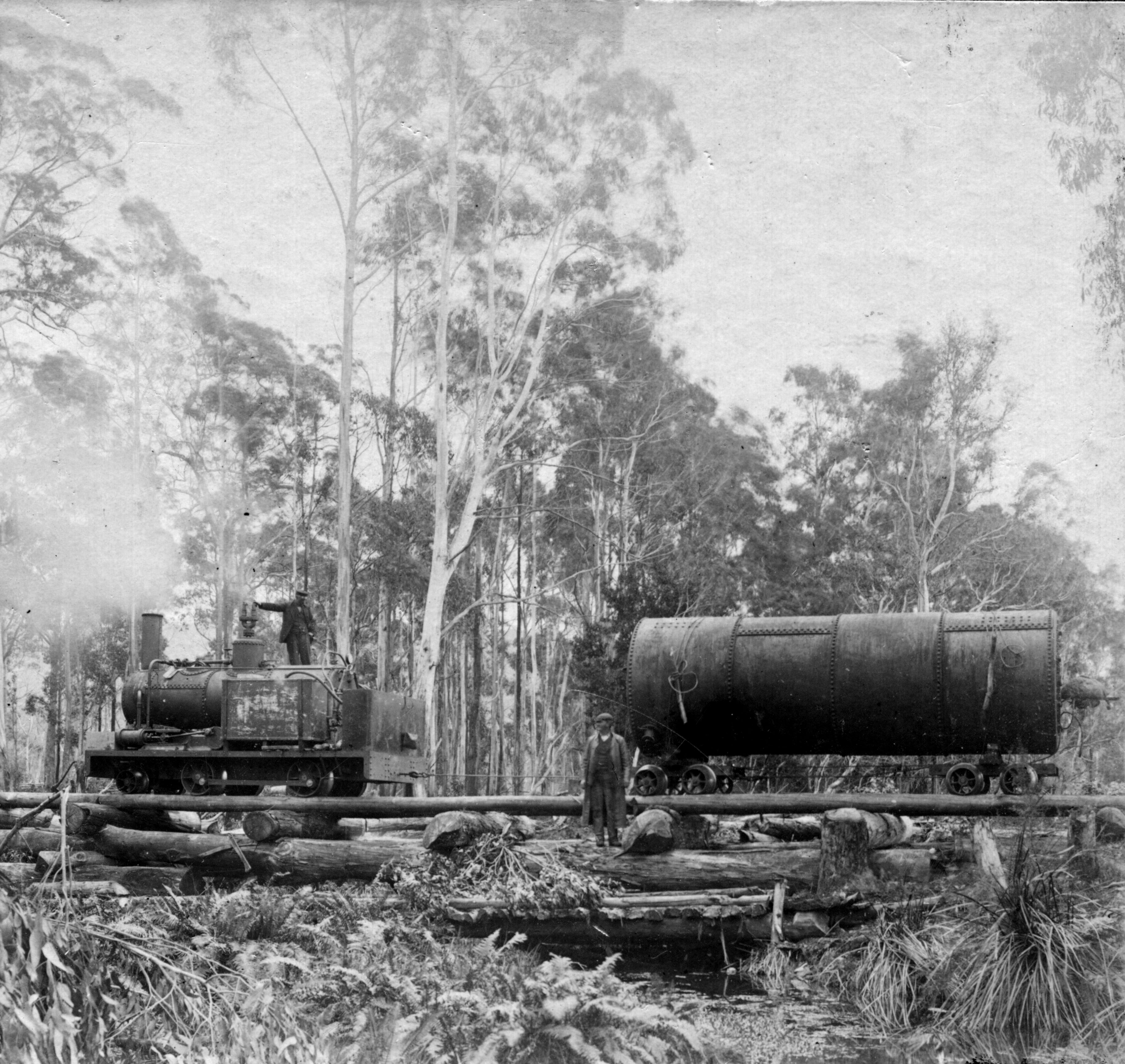
A Russell Allport locomotive on the Wielangta tram, 1911

(James) Russell Allport (died 5 February 1914 in Suva, Fiji) was an Australian electrical engineer in Hobart, Tasmania.

== Life and work ==
Russell Allport was born in as a son of Morton Allport and his wife Elizabeth, née Ritchie. After completing his education in this city he proceeded to Mount Cameron, at the north-eastern end of the Tasmanian island at the age of 17, and then obtained his first experience in engineering at the Longreach Dredging and Tin-Mining Co. He continued there some time, and then went to England, and entered the company of Spagnoletti & Crookes as an apprentice, where he gained a thorough knowledge of the profession of engineer.

He first went to work on the City and South London Railway which was being built underground. He was next sent by the same company to Notting Hill Electric Light Station. This low voltage electric power supply station worked on the three wire system with accumulators, supplying an area of two square miles. Russell Allport soon grasped the fundamental principles of the business, and gained valuable experience. But it was at Ferranti's work at Deptford that he gained his knowledge of high voltage electrical engineering. Two machines of 10,100 horse-power each were constructed at these works, capable of supplying light to 200,000 glow lamps of 16 c.p. each. These machines overall measured 85 feet (26 m) in height; the magnets had a weight of 460 tons, and the armatures 325 tons. The main shaft weighed 37 tons, and was turned from the largest ingot of steel ever cast in Scotland. The machines that could be opened out in five minutes, to make repairs to the armature of the dynamo.

Before returning to Tasmania, Russell Allport visited Germany, France, Italy and other places for the purpose of gaining experience in his profession, bringing back with him a knowledge that was to prove of great benefit to himself, and help in keeping Hobart at pace with the onward march of time. A few weeks after his return he entered the service of the Hobart Electric Tramway Company as assistant engineer under A. C. Parker.

In 1895, he set up an establishment in Murray Street, but it was not long before he found that the premises were not nearly large enough for the rapid growth of his business. His first order of any note was to instill the electric light on the S.S. Silver Crown, belonging to Messrs. O'May Bros.

He purchased subsequently 75 by 170 feet (23 m × 52 m) land in Melville Street, on which he erected a brick factory on the most modern lines. Within four years he employed 15 persons. He expanded his premises further comprising front offices and stores, a commodious machinery workshop and engine room, a carpenter's shop, brass and iron foundry, and smithy. The implements used were four lathes, planing, drilling, shaping, and screwing machines. Russell Allport added also the necessary appliances for taking Röntgen X ray photographs, so that a most useful institution, even in this particular alone, has been founded. He has built at this establishment a steam engine of 30 horse power to order. He has been credited for having built the finest manufacturing plant in the southern part of Tasmania.

Several steamers have been installed with the electric light machinery and fittings, including the Banks Peninsula, Grafton, and Australia. Russell Allport was an agent for the Brush Electrical Engineering Co., introducing much of their machinery into Tasmania. Russell Allport has been engaged in executing machinery for one of the largest companies in the colony.

Casting and planing were carried out on the premises under Russell Allport's supervision. His firm produced electric light fittings for a number of Hobart establishments, including the brackets used to hold arc and incandescent lamps over footpaths. The works included a foundry and a carpenter's shop.

His premises were lit throughout with the electric light. The workmen employed were well up in their particular line, and with Allport's supervision nothing but the best work was turned out. The trade has extended in many directions, and was not likely to decline in the hands of such a capable manager. He invested wisely, and was subsequently reaping the benefit. Allport's connection with Hobart, brief though it has been so far, has been of immense advantage to the development of the city, as well as to himself.

Russell Allort died in the Colonial Hospital, Suva, Fiji, on 7 January 1914 after making the trip to the Fiji's islands in the steamer Tofua, during which he became so ill that he had to be sent to the hospital on the steamer's arrival in Suva.

== Projects (selection) ==
- Electric locomotive
- Electric light of Gaiety Theatre, Zeehan
- 17-light electrical installation for the steamer Banks Peninsula of Messrs T. A. Reynolds and Co (November 1895).
