= James Norman (author) =

Australian journalist

James Norman has written for The Guardian, The Age, The Saturday Paper, among others. He is the author of the book Bob Brown: Gentle Revolutionary, a biography of Bob Brown, the Greens' leader. He has also worked for several Australian environmental NGOs including Greenpeace, the International Campaign to Abolish Nuclear Weapons and the Australian Conservation Foundation. Norman is based in Melbourne, Australia.
