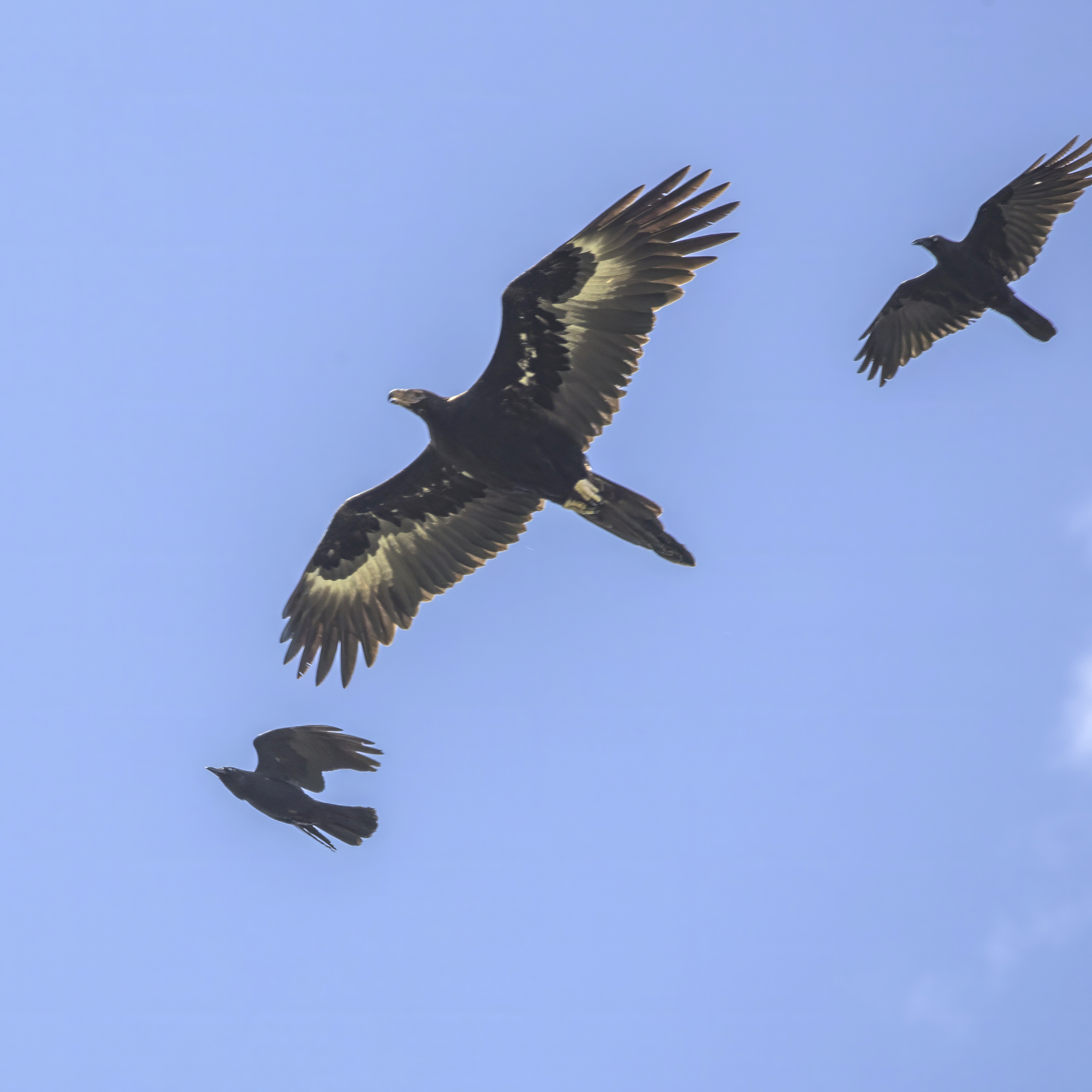
- A. a. fleayi mobbed by forest ravens

Conservation status
- Endangered (EPBC Act)

Scientific classification
- Kingdom: Animalia
- Phylum: Chordata
- Class: Aves
- Order: Accipitriformes
- Family: Accipitridae
- Genus: Aquila
- Species: A. audax
- Subspecies: A. a. fleayi

Trinomial name
- Aquila audax fleayi Condon & Amadon, 1954

= Tasmanian wedge-tailed eagle =

Subspecies of bird

The Tasmanian wedge-tailed eagle (Aquila audax fleayi) is an endangered bird of Tasmania. It is a subspecies of the more common wedge-tailed eagle.

== Description ==
Aquila is a genus of large eagles that have long, rounded wings with deeply emarginated tips. They also have very strong legs and claws and ear-shaped nostrils. The subspecies A. a. fleayi is the largest of the wedge-tailed eagles.

A. a. fleayi has a total body length between 100 and 110 cm with wingspans of 1.9–2.3 m, and weighs 3.5–5.5 kg. Females are larger (longer with a much larger beak) and are about 15% heavier than the males. They become sexually mature at 4–6 years of age.

The largest wingspan recorded for an eagle was that of the Tasmanian wedge-tailed eagle, a female killed in 1931 had a wingspan of 284 cm (112 in), and another female was measured barely smaller at 279 cm (9 ft 2 in).

Fledged juveniles are tawny brown with a dark blond nape and dark tail and flight feathers. The plumage darkens after many months until it is almost black. The bases of adults' primary feathers are pale silver, giving a 'window' appearance when viewed from below. Males are sooty brown with a reddish-golden nape.

Outside the breeding season, Tasmanian wedge-tailed eagles are usually quiet, although they produce a range of specific, rather gentle calls. They are usually found in pairs or as a family. During the breeding season, aerial displays are a common sight.

== Behaviour ==
Wedge-tailed eagles are territorial, top-order predators with very large home ranges which are evenly dispersed in suitable habitats.

=== Breeding ===
Wedge-tailed eagles generally pair for life and remain together throughout the year. When courting and pair-bonding, they perform spectacular aerial displays. Courtship usually starts in late June, from this time onwards there is a gradual increase in aerial displays and nest repairing behaviour which peaks in late August. During August, the month prior to egg laying, the nest is liberally adorned and lined with greenery. This behaviour continues throughout breeding and may even be exhibited by single adults in territories.

One or two eggs (usually one) is laid in late August or early September. Eggs appear whitish-grey with a few brown spots and are approximately 73 by 58 millimetres (2.9 in × 2.3 in) in size. The female will incubate the eggs for 43–45 days and during this time is fed by the male.

For the first few weeks after hatching the chick is fed by the female. By six to eight weeks of age the chick is capable of feeding itself and both parents bring food direct to the nest. Chicks take up to 90 days to fledge, after which will remain near the nest for several weeks. Juveniles are dependent on their parents for food for at least three months and may accompany parent birds until the next breeding season. Juvenile birds disperse widely after abandoning their parents.

=== Diet ===
Wedge-tailed eagles are carnivorous birds of prey that hunt over a wide range of habitats, including open heath, pasture and grassland, but may also scavenge on carrion when available. They feed mainly on invasive rabbits and hares, native birds such as the nativehen and Cape barren goose, and medium size mammals such as the Bennett's wallaby, common brushtail possum, common wombat, Tasmanian pademelon, and sometimes the spiky short-beaked echidna. Immature birds that lack hunting experience are particularly dependent on carrion as a source of food, although adults will also feed heavily on carrion during winter. In rural Tasmania, the diet of A. a. fleayi has been recorded to consist of European rabbits, European hares and feral cats (which comprise approximately 45% of items consumed); wallabies, possums, echidnas and wombats (approximately 30%); birds (approximately 10%); young sheep and goats (approximately 7.5%); and reptiles such as the blotched blue-tongued lizard and the highly venomous tiger snake (approximately 5%) (the remaining 2.5% of the diet is composed of other items) such as carrion.

==== Hunting technique ====
The wedge-tailed eagle captures most of its live prey by sallying. This typically involves a bird launching itself from a perch and then attacking prey on the ground or, less frequently, in flight. Hunting usually takes place during the day, and prey is usually eaten where it is captured, except during the breeding season when much of the food is taken back to the nest and is fed to the young. Eagles typically do not bring carrion back for the nestlings to consume.

Although it is capable of killing prey much larger than their own body weight, most prey items taken are much smaller (approximately 50% or less of the eagle's mass). Wedge-tailed eagles cannot carry more than about one third of their own body weight.

== Distribution and habitat ==
=== Distribution ===
A. a. fleayi is distributed throughout Tasmania with only very few sightings on King Island and the smaller islands of Bass Strait. The species forages in all habitats from coastal dunes to mountain peaks. There is no known movement between Tasmania and mainland Australia of wedge-tailed eagles, however a single bird was sighted over Curtis Island circa 1985.

Although the species is capable of foraging in forest, the density of the sub-canopy and ground vegetation will influence the availability of prey. Eagle density is therefore understood to be lower in the western and southwestern areas of Tasmania (less than half that in the east), where forests tend to be lower and scrubbier. Densities of the species are highest in areas providing mosaics of forest, farmland, grassland, wetlands and rivers. Estimated densities range from a minimum of one pair per 1,200 square kilometres (460 sq mi) in western and south-western Tasmania to one pair per 20–30 square kilometres (7.7–11.6 sq mi) in eastern and northern regions.

=== Nesting habitat ===
Wedge-tailed eagle nesting habitat is generally restricted to predominantly closed canopy old-growth native forest, almost exclusively in tracts of tall eucalypt forest greater than 10 hectares (25 acres) in area. However, nesting habitat can range from rainforest to isolated eucalypts in Acacia forest. Trees selected for nesting are among the largest in the locality, typically greater than 27 metres (89 ft) in height, with few exceptions. Nest trees normally occur on leeward slopes sheltered from prevailing strong winds. The top of the tree is usually lower than ground level of the top of the adjacent ridge.

The territory of a wedge-tailed eagle pair can contain up to three or five nests with one being favoured each year. Eagles will return to previous nesting sites, with some nests having been used continuously for at least 50 years. Nests are usually spaced about 200 metres (660 ft) apart, but they can be separated by more than 1 kilometre (0.62 mi) in areas where habitat is patchy or restricted.

== Conservation ==
Reasons for the decline of the Tasmanian wedge-tailed eagle are lower breeding success from disturbances of nests, loss of habitat, a small breeding population, a decrease in the number of mature individuals, and an unnaturally high mortality rate due to persecution and other factors.

The wedge-tailed eagle is wholly protected and killing one is illegal. About 20% of the eagles occur on designated reserves. An increase in breeding success on private property was pursued through the establishment of individual agreements and management plans. Throughout Tasmania, 60 landowners were contracted and 20 made agreements.

The vast majority of known nests (over 80%) occur on State Forest and private property. This is partly due to the majority of suitable eagle habitat occurring on State Forest and private land but also due to the majority of nest site searches conducted as a result of forestry activities.

A. a. fleayi will not nest in areas that have high human densities, the eagles are very timid while breeding and are likely to desert a nest if disturbed.

=== Population trends ===
Tasmania's wedge-tailed eagles have less genetic variation than their mainland relatives and have been isolated from the mainland for 8,000-10,000 years, since the last trans-Bassian land bridge. No historical measures of population size in Tasmania are known, but records suggest that the eagle is widespread but uncommon. It may have benefited from rabbit plagues, but poisoning has killed numbers of eagles, along with persecution.

Breeding success has decreased to the point where, on average, 95 pairs are successful each year. About 69% of territories had active nests or all nests were known to have produced at least one egg and 53% were successful in raising a fledging. Annual mortality rates are about 50% for juveniles, 30% for other immature birds, and 5% for adults. Tasmania has only 220 nesting territories. However, not all territories are occupied by two adults and replacement times for adults ‘lost’ from territories seems excessive, suggesting a dearth of non-territorial floaters and an adult population less than 440.

== Gallery ==
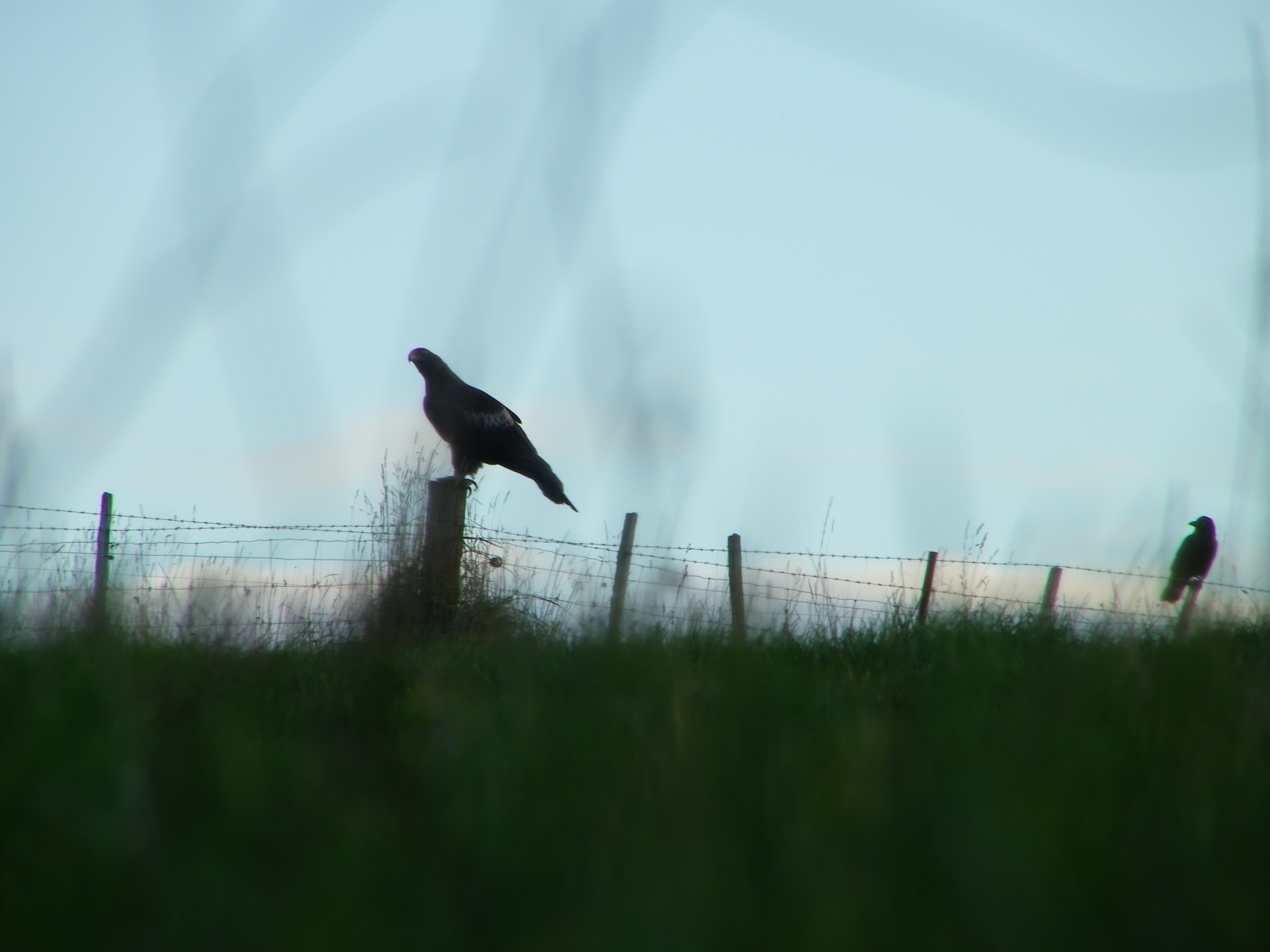
Silhouette of a wedge-tailed eagle and a forest raven (crow).

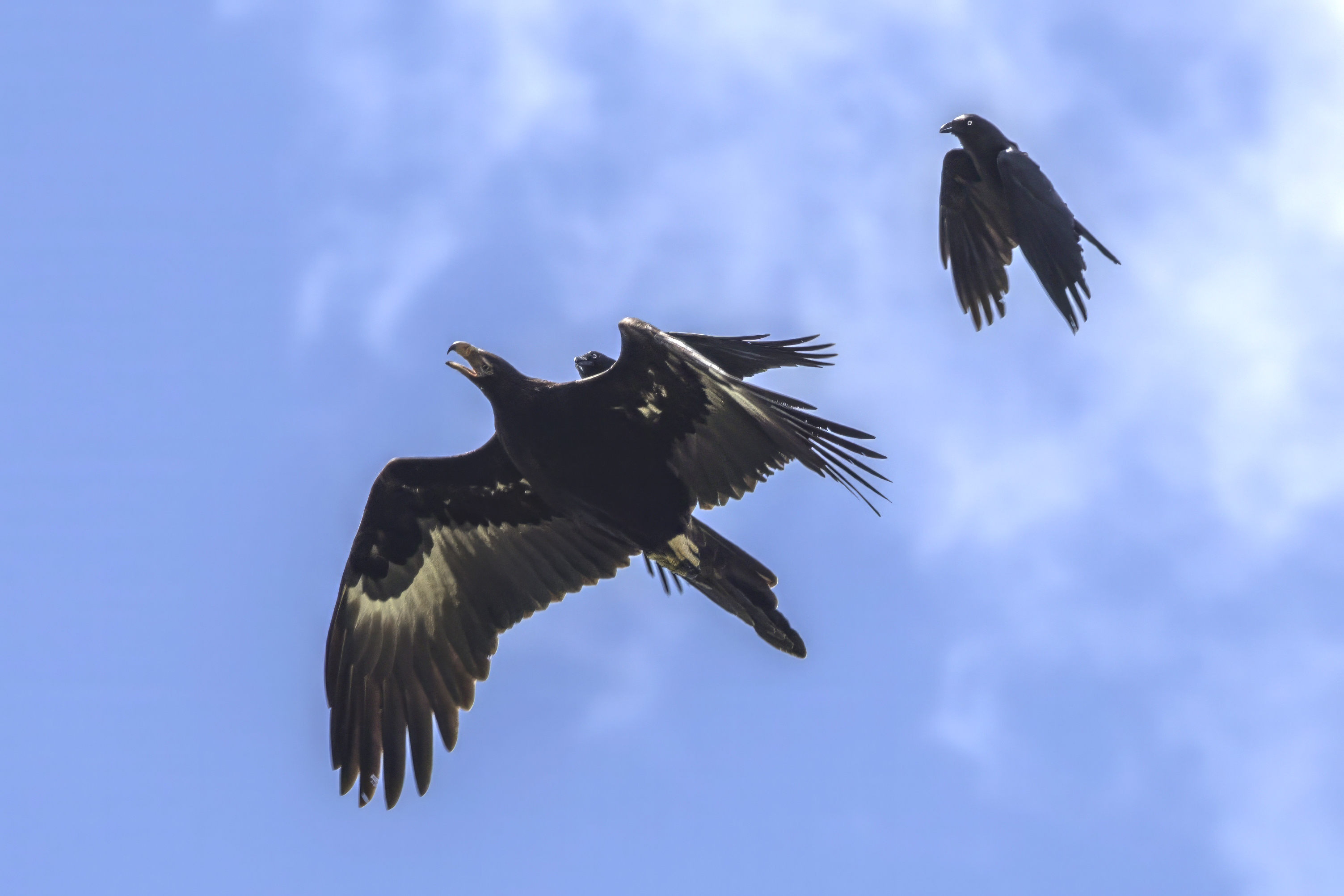
Wedge-tailed eagle being mobbed by forest ravens.

== See also ==
- White-bellied sea eagle - the Tasmanian population of this bird of prey is considered vulnerable.

== Notes ==
With effort made to state otherwise, within this article:

- The term 'wedge-tailed eagle', etc. refers to the Tasmanian wedge-tailed eagle (Aquila audax fleayi).
- Attributes and characteristics of Aquila audax fleayi may also be common to the superspecies, Aquila audax.
