= Lissotes latidens =

Scientific classification
- Kingdom: Animalia
- Phylum: Arthropoda
- Class: Insecta
- Order: Coleoptera
- Suborder: Polyphaga
- Infraorder: Scarabaeiformia
- Family: Lucanidae
- Genus: Lissotes
- Species: L. latidens

Binomial name
- Lissotes latidens Westwood, 1871

Species of beetle

Lissotes latidens, commonly known as the Wielangta stag beetle or broad-toothed stag beetle, is a species of stag beetle which is only found in an area centred in Wielangta Forest in eastern Tasmania. It is one of the rarest animals in Australia.

The broad-toothed stag beetle has been recorded at less than 40 sites, scattered across an area of 280 square kilometres (110 sq mi), since it was first discovered in 1871. It lives and breeds in moist decaying wood underneath logs on the ground. It has no wings, and it is likely that it moves no further than tens of metres throughout its life. Stag beetles are an ancient lineage thought to have evolved with the dinosaurs over 200 million years ago. In a 2006 study some 121 logs were rolled, only 2 broad-toothed stag beetles were observed, out of a total of some 106 beetles. It is threatened by bulldozing and burning, because this disturbs leaf litter and logs, removes old trees and dries out the forest by removal of the canopy. It was listed as a threatened species on 3 December 2002.
